= Communism in Nepal =

Communism in Nepal traces its roots back to the pro-democracy movement of 1951, and the subsequent overthrow of the autocratic Rana regime and the establishment of democracy in Nepal. The communist movement in Nepal has split into factions multiple times and multiple factions have come together into a single fold at times as well. It has a history of getting banned from open political discourse, as well as multiple instances of embracing guerrilla insurgency, most notably, the Maoist insurgency in the 1990s and early 2000s that led to the Nepalese Civil War, claiming at least 17,000 lives.

In 2006, the Maoists and other main political parties (communist and otherwise) formed a united coalition, launching a successful peaceful civil resistance against the dictatorial coup d'état by the monarchy. This resistance movement resulted in the abolition of the monarchy in 2008 and the drafting of a new constitution. The constitution affirmed Nepal as a secular, federal, democratic republic, which strived towards democratic socialism. The two main communist parties of Nepal contested the first election according to the new constitution as a coalition, eventually leading to their unification in 2018. The unified party had a strong majority in the federal parliament, as well as six out of seven provinces of Nepal, until splitting again into the original two parties in 2021.

== History ==
Communism arrived relatively late in Nepal because of the country's isolation from the rest of the world during the Rana regime. By 1930, communist writings had begun to be smuggled into Nepal and two of the four great martyrs, Dasharath Chand and Gangalal Shrestha were known to have been readers of communist literature. The country was still largely illiterate. Much of what would become the first communist party of Nepal was born during the Indian independence movement.

=== Communist Party of Nepal ===
Nepali communist parties use the traditional banner with hammer and sickle which represent workers and peasants respectively.

The communist movement in Nepal traces its history back to Pushpa Lal Shrestha, often referred to as the father of Nepali communism and the founder and general secretary of the first Nepali communist party, the Communist Party of Nepal. Younger brother to Gangalal Shrestha, Pushpa Lal joined the political fight against the autocratic Rana regime at a young age. He began his political career as a member of Nepal Praja Parishad, which was dissolved in 1941, following the execution of the great martyrs. While continuing to be a part of the Indian independence movement, many Nepali students, leaders and activists in India, began to organise under the common goal of birthing a conscious political movement against the Rana regime, and bringing democracy to Nepal, with the help of the Indian friends, after independence was achieved in India. Pushpa Lal went on to become a prominent member of the Nepal Rastriya Congress (NRC), one of the prominent forebears of Nepali Congress Party. Disillusioned by the political infighting within the party, and the party's willingness to cooperate with some Ranas, Pushpa Lal left the party he was the office secretary of, and sought to birth an "uncompromising political struggle" against the Rana regime. After his meeting with the noted Indian communist leader Nripendra Chakrawarti, he settled upon founding a communist party, deeming the support of the international socialist movement an indispensable asset in the struggle against feudalism. On 22 April 1949, he founded the Communist Party of Nepal along with four other colleagues, in Calcutta. He translated The Communist Manifesto and other writings of Lenin and Mao, in addition to his own original writings on Nepali struggle for democracy and Nepal's future path.

Following the end of the Rana regime in 1951, Nepal saw a brief period of exercise in democracy, with Nepali Congress, the king and the Ranas as the main players. Pushpa Lal Shrestha and his party returned to Nepal. Following the Raksadal Revolt of 1952, the party was banned on 24 January 1952; in 1954, the party held its first general conference where Man Mohan Adhikari was elected secretary-general. In the municipal elections held in September 1953, NCP candidates won six seats, even though the party was officially banned. The ban lasted four years and was lifted in 1956. In 1957, the leader of the pro-monarchy faction, Keshar Jung Rayamajhi, replaced Adhikari as the secretary-general. The party had a poor showing in the general election of 1959, under the Rayamajhi leadership, winning just four seats out of 109 and 7.4% of the total votes cast. On 15 December 1960, king Mahendra, in a bloodless coup, deposed the democratically elected Nepali Congress government, imprisoned many political leaders including the deposed prime minister B. P. Koirala, and established the "partyless" Panchayat system. Keshar Jung Rayamajhi faction joined the Panchayat system and was expelled from the party by the third party congress held in Benaras in exile, in 1962; Tulsi Lal Amatya became the secretary-general. The communist movement further splintered into many factions in the coming decades of political struggle against the Panchayat system, while in exile and underground.

=== Nepal Communist Party (Marxist–Leninist) ===
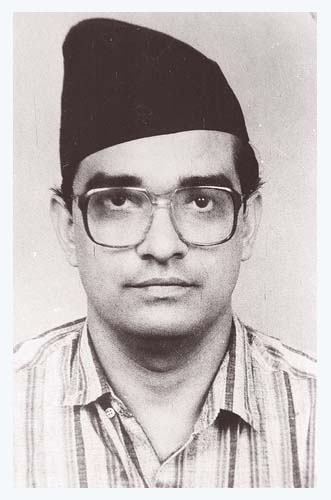
Madan Bhandari was one of the most influential thinkers of Nepali communist movement.

One of the most significant factions to emerge was the guerrilla movement known as Jhapa movement, led by young activists Mohan Chandra Adhikari, Chandra Prakash Mainali and Radha Krishna Mainali, and influenced by Charu Majumdar, the architect of Naxalite guerrilla movement in neighbouring north-east India. The guerrilla insurgency was brought to an abrupt halt in 1971, when Nepali Army launched an effective counter-insurgency, killing many cadres. The comprehensive failure of Jhapa movement led to self-reflection among the increasingly intellectual ranks of the Nepali communist movement. In the subsequent decades, there emerged an increased skepticism of dogmatic import of foreign ideas and strategies, and an appreciation for the development of an original path to socialism in Nepal, particularly designed to be suited to the Nepali reality. A faction led by Madhav Kumar Nepal as well as another faction led by Madan Bhandari had merged with All Nepal Communist Revolutionary Coordination Committee (Marxist–Leninist) by 1977, which launched Communist Party of Nepal (Marxist–Leninist), popularly known as Male, in 1978. Male focused on grass-roots movement and mass-education of the workers and peasant class. One member who would later emerge as one of the most powerful communist leaders in Nepal, KP Sharma Oli, is credited by some, for playing a part in shifting the party ideology from violent insurgency to peaceful political struggle.

In the 1980 referendum, Male, already a party with national reach and a significant grassroots support, actively campaigned for the option of multi-party democracy. With this open campaign for democracy, Male bolstered its support among pro-democracy electorate as well as the international community and had emerged as the premier force of the Nepali communist movement. In 1982, the party officially abandoned armed struggle as a non-viable option, opting for peaceful mass resistance instead. It also deposed Chandra Prakash Mainali, and Jhala Nath Khanal took over as general secretary. The party continued to absorb minor factions of the communist movement throughout the 1980s, and by the mid-1980s, had emerged as the premier communist force overshadowing the pro-Soviet Communist Party of Nepal - Marxist (CPN-M) led by veteran leaders Man Mohan Adhikari and Sahana Pradhan (Pushpa Lal Shrestha's widow). The party continued to move towards democratic socialism, and in 1986, elected Madan Bhandari, who would later go on to architect the People's Multiparty Democracy principle, as general secretary. In 1990, it formed the United Left Front with CPN-M, joined with Nepali Congress, and organised and participated in the peaceful civil resistance of 1990. Following the subsequent end of Panchayat system in favour of constitutional monarchy, the United Left Front would go on to formalise the coalition; CPN-M and CPN-ML uniting into CPN-UML in 1991.

=== Communist Party of Nepal (Unified Socialist) ===
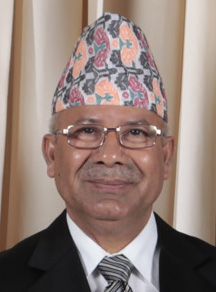
Former PM Madhav Kumar Nepal, chairman of the party has been a key figure of Nepali politics since 1990

The Communist Party of Nepal (Unified Socialist) is the third largest Communist party of Nepal. It was formed in August, 2021 under the leadership of Madhav Kumar Nepal. It split from CPN (UML) citing dictatorship, arrogance and monopoly of party president KP Sharma Oli. Nepal was supported by former prime minister Jhala Nath Khanal, senior Communist leader Pradeep Nepal, 32 parliamentarians and lakhs of party members throughout the country. The party follows the norms of Marxism–Leninism and People's Multiparty Democracy. The party has become one of the four major parties in Nepal.

=== Communist Party of Nepal (Unified Marxist–Leninist) ===
Communist Party of Nepal (Unified Marxist–Leninist) (CPN-UML), under the leadership of Man Mohan Adhikari, won 69 out of 205 seats in the 1991 elections, becoming the second largest party and the main opposition party. The 1993 general conference ratified the party ideology dubbed People's Multiparty Democracy, and elected its principal architect, Madan Bhandari as the general secretary, with Adhikari remaining party chairman. The manifesto affirmed the party's commitment to democratic socialism and opened path for its recognition in the international arena as a democratic force with a left-lean, rather than a communist party, despite its name. Madan Bhandari, along with the party's Head of Organisation Department, Jibaraj Ashrit, was killed on a jeep accident later that year; and Madhav Kumar Nepal became general secretary. In the 1994 midterm elections, CPN-UML became the largest party, winning 88 seats, mainly on the back of the popular PMD, and public sympathy at the loss of Madan-Ashrit. Man Mohan Adhikari became prime minister of the minority government which lasted only nine months. However, during the short tenure, Adhikari government introduced a number of welfare programs, most significant of which was a monthly stipend to all elderly citizens. The popular welfare program would secure CPN UML's future in Nepali politics for decades to come. In 1998, 46 lawmakers defected to form their own party, including influential figures of the leadership like C. P. Mainali, Jhala Nath Khanal, Sahana Pradhan and Bam Dev Gautam. However, the new party only garnered 6.4% of the vote in the 1999 elections, and the vote division only led to the victory of Nepali Congress. Most of the leaders were back to CPN UML by 2002 and only a small splinter group led by C. P. Mainali remained outside, forming their own party.

=== Communist Party of Nepal (Maoist) ===
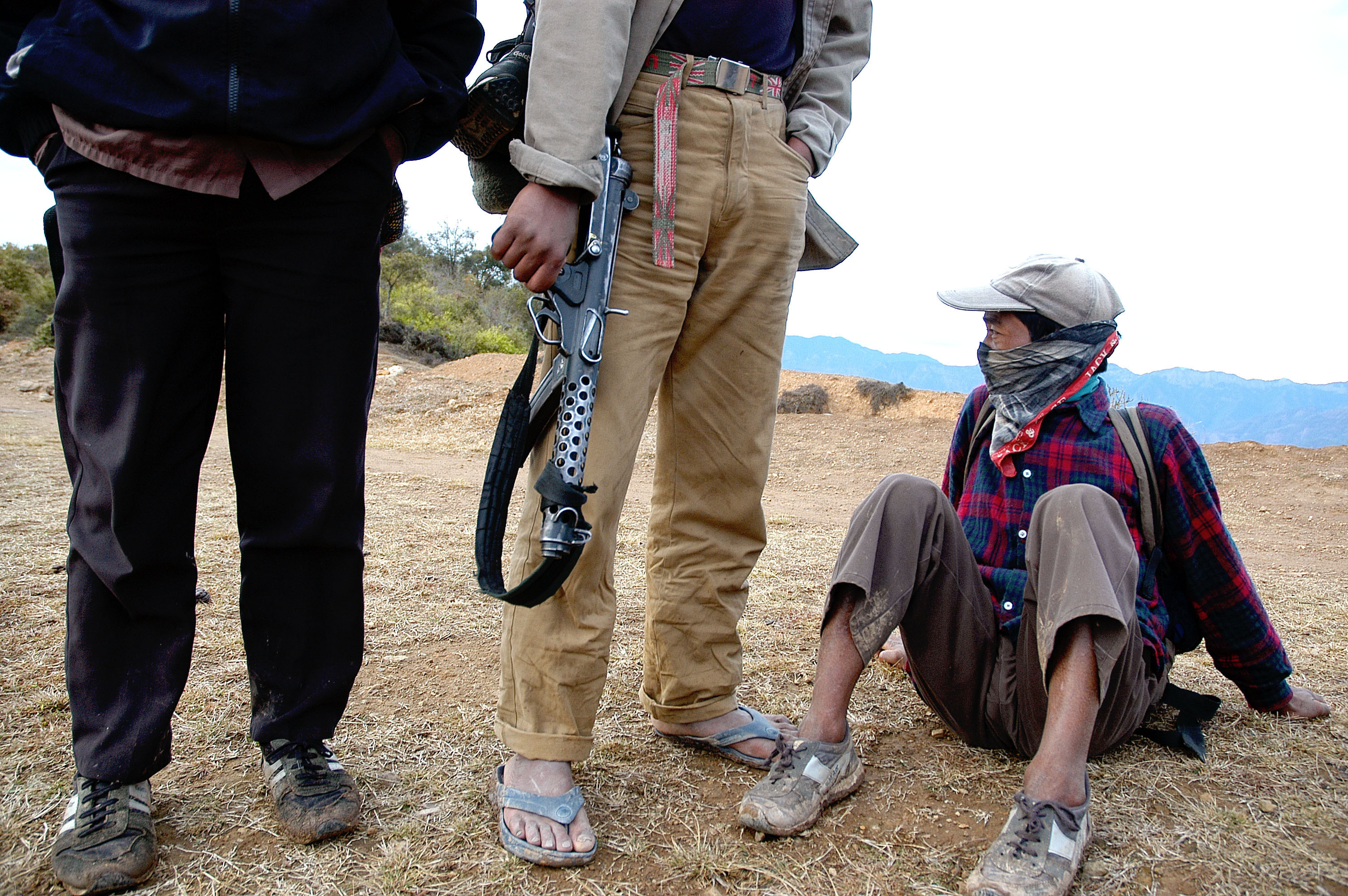
Maoist rebels in rural Nepal

Pushpa Kamal Dahal and Baburam Bhattarai had split from their respective minor communist parties and formed the Maoist Party, which launched a "people's war" by 1996. The Maoists mainly employed guerilla tactics, attacking police stations and government infrastructures. After Nepal Army was deployed and violence intensified, war crimes and crimes against humanity were committed by both sides. By 2005, the civil war had reached a stalemate, both politically and militarily. King Gyanendra had taken over direct rule of the country citing failure of the political parties to provide peace and security in the country, the Maoist party was deeply entrenched in the rural villages of Nepal and possessed the capability to bring the country to a standstill by calling a general strike whenever it desired but had no capability to dislodge the Nepali joint armed forces from district headquarters, while the major political parties, including Nepali congress and CPN (UML) were seeking a way to end violence in the country, as well as end direct rule of the king through popular protests. Altogether more than 17,000 people were killed, hundreds went missing and at least 200 000 were displaced during the Nepalese Civil War in 1996–2006.

== Ideology and policies ==
Nepali communist parties subscribe to Marxism, Leninism, Maoism, or any combination of the three. People's Multiparty Democracy principle of CPN UML and 21st century's People's Multiparty Democracy principle along with Prachandapath (Prachanda's way) of Maoists are examples of original thought or adaptation of traditional communist philosophy to modern times and Nepali landscape.

While the minor communist parties continue to hold a variety of far-left ideologies, including a support for party-less communist autocracy held by many, the mainstream communist parties have affirmed their commitment to multi-party democracy. Indeed, no communist parties that won a significant number of seats in elections did so without announcing an explicit commitment to Multiparty democracy. In the case of CPN-UML, it was formalised with the people's multi-party democracy manifesto. In the case of the Maoists, the same policy was put forward as the 21st century's People's Multiparty Democracy. The NCP continues to reaffirm its commitment to democracy having been the ruling party with a strong majority in all levels of government since the beginning of 2018; however, it is also claimed that the party's ultimate goal is Socialism and the building of a communist society.

The communists are known for their welfare programs. Government stipend to elderly and widows have been increased significantly. Stipends to the unemployed have been promised. There has been a rising concern regarding press freedom, censorship and freedom of speech. The Nepali communists are also called out for their populist nationalism and anti-India propaganda.

Other minor parties that do not believe in liberal democracy still continue to take part in the democratic process, citing that their main aim is to establish communism via a direct endorsement of the people through elections. Minor splinter groups that separated from Maoist party when it joined the peace process continue to carry out actions designed to intimidate and terrorise people, from time to time.

== See also ==
- History of Nepal
- Politics of Nepal
- List of communist parties in Nepal
