= Nara Bahadur Karmacharya =

Nepalese politician

- नरबहादुर कर्माचार्य
- Born: October 30, 1924; Lalitpur, Nepal
- Died: July 24, 2013 (aged 88); Kathmandu, Nepal
- Political party: Communist Party of Nepal

Nara Bahadur Karmacharya (Nepali: नरबहादुर कर्माचार्य; October 30, 1924 – July 24, 2013) was a Nepalese communist politician, belonging to Communist Party of Nepal (Unity Centre-Masal). Karmacharya was one of the most senior political leaders of the communist movement in Nepal, and at the time of his death was the only surviving founding member of the Communist Party of Nepal, which had been born in 1949.

== Political career ==
Karmacharya hailed from a Newar family in Lalitpur. Karmacharya had joined the Nepalese 'Marxist Study Circle' in Calcutta, India, in 1947. He was also linked to the Nepali Democratic Congress prior to the founding of the Communist Party of Nepal.

In January 1954, the first congress of CPN was held. Karmacharya was elected to the Central Committee of the party. After the conclusion of the congress, Karmacharya travelled together with Ram Bahadur Shrestha to China as a delegation of the All Nepal Trade Union. They were invited by the Chinese trade union movement to celebrate May Day there. The two stayed in China for 35 days.

Karmacharya would later join the Communist Party of Nepal (Fourth Convention). When CPN(4th Convention) was divided in 1983, he stayed in the party with Nirmal Lama.

After the victory of the 1990 Jana Andolan, Karmacharya was awarded a piece of land in compensation of his struggles against the Rana regime.

When CPN(4th Convention) merged into Communist Party of Nepal (Unity Centre) in 1990, Karmacharya became a member of the new party. In November 1991 he became the president of the advisory committee of the party.

In 1992 he became the convenor of the 'Mao Centenary Organising Committee', a committee formed to commemorate the centenary of the birth of Mao Zedong.

In 2003 he released the book Murder of Ajad: undeclared death penalty, a publication dealing with the killing of communist leader Rishi Devkota in 1981.

In the April 2008 Constituent Assembly election, Karmacharya was a candidate of Janamorcha Nepal in the proportional representation system.

In June 2008, his name was mentioned as one of the potential presidential candidates to be supported by the Communist Party of Nepal (Maoist).
