= Communist Party of Nepal (Burma) =

Communist Party of Nepal (Burma) नेपाल कम्युनिस्ट पार्टी (वर्मा)
- Founder: Keshar Jung Rayamajhi
- Founded: 1962 as CPN (Rayamajhi)
- Dissolved: 28 June 2001
- Split from: Communist Party of Nepal; CPN (United) in 1992
- Merged into: CPN (United) in 1991; CPN (Unified ML)
- Ideology: Communism; Marxism–Leninism
- Political position: Far-left

Communist Party of Nepal (Burma) (Nepali: नेपाल कम्युनिष्ट पार्टी (वर्मा)), initially known simply as Communist Party of Nepal or Communist Party of Nepal (Rayamajhi Group), was a communist party in Nepal. The party emerged from a split in the original Communist Party of Nepal in 1962, representing the pro-Soviet sector of the party. Its main leader until 1983 was Keshar Jung Rayamajhi, who had been the general secretary of the original CPN.

== History ==
In 1966 the group organised a 'Third Central Conference', with delegates from 17 districts. The conference amended the old CPN party constitution, adopting 'National Democracy' as the line of the party. The conference stated that the royal takeover in the country had been a backlash for the democratic forces, and called for a united front to be formed with Nepali Congress. Moreover, the conference made a call for the holding of a party congress.

In 1967 the group held its 'third congress' in Kathmandu (considering the two first CPN congresses as theirs). The congress elected a 21-member Central Committee and a five-member politburo. The politburo consisted of Keshar Jung Rayamajhi (general secretary), Bishnu Bahadur Manandhar, Krishna Raj Burma, Kamar Shah and Krishna Prasad Shrestha. Manmohan Adhikari and Shambhu Ram Shrestha, both in jail at the time, were nominated to the Central Committee. The congress stated that the Soviet Union was the international centre of socialism, and condemned the positions of China. The congress called for a peaceful political struggle in Nepal, and condemned the idea of armed struggle as 'adventurism'. The congress branded the rival CPN of Tulsi Lal Amatya and Pushpa Lal Shrestha as 'extremist'.

When King Birendra declared Nepal as a 'Zone of Peace', the party wholeheartedly supported this move.

=== Splits ===
The party was able to maintain its unity until 1979. However, there were intense debates inside the party on how to relate to the Panchayat system. This dispute intensified in 1976, as the King amended the constitution of the country. In the wake of the people's movement of 1979, sharp differences arose between Bishnu Bahadur Manandhar and Rayamajhi. Manandhar called for participation in the popular protests against the regime, and accused Rayamajhi of favouring status quo. Manandhar branded Rayamajhi as a 'Royalist', due to his membership in the Raj Sabha appointed by the King. In 1981 the followers of Manandhar, a major section of the party, broke away and formed their own Communist Party of Nepal. After the split, Rayamajhi labelled the dissidents as being under the influence of the CIA.

The party led by Rayamajhi contested the 1981 Rastriya Panchayat election, launching over 50 candidates. None of them were elected though.

Two years after the split, the Rayamajhi-led CPN held its fifth party congress. The congress, attended by 125 delegates from 32 districts, elected Rayamajhi as chairman of the party and Krishna Raj Burma as the new general secretary. Soon after the fifth congress, divisions reappeared inside the party. Again the participation in the Raj Sabha by Rayamajhi and accusations of his workings with the Panchayat system were the focal points of disagreements. In September 1983, Rayamajhi was expelled from the party at a national council meeting. Rayamajhi himself was absent at the meeting as well as a least 13 other members of 35-member national council of the party. Rayamajhi's followers regrouped and formed CPN. After the expulsion of Rayamajhi, the party became known as 'CPN (Burma)' (alternatively 'CPN (Varma)' or 'CPN (Verma)').

After the split, CPN (Burma) reoriented itself towards leftwing unity. The party developed good contacts with the Amatya-led CPN. During the 1990 Jana Andolan (People's Movement), CPN (Burma) formed part of the United Left Front. During the negotiations for starting the rewriting the constitution after the victory of the movement, CPN (Burma) was clearly amongst the most moderate elements inside ULF. When the interim government and the Constitution Recommendations Commission were formed, CPN (Burma) was left out.

CPN (Burma) had 35 candidates in the 1991 parliamentary election. It got 16698 votes (0.23%), and no MPs. Burma himself contested the Saptari-5 constituency.

=== Merger and dissolution ===
The party had merged itself with the Manadhar and Amatya-led groups to form the Communist Party of Nepal (United) after the 1991 parliamentary election. Soon thereafter, however, Burma split from CPN(United) and re-established his own party.

On 28 June 2001 CPN (Burma) merged into the Communist Party of Nepal (Unified Marxist-Leninist).

== Ideology ==
CPN (Burma) upheld the line of 'National Democracy Revolution', a programmatic line presented by Nikita Khrushchev in 1956 and adopted by the 1960 International Meeting of Communist and Workers Parties in Moscow. The party saw Nepal as a semifeudal and semicolonial country. As of the 1980s, it considered workers, agricultural workers, poor and middle peasants, middle class and intellectuals as friendly classes, and feudalists and capitalists as class enemies. CPN (Burma) considered restoration of democracy, i.e. freedom of speech, press and assembly under multi-party system, as the main task. Regarding chances in the economic structures, the party favoured gradual reform of the economy of the country. The party identified the contradiction between the people and the panchayat system as a direct contradiction, and the contradiction with feudalism as an indirect contradiction. Its programmatic documents did not specify a single main enemy of the party. The party proposed peaceful struggles against the panchayat system, discarding the idea of armed struggle against monarchy.

== Mass organisations ==
The students wing of the party was the Nepal National Students Federation. The Nepal Afro-Asian People's Unity Committee and the Nepal-Soviet Friendship and Cultural Association were linked to the party. The splits in the party affected these structures. NNSF and NAAPUC were divided, whilst the NSFCA remained formally united but the different groups continued to fight over the influence over the organisation.

== Electoral performance ==
Election	Leader	Votes		Seats	Position	Resulting government
Election	Leader	#	%	#	Position	Resulting government
1991	Krishna Raj Verma	16,698	0.23	0 / 109	10th	Congress

== See also ==
- List of communist parties in Nepal
