= Shashi Shrestha =

Nepali politician

- शशी श्रेष्ठ

Member of Parliament, Pratinidhi Sabha for CPN (Maoist Centre) party list
- Incumbent
- Assumed office 4 March 2018

Personal details
- Born: 2 January 1962 (age 64)
- Party: CPN (Maoist Centre)
- Other political affiliations: CPN (Fourth Convention); Samyukta Janamorcha; CPN (Unity Centre–Masal)

Shashi Shrestha (Nepali: शशी श्रेष्ठ) is a Nepalese politician, Central Committee member of Janamorcha Nepal (Amik Sherchan faction). She was appointed as Minister of State for Health and Population on 29 April 2007.

Shrestha is the head of the Janamorcha-supported All Nepal Women's Association.
