= Mohan Bikram Singh =

Nepali politician (b. 1935)

- मोहन विक्रम सिंह

Personal details
- Born: April 15, 1935
- Spouse: Durga Paudel
- Children: Ashok Singh (Son) Purwa Singh (Daughter) Bishwo Mohan GC (Son) Dibya Mohan GC (Son)
- Nickname: Gharti

Mohan Bikram Singh (born 15 April 1935), often referred to as MBS, party name Gharti, is a Nepalese communist politician. His father was a wealthy landlord in Pyuthan District who was close to King Tribhuvan. MBS however joined the opposition Nepali Congress in 1950, and took part in the 1950–1951 uprising for democracy.

MBS joined the united Communist Party of Nepal in 1953. He then began actively promoting communism and training local youth and peasants to oppose landholders in the area around Narikot, Pyuthan in 1953-54. This was taking place in the context of a growing nationwide peasant movement in Nepal in the post-Rana years of 1950-1960. Some of these initial activities were part of the local Progressive Study Group based at Ratamata-Vijayanagar, Pyuthan which was home to a communist training camp for local youth in 1953-54. Because of his local agitations he was arrested and spent 18 months in jail in Pyuthan, then in Salyan, until being released in 1956. In 1957 he was elected to the Central Committee of the party. In 1961, when the party was divided in different tendencies, MBS rallied the leftist sections, raising the demand for a Constituent Assembly. The line of MBS found much support amongst party grassroots, but he did not get any support from fellow Central Committee members. When the party was divided in 1962, MBS sided with the more radical Communist Party led by Tulsi Lal Amatya.

In 1971 MBS was released from jail. Man Mohan Adhikari had been released in 1969. Together with Shamburam Shrestha and Nirmal Lama they formed the 'Central Nucleus', which sought to unify with Communist Party of Nepal (Pushpa Lal). That merger never took off, and the Central Nucleus was divided. In 1974 MBS and Nirmal Lama held a 'Fourth Convention' of the Communist Party of Nepal (CPN). Effectively their faction constituted a separate party, Communist Party of Nepal (Fourth Convention).

In 1983 a split surged between MBS and Nirmal Lama. MBS went on to form a separate party, Communist Party of Nepal (Masal). This party would suffer several splits. In 1987 a major split occurred, after which MBS was left with leading a minority as the majority formed Communist Party of Nepal (Mashal).

During the Panchayat regime, MBS was based in Gorakhpur, India.

At the time of the 1990 popular uprising against the autocratic regime, MBS disagreed with the United Left Front in cooperating the Nepali Congress against the regime. He demanded a Constituent Assembly and advocated that armed struggle was necessary to fight the royal rule over the country. Communist Party of Nepal (Masal), Communist Party of Nepal (Mashal) and Communist Party of Nepal (Marxist-Leninist-Maoist) formed the United National People's Movement.

In 2002 CPN (Masal) merged with Communist Party of Nepal (Unity Centre), and formed Communist Party of Nepal (Unity Centre-Masal). MBS became the general secretary of the new party.

After the royal coup d'état on February 1, 2005 MBS went underground. Following the restoration of democratic rule, CPN(UC-M) was divided on issues like whether the party should join the coalition government. The party was divided into two, with the group led by MBS leaving the Seven Party Alliance and staying outside of the government. Singh's faction renamed itself as the Communist Party of Nepal (Masal).

Singh renewed his citizen certificate only in 2007, at the age of 72.

== Bibliography ==
- Cailmail, Benoît (2009). "A History of Nepalese Maoism since its Foundation by Mohan Bikram Singh" (PDF). European Bulletin of Himalayan Research (33–34): 11–38.
