= Communist Party of Nepal (Democratic) =

Communist Party of Nepal (Democratic) नेपाल कम्युनिस्ट पार्टी (प्रजातान्त्रिक)
- Founder: Bishnu Bahadur Manandhar
- Founded: 1979 as CPN (Manandhar)
- Dissolved: 1991
- Split from: CPN (Rayamajhi)
- Succeeded by: CPN (United)
- Ideology: Communism; Marxism–Leninism

Election symbol

Communist Party of Nepal (Democratic) was a splinter group of the Communist Party of Nepal (Rayamajhi) formed in 1979, in the backdrop of the popular movement that surged in that year. The party was led by Bishnu Bahadur Manandhar.

== History ==
The party was initially formed as the Communist Party of Nepal (Manandhar) in 1979. Bishnu Bahadur Manandhar and his supporters had broken away from CPN (Rayamajhi) because of the failure of Keshar Jang Rayamajhi to support the 1979 student protests and supporting the status quo. Manandhar accused Rayamajhi of being a royalist pointing to his appointment in the Royal Council.

The party was sympathetic to the Soviet Union and supported the Soviet intervention in Afghanistan in 1979.

Ahead of the 1991 parliamentary election the party changed its name to Communist Party of Nepal (Democratic). The party contested the 1991 general elections, two candidates from the party got elected out of the 75 candidates that had filed their candidacy. Two months after the election CPN (Democratic) merged with two other parties, Communist Party of Nepal (Burma) and Communist Party of Nepal (Amatya), to form Communist Party of Nepal (United).

== Electoral performance ==
Election	Leader	Votes		Seats	Position	Resulting government
Election	Leader	#	%	#	Position	Resulting government
1991	Bishnu Bahadur Manandhar	177,323	2.43	2 / 205	7th	Congress

== See also ==
- List of communist parties in Nepal
