= Communist Party of Nepal (Fourth Convention) =

Communist Party of Nepal (Fourth Convention) नेपाल कम्युनिष्ट पार्टी (चौथो महाधिवेशन)
- Founder: Mohan Bikram Singh; Nirmal Lama
- Founded: 15 September 1974
- Dissolved: 1990
- Split from: CPN (Amatya)
- Succeeded by: CPN (Unity Centre)
- Ideology: Communism; Marxism–Leninism
- Political position: Far-left

The Communist Party of Nepal (Fourth Convention) (Nepali: नेपाल कम्युनिष्ट पार्टी (चौथो महाधिवेशन), Nepala Kamyunishta Parti (Chautho Mahadhiveshan)) was a communist party in Nepal 1974–1990. It was the major communist group in Nepal during the latter part of the 1970s, but gradually lost influence due to internal disputes. The party actively participated in the struggle for democracy in 1990, and its leader took part in writing the Nepalese Constitution. It later merged with other forces to form the Communist Party of Nepal (Unity Centre), out of which the Communist Party of Nepal emerged.

== History ==
=== Founding ===
On September 15, 1974, Mohan Bikram Singh and Nirmal Lama organized a "Fourth Convention of the Communist Party of Nepal" at the Srikrishna Dharamshala, Varanasi, India. Other CPN fractions did not recognize this '4th convention', and effectively CPN(4th Convention) became a separate party. At the time the Central Committee of the party consisted of Mohan Bikram Singh (general secretary), Nirmal Lama (politburo member), Jaya Govinda Shah (politburo member), Bhakta Bahadur Shrestha (a.k.a. Sher Singh, alternate politburo member), Khampa Singh (alternate politburo member), Mohan Baidhya, Rishi Devkota, Suryanath Yadav, Khubiram Acharya, Chitra Bahadur K.C., Gangadhar Ghimire and Bhardhwaj.

Prior to this conference, both Lama and Singh had belonged to the 'Central Nucleus' group, gathering leftwing elements from the Amatya-led Communist Party of Nepal. The Central Nucleus, which initially had also included Manmohan Adhikari and Shambhuram Shrestha, had tried to reorganize the party and reunite with the Pushpa Lal group. However, such a merger never took off, partly due to Pushpa Lal's hesitation to merge his own faction into another party (since he claimed to represent the legacy of the original Communist Party of Nepal) and partly due to Pushpa Lal's wish to collaborate with the Nepali Congress against the royal regime (which MBS did not accept). In the end the Central Nucleus was divided.

By the mid-1970s, CPN (4th Convention) was the largest and most well-organised communist group in Nepal. The party would however disintegrate in internal divisions. In 1976 the Dang District Committee of the party revolted against the party leadership. The group published a document called Antar Party Sangarshkalagi (For inner-party struggle). The Dang District Committee broke away, and merged with the All Nepal Communist Revolutionary Coordination Committee (Marxist-Leninist).

In 1979 the Central Committee of the party published a document called Ranjinitik Simhavalokan (Political Appraisal), analysing the state of crisis inside the party. The party was unable to play any significant role in the emerging popular movements in Nepal (see 1979 student protests in Nepal). In 1980 a Central Committee member, Rishi Devkota (alias 'Azad') resigned from the party, accusing it of reformism and being soft on Soviet social imperialism.

=== Split ===
In 1983 the party suffered a serious split. In November 1983 the followers of MBS held a separate conference, and formed Communist Party of Nepal (Masal). Amongst those who followed MBS were Chitra Bahadur K.C., C.P. Gajurel, Mohan Baidhya, Khampa Singh, Bachaspati Devkota, Bhairav Regmi, R. Shrestha as well as future Maoist leaders like Pushpa Kamal Dahal and Baburam Bhattarai. The remainder, led by Nirmal Lama, continued to work under the name of CPN (4th Convention). The party held a National Organising Conference in December 1983. This was followed by a First National Conference of the party. In the conference there were 31 delegates from 17 districts, 17 observers and two representatives of the CPN (Masal) group. Notable members who stayed with CPN (4th Convention) were Jaya Govinda Shah, Suryanath Yadav, Dil Bahadur Shrestha, Nara Bahadur Karmacharya, Niranjan Chapagain, Shyam Shrestha and Kaila Ba (Devendra Lal Shrestha).

In a simplified manner one might say that the key issue behind the split was diverging opinion on who was the main enemy of the party. MBS claimed that the main enemy was Indian expansionism, which was backing up the royal house in Nepal. Since the Nepali Congress, according to him, were Indian puppets cooperation with them was not feasible. According to Lama was feudalism as the main enemy, and that the royal regime was propping up the feudal system. The main priority was to fight against the royal regime for a democratic opening, and thus fight against feudalism itself. To Lama, the Nepali Congress was a potential ally in this struggle.

== People's movement and transition to democracy ==
CPN (4th Convention) was a member of the United Left Front and took part in the uprising against the autocratic regime in 1990.

In November 1990, CPN (4th Convention) merged with Communist Party of Nepal (Mashal) and other smaller fractions, forming the Communist Party of Nepal (Unity Centre).

== Ideology ==
The party considered Nepal as a semi-feudal and semi-colonial country. The party identified the proletariat, peasants (ranging from poor to rich), petty bourgeoise and national capitalists as friendly classes, and saw feudal landlords and comprador-bureaucratic capitalists as class enemies.

== Mass organisations ==
All Nepal National Independent Students Union (Sixth) was the students wing of the party.

== See also ==
- List of communist parties in Nepal
