= 1991 Nepalese general election =

- 12 May 1991

All 205 seats in the House of Representatives 103 seats needed for a majority
- Turnout: 65.15%
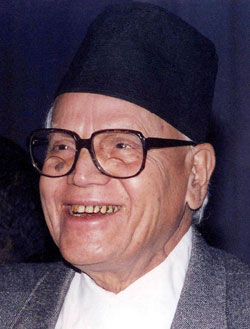

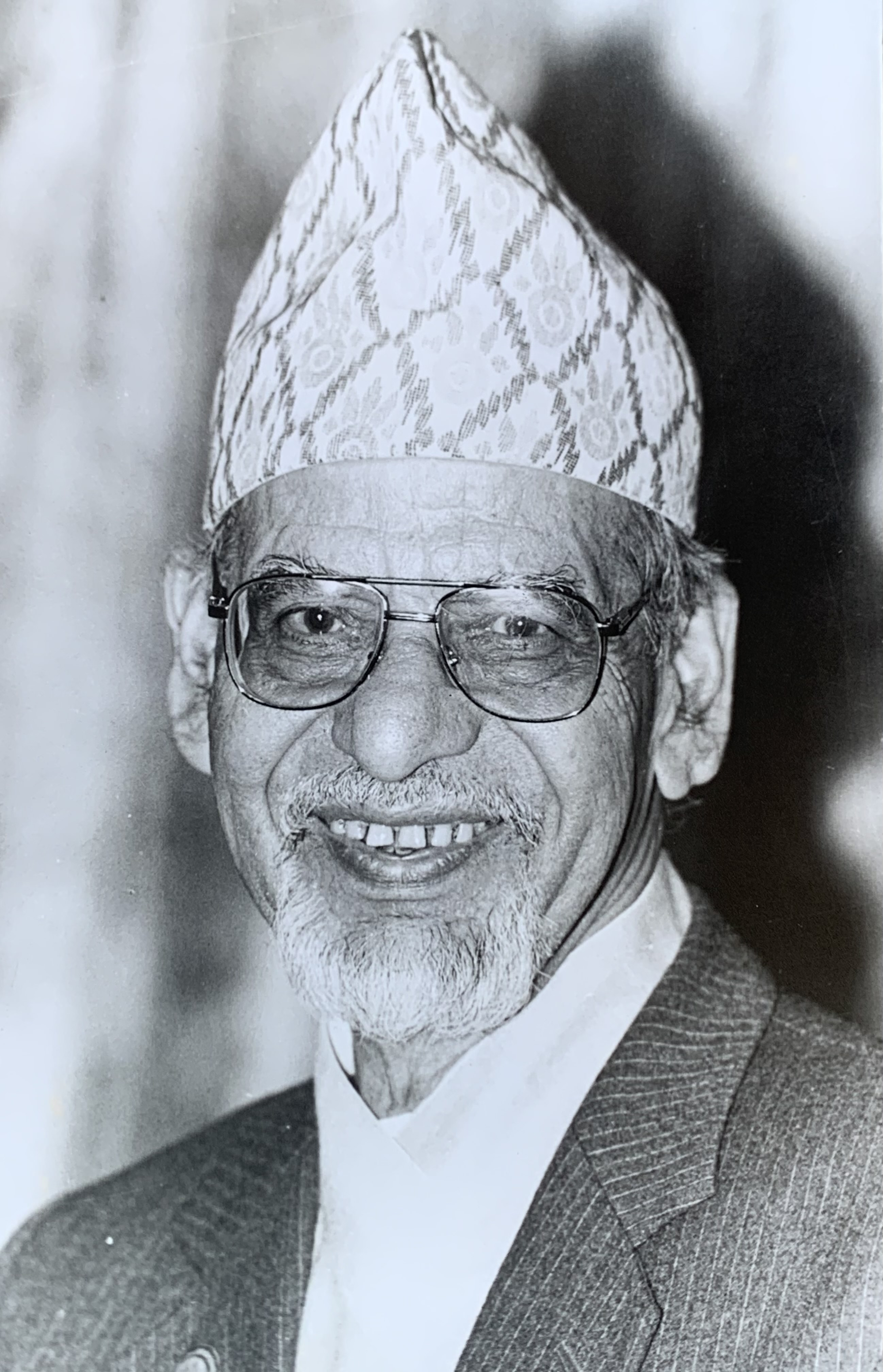

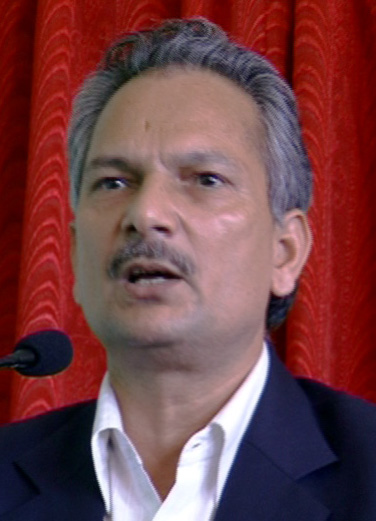

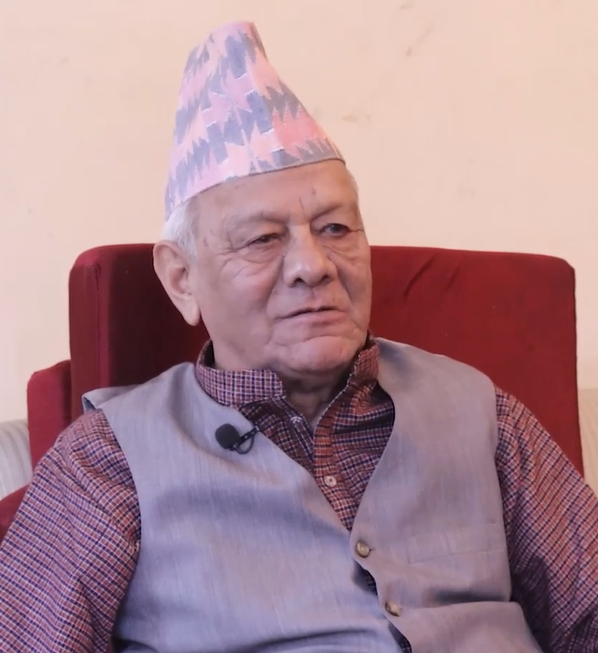

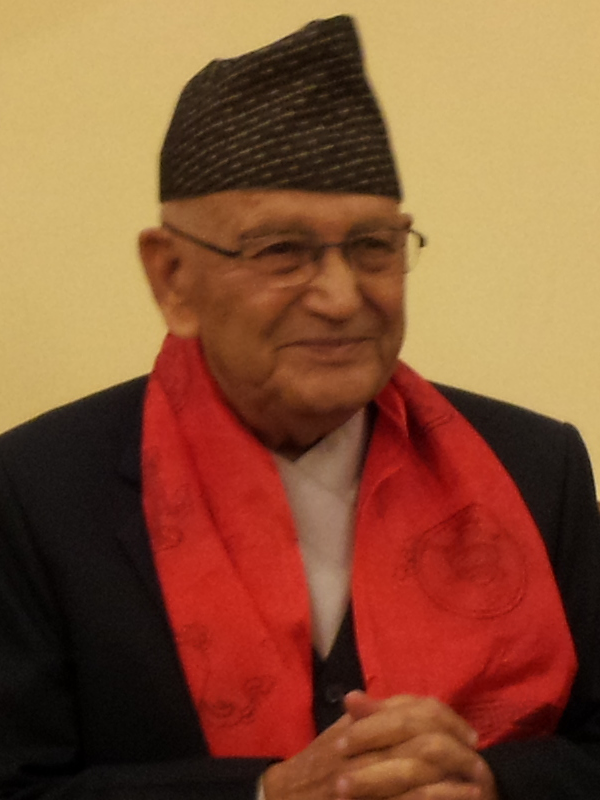
	First party	Second party	Third party
Leader	Krishna Prasad Bhattarai	Man Mohan Adhikari	Baburam Bhattarai
Party	Congress	CPN (UML)	SJM
Seats won	110	69	9
Popular vote	2,752,452	2,040,102	351,904
Percentage	39.50%	29.27%	5.05%
	Fourth party	Fifth party	Sixth party
Leader	Gajendra Narayan Singh	Lokendra Bahadur Chand	Surya Bahadur Thapa
Party	NSP	RPP (Chand)	RPP (Thapa)
Seats won	6	3	3
Popular vote	298,610	478,604	392,499
Percentage	4.28%	6.87%	5.63%
- Results by constituency
Prime Minister before election
Krishna Prasad Bhattarai
Congress
Prime Minister after election
Girija Prasad Koirala
Congress

General elections were held in Nepal on 12 May 1991, to elect 205 members to the House of Representatives. The elections were the first multi-party elections since 1959 and were a result of the 1990 revolution forcing King Birendra to restore a multi-party system.

Although the Nepali Congress won the most seats, its leader Krishna Prasad Bhattarai lost in his own constituency, Kathmandu 1. The chairman of the Communist Party of Nepal (UML), Man Mohan Adhikari, was elected in Sunsari 1, whilst Madan Bhandari, another prominent leader of the party, was elected in both Kathmandu 1 and Kathmandu 5.

== Results ==
Party	Votes	%	Seats
Nepali Congress	2,752,452	39.50	110
Communist Party of Nepal (Unified Marxist–Leninist)	2,040,102	29.27	69
Rastriya Prajatantra Party (Chand)	478,604	6.87	3
Rashtriya Prajatantra Party (Thapa)	392,499	5.63	1
United People's Front of Nepal	351,904	5.05	9
Nepal Sadbhawana Party	298,610	4.28	6
Communist Party of Nepal (Democratic)	177,323	2.54	2
Nepal Workers Peasants Party	91,335	1.31	2
Rastriya Janamukti Party	34,509	0.50	0
Communist Party of Nepal (Burma)	16,698	0.24	0
Janata Dal (Samajbadi Prajatantrik)	5,760	0.08	0
Nepal Rastriya Jana Party	5,732	0.08	0
Communist Party of Nepal (Amatya)	4,846	0.07	0
Rastriya Janata Party (H)	4,406	0.06	0
Rastriya Janata Party (Nepal)	4,280	0.06	0
Nepal Conservative Party	2,562	0.04	0
Bahu Jana Janatadal	2,012	0.03	0
Janawadi Morcha Nepal	1,518	0.02	0
Ekata Party	94	0.00	0
Dalit Majdoor Kisan Party	92	0.00	0
Independents	303,723	4.36	3
Total	6,969,061	100.00	205
Valid votes	6,969,061	95.58	
Invalid/blank votes	322,023	4.42	
Total votes	7,291,084	100.00	
Registered voters/turnout	11,191,777	65.15	

== Aftermath ==
Following the result of the election, Nepali Congress came to power and Girija Prasad Koirala became Prime Minister. The House met for the first time in May 1991. Daman Nath Dhungana served as the Speaker of the House. The parliament could not complete its full five-year term with Koirala asking King Birendra to dissolve the house in July 1994 after losing a no-confidence motion with some members of his own party voting against him.

== See also ==
- 2nd House of Representatives (Nepal)
