= Bachaspati Devkota =

Nepalese politician

Personal details
- Party: CPN (UML)

Bachaspati Devkota (Nepali - वाचस्पति देवकोटा) is a Nepali politician. He is a member of Communist Party of Nepal (Unified Marxist–Leninist). In 1967, he actively took part nationwide student movement for the free student union and eventually became one of the founder members of the All Nepal National Free Students' Union (ANNFSU), one of the strongest students organization of Nepal.

He was born in Baglung District from parents of Gorkha District. He got his primary education at home in Gorkha and later went to Kathmandu for further educations. In 1964, he took the membership of the Communist Party of Nepal (CPN). He actively fought against the Panchayat Government for a free students' union and became the first President-elect of the Free Students' Union at the Bikas Bhawan High School, Kathmandu.

He was a politburo member of Communist party of Nepal (Masal). He left this group of the communist party and joined the mainstream movement of communism called Communist Party of Nepal (Unified Marxist–Leninist) CPN-UML. From 1992 to 2014, he was an elected member of the Central Committee (CCM) of the CPN - UML.

From 1994 to 1998, he took charge of the Madan-Ashrit Memorial Foundation as well as of the Central Teachers' Fraction in the capacity of President. From 1990 to 1994, he was in-Charge of the Gandaki Zonal activities of the CPN-UML. Since 2014, he is a member of central advisory committee of CPN UML.

From 1999 to 2005, he was a member of the National Assembly (The Upper House of the Parliament) for a 6-year term and from 2001-2003, he was the Chairman of Delegated Legislation Committee of this house. From Jun 2004 to February 2005 he was a Minister of Population and Environment (MOPE) in the Government of Nepal.
