= Nepal Rastriya Dalit Mukti Sangathan =

Nepal Rastriya Dalit Mukti Sangathan (Nepali: नेपाल राष्ट्रिय दलित मुक्ति संगठन) is a Nepalese Dalit movement, linked to Janamorcha Nepal. Ahuti is the general secretary of the organisation. Ranendra Baraili is the president of the organisation.
