= Communist Party of Nepal (Amatya) =

Nepalese political party

Communist Party of Nepal (Amatya) नेपाल कम्युनिस्ट पार्टी (आमात्य)
- Founder: Tulsi Lal Amatya
- Founded: 1962
- Dissolved: 1994
- Split from: Communist Party of Nepal; CPN (United) in 1992
- Merged into: CPN (United) in 1991; CPN (Unified ML)
- Ideology: Communism; Marxism–Leninism
- Political position: Far-left

The Communist Party of Nepal, also referred to as the Communist Party of Nepal (Amatya), was a communist party in Nepal. It emerged from a split in the original Communist Party of Nepal (CPN) in 1962. The CPN had been ravaged by internal conflicts due to the Sino-Soviet split and differences of how to relate to political changes in the country.

== History ==
In April 1962, the radical sector of the Communist Party of Nepal convened a 3rd party convention in Varanasi, India, but the preparation of the congress had been full of controversy. The congress approved the programme of National Democratic Revolution proposed by Tulsi Lal Amatya, and elected Tulsi Lal as general secretary. In an attempt to maintain the unity of the party, Pushpa Lal Shrestha and Tulsi Lal were to share central leadership responsibilities. Keshar Jung Rayamjhi, the leader of the pro-Soviet faction of CPN was expelled. However, the Rayamajhi-led section did not recognize the convention, and Rayamjhi's followers continued to function as a separate party, also using the name Communist Party of Nepal.

=== Sino-Soviet split, 1963–1968 ===
Between Amatya and Pushpa Lal, there were political differences. Amatya favoured the idea of national democracy, whereas Pushpa Lal advocated the line of people's democracy. From 1963 onwards, the two worked separately.

As a result of the Sino-Soviet split, the Soviet leadership and their supporters had tried to court both Pushpa Lal Shrestha and Tulsi Lal Amatya. Pushpa Lal had rejected the line proposed by the Soviets as revisionist, but Amatya had accepted the proposal. In May 1968, the section of Pushpa Lal organized a separate convention in Gorakhpur, India. Pushpa Lal condemned the Soviet line in the convention and supported the line advocated by the Chinese Communist Party as the correct line of the global communist movement. This led to the founding of a separate party, with Pushpa Lal as general secretary. The majority of the party leadership followed Pushpa Lal in joining his splinter group. This party became known as the Communist Party of Nepal (Pushpa Lal).

=== Further splits ===
In 1971, a group of CPN leaders (Manmohan Adhikari, Shambhu Ram, and Mohan Bikram Singh) were released from jail. They formed the Central Nucleus, which tried to unify with Pushpa Lal's group. That unity proved impossible and the Central Nucleus gave way to new parties. Adhikari formed his own CPN, the Communist Party of Nepal (Manmohan). This party developed close relations to the Communist Party of India (Marxist). Singh's group became known as the Communist Party of Nepal (Fourth Convention).

The Amatya-led party was reduced to become one of many clandestine communist factions in Nepal, and it was readily outgrown by several of its splinter groups. The party was generally identified as part of the pro-Soviet Union stream within the Nepalese communist movement, although it maintained some independence towards Moscow.

=== End of Panchayat and dissolution, 1989–1994 ===
In 1989, the party took part in the formation of the United Left Front, to struggle against the autocratic regime. Following the overthrow of the regime and the democratic opening, the party contested the 1991 Nepalese general election. The party put up 14 candidates, who together mustered 4846 votes. None of the candidates of the party were elected.

Soon after the 1991 general election, the party had merged itself with two other groups to form the Communist Party of Nepal (United). However, that unity turned short-lived, as Tulsi Lal Amatya broke away from the CPN (United) and reconstituted his own party. In 1994, the CPN (Amatya) joined the Communist Party of Nepal (Unified Marxist-Leninist).

== Electoral performance ==
Election	Leader	Votes		Seats	Position	Resulting government
Election	Leader	No.	%	No.	Position	Resulting government
1991	Tulsi Lal Amatya	4,846	0.07	0 / 109	13th	Congress

== See also ==
- List of communist parties in Nepal
