= Manmohan Memorial Polytechnic =

Technical college in Nepal

- मनमोहन स्मृति पोलिटेक्निक
- Established: 2008 A.D. (2065 B.S.)
- Principal: Sudip Adhikari
- Students: 576 (approximately)
- Location: Hattimuda VDC, Morang, Nepal
- Website: www.mmp.edu.np

Manmohan Memorial Polytechnic (MMP) is a technical college located in Budhiganga-4, Morang, Province 1, Nepal. It is 12 kilometres (7.5 mi) away from Biratnagar, an industrial town in eastern Nepal.

The Polytechnic was established with an assistance of NRs.46 Crores from the Government of India under India-Nepal Economic Cooperation Programme with the name of former Prime Minister of Nepal Late Man Mohan Adhikari and is the first of its kind in the country. The college has status of partnership college of CTEVT (Council for Technical Education and Vocational Trainings, Nepal) but accredited by Government of Nepal as autonomous college. It offers Diploma in Engineering (IE) course in multiple disciplines. It also provides trainings to disadvantaged and unemployed groups of people in specific skills through short term modularized training programs.

The polytechnic started running in 2008 while it was formally inaugurated on November 2, 2009, by former Prime Minister of Nepal, Madhav Kumar Nepal.

The college provides various levels of programmes, up to now Diploma in Mechanical, Electrical, Electronics, Civil, Architecture and Electrical & Electronics.

In 2019 AD, Government of Province number 1 announced that Manmohan Technical University will be established and Manmohan Memorial Polytechnic will be its constituent college.
