= Nepal Utpidit Dalit Jatiya Mukti Samaj =

Nepal Utpidit Dalit Jatiya Mukti Samaj (Nepali: नेपाल उत्पीडित दलित जातीय मुक्ति समाज) is a Nepalese Dalit movement. The organization emerged in the wake of the 1990 democracy movement as the major Dalit movement in the country. Nepal Udpidit Dalit Jatiya Mukti Samaj was founded in 1992, through the merger of two previous organizations - the Nepal Rastriya Dalit Jana Bikas Parishad and the Utpidit Jatiya Utthan Manch.

The organization was nominally non-partisan. It was politically linked to the Communist Party of Nepal (Unified Marxist-Leninist). As of the early 1990s, the majority of the Central Committee members of the organization belonged to CPN(UML), but there were also members of the Samyukta Jana Morcha (Bhattarai group), Samyukta Jana Morcha (Lilamoni group) and some independents. The organization worked for the abolishment of untouchability and for the inclusion of Dalits in political participation.

When the CPN(UML) was split in March 1998, a major split also followed in the Mukti Samaj with the emergence of the Nepal Udpidit Jatiya Mukti Samaj as a parallel organization.
