= Keshar Jung Rayamajhi =

Nepalese politician (1919-2012)

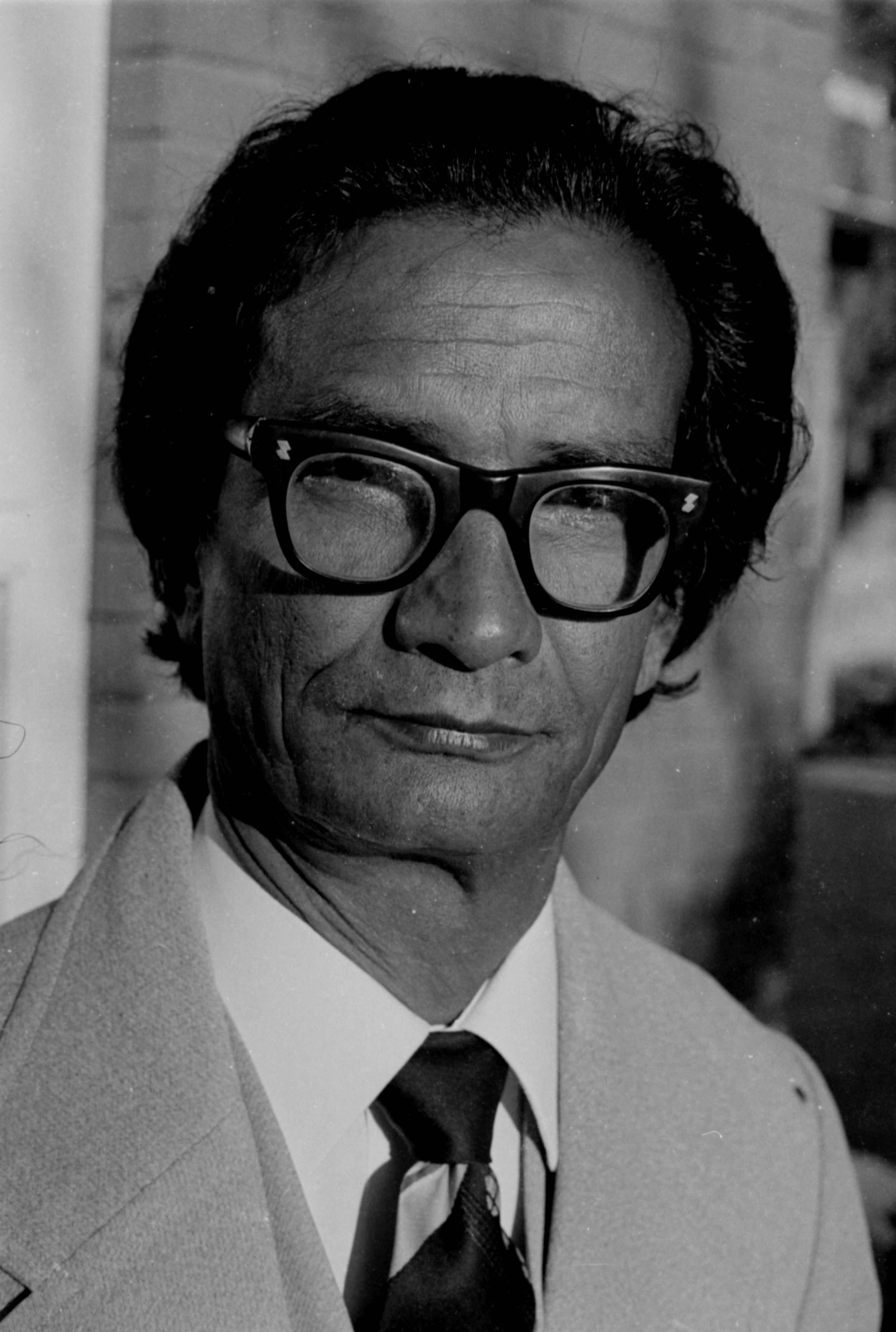

Personal details
- Born: 1919 Tansen Palpa
- Died: 17 December 2012
- Party: Janata Dal (Samajbadi Prajatantrik)

Keshar Jung Rayamajhi (1919 – 17 December 2012) (Nepali: केशरजंग रायमाझी) was a Nepalese politician. He was a leading figure in the communist movement in the country, but later turned into a royalist. Rayamajhi hails from a landlord Chhetri family in Tansen, Palpa district.

In 1947 Rayamajhi became a founding member of the Nepalese 'Marxist Study Circle' in Calcutta. In 1948, the group was reconstructed as the 'Progressive Study Circle' and Rayamajhi became its secretary. During his stay in Calcutta, Rayamajhi's political mentor was the CPI leader Ratna Lal Brahmin.

At the first congress of the Communist Party of Nepal, held in 1954, Rayamajhi was elected to the Central Committee of the party. In September 1956, the general secretary of the party, Manmohan Adhikari, travelled to China to take part in the congress of the Chinese Communist Party. As Pushpa Lal Shrestha and D.P. Adhikari declined to take the role of acting general secretary, Rayamajhi expressed his interest in taking over as acting general secretary of the party. Directly after Rayamajhi became acting general secretary of the party, groupism began to appear amongst the party ranks. The party became divided into a reformist camp (led by Rayamajhi) and a revolutionary camp (led by Pushpa Lal Shrestha).

During the second party congress held in 1957, Manmohan Adhikari was undergoing treatment for skin disease in China. In his absence, Rayamajhi was elected general secretary of the party. At the congress, Rayamajhi argued for supporting constitutional monarchy. Soon after the congress, accusations that Rayamajhi had secret links to the royal palace began to surface within the party.

Rayamajhi was one of the CPN candidates that contested the 1959 parliamentary election, but was defeated in his constituency. In the election the party got less than 4% of the seats in the parliament. Rayamajhi received severe criticism for the electoral defeat of the party after the election.

In November 1960 Rayamajhi travelled to Moscow to take part in the International Meeting of Communist and Workers Parties. During Rayamajhi's stay in the Soviet Union the King retook direct rule in Nepal. Rayamajhi sent a message from Moscow stating that the dissolution of the parliament was a 'progressive step'. Under the new order in Nepal the CPN was banned. After his return to Nepal in January 1961, Rayamajhi called for lifting the ban on political parties. But at the same time he continued for argue in favour of guided democracy and constitutional monarchy.

In March 1961 a plenum of the party was held in Darbhanga (India). The plenum decided to remove Rayamajhi from the position as general secretary. Instead a central secretariat consisting of Rayamajhi, D.P. Adhikari and Shambhuram Shrestha was formed to run the party.

In April 1962 the sector of CPN led by Tulsi Lal Amatya and Pushpa Lal Shrestha held a third party congress, which the sector around Rayamajhi did not recognize. The congress decided to expel Rayamajhi from the party. Rayamajhi and his followers continued to function as a party though. Effectively the CPN was divided into two separate parties, a CPN led by Amatya and a CPN led by Rayamajhi. The Rayamajhi group held its own third party congress in 1967, and elected Rayamajhi as general secretary.

In 1979 a section of the party, led by Bishnu Bahadur Manandhar, revolted against Rayamajhi's membership in the royal Rajsabha and his soft line towards the monarchy. Manandhar eventually left the party in 1981, taking a large section of its membership with him. Two years later the party held its fifth congress, which elected Rayamajhi chairman and Krishna Raj Burma general secretary. In September 1983 Rayamajhi was expelled from the party by Burma for being a royalist. Rayamajhi then reorganised his followers into a new CPN, in which he was elected general secretary. Eventually this new CPN also expelled him around 1986.

Rayamajhi was included in the interim government after the 1990 Jana Andolan ('People's Movement') as Minister of Education. He was also appointed to the three-member Cabinet Committee to oversee the constitutional proposal of the Constitution Recommendations Commission, representing the King.

Rayamajhi contested the Kathmandu-3 constituency in the 1991 parliamentary election, on behalf of his new party Janata Dal (Samajbadi Prajatantrik). Rayamajhi finished eight in the constituency.

== Chairman of the Royal Privy Council ==
Rayamajhi went on to become the chairman of the Royal Privy Council. In his function as chairman of the council, Rayamajhi oversaw the dramatic change in the royal house that followed the Nepalese royal massacre and the coronation of Gyanendra Shah.

On November 13, 2002, Maoist rebels carried out an armed attack on the residence of Rayamajhi. In November 2003, Maoists attacked his ancestral home.
