= Motidevi Shrestha =

Nepalese politician

- मोतीदेवी श्रेष्ठ

Personal details
- Born: 1913; Lalitpur, Nepal
- Died: 1997 (aged 83–84)
- Citizenship: Nepali
- Political party: Communist Party of Nepal

Motidevi Shrestha (Nepali: मोतीदेवी श्रेष्ठ; 1913–1997) was a Nepalese politician.

She was born in 1913 in Lalitpur, Nepal. She was one of the founding members of the Communist Party of Nepal. Shrestha died in 1997.

In 2011, the Government of Nepal issued a stamp featuring Shrestha.
