= Communist Party of Nepal (2006) =

Short-lived political party in Nepal

Communist Party of Nepal (2006) (Nepali: नेपाल कम्युनिष्ट पार्टी (२००६)) was a communist party in Nepal. It was formed in 2006, after a split in the Communist Party of Nepal (Unity Centre-Masal). Bijaya Kumar is the general secretary of the party and Narendra Man KC is the party spokesman.

Soon after its formation, the party merged into the Communist Party of Nepal.

== See also ==
- List of communist parties in Nepal
