= All Nepal Democratic Youth Association =

ANDYA flag

All Nepal Democratic Youth Association (Nepali: अखिल नेपाल जनवादी युवा संघ, abbreviated अनेजयु संघ, anejayu sangh) was a political youth movement in Nepal, the youth wing of Janamorcha Nepal. The 6th national congress of ANDYA was held in Dhulikhel, February 2007.

On December 25, 2002 ANDYA Bardiya secretary Top Bahadur Karki was killed by the Royal Nepal Army.

On February 25, 2009 ANDYA and the Young Communist League merged into YCL-Nepal.
