= Back to the Village National Campaign =

Nepali Panchayat campaign

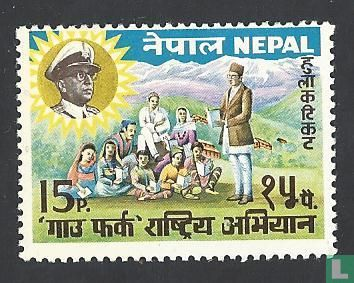
Stamp featuring the campaign c. 1967

Back to the Village National Campaign (Nepali: गाउँ फर्क राष्ट्रिय अभियान) was a campaign of Nepal's Panchayat regime from 1967 to 1975. It aimed to direct development efforts to rural areas where the majority of the Nepali people live.

As part of the program which was originally known as "Go to Village" National Campaign, civil servants and students from the cities were sent to live in rural communities and participate in development work and serve as teachers in village schools. Back to the Village was one of the major initiatives of king Mahendra who ruled the country from 1955 to 1972.

In 1975, an amendment to the constitution turned the Back to the Village institution into a system for holding indirect elections. Its purpose became to select and endorse candidates for political office. The system was scrapped and direct elections introduced by another amendment in 1980.

The Panchayat system itself collapsed in 1990 following popular protests, and parliamentary democracy was established in Nepal.

== See also ==
- Down to the Countryside Movement
