= Communist Party of Nepal (Matri Samuha) =

Communist Party of Nepal (Matri Samuha) was a small communist party in Nepal. The group was formed by Keshar Jung Rayamajhi after he was expelled from the pro-Soviet Communist Party of Nepal in September 1983, due to his pro-monarchic actions. Rayamjhi's new party held a 'Special Congress' in March 1984. The congress elected Rayamjhi as the general secretary of the new formation. After 1985, the party became largely dormant. By 1986 there were reports that Rayamjhi had been however soon expelled from the party, which after his expulsion took the name 'Matri Samuha' ('Mother Group').

== See also ==
- List of communist parties in Nepal
