= United People's Front of Nepal =

United People's Front Nepal संयुक्त जनामोर्चा नेपाल
- Abbreviation: SJMN
- Founded: 1991
- Dissolved: 2002
- Succeeded by: Janamorcha Nepal
- National affiliation: CPN (Unity Centre)

The United People's Front of Nepal (Nepali: संयुक्त जनमोर्चा नेपाल, romanized: Sanyukta Janamorcha Nepal), abbreviated SJM, was the front of the Communist Party of Nepal (Unity Centre), or CPN (UC).

== History ==
=== Formation ===
SJM was founded in 1991, with Baburam Bhattarai as its chairman. Except for the CPN (UC), the Nepal Workers Peasants Organisation and the Nepal Marxist–Leninist Party, later known as CPN (MLM), took part in the formation. Both factions did however leave the Front rather soon, the NWPO left just before the 1991. After the SJM was restructured on August 17, 1991, the CPN (MLM) left it. The CPN (MLM) cited that the Front has become a mere "rubber stamp" of CPN (UC).

=== 1991 general election ===
In the general election held in 1991, SJM won nine seats and became the third largest force in the parliament.

=== 1992 general strike and municipal election ===
In 1992, in a situation of economic crisis and chaos, with spiralling prices as a result of implementation of changes in policy of the new Nepali Congress government, SJM and CPN (UC) stepped up their political agitation. A Joint People's Agitation Committee was set up together with the Communist Party of Nepal (Masal), the Nepal Communist League and the Communist Party of Nepal (Marxist–Leninist–Maoist). A general strike was called for April 6.

Violent incidents began to occur on the evening ahead of the strike. The Joint People's Agitation Committee had called for a 30-minute lights out in the capital, and violent erupted outside Bir Hospital when activists tried to enforce the 'lights out'. At dawn on April 6, clashes between strike activists and police outside a police station in Pulchok (Patan) left two activists dead.

Later in the day, a mass rally of the Agitation Committee at Tundikhel in the capital Kathmandu was attacked by police forces. As a result, riots broke out, and the Nepal Telecommunications building was set on fire. Police opened fire at the crowd, killing several persons. The Human Rights Organisation of Nepal estimated that 14 people, including several on-lookers, had been killed in police firing.

Ahead of the elections to local bodies the year SJM formed a front together with the Nepal Workers Peasants Party, Communist Party of Nepal (Marxist–Leninist–Maoist), Communist Party of Nepal (15 September 1949) and Nepal Communist League. SJM obtained one deputy mayor, 8 (1.34%) municipal committee seats and around 5% of the seats in the Village Development Committees.

=== Split ahead of the 1994 general election ===
When CPN (UC) split in 1994, so did SJM on May 22. The hardline faction (which would later rename itself as Communist Party of Nepal (Maoist) in 1996) under the leadership of Prachandra and Dr. Baburam Bhattarai launched a parallel SJM. The mainstream group, led by Niranjan Govinda Vidya and Nirmal Lama was the one accorded the recognition by the Election Commission to the name SJM. On July 14 the Vidya/Lama-led SJM held its convention and decided to participate in upcoming elections.

=== Evolution of the Lama-led SJM ===
At the last legislative elections before the King of Nepal took power, 3 and 16 May 1999, the SJM won 0.86% of the popular vote and 1 out of 205 seats. In total, it had 40 candidates.

When CPN (UC) merged with Communist Party of Nepal (Masal) in 2002, SJM merged with Rashtriya Jana Morcha, the front of CPN (Masal), and formed the People's Front, Nepal.

== Electoral performance ==
Election	Leader	Votes		Seats		Position	Resulting government
Election	Leader	No.	%	No.	+/-	Position	Resulting government
1991	Baburam Bhattarai	351,904	4.83	9 / 205		5th	In opposition
1994	Nirmal Lama	100,285	1.32	0 / 205	▼9	5th	Extra-parliamentary
1999	Nirmal Lama	70,119	0.81	1 / 205	▲1	▼6th	In opposition
