= Communist Party of Nepal (Unity Centre–Masal) =

Communist Party of Nepal (Unity Centre–Masal) नेपाल कम्युनिष्ट पार्टी (एकता केन्द्र–मसाल)
- Founder: Mohan Bikram Singh
- Founded: 22 April 2002
- Dissolved: January 2009
- Merger of: CPN (Unity Centre); CPN (Masal)
- Succeeded by: UCPN (Maoist)
- Electoral front: Janamorcha Nepal
- Ideology: Communism; Marxism–Leninism–Maoism
- Political position: Far-left

Party flag

The Communist Party of Nepal (Unity Centre–Masal) (Nepali: नेपाल कम्युनिष्ट पार्टी (एकता केन्द्र–मसाल)), abbreviated CPN (UC–M) was an underground communist party in Nepal. The CPN (UC–M) was formed in 2002 through the merger of Communist Party of Nepal (Unity Centre) and Communist Party of Nepal (Masal).

== History ==
The merger of the two parties was announced at a public meeting on April 22, 2002, by the general secretaries of the two parties, Ram Singh Shris of CPN (Masal) and Narayan Kaji Shrestha (Prakash) of CPN (UC). The founding general secretary of CPN (UC–M) was Mohan Bikram Singh. The two electoral mass fronts of the two parties, Samyukta Janamorcha Nepal and Rastriya Janamorcha, merged to form Janamorcha Nepal. The Janamorcha Nepal joined the Seven Party Alliance and took an active part in the 2006 Loktantra Andolan.

=== Splits and dissolution ===
After the end of the direct-rule by King Gyandendra in April 2006 the CPN (Unity Centre–Masal) was split into four. A minor faction broke away and formed the Communist Party of Nepal (2006), the party later merged into the CPN (Maoist) Mohan Bikram Singh broke away and formed a parallel CPN (Unity Centre–Masal), which later renamed itself to CPN (Masal). The party also formed a parallel Janamorcha Nepal, later Rastriya Janamorcha, led by Chitra Bahadur K.C. and took away with three members of the Interim Parliament from Janamorcha Nepal because of Singh's opposition towards joining the interim government. The other split emerged when Ram Singh Sris broke away with two members of the Interim Parliament from Janamorcha Nepal. The faction also had its own parallel Janamorcha Nepal led by Chitra Bahadur Ale. The faction later merged with other splinter groups of other communist parties and formed CPN (Unified).

After various splits in the party, Narayan Kaji Shrestha became the general secretary. The party joined the Communist Party of Nepal to form the Unified Communist Party of Nepal (Maoist) on 13 January 2009. The women's wing of CPN (UC–M) is led by Surya Thapa (president) and Anjana Bisankhe (general secretary). The students wing of CPN (UC–M) was All Nepal National Free Students Union (Unified), while the cultural wing of CPN (UC–M) was called Indreni-Raktim Cultural Family. Fronts in India included All India Nepalese Unity Society (Mainstream) and All India Nepali Students Association. The CPN (UC–M) participated in the International Conference of Marxist–Leninist Parties and Organizations (International Newsletter).

== Ideology ==
The CPN (Unity Centre–Masal) adhered to Marxism–Leninism–Mao Zedong Thought as its ideological basis. CPN (UC–M) favoured a negotiated settlement of the Nepalese Civil War. Their proposal, put forward together with other leftists, was to hold a constituent assembly. The party also opposed US involvement in Nepal.

== See also ==
- Communist Party of Nepal (Marxist–Leninist–Maoist Centre)
- Communist Party of Nepal (Unity Centre)
- List of communist parties in Nepal
