= Communist Party of Nepal (Janamukhi) =

The Communist Party of Nepal (Janamukhi) (Nepali: नेपाल कम्युनिष्ट पार्टी (जनमुखी)) was a communist splinter group in Nepal. The party was led by Rupchandra Bista. A group around Ram Narayan Bidari broke away from the party, and joined the Communist Party of Nepal (Unity Centre) in 1990.

== See also ==
- List of communist parties in Nepal
