= Janamorcha Nepal =

Janamorcha Nepal जनमोर्चा नेपाल
- Leader: Lila Mani Pokhrel
- Founded: 10 July 2002
- Dissolved: 13 January 2009
- Merger of: Samyukta Janamorcha Nepal; Rastriya Janamorcha
- Merged into: UCPN (Maoist)

Election symbol

Janamorcha Nepal (Nepali: जनमोर्चा नेपाल, lit. 'People's Front Nepal') was founded in 2002 as the mass organisation and electoral front of the Communist Party of Nepal (Unity Centre–Masal). It was formed following the merger between the Communist Party of Nepal (Unity Centre) and the Communist Party of Nepal (Masal) when their respective fronts Samyukta Janamorcha Nepal and the Rashtriya Jana Morcha joined together on 10 July 2002.

== History ==
The party was formed with a 51-member ad hoc committee under the chairmanship of Amik Sherchan targeting the proposed general elections in November 2002.

=== Jana Andolan ===
During the Loktantra Andolan uprising of 2006 Janamorcha Nepal joined the Seven Party Alliance. After the end of the direct rule by King Gyanendra, Janamorcha Nepal was split into three along with its main party, the Communist Party of Nepal (Unity Centre–Masal). The party initially had six members in the Interim Parliament. A group led by Chitra Bahadur K.C. split along with three members of the Interim Parliament. This group later reconstituted the Rastriya Janamorcha. Another group led by Chitra Bahadur Ale split with two members of the Interim Parliament and later merged with other communist factions and formed Communist Party of Nepal (Unified). Lila Mani Pokharel was the only member of parliament renaming in the original Janamorcha Nepal. He was later joined by three more nominated members; Asarphi Sada, Anjana Bisankhe and Kaman Singh Lama. Janamorcha Nepal retained its membership in the ruling Eight Party Alliance and Giriraj Mani Pokharel and Shahi Shrestha joined the interim government as Minister for Health and State Minister for Health respectively.

=== Constituent Assembly election and dissolution ===
The party contested the 2008 Constituent Assembly elections and gained seven seats; two in direct elections, five from party list, in the 1st Constituent Assembly. Narayan Kaji Shrestha was later nominated to the Constituent Assembly taking their total to eight seats.

In August 2008, Sherchan was deposed as chairman of Janamorcha Nepal and suspended for three months, after having urged support for Ram Baran Yadav in the presidential election. Lila Mani Pokhrel was appointed acting chairman by the Central Committee of Janamorcha Nepal.

In October 2008, the Janamorcha Nepal and its mother party, CPN (Centre–Masal) merged with CPN (Maoist) to form the Unified Communist Party of Nepal (Maoist). Amik Sherchan, Lila Mani Pokharel and Giriraj Mani Pokharel were inducted into the Standing Committee of the new party.

== Electoral performance ==
| Election | Leader | Votes | | Seats | | Position | Resulting government |
| Election | Leader | No. | % | No. | +/- | Position | Resulting government |
|---|---|---|---|---|---|---|---|
| 2008 | Amik Sherchan | 164,381 | 1.53 | 7 / 575 | | 9th | In coalition with the CPN (Maoist Centre), CPN (UML), MJFN, Sadbhavana, and CPN (United) |

== See also ==
- All Nepal Democratic Youth Association
