= 1980 Nepalese governmental system referendum =

- 2 May 1980

Results
Choice	Votes	%
Panchayat system	2,433,452	54.79%
Multi-party system	2,007,965	45.21%
Valid votes	4,441,417	92.27%
Invalid or blank votes	372,069	7.73%
Total votes	4,813,486	100.00%
Registered voters/turnout	7,192,451	66.92%
Results by district
Panchayat 50-60% 60-70% 70-80% 80-90% >90%	Multi-party 50-60% 60-70%

A referendum on the system of government was held in Nepal on 2 May 1980. Voters were offered the choice between a non-partisan panchayat system and a multi-party system. The panchayat system received a slim majority of 54.99%, whereas Multi-Party System only received 45.2% of the total votes. Voter turnout was 66.9%.

== Background ==
With the backdrop of mass student protests against his rule in the spring of 1979, King Birendra made a public declaration on May 23, 1979, that a referendum with universal adult suffrage with secret vote would be held in which the people of Nepal would be able to choose between introducing a multiparty system or retain the non-party panchayat regime.

On 21 January 1980, King Birendra published the Referendum Rules, stating that after the referendum 'His Majesty shall make such provisions in the Constitution of Nepal as may deem necessary'.

== Method of voting ==
Nepalese citizens aged 21 and above were eligible to vote. The voters would mark their choice by stamping either of two colours on the ballot paper, blue for the multiparty system and yellow for the non-party panchayat system. It was speculated at the time that the choice of colours had not been coincidental, since the yellow colour was associated with saintly religious qualities. There is no empirical evidence though, that the choice of colours affected the outcome of the vote.

== Results ==
Panchayat system or Multiparty system?
Choice	Votes	%
Panchayat system	2,443,452	54.89
Multiparty system	2,007,965	45.11
Total	4,451,417	100.00
Valid votes	4,441,417	92.27
Invalid/blank votes	372,069	7.73
Total votes	4,813,486	100.00
Registered voters/turnout	7,192,451	66.92
Source: Nohlen et al., Rishikesh, sudd.ch

=== By region ===
Choice	Hills		Inner-Tarai		Mountains		Plains	
Choice	Votes	%	Votes	%	Votes	%	Votes	%
Panchayat	1,126,169	57.2	87,895	34.0	228,617	71.1	848,754	44.6
Multi-party	844,124	42.8	139,021	66.0	86,658	28.9	938,162	55.4
Invalid/blank votes	158,581	–	20,645	–	25,061	–	69,041	–
Total	2,127,615	100	278,780	100	340,338	100	2,066,753	100
Source: Rishikesh

=== By district ===
The panchayat partyless system option got a majority in 54 out of the 75 districts of Nepal. The highest percentage of pro-panchayat votes was recorded in Dolpa (96.4%), the lowest in Bhaktapur (34.4%). The highest scores for the multiparty system option were recorded in Bhaktapur (65.6%), Udaipur (65.1%), Siraha (64%) and Bardiya (62.1%). In general, the multiparty system option performed better in areas with higher literacy levels.

District					Votes			Electorate	
District	Panchayat		Multiparty		Votes			Electorate	
District	Votes	%	Votes	%	Valid	Invalid	Total	Total	Turnout
Jhapa District	72,337	57.17%	54,198	42.83%	126,535	10,721	137,256	168,184	81.61%
Ilam District	28,525	53.45%	24,841	46.55%	53,366	5,459	58,825	76,142	77.26%
Panchthar District	28,442	56.92%	21,523	43.08%	49,965	2,797	52,762	71,514	73.78%
Taplejung District	17,597	57.49%	13,012	42.51%	30,609	3,368	33,977	56,785	59.83%
Morang District	72,589	48.08%	78,382	51.92%	150,971	14,737	165,708	208,774	79.37%
Sunsari District	54,853	48.31%	58,696	51.69%	113,549	11,353	124,902	152,000	82.17%
Dhankuta District	31,496	75.42%	10,265	24.58%	41,761	2,269	44,030	61,483	71.61%
Bhojpur District	37,083	65.02%	19,951	34.98%	57,034	3,595	60,629	100,289	60.45%
Tehrathum District	18,171	62.48%	10,912	37.52%	29,083	1,696	30,779	47,390	64.95%
Sankhuwasabha District	25,560	65.37%	13,542	34.63%	39,102	3,021	42,123	68,190	61.77%
Siraha District	50,543	35.95%	90,065	64.05%	140,608	15,652	156,260	196,875	79.37%
Saptari District	71,053	50.26%	70,322	49.74%	141,375	10,189	151,564	197,303	76.82%
Udayapur District	12,393	34.88%	23,133	65.12%	35,526	3,289	38,815	68,730	56.47%
Okhaldhunga District	27,062	69.97%	11,614	30.03%	38,676	1,848	40,524	69,351	58.43%
Khotang District	46,576	74.11%	16,270	25.89%	62,846	2,276	65,122	107,064	60.83%
Solukhumbu District	20,224	75.79%	6,461	24.21%	26,685	1,522	28,207	44,816	62.94%
Sarlahi District	58,409	42.54%	78,889	57.46%	137,298	6,510	143,808	197,396	72.85%
Dhanusha District	74,796	52.56%	67,520	47.44%	142,316	16,545	158,861	207,695	76.49%
Mahottari District	70,881	54.79%	58,498	45.21%	129,379	7,509	136,888	187,552	72.99%
Sindhuli District	27,308	58.87%	19,077	41.13%	46,385	1,012	47,397	79,328	59.75%
Ramechhap District	24,930	58.73%	17,522	41.27%	42,452	2,622	45,074	86,397	52.17%
Dolakha District	27,987	70.38%	11,781	29.62%	39,768	2,164	41,932	82,912	50.57%
Dhading District	39,932	64.93%	21,572	35.07%	61,504	4,051	65,555	121,875	53.79%
Nuwakot District	40,486	76.41%	12,500	23.59%	52,986	8,886	61,872	100,679	61.45%
Rasuwa District	9,289	74.65%	3,154	25.35%	12,443	713	13,156	15,423	85.30%
Kathmandu District	68,140	44.82%	83,884	55.18%	152,024	7,956	159,980	219,968	72.73%
Lalitpur District	24,472	38.53%	39,043	61.47%	63,515	3,631	67,146	85,189	78.82%
Bhaktapur District	21,346	36.63%	36,928	63.37%	58,274	2,814	61,088	76,116	80.26%
Kavrepalanchok District	49,230	61.30%	31,084	38.70%	80,314	6,515	86,829	149,697	58.00%
Sindhupalchok District	43,269	67.53%	20,808	32.47%	64,077	4,490	68,567	119,736	57.27%
Makwanpur District	34,960	57.88%	25,443	42.12%	60,403	3,896	64,299	104,732	61.39%
Chitwan District	31,219	44.00%	39,731	56.00%	70,950	5,842	76,792	105,889	72.52%
Bara District	63,114	59.23%	43,441	40.77%	106,555	5,827	112,382	146,919	76.49%
Parsa District	63,862	67.97%	30,091	32.03%	93,953	8,343	102,296	141,841	72.12%
Rautahat District	54,389	47.84%	59,294	52.16%	113,683	6,526	120,209	168,083	71.52%
Tanahun District	24,156	38.71%	38,243	61.29%	62,399	6,384	68,783	110,052	62.50%
Gorkha District	43,567	63.95%	24,556	36.05%	68,123	4,857	72,980	114,686	63.63%
Lamjung District	24,939	51.01%	23,950	48.99%	48,889	3,708	52,597	76,892	68.40%
Kaski District	30,012	43.01%	39,769	56.99%	69,781	5,579	75,360	111,221	67.76%
Syangja District	46,205	52.42%	41,941	47.58%	88,146	8,632	96,778	148,939	64.98%
Manang District	3,043	86.06%	493	13.94%	3,536	35	3,571	3,960	90.18%
Rupandehi District	52,664	49.28%	54,204	50.72%	106,868	9,380	116,248	163,347	71.17%
Nawalparasi District	47,275	54.27%	39,842	45.73%	87,117	7,159	94,276	128,456	73.39%
Kapilvastu District	49,751	52.12%	45,700	47.88%	95,451	6,908	102,359	136,312	75.09%
Gulmi District	36,279	50.38%	35,735	49.62%	72,014	8,904	80,918	128,168	63.13%
Arghakhanchi District	21,812	51.73%	20,356	48.27%	42,168	3,001	45,169	79,900	56.53%
Palpa District	26,961	44.35%	33,831	55.65%	60,792	3,956	64,748	101,930	63.52%
Parbat District	30,831	64.53%	16,945	35.47%	47,776	2,128	49,904	80,165	62.25%
Myagdi District	21,036	65.56%	11,049	34.44%	32,085	1,149	33,234	47,755	69.59%
Mustang District	5,898	89.66%	680	10.34%	6,578	321	6,899	7,924	87.06%
Baglung District	45,059	67.68%	21,516	32.32%	66,575	5,712	72,287	113,046	63.94%
Humla District	21,518	83.99%	4,102	16.01%	25,620	1,857	27,477	34,920	78.69%
Jumla District	4,783	63.45%	2,755	36.55%	7,538	617	8,155	11,480	71.04%
Dolpa District	9,261	96.50%	336	3.50%	9,597	984	10,581	11,518	91.86%
Mugu District	12,844	84.50%	2,356	15.50%	15,200	1,222	16,422	21,357	76.89%
Kalikot District	26,211	85.30%	4,516	14.70%	30,727	4,029	34,756	44,694	77.76%
Dang District	29,173	45.25%	35,303	54.75%	64,476	6,283	70,759	113,070	62.58%
Salyan District	21,755	59.08%	15,070	40.92%	36,825	3,117	39,942	72,133	55.37%
Pyuthan District	30,245	71.56%	12,019	28.44%	42,264	2,666	44,930	77,308	58.12%
Rolpa District	28,983	70.02%	12,408	29.98%	41,391	3,599	44,990	85,147	52.84%
Rukum District	19,919	67.76%	9,478	32.24%	29,397	6,099	35,496	62,453	56.84%
Banke District	37,769	64.12%	21,138	35.88%	58,907	7,856	66,763	90,331	73.91%
Bardiya District	19,192	37.90%	31,448	62.10%	50,640	9,353	59,993	74,220	80.83%
Surkhet District	19,021	46.62%	21,777	53.38%	40,798	4,119	44,917	66,216	67.83%
Dailekh District	26,357	64.14%	14,739	35.86%	41,096	3,843	44,939	80,877	55.56%
Jajarkot District	11,805	56.65%	9,033	43.35%	20,838	7,667	28,505	46,392	61.44%
Kailali District	27,703	50.55%	27,104	49.45%	54,807	10,225	65,032	109,638	59.32%
Doti District	15,135	49.31%	15,559	50.69%	30,694	3,080	33,774	81,663	41.36%
Achham District	28,350	60.87%	18,226	39.13%	46,576	3,849	50,425	106,712	47.25%
Bajhang District	25,325	70.28%	10,707	29.72%	36,032	2,486	38,518	65,947	58.41%
Bajura District	14,416	71.58%	5,723	28.42%	20,139	1,557	21,696	37,215	58.30%
Kanchanpur District	18,382	48.74%	19,330	51.26%	37,712	4,248	41,960	72,321	58.02%
Dadeldhura District	9,235	47.28%	10,296	52.72%	19,531	2,308	21,839	45,600	47.89%
Baitadi District	18,308	54.56%	15,245	45.44%	33,553	2,287	35,840	92,377	38.80%
Darchula District	14,661	67.56%	7,040	32.44%	21,701	1,167	22,868	43,772	52.24%
Source: Election Commission

The Hindu community was more or less evenly divided between the two options. The Muslim community is said to have voted predominantly in favour of the panchayat system. Ethnic groups like Tamang, Sherpa, Magar, Gurung and Kirati overwhelmingly supported the panchayat option, whilst the Tharu are said to have been predominantly in favour of the multiparty system.
