= Pushpa Lal Shrestha =

Nepali politician

- पुष्पलाल श्रेष्ठ
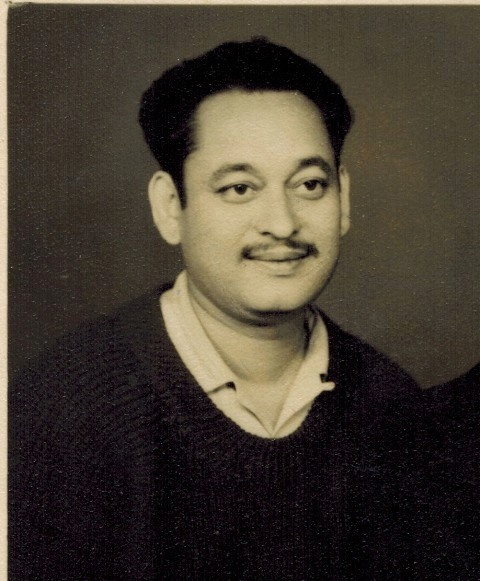

General Secretary of Communist Party of Nepal
- In office 1949–1954
- Preceded by: Position established
- Succeeded by: Man Mohan Adhikari

Personal details
- Born: 28 June 1924 Ramechhap District, Nepal
- Died: 22 July 1978 (aged 54) New Delhi, India
- Citizenship: Nepali
- Party: Communist Party of Nepal
- Other political affiliations: Nepal Praja Parishad
- Spouse: Sahana Pradhan
- Awards: Nepal Ratna (2019)

Pushpa Lal Shrestha (Nepali: पुष्पलाल श्रेष्ठ) (1924 – 22 July 1978) was a Nepali politician, considered to be the father of Nepali communism. He was the founding general secretary of the Communist Party of Nepal.

== Early life ==
Shrestha was born on 28 June 1924 in Ramechhap District, Bagmati Province, Nepal.

== Career ==
The communist movement in Nepal traces its history back to Pushpa Lal Shrestha, the father of Nepali communism and the founder and general secretary of the first Nepali communist party, the Communist Party of Nepal. Younger brother to Gangalal Shrestha, one of the four great martyrs of the Nepali democratic revolution, Pushpa Lal joined the political fight against the autocratic Rana regime at a young age, some time after Gangalal's martyrdom in early 1941. He was already known for his defiance of the Ranas by 1946. He began his political career at Nepal Praja Parishad, the party of the four martyrs. He then went on to become a prominent member of the Nepal Rastriya Congress (NRC), the sister party of Indian National Congress, which would eventually become Nepal Congress.

Disillusioned by the political infighting within the party, and the party's willingness to cooperate with some Ranas, Pushpa Lal left the party he was the office secretary of, and sought to launch an uncompromising political struggle against the Rana regime. After his meeting with the noted Indian communist leader Nripendra Chakrawarti, he settled upon founding a communist party, deeming the support of the international socialist movement an indispensable asset in the struggle for democracy. On 22 April 1949, he founded the Communist Party of Nepal along with four other colleagues, in Calcutta. He translated into Nepali the Communist manifesto and other writings of Marx, Engels, Lenin, Stalin and Mao, in addition to his own original writings on Nepali struggle for democracy and Nepal's future path.

Lal played a large role in the early years of the Communist Party. The party split in 1962. He followed the radical faction led by Tulsi Lal Amatya in forming a separate Communist Party. Its 3rd congress in 1962 declared that Tulsi Lal and Pushpa Lal would share the central leadership responsibilities. In 1968, as the Sino-Soviet split intensified, the power-sharing agreement with Tulsi Lal Amatya was failing. Pushpa left with a largely Maoist contingent to form the Communist Party of Nepal (Pushpa Lal). He remained its leader until his death in 1978. He became an inspiration for other Communists, such as Prachanda. Pushpa Lal was married to Sahana Pradhan (1927–2014), who became leader of the party from 1986.

== Pushpalal Memorial College ==
Pushpalal memorial college is a private college in Kathmandu valley. It was founded by the late Pushpalal Shrestha. Beginning with academic year 1973 – 1974, it hosted a science faculty along with programs on humanities, education and management.

== Death ==
Shrestha died on 22 July 1978 in New Delhi, India.
