= Nepal Conservative Party =

Royalist political party in Nepal

The Nepal Conservative Party is a royalist political party in Nepal. It is led by professional wrestler Bharat Bahadur Bishural (a.k.a. 'Himalayan Tiger'). The party took part in the 2006 municipal elections, which were boycotted by most major parties.
