= Communist Party of Nepal (Unity Centre) =

Communist Party of Nepal (Unity Centre) नेपाल कम्युनिष्ट पार्टी (एकता केन्द्र)
- Founded: 20 November 1990
- Dissolved: 2001
- Merger of: CPN (Mashal); CPN (Fourth Convention); PWO; CPN (Janamukhi)
- Succeeded by: CPN (Unity Centre–Masal)
- Electoral front: Samyukta Janamorcha Nepal
- Ideology: Communism; Marxism–Leninism
- Political position: Far-left

The Communist Party of Nepal (Unity Centre) was a communist party in Nepal. CPN (UC) was formed on 19–20 November 1990 through the merger of Communist Party of Nepal (Mashal), Communist Party of Nepal (Fourth Convention), Proletarian Workers Organisation, and Communist Party of Nepal (Janamukhi). Soon thereafter, a group led by Baburam Bhattarai and Shital Kumar, who had left Communist Party of Nepal (Masal), joined the party. Samyukta Janamorcha Nepal was set up as the open mass front of the party.

== History ==
In 1991, the party held its first convention. It adopted a line of "protracted armed struggle on the route to a new democratic revolution" and that the party would remain an underground party.

In 1992, in a situation of economic crisis and chaos, with spiralling prices as a result of implementation of changes in policy of the new Congress government, SJM and CPN (UC) stepped up their political agitation. A Joint People's Agitation Committee was set up together with the Communist Party of Nepal (Masal), the Nepal Communist League and the Communist Party of Nepal (Marxist–Leninist–Maoist). A general strike was called for 6 April.

Violent incidents began to occur on the evening ahead of the strike. The Joint People's Agitation Committee had called for a 30-minute lights out in the capital, and violence erupted outside Bir Hospital when activists tried to enforce the 'lights out'. At dawn on 6 April, clashes between strike activists and police outside a police station in Pulchok (Patan) left two activists dead. Later in the day, a mass rally of the Agitation Committee at Tundikhel in the capital Kathmandu was attacked by police forces. As a result, riots broke out, and the Nepal Telecommunications building was set on fire. Police opened fire at the crowd, killing several persons. The Human Rights Organisation of Nepal estimated that 14 people, including several on-lookers, had been killed in police firing.

In 1994, a group led by Baburam Bhattarai and Pushpa Kamal Dahal broke away from CPN (UC) and formed a parallel CPN-UC which took the name Communist Party of Nepal (Maoist) in 1996.

At the party convention held in Chitwan 16–18 December 2001, CPN (UC) decided to merge with Communist Party of Nepal (Masal). The merger became effective in early 2002, and the Communist Party of Nepal (Unity Centre–Masal) was formed.

== See also ==
- Communist Party of Nepal (Marxist–Leninist–Maoist Centre)
- List of communist parties in Nepal
