= Panchayat (Nepal) =

Absolute monarchy of Nepal (1960–1990)

Panchayat (Nepali: पञ्चायत) was a political system in Nepal from 1961 to 1990. It banned political parties and placed all governmental power, including power over the Council of Ministers and Federal Parliament, under the sole authority of the king; this made the country a de facto absolute monarchy.

After sidelining the Nepali Congress government of B. P. Koirala on 15 December 1960 (1 Poush 2017 BS) in a coup d'état, King Mahendra introduced the panchayat system on 5 January 1961 (22 Poush 2017 BS). Mahendra introduced a four-tier structure (village, town, district, and national) based on limited elected executive committees. The king consolidated power by institutionalizing three pillars of national identity—Hinduism, the Nepali language, and the monarchy—as foundations of everyday social and religious life. This was encapsulated in the slogan, Ek Raja, Ek Bhesh, Ek Bhasa (one king, one dress, one language).

Popular discontent with the panchayat system grew and exploded on 18 February 1990, when the banned Nepali Congress and the United Left Front (a coalition of left-wing Nepali parties) launched a campaign of popular demonstrations and strikes to end the system and restore multiparty democracy. The campaign, later known as the People's Movement, compelled King Birendra to lift the political-party ban on 8 April of that year and end the panchayat system that had dominated Nepal for almost 30 years.

== Background ==
King Mahendra invoked his emergency powers to dissolve the government in 1960, citing that the Congress government had fostered corruption, promoted parties above national interest, failed to maintain law and order, and "encouraged anti-national elements". Although the Congress leadership vowed to resist non-violently in alliance with several political parties (including former rivals such as the Gorkha Parishad and the United Democratic Party), their protests had little public reaction and the king's new government moved to modify the constitution and outlaw political parties. The Congress's leadership (including the prime minister) were imprisoned, and civil liberties and press freedom were curtailed. The Congress government continued non-violent resistance from India, with India attempting to aid democratic factions by imposing an unofficial trade blockage on Nepal; Indian involvement ended in 1962, however, with the outbreak of the Sino-Indian War.

Adopted on the second anniversary of the dissolution of the government, the new constitution of 16 December 1962 created a four-tier panchayat system. At the local level, 4,000 village assemblies (gaun sabha) elected nine village panchayat members who selected a mayor (sabhapati). Each village panchayat sent a member to sit on one of 75 district (zilla) panchayats representing 40 to 70 villages; the town panchayat chose one-third of the members of these assemblies. District panchayat members elected representatives to fourteen zone assemblies (anchal sabha), which were electoral colleges for the Rastriya Panchayat in Kathmandu. Organizations also existed at the village, district, and zone levels for peasants, youth, women, elders, laborers and ex-soldiers, who elected their representatives to assemblies. The national Rastriya Panchayat, with about 90 members, could not debate the principles of non-party democracy, introduce budget bills without royal approval, or enact bills without the king's permission. Mahendra was the supreme commander of the armed forces, appointed (and had the power to remove) members of the Supreme Court, appointed a public-service commission to oversee the civil service, and could change any judicial decision or amend the constitution at will. Within ten years, the king had reclaimed sovereign power exercised by the eighteenth-century Prithvi Narayan Shah.

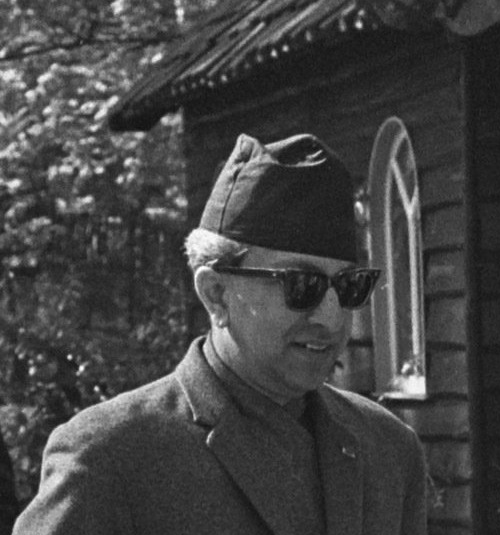
King Mahendra in 1967

The first elections to the Rastriya Panchayat were held in March and April 1963. Although political parties were banned and the major opposition parties refused to participate, about one-third of the legislature's members were associated with the Nepali Congress. Support for the king by the army and the government prevented opposition to his rule from developing within the panchayat system. The real power was exercised by the king's secretariat. In the countryside, influence was in the offices of zone commissioners and staff or the parallel system of development officers.

Founded on having a system "suitable to the soil" by King Mahendra, the panchayat polity was marked by a party-less system emphasizing decentralization, while class coordination was to be implemented "only through the active and dynamic leadership of the crown". Mahendra dismissed the first democratically-elected BP Koirala government, and the panchayat has had a lasting impact on Nepal's history. It equated nationalism with the Nepali language, Daura-Suruwal and Hinduism, aggressively campaigning to mold a Nepali identity along these lines. However, the panchayat's institutions and policies were riddled with contradictions.

== Reforms ==
Under Mahendra's direct leadership, the government implemented some significant projects initiated under the previous regime and oversaw further steps toward Nepal's development. Land reform led to the confiscation of large estates. Reforms abolished the privileges of the aristocratic elite in western Nepal. A 1963 legal code replaced the Muluki Ain of 1854, but a land-reform program launched the following year was essentially a failure. The panchayat system brought 50,000 to 60,000 people into a unified system of representative government in a way that had been impossible for the elite political parties. Nepal carried out its second (1962–65) and third Five-Year Plans (1965–70), and began the Fourth Five-Year Plan (1970–75). Eradication of malaria, construction of the east-west Mahendra Highway along the southern foothills of the Himalayas, and land-settlement programs contributed to a massive population shift from the mountains to the Terai; this significantly increased the area devoted to agriculture. By 1986, 2,054 industrial establishments employed about 125,000 workers nationwide.

== Amendment to the 1962 constitution ==
The 1967–1975 Back to the Village National Campaign was originally a rural-development effort. A 1975 amendment to the constitution made the campaign a means of maintaining political power, but it was suspended in 1979.

== End of the system ==
The authoritarian regime and its curbs on the freedom of the political parties were resented. The palace was considered unrepresentative of the masses, especially when the Marich Man Singh government faced political scandal for misappropriating funds allocated for the victims of the August 1988 earthquake or when it reshuffled the cabinet instead of investigating the deaths of people in a stampede in the national sports complex during a hailstorm. The souring of India-Nepal trade relations also affected the popularity of the Singh government.

Nepal introduced a work permit for Indian workers in three districts in April 1987. In early 1989, Nepal provided a 40-percent duty concession to Chinese goods and later withdrew duty concessions from Indian goods so Chinese goods became cheaper than their Indian counterparts. This led to increasingly strained relations over Nepal's purchase of Chinese arms in 1988. India refused to renew two treaties of trade and transit and insisted on a single treaty dealing with the two issues, which was unacceptable to Nepal. A deadlock ensued, and the treaties expired on 23 March 1989. The country's poorer classes bore the brunt of the restricted supply of consumer goods and petroleum products such as petrol, aviation fuel, and kerosene. Industry suffered because it depended on India for resources, trade, and transit. The government tried to deal with the situation by relying on foreign aid from the US, UK, Australia and China, angering those who desired negotiation with India rather than dependence on foreign aid.

The Nepali Congress (NC) and the left-wing parties blamed the government for perpetuating the crisis and not taking any serious measures to resolve it. In December 1989, the NC observed the anniversary of BP Koirala's imprisonment by launching a people's awareness program. A left-wing alliance known as the United Left Front (ULF) supported the NC in its campaign for a party system. On January 18–19, 1990, the NC held a conference to which leaders of other countries and foreign reporters were invited. Leaders from India attended the meeting; Germany, Japan, Spain, and Finland supported the movement, and the US and West German ambassadors were present. Inspired by the international support and democratic activities occurring throughout the world after the 1989 fall of the Berlin Wall, the NC and the ULF began a mass movement on 18 February of that year to end the panchayat system and install a representative interim government.

On 6 April, the Marich Man Singh government was dismissed and Lokendra Bahadur Chand became prime minister; however, the insurgents opposed the nonparty system rather than the Singh government. Violence ensued, and several people were killed in a confrontation with the army. On 16 April, the Chand government was dismissed. A royal proclamation was issued the following day which dissolved the national panchayat, the panchayat system, the evaluation committee, and the class organizations. The proclamation restored Nepal's political parties, contingent on the parties' maintaining the national interest.
