= United Left Front (Nepal, 1990) =

Alliance of communist parties

The United Left Front (Nepali: संयुक्त वाम मोर्चा, romanized: sanyukt vaam morcha) was an alliance of communist parties that opposed the autocratic regime in Nepal. It was formed in 1990 and conducted joint movement with the Nepali Congress. The uprising, called Jana Andolan (People's Movement), brought to an end of monarchic dictatorship and led the way for multiparty elections. The constituents of the United Left Front were:

- Communist Party of Nepal (Marxist-Leninist)
- Nepal Workers and Peasants Party
- Communist Party of Nepal (Fourth Convention)
- Communist Party of Nepal (Marxist)
- Communist Party of Nepal (Burma)
- Communist Party of Nepal (Manandhar)
- Communist Party of Nepal (Amatya)

The leader of the United Left Front was Sahana Pradhan of the CPN (Marxist). Following the abolition of democratic rule in 2002, five minor left parties mobilized a United Left Front (Nepal) (2002). After four of them merged into two parties in 2005, the organisation consisted of three parties.
