= 1979 Nepalese student protests =

1979 pro-democracy protests in Nepal

The 1979 student protests in Nepal (Nepali: २०३६ सालको आन्दोलन, 2036 Saal ko Aandolan) were a series of protests amongst the student community in Nepal during the months of April and May 1979 (2036 B.S.). The clashes that occurred had a significant historical impact, as they forced the monarchy to concede to holding a referendum on the possibility of a multiparty system in the country. Official figures stated that 11 persons were killed during the agitation, and 164 wounded.

== April 6 rally ==
On April 6 a group of students demonstrated in the capital Kathmandu, protesting against the execution of Zulfikar Ali Bhutto, former Prime Minister of Pakistan. As the manifestation came nearer the Pakistani embassy, the student procession was stopped by police at Lainchour. Reportedly, the police blocked the students as King Birendra's vehicle was travelling nearby. Clashes between students and riot police occurred.

== Spark of protests ==
After the violent clashes of April 6, representatives of the student community composed a list of 22 demands to the authorities, urging an end to police repression against the student movement. A series of other protests were held by students in the days to come. In an effort to quell the dissent, the authorities decided to close the campuses in Kathmandu Valley between April 13 and April 21.

On April 9 (B.S 2035 Chaitra), a nine-member central Action Committee of students was formed in order to write the 25-point chart of demands. The members of the Action Committee were as follows:

- Nepal National Student Federation: Kailash Karki, Dhruba Shrestha and Sunil Manandhar,
- Nepal Bidhyarthi Sangh: Bal Bahadur Karki, Benu Prasai and Shiva Bhurtel, and
- All Nepal National Free Students Union: Sharan Bikram Malla, Bharat Pokhrel, and Dhruba Gyanwali

Among them, 'chief action committees' consisting of three members were also formed, of Bal Bahadur K.C. of Nepal Students Union (connected to Nepali Congress), Kailash Karki of the Nepal National Students Federation (connected to the pro-Soviet Communist Party) and Sharan Bikram Malla of the All Nepal National Free Students Union (connected to the pro-Chinese communist, Pushpa lal group).

== April 23 Ascol clashes ==
On April 23 students of the Amrit Science College (Ascol) held a public manifestation, protesting against violence committed by the pro-government outfit Rashtravadi Swatantra Vidhyarthi Mandal (nicknamed mandales). At that manifestation, the police not only decided to break up the demonstration in the open areas of the campus, but surrounded the entire area and began violently assaulting the students. Sources from the student community claimed that two or three students were killed by the police. Police sources, on their hand, claimed that 64 amongst their ranks had been injured in the clashes.

Following the Amrit Science College clashes, the authorities took a decision that would essentially turn local student unrest in the capital into a national rebellion. They decided to close the campuses and student hostels; students were given 24 hours to clear their rooms. Students from remote areas left the capital to return to their family residences. To their villages and hometowns they brought news about the brutality of the state forces, and soon protests began to appear around the country.

== Nationwide Escalation ==
On April 27 a visit by a minister to Hetauda sparked protests by the local population. Demonstrators held the minister incommunicado for ten hours. The crowd was broken up by police firing. Official records say that three demonstrators were killed, but opposition sources claimed that the death toll could have reached 17. The morning after, the state forces clamped down on known opposition leaders in the capital, arresting several prominent figures. Former Prime Minister B.P. Koirala was placed under house arrest.

The unrest then gained momentum and spread throughout the country. Protests occurred in Bhaktapur, Patan, Bharatpur, Birganj, Kalaiya, Janakpur, Biratnagar, Rajbiraj, Siraha, Sarlahi, Pokhara and Syangja. In total, clashes occurred in 37 out of 75 districts of Nepal. The education minister, Pashupati Shamsher Rana, resigned.

== Royal commission and negotiations ==
On May 2 King Birendra, in response to the protests, formed a five-member commission headed by Dhanendra Bahadur Singh, Chief Justice of Supreme Court, present a report on how to deal with student movement. On May 2–3, 160 students arrested during the protests were released. The royal commission suggested giving in to the students' demands concerning academic issues, and on May 9 the 64 remaining arrested students were released alongside political opposition leaders.

The Central Student Action Committee, Bal Bahadur K.C.-Nepal Biddhyarthi Sangh, Sharan Bikram Malla- All Nepal Free Student Union, Kailash Karki- National Student Federation were the three members of central action committee of the students movement of 1979 was able to reach an agreement with the royal commission including abolishing the 1972 new education policy, scrapping entrance exams for universities, giving the right to form independent unions and abolishing the Mandales. The Student Action Committee on their behalf urged fellow students to return to the campuses.

== Royal declaration on plebiscite ==
On May 23 King Birendra made a public declaration that a referendum with universal adult suffrage with secret vote would be held in which the people of Nepal would be able to choose between introducing a multiparty system or retain the non-party panchayat regime. The referendum was held on May 2, 1980.
