= Tulsi Lal Amatya =

Nepalese politician

- तुलसीलाल अमात्य
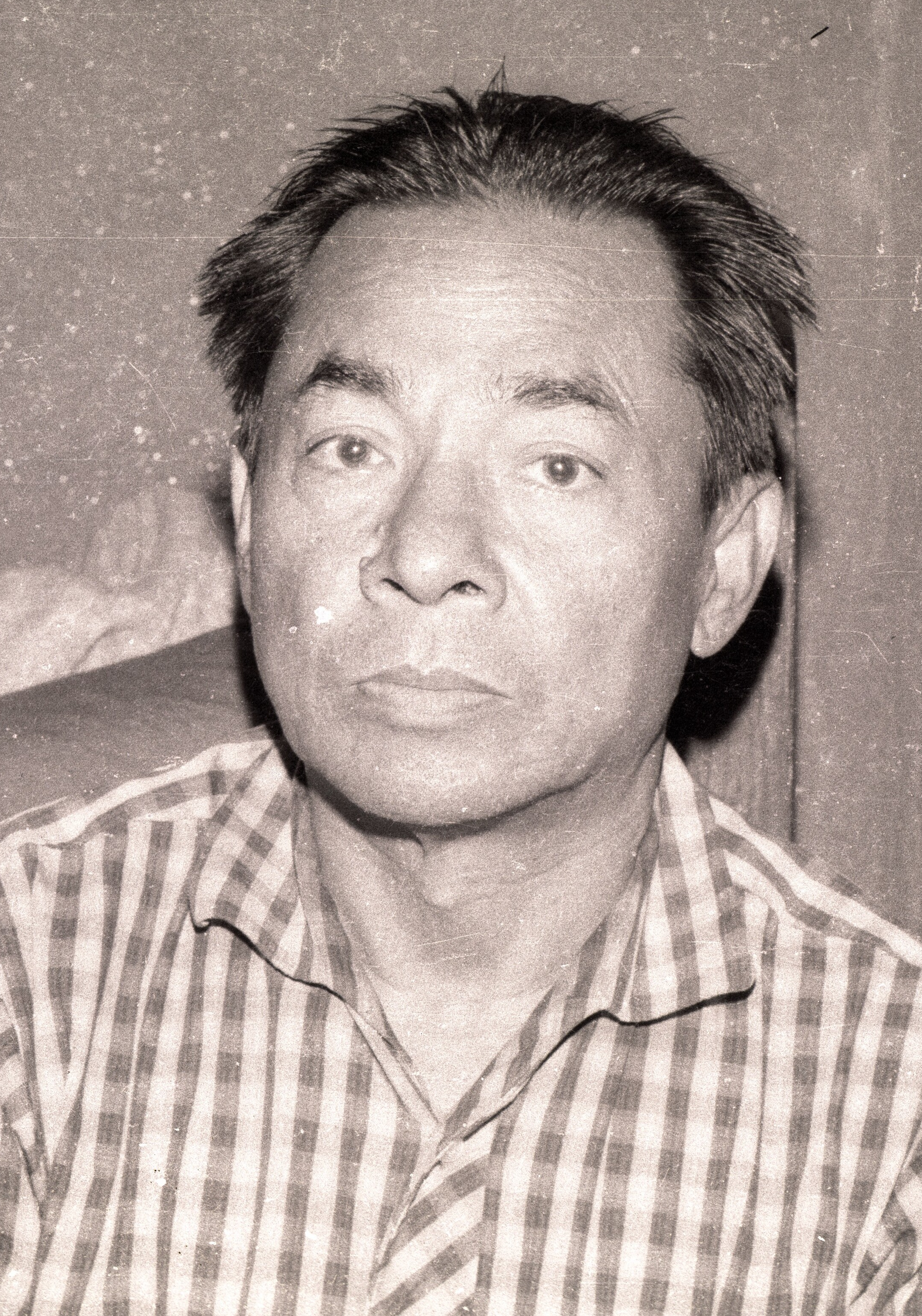
- Tulsi Lal Amatya in 1981

General secretary of Communist Party of Nepal
- In office 1962–1962
- Preceded by: Keshar Jung Rayamajhi
- Succeeded by: Position abolished

Personal details
- Born: 1916 Lalitpur, Nepal
- Died: 1997 (aged 80–81)
- Party: Communist Party of Nepal; Communist Party of Nepal (Amatya)

Tulsi Lal Amatya (Nepali: तुलसीलाल अमात्य; May 1916 – August 1997) was a Nepalese politician.

== Biography ==
Amatya was born in May 1916 in Lalitpur, Nepal to Riddhinarsimha Malla Amatya and Yog Maya Awnatya (Spelling error, though not sure Amatya? ) .

In 1962, he served as the general secretary of the Communist Party of Nepal. The same year, the Communist Party of Nepal was split into two parties, the Communist Party of Nepal (Amatya), and the Communist Party of Nepal (Burma). Amatya also served as the Ambassador of Nepal to China from 1995 to 1996.

Tulsi Lal Amatya died in August 1997. In 2001, the Government of Nepal issued a stamp featuring Amatya.

== Awards ==
- Maha Ujwaol Rastradeep awards from the President of Nepal on 2021 (posthumously)
