= Communist Party of Nepal (Masal) (1999) =

The Communist Party of Nepal (Masal) (1999) was a communist party in Nepal led by Deena Nath Sharma. It was formed on April 6, 1999, by activists splitting away from the Communist Party of Nepal (Masal). Sharma's faction called for the boycott of elections and urged its followers to support the armed struggle being led by the Communist Party of Nepal (Maoist). In 2000 the party merged with the CPN(Maoist). Sharma becoming a member of the CPN(Maoist) politburo.

== See also ==
- List of communist parties in Nepal
