= Communist Party of Nepal =

Communist Party of Nepal नेपाल कम्युनिस्ट पार्टी
- General Secretary: Tulsi Lal Amatya
- Founder: Pushpa Lal Shrestha
- Founded: 15 September 1949; 76 years ago
- Dissolved: 1962; 64 years ago
- Succeeded by: Communist Party of Nepal (Amatya); Communist Party of Nepal (Rayamajhi)
- Ideology: Communism; Marxism–Leninism

Election symbol

The Communist Party of Nepal (Nepali: नेपाल कम्युनिस्ट पार्टी), abbreviated CPN, was a communist party in Nepal from 1949 to 1962. It was founded on 15 September 1949 to struggle against the autocratic Rana regime, feudalism, and imperialism. The founding general secretary was Pushpa Lal Shrestha. The founding members of the Communist Party of Nepal were Moti Devi Shrestha, Niranjan Govinda Vaidya, Nar Bahadur Karmacharya and Narayan Bilas Joshi.

== History ==
=== Formation and early years, 1949–1951 ===
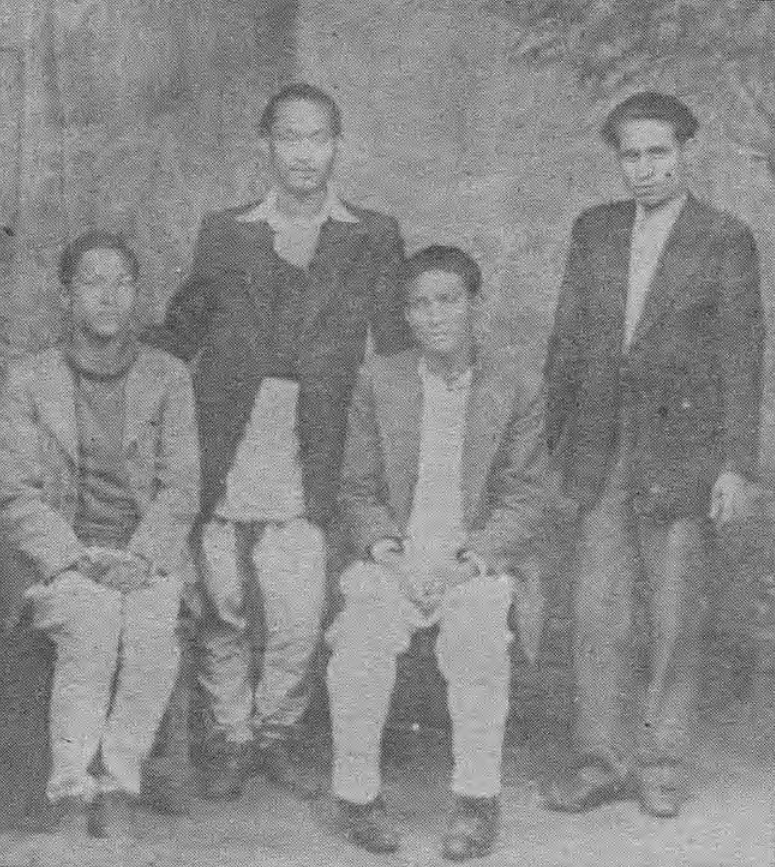
Founding members Nirajan Govinda Vaidya, Pushpalal Shrestha, Nar Bahadur Karmacharya, Narayan Bilas Joshi

The party was formed by Pushpa Lal Shrestha, a former member of the Nepali National Congress, who had grown disillusioned with the infighting in the party and the willingness to cooperate and make concessions with the Ranas. After his resignation from the Nepali National Congress–which would later become the Nepali Congress–he had been inspired by Marxist literary criticism and in April 1949 published a translated version of The Communist Manifesto in the Nepali language. There were initial plans to work within the Nepali National Congress as a leftist group or organize as a workers-peasants party but this was eventually scrapped.

Shrestha who was in Kolkata at the time joined the Marxist Study Circle in Campbell Medical School. Keshar Jung Rayamajhi who was studying at Campbell and Man Mohan Adhikari who was studying in Benaras at the time were also members of the group. On 22 April 1949, Pushpa Lal became the secretary of an organizing committee which was to become the Communist Party of Nepal. The members of the organizing committee at the time were Moti Devi Shrestha, Niranjan Govinda Vaidya, Nar Bahadur Karmacharya and Narayan Bilas Joshi.

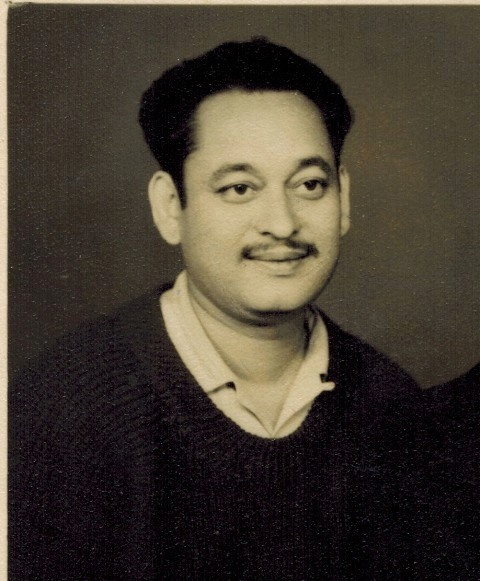
Pushpa Lal Shrestha, founding General Secretary of CPN

The Central Organising Committee of the CPN published the first issue of the Communist Pachhik Prachar Patra on 15 September 1949 as the manifesto of the CPN. The date was symbolic as exactly one hundred and three years ago Jang Bahadur Rana had started the Rana regime in Nepal after orchestrating the Kot massacre. The first central committee of the CPN did not include any other members of the original organizing committee except for Shrestha. The members of the first central committee were Man Mohan Adhikari, Tulsi Lal Amatya, Shailendra Kumar Upadhyaya, D.P. Adhikari and Communist Party of India member Ayodhya Singh.

The CPN played an important role in the 1951 uprising that overthrew the Rana regime. The party was one of the constituents of the United Democratic Front along with smaller communist and leftist groups. The UDF organized civil disobedience movements and also demanded the release of political prisoners.

=== Ban, 1952–1954 ===
On 8 June 1952, the Kisan Sangh (Farmer's Union), the farmers-wing of the CPN, declared a revolt against landlords and demanded that land be distributed to landless peasants. Earlier in the year in January, a coup was attempted by the Rakshya Dal under the leadership of Kunwar Inderjit Singh. The party had occupied the airfield, radio station, the post and the telegraph office at Singha Durbar. They had demanded that an all-party government be formed that included the Communists but excluded the far-right Nepal Rashtrabadi Gorkha Parishad. The military intervened and Singh was arrested. As a consequence of this event, the CPN was banned on 24 January 1952.

The party contested the 1953 Kathmandu municipal election as independents and won half of the votes and six seats to the nineteen-member council. Janak Man Singh from the party was elected as the first elected mayor of Kathmandu. In the end of 1955, the party organized the Rastriya Janamorcha (National People's Front) under the leadership of general secretary Keshar Jung Rayamajhi.

=== First general convention, 1954–1958 ===
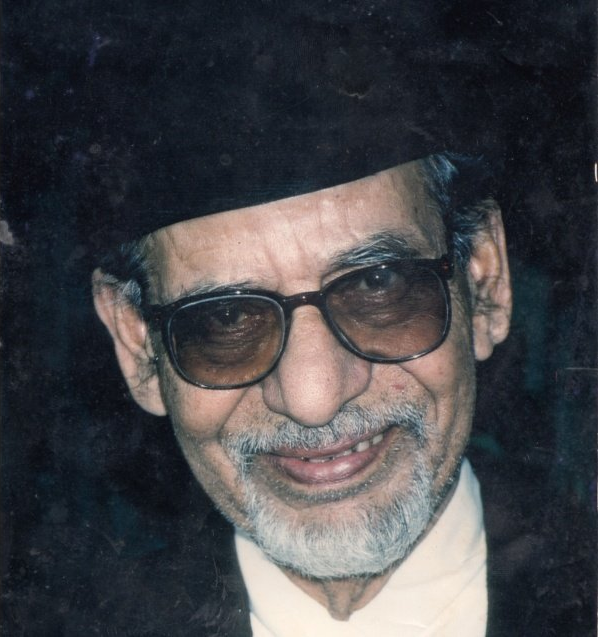
Man Mohan Adhikari, General Secretary of CPN 1954 to 1957

In 1954, the first party congress was held clandestinely in Patan, Lalitpur. Man Mohan Adhikari was elected as the party's general secretary, the party also approved a programme to replace monarchism with a republican system framed by an elected constituent assembly.

In 1956, when the Tanka Prasad Acharya-led government became an ally of the Communist Party of Nepal, the party had to accept constitutional monarchy as a condition to lift the ban on the party. In April 1956, the ban on the party was lifted. The party was also considered to be relatively tamed at this point as the leadership had displayed a level of deference towards the monarchy that most communist movements did not. In 1957, the second party congress was held in Kathmandu. For the first time, the party could hold its congress openly, and Keshar Jung Rayamajhi was elected general secretary.

=== First elections and royal coup, 1959–1961 ===
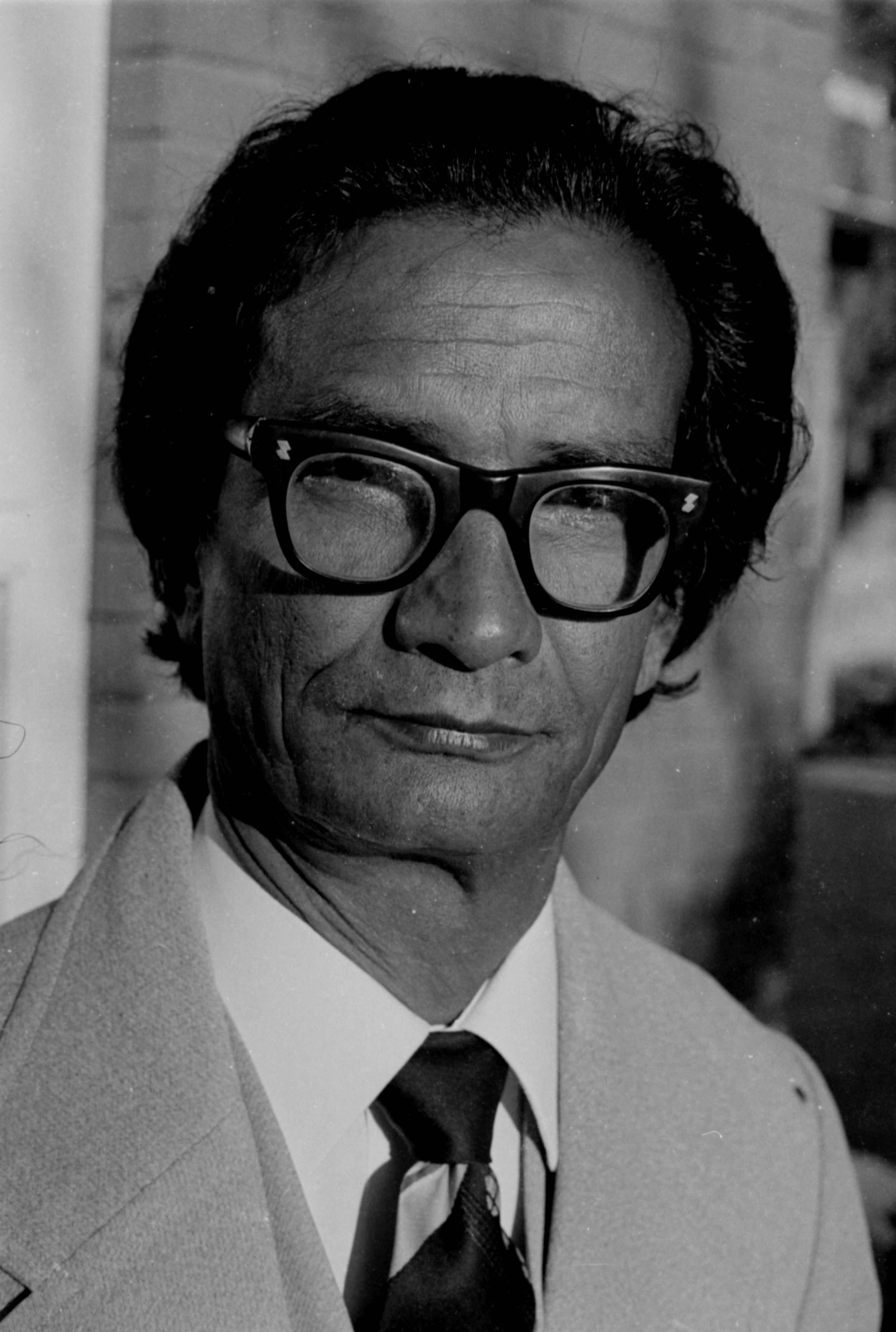
Keshar Jung Rayamajhi, General Secretary of CPN from 1957 to 1962

The party contested the 1959 Nepalese general election and won four seats to the first House of Representative. Tulsi Lal Amatya was elected as the party's parliamentary party leader in the House of Representatives. CPN also had one member in the Senate (the upper house at the time) when Sambhu Ram Shrestha was elected in 1959. When King Mahendra took power and started his own direct rule, two major blocks developed in the party. The block led by Keshar Jung Rayamajhi supported the royal coup and the other block led by Tulsi Lal Amatya called for a united struggle against the coup. Rayamajhi's position prompted Ajoy Ghosh, leader of the Communist Party of India to advice Rayamjhi to rectify his positions and retain the struggle against the monarchy. In early 1961, all political parties were banned. A wave of repression against CPN was initiated by the government. Rayamajhi had expressed certain faith in the politics of the monarch, something that provoked stern reaction from other sectors of the party.

To resolve the conflict a central plenum was convened in Darbhanga, India as all political gatherings in Nepal had been banned by royal decree. The plenum unanimously passed the line of armed struggle that was proposed by Pushpa Lal. Three lines had now emerged in the party, that of a pro-constitutional monarchy line led by Rayamajhi, a line that wanted to restore the dissolved parliament and launch broad mass movements led by Pushpa Lal, and a third line which favoured a constitutional assembly led by Mohan Bikram Singh. The latter line emerged victorious, but its sole representative in the Central Committee was Singh.

=== Split and dissolution, 1962 ===
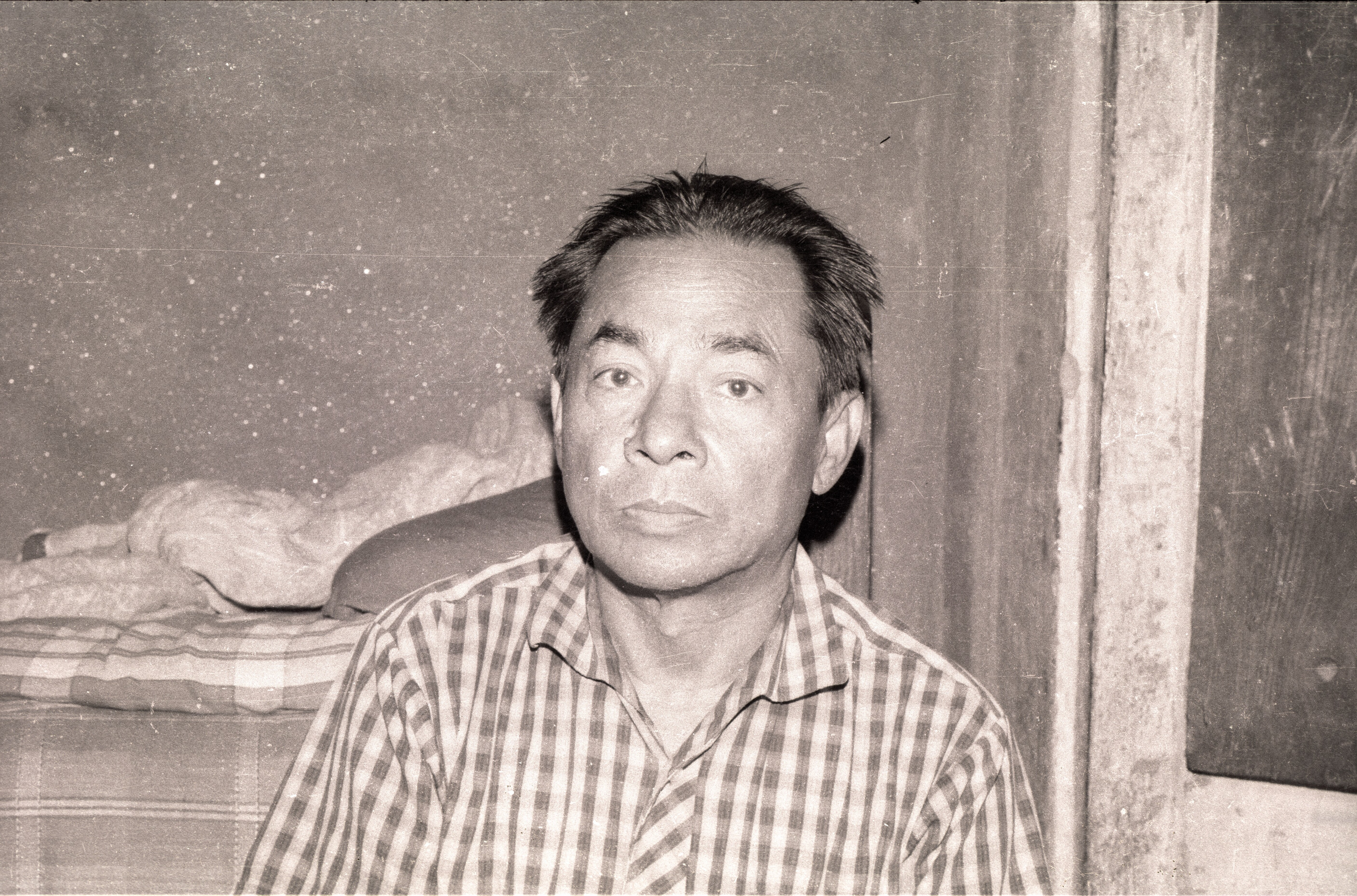
Tulsi Lal Amatya, General Secretary of CPN in 1962

In April 1962, one section of the party convened the third party congress in Varanasi, India. The congress approved the programme of National Democratic Revolution proposed by Tulsi Lal Amatya. Amatya was also elected as the general secretary. Pushpa Lal was in the capital at the time of the congress but had supported the decision. The congress also decided to expel Rayamajhi who supported the monarchy, but the faction led by Rayamajhi, who controlled the Central Committee, did not recognize this congress as legitimate. The party then split into the Communist Party of Nepal (Amatya) and Communist Party of Nepal (Rayamjhi).

== Ideology ==
The main objective of the Communist Party of Nepal in the 1950s was to transform Nepal into a republic, later on during the decade the party adopted Leninist principles of class struggle against the urban centered and the elite oriented. The party was also critical of the Nepali Congress, which was considered close to the ruling Indian National Congress. The party had opposed what it called cultural imperialism of India.

== Electoral performance ==
Election	Leader	Votes		Seats	Position	Resulting government
Election	Leader	No.	%	No.	Position	Resulting government
1959	Keshar Jung Rayamajhi	129,142	7.2	4 / 109	4th	In opposition

== Leadership ==
=== General Secretaries ===
- Pushpa Lal Shrestha, 1949–1954
- Man Mohan Adhikari, 1954–1957
- Keshar Jung Rayamajhi, 1957–1962
- Tulsi Lal Amatya, 1962

== See also ==
- List of communist parties in Nepal
