= 1990 Nepalese revolution =

Restoration of democracy in Nepal

1990 People's Movement
- Part of Nepalese democracy movement
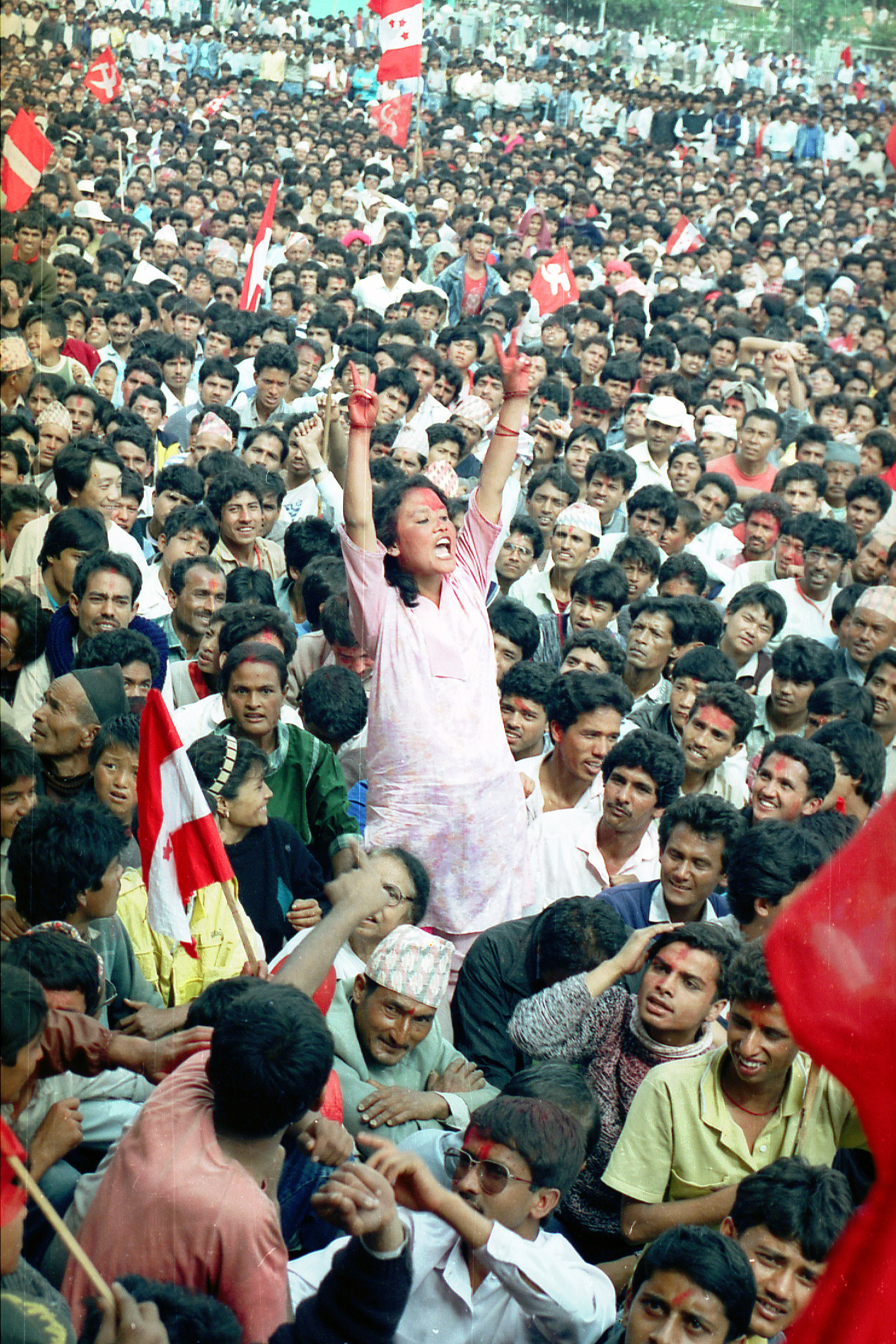
- In Min Ratna Bajracharya's famous image from the April 1990 victory rally, student activist Durga Thapa leaps up in a double victory salute
- Date: 18 February 1990 – 8 April 1990
- Location: Nepal
- Goals: Restoration of multi-party democracy
- Result: Restoration of democracy; Abolition of the Panchayat system; Nepal transitions from an absolute monarchy to a constitutional monarchy

Parties
King Birendra; Royal Nepalese Army; (Kingdom of Nepal) Government of Nepal	Nepali Congress; United Left Front

The 1990 People's Movement (Nepali: २०४६ जनआन्दोलन, romanized: 2046 Jana Andolan) was a multiparty movement in Nepal that brought an end to absolute monarchy and the beginning of constitutional monarchy. It also eliminated the Panchayat system.

The movement was marked by the unity between the various political parties. Not only did various Communist parties group together in the United Left Front (ULF), but they also cooperated with parties such as Nepali Congress (NC). One result of this unity was the formation of the Communist Party of Nepal (Unified Marxist-Leninist).

== Background ==
Nepal had undergone a civil uprising in 1950-51, resulting in the establishment of a parliamentary democracy under a constitutional rather an absolute monarchy. However, the period of parliamentary rule soon ended following a 1960 coup led by King Mahendra that led to the banning of political parties, and executive power over the cabinet and parliament being effectively placed in the power of the monarch. This political regime, known as the Panchayat system, persisted throughout his ruling.

In 1972, King Birendra, the son of King Mahendra, assumed the throne as an absolute monarch, inheriting significant power. Throughout his reign, prominent members of the Nepali Congress were frequently subjected to arrests in efforts to maintain his authority. However, by the 1980s, there was a gradual relaxation of political constraints, leading to the emergence of liberal student movements advocating for constitutional reforms in Nepal.

In response to the escalating pro-democracy sentiments, King Birendra announced a referendum to determine the future political system of the country. The options presented to the public were between a multi-party democracy and the existing party-less Panchayati system. The referendum took place in May 1980, resulting in a loss for the multi-party system, with 45% of the votes in favor, as opposed to 55% for the continuation of the party-less system.

== History ==
In 1989, two groups, the Nepali Congress, a pro-communist group and the largest illegal political party in the country, and the United Left Front, a coalition of communist and leftist parties, joined to launch a campaign to achieve a multiparty democracy in Nepal. The Jana Andolan' (People's Movement) officially started on 18 February 1990(BS २०४६ फागुन ०७) which is Democracy day in Nepal and officially ended after 49 long days. In order to stall the movement, the government arrested national and district-level leaders of both the NC and the ULF on 17 February 1990, and banned all opposition newspapers.

The king called on the nation in a radio address to stand unified with the monarchy and to pursue democratic reforms through constitutional channels. In late February, police fired on a demonstration in Bhaktapur, killing 12 people. The movement became increasingly large and dangerous as thousands of students marched against riot police and hundreds were arrested and injured. The movement called for bandhs (a kind of general strike) that quickly spread across the country.

Communication between opposition members faltered and palace leadership was at times absent, leaving local governments to deal with the protests as they saw fit. Some even joined the movement in absence of central government. These protests escalated from the countryside until they reached the capital, Kathmandu. After the army killed protesters in Patan in early April, the movement gathered some 200,000 people who marched in protest of the monarchy in the capital.

Over the course of several days, police shot and killed dozens as protesters blocked streets, taunted police officers and paraded flags demanding a restoration of the multiparty democracy system that the country had in the 1950s. At the climax of the protests, people surrounded government buildings, urging the king to accept their demands. By that point, many police did not engage with protesters but looked on as some protesters smashed government property, such as the prime minister's car and a statue of King Mahendra, as a result of which the leaders called off the protests. On 8 April 1990, the king removed the ban on political parties.

The 1990s People's Movement drafted the constitution into effect in November 1990. This constitution forced the monarchy of King Birendra Bir Bikram Shah Dev to hand over decisions of government to the Nepali people. Through rallies and protest, King Birendra was convinced to enforce a new constitution of the people, and "identifies the people as the source of political legitimacy . . . and guarantees of basic rights". Now Nepalese citizens 18 years of age and up are eligible to vote. Due to the high illiteracy rates, nearly 40% of the population, political parties are related or associated with symbols. For instance, the Tree represents the Nepali Congress Party, and the Sun represents the Unified Marxist-Leninist Party.

The construction of the constitution faced many difficulties because of the chasm between elites and the typical voter. The leaders of the most prominent parties are typically upper class citizens who are rarely concerned or associate with the larger section of the Nepal population, in which the typical voter had a high probability of being illiterate and high ethnic attachment. This large disparity increased the difficulty of creating a usable system that allowed electoral officials and Nepali citizens to create a new system, yet still embrace traditions and beliefs about caste.
