= Man Mohan Adhikari =

Prime minister of Nepal (1920–1999)

Manmohan Adhikari
- मनमोहन अधिकारी
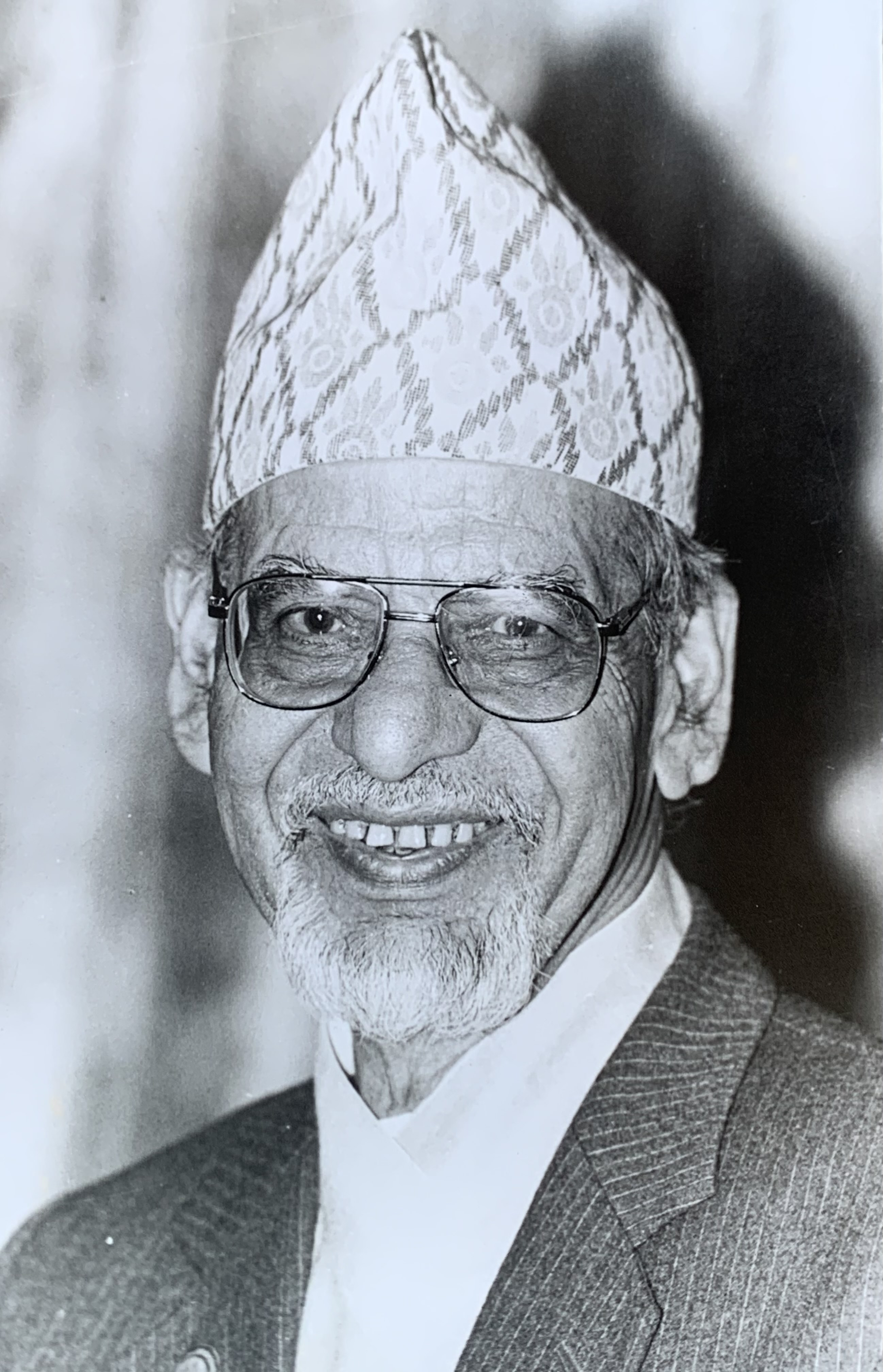
- Adhikari in 1996

Prime Minister of Nepal
- In office 30 November 1994 – 12 September 1995
- Monarch: Birendra
- Preceded by: Girija Prasad Koirala
- Succeeded by: Sher Bahadur Deuba

Leader of the Opposition
- In office 7 October 1997 – 23 December 1998
- Prime Minister: Surya Bahadur Thapa; Girija Prasad Koirala
- Preceded by: Girija Prasad Koirala
- Succeeded by: Bam Dev Gautam
- In office 12 September 1995 – 12 March 1997
- Prime Minister: Sher Bahadur Deuba
- Preceded by: Sher Bahadur Deuba
- Succeeded by: Girija Prasad Koirala
- In office 26 May 1991 – 30 November 1994
- Prime Minister: Girija Prasad Koirala
- Preceded by: Bharat Shumsher JBR (1960)
- Succeeded by: Sher Bahadur Deuba

Chairman of CPN (UML)
- In office 6 January 1991 – 26 April 1999
- Preceded by: Party founded
- Succeeded by: Jhala Nath Khanal (2009) (Note: Madhav Kumar Nepal succeeded Adhikari as leader of CPN (UML) as General Secretary.)

Member of the House of Representatives
- In office 14 December 1994 – 15 January 1999
- Preceded by: Padma Ratna Tuladhar
- Succeeded by: Ishwar Pokhrel
- Constituency: Kathmandu 3
- In office 20 June 1991 – 11 July 1994
- Preceded by: Constituency created
- Succeeded by: Lila Shrestha Subba
- Constituency: Sunsari 1

Personal details
- Born: 9 June 1920 Lazimpat, Kathmandu
- Died: 26 April 1999 (aged 78) Kathmandu, Nepal
- Party: CPN (UML)
- Relatives: Bharat Mohan Adhikari (brother); Girija Prasad Koirala and B. P. Koirala (first cousins)

Man Mohan Adhikari (Magi) (Nepali: मन मोहन अधिकारी; 9 June 1920 – 26 April 1999) was the 31st Prime Minister of Nepal from 1994 to 1995, representing the Communist Party of Nepal (Unified Marxist-Leninist). He was the first communist Prime Minister in Nepal and one of the first communist politicians in the world to be democratically elected as a head of government.

== Family and early life ==
Born in Lazimpat, Kathmandu, Nepal, he spent his childhood in Biratnagar. He hailed from a landowner, Brahmin family from Eastern Nepal. He was sent to Varanasi to study in 1938. While studying for his B.Sc. in 1942, Adhikari took part in the Quit India movement and was arrested by the British colonial authorities and jailed along with other politicians.

== Life ==
During his stay in India, Adhikari became involved in the communist movement, joining the Communist Party of India. He returned to Biratnagar and worked in the chemical industry where, in March 1947, he took part in the Biratnagar jute mill strike and was arrested and taken to Kathmandu via land route along with Girija Prasad Koirala and Bishweshwar Prasad Koirala.

He took part in the founding of the Communist Party of Nepal in 1949. In 1957/58 Man Mohan Adhikari participated in the first democratically held Parliamentary Elections in Nepal only halfheartedly, since he was keen on broadening his organization, while he had already become a key figure in the Communist Movement in the country. In 1959, the then elected government, led by Prime Minister B.P. Koirala was sacked and the elected Parliament was dissolved by King Mahendra Bir Bikram Shah Deva citing several reasons. Man Mohan, who was then in his home town of Biratnagar, Morang was arrested and lodged in jail by Koshi Zonal Commissioner Damodar Shumshere JB Rana. While he was in custody, the then democratically elected leader of Dharan Municipality Yagya Prasad Acharya, Secretary of the then Nepal Communist Party Sunsari District Committee was entrusted by Man Mohan Adhikari to negotiate with the government authority for the release of communist leaders and cadres from detention in Sunsari and Morang districts. Acharya had several rounds of parleys with communist leaders Mohan Adhikari, Shailendra Kumar Upadhyaya, Radha Prasad Ghimire and others inside the jail and Zonal Commissioner Rana and Chief Administrator of Morang District Jeevan Lal Satyal. Adhikari, was a democratic persona, so he was of the opinion that all leaders and cadres who were democratically elected in public positions such as municipal councils, should continue their jobs for maintaining continued contacts with their constituencies, instead of playing an opposition role and going to jail. This policy of Man Mohan was a key move for the re-invigoration and expansion of the communist party in Eastern Nepal.

As per the instruction of leader Adhikari, a public statement pledging support to the Constructive Leadership of the King was issued and several leaders of the then Nepal Communist Party under custody in Sunsari and Morang districts were freed. After release from the jail Shailendra Kumar Upadhyaya and Radha Parsad Ghimire (who was released after few months), Shailendra was given an audience by the King in Kathmandu, and entrusted an assignment to galvanize support for the political action taken by the King recently, who later was made the Assistant Home Affairs Minister of the country by King Mahendra.

During the Bangladesh Liberation War, Adhikari asserted that the war was an Indian aggression against Pakistan.

In November 1994, elections were held following a dissolution of parliament. Despite Congress securing a higher popular vote than the UML, the latter secured 88 seats to the former's 83. Neither party was successful in forming a coalition to hold a majority of the 205 seats. After failed coalition negotiations, however, Adhikari became Prime Minister of a minority government, acquiring the support of the National Democratic Party and the Sadbhavana Party.

In June 1995, the National Democratic Party and the Sadbhavana Party (who helped the UML form a minority government in November 1994) supported the Nepali Congress's call for a vote of no-confidence in Adhikari's government in a special session of the House of Representatives. Adhikari attempted to dissolve parliament and call elections in an attempt to replicate the circumstances under which he assumed office in 1994. But a Supreme Court challenge led by Congress saw this move deemed unconstitutional and the parliament was restored. The vote of no-confidence proceeded successfully. Elections in 1995 saw Adhikari's government voted out of office.

Adhikari was one of the few democratically elected communist party members in the world to serve as head of the government.

== Health and death ==
Adhikari suffered from asthma for four decades and went to China for four years to seek treatment after contracting tuberculosis.

On 19 April 1999, he suffered a heart attack during an election rally in the village of Gothatar and fell into a coma. He was declared brain dead on 22 April with no hope of recovery. He died four days later. He had wife and two children.

== Notes ==
Political offices
Preceded by Girija Prasad Koirala	Prime Minister of Nepal; 1994 – 1995	Succeeded by Sher Bahadur Deuba
