= Timeline of Nepalese politics =

This is a chronological timeline of events that are centered around the politics of Nepal after its unification by Prithvi Narayan Shah.

== After unification: 1769–1846 ==
Date in A.D.	Date in B.S.	Event
1769	1826	Kathmandu is declared the capital of Nepal with Prithvi Narayan Shah as the ruler of the unified country.
1775	1831	Prithvi Narayan Shah dies; his son Pratap Singh Shah is crowned king.
1777	1834	Pratap Singh Shah dies; Rana Bahadur Shah is crowned king.
1799	1855	Rana Bahadur Shah abdicates the throne; Girvan Yuddha Bikram Shah is crowned king.
1806	1862–1863	Bhimsen Thapa becomes the Mukhtiyar (Prime Minister) after he leads the 1806 Bhandarkhal massacre.; Rana Bahadur Shah is beheaded by his half-brother, Sher Bahadur Shah.
1816	1873	Girvan Yuddha Bikram Shah dies; Rajendra Bikram Shah is crowned king.
1839	1896	Bhimsen Thapa commits suicide due to the news of his wife forced to roam around the city naked are circulated by his enemies.
1846	1902	Kot massacre results in the killing of more than 40 members of the palace and starts the autocratic Rana dynasty in Nepal with Jung Bahadur Rana as its first prime minister.

== Rana regime: 1846–1951 ==
Date in A.D.	Date in B.S.	Event
1846	1903	1846 Bhandarkhal massacre occurs led by Jung Bahadur Rana.
1847	1904	King Rajendra is forced by Jung Bahadur Rana to abdicate the throne in favor of his son and heir Surendra Bikram Shah.
1854	1910	Jung Bahadur Rana introduces the Muluki Ain.
1877	1933	Prime minister Jung Bahadur Rana dies; Ranodip Singh Kunwar becomes the prime minister.
1881	1937	Rajendra Bikram Shah dies at the age of 67; King Surendra also dies at the age of 51 making Prithvi Bir Bikram Shah the king.
1885	1941	Prime minister Ranodip Singh Kunwar is assassinated by his nephews; Bir Shumsher becomes the prime minister.
5 March 1901	23 Falgun 1957	Prime minister Bir Shumsher dies; Dev Shumsher becomes the prime minister.
27 June 1901	14 Ashad 1958	Prime minister Dev Shumsher is deposed by his relatives; Chandra Shumsher becomes the prime minister.
11 December 1911	26 Mangshir 1968	King Prithvi Bir Bikram Shah dies; Tribhuvan is crowned king.
26 November 1929	11 Mangshir 1986	Prime minister Chandra Shumsher dies; Bhim Shumsher becomes the prime minister.
1 September 1932	17 Bhadra 1989	Prime minister Bhim Shumsher dies; Juddha Shumsher becomes the prime minister.
2 June 1936	20 Jestha 1993	Nepal's first political party, Nepal Praja Parishad is founded (led by Tanka Prasad Acharya).
29 November 1945	14 Mangshir 2002	Padma Shumsher becomes the prime minister.
25 January 1946	12 Magh 2002	Nepali National Congress is formed (led by BP Koirala, Matrika Prasad Koirala, Ganesh Man Singh, etc.).
30 April 1948	18 Baisakh 2005	Mohan Shumsher becomes the prime minister.
4 August 1948	20 Shrawan 2005	Nepal Democratic Congress is formed (led by Subarna Shamsher Rana, Surya Prasad Upadhyaya, etc).
9 April 1950	6 Chaitra 2006	Nepali National Congress and Nepal Democratic Congress merge forming the Nepali Congress.
7 November 1950	22 Kartik 2007	King Tribhuvan goes into exile; Gyanendra is crowned king in the absence of Tribhuvan of Nepal.
7 January 1951	23 Poush 2007	Tribhuvan returns from exile and reclaims the title of King putting an end to the autocratic Rana dynasty.

== Transitional phase: 1951–1960 ==
Date in A.D.	Date in B.S.	Event
16 November 1951	1 Mangshir 2008	Matrika Prasad Koirala becomes the first commoner to be elected a prime minister.
20 November 1952	5 Mangshir 2009	Former prime minister Juddha Shumsher dies.
15 March 1955	1 Chaitra 2011	King Tribhuvan dies; Mahendra is crowned king.
27 May 1959	13 Jestha 2016	BP Koirala becomes the first democratically elected prime minister.
15 December 1960	1 Poush 2017	King Mahendra leads a coup d'état dismissing the cabinet of B.P. Koirala and introduces the Panchayat, a partyless political system.

== Panchayat system: 1960–1990 ==
Date in A.D.	Date in B.S.	Event
31 January 1972	17 Magh 2028	King Mahendra dies; Birendra is crowned king.
26 December 1978	11 Poush 2035	CPN (Marxist–Leninist) forms which includes leaders like Madan Bhandari, KP Sharma Oli, Madhav Kumar Nepal, etc.
2 May 1980	20 Baisakh 2037	In the 1980 Nepalese governmental system referendum, the people vote in favor of the Panchayat system against a multi-party system. The Panchayat system receives a total of 2.4 million votes, while the multi-party system receives 2 million votes.
9 May 1981	27 Baisakh 2038	The first general election is held to elect the members of the Rastriya Panchayat. Since political parties were banned at the time, the main parties (Nepali Congress, and other communist parties) boycotted the election
21 July 1982	6 Shrawan 2039	Nepali Congress leader BP Koirala dies. An estimated half a million people attend his funeral.
12 May 1986	29 Baisakh 2043	Second general election is held to elect the members of the Rastriya Panchayat.
1987	2043	CPN (Marxist) forms through the merger of the CPN (Manmohan) led by Man Mohan Adhikari and the CPN (Pushpa Lal) led by Sahana Pradhan.
1990	2046	An alliance of communist parties called United Left Front is formed to protest against the absolute monarchy and the Panchayat system.
18 February 1990	7 Falgun 2046	1990 Nepalese revolution commences. Almost all of the political parties cooperate with each other in this revolution.
8 April 1990	26 Chaitra 2046	King Birendra lifts the ban on political parties.
10 September 1990	25 Bhadra 2047	Independent Constitution Recommendation Commission, which was appointed by King Birendra to represent the opposition faction, presents him with a draft of the proposed constitution.
9 November 1990	23 Kartik 2047	The interim cabinet of Krishna Prasad Bhattarai approves the draft constitution. King Birendra promulgates the new constitution transforming Nepal into a constitutional monarchy.

== Constitutional monarchy: 1990–2008 ==
Date in A.D.	Date in B.S.	Event
6 January 1991	22 Poush 2047	Two constituents of the United Left Front, CPN (Marxist) and CPN (Marxist–Leninist) merge on 6 January 1991 to form the CPN (Unified Marxist–Leninist) rendering the ULF inactive.
12 May 1991	29 Baisakh 2048	First multi-party election is held. Nepali Congress wins a majority of 110 seats although the interim prime minister Krishna Prasad Bhattarai loses by a narrow margin. The communist parties gather a total of 82 seats.
29 May 1991	15 Jestha 2048	Girija Prasad Koirala becomes the prime minister.
6 May 1993	24 Baisakh 2050	Madan Bhandari dies in an accident at Dasdhunga, Chitwan. An investigation led by KP Oli deemed it to be an unsolved mystery.
11 July 1994	27 Ashad 2051	Division within the Nepali Congress results in Girija Prasad Koirala losing the support of 36 congress members in a parliamentary vote. He resigns and King Birendra dismisses the cabinet announcing a new election.
15 November 1994	29 Kartik 2051	Second multi-party election is held. CPN (Unified Marxist–Leninist) led by Man Mohan Adhikari wins the election with 88 votes. Nepali Congress led by Girija Prasad Koirala wins 83 votes. Rastriya Prajatantra Party led by Surya Bahadur Thapa wins 20 votes.
30 November 1994	14 Mangshir 2051	CPN (Unified Marxist–Leninist) forms a minority government with Man Mohan Adhikari as the prime minister.
13 June 1995	30 Jestha 2052	King Birendra prematurely dissolves the parliament upon the suggestion of prime minister Man Mohan Adhikari.
28 August 1995	12 Bhadra 2052	The Supreme Court reinstates the parliament following a complaint lodged by Sher Bahadur Deuba, Lokendra Bahadur Chand, etc.
10 September 1995	25 Bhadra 2052	Prime minister Man Mohan Adhikari resigns after losing in a Congress led no-confidence motion.
12 September 1995	27 Bhadra 2052	Sher Bahadur Deuba becomes the prime minister after the coalition of Nepali Congress, Rastriya Prajatantra Party, and Sadbhavana Party.
13 February 1996	1 Falgun 2052	The CPN (Maoist Centre) initiates Nepalese Civil War. More than 17,000 people died in this civil war.
6 March 1997	23 Falgun 2053	Prime minister Sher Bahadur Deuba loses a vote of confidence.
10 March 1997	27 Falgun 2053	Lokendra Bahadur Chand becomes the prime minister after a coalition of Rastriya Prajatantra Party, Communist Party of Nepal, and Sadbhavana Party.
11 September 1997	26 Bhadra 2054	Former prime minister and Nepali Congress leader Matrika Prasad Koirala dies at the age of 85 due to cardiac arrest.
17 September 1997	1 Ashwin 2054	Nepali Congress leader Ganesh Man Singh dies at the age of 81.
4 October 1997	18 Ashwin 2054	Government headed by Lokendra Bahadur Chand is defeated in a vote of no-confidence led by Girija Prasad Koirala.
6 October 1997	20 Ashwin 2054	Surya Bahadur Thapa of Rastriya Prajatantra Party forms a coalition government.
5 March 1998	31 Falgun 2054	A major faction of CPN (Unified Marxist–Leninist) leaves the party and forms the CPN (Marxist–Leninist) (1998) with Bam Dev Gautam as its chairman.
10 April 1998	28 Chaitra 2054	Prime minister Surya Bahadur Thapa resigns following a prior agreement with Nepali Congress.
12 April 1998	30 Chaitra 2054	Girija Prasad Koirala forms a minority government. Later joined by CPN (Unified Marxist–Leninist), and Sadbhavana Party.
15 January 1999	1 Magh 2055	King Birendra dissolves the parliament calling for an election in May. CPN (Maoist Centre) boycotts the election.
19 April 1999	6 Baisakh 2056	Former prime minister and CPN (Unified Marxist–Leninist) leader Man Mohan Adhikari dies due to a heart attack.
3–17 May 1999	20 Baisakh-3 Jestha 2056	1999 Nepalese general election is held in two phases. Nepali Congress led by Krishna Prasad Bhattarai wins the election with 111 votes, while the CPN (Unified Marxist–Leninist) led by Madhav Kumar Nepal wins 71 votes and the Rastriya Prajatantra Party led by Surya Bahadur Thapa wins 11 votes.
31 May 1999	17 Jestha 2056	Krishna Prasad Bhattarai of Nepali Congress becomes the prime minister for the second time.
16 February 2000	4 Falgun 2056	A major faction of Nepali Congress led by Girija Prasad Koirala signs a no-confidence motion against the prime minister.
16 March 2000	3 Chaitra 2056	Prime minister Krishna Prasad Bhattarai resigns. Girija Prasad Koirala to become the next prime minister for the third time.
1 June 2001	19 Jestha 2058	Nepalese royal massacre occurs; King Birendra and his family dies, and Dipendra is crownd king while in hospital.
4 June 2001	22 Jestha 2058	King Dipendra is pronounced dead; His uncle Gyanendra becomes the king.
23 July 2001	8 Shrawan 2058	The government and the CPN (Maoist Centre) rebels announce a temporary ceasefire to negotiate peace deals.
26 July 2001	11 Shrawan 2058	Prime minister Girija Prasad Koirala resigns as he fails to tackle the uprising violence; Sher Bahadur Deuba replaces him.
13 November 2001	28 Kartik 2058	The ceasefire between the government and the CPN (Maoist Centre) rebels stops after failed negotiations.
26 November 2001	11 Mangshir 2058	The government declares a state of emergency throughout the country and full mobilization of the army against rebels listing the CPN (Maoist Centre) as a "terrorist organization".
15 February 2002	3 Falgun 2058	CPN (Marxist–Leninist) (1998) merges with CPN (Unified Marxist–Leninist). However, C. P. Mainali refuses the merger and restructures his own CPN (Marxist–Leninist) (2002).
22 May 2002	8 Jestha 2059	King Gyanendra dissolves the parliament and called for early elections.
26 May 2002	12 Jestha 2059	Prime minister Deuba splits from Nepali Congress and forms a new party Nepali Congress (Democratic) over a dispute with Girija Prasad Koirala about the renewal of the state of emergency.
4 October 2002	18 Ashwin 2059	Prime minister Deuba formally asks the king to defer the election dates until November 2003. King Gyanendra responds by dismissing the government headed by Deuba, removing Deuba as the prime minister, postponing the elections indefinitely, and assuming full executive power.
11 October 2002	25 Ashwin 2059	King Gyanendra appoints Lokendra Bahadur Chand of Rastriya Prajatantra Party as the prime minister. It's his fourth term as a prime minister.
5 June 2003	22 Jestha 2060	Surya Bahadur Thapa becomes the prime minister for the fifth time.
4 June 2004	22 Jestha 2061	King Gyanendra appoints Sher Bahadur Deuba as the prime minister. This is his third term as the prime minister.
1 February 2005	19 Magh 2061	2005 Nepal coup d'état by King Gyanendra after which he assumes absolute direct power, sacks the government, and declares a state of emergency restoring absolute monarchy. Many prominent leaders including the prime minister were placed under house arrest.
22 November 2005	7 Mangshir 2062	Several political parties and the CPN (Maoist Centre) sign an agreement to work together against the rule of King Gyanendra.
24 April 2006	11 Baisakh 2063	King Gyanendra reinstates the dissolved parliament calling the Seven Party Alliance to lead the government.
28 April 2006	15 Baisakh 2063	Girija Prasad Koirala becomes the prime minister for the fourth time.
21 November 2006	5 Mangshir 2063	Comprehensive Peace Accord is signed between the Government of Nepal and Maoist Leader Prachanda which allows the Maoist to join mainstream politics.
15 January 2007	1 Magh 2063	An interim constitution is drafted by a committee headed by a Justice that replaces the 1990 constitution.
10 April 2008	28 Chaitra 2064	The First Nepalese Constituent Assembly election is held where the CPN (Maoist Centre) emerged victorious winning 220 out of the 575 seats. It forms the government with seven other communist parties including the CPN (Unified Marxist–Leninist).
28 May 2008	15 Jestha 2065	Constituent Assembly abolishes monarchy in Nepal, and declares Nepal a federal republic.

== Federal republic: 2008–present ==
Date in A.D.	Date in B.S.	Event
23 July 2008	8 Shrawan 2065	Dr. Ram Baran Yadav becomes the first president of Nepal.
15 August 2008	31 Shrawan 2065	Prachanda is elected as the prime minister by the constituent assembly.
3 May 2009	20 Baisakh 2066	Prime minister Prachanda sacks General Rookmangud Katawal. CPN (Unified Marxist–Leninist) withdraws its support from the government in protest. President Ram Baran Yadav overrides the decision resulting in the resignation of Prachanda the next day.
25 May 2009	11 Jestha 2066	Madhav Kumar Nepal of CPN (Unified Marxist–Leninist) becomes the prime minister with the support from 22 of the 25 parties.
20 March 2010	7 Chaitra 2066	Former prime minister and NCP leader Girija Prasad Koirala dies.
28 May 2010	14 Jestha 2067	The constituent assembly's deadline to promulgate a new constitution is extended by a year.
30 June 2010	16 Ashar 2067	Prime minister Madhav Kumar Nepal announces his resignation blaming the CPN (Maoist Centre) for their continuous obstruction in the government.
3 February 2011	20 Magh 2067	CPN (Maoist Centre) withdraws its candidate and backs Jhala Nath Khanal of CPN (Unified Marxist–Leninist). Khanal becomes the prime minister after more than seven months of political gridlock and more than sixteen rounds of voting in the parliament.
28 May 2011	14 Jestha 2068	The constituent assembly's deadline to promulgate a new constitution expires.
14 August 2011	29 Shrawan 2068	Prime minister Jhala Nath Khanal resigns after his government to failed to complete the peace process and draft a new constitution.
28 August 2011	11 Bhadra 2068	Baburam Bhattarai is elected as the prime minister after he gets support from some smaller parties.
29 August 2011	12 Bhadra 2068	The constituent assembly's deadline is extended for the third time. New deadline is set as 30 November 2011.
29 November 2011	13 Mangshir 2068	The constituent assembly's deadline is extended for the fourth time after the Supreme Court of Nepal allows CA to extend its deadline for the last time by a maximum of six months. New deadline is set as 27 May 2012.
3 May 2012	21 Baisakh 2069	All the ministers resign to allow the prime minister to form a consensus government with other political parties.
28 May 2012	15 Jestha 2069	Prime minister Baburam Bhattarai dissolves the constituent assembly after it failed to promulgate a new constitution four years after its election and calls for a; fresh election for 22 November.: Major political parties including the Nepali Congress, and the CPN (Unified Marxist–Leninist) demand Bhattarai's resignation, accusing his unilateral decision; as "unconstitutional".
14 March 2013	1 Chaitra 2069	Prime minister Baburam Bhattarai resigns. Chief Justice Khil Raj Regmi becomes the interim prime minister until the elections after four main political parties agreed to form a CJ-led electoral cabinet.
19 November 2013	4 Mangshir 2070	The Second Nepalese Constituent Assembly election is held where the Nepali Congress led by Sushil Koirala emerges as the largest party winning 196 out of the 576 seats. The CPN (Unified Marxist–Leninist) wins 175 seats while the CPN (Maoist Centre) wins 80 seats.
25 February 2014	13 Falgun 2070	Sushil Koirala of Nepali Congress is elected as the prime minister with CPN (Unified Marxist–Leninist) backing.
20 September 2015	3 Ashwin 2072	President Dr. Ram Baran Yadav promulgates the Constitution of Nepal (2015) replacing the Interim Constitution of 2007.
26 September 2015	9 Ashwin 2072	Former prime minister Baburam Bhattarai of CPN (Maoist Centre) resigns from the parliament, and quits the party.
10 October 2015	23 Ashwin 2072	Prime minister Sushil Koirala resigns honoring a pledge to step down once the constitution is promulgated.
11 October 2015	24 Ashwin 2072	CPN (Unified Marxist–Leninist) leader KP Sharma Oli is elected as the prime minister by the parliament with the backing from CPN (Maoist Centre). Former prime minister Sushil Koirala is defeated in the election.
29 October 2015	12 Kartik 2072	Bidya Devi Bhandari becomes the second president of Nepal.
12 June 2016	30 Jestha 2073	Baburam Bhattarai establishes a new party under his leadership called the Naya Shakti Party, Nepal.
24 July 2016	10 Shrawan 2073	Prime minister KP Sharma Oli resigns after CPN (Maoist Centre) withdraws its support from the government.
3 August 2016	19 Shrawan 2073	Prachanda becomes the prime minister for the second time after a power sharing agreement with the Nepali Congress.
26 April 2017	13 Baisakh 2074	Six Madhesi political parties unite to form Rastriya Janata Party Nepal.
24 May 2017	10 Jestha 2074	Prime minister Prachanda resigns honouring a power sharing agreement with the Nepali Congress.
7 June 2017	24 Jestha 2074	Sher Bahadur Deuba becomes the prime minister for the fourth time with the support of CPN (Maoist Centre), Rastriya Prajatantra Party, etc.
26 November 2017	10 Mangshir 2074	2017 Nepalese general election is held in two phases. CPN (Unified Marxist–Leninist) led by KP Sharma Oli wins the election with 121 seats. Nepali Congress gets 63 seats while the CPN (Maoist Centre) gets 53 seats.
15 February 2018	3 Falgun 2074	KP Sharma Oli becomes the prime minister after the coalition of CPN (Unified Marxist–Leninist) and CPN (Maoist Centre).
17 May 2018	3 Jestha 2075	CPN (Unified Marxist–Leninist) and CPN (Maoist Centre) merge to form Nepal Communist Party with both Oli and Prachanda as the chairmen. his turns the KP Sharma Oli's coalition government to a two-thirds majority in the House.
6 May 2019	23 Baisakh 2076	Naya Shakti Party, Nepal led by Baburam Bhattarai and Federal Socialist Forum, Nepal led by Upendra Yadav merge to form Samajbadi Party, Nepal.
23 April 2020	11 Baisakh 2077	Samajbadi Party, Nepal and Rastriya Janata Party Nepal merge to form People's Socialist Party, Nepal.
18 November 2020	3 Mangshir 2077	A faction within the Nepal Communist Party led by Pushpa Kamal Dahal, Madhav Kumar Nepal, Jhala Nath Khanal, etc. accuses prime minister KP Sharma Oli of inefficiency and pressures him to give up either the party presidency or the premiership or else face a vote of no-confidence in both party and the House.
20 December 2020	5 Poush 2077	Amidst the deepening internal crisis within the Nepal Communist Party, prime minister KP Sharma Oli dissolves the parliament, which is promptly approved by president Bidya Devi Bhandari, and calls for general elections.
22 December 2020	7 Poush 2077	Dahal-Nepal faction expels prime minister KP Sharma Oli as the chairman of the Nepal Communist Party and appoints Madhav Kumar Nepal as the chairman.; KP Sharma Oli replaces Narayan Kaji Shrestha with Pradeep Kumar Gyawali as the party's spokesperson and adds 556 members to the existing 446; members in the party's central committee.
24 December 2020	9 Poush 2077	Oli led faction of NCP expels Pushpa Kamal Dahal as the chairman and suspends his party membership on the basis of disciplinary charges.
25 January 2021	12 Magh 2077	The Election Commission of Nepal declines to recognize neither Oli's faction nor Dahal-Nepal's faction as the legitimate holder of Nepal Communist Party's registration.
23 February 2021	11 Falgun 2077	The Supreme Court overturns prime minister Oli's decision to dissolve the House citing Articles 85, 76(1), 76(7) – failed to provide sufficient grounds to dissolve the House. The court also orders to summon a meeting of the Parliament within 13 days.
8 March 2021	24 Falgun 2077	The Supreme Court nullifies the unification of Nepal Communist Party stating that the name Nepal Communist Party was already allotted to a party led by Rishi Kattel and thus, by extension, the merger itself was void ab initio. After this ruling, Nepal Communist Party was no longer legally recognized, and also the CPN (Unified Marxist–Leninist), and the CPN (Maoist Centre) were revived to their pre-merger state.
10 May 2021	27 Baisakh 2078	Prime minister KP Sharma Oli loses a vote of confidence in the parliament.
13 May 2021	30 Baisakh 2078	KP Sharma Oli is reappointed as the prime minister as the opposition failed to prove their majority.
22 May 2021	8 Jestha 2078	President Bidya Devi Bhandari dissolves the parliament again on the recommendation of prime minister KP Sharma Oli and calls for elections. This move by KP Sharma Oli came after CPN (Maoist Centre) along with Madhav Kumar Nepal and Jhala Nath Khanal supported the Nepali Congress-led alliance.
12 July 2021	28 Ashar 2078	The Supreme Court overturns prime minister KP Sharma Oli's decision to dissolve the House, and issues an order to appoint Sher Bahadur Deuba as the prime minister within 28 hours citing Article 76 (5) of the constitution.
13 July 2021	29 Ashar 2078	Sher Bahadur Deuba is appointed as the prime minister for the fifth time.
25 August 2021	9 Bhadra 2078	Madhav Kumar Nepal and Jhala Nath Khanal along with other politicians leave the CPN (Unified Marxist–Leninist) and form a new party called the Communist Party of Nepal (Unified Socialist).
24 July 2022	8 Shrawan 2079	Baburam Bhattarai leaves People's Socialist Party, Nepal and forms Nepal Socialist Party.
22 November 2022	6 Mangshir 2079	2022 Nepalese general election is held and the Nepali Congress wins the election with 89 votes. CPN (Unified Marxist–Leninist) wins 78 votes while the CPN (Maoist Centre) wins 32 votes.
26 December 2022	11 Poush 2079	Prachanda becomes the prime minister for the third time after backing by CPN (Unified Marxist–Leninist), Rastriya Swatantra Party, Rastriya Prajatantra Party, etc.
10 January 2022	26 Poush 2079	Prime minister Prachanda wins the vote of confidence in parliament after 268 out of the present 270 members vote in his favor.
9 March 2022	25 Falgun 2079	Ram Chandra Paudel, a senior leader of Nepali Congress, becomes the third president of Nepal defeating Subas Chandra Nemwang, a former speaker of the lower house.
