= All Nepal Communist Revolutionary Coordination Committee (Marxist–Leninist) =

All Nepal Communist Revolutionary Coordination Committee (Marxist–Leninist) was a revolutionary communist movement formed in Nepal in 1975. ANCRCC( ML) had its roots in Jhapa District Committee of the Communist Party of Nepal as well as the Morang-based Nepal Revolutionary Organisation (Marxist-Leninist). In Jhapa armed struggle had been developed, inspired by the Naxalite movement in India.

ANCRCC (ML) gradually grew through engulfing other, minor communist factions by a series of mergers:

- August 30, 1977: Mukti Morcha Samuha.
- August 1978: A section of the Dhanusa District Committee of the Communist Party of Nepal
- September 11, 1978:Revolutionary Communist Organising Committee
- December 12, 1978: Sandesh Samuha

On December 26, 1978 ANCRCC (ML) launched Communist Party of Nepal (Marxist-Leninist).

== Press ==
ANCRCC (ML) published Varg-Sangarsh and Mukti-Morcha.
