= List of communist parties in Nepal =

The Communist Party of Nepal is a name used by a number of Nepalese political parties claiming allegiance to communism. Most trace their roots back to the original Communist Party of Nepal formed in 1949.

== Active parties ==
=== National parties ===
Election Symbol	Political party	Leader	Founded	Federal Parliament		Provincial Assemblies	Local government	Notes
Election Symbol	Political party	Leader	Founded	Pratinidhi Sabha	Rastriya Sabha	Provincial Assemblies	Local government	Notes
	Nepali Communist Party	Pushpa Kamal Dahal	2025	17 / 275	18 / 59	107 / 550	6,030 / 35,097	Formed through merger of 10 different communist parties
	Communist Party of Nepal (UML)	Khadga Prasad Oli	1991	25 / 275	12 / 59	161 / 550	11,929 / 35,097	Formed through merger of CPN (Marxist) and CPN (Marxist–Leninist); Re-founded after split of Nepal Communist Party

=== Other local parties ===
Election Symbol	Name	Leader	Founded	Federal Parliament		Provincial Assemblies	Local government	Notes
Election Symbol	Name	Leader	Founded	Pratinidhi Sabha	Rastriya Sabha	Provincial Assemblies	Local government	Notes
	Rastriya Janamorcha	Chitra Bahadur K.C.	2006	0 / 275	1 / 59	1 / 550	159 / 35,097	Split from Janamorcha Nepal; Electoral front of CPN (Masal)
	Nepal Majdoor Kisan Party	Narayan Man Bijukchhe	1975	0 / 275		3 / 550	85 / 35,057	Split from the CPN (Pushpa Lal); Originally founded as Nepal Workers and Peasants Organization

=== Minor parties ===
Name	Leader	Notes
CPN (Maoist)	Netra Bikram Chand	Split from the Communist Party of Nepal (Revolutionary Maoist)
CPN (United)	Ghanashyam Bhusal	Merged with Chandra Dev Joshi party
Scientific Socialist Communist Party, Nepal	Bishwabhakta Dulal	Split from Communist Party of Nepal (Maoist Centre)
Communist Party of Nepal (Marxist–Leninist)	Chandra Prakash Mainali	Split from the Communist Party of Nepal (Marxist-Leninist)
Communist Party of Nepal (Revolutionary Maoist)	Mohan Baidya	Split from the Unified Communist Party of Nepal (Maoist)
Patriotic People's Republican Front, Nepal	Chandra Prakash Gajurel	Electoral front of Communist Party of Nepal (Revolutionary Maoist)
Communist Party of Nepal	Rishi Kattel	Formed through a merger of the Communist Party of Nepal (Unified), the Communist Party of Nepal Marxist−Leninist (Samajbadi), the Communist Party of Nepal (United Marxist), the Marxist Communist Party of Nepal, Bidrohi ML and the Independent Thought Group
Communist Party of Nepal (Marxist–Leninist-Socialist)	Bishnu Raj Aryal	
Communist Party of Nepal (Marxist)	Ambika Prasad Baidya	
Communist Party of Nepal (Masal)	Mohan Bikram Singh	Split from the Communist Party of Nepal (Unity Centre-Masal)
Communist Party of Nepal Nationalist	Min Nath Devkota	
Maoist Communist Party, Nepal	Ram Narayan Prasad Pal	
Communist Party of Nepal Marxist (Pushpalal)	Man Dhoj Gurung	
Communist Party of Nepal (Democratic)	Sudeep Ruwali	

== Defunct parties ==
Name	Foundation Year	Dissolution Year	Notes
Communist League	1946		
Communist Party of Nepal	1949	1962	Split into Communist Party of Nepal (Amatya) and Communist Party of Nepal (Raymajhi)
Communist Party of Nepal (Amatya)	1962 1992	1991 1994	Split from Communist Party of Nepal Merged with Communist Party of Nepal (Burma) and Communist Party of Nepal (Democratic) to form Communist Party of Nepal (United) Split from Communist Party of Nepal (United) in 1992 to refound the party Merged into Communist Party of Nepal (Unified Marxist-Leninist)
Communist Party of Nepal (Burma)	1962 1992	1991 2001	Split from Communist Party of Nepal Originally founded as Communist Party of Nepal (Raymajhi) Renamed in 1983 as Communist Party of Nepal (Burma) Merged with Communist Party of Nepal (Amatya) and Communist Party of Nepal (Democratic) to form Communist Party of Nepal (United) Split from Communist Party of Nepal (United) in 1992 to refound the party Merged into Communist Party of Nepal (Unified Marxist-Leninist)
Communist Party of Nepal (Pushpa Lal)	1968	1987	Split from Communist Party of Nepal (Amatya) Merged with Communist Party of Nepal (Manmohan) to form Communist Party of Nepal (Marxist)
Nepal Revolutionary Organisation (Marxist–Leninist)	1973	1975	Founded All Nepal Communist Revolutionary Coordination Committee (Marxist-Leninist)
Communist Party of Nepal (Fourth Convention)	1974	1990	Split from Central Nucleus Merged with Communist Party of Nepal (Mashal) to form Communist Party of Nepal (Unity Centre)
Proletarian Revolutionary Organisation, Nepal	1974	1978	Split from Communist Party of Nepal (Pushpa Lal) Originally formed as Communist Unity Contact Forum Nepal Renamed to Proletarian Revolutionary Organization, Nepal in 1976 Merged into Nepal Workers and Peasants Organization
All Nepal Communist Revolutionary Coordination Committee (Marxist–Leninist)	1975	1978	Founded from Nepal Revolutionary Organization (Marxist-Leninist) Founded Communist Party of Nepal (Marxist-Leninist)
Mukti Morcha Samuha	1976	1977	Split from Communist Party of Nepal (Pushpa Lal) Merged into All Nepal Communist Revolutionary Coordination Committee (Marxist-Leninist)
Communist Party of Nepal (Marxist–Leninist)	1978	1991	Founded from All Nepal Communist Revolutionary Coordination Committee (Marxist-Leninist) Merged with Communist Party of Nepal (Marxist) to form Communist Party of Nepal (Unified Marxist-Leninist)
Communist Party of Nepal (Democratic)	1979	1991	Split from Communist Party of Nepal (Raymajhi) Originally founded as Communist Party of Nepal (Manandhar) Renamed to Communist Party of Nepal (Democratic) in 1991 Merged with Communist Party of Nepal (Burma) and Communist Party of Nepal (Amatya) to form Communist Party of Nepal (United)
Communist Party of Nepal (Manmohan)	1979	1986	Split from Central Nucleus Originally formed as Communist Party of Nepal (Unity Conference) Renamed to Communist Party of Nepal (Manmohan) in 1982 Merged with Communist Party of Nepal (Pushpa Lal) to form Communist Party of Nepal (Marxist)
Rebel Unity Centre	1980	1981	Split from Communist Party of Nepal (Fourth Convention) Merged into Communist Party of Nepal (Marxist-Leninist)
Proletarian Communist League	1980	1983	Split from Ati Gopyatabadi Group Formed Proletarian Workers Organization with a splinter group of Nepal Workers and Peasants Organization
Communist Party of Nepal (Marxist–Leninist–Maoist)	1981	2005	Originally founded as Nepal Marxist-Leninist Party Merged with Communist Party of Nepal (Malema) to form Communist Party of Nepal (Marxist-Leninist-Maoist Centre)
Nepal Workers and Peasants Organisation (Hareram Sharma)	1981	1981	Split from Nepal Workers and Peasants Organisation
Nepal Front	1981		Split from Nepal Workers and Peasants Organization (Hareram Sharma)
Nepal Workers and Peasants Organisation (D.P. Singh)	1981	1986	Split from Nepal Workers and Peasants Organisation (Hareram Sharma) Merged into Communist Party of Nepal (Marxist-Leninist)
Communist Party of Nepal (Matri Samuha)	1983	1984	Split from Communist Party of Nepal (Burma)
Communist Party of Nepal (Masal)	1983	2001	Split from Communist Party of Nepal (Fourth Convention) Merged with Communist Party of Nepal (Unity Centre) to form Communist Party of Nepal (Unity Centre-Masal)
Communist Party of Nepal (Mashal)	1984	1991	Split from Communist Party of Nepal (Masal) Merged with Communist Party of Nepal (Fourth Convention) to form Communist Party of Nepal (Unity Centre)
Communist Party of Nepal (Marxist)	1986	1991	Founded through the merger of Communist Party of Nepal (Manmohan) and Communist Party of Nepal (Pushpa Lal) Merged with Communist Party of Nepal (Marxist-Leninist) to form Communist Party of Nepal (Unified Marxist-Leninist)
Communist Party of Nepal (Unity Centre)	1991	2001	Founded through the merger of Communist Party of Nepal (Mashal) and Communist Party of Nepal (Fourth Convention) Merged with Communist Party of Nepal (Masal) to form Communist Party of Nepal (Unity Centre-Masal)
Communist Party of Nepal (Marxist)	1991	2005	Split from Communist Party of Nepal (Unified Marxist-Leninist) Originally founded as Communist Party of Nepal (15 September 1949) Merged with Communist Party of Nepal (United) to form Communist Party of Nepal (United Marxist)
Communist Party of Nepal (United)	1991	2005	Founded through merger of Communist Party of Nepal (Burma), Communist Party of Nepal (Amatya) and Communist Party of Nepal (Democratic) Merged with Communist Party of Nepal (Marxist) to form Communist Party of Nepal (United Marxist)
Communist Party of Nepal (Unified Marxist–Leninist)	1991	2018	Founded through merger of Communist Party of Nepal (Marxist) and Communist Party of Nepal (Marxist-Leninist) Merged with Communist Party of Nepal (Maoist Centre) to form Nepal Communist Party
Communist Party of Nepal (Maoist Centre)	1994	2018	Split from Communist Party of Nepal (Unity Centre) Originally founded as Communist Party of Nepal (Maoist) Renamed in 2008 as Unified Communist Party of Nepal (Maoist) Renamed in 2016 as Communist Party of Nepal (Maoist Centre) Merged with Communist Party of Nepal (Unified Marxist-Leninist) to form Nepal Communist Party
Communist Party of Nepal (Marxist–Leninist)	1998	2002	Split from Communist Party of Nepal (Unified Marxist-Leninist) Merged into Communist Party of Nepal (Unified Marxist-Leninist)
Communist Party of Nepal (Masal)	1999	2009	Split from Communist Party of Nepal (Masal) Merged with Communist Party of Nepal
Communist Party of Nepal (Malema)	1999	2005	Split from Communist Party of Nepal (Marxist-Leninist-Maoist) Merged with Communist Party of Nepal (Marxist-Leninist-Maoist) to form Communist Party of Nepal (Marxist-Leninist-Maoist Centre)
Communist Party of Nepal (Unity Centre–Masal)	2002	2009	Formed through merger of Communist Party of Nepal (Masal) and Communist Party of Nepal (Unity Centre) Merged into Communist Party of Nepal (Maoist) to form Unified Communist Party of Nepal (Maoist)
Communist Party of Nepal (Marxist–Leninist–Maoist Centre)	2005	2007	Formed through merger of Communist Party of Nepal (Marxist-Leninist-Maoist) and Communist Party of Nepal (Malema) Merged into Communist Party of Nepal (Maoist)
Communist Party of Nepal (United Marxist)	2005	2013	Formed through merger of Communist Party of Nepal (Marxist) and Communist Party of Nepal (United) Merged with Communist Party of Nepal (Unified), Communist Party of Nepal Marxist-Leninist (Socialist), Marxist Communist Party of Nepal, Birodhi Marxist-Leninist and Independent Thought Group to form Communist Party of Nepal
Communist Party of Nepal	2006	2006	Split from Communist Party of Nepal (Unity Centre-Masal) Merged into Communist Party of Nepal (Maoist)
Communist Party of Nepal (Unified)	2007	2013	Formed through merger of splinter groups of Communist Party of Nepal (Marxist-Leninist), Communist Party of Nepal (Unity Centre-Masal) and Communist Party of Nepal (Marxist-Leninist-Maoist Centre) Merged with Communist Party of Nepal (United Marxist), Communist Party of Nepal Marxist-Leninist (Socialist), Marxist Communist Party of Nepal, Birodhi Marxist-Leninist and Independent Thought Group to form Communist Party of Nepal
Communist Party of Nepal (United)	2007	2017	Split from Communist Party of Nepal (United Marxist) Merged into Communist Party of Nepal (Maoist Centre)
Revolutionary Left Wing	2008		Split from Unified Communist Party of Nepal (Maoist)
Communist Party of Nepal (Maoist)	2009	2016	Split from Unified Communist Party of Nepal (Maoist) Merged with Unified Communist Party of Nepal (Maoist) to form Communist Party of Nepal (Maoist Centre)
Communist Party of Nepal Marxist−Leninist (Socialist)	2010	2013	Split from Communist Party of Nepal (Marxist-Leninist) Merged with Communist Party of Nepal (United Marxist), Communist Party of Nepal (Unified), Marxist Communist Party of Nepal, Birodhi Marxist-Leninist and Independent Thought Group to form Communist Party of Nepal
Communist Party of Nepal (United Marxist)	2013	2017	
Nepal Communist Party	2019	2021	Formed through merger of CPN (UML) and CPN (Maoist Centre)
Barre Sangarsh Samuha			Split from Communist Party of Nepal (Pushpa Lal) Merged into Communist Party of Nepal (Marxist-Leninist)
Central Nucleus			
Communist Party of Nepal (Janamukhi)			
Independent Thought Group			
Marxist Communist Party of Nepal			
Marxist–Leninist Revolutionary Communist Party			
Nepal Communist League			Split from Communist Party of Nepal (Manmohan) Merged into Communist Party of Nepal (Unified Marxist-Leninist)
Nepal Red Communist Party			Split from Communist League
Nepal Samyabadi Dal			
Rebel Marxist–Leninist			
Revolutionary Communist Organisation, Nepal		1980	Merged into Communist Party of Nepal (Marxist-Leninist)
Revolutionary Communist Organising Committee		1978	Merged into All Nepal Communist Revolutionary Coordination Committee (Marxist-Leninist)
Sandesh Samuha		1978	Merged into All Nepal Communist Revolutionary Coordination Committee (Marxist-Leninist)
Communist Party of Nepal (Unified Socialist)	2021	2025	Merged to form Nepali Communist Party
Communist Party of Nepal (Maoist Centre)	1994	2025	Merged to form Nepali Communist Party
Communist Party of Nepal (Maoist Centre)	2017	2025	Merged to form Nepali Communist Party
Communist Party of Nepal Maoist Socialist		2025	Merged to form Nepali Communist Party
Communist Party of Nepal (Socialist)		2025	Merged to form Nepali Communist Party
Communist Party of Nepal (Gauravshali)		2025	Merged to form Nepali Communist Party
