= Jibaraj Ashrit =

Nepali communist revolutionary

Personal details
- Born: August 1944 Harewa, Nepal
- Died: May 16, 1993 (aged 48–49) Dasdhunga, Chitwan
- Party: CPN UML

Jibaraj Ashrit (August 1944 - 16 May 1993) was a Nepali communist revolutionary. He was part of the Mukti Morcha Samuha. He died in a vehicular accident (suspected assassination) in Dasdhunga, Chitwan on 16 May 1993 while travelling with another communist leader, Madan Bhandari. He was the head of Organisation department of CPN UML at the time of his death.

== Career ==
Ashrit entered politics as a student. He became a member of Communist Party of Nepal in 1964–65. He was a political prisoner between 1969 and 1972. He was known for his skill in building an organised movement, and was CPN UML's Chief of Organisation Department at the time of his death.

== Views ==
Jibaraj Ashrit was a strong advocate of ending all forms of casteism and worked to empower women and increase their participation in active politics.

== Personal life ==
He was born in August 1944 (18 Shrawan 2001 BS) in Harewa, Gulmi District. He was married to Maya Gyawali.

== Death ==
As CPN UML's Chief of Organisation Department, he was travelling the country in 1993. While travelling with party Secretary Madan Bhandari, from Pokhara, where he was participating in the party's Kaski District Conference, to Chitwan, where the district conference of the Women wing of the party and other programmes were scheduled, he died in a vehicular accident at Dasdhunga of Kabilash VDC, Chitwan. Although ruled an accident, many, including prominent politicians of Nepal Communist Party (NCP), consider the deaths as unresolved case, and are known to accuse political rivals of the murder of Ashrit and Bhandari via a conspiracy that was covered up during the investigation. Their driver, who had survived the accident, was gunned down in Kirtipur, years later.

== Legacy ==
In 2010, Jibaraj Ashrit Foundation was established in Deepnagar, Butwal, with the goal of raising awareness about and preserving the memory.of his life and contributions. In 2019, Jibaraj Ashrit Museum built by the foundation with six of the eight million rupees granted to it by the Ministry of Culture opened for the public. Among the attractions were reported to be his writings, clothes and other items owned and used by him, biographical documentaries on him, as well as Rs 1,300 found on his person after his death and a 10-band radio gifted to him by Pradeep Gyawali.

== See also ==
- Madan Ashrit Highway
