= Proletarian revolution =

Social revolution in which the working class attempts to overthrow the bourgeoisie

A proletarian revolution or proletariat revolution is a social revolution in which the proletariat attempts to overthrow the bourgeoisie and change the previous political system. Proletarian revolutions are generally advocated by socialists, communists and anarchists.

== Interpretations ==
The concept of a revolutionary proletariat was first put forward by the French revolutionary socialist and radical Auguste Blanqui. The Paris Commune, contemporary to Blanqui and Karl Marx, being viewed by some as the first attempt at a proletarian revolution.

Marx wrote of the class conscious proletariat being the active agent of revolution, which distinguished him from Blanqui who viewed a selective revolutionary conspiracy among all the lower classes as being the driving force of a proletarian revolution. This was also in contrast to the views of the communist William Weitling and the anarchist Mikhail Bakunin who viewed the lumpenproletariat as the driver of the proletarian revolution. Through Marx and Friedrich Engels' work they write that if the proletariat does not make up a majority, it must at least occupy an important position among the popular mass to achieve a proletarian revolution. Some later Marxists, such as Georgi Plekhanov, emphasized the need for a majority of the population to be proletarianized for a proletarian revolution to occur.

Marxists believe proletarian revolutions can and will likely happen in all capitalist countries, related to the concept of world revolution. The objective of a proletarian revolution, according to Marxists, is to transform the bourgeois state into a workers' state. A traditional Marxist belief was that a proletarian revolution could only occur in a country where capitalism had fully developed, though this changed with Russian Revolution.

The Leninist branch of Marxism argues that a proletarian revolution must be led by a vanguard of "professional revolutionaries", men and women who are fully dedicated to the communist cause and who form the nucleus of the communist revolutionary movement. This vanguard is meant to provide leadership and organization to the working class before and during the revolution, which aims to prevent the government from successfully ending it. Vladimir Lenin believed that it was imperative to arm the working class to secure their leverage over the bourgeoisie. Lenin's words were printed in an article in German on the nature of pacifism and said "In every class society, whether based on slavery, serfdom, or, as at present, on wage-labour, the oppressor class is always armed." It was under such conditions that the first successful proletarian revolution, the Russian Revolution, occurred.

Other Marxists, such as Luxemburgists and left communists, disagree with the Leninist idea of a vanguard and insist that the entire working class—or at least a large part of it—must be deeply involved and equally committed to the socialist or communist cause for a proletarian revolution to be successful. To this end, they seek to build mass working class movements with a very large membership. The Situationists' view is that as well as the standard proletariat being a driving force for revolution, other oppressed classes would also act as drivers.

Finally, there are socialist anarchists and libertarian socialists. Their view is that the revolution must be a bottom-up social revolution which seeks to transform all aspects of society and the individuals which make up the society (see Revolutionary Catalonia). The anarchist view also holds that the proletarian revolution must abolish all aspects of the state, and that a "workers' state" should not be formed. Alexander Berkman said "there are revolutions and revolutions. Some revolutions change only the governmental form by putting a new set of rulers in place of the old. These are political revolutions, and as such they often meet with little resistance. But a revolution that aims to abolish the entire system of wage slavery must also do away with the power of one class to oppress another. That is, it is not any more a mere change of rulers, of government, not a political revolution, but one that seeks to alter the whole character of society. That would be a social revolution."

=== Criticism of the Marxist theory ===
One criticism of the Marxist theory about proletarian revolutions is that the theory does not comply with the historical reality. According to the Marxist theory, the revolution would happen in countries with a highly developed capitalist economic system. However, in reality the revolutions happened in countries where capitalism was in its infancy, namely the Russian Empire and China. Marx and Engels thought that the revolution would be dominated by the industrial working class. In reality, the Russian Empire was mainly a country of peasants, namely 80% of the population consisted of farmers at the beginning of the Russian Revolution.

== See also ==
- Bourgeois revolution
- Communist revolution
- Free association of producers, the ultimate goal of communist and anarchist revolutions
- Labour revolt
- October Revolution
- Proletarian nation
- Asturian miners' strike of 1934
- List of peasant revolts
- Revolution of 1934
- Proletarian Revolutionary Organisation, Nepal
- Social revolution
- World revolution
