= Nepal Trade Union Centre =

The Nepal Trade Union Centre (NTUC) was a national trade union centre in Nepal. The organization was founded at a conference in Kathmandu held February 17-19, 1989. Communist Party of Nepal (Marxist) leader Sahana Pradhan inaugurated the event. Leaders like Man Mohan Adhikari, Siddhi Lal Singh and others also spoke at the founding conference.. The founding conference elected Ishwari Chandra Gnyawali as the chairman of the organization. The CPN(M) politburo member Bharat Mohan Adhikari was the general secretary of the Nepal Trade Union Centre.

Following the 1990 Jana Andolan movement, many members from the Nepal Trade Union Centre began to be active in GEFONT organizations. The central office of the Nepal Trade Union Centre was closed in October/November 1991. In November/December 1991 Bharat Mohan Adhikari and the GEFONT general director Mukunda Neupane jointly announced the merger of the Nepal Trade Union Centre into GEFONT.
