= Proletarian Communist League =

Proletarian Labours League (Nepali: सर्वहारा श्रमिक लीग) was a communist group in Nepal. It published (proletarian) Sarvhara (सर्वहारा) as its central organ.

The group emerged around 1980, from one section of the disintegrating Ati Gopyatabadi Group. The organisation condemned the 1980 referendum as a ploy to divert the people from the potential armed struggle. Then educated communist followers and ideologist like Ghanashayam Poudel from Chitwan, renowned writer Khagendra Sangraula, leader as well as writer Ram Nath Sharma 'Aakhil" and his brother Laxmi Nath Sharma, Bhim Parsad Gautam, author Ishwor Shrestha were some of the founder member of this group. They kept the name league with the plan that they will merge into one of the communist parties ultimately. With this thought around 1983 the group formed the Proletarian Workers Organisation together with Ruplal Bishvakarma (who had broken away from the Nepal Workers and Peasants Organisation).

== See also ==
- List of communist parties in Nepal
