= K. P. Sharma Oli =

Nepali politician (born 1952)

- के. पी. शर्मा ओली
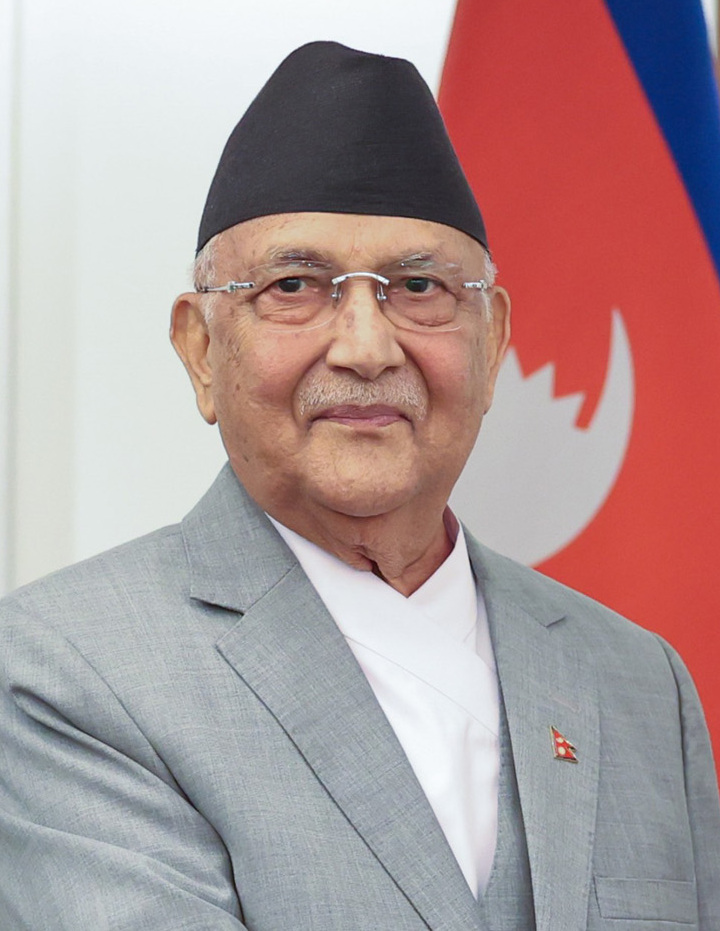
- Oli in 2025

Prime Minister of Nepal
- In office 15 July 2024 – 12 September 2025 (Note: He resigned on 9 September and still served as "caretaker" prime minister until 12 September.)
- President: Ram Chandra Paudel
- Deputy: Bishnu Prasad Paudel; Prakash Man Singh
- Preceded by: Pushpa Kamal Dahal
- Succeeded by: Sushila Karki (interim)
- In office 15 February 2018 – 13 July 2021
- President: Bidya Devi Bhandari
- Preceded by: Sher Bahadur Deuba
- Succeeded by: Sher Bahadur Deuba
- In office 12 October 2015 – 4 August 2016
- President: Ram Baran Yadav; Bidya Devi Bhandari
- Preceded by: Sushil Koirala
- Succeeded by: Pushpa Kamal Dahal

Leader of the Opposition
- In office 27 February 2023 – 4 March 2024
- Prime Minister: Pushpa Kamal Dahal
- Preceded by: Sher Bahadur Deuba
- Succeeded by: Sher Bahadur Deuba
- In office 13 July 2021 – 26 December 2022
- Prime Minister: Sher Bahadur Deuba
- Preceded by: Sher Bahadur Deuba
- Succeeded by: Sher Bahadur Deuba
- In office 4 August 2016 – 15 February 2018
- Prime Minister: Pushpa Kamal Dahal; Sher Bahadur Deuba
- Preceded by: Sher Bahadur Deuba
- Succeeded by: Sher Bahadur Deuba
Ministerial offices
Deputy Prime Minister of Nepal
In office 29 April 2006 – 1 April 2007 Serving with Amik Sherchan
Prime Minister	Girija Prasad Koirala
Preceded by	Bharat Mohan Adhikari
Succeeded by	Bam Dev Gautam
Minister of Foreign Affairs
In office 29 April 2006 – 1 April 2007
Prime Minister	Girija Prasad Koirala
Preceded by	Ramesh Nath Pandey
Succeeded by	Sahana Pradhan
Minister of Home Affairs
In office 30 November 1994 – 12 September 1995
Prime Minister	Man Mohan Adhikari
Preceded by	Sher Bahadur Deuba
Succeeded by	Khum Bahadur Khadka
Senior party positions
Chairman of CPN (UML)
Incumbent
Assumed office 8 March 2021
Preceded by	Position re-established (Party revived as per a Supreme Court verdict)
In office 15 July 2014 – 17 May 2018
Preceded by	Jhala Nath Khanal
Succeeded by	Position abolished (himself as chairman of the Nepal Communist Party)
Chairman of the Nepal Communist Party
In office 17 May 2018 – 8 March 2021 Serving with Pushpa Kamal Dahal
Preceded by	Position established (New party)
Succeeded by	Position abolished (Party dissolved as per a Supreme Court verdict)
Parliamentary offices
Member of the House of Representatives
In office 4 March 2018 – 12 September 2025
Preceded by	Keshav Kumar Budhathoki (as Member of the Legislature Parliament)
Succeeded by	Balen Shah
Constituency	Jhapa 5
In office 28 April 2006 – 16 January 2008
Preceded by	Himself (2002)
Succeeded by	Gauri Shankar Khadka (as Member of the Constituent Assembly)
Constituency	Jhapa 2
In office 23 June 1999 – 22 May 2002
Preceded by	Chandra Prakash Mainali
Succeeded by	Himself (2006)
Constituency	Jhapa 2
In office 20 June 1991 – 15 January 1999
Preceded by	Constituency created
Succeeded by	Gopal Prasad Koirala
Constituency	Jhapa 6
Member of the Constituent Assembly / Legislature Parliament
In office 21 January 2014 – 14 October 2017
Preceded by	Bishwodip Lingden Limbu
Succeeded by	Constituency abolished
Constituency	Jhapa 7

Personal details
- Born: Khadga Prasad Sharma Oli; 22 February 1952 (age 74) Iwa, Nepal
- Party: CPN (UML) (1991–2018; since 2021)
- Other political affiliations: CPN (ML) (1978–1991); NCP (2018–2021)
- Spouse: Radhika Shakya (m. 1987)
- Parents: Mohan Prasad Oli; Madhumaya Oli
- Website: kpsharmaoli.com

Khadga Prasad Sharma Oli (Note: Nepali: खड्ग प्रसाद शर्मा ओली, romanized: Khaḍga Prasād Śarmā Olī; IPA: [kʰʌɽɡʌ‿prʌsäd̪‿sʌrmä‿oli]) (born 22 February 1952) better known as K.P. Sharma Oli, is a Nepali politician who served three terms as the prime minister of Nepal, from 2015 to 2016, 2018 to 2021, and 2024 to 2025. He has served as the chairman of the Communist Party of Nepal (Unified Marxist–Leninist) since 2014.

Oli accused India for the 2015 blockade of Nepal. He strengthened relations with China as an alternative to Nepal's traditionally close trade ties with India. Oli was a member of parliament from 2017 to 2025.

His tenures as prime minister have been controversial for frequent use of tongue-in-cheek remarks, hostility towards critics and the media, and accusations of fostering cronyism, corruption, nepotism, and racism. Following the deaths of students during the anti-corruption Gen Z protests in 2025, he was overthrown from his post. In the 2026 election, Oli lost his seat to the Rastriya Swatantra Party's prime ministerial candidate Balen Shah. In March 2026, Oli was arrested in connection to deaths during the Gen Z protests.

== Early life and education ==
K.P. Sharma Oli was born on 22 February 1952 in Iwa in Tehrathum. His father, Mohan Prasad Oli, was a Brahmin farmer with limited education. His mother, Madhumaya Oli, died from smallpox when he was four. He had a younger brother and three younger sisters from his father's second marriage. Oli completed his primary education at the nearby Pranami Middle School. His family moved to Surunga, Jhapa in 1958 but following floods in the Kankai River, they were left landless and Oli moved in with his grandparents. His family then migrated to Garamani, Jhapa in 1962. He completed his SLC exam from Adarsha Secondary School in 1970. While in Jhapa, Oli was influenced by the anti-Panchayat and Naxalbari movements. He credits his distant uncle Ramnath Dahal for his communist inclination.

== Early political career ==
=== Panchayat era (1970–1991) ===
After he turned eighteen in 1970, Oli became a member of his local chapter of a splinter group of the Communist Party of Nepal. He was arrested in the same year for his involvement in subversive politics. His group later joined the district committee of the Communist Party of Nepal (Manmohan). After the party split in 1972, he became the organizing secretary of a Coordination Committee for the Jhapa rebellion after former secretary Radha Krishna Mainali contracted tuberculosis. Oli, Mohan Chandra Adhikari and Ram Nath Dahal advocated for organizational expansion and public mobilization arguing that authorities would crack down on them for any violent activities. A majority of the committee favored an armed struggle however and in February 1973 he was removed as secretary and had his membership stripped off by hardliners within the committee led by Chandra Prakash Mainali. The next month, Ramnath Dahal was killed by the Panchayat administration.

Following his removal as secretary, Oli went into hiding in Biratnagar. He then got into contact with Mohan Chandra who was in Kanpur, India, at the time. In October 1973 upon his return to Nepal, he was arrested in Rautahat and was imprisoned until 1987. He was first kept in Gaur prison but was moved around before being sent to the Central Jail in Golghar. There he was kept in solitary confinement for four years. Oli was made a central committee member of the Madan Bhandari-led CPN (Marxist–Leninist) while in jail and after his release in 1987 became involved in party activities. He was appointed the Lumbini Zonal chief for the United Left Front in 1989.

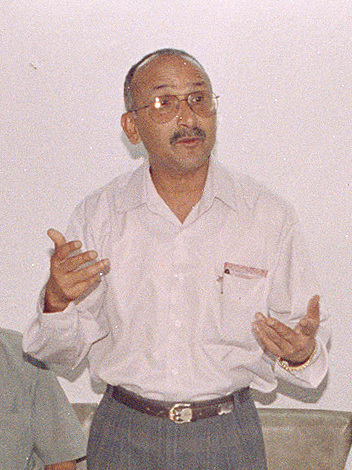
Oli in 1996

=== Parliamentary politics (1991–2015) ===
After CPN (Marxist–Leninist) merged with CPN (Marxist) to form the CPN (Unified Marxist–Leninist) in 1991, Oli became a founding central committee member of the new party. Later that year he became the founding chairman of the Democratic National Youth Federation. In 1992, he was elected as a standing committee member of the party and was appointed as the chief of the party's publicity department. In the 1991 election, Oli was elected from Jhapa 6. Oli supported party general secretary Madan Bhandari's proposal of People's Multiparty Democracy as the party line in the fifth party congress in 1993. After Bhandari's death on 16 May 1993, a commission to conduct an investigation was made by prime minister Girija Prasad Koirala under the leadership of former supreme court justice Prachanda Raj Anil. The UML labeled the party as pro-Congress and formed their own commission headed by Oli. The report by Oli claimed that the crash was an assassination, while the government commission claimed that the incident was an accident.

He was re-elected in the 1994 election from Jhapa 6 and became Home Minister in the minority government of Man Mohan Adhikari. Oli was a coordinator of the party's Mahakali treaty study team and played a key role in the treaty's endorsement in the parliament. He supported general secretary Madhav Kumar Nepal at the party's sixth national congress which was boycotted by members led by deputy general secretary Bam Dev Gautam. The boycotting members were suspended by the party and they broke off and reconstituted the CPN (Marxist–Leninist) citing their opposition to the treaty and their unfair treatment within the party. He was reelected again in the 1999 election from Jhapa 2 and Jhapa 6, the latter of which he vacated. In the party's seventh congress in February 2003, Oli put forth a proposal to democratize the party structure and proposed a structure with a chairman and a general secretary. After he was outnumbered in the congress, he withdrew his proposal.

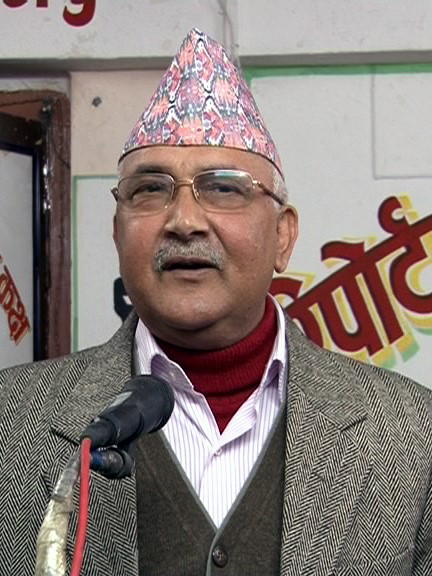
Oli in 2011

Following the royal coup by King Gyanendra in 2005, he was put under house arrest. Following the 2006 revolution, Oli was appointed as deputy prime minister and foreign minister in Girija Prasad Koirala's interim cabinet. He was also made chair of a cabinet committee to implement the High Level Probe Commission report which investigated abuses of state power and funds since the royal coup. Oli lost in the 2008 Constituent Assembly election in Jhapa 7. At the party's eighth general convention in 2009, his previous proposal for organizational changes was accepted. He was also reelected to the central committee by the congress but lost his bid for party chair to Jhala Nath Khanal.

== Premiership (2015–2025) ==
In the 2013 Constituent Assembly election, Oli was elected from Jhapa 7. He also became the parliamentary party leader, defeating Khanal in the contest. Oli again challenged for the party leadership at the ninth general convention in July 2015. He defeated former general secretary Madhav Kumar Nepal and was elected as party chair.

=== First term (October 2015–July 2016) ===
Following the promulgation of the new constitution, Oli was elected as Prime Minister in a parliamentary vote on 11 October 2015, receiving 338 votes out of 597 members in the Legislature Parliament. His candidacy was supported by the UCPN (Maoist), Rastriya Prajatantra Party Nepal, Madheshi Jana Adhikar Forum, Nepal (Loktantrik) and 13 other small parties. He was sworn in on 12 October.

His appointment came at the time of protests in the southern plains demanding revisions to the constitution and a blockade imposed by India. Amid deteriorating relations with India, his cabinet recalled Nepal's ambassador to India, Dip Kumar Upadhaya following differences with the cabinet. On 20 March, he went on a state visit to China where the two countries signed trade and transit treaties.

He resigned on 24 July 2016, after losing the support of his coalition partners. The main coalition partner CPN (Maoist Centre) and the opposition Nepali Congress had registered a no-confidence motion against his government on 14 July 2016.

=== Second and third terms (February 2018–August 2021) ===
In the 2017 election, the alliance between the CPN (UML) and CPN (Maoist Centre) gained a majority in the House of Representatives. Oli was elected from Jhapa 5 with a majority of over 28,000 votes. He was unanimously elected as the leader of the parliamentary party on 15 February 2018.

He was appointed prime minister for a second time on 15 February 2018 with the support of CPN (Maoist Centre). He passed the floor test on 11 March with 208 of 268 votes in the 275-member House of Representatives. Following the merger of the two coalition partners to form the Nepal Communist Party, he became co-chair of the new party along with Pushpa Kamal Dahal.

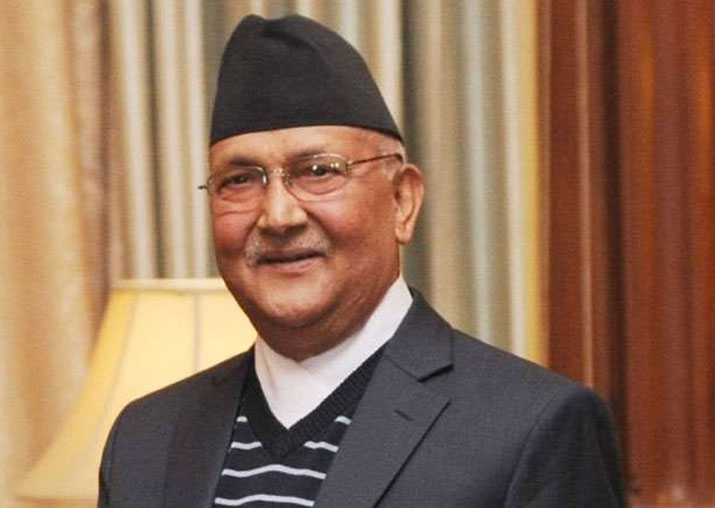
Oli in 2016

After pressure within the party from Madhav Kumar Nepal and other leaders to either give up the party leadership or the premiership, Dahal was made the executive head of the party. He reshuffled his cabinet on 22 November to manage factions within the party. His government also received criticism from leader within the party including Bhim Rawal for their agreement with the United States government for grants under the Millennium Challenge Corporation.

In February 2019, Oli claimed that the world is amazed by the supercomputer being built by Nepal. He was referring to a computer that was being built in the Banepa IT Park, which the makers had claimed to be a supercomputer in spite of its lacking computing power.

In August 2019, Oli claimed the English word rhinoceros should be replaced by the Nepali word for the animal, Gainda (Nepali: गैँडा, romanized: Gaim̐ḍā), and Mount Everest should be known as Sagarmatha (Nepali: सगरमाथा, romanized: Sagarmāthā) by everyone. He said, "...Do you know what [a] gaida [is]? You people know [a] gaida as [a] rhino. But rhinos are not rhinos, they are gaida. I request you to remember this word—gaida...".

His handling of the COVID-19 pandemic was criticized within the party. Party members were critical of an agreement with a private company in China to purchase medical equipment, and unbeknownst to cabinet members assigning the responsibility to purchase medical equipment to the Nepali Army. The government's late response in evacuating Nepalese citizens was also criticized. He also received criticism for suggesting that the rising number of coronavirus cases were from individuals breaking the lockdown, especially those sneaking into Nepal from India. He also claimed that the corona is similar to the flu and that one should sneeze and drink hot water to drive the virus away.

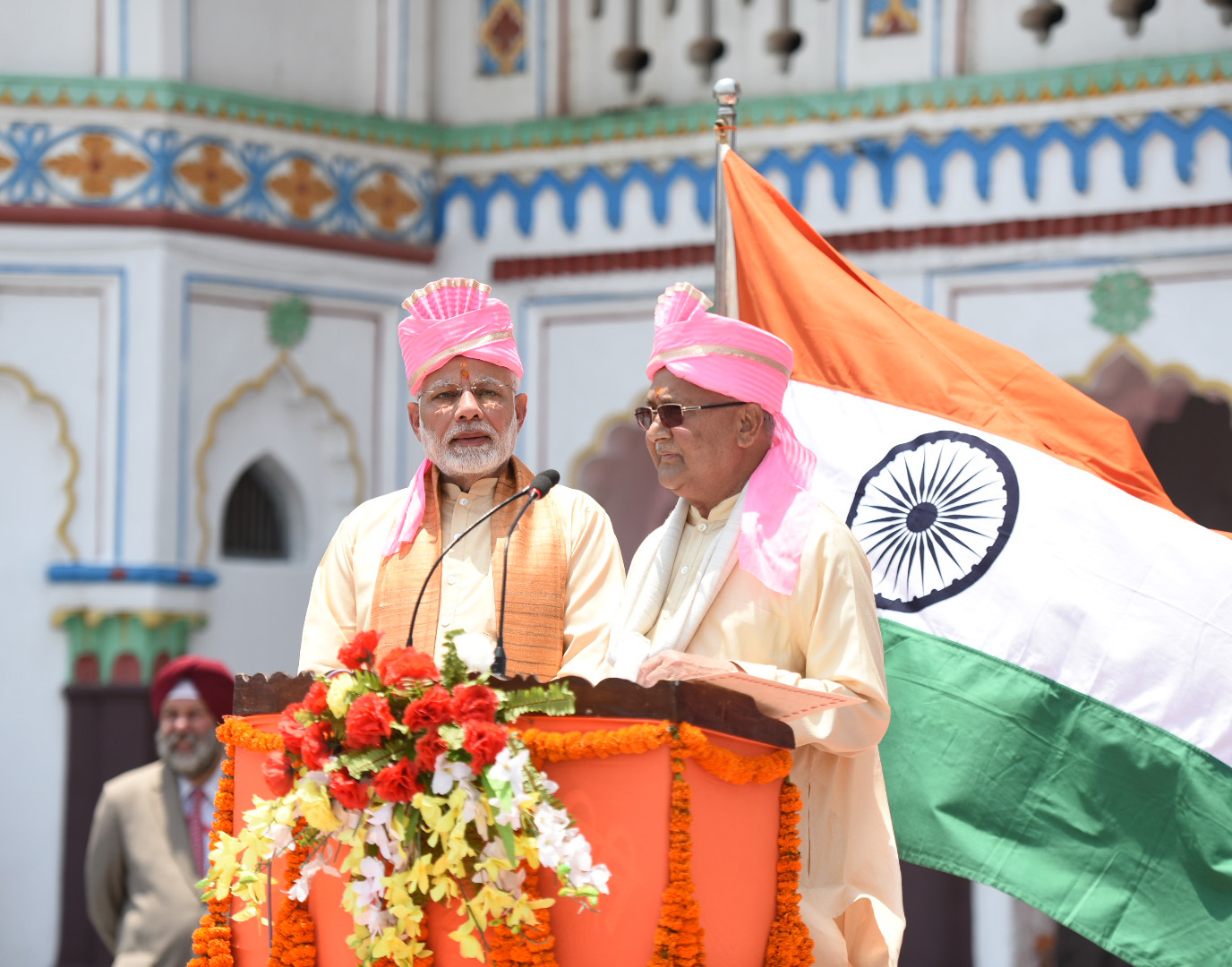
Oli and Indian Prime Minister Narendra Modi in Janakpur, Nepal, 11 May 2018

In May 2020, the Oli government unveiled new maps of the country including the disputed territories of Kalapani, Lipulekh and Limpiyadhura in response to the inauguration of a road across the Lipulekh Pass by India, which led to a "cartographic war" between the two countries. A constitutional amendment bill to amend the official map and emblem of the country passed unanimously.

Following calls within the party to resign, Oli reshuffled his cabinet again in October 2020 but was admonished for not consulting the party. Dahal presented a political document at a party secretariat meeting that accused K.P. Sharma Oli of not following the party's directions, unilaterally leading the government and turning a blind eye towards corruption. In response, Oli attacked Dahal for not letting him run the government, promoting factionalism and nepotism as well as not letting victims of the Nepalese Civil War get justice.

On 20 December 2020, K.P. Sharma Oli called on President Bidhya Devi Bhandari to dissolve the House of Representatives and call for fresh elections. In an address to the nation, Oli said he dissolved the house after the party had not let him work as prime minister and that a no-confidence motion was being prepared against him from within the party. The decision was met with criticism from within the party and seven ministers close to the Dahal–Nepal faction in his cabinet resigned in protest. On 23 February 2021, a constitutional bench led by Chief Justice Cholendra Shumsher JB Rana declared the dissolution unconstitutional, and reinstated the House to meet within 13 days. Oli respected the verdict and convened parliament on 7 March.

On 7 March 2021, the Supreme Court ruled to award the Nepal Communist Party to Rishiram Kattel after he challenged the Election Commission's ruling of providing the name of his party to the NCP formed after the 2018 merger. The verdict dissolved the ruling party jointly led by Oli and Dahal, reviving the former CPN (UML) and CPN (Maoist Centre) parties. This reduced Oli's government back to a coalition, exacerbating political tensions. The CPN (Maoist Centre) recalled its ministers on 13 March 2021 and withdrew its support from the Oli government on 5 May 2021, turning it into a minority government.

On 10 May 2021, Oli failed a vote of confidence with 93 of 232 in the House of Representatives, 43 below the 136 majority. He then became a minority Prime Minister on 13 May 2021, when no opposition party formed a majority or claimed it in time. A cabinet meeting chaired by Oli recommended the president to dissolve the House of Representatives on 22 May 2021 after members of his party led by former prime ministers Madhav Kumar Nepal and Jhala Nath Khanal supported Nepali Congress leader Sher Bahadur Deuba as the next prime minister. On 12 July 2021, the constitutional bench of the Supreme Court formed to hear the opposition's writs against the dissolution. It declared the dissolution unconstitutional and ordered the appointment of Deuba as prime minister within 28 hours. After Nepal and Khanal were suspended by the party for disobeying party orders the party split in August the former party leaders forming the Communist Party of Nepal (Unified Socialist). Oli was re-elected party chair in the 10th general convention of the CPN (UML) in November 2021 defeating Bhim Rawal in the leadership election.

=== Fourth term (July 2024–September 2025) ===
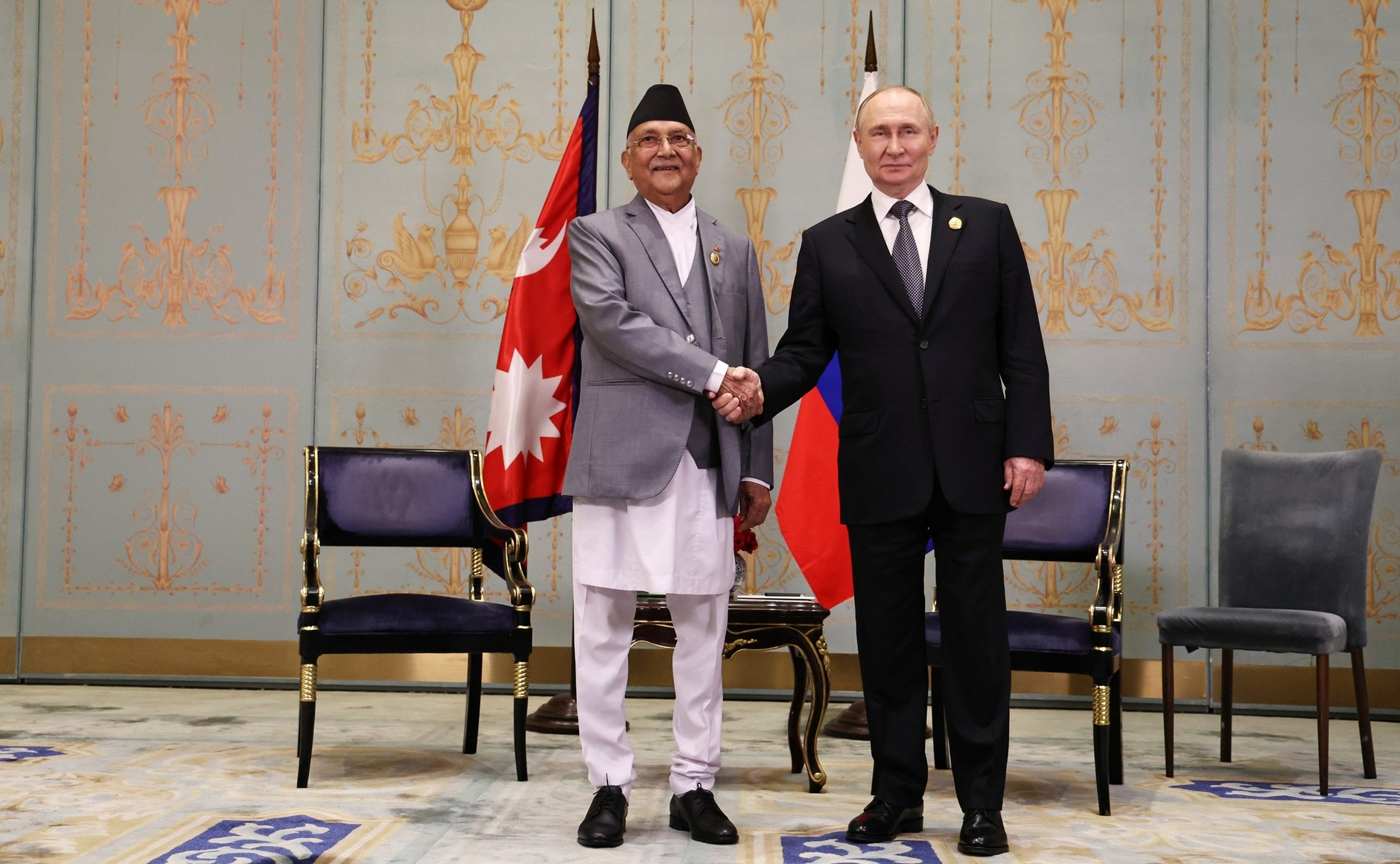
Oli and Russian President Vladimir Putin at the 2025 Tianjin SCO summit in China, 1 September 2025

In the 2022 general election, his party became the second-largest party in the House of Representatives. Oli was reelected from Jhapa 5 with a majority of over 29,000 votes. After power-sharing talks broke down inside the ruling alliance, Oli and Dahal brokered a deal, backing Dahal's bid as prime minister. The UML withdrew from the coalition government ahead of the presidential election in March 2023, but joined hands with Dahal again in March 2024.

Following disagreements with the prime minister and other coalition partners about the annual budget and citing the need for a stable government of national consensus, Oli and Nepali Congress' Deuba agreed on 1 July 2024 to form a rotational government with the two party chairs serving equal time as prime minister. CPN (UML) withdrew its support from the Dahal government, and following a failed a motion of confidence for Dahal in the House on 12 July, Oli was appointed prime minister for a fourth stint on 14 July as part of a coalition with the Nepali Congress, and sworn in the following day.

=== Resignation ===
After widespread protests that started after a government-imposed social media ban and as part of the wider movement against corruption, Oli resigned as prime minister on 9 September 2025. He along with other ministers sought shelter at an army barrack in Shivapuri.

== Post-premiership ==
In the 5 March 2026 general election, Oli was defeated in the Jhapa-5 consitutency by Balen Shah, who won 68,348 votes to Oli's 18,734. On March 28, Oli was arrested for his alleged role in the crackdown of the 2025 Gen Z protests.

=== 2026 general election ===
In the 2026 Nepalese general election, K. P. Sharma Oli, leader of the Communist Party of Nepal (Unified Marxist–Leninist) and a former Prime Minister, contested the Jhapa-5 constituency, which he had represented for many years. He faced a high-profile challenge from Balen Shah, the Rastriya Swatantra Party's prime ministerial candidate, in one of the election's most closely watched contests.

The election ended in a decisive defeat for Oli. Shah won 68,348 votes, while Oli received 18,734 votes, ending Oli's long hold on the constituency. The result was widely seen as a symbol of Nepal's changing political landscape, reflecting growing public support for newer political figures and reform-oriented parties following the political unrest of 2025.

=== Arrest and trial ===
Following his defeat in the 2026 general election, K. P. Sharma Oli was arrested on 28 March 2026 in connection with the deaths of 76 people during the violent suppression of the September 2025 Gen Z anti-corruption protests. Authorities also arrested former Home Minister Ramesh Lekhak after a judicial inquiry recommended that both men face prosecution for alleged negligence in their handling of the police response.

Oli was taken into custody at his residence in Kathmandu. His supporters protested the arrest, describing it as politically motivated, while the new government stated that the investigation was intended to ensure accountability for the deadly crackdown. In April 2026, the Supreme Court ordered Oli's release pending further legal proceedings.

== Political positions ==
Oli credits his distant uncle Ramnath Dahal for his communist beliefs. As a student in Jhapa at the time, he was influenced by the Naxalite insurgency in West Bengal, India. He had not studied Marxism but had followed the line of Cultural Revolution in his earlier days. He later claimed that it was a "mistaken path".

Oli was regularly in conflict with "hardliners" that advocated for armed struggle against the Panchayat administration. He has been critical of the Maoists for the loss of life during the Civil War.

=== Relations with India ===
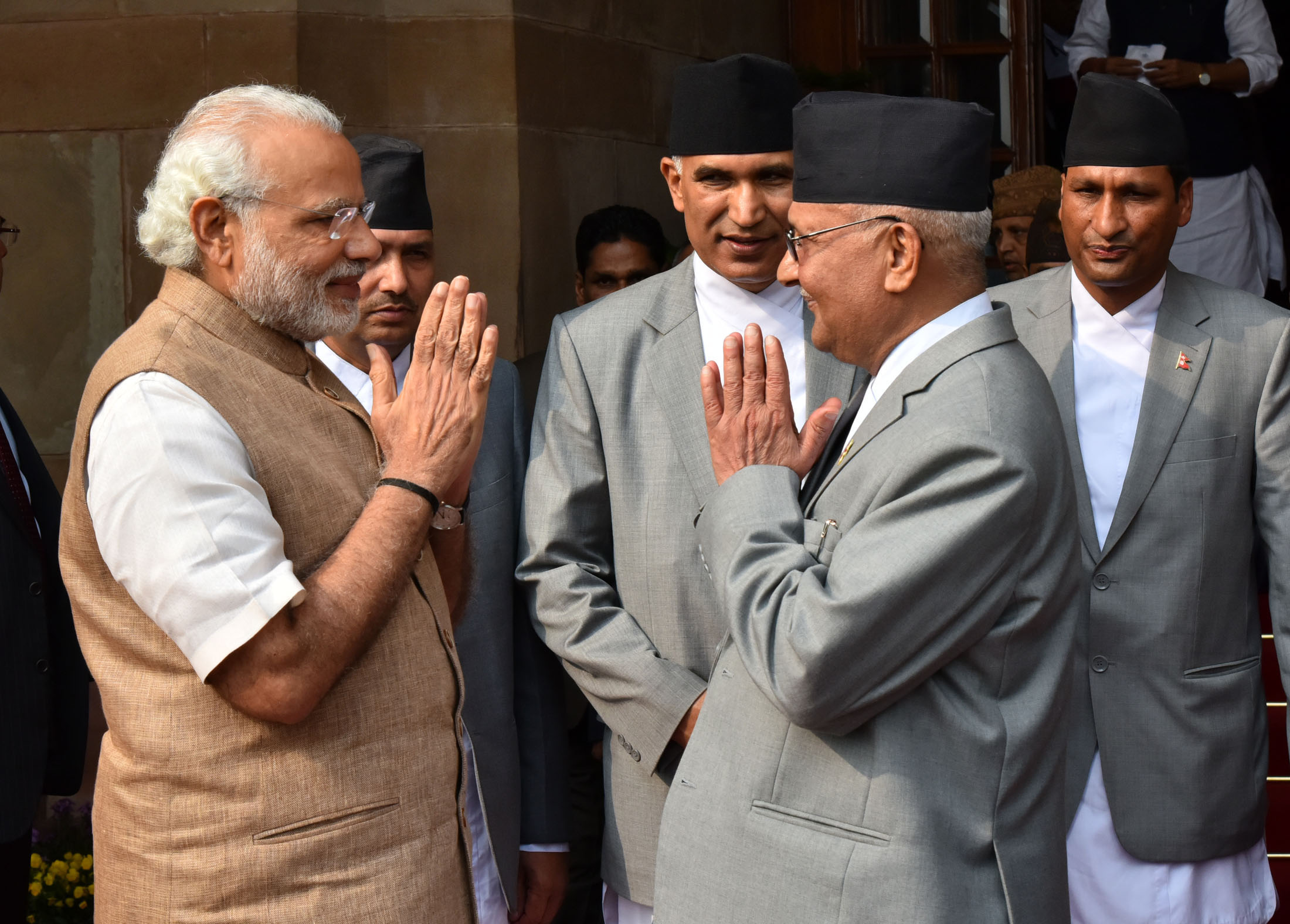
Oli and Indian Prime Minister Narendra Modi in New Delhi, India, 20 February 2016

While organizing the Jhapa rebellion, organizers hired two Naxalite guerrillas to train their members. Oli supported Mohan Chandra Adhikari's opinion that their presence was part of India's imperialist ambitions in the region.

Oli played an important role in getting parliamentary support for the Mahakali treaty that was to be signed with India. The treaty was a reason cited for causing a split in the party and it led to Oli being seen as a pro-India leader.

During his first tenure in 2015, he pushed for closer ties with China following the blockade by India. In his second tenure his government brought in amendments to the constitution which added the disputed territories of Kalapani, Lipulekh and Limpiyadhura to the official map of the country in response to the inauguration of a road across Lipulekh by India.

During the COVID-19 pandemic in Nepal, Oli had lashed out at India, saying that the "Indian virus" was more dangerous than the "Chinese or Italian virus" and made light of the Indian national emblem. He said this during an address to the parliament where he blamed the rising number of coronavirus cases on individuals violating the nationwide lockdown, especially those sneaking into Nepal from India, claiming that "people coming from India through illegal channels are spreading the virus in the country.", which sparked a round of media attention in India.

While addressing a function celebrating the 207th birth anniversary of poet Bhanubhakta Acharya on July 2020, Oli said Lord Rama was born in Nepal and India had created a fake Ayodhya. He claimed Thori, a place near Birgunj in southern Nepal, to be the birthplace of Rama and it was impossible for Rama to reach Janakpur in eastern Nepal to marry Sita from Ayodhya in India. He later launched an investigation into this matter, asking officials in the region to research the whereabouts of Ayodhyapuri. He also claimed to have found strong evidences of the real Ayodhya, supposedly including the ruins of Someshwar Gadhi and Valmiki Ashram, both of whom are associated with Lord Rama.

On the occasion of International Day of Yoga on 21 June 2021, Oli claimed that yoga originated in Uttarakhand and Nepal in particular. According to him, India as a country did not exist at the time when yogic science was founded. This caused backlash from Nepali and Indian social media.

=== Federalism and Republicanism ===
After the dissolution of the parliament in 2003, there were claims from some that Oli had dealings with the palace . He had commented that turning Nepal into a republic would be like "making for America in a bullock cart". Oli also defied party whip and was not present when the interim legislature declared Nepal as a republic.

Oli has been seen as favoring centralization. During his second term as prime minister he centralized more executive power into his post. He has also been seen as unwilling to let provincial and local governments function autonomously.

== Electoral history ==
Election	House	Constituency	Party	Votes	Result
1991	House of Representatives	Jhapa 6	CPN (UML)	21,049	Elected
1994	House of Representatives	Jhapa 6	CPN (UML)	18,861	Elected
1999	House of Representatives	Jhapa 6	CPN (UML)	23,749	Elected
1999	House of Representatives	Jhapa 2	CPN (UML)	18,909	Vacated
2008	Constituent Assembly	Jhapa 7	CPN (UML)	14,959	Lost
2013	Constituent Assembly	Jhapa 7	CPN (UML)	19,287	Elected
2017	House of Representatives	Jhapa 5	CPN (UML)	57,139	Elected
2022	House of Representatives	Jhapa 5	CPN (UML)	52,319	Elected
2026	House of Representatives	Jhapa 5	CPN (UML)	18,734	Lost

== Personal life ==
Oli is married to Radhika Shakya. He met Shakya in 1987 at an event organized by CPN (Marxist–Leninist) for recently released political prisoners in Pulchowk Campus. She was working as a temporary worker for Nepal Rastra Bank at the time, while studying at Patan Campus. Later that year, the two married in a ceremony attended by 20 people.

He currently resides in Balkot, Bhaktapur but also has a residence in Damak, Jhapa.

=== Health issues ===
During his imprisonment, Oli contracted tuberculosis and he was also suffering from gastric ulcer. At the time of release, he was described to be extremely scrawny. After the 1990 revolution he developed problems in his kidneys. He underwent a kidney transplant in Apollo Hospital, New Delhi in 2007 and had a second transplant in Tribhuvan University Teaching Hospital, Kathmandu in 2020. He was admitted to intensive care where he underwent dialysis for renal disease in November 2019.

== Bibliography ==
- Selected speeches of K P Sharma Oli. Kathmandu: Central Office, Communist Party of Nepal – UML. 2016.

== Notes ==
House of Representatives of Nepal
New constituency	Member of Parliament for Jhapa 6; 1991–1999	Succeeded by Gopal Prasad Koirala
Preceded by C. P. Mainali	Member of Parliament for Jhapa 2; 1999–2008	Succeeded by Gauri Shankar Khadka as Member of the Constituent Assembly
Preceded by Keshav Kumar Budhathoki	Member of Parliament for Jhapa 5; 2018–2025	Succeeded by Balen Shah
Political offices
Preceded by Sher Bahadur Deuba	Minister of Home Affairs; 1994–1995	Succeeded by Khum Bahadur Khadka
Preceded by Ramesh Nath Pandey	Minister of Foreign Affairs; 2006–2007	Succeeded by Sahana Pradhan
Preceded by Sushil Koirala	Prime Minister of Nepal; 2015–2016	Succeeded by Pushpa Kamal Dahal
Preceded by Sher Bahadur Deuba	Prime Minister of Nepal; 2018–2021	Succeeded by Sher Bahadur Deuba
Preceded by Pushpa Kamal Dahal	Prime Minister of Nepal; 2024–2025	Succeeded by Sushila Karki
2nd Nepalese Constituent Assembly
Preceded by Bishwodip Lingden Limbu	Member of the Constituent Assembly for Jhapa 7; 2014–2017	Constituency abolished
Party political offices
Preceded by Jhala Nath Khanal	Leader of the Communist Party of Nepal (UML); 2014–2018	Party dissolved
New political party	Leader of the Nepal Communist Party (NCP); 2018–2021	Party dissolved
Party re-established	Leader of the Communist Party of Nepal (UML); 2021–present	Incumbent
