= Rebel Unity Centre =

The Rebel Unity Centre (Nepali: विद्रोही एकता केन्द्र) was a communist grouping in Nepal, formed after Rishi Devkota (Azad) split away from the Communist Party of Nepal (Fourth Convention) in 1980. In November 1981, the group merged into the Communist Party of Nepal (Marxist-Leninist).

== See also ==
- List of communist parties in Nepal
