= Iwa, Nepal =

Iwa ईवा
- Village
- Location in Nepal
- Coordinates: 27.19°N 87.51°E
- Country: Nepal
- Province: Koshi Province
- District: Tehrathum District
- Time zone: UTC+5:45 (Nepal Time)

Iwa is a village in the Himalayas in the Tehrathum District in the Koshi Province of eastern Nepal.

== Notable people ==
- K. P. Sharma Oli, former prime minister of Nepal
