= Nepali National Congress =

Former Political party in Nepal

Nepali National Congress नेपाल राष्ट्रिय काङ्ग्रेस
- President: Tanka Prasad Acharya
- General Secretary: Krishna Prasad Bhattarai
- Acting-president: B. P. Koirala
- Founder: Matrika Prasad Koirala
- Founded: 25 January 1946
- Dissolved: 9 April 1950
- Succeeded by: Nepali Congress
- Headquarters: Kathmandu District, Nepal
- Ideology: Social democracy

Nepali National Congress (Nepali: नेपाली राष्ट्रिय काँग्रेस) was a political party in Nepal that was founded in 1947. The party was founded to protest the Rana rule in Nepal. Dilli Raman Regmi, B. P. Koirala, Matrika Prasad Koirala, Ganesh Man Singh, Krishna Prasad Bhattarai, Mahendra Narayan Nidhi were founding members of the party.

The party merged with Nepal Democratic Congress on 9 April 1950 to form the Nepali Congress. A faction of the party led by Dilli Raman Regmi continued to operate until 1960 when political parties were banned under the Panchayat rule in Nepal.

== History ==
During the Rana rule in Nepal, all opposition activities were heavily scrutinized by the government. A major centre for political exiles during this time was Benaras, Benaras also had a significant population of Nepalese expatriates and students. A mass political party had been organized among the Nepalese population in Benaras by October 1946 by the name of All India Nepali National Congress. The ad-hoc committee of the party included president Devi Prasad Sapkota, vice-president Balchandra Sharma, general secretary Krishna Prasad Bhattarai and publicity minister Gopal Prasad Bhattarai. B.P. Koirala was the coordinator of the Central Working Committee of the party which included Batuk Prasad Bhattarai, Narayan Prasad Bhattarai and Narendra Regmi.

Around the same time in Kolkata, another popular destination for the Nepalese diaspora, a separate organisation by the name of All India Nepali Gorkha Congress was formed whose chairman was Dharma Narayan Pradhan. B.P. Koirala during this time traveled to Kolkata, Darjeeling, Assam, Bhagsu and Dehradun which had a significant population of Nepalese exiles. There he established contacts with pro-democracy activists like Ganesh Man Singh and the Gorkha Congress.

In January 1947, in a mass session organized by Nepalese pro-democracy activists in Kolkata, the two parties merged and under the name Nepali National Congress. The session elected imprisoned democracy activist Tanka Prasad Acharya as the party chairman and B.P. Koirala was made acting president of the party. The major four proposals passed by the session were to assist Indians in their independence movement, support Vietnam struggling for freedom against French colonization, ask for the immediate release of imprisoned members of the Nepal Praja Parishad, and initiate a satyagraha in Nepal for the establishment of a democratic system. The organization's modus operandi was chosen, and attached itself to the civil conscience process in Nepal by establishing Tanka Prasad Acharya as its chairman.

=== Jute Mill Strike ===
Soon after the party's formation, it had participated in the Biratnagar Jute Mill Strike. The labor strike which started in March 1947 quickly turned into a demonstration against the Rana regime. Koirala along with his brother Girija Prasad who had joined the strikers were arrested and brought to Kathmandu. Matrika Prasad Koirala was elected as interim president after Koirala's arrest to conduct a satyagraha campaign against the Rana regime. The call was met with protests across major cities in the country including the capital Kathmandu. On 16 May 1947, after weeks of protests prime minister Padma Shumsher announced sweeping administrative reforms and released political prisoners.

The general conference of the party in July 1947 elected Dilli Raman Regmi interim president and Prem Bahadur Kansakar as general secretary. B.P. Koirala was not amongst those released but under pressure from the Indian political leaders, he was released in August 1947. The unexpected release of Koirala caused a rift in the party with Regmi insisting that he should serve his term as acting president. When the rift could not be fixed the Regmi faction of the party broke off and launched a parallel party.

The 1948 Constitution was announced by Rana prime minister Padma Shamsher on 26 January with significant reforms to the administration of the country and was welcomed by the party as a step in the right direction. However in April of that year, Padma Shamsher went into exile resigned because of pressure within the Rana family to not implement the constitution. Moham Shamsher took over as prime minister and one of his first acts was to ban the Nepali National Congress throughout the country. The new constitution was supposed to come into effect from the Nepali New Year in April and to be fully operative within twelve months, but was not implemented by the new prime minister. B.P. Koirala was also arrested for a second time by the Rana government but was released in June 1949 following a threat of a nationwide satyagraha by the party. Matrika Prasad Koirala was elected as party president in a general convention in March 1949.

In March 1950, the party merged with the Nepal Democratic Congress to form the Nepali Congress while the Regmi faction continued its operation.

=== Transition era ===
The party was critical of the 1951 revolution since it violated the Gandhian philosophy of nonviolence which the party was committed to. During the last days of the revolution, Dilli Raman Regmi was invited by the Rana regime to organize an opposition party with the financial backing of Bijaya Shamsher who was the son of prime minister Mohan Shamsher.

During the rule of the Rana–Congress cabinet, the party launched a campaign of publicity attacks on Nepali Congress and Home Minister B.P. Koirala. Regmi was sentenced to six months in prison and faced a penalty of रु. 500 when once such attack made comments on a sub judice case. He was released on 19 December 1951 after he paid the fine. The party was also a member of the United Democratic Front along with some communist organisations. The front organised satyagrahas against the government's handling of the Security Act and also demanded for the release of Kunwar Indrajit Singh and other political prisoners.

The party opposed the formation of an all Nepali Congress government following the fall of the Rana–Congress cabinet in November 1951. The party along with Nepal Praja Parishad called for the formation of a national unity government. In May 1952, Regmi expelled four members of the Working Committee including Rishikesh Shah, who then launched a dissident party and announced the expulsion of Regmi alleging hom of violating the party constitution. The dissident faction eventually merged with Bhadrakali Mishra's faction of Nepali Congress and formed the All-Nepal Jana Congress.

The party was a member of the League of Democrats formed in September 1953 against the Matrika Prasad Koirala cabinet by opposition parties. The league was short-lived however and in February 1954 the party joined the cabinet with party president Dilli Raman Regmi serving as a minister for education, foreign affairs, health and local self-government. In April 1954, King Tribhuwan announced the formation of an Advisory Assembly with 7 ministers and 106 nominated members. All political parties were granted representation in the assembly and Nepali National Congress received 8 seats. The assembly however was boycotted by the party because of the over representation of Rastriya Praja Party.

On 8 May 1955, King Mahendra had called upon a conference of political, social and cultural organization at the royal palace in order to establish a new political system but Nepali National Congress boycotted the meeting. The party along with Nepali Congress, Nepal Praja Parishad and Rastriya Praja Party called upon the king to set up a new cabinet as soon as possible. The parties were then involved in a series of negotiations with the king and Tanka Prasad Acharya of the Nepal Praja Parishad was appointed prime minister in January 1956 with the support of the political parties. Nepali National Congress however withdrew their support for Acharya by August 1956.

In March 1957 independents Khadga Man Singh, Dharma Ratna Yami and dissidents from the Nepali Congress Kedar Man Vyathit, Purna Bahadur Manav joined the party. In July 1957, the party along with Nepali Congress and Nepal Praja Parishad offered to form a coalition government in order to forestall Kunwar Indrajit Singh's appointment as prime minister, which was ignored by King Mahendra. The party was widely critical of the K.I. Singh cabinet, and questioned whether their administration would hold elections in the country. After it was announced that the elections were postponed the United Democratic Front launched by Nepali National Congress, Nepali Congress and Nepal Praja Parishad announced plans for a civil-disobedience movement starting in December of that year. In a conference held by King Mahendra the front proposed to hold an election within the next six months but since there was no royal proclamation from the king, they started with their movements. King Mahendra finally announced the date of the election on 15 December and the front stopped their protests, the party also endorsed the royal proposal but expressed hope that the parliament would serve as a constituent assembly as well.

=== 1959 elections ===
In the municipal elections of the Kathmandu Valley in January 1958, the front failed to gain a majority of seats in most of the local councils losing to Independents backed by the Communist Party of Nepal. King Mahendra called a meeting of five political parties in April 1958 to form a national unity government to hold the elections proposed for 1959 following which Dilli Raman Regmi joined the cabinet of Subarna Shamsher as Minister for Home Affairs.

The party nominated twenty candidates for the 1959 election and was two short of the Election Commission's qualification to be recognized as a national party. The party was assigned the umbrella as an election symbol. At the election, the party failed to gain any seats with party president Dilli Raman Regmi forfeiting his desposit for not getting one sixth of the vote. The party joined an alliance with Gorkha Parishad and Bhadrakali Mishra's faction of the Nepal Praja Parishad following the election.

After King Mahendra's coup in 1960, political leaders including Dilli Raman Regmi were arrested along with many party workers.

== Election results ==
=== National Assembly ===
Election	Leader	Votes	%	Seats	Position	Status
1959	Dilli Raman Regmi	12,707	0.7	0 / 109	9th	Extraparliamentary

== See also ==
- Nepali Congress
- Nepal Democratic Congress
- B. P. Koirala
