= Nepal Workers and Peasants Organisation (D.P. Singh) =

Nepal Workers and Peasants Organisation (Nepali: नेपाल मजदुर किसान संगठन) was a Nepalese communist group, led by D.P. Singh. It was formed when the Nepal Workers and Peasants Organisation of Hareram Sharma was divided into two (the other faction became the Nepal Front).

In 1986 the group merged into the Communist Party of Nepal (Marxist–Leninist). Singh would however break away from CPN(ML) soon thereafter, and form the Nepal Anti-Imperialist Front.

== See also ==
- List of communist parties in Nepal
