= Rishi Devkota =

Nepali politician

Personal details
- Party: Rebel Unity Centre

Rishi Devkota (Nepali: ऋषि देवकोटा), alias Azad (आजाद), was a Nepalese communist leader. He was a Central Committee member of the Communist Party of Nepal (Fourth Convention), but resigned from the party in 1980, accusing it of reformism and being soft on Soviet social imperialism. He formed a group known as the 'Rebel Unity Centre' around him. Devkota was captured by police in February 1981, and killed two days later in Bhiman, Sindhuli District.

Rishi Devkota was married to Goma Devkota, who was Member of Parliament for a period.

== Book ==
In 2003 Nara Bahadur Karmacharya released a book titled Murder of Ajad: undeclared death penalty, a publication dealing with the killing of Rishi Devkota.
