= Nepal Red Communist Party =

Nepal Red Communist Party (Nepali: नेपाल लाल कम्युनिष्ट पार्टी) was a communist party in Nepal. It was led by Ganga Lal Shrestha. The party grew out of the Communist League, which had been founded in Kathmandu in 1946. Ganga Lal Shrestha had contacts with the Communist Party of India, and had met with P. C. Joshi.

The party sent a delegation, consisting of Manik Lal Shrestha and Badri Prasad Shrestha, to the second congress of the Communist Party of Nepal in 1957. The Nepal Red Communist Party had hopes for a unification with CPN, but due to the split inside CPN the issue of unity with the Red Communist Party was not raised in the congress sessions. The Red Communist Party delegation withdrew from the congress, and did not participate in the last day of the congress.

== See also ==
- List of communist parties in Nepal
