= Nepali Congress (Subarna) =

- Founded: 1978
- Headquarters: Kathmandu

Nepali Congress (Subarna) is a political party in Nepal. The party was formed in 1978, through a split in the Nepali Congress. At the time of the split, the Nepali Congress (Subarna) was led by Bakhan Singh Gurung and Surya Prasad Upadhyaya. The party was initially known as the '38 group'.

The party contested the 1981 Rastriya Panchayat election, launching 36 candidates as 'independents'. Four of its candidates were elected, Dr. K.I. Singh, Bakhan Singh Gurung, Kashi Nath Gautam and Bhagwat Yadav.

Bakhan Singh Gurung was the minister of land reform and law and justice.

== See also ==
- Nepali Congress
