= Revolutionary Left Wing =

Nepal political organization

The Revolutionary Left Wing (Nepali: रिवोल्यूशनरी लेफ्ट विंग) was a communist political organisation in Nepal. The Revolutionary Left Wing was a splinter group of the Unified Communist Party of Nepal (Maoist). At the time of its founding on September 9, 2008, the organization issued a list of eleven key political demands. The group considered that the Maoist party had deviated from communist ideology and the struggle for a People's Republic. A 15-member executive committee of the organization was formed. Krishna Adhikari, who had left the Maoist party after the signing of the November 2005 twelve-point agreement, was the coordinator of the organization.

In December 2008 the organization announced the formation of a 'Red Force', to combat what it called the 'white terror' of the Youth Force (of CPN(UML)) and the Maoist Young Communist League, Nepal.

== See also ==
- List of communist parties in Nepal
