= Proletarian Revolutionary Organisation, Nepal =

Nepalese communist organisation

The Communist Unity Contact Forum Nepal (Nepali: कम्युनिष्ट एकता सम्पर्क समिति नेपाल) was a Nepalese communist organisation. It was founded in July 1974 by communists who had developed differences with the Communist Party of Nepal (Pushpa Lal). The group was based in western Nepal and in exile in India. The organisation published Rato Jhanda ('Red Flag'). The ideology of the group was Marxism–Leninism-Mao Zedong Thought, and it worked for the creation of a militant and well-organised communist party. The group accused Manmohan Adhikari, Pushpa Lal Shrestha and Mohan Bikram Singh for factionalism.

The group was reorganised as the Proletarian Revolutionary Organisation, Nepal (Nepali: क्रान्तिकारी सर्वहारा सङ्घठन नेपाल) in 1976. In 1977 the group made a new analysis, and adopted the theory of Boddhisatva Maoism. It claimed that the thoughts of Buddha and Mao Zedong were proponents of the same line of thinking, and that it was necessary to add Buddhist thinking to Mao's doctrine in order to advance the revolutionary cause in the Nepalese context. Moreover, it claimed that Buddhism would be unable to receive nationwide respect in Nepal if Mao's thinking was not harmonized into the Buddhist thinking.

However, the concept of Bodhisattva Maoism was too difficult for many of the members of the organisation to digest. In 1978 internal dissent broke out inside the organisation, and the group would soon disappear from the political scene. The remainders of the group merged into the Nepal Workers Peasants Organisation.

== See also ==
- Buddhist socialism
- List of communist parties in Nepal
