= Mohan Chandra Adhikari =

Nepalese politician

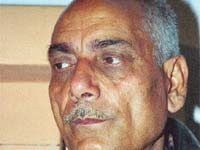

Personal details
- Party: CPN (UML)

Mohan Chandra Adhikari (Nepali: मोहनचन्द्र अधिकारी) is a former communist politician in Nepal. He is from a Brahmin family in Morang District. Adhikari studied B.A., but didn't appear in the final exams. Adhikari had been a follower of Pushpa Lal Shrestha, but turned more radical than his mentor. Adhikari became a leader of the group in the Jhapa District Committee of the Communist Party which in the early 1970s intended to initiate a rebellion on the lines of the Naxalite insurgency in India.

Adhikari was arrested and sentenced to life imprisonment. He was saved from death sentence through a royal pardon. Whilst in jail, he was associated with the Communist Party of Nepal (Marxist-Leninist). Adhikari would spend 17 years in prison. He was sometimes called the 'Nelson Mandela' of Nepal.

After being released from jail, Adhikari became an advisory-member of the Communist Party of Nepal (Unified Marxist-Leninist). He also represented the party in the Upper House of Parliament. He was arrested during the 2006 Loktantra Andolan.

Adhikari later broke with communism, and became a Hindu leader. After the declaration of Nepal as a secular state, Adhikari participated in a meeting organised by the Shivsena Nepal.

== Awards ==
- Maha Ujwaol Rastradeep awards from the President of Nepal on 2021
