= Ruplal Bishvakarma =

Nepalese politician

Ruplal Bishvakarma (रूपलाल विश्वकर्मा) was a Nepalese communist politician, peasant leader and Dalit activist. Ruplal hailed from a middle peasant family in the Chitwan district. Something of an oddity amongst Nepalese communist leaders.

Ruplal led the Kisan Samiti (Peasants Association), which fought against feudal landlords and agitated small farmers to seize crops from the landlords. Ruplal is credited with having introduced Pushpa Kamal Dahal (a.k.a. Prachanda) to militant politics in the 1970s.

In 1976 Ruplal's group took part in the formation of the Nepal Workers Peasants Organisation. When the NWPO split in 1983, Ruplal joined the NWPO faction led by Hareram Sharma. Soon, however he broke away from that organisation. Together with Proletarian Communist League he founded the Proletarian Workers Organisation, of which he became the leader.

During the 1990 popular uprising Ruplal's group took part in the far-left United National People's Movement. After the democratic opening, his faction merged with some of the other participants of the UNPM in forming the Communist Party of Nepal (Unity Centre).

When the CPN(UC) was ravaged by internal strife in 1994, Bishvakarma stood on the side of Nirmal Lama. Lama and Bishvakarma argued that the time was not ripe for the party to embark on an armed uprising. He was opposed by his former adept, Prachandra, who became the leading figure in the pro-armed struggle camp. The party was divided in two, with the radical wing led by Prachandra starting to mobilise for 'People's War'.

Ruplal later broke with CPN(UC), and formed his own Nepal Dalit Shramik Morcha, which took part in the 1999 election campaigning for rights for lower caste people.
