= Communist Party of Nepal (Marxist) (2006) =

Communist Party of Nepal (Marxist) नेपाल कम्युनिष्ट पार्टी (मार्क्सवादी)
- Secretary-General: Durga Prasad Gyawali
- Ideology: Communism; Marxism-Leninism

Election symbol

Communist Party of Nepal (Marxist) is a political party in Nepal. The party is registered with the Election Commission of Nepal ahead of the 2008 Constituent Assembly election.

Ahead of the 2008 Constituent Assembly election, the party presented a closed proportional representation list with 38 candidates, headed by Durga Prasad Gyawali. The party presented 4 candidates for the First Past the Post seats.

== See also ==
- List of communist parties in Nepal
