= Revolutionary Communist Organisation, Nepal =

Revolutionary Communist Organisation, Nepal (Nepali: क्रान्तिकारी कम्युनिष्ट सङ्गठन, नेपाल) was a communist faction in Nepal. The group operated in the Bagmati, Janakpur and Koshi zones. The group publish Vargyuddha (Class War).

In April 1980, the group merged into the Communist Party of Nepal (Marxist-Leninist).

== See also ==
- List of communist parties in Nepal

== Sources ==
- Rawal, Bhim Bahadur. Nepalma samyabadi andolan: udbhab ra vikas. Kathmandu: Pairavi Prakashan. p. 84, 163.
