= Revolutionary Communist Organising Committee =

Revolutionary Communist Organising Committee (Nepali: क्रान्तिकारी कम्युनिष्ट सङ्गठन समिति) was a communist group in Nepal. The organ of the group was Rato Jhanda (रातो झण्डा, Red Flag). The group was sometimes known as the Rato Jhanda group. The group had its origins in the faction led by Bharat Mohan Adhikari in the early 1970s, which was formed by a section of the Eastern Koshi Provincial Committee of the Communist Party of Nepal (which had practically separated itself from the mother party and functioned in an autonomous manner) and a small splinter section of the Gandaki-based Marxist-Leninist Revolutionary Communist Party. However, this tendency had been deserted by Bharat Mohan, when he joined the Central Nucleus. Before constituting itself as the Revolutionary Communist Organising Committee, the group was called the Red Flag District Committee (Rato Jhanda Zilla Samiti).

On September 11, 1978, the group merged into the All Nepal Communist Revolutionary Coordination Committee (Marxist-Leninist).

== See also ==
- List of communist parties in Nepal
