= Nepal Revolutionary Organisation (Marxist–Leninist) =

Nepal Revolutionary Organisation (Marxist–Leninist) (Nepali: नेपाल क्रान्तिकारी संगठन (मार्क्सवादी-लेनिनवादी)) was a communist organisation in Morang, Nepal. The group emerged around 1973, and was one of several local radical communist factions that surged in this period in Nepal. Madhav Kumar Nepal was the leader of the group.

In 1975 the group took part in the foundation of the All Nepal Communist Revolutionary Coordination Committee (Marxist-Leninist).

== See also ==
- List of communist parties in Nepal
