= Nepal Democratic Congress =

Former Political party in Nepal

Nepal Democratic Congress नेपाल प्रजातान्त्रिक कांग्रेस
- President: Mahendra Bikram Shah
- General Secretary: Surya Prasad Upadhyaya
- Founder: Subarna Shamsher Rana and others
- Founded: 4 August 1948
- Dissolved: 9 April 1950
- Succeeded by: Nepali Congress
- Headquarters: Calcutta, India
- Ideology: Social democracy

The Nepal Democratic Congress (Nepali: नेपाल प्रजातान्त्रिक कांग्रेस) was a political party in Nepal established in 1948 by Subarna Shamsher and Mahabir Shamsher.

The party merged with Nepali National Congress on 9 April 1950 to form the Nepali Congress.

== History ==
=== Background ===
In 1933, prime minister Juddha Shumsher removed the C-class Ranas from the roll of succession and banished them from Kathmandu. Among them were Hiranya Shumsher who was appointed as the Governor of Birgunj and Mahabir Shumsher who settled in Calcutta in India. Hiranya Shumsher's son Subarna was studying in Calcutta during the time of the purge. Mahabir found success as a businessman in Calcutta during the second world war and was joined by his cousin Subarna in Calcutta. Subarna established contacts with the political leaders of India and some influential Nepalese in Calcutta. Among them were Surya Prasad Upadhyaya and Rishikesh Shah. The two cousins also came in contact with the royal family when King Tribhuvan's sons Prince Himalaya and Prince Basundhara visited Calcutta in 1941.

After the appointment of prime minister Padma Shumsher in 1945, he invited his nephews Mahabir and Subarna back to Kathmandu and Subarna was appointed as an advisor. Subarna resigned from his position and went back to Calcutta less than a year later. In 1946, King Tribhuvan visited Calcutta for a medical check-up. Mahabir and Subarna were black-listed by the Rana regime and any contact with the king was forbidden, but with the help of Boris Lisanevich the three were able to meet in secret.

The Akhil Bharatiya Gorkha League was established in May 1945 with the goal of raising the sociopolitical consciousness of former Gurkhas in India. The league was active in other parts of India but was focused in North Bengal and Assam. In 1947, a wing of the party under the leadership of Purna Singh Khawas joined Subarna Shumsher in preparation for an armed struggle against the Rana regime.

=== Establishment ===
After the appointment of Mohan Shumsher as prime minister, the implementation of the 1948 Constitution was stopped and assets from some C-Class Ranas were confiscated. In June 1948, the Mukti Sena was formally established with Khawas as its chairman and Subarna as the financier. Subarna also convinced his nephew Thirbam Malla, the son of the King of Galkot and a captain in the Indian army to join the Mukti Sena. The Nepal Democratic Congress was founded in August 1948 with Mahendra Bikram Shah as the president and Surya Prasad Upadhyaya as general secretary in Kolkata with the financial backing of Subarna Shamsher, Mahabir Shamsher and other C-Class Ranas.

The party was based in Kolkata but branches were opened in Kathmandu and other border towns in Nepal. The head office was moved to Patna where Surya Prasad Upadhyaya resided. The first party convention was held in January 1949 in Guwahati, Assam. The party leadership and financial backers were Rana and so initially had limited appeal amongst the general public. Toran, Rudra and Kiran Shumsher were some influential C-class Ranas that had joined the party. Eventually the party attracted the support of people that were dissatisfied with factional politics in Nepali National Congress, Gorkha ex-servicemen and former members of the Indian Army. The party called for an armed struggle against the Rana regime and formed the core of the Mukti Sena. During the protests by Nepal Praja Panchayat in Kathmandu in the winter of 1948, the party ordered their followers in the Kathmandu Valley to join the protestors.

=== Unification ===
In 1947, Subarna and Mahabir met Nepali National Congress leader B.P. Koirala in Kolkata. The Nepali National Congress supported a Satyagraha against the Rana regime wheres Subarna and Mahabir were in support of an armed struggle. The two did not join the party but provided them with financial assistance. Later in 1949, the party president Shah and general secretary Upadhyaya met with Nepali National Congress leaders in Patna and proposed a unification of their two parties. The party merged with Nepali National Congress on 9 April 1950 with Nepali National Congress president Matrika Prasad Koirala appointed as president and Mahendra Bikram Shah as the general secretary of the unified Nepali Congress.

== See also ==
- Nepali Congress
- Nepali National Congress
- Subarna Shamsher Rana
