= Sandesh Samuha =

Nepalese communist organisation

Sandesh Samuha ('Sandesh Group') was a communist group in Nepal. It emerged as the Dang District Committee of the Communist Party of Nepal (Fourth Convention) separated itself from its mother party.

On December 12, 1978, the group merged into the All Nepal Communist Revolutionary Coordination Committee (Marxist-Leninist).

== See also ==
- List of communist parties in Nepal
