= Nepal Workers and Peasants Organisation (Hareram Sharma) =

Nepal Workers and Peasants Organisation (Nepali: नेपाल मजदुर किसान संगठन) was a communist group in Nepal, led by Hareram Sharma. It was one of the two separate NWPOs that emerged from the original NWPO (the other faction, led by Rohit, later became the Nepal Worker Peasant Party). The NWPO of Sharma held its party congress between October 22 and October 27, 1981,

The group was soon divided into two, the Nepal Workers and Peasants Organisation (D.P. Singh) and the Nepal Front (led by Hareram Sharma).

== See also ==
- List of communist parties in Nepal
