= Dilli Raman Regmi =

Nepalese historian and politician

- डिल्लीरमण रेग्मी
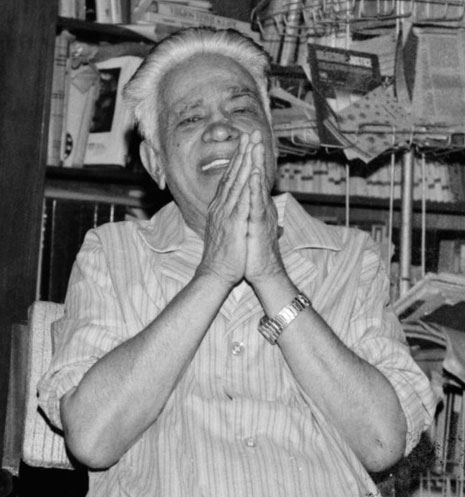

Personal details
- Born: 17 December 1913
- Died: 30 August 2001 (aged 87)

Dilli Raman Regmi (Nepali: डिल्लीरमण रेग्मी) (17 December 1913 – 30 August 2001) was a scholar, political figure, statesman and academician of Nepal. He dedicated his life to research, study, writing and politics. He was one of the driving forces behind creating Nepali Rastriya Congress party in 1946.

== Personal life ==
Regmi was born on 17 December 1913 to parents Rohini Raman Regmi and Mukti Devi Regmi in Kilagal, Kathmandu. He was first married to Kalyani Pandey (daughter of Shri Bishwa Raj Pandey (1883-1960, hereditary royal preceptor) and almost two decades after her death he married Kalyani's sister Nutan Pandey.

== Education ==
Renowned as a scholar, Dr. Dilli Raman Regmi completed his M.A. and M. Litt. degree in India. He completed his doctorate and got a Ph.D. degree in economics from Patna University in 1961. He also obtained a D. Litt. degree from the same university. He was also the first Nepalese to receive an honorary D.Sc. degree from the Soviet Union. He also taught for a short time in Kashi Bidhyapith in Banaras.

== Political career ==
Dilli Raman Regmi started his political life when working as a volunteer during the 1934 Nepal–Bihar earthquake. From 1940 Regmi became the political-in charge of a newly formed organization called Akhil Nepal Barga Mahasabha. The clarion call for a Republic Nepal came from Regmi in National Herald published from Lucknow. Regmi at this time had links with the organization of Subhas Chandra Bose. With many of his coded letters intercepted by the British and sent to the Ranas he could not enter Nepal, thus, he lived in exile in India from 1940. The Akhil Nepal Barga Mahasabha members including Regmi wrote prolifically in newspapers like Aaj (published from Banares) and New Herald (published from Lucknow). At the same time an underground revolution recruits were sought through its militant arm. Regmi was also accused by the British trying to work with the Japanese to do a revolt in Nepal. In this period Regmi came into contacts apart from Subash Chandra Bose with Indian leaders like Mahatma Gandhi, Jawaharlal Nehru, Dr. Rajendra Prasad and Rafi Ahmed Kidwai. The British in 1943 finally caught up with Regmi and put him in jail for participating in activities of All India Student's Federation and other movements for independence of India. In prison, communist leader Man Mohan Adhikari and other jailed activists used to take classes on Marxism from him. Whence out of jail Regmi took a non-violent stand. On January 26, 1947, Regmi inaugurated the first convention of the Nepali Rashtriya Congress in which B. P. Koirala was nominated as the acting president until election was held (with the nominated President of the party Tanka Prasad Acharya in jail in Kathmandu). In 1947 Regmi became the first elected working President (Karyakari Sabhapati) of the party (which many books have erroneously cited him as nominated president). At the time of the election B. P. Koirala was in jail. On his release he declared himself the acting President of the party. This led to the split of the party with one group Koirala faction and the other Regmi faction. In 1948 Koirala formed Nepali Congress Regmi continued as the President of Nepali National Congress. The Regmi group although smaller than the Koirala group had attracted many followers - among them being Pushpa Lal Shrestha who later started the first Communist Party of Nepal. Regmi was a follower of the Gandhian philosophy of no violence, he was one of the pioneers of the Democratic Movement in Nepal. He played a leading role in the restoration of democracy in Nepal through non-violence against the Rana Regime and later the party-less Panchayat system. After his return to Nepal following the overthrow of the Rana regime he became Nepal's education and foreign minister. His efforts led to the formalizing of ties with China Nepal's admittance to UNO and numerous other steps that integrated Nepal with the rest of the world and moved it out of isolation that it was under for more than a century under the Rana regime. As home minister of Nepal he organized Nepal's first democratic elections. It was a tough task as voter rolls had to be built and government machinery geared for a task it had never undertaken before.

== Academician ==
After the advent of Partyless Panchayat regime in Nepal Regmi started full-time working on history books on Nepal. Writing books was a hobby for Regmi but his contribution towards that field was equally remarkable as was his contribution to politics. It could not be wrong to say that Regmi introduced Nepal to the outside world through his multiple books. Regmi wrote history books under the name D. R. Regmi and all his books were written in English. It seems Regmi had started contributing research articles on Nepal to reputed journals at least by 1936. An entry of his name can be found in the "Journal of the Bihar Research Society", Volume 24, 1938 - "1936 - Pandit Dilliramanji, M.A., Dhokatola, Kathmandu, Nepal." He wrote multiple books on Nepal's ancient, medieval and modern history which were instrumental in introducing Nepal to the outside world. Some of his notable work are:

1. Nepal. 46 p. 1948
2. The Nepali Democratic Struggle. Nepali National Congress, 48 p. 1948.
3. A Century of Family Autocracy in Nepal. 326 p. 1950.
4. Wither Nepal. 181 p. 1952.
5. Ancient and Medieval Nepal. 178 p. 1952.
6. Ancient Nepal. xx
7. Medieval Nepal, Parts 1 -3. Calcutta: K.L. Mukhopadhyay, 1993 p. 1965.
8. Modern Nepal, Vol. 1. Calcutta: Firma K.L. Mukhopadhyay, 1993 p. 1965.
9. Medieval Nepal: Part 3, Vol. 2 Calcutta: K.L. Mukhopadhyay: 1966. 1076 p.
10. Medieval Nepal: Source materials for the history and culture of Nepal, 740-1768 A.D., inscription, chronicles and diaries, etc. . Calcutta: K.L. Mukhopadhyay. 1966.
11. Medieval Nepal, Part 4. Calcutta: K.L. Mukhopadhyay
12. Modern Nepal: Expansion: climax and fall. Firma K. L. Mukhopadhyay, 1975 ISBN 9780883864913
13. Inscriptions of Ancient Nepal New Delhi: Abhinav Publications. 1983 ISBN 978-0-391-02559-2
14. Modern Nepal Vol. I & 2. Rupa and Company. 1056 p. 2007 Reprint.

Dr. Dilli Raman Regmi was also a collector. He was interested in collecting rare items of archaeological and historical significance. His collection of books, old photos, and other items are preserved by the Dilli Raman Regmi-Kalyani Regmi Memorial Library Development Board and they are available for research and academic purposes.

In recent years, he has been in scrutiny for plagiarizing entire works of lesser known colleagues, translating it in English and claiming the original work as his own.

== Death ==
Dr. Dilli Raman Regmi died on August 30, 2001 [14th Bhadra, 2058 B.S.].
