= Madan Bhandari =

Nepalese politician (CPN-UML)

- मदन भण्डारी
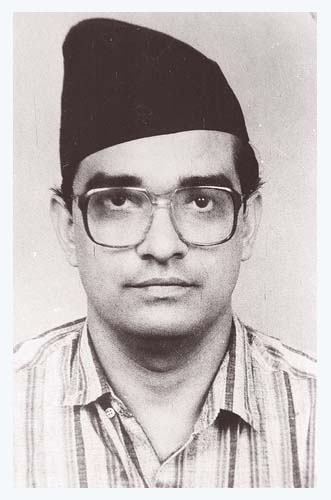
- Portrait of Madan Bhandari

General Secretary of CPN (UML)
- In office 6 January 1991 – 16 May 1993
- Preceded by: Party founded
- Succeeded by: Madhav Kumar Nepal

Member of Parliament, Pratinidhi Sabha
- In office 20 June 1991 – 16 May 1993
- Preceded by: Constituency created
- Succeeded by: Bidya Devi Bhandari
- Constituency: Kathmandu 1

Personal details
- Born: 27 June 1951 Dhungesaghu, Taplejung
- Died: 16 May 1993 (aged 41) Dasdhunga, Chitwan
- Cause of death: Possibly assassinated ( Car was in neutral while driver escaped .)
- Party: Communist Party of Nepal (Unified Marxist–Leninist)
- Spouse: Bidya Devi Bhandari
- Children: Usha Kiran Bhandari & Nisha Kusum Bhandari
- Parent(s): Chandra Kumar Bhandari & Devi Prasad Bhandari
- Education: Earned Master's degrees in Literature, Linguistics, and postgraduate courses in Oriental Philosophy from Banaras Hindu University
- Occupation: Former Member of Parliament
- Known for: जनताको बहुदलीय जनवाद "People's Multiparty Democracy"
- Awards: Nepal Ratna (2016)

Madan Kumar Bhandari (27 June 1951 – 17 May 1993) was a Nepalese political leader. He was elected as the Secretary General of the Communist Party of Nepal (Unified Marxist–Leninist), which fought for multiparty democracy and basic human rights in Nepal. His popularity soared after he defeated the incumbent Prime Minister Krishna Prasad Bhattarai in the 1991 general election. Known for his oratory and ability to connect with the people, Bhandari's most fundamental contribution was his thought, known as "People's Multiparty Democracy" (Nepali: जनताको बहुदलीय जनवाद). He is widely credited for advancing Nepal's communist movement to a much greater height together with playing a central role in the popular movement of 1990, which restored democracy and basic human rights in the Nepal after thirty years of the King's direct rule. He died in a jeep accident in Dasdhunga, Chitwan, in 1993.

== Life ==
Madan Bhandari was born in the Dhungesangu, Taplejung District in a Khas Brahmin family in eastern Nepal. He studied at Medibung School in Taplejung and in Varanasi, India. In 1972, he became a central committee member of the Janabadi Sanskritik Morcha (Democratic Cultural Front), a student movement established by Pushpa Lal Shrestha. Around 1976 he left Pushpa Lal's Communist Party of Nepal to create the Mukti Morcha Samuha ("Liberation Front Group"), which formed an alliance with the survivors of the Jhapa Movement in 1978. He was a founding member of the Communist Party of Nepal (Marxist-Leninist) preceding the 1980 referendum and was elected General-Secretary at its Fourth National Congress in 1986.

Bhandari was elected as the General-Secretary when his CPN (ML) merged with another Marxist group to become the Communist Party of Nepal (Unified Marxist-Leninist) in 1991. In the subsequent General Convention, he persuaded the party to adopt his theory of "People's Multiparty Democracy," breaking away from the orthodox militancy towards embracing inclusive and competitive democratic values. This innovation, one the one hand, led to the rise of CPN-UML as the strongest communist party in Nepal; and, on the other, gave a new democratic vision for the country as well as for the world communist movement.

== 1991 elections and aftermath ==
The CPN (UML) won all but one seat in the Himalayan capital in the 1991 elections, the country's first free election after more than three decades, ahead of which Bhandari emerged as a major leader of his party’s campaign. Bhandari proclaimed this "a vote for democracy," "a vote for independence" and "a vote for the alleviation of poverty." He argued for the popular vote as opposed to armed struggle as the main tactic for communists.

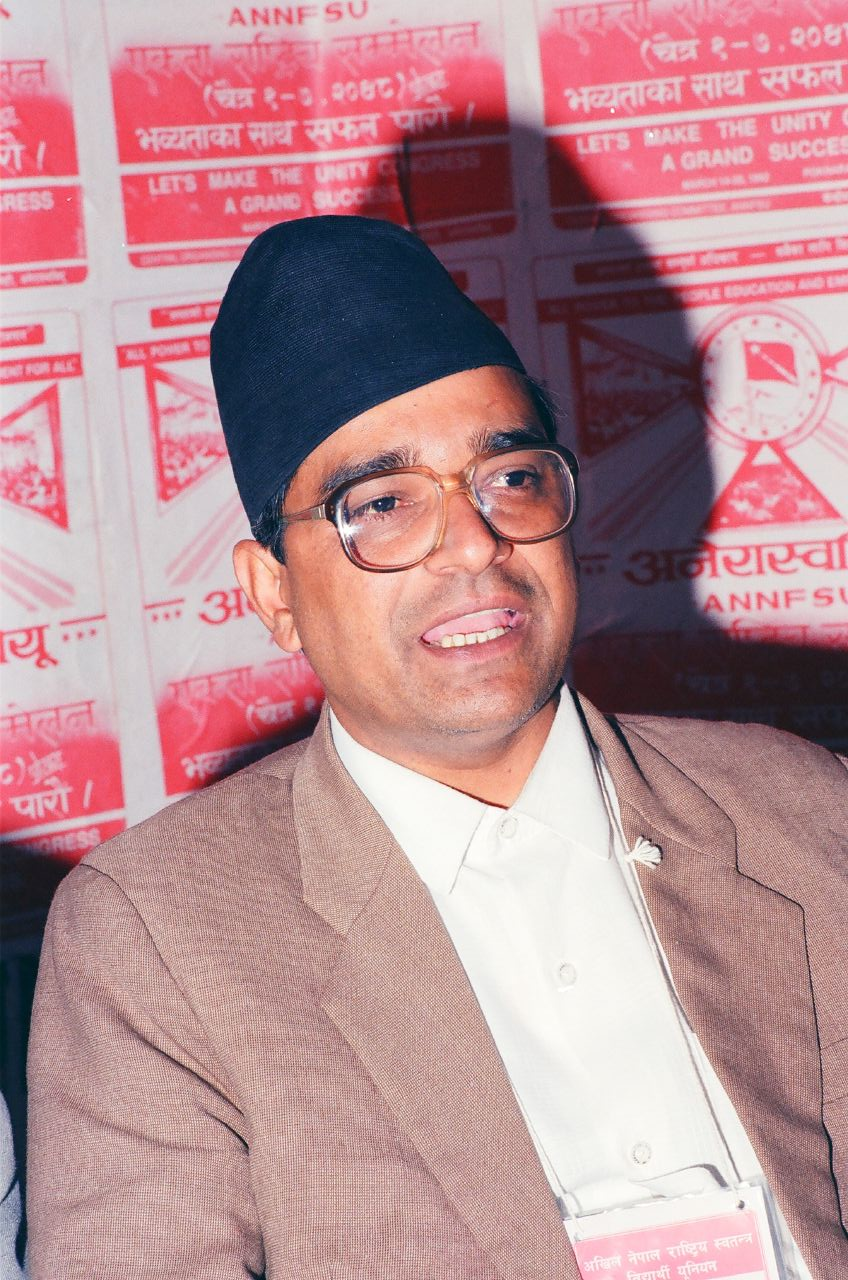
Bhandari in 1993

== Personal life ==
Bhandari married Bidya Devi Bhandari in 1982. Mrs. Bhandari at the time of her marriage was a prominent student leader. After the marriage, however, she preferred staying in the backgrounds since Madan Bhandari was in the top echelon of party leadership. Mrs. Bhandari reentered politics after her husband's death and was later elected for four terms as the Member of Parliament, oversaw major Cabinet portfolios and went on to become the first woman President of Nepal, remaining in the highest office for seven years and four months. The couple had two daughters, Usha Kiran Bhandari and Nisha Kusum Bhandari. Both daughters are married.

== Death ==
On 16 May 1993 Bhandari died in a car accident in Dasdhunga, Chitwan. According to an investigation led by K.P. Oli, it was not an accident but an unsolved murder. Of the three people inside the car, only the driver Amar Lama survived who was later abducted and killed by a group of unidentified gunmen in Kirtipur, Kathmandu; the two leaders Madan Bhandari and Jibaraj Ashrit died.

His body was recovered three days later and kept in Dasharath Rangashala, where people visited throughout the day and into the night to pay their respects. The only survivor of that crash, driver Amar Lama, was murdered 10 years later. A group of unidentified gunmen abducted Lama from the office of Tajakhabar Weekly tabloid around 13:45. He was taken to the hamlet of Kirtipur on the southwestern outskirts of the capital and shot. The assassins then fled towards Panga village.

== Aftermath ==
A bust has been built at the spot of the accident at Dasdhunga. The government of Nepal proposed to build Madan Bhandari Highway from Shantinagar of Jhapa district to Rupal of Dadheldhura district. In March 2018, Madan Bhandari Museum was inaugurated in Urlabari, Morang. The damaged jeep of the 1993 accident has been kept on display at the Urlabari Museum.

== Awards ==
- Nepal Ratna Man Padavi (28/05/2016). Posthumously awarded to Madan Bhandari by the then President of Nepal, Bidya Devi Bhandari.

== See also ==
- Dasdhunga
- List of unsolved murders (1980–1999)

Party political offices
Preceded by None	General Secretary of the Communist Party of Nepal (Marxist-Leninist); 1986–1991	Succeeded by Himself (as General Secretary of the CPN (UML))
Preceded by None	General Secretary of the Communist Party of Nepal (Unified Marxist-Leninist); 1991–1993	Succeeded by Madhav Kumar Nepal
