= Surya Prasad Upadhyaya =

Nepalese politician

- Born: 14 September 1907; Kathmandu
- Died: 30 July 1984 (aged 76); New Delhi India
- Other name: Suryababu
- Occupation: Political leader
- Known for: Establishment of Nepali Congress
- Political party: Nepali Congress (Subarna)

Surya Prasad Upadhyaya (14 September 1907 – 30 July 1984) was a Nepalese politician. Upadhyaya was a leader of the Nepal Democratic Congress, which merged with into the Nepali Congress in 1950.

He was born in Kathmandu on 14 September 1907.

Upadhyaya became Home and Law Minister in the Nepali Congress cabinet after the 1959 election. He led the Nepalese delegation at the 1959 UN General Assembly. During the December 1960 royal coup d'état, he was arrested along with B.P. Koirala and Ganesh Man Singh.

In 1978 he took part in a split in the Nepali Congress, and he and Bakhan Singh Gurung founded the Nepali Congress (Subarna).

He died in New Delhi on 30 July 1984.
