= Communist Party of Nepal (Pushpa Lal) =

Nepalese political party

Communist Party of Nepal (Pushpa Lal) नेपाल कम्युनिस्ट पार्टी (पुष्प लाल)
- Founder: Pushpa Lal Shrestha
- Founded: 1968
- Dissolved: 1987
- Split from: CPN (Amatya)
- Succeeded by: CPN (Marxist)
- Ideology: Communism; Marxism–Leninism
- Political position: Far-left

The Communist Party of Nepal (Pushpa Lal) was a communist splinter group led by Pushpa Lal Shrestha. The party emerged in 1968, as Pushpa Lal organized a separate party congress in Gorakhpur, India.

== History ==
After the 1962 convention of the radical communist sector, which constituted the separate Communist Party of Nepal, Pushpa Lal was supposed to have shared the leadership of the party together with Tulsi Lal Amatya. However, the cooperation between the two had broken down, and a large section of the party cadres followed Pushpa Lal in forming a new party. For a few years, Pushpa Lal's party was the major communist group in Nepal. The party was politically close to the Communist Party of India (Marxist) (CPI(M)). Pushpa Lal's party upheld the line of people's democracy. The organ of Pushpa Lal's party was Naya Janvad and the party headquarters were established in Varanasi, India. Pushpa Lal called for unity in action together with the Nepali Congress against the royal regime.

In 1971, a young party leader from Bhaktapur, Narayan Man Bijukchhe (alias Rohit), broke away from Pushpa Lal's party after the decision of the party to support the Indian intervention in East Pakistan. Bijukchhe also criticized the line of seeking cooperation with Nepali Congress and the failure of the party to condemn the Soviet Union as imperialist.

Rohit would form the Nepal Workers Peasants Organisation in 1975. In 1976, a prominent student leader of Pushpa Lal's party, Madan Kumar Bhandari, broke away and formed the Mukti Morcha Samuha. These splits contributed to diminishing influence of Pushpa Lal's party. Pushpa Lal Shestra died in 1978. His funeral became a mass manifestation of the political opposition. His widow, Sahana Pradhan, took over the leadership of the party.

Under Pradhan's leadership the party steered along a moderate course, endorsing Pushpa Lal's policy of cooperation with the Nepali Congress. The party worked alongside the Congress Party in the agitations against the Panchayat system in 1979, in the campaign for multiparty democracy ahead of the plebiscite of 1980 and mass protests against the royal government in 1985.

In 1987, the party merged with Communist Party of Nepal (Manmohan) and formed the Communist Party of Nepal (Marxist).

== See also ==
- List of communist parties in Nepal
