= Communist Party of Nepal (Manmohan) =

Communist Party of Nepal (Manmohan) नेपाल कम्युनिस्ट पार्टी (मनमोहन)
- Founder: Man Mohan Adhikari
- Founded: 1979 as CPN (Unity Conference)
- Dissolved: 1987
- Split from: CPN (Amatya)
- Succeeded by: CPN (Marxist)
- Ideology: Communism; Marxism–Leninism
- Political position: Far-left

The Communist Party of Nepal (Manmohan) was a communist party in Nepal led by Man Mohan Adhikari, an erstwhile leader of the radical faction of the Communist Party of Nepal (CPN) who had taken part in organising the Central Nucleus (an attempt to rebuild the CPN). Since the breakup of the Central Nucleus in 1973, he had led his own group of followers but it was not until 1979 that they constituted themselves as a separate party. Until 1982, the party was known as the Communist Party of Nepal (Unity Conference).

In 1986, the party merged with the Communist Party of Nepal (Pushpa Lal) and formed the Communist Party of Nepal (Marxist).

== See also ==
- List of communist parties in Nepal
