= Communist Party of Nepal (Marxist) (1986–1991) =

Former Political party in Nepal

Communist Party of Nepal (Marxist) नेपाल कम्युनिस्ट पार्टी (मार्क्सवादी)
- Founder: Man Mohan Adhikari; Sahana Pradhan
- Founded: 1987
- Dissolved: 1991
- Merger of: CPN (Manmohan); CPN (Pushpa Lal)
- Succeeded by: CPN (Unified ML)
- Ideology: Communism; Marxism–Leninism
- Political position: Far-left

The Communist Party of Nepal (Marxist) was a political party in Nepal. It was formed through the merger of the Communist Party of Nepal (Manmohan) led by Man Mohan Adhikari and the Communist Party of Nepal (Pushpa Lal) led by Sahana Pradhan in 1987. The Nepal Trade Union Centre was the trade union of CPN (Marxist) and Nepal Progressive Students Union was their students' union.

== History ==
The CPN (Marxist) was closely connected to the Communist Party of India (Marxist). The CPN (Marxist) was a member of the United Left Front and took part in the 1990 Nepalese revolution (Jana Andholan) to bring an end to the Panchayat government in 1990. The party merged with another constituent of the United Left Front, the Communist Party of Nepal (Marxist–Leninist) to form the Communist Party of Nepal (Unified Marxist–Leninist). A sizeable section of the old CPN (Marxist) leadership did however broke away from the CPN (UML) and reconstituted their own Communist Party of Nepal (Marxist).

== See also ==
- List of communist parties in Nepal

== See also ==
- History of Nepal
- Politics of Nepal
- List of political parties in Nepal
