= Mukti Morcha Samuha =

Nepalese communist organisation

Mukti Morcha Samuha (Nepali for 'Liberation Front Group') was an underground communist group in Nepal. Formed in 1976 following a split from the Communist Party of Nepal of Pushpa Lal Shrestha, it was led by student leader Madan Kumar Bhandari. Other leading figures in the group were Jibaraj Ashrit and Modanath Prasrit.

Mukti Morcha Samuha merged into the All Nepal Communist Revolutionary Coordination Committee (Marxist-Leninist) in 1977.
