= Sahana Pradhan =

Nepali politician

- सहाना प्रधान
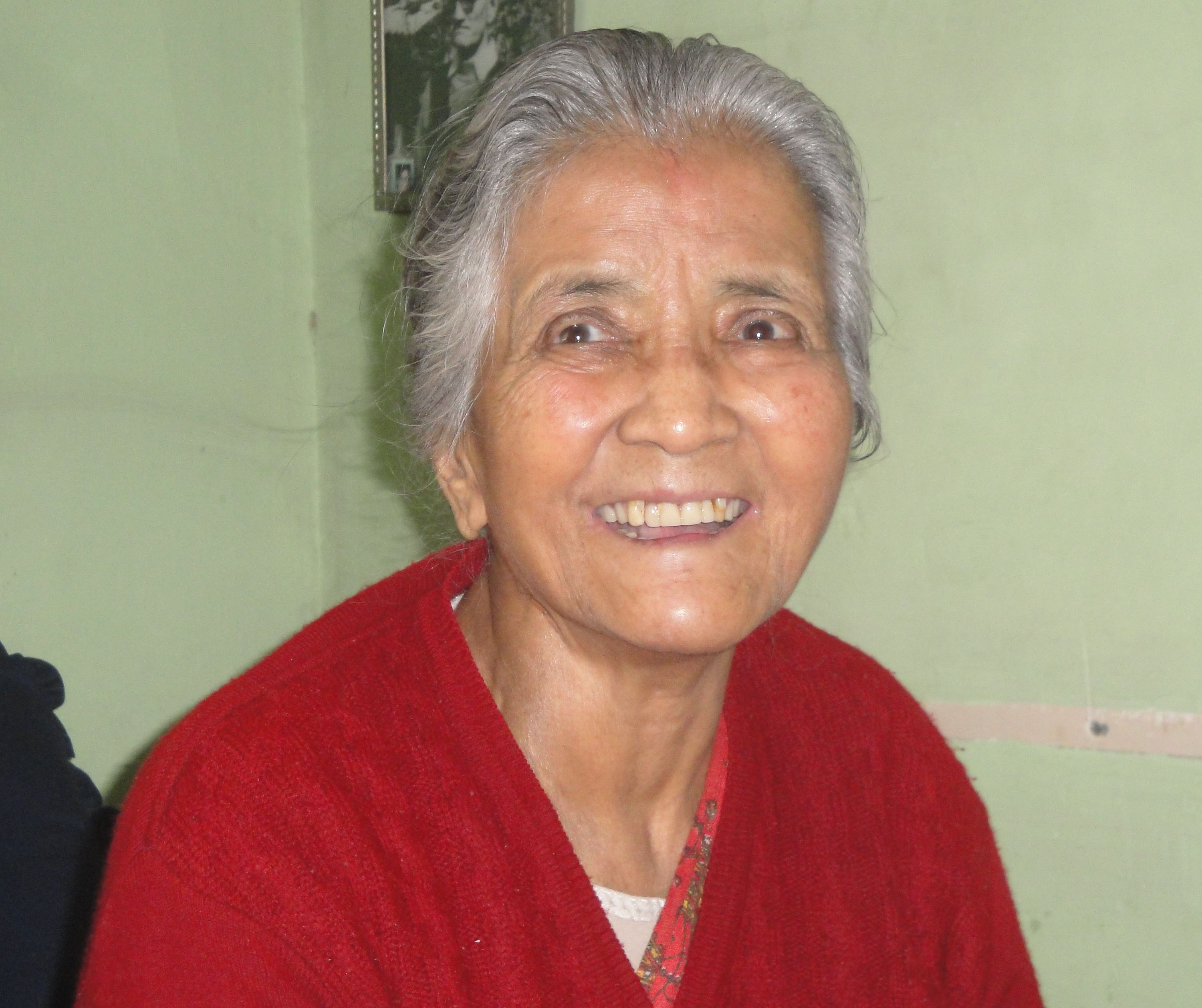
- Pradhan in 2012

Minister of Foreign Affairs
- In office 1 April 2007 – 22 August 2008
- Monarch: Gyanendra
- Preceded by: KP Sharma Oli
- Succeeded by: Upendra Yadav

Minister of Industry and Commerce
- In office 19 April 1990 – 11 May 1991
- Monarch: Birendra Bir Bikram Shah
- Prime Minister: Krishna Prasad Bhattarai

Personal details
- Born: 17 June 1927 Asan, Kathmandu, Nepal
- Died: 22 September 2014 (aged 87) Kathmandu, Nepal
- Party: Communist Party of Nepal (UML)
- Spouse: Pushpa Lal Shrestha

Sahana Pradhan (Nepali: साहाना प्रधान) (17 June 1927 – 22 September 2014) was a Nepalese politician from a Newar family in Kathmandu. She resigned as Minister of Foreign Affairs of Nepal on April 16, 2008. She also served as Deputy Prime Minister of Nepal within the coalition government of Prime Minister Girija Prasad Koirala from 2007 to 2008.

Pradhan was married to communist stalwart Pushpa Lal Shrestha, and was a leading figure in his Communist Party of Nepal. When Pushpa Lal died in 1978, Balaram Upadhyaya became party leader. In 1986 Pradhan became the leader of the party. In 1987 the party merged with Manmohan Adhikari's faction, forming the Communist Party of Nepal (Marxist)

When the CPN(UML) was divided in 1998, Pradhan sided with the break-away faction. She became chairperson of Communist Party of Nepal (Marxist-Leninist). However, in 2002 CPN(ML) merged back into CPN(UML).

At the 2003 7th conference of CPN(UML), Pradhan was reelected to the Central Committee.

Pradhan was the number two candidate of CPN(UML) in the proportional representation list for the April 2008 Constituent Assembly election.

== Death ==
Sahara Pradhan died of a brain hemorrhage on 22 September 2014 at the age of 87 in the Vayodha Hospital in Kathmandu.
