= Communist Party of Nepal (Marxist–Leninist) (1978) =

Former Political party in Nepal

Communist Party of Nepal (Marxist–Leninist) नेपाल कम्युनिस्ट पार्टी (मार्क्सवादी–लेनिनवादी)
- Founded: 26 December 1978
- Dissolved: 6 January 1991
- Succeeded by: CPN (UML)
- Ideology: Communism; Marxism–Leninism
- Political position: Far-left

The Communist Party of Nepal (Marxist–Leninist) was a political party in Nepal. It was launched in 1978 by the All Nepal Communist Revolutionary Coordination Committee (Marxist–Leninist), which was founded by groups involved in the Jhapa movement. The CPN (ML) published Varg-Sangarsh (Class Struggle) and Mukti Morcha (Liberation Front).

== History ==
=== Revolutionary Coordination Committee ===
The All Nepal Communist Revolutionary Coordination Committee (Marxist–Leninist) was founded in 1975 and had been inspired by the Naxalite movement in India led by the Communist Party of India (Marxist–Leninist). It had strong links to the Vinod Mishra faction of CPI (ML) that had a strong presence in the Indian state of Bihar.

The party had its roots in the Jhapa District Committee of the Communist Party of Nepal (Amatya) and the Morang District-based Nepal Revolutionary Organisation (Marxist–Leninist) led by Madhav Kumar Nepal. The party inspired by the Naxalites carried out a peasant-led anti-feudal movement in Jhapa District. On 30 August 1977, Mukti Morcha Samuha led by Madan Kumar Bhandari merged into the party. In August 1978, a section of the Dhanusa District Committee of the Communist Party of Nepal (Amatya) merged into the party followed by Revolutionary Communist Organising Committee on 11 September 1979 and Dang District-based Sandesh Samuha.

The first national convention of the party was held between 26 December 1978 and 1 January 1979 where the ANCRCC (ML) formed the Communist Party of Nepal (Marxist–Leninist). The general convention also elected Chandra Prakash Mainali as the party's first general secretary of CPN (ML).

=== Mergers ===
The party quickly emerged as the main communist faction in the country and several smaller communist factions merged with party. In July 1979 the Gandaki Province-based Marxist–Leninist Revolutionary Communist Party merged with the party. Revolutionary Communists in Arghakhanchi District, Marxist–Leninist Study Group and Revolutionary Communist Organisation, Nepal joined the party in 1980. Communist Party of Nepal (Rebel Unity Centre) and Revolutionaries, a Parbat District-based splinter group of the Nepal Workers and Peasants Organisation joined the party in 1981.

The party had decided to boycott the 1980 Nepalese governmental system referendum which offered a choice between multi-party democracy and a reformed party-less panchayat system. The panchayat system was retained and the party leaders later openly regretted their boycott despite calls from within the party by K.P. Sharma Oli to participate in the referendum.

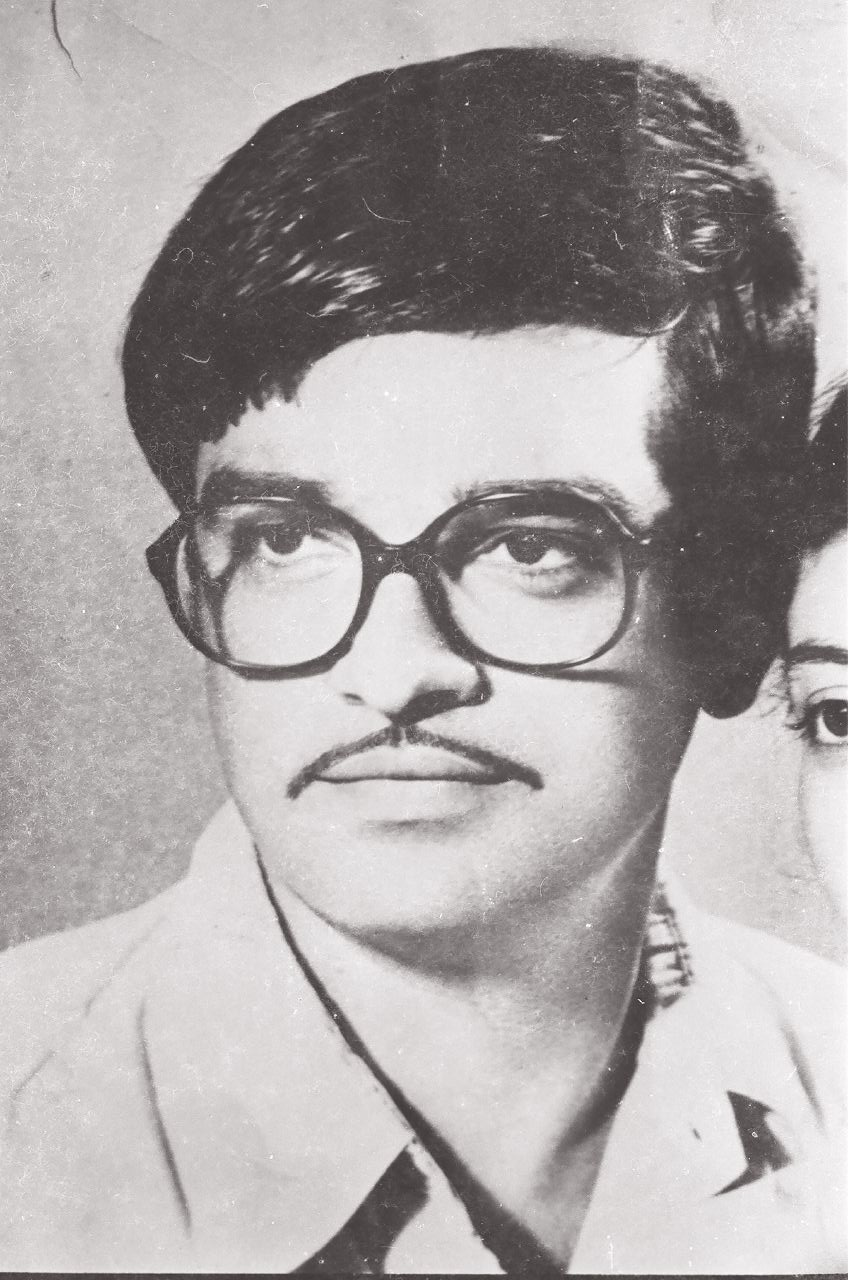
Madan Bhandari, third general secretary of the party and influential at that time

In 1982 a major shift took place. The party abandoned the strategy of armed struggle and opted for mass democratic struggles instead. Mainali was deposed as general secretary, and Jhala Nath Khanal took over the helm. In 1986 the process of reform of CPN (ML) accelerated further, with moderate Madan Bhandari elected general secretary. Barre Sangharsh Samuha and Nepal Workers and Peasants Organisation (D.P. Singh) also merged into the party by 1986.

After the declaration of multi-party democracy in the country, the CPN (ML) which had been functioning underground started working as an open political party. It tried to merge with other left factions in the country with certain success. In 1990 the party formed the United Left Front with other communist factions in the country. On 6 January 1991, before the 1991 general elections, CPN (ML) merged with the Communist Party of Nepal (Marxist) led by Man Mohan Adhikari to form Communist Party of Nepal (Unified Marxist–Leninist).

== Ideology ==
The ideology of the party was "New Democratic Revolution" whose success would eventually lead the country towards socialism and communism. The party accepted Mao as the sole leader of the revolutionary movement. The "New Democratic Revolution" was based on the idea of agrarian revolution by uprooting the power of big landlords through armed struggle.

== Leadership ==
=== General Secretaries of the CPN (Marxist–Leninist) ===
- Chandra Prakash Mainali, 1978–82
- Jhala Nath Khanal, 1982–86
- Madan Kumar Bhandari, 1986–91

== See also ==
- K.P. Sharma Oli
- Madhav Kumar Nepal
- List of communist parties in Nepal
