= April 1992 Nepalese general strike =

In 1992, in a situation of economic crisis and chaos in Nepal, with spiralling prices as a result of implementation of changes in policy of the new Congress government, far-left groups stepped up their political agitation. A Joint People's Agitation Committee was set up together by the Communist Party of Nepal (Unity Centre), Samyukta Jana Morcha, Communist Party of Nepal (Masal), the Nepal Communist League and the Communist Party of Nepal (Marxist-Leninist-Maoist). The committee called for a general strike on April 6.

Violent incidents began to occur on the evening ahead of the strike. The Joint People's Agitation Committee had called for a 30-minute 'lights out' in the capital, and violence erupted outside Bir Hospital when activists tried to enforce the 'lights out'. At dawn on April 6, clashes between strike activists and police outside a police station in Pulchok (Patan) left two activists dead.

Later in the day, a mass rally of the Agitation Committee at Tundikhel in the capital Kathmandu was attacked by police forces. As a result, riots broke out, and the Nepal Telecommunications building was set on fire. Police opened fire at the crowd, killing several people. The Human Rights Organisation of Nepal estimated that 14 people, including several on-lookers, had been killed.

The violent incidents in connection with the strike spurred radical elements within the Nepalese communist movement to debate the usefulness of participation in legal politics. Two years later the Communist Party of Nepal (Unity Centre) was divided, with one section opting for armed struggle. This group would later rename itself as the Communist Party of Nepal (Maoist) and declare a "People's War" in 1996, which became the starting point for the decade-long civil war.
