= April 1 =

April 1 this year in various calendars
- Wednesday, 1 April 2026
Akan	Nkyiwukuo
Armenian	15 Ahekani 1475
Aztec	Tlaxochimaco 1, 4 Ātl
Babylonian	12 Adaru, 2336 SE
Balinese pawukon	Menga, Kajeng, Sri, Pon, Urukung, Buda of Watugunung, Ludra, Erangan, Sri
Bengali	18 Chaitro, BS 1432
Chinese	Yin Wood Snake・Chariot Mansion; Fire Horse Year, Month 2, Day 14 (Chunfen, 4 days until Qingming)
Common Era	1 April 2026 CE
Coptic	23 Paremhat, AM 1742
Egyptian	20 Mesori, 2774 NE
Ethiopian	23 Magābit, 2018 Amätä Məhrät
French Republican	Décade II, Duodi de Germinal de l'Année 234 de la République
Gregorian	1 April, AD 2026
Hebrew	14 Nisan, AM 5786
Hindu	Uttaraphalgunī・Vṛddhi; Solar: 19 Caitra, 1947 SE; Lunisolar: Caturdaśī, Śukla pakṣa of Caitra, 2083 VE; Rāudra・5126 KY・1,872,666
Icelandic	Miðvikudagur, 9 Einmánuður 2025
Islamic	13 Shawwal, AH 1447 (using tabular method)
ISO week date	2026-W14-3
Japanese	14 Kisaragi, Reiwa 8 (Shunbun, 4 days until Seimei)
Julian	19 March, AD 2026 (AM 7534)
Julian day	2461132
Korean	14 Tokkidal, 4359 DE
Maya	13.0.13.8.9; 2 Pop, 4 Muluc
Roman	ante diem XIV Kalendas Apriles, MMDCCLXXIX AUC
Solar Hijri	12 Farvardin, SH 1405
Tibetan	15 dbo, me pho rta 2153 or 1772 or 1000

<<	April					>>
Su	Mo	Tu	We	Th	Fr	Sa
			1	2	3	4
5	6	7	8	9	10	11
12	13	14	15	16	17	18
19	20	21	22	23	24	25
26	27	28	29	30
2026

April 1 in recent years
2026 (Wednesday)
2025 (Tuesday)
2024 (Monday)
2023 (Saturday)
2022 (Friday)
2021 (Thursday)
2020 (Wednesday)
2019 (Monday)
2018 (Sunday)
2017 (Saturday)

April 1 is the 91st day of the year (92nd in leap years) in the Gregorian calendar; 274 days remain until the end of the year.

== Events ==
=== Pre-1600 ===
- 285 – Roman emperor Diocletian names Maximian his co-emperor ("Augustus").
- 527 – Byzantine Emperor Justin I names his nephew Justinian I as co-ruler and successor to the throne.
- 1081 – Alexios I Komnenos overthrows the Byzantine emperor Nikephoros III Botaneiates, and, after his troops spend three days extensively looting Constantinople, is formally crowned on April 4.
- 1572 – In the Eighty Years' War, the Watergeuzen capture Brielle from the Seventeen Provinces, gaining the first foothold on land for what would become the Dutch Republic.

=== 1601–1900 ===
- 1725 – J. S. Bach's later Easter Oratorio in its first version is performed at the Nikolaikirche in Leipzig on Easter Sunday.
- 1789 – In New York City, the United States House of Representatives achieves its first quorum and elects Frederick Muhlenberg of Pennsylvania as its first Speaker.
- 1833 – The Convention of 1833, a political gathering of settlers in Mexican Texas to help draft a series of petitions to the Mexican government, begins in San Felipe de Austin.
- 1865 – American Civil War: Union troops led by Philip Sheridan decisively defeat Confederate troops led by George Pickett, cutting the Army of Northern Virginia's last supply line during the Siege of Petersburg.
- 1867 – Singapore becomes a British crown colony.
- 1873 – The White Star steamer SS Atlantic sinks off Nova Scotia, killing 547 in one of the worst marine disasters of the 19th century.
- 1900 – Prince George becomes absolute monarch of the Cretan State.

=== 1901–present ===
- 1908 – The Territorial Force (renamed Territorial Army in 1920) is formed as a volunteer reserve component of the British Army.
- 1918 – The Royal Air Force is created by the merger of the Royal Flying Corps and the Royal Naval Air Service.
- 1922 – In newly formed Northern Ireland, six Catholics are murdered in the Arnon Street killings, one week after six others were killed in the McMahon killings.
- 1924 – Adolf Hitler is sentenced to five years fortress confinement for his participation in the "Beer Hall Putsch" but spends only nine months in jail.
- 1924 – The Royal Canadian Air Force is formed.
- 1933 – The recently elected Nazis under Julius Streicher organize a one-day boycott of all Jewish-owned businesses in Germany, ushering in a series of anti-Semitic acts.
- 1935 – India's central banking institution, the Reserve Bank of India, is formed.
- 1937 – Aden becomes a British crown colony.
- 1937 – The Royal New Zealand Air Force is formed as an independent service.
- 1939 – Spanish Civil War: Generalísimo Francisco Franco of the Spanish State announces the end of the Spanish Civil War, when the last of the Republican forces surrender.
- 1941 – Fântâna Albă massacre: Between two hundred and two thousand Romanian civilians are killed by Soviet Border Troops.
- 1941 – A military coup in Iraq overthrows the regime of 'Abd al-Ilah and installs Rashid Ali al-Gaylani as Prime Minister.
- 1944 – World War II: Navigation errors lead to an accidental American bombing of the Swiss city of Schaffhausen.
- 1945 – World War II: The Tenth United States Army attacks the Thirty-Second Japanese Army on Okinawa.
- 1945 – World War II: Despite being marked and accepted as a protected hospital ship by the United States Navy, Japanese relief ship MV Awa Maru is torpedoed and sunk by USS Queenfish against orders, resulting in the loss of all but one of the 2,004 people aboard.
- 1946 – The 8.6 M_{w} Aleutian Islands earthquake shakes the Aleutian Islands with a maximum Mercalli intensity of VI (Strong). A destructive tsunami reaches the Hawaiian Islands resulting in dozens of deaths, mostly in Hilo, Hawaii.
- 1946 – The Malayan Union is established. Protests from locals led to the establishment of the Federation of Malaya two years later.
- 1947 – The only mutiny in the history of the Royal New Zealand Navy begins.
- 1948 – Cold War: Communist forces respond to the introduction of the Deutsche Mark by attempting to force the western powers to withdraw from Berlin.
- 1948 – Faroe Islands gain autonomy from Denmark.
- 1949 – The Government of Canada repeals Japanese-Canadian internment after seven years.
- 1954 – United States President Dwight D. Eisenhower authorizes the creation of the United States Air Force Academy in Colorado Springs, Colorado.
- 1955 – The EOKA rebellion against the British Empire begins in Cyprus, with the goal of unifying with Greece.
- 1960 – The TIROS-1 satellite transmits the first television picture from space.
- 1964 – The British Admiralty, War Office and Air Ministry are replaced by a unified Defence Council of the United Kingdom.
- 1969 – The Hawker Siddeley Harrier, the first operational fighter aircraft with Vertical/Short Takeoff and Landing capabilities, enters service with the Royal Air Force.
- 1970 – President Richard Nixon signs the Public Health Cigarette Smoking Act into law.
- 1970 – A Royal Air Maroc Sud Aviation Caravelle crashes near Berrechid, Morocco, killing 61.
- 1971 – Bangladesh Liberation War: The Pakistan Army massacre more than a thousand people in Keraniganj Upazila, Bangladesh.
- 1973 – Project Tiger, a tiger conservation project, is launched in the Jim Corbett National Park, India.
- 1974 – The Local Government Act 1972 of England and Wales comes into effect.
- 1976 – Steve Jobs and Steve Wozniak found Apple Computer, Inc.
- 1979 – Iran becomes an Islamic republic by a 99% vote, officially overthrowing the Shah.
- 1984 – Singer Marvin Gaye is shot to death by his father in his home in Arlington Heights, Los Angeles, California.
- 1986 – Communist Party of Nepal (Mashal) cadres attack a number of police stations in Kathmandu, seeking to incite a popular rebellion.
- 1989 – Margaret Thatcher's new local government tax, the Community Charge (commonly known as the "poll tax"), is introduced in Scotland.
- 1993 – NASCAR champion Alan Kulwicki is killed in a plane crash near the Tri-Cities Regional Airport in Blountville, Tennessee.
- 1997 – Comet Hale–Bopp is seen passing at perihelion.
- 1999 – Nunavut is established as a Canadian territory carved out of the eastern part of the Northwest Territories.
- 2001 – An EP-3E United States Navy surveillance aircraft collides with a Chinese People's Liberation Army Shenyang J-8 fighter jet. The Chinese pilot ejected but is subsequently lost. The Navy crew makes an emergency landing in Hainan, China and is detained.
- 2001 – Former President of Federal Republic of Yugoslavia Slobodan Milošević surrenders to police special forces, to be tried on war crimes charges.
- 2001 – Same-sex marriage becomes legal in the Netherlands, the first contemporary country to allow it.
- 2004 – Google launches its Email service Gmail.
- 2006 – Serious Organised Crime Agency (SOCA) of the Government of the United Kingdom is enforced, but later merged into National Crime Agency on 7 October 2013.
- 2011 – After protests against the burning of the Quran turn violent, a mob attacks a United Nations compound in Mazar-i-Sharif, Afghanistan, resulting in the deaths of fourteen people, including seven UN workers.
- 2016 – The 2016 Nagorno-Karabakh conflict begins along the Nagorno-Karabakh Line of Contact.
- 2026 – The Artemis II lunar flyby mission launches, marking the first crewed flight above low Earth orbit since Apollo 17 in 1972.

== Births ==
=== Pre-1600 ===
- 1220 – Emperor Go-Saga of Japan (died 1272)
- 1282 – Louis IV, Holy Roman Emperor (died 1347)
- 1328 – Blanche of France, Duchess of Orléans (died 1382)
- 1543 – François de Bonne, Duke of Lesdiguières (died 1626)
- 1578 – William Harvey, English physician and academic (died 1657)

=== 1601–1900 ===
- 1610 – Charles de Saint-Évremond, French soldier and critic (died 1703)
- 1629 – Jean-Henri d'Anglebert, French organist and composer (died 1691)
- 1640 – Georg Mohr, Danish mathematician and academic (died 1697)
- 1647 – John Wilmot, 2nd Earl of Rochester, English poet and courtier (died 1680)
- 1697 – Antoine François Prévost, French novelist and translator (died 1763)
- 1721 – Pieter Hellendaal, Dutch-English organist, violinist, and composer (died 1799)
- 1741 – George Dance the Younger, English architect and surveyor (died 1825)
- 1753 – Joseph de Maistre, French philosopher, lawyer, and diplomat (died 1821)
- 1765 – Luigi Schiavonetti, Italian engraver and etcher (died 1810)
- 1776 – Sophie Germain, French mathematician, physicist, and philosopher (died 1831)
- 1786 – William Mulready, Irish genre painter (died 1863)
- 1815 – Otto von Bismarck, German lawyer and politician, 1st Chancellor of the German Empire (died 1898)
- 1815 – Edward Clark, American lawyer and politician, 8th Governor of Texas (died 1880)
- 1823 – Simon Bolivar Buckner, American general and politician, 30th Governor of Kentucky (died 1891)
- 1824 – Louis-Zéphirin Moreau, Canadian bishop (died 1901)
- 1834 – James Fisk, American businessman (died 1872)
- 1852 – Edwin Austin Abbey, American painter and illustrator (died 1911)
- 1858 – Columba Marmion, Irish Benedictine abbot (died 1923)
- 1865 – Richard Adolf Zsigmondy, Austrian-German chemist and academic, Nobel Prize laureate (died 1929)
- 1866 – William Blomfield, New Zealand cartoonist and politician (died 1938)
- 1866 – Ferruccio Busoni, Italian pianist, composer, and conductor (died 1924)
- 1866 – Ève Lavallière, French actress (died 1929)
- 1868 – Edmond Rostand, French poet and playwright (died 1918)
- 1868 – Walter Mead, English cricketer (died 1954)
- 1871 – F. Melius Christiansen, Norwegian-American violinist and conductor (died 1955)
- 1873 – Sergei Rachmaninoff, Russian pianist, composer, and conductor (died 1943)
- 1874 – Ernest Barnes, English mathematician and theologian (died 1953)
- 1874 – Prince Karl of Bavaria (died 1927)
- 1875 – Edgar Wallace, English journalist, author, and playwright (died 1932)
- 1878 – C. Ganesha Iyer, Ceylon Tamil philologist (died 1958)
- 1879 – Stanislaus Zbyszko, Polish wrestler and strongman (died 1967)
- 1881 – Octavian Goga, Romanian Prime Minister (died 1938)
- 1883 – Lon Chaney, American actor, director, and screenwriter (died 1930)
- 1883 – Edvard Drabløs, Norwegian actor and director (died 1976)
- 1883 – Laurette Taylor, Irish-American actress (died 1946)
- 1885 – Wallace Beery, American actor (died 1949)
- 1885 – Clementine Churchill, English wife of Winston Churchill (died 1977)
- 1889 – K. B. Hedgewar, Indian physician and activist (died 1940)
- 1893 – Cicely Courtneidge, Australian-English actress (died 1980)
- 1895 – Alberta Hunter, African-American singer-songwriter and nurse (died 1984)
- 1898 – William James Sidis, Ukrainian-Russian Jewish American mathematician, anthropologist, and historian (died 1944)
- 1899 – Gustavs Celmiņš, Latvian academic and politician (died 1968)
- 1900 – Stefanie Clausen, Danish Olympic diver (died 1981)

=== 1901–present ===
- 1901 – Whittaker Chambers, American journalist and spy (died 1961)
- 1902 – Maria Polydouri, Greek poet (died 1930)
- 1905 – Gaston Eyskens, Belgian economist and politician, 47th Prime Minister of Belgium (died 1988)
- 1905 – Paul Hasluck, Australian historian, poet, and politician, 17th Governor-General of Australia (died 1993)
- 1906 – Alexander Sergeyevich Yakovlev, Russian engineer, founded the Yakovlev Design Bureau (died 1989)
- 1907 – Shivakumara Swami, Indian religious leader and philanthropist (died 2019)
- 1908 – Abraham Maslow, American psychologist and academic (died 1970)
- 1908 – Harlow Rothert, American shot putter, lawyer, and academic (died 1997)
- 1909 – Abner Biberman, American actor, director, and screenwriter (died 1977)
- 1909 – Eddy Duchin, American pianist and bandleader (died 1951)
- 1910 – Harry Carney, American saxophonist and clarinet player (died 1974)
- 1910 – Bob Van Osdel, American high jumper and soldier (died 1987)
- 1911 – Augusta Braxton Baker, African American librarian (died 1998)
- 1913 – Memos Makris, Greek sculptor (died 1993)
- 1915 – O. W. Fischer, Austrian-Swiss actor and director (died 2004)
- 1916 – Sheila May Edmonds, British mathematician (died 2002)
- 1917 – Sydney Newman, Canadian screenwriter and producer, co-created Doctor Who (died 1997)
- 1917 – Melville Shavelson, American director, producer, and screenwriter (died 2007)
- 1919 – Joseph Murray, American surgeon and soldier, Nobel Prize laureate (died 2012)
- 1920 – Toshiro Mifune, Japanese actor (died 1997)
- 1921 – William Bergsma, American composer and educator (died 1994)
- 1921 – Arthur "Guitar Boogie" Smith, American guitarist, fiddler, and composer (died 2014)
- 1922 – Duke Jordan, American pianist and composer (died 2006)
- 1922 – William Manchester, American historian and author (died 2004)
- 1924 – Brendan Byrne, American lieutenant, judge, and politician, 47th Governor of New Jersey (died 2018)
- 1926 – Anne McCaffrey, American-Irish author (died 2011)
- 1927 – Walter Bahr, American soccer player, coach, and manager (died 2018)
- 1927 – Amos Milburn, American R&B singer-songwriter and pianist (died 1980)
- 1927 – Ferenc Puskás, Hungarian footballer and manager (died 2006)
- 1929 – Jonathan Haze, American actor, producer, screenwriter, and production manager (died 2024)
- 1929 – Milan Kundera, Czech-French novelist, poet, and playwright (died 2023)
- 1929 – Payut Ngaokrachang, Thai animator and director (died 2010)
- 1929 – Jane Powell, American actress, singer, and dancer (died 2021)
- 1930 – Grace Lee Whitney, American actress and singer (died 2015)
- 1930 – Ásta Sigurðardóttir, Icelandic writer and visual artist (died 1971)
- 1931 – George Baker, Bulgarian-English actor and screenwriter (died 2011)
- 1931 – Rolf Hochhuth, German author and playwright (died 2020)
- 1932 – Debbie Reynolds, American actress, singer, and dancer (died 2016)
- 1933 – Claude Cohen-Tannoudji, Algerian-French physicist and academic, Nobel Prize laureate (died 2026)
- 1933 – Dan Flavin, American sculptor and educator (died 1996)
- 1933 – Bengt Holbek, Danish folklorist (died 1992)
- 1934 – Vladimir Posner, French-American journalist and radio host
- 1935 – Cyril Karabus, South African paediatric oncologist
- 1935 – Larry McDonald, American physician and politician (died 1983)
- 1936 – Peter Collinson, English-American director and producer (died 1980)
- 1936 – Jean-Pascal Delamuraz, Swiss politician, 80th President of the Swiss Confederation (died 1998)
- 1936 – Tarun Gogoi, Indian politician, 14th Chief Minister of Assam (died 2020)
- 1936 – Abdul Qadeer Khan, Indian-Pakistani physicist, chemist, and engineer (died 2021)
- 1937 – Jordan Charney, American actor
- 1937 – Yılmaz Güney, Palme d'Or award-winning Kurdish film director, scenarist, actor, novelist and activist (died 1984)
- 1937 – Lynn Garrison, Canadian aviator, political advisor, and mercenary
- 1939 – Ali MacGraw, American model and actress
- 1939 – Phil Niekro, American baseball player and manager (died 2020)
- 1940 – Wangari Maathai, Kenyan environmentalist and politician, Nobel Prize laureate (died 2011)
- 1941 – Gideon Gadot, Israeli journalist and politician (died 2012)
- 1941 – Ajit Wadekar, Indian cricketer, coach, and manager (died 2018)
- 1942 – Samuel R. Delany, American author and critic
- 1942 – Richard D. Wolff, American economist and academic
- 1943 – Dafydd Wigley, Welsh academic and politician
- 1943 – Titina Silá, Bissau-Guinean revolutionary (died 1973)
- 1946 – Nikitas Kaklamanis, Greek academic and politician, Greek Minister of Health and Social Security
- 1946 – Ronnie Lane, English bass player, songwriter, and producer (died 1997)
- 1946 – Arrigo Sacchi, Italian footballer, coach, and manager
- 1947 – Alain Connes, French mathematician and academic
- 1948 – Javier Irureta, Spanish footballer and manager
- 1948 – Peter Law, Welsh politician and independent Member of Parliament (died 2006)
- 1949 – Gérard Mestrallet, French businessman
- 1949 – Paul Manafort, American lobbyist, political consultant, and convicted felon
- 1949 – Sammy Nelson, Northern Irish footballer and coach
- 1949 – Gil Scott-Heron, American singer-songwriter and author (died 2011)
- 1950 – Samuel Alito, American lawyer and jurist, Associate Justice of the Supreme Court of the United States
- 1950 – Loris Kessel, Swiss racing driver (died 2010)
- 1950 – Daniel Paillé, Canadian academic and politician
- 1951 – John Abizaid, American general
- 1952 – Annette O'Toole, American actress
- 1952 – Bernard Stiegler, French philosopher and academic (died 2020)
- 1953 – Barry Sonnenfeld, American cinematographer, director, and producer
- 1953 – Alberto Zaccheroni, Italian footballer and manager
- 1954 – Jeff Porcaro, American drummer, songwriter, and producer (died 1992)
- 1955 – Don Hasselbeck, American football player and sportscaster
- 1955 – Humayun Akhtar Khan, Pakistani politician, 5th Commerce Minister of Pakistan
- 1957 – John Farragher, Australian rugby league player (died 2025)
- 1957 – David Gower, English cricketer and sportscaster
- 1957 – Denise Nickerson, American actress (died 2019)
- 1958 – D. Boon, American singer and musician (died 1985)
- 1959 – Helmut Duckadam, Romanian footballer (died 2024)
- 1961 – Susan Boyle, Scottish singer
- 1961 – Sergio Scariolo, Italian professional basketball head coach
- 1961 – Mark White, English singer-songwriter and guitarist
- 1962 – Mark Shulman, American author
- 1962 – Chris Grayling, English journalist and politician, Lord High Chancellor of Great Britain
- 1962 – Samboy Lim, Filipino basketball player and manager (died 2023)
- 1962 – Phillip Schofield, English television host
- 1963 – Teodoro de Villa Diaz, Filipino guitarist and songwriter (died 1988)
- 1963 – Aprille Ericsson-Jackson, American aerospace engineer
- 1964 – Erik Breukink, Dutch cyclist and manager
- 1964 – Kevin Duckworth, American basketball player (died 2008)
- 1964 – John Morris, English cricketer
- 1964 – José Rodrigues dos Santos, Portuguese journalist, author, and educator
- 1965 – Jane Adams, American film, television, and stage actress
- 1965 – Mark Jackson, American basketball player and coach
- 1966 – Chris Evans, English radio and television host
- 1966 – Mehmet Özdilek, Turkish footballer and manager
- 1967 – Nicola Roxon, Australian lawyer and politician, 34th Attorney-General for Australia
- 1968 – Mike Baird, Australian politician, 44th Premier of New South Wales
- 1968 – Andreas Schnaas, German actor and director
- 1968 – Alexander Stubb, Finnish academic and politician, 43rd Prime Minister of Finland and 13th President of Finland
- 1969 – Lev Lobodin, Ukrainian-Russian decathlete
- 1969 – Andrew Vlahov, Australian basketball player
- 1969 – Dean Windass, English footballer and manager
- 1970 – Brad Meltzer, American author, screenwriter, and producer
- 1971 – Sonia Bisset, Cuban javelin thrower
- 1971 – Shinji Nakano, Japanese racing driver
- 1972 – Darren McCarty, Canadian ice hockey player and sportscaster
- 1972 – Jesse Tobias, American guitarist and songwriter
- 1973 – Christian Finnegan, American comedian and actor
- 1973 – Stephen Fleming, New Zealand cricketer and coach
- 1973 – Rachel Maddow, American journalist and author
- 1974 – Hugo Ibarra, Argentinian footballer and manager
- 1975 – John Butler, American-Australian singer-songwriter and producer
- 1975 – Magdalena Maleeva, Bulgarian tennis player
- 1976 – Hazem El Masri, Lebanese-Australian rugby league player and educator
- 1976 – David Gilliland, American race car driver
- 1976 – Gábor Király, Hungarian footballer
- 1976 – David Oyelowo, English actor
- 1976 – Clarence Seedorf, Dutch-Brazilian footballer and manager
- 1976 – Yuka Yoshida, Japanese tennis player
- 1977 – Vitor Belfort, Brazilian-American boxer and mixed martial artist
- 1977 – Haimar Zubeldia, Spanish cyclist
- 1978 – Antonio de Nigris, Mexican footballer (died 2009)
- 1978 – Mirka Federer, Slovak-Swiss tennis player
- 1978 – Anamaria Marinca, Romanian-English actress
- 1978 – Etan Thomas, American basketball player
- 1979 – Ruth Beitia, Spanish high jumper
- 1980 – Dennis Kruppke, German footballer
- 1980 – Randy Orton, American wrestler
- 1980 – Bijou Phillips, American actress and model
- 1981 – Antonis Fotsis, Greek basketball player
- 1981 – Bjørn Einar Romøren, Norwegian ski jumper
- 1982 – Taran Killam, American actor, voice artist, comedian, and writer
- 1982 – Andreas Thorkildsen, Norwegian javelin thrower
- 1983 – Ólafur Ingi Skúlason, Icelandic footballer
- 1983 – Sean Taylor, American football player (died 2007)
- 1984 – Gilberto Macena, Brazilian footballer
- 1985 – Daniel Murphy, American baseball player
- 1985 – Beth Tweddle, English gymnast
- 1986 – Nikolaos Kourtidis, Greek weightlifter
- 1986 – Hillary Scott, American country singer-songwriter
- 1987 – Vitorino Antunes, Portuguese footballer
- 1987 – Ding Junhui, Chinese professional snooker player
- 1987 – Gianluca Musacci, Italian footballer
- 1987 – Oliver Turvey, English racing driver
- 1988 – Brook Lopez, American basketball player
- 1988 – Robin Lopez, American basketball player
- 1989 – Jan Blokhuijsen, Dutch speed skater
- 1989 – David Ngog, French footballer
- 1989 – Christian Vietoris, German racing driver
- 1990 – Julia Fischer, German discus thrower
- 1991 – Duván Zapata, Colombian footballer
- 1992 – Deng Linlin, Chinese gymnast
- 1995 – Jofra Archer, Barbadian-English cricketer
- 1995 – Logan Paul, American YouTuber, actor and wrestler
- 1996 – Sophia Hutchins, American socialite
- 1997 – Asa Butterfield, English actor
- 1997 – Álex Palou, Spanish racing driver
- 1998 – King Combs, American rapper
- 1998 – Mitchell Robinson, American basketball player
- 1999 – Gabe Davis, American football player
- 2000 – Rhian Brewster, English footballer

== Deaths ==
=== Pre-1600 ===
- 33 – Jesus of Nazareth, (Gregorian Calendar Date)
- 996 – John XV, pope of the Catholic Church
- 1085 – Shen Zong, Chinese emperor (born 1048)
- 1132 – Hugh of Châteauneuf, French bishop (born 1053)
- 1204 – Eleanor of Aquitaine, Duchess of Aquitaine, Queen Consort of France and England (born 1122)
- 1205 – Amalric II, king of Cyprus and Jerusalem
- 1282 – Abaqa Khan, ruler of the Mongol Ilkhanate (born 1234)
- 1431 – Nuno Álvares Pereira, Portuguese general (born 1360)
- 1441 – Blanche I, queen of Navarre and Sicily (born 1387)
- 1455 – Zbigniew Oleśnicki, Polish cardinal and statesman (born 1389)
- 1528 – Francisco de Peñalosa, Spanish composer (born 1470)
- 1548 – Sigismund I, king of Poland (born 1467)
- 1580 – Alonso Mudarra, Spanish guitarist and composer (born 1510)

=== 1601–1900 ===
- 1621 – Cristofano Allori, Italian painter and educator (born 1577)
- 1682 – Franz Egon of Fürstenberg, Bavarian bishop (born 1625)
- 1787 – Floyer Sydenham, English scholar and academic (born 1710)
- 1839 – Benjamin Pierce, American soldier and politician, 11th Governor of New Hampshire (born 1757)
- 1865 – Antonios Kriezis, Greek Navy officer and Prime Minister of Greece (born 1796)
- 1865 – Giuditta Pasta, Italian soprano (born 1797)
- 1872 – Frederick Denison Maurice, English theologian and academic (born 1805)
- 1878 – John C.W. Daly, English-Canadian soldier and politician (born 1796)
- 1890 – David Wilber, American politician (born 1820)
- 1890 – Alexander Mozhaysky, Russian soldier, pilot, and engineer (born 1825)

=== 1901–present ===
- 1914 – Rube Waddell, American baseball player (born 1876)
- 1914 – Charles Wells, English founder of Charles Wells Ltd (born 1842)
- 1917 – Scott Joplin, American pianist and composer (born 1868)
- 1920 – Walter Simon, German banker and philanthropist (born 1857)
- 1922 – Charles I, emperor of Austria (born 1887)
- 1924 – Jacob Bolotin, American physician (born 1888)
- 1924 – Lloyd Hildebrand, English cyclist (born 1870)
- 1924 – Stan Rowley, Australian sprinter (born 1876)
- 1946 – Noah Beery, Sr., American actor (born 1882)
- 1947 – George II, king of Greece (born 1890)
- 1950 – Charles R. Drew, American physician and surgeon (born 1904)
- 1950 – Recep Peker, Turkish soldier and politician, 6th Prime Minister of Turkey (born 1889)
- 1962 – Jussi Kekkonen, Finnish captain and businessman (born 1910)
- 1963 – Agnes Mowinckel, Norwegian actress (born 1875)
- 1965 – Helena Rubinstein, Polish-American businesswoman (born 1870)
- 1966 – Brian O'Nolan, Irish author (born 1911)
- 1968 – Lev Landau, Azerbaijani-Russian physicist and academic, Nobel Prize laureate (born 1908)
- 1971 – Kathleen Lonsdale, Irish crystallographer and prison reformer (born 1903)
- 1976 – Max Ernst, German painter and sculptor (born 1891)
- 1981 – Eua Sunthornsanan, Thai singer-songwriter and bandleader (born 1910)
- 1984 – Marvin Gaye, American singer-songwriter (born 1939)
- 1984 – Elizabeth Goudge, English author (born 1900)
- 1986 – Erik Bruhn, Danish actor, director, and choreographer (born 1928)
- 1986 – Edwin Boston, English clergyman, author, and railway preservationist
- 1987 – Henri Cochet, French tennis player (born 1901)
- 1991 – Martha Graham, American dancer and choreographer (born 1894)
- 1991 – Jaime Guzmán, Chilean lawyer and politician (born 1946)
- 1992 – Michael Havers, Baron Havers, English lawyer and politician, Lord High Chancellor of Great Britain (born 1923)
- 1993 – Alan Kulwicki, American race car driver (born 1954)
- 1994 – Robert Doisneau, French photographer (born 1912)
- 1995 – H. Adams Carter, American mountaineer, journalist, and educator (born 1914)
- 1995 – Francisco Moncion, Dominican American ballet dancer, choreographer, charter member of the New York City Ballet (born 1918)
- 1995 – Lucie Rie, Austrian-English potter (born 1902)
- 1996 – Mário Viegas, Portuguese actor and poetry reciter (born 1948)
- 1997 – Makar Honcharenko, Ukrainian footballer and manager (born 1912)
- 1998 – Rozz Williams, American singer-songwriter and guitarist (born 1963)
- 1999 – Jesse Stone, American pianist, songwriter, and producer (born 1901)
- 2001 – Trịnh Công Sơn, Vietnamese guitarist and composer (born 1939)
- 2002 – Simo Häyhä, Finnish soldier and sniper (born 1905)
- 2003 – Leslie Cheung, Hong Kong singer-songwriter and actor (born 1956)
- 2004 – Ioannis Kyrastas, Greek footballer and manager (born 1952)
- 2004 – Carrie Snodgress, American actress (born 1945)
- 2005 – Paul Bomani, Tanzanian politician and diplomat, 1st Tanzanian Minister of Finance (b 1925)
- 2005 – Robert Coldwell Wood, American political scientist and academic (born 1923)
- 2006 – In Tam, Cambodian general and politician, 26th Prime Minister of Cambodia (born 1916)
- 2010 – John Forsythe, American actor (born 1918)
- 2010 – Tzannis Tzannetakis, Greek soldier and politician, 175th Prime Minister of Greece (born 1927)
- 2012 – Lionel Bowen, Australian soldier, lawyer, and politician, Deputy Prime Minister of Australia (born 1922)
- 2012 – Giorgio Chinaglia, Italian-American soccer player and radio host (born 1947)
- 2012 – Miguel de la Madrid, Mexican banker, academic, and politician, 52nd President of Mexico (born 1934)
- 2013 – Moses Blah, Liberian general and politician, 23rd President of Liberia (born 1947)
- 2013 – Karen Muir, South African swimmer and physician (born 1952)
- 2014 – King Fleming, American pianist and bandleader (born 1922)
- 2014 – Jacques Le Goff, French historian and author (born 1924)
- 2014 – Rolf Rendtorff, German theologian and academic (born 1925)
- 2015 – Nicolae Rainea, Romanian footballer and referee (born 1933)
- 2017 – Lonnie Brooks, American blues singer and guitarist (born 1933)
- 2017 – Yevgeny Yevtushenko, Soviet and Russian poet and writer (born 1932)
- 2018 – Steven Bochco, American television writer and producer (born 1943)
- 2019 – Vonda N. McIntyre, American science fiction author (born 1948)
- 2024 – Lou Conter, American naval commander (born 1921)
- 2024 – Vontae Davis, American football player (born 1988)
- 2024 – Joe Flaherty, American actor, writer, and comedian (born 1941)
- 2024 – Sami Michael, Iraqi-born Israeli writer and human rights activist (born 1926)
- 2024 – Ed Piskor, American comic book artist (born 1982)
- 2024 – Mohammad Reza Zahedi, Iranian senior military officer (born 1960)
- 2025 – Val Kilmer, American actor (born 1959)
- 2025 – Johnny Tillotson, American singer-songwriter (born 1938)

== Holidays and observances ==
- Christian feast day:
  - Cellach of Armagh
  - Hugh of Grenoble
  - Frederick Denison Maurice (Church of England)
  - Mary of Egypt
  - Melito of Sardis
  - Tewdrig
  - Theodora
  - Walric, abbot of Leuconay
  - April 1 (Eastern Orthodox liturgics)
- April Fools' Day
- Odisha Day (Odisha, India)
- Arbor Day (Tanzania)
- Civil Service Day (Thailand)
- Cyprus National Day (Cyprus)
- Edible Book Day
- Fossil Fools Day
- Kha b-Nisan, the Assyrian New Year (Assyrian people)
