= Socialist Front (Nepal) =

Political alliance in Nepal

Socialist Front समाजवादी मोर्चा
- Abbreviation: SMN
- Chairperson: Madhav Kumar Nepal
- Founded: 2023
- Succeeded by: Nepali Communist Party
- Ideology: Communism; Socialism; Minor tendencies: Marxism–Leninism; Marxism–Leninism–Maoism; Prachanda Path; Left-wing nationalism People's Multiparty Democracy; Federalism
- Political position: Left-wing to far-left
- House of Representatives: 42 / 275
- National Assembly: 28 / 59
- Provincial Assemblies: 110 / 550
- Chief Ministers: 3 / 7
- Mayors/Chairs: 141 / 753
- Councillors: 6,032 / 35,011

The Socialist Front (Nepali: समाजवादी मोर्चा, romanized: Samajbadi Morcha) was a political alliance of leftist political parties in Nepal. It was formed in 2023 by the CPN (Maoist Centre), CPN (Unified Socialist), the People's Socialist Party, Nepal and the Communist Party of Nepal led by Biplav.

== History ==
The Socialist Front was born as a four party front comprising the CPN (MC), CPN (Unified Socialist), the PSP-N and the CPN (2014) of Biplav Si on 19 June 2023. This was announced amidst a program held at National Assembly hall, Bhrikuti Mandap.

It was reported that there would be a rotational leadership through the front's chairman post, with Madhav Kumar Nepal leading the front for an interim period of time.

== Member parties ==
Party	Rastriya Sabha	Pratinidhi Sabha	Pradesh Sabha
CPN (Maoist Centre)	18	30	85
CPN (Unified Socialist)	8	10	24
Nepal Socialist Party (Mahindra faction)	0	2	0
Communist Party of Nepal	0	0	0
Total	26	42	109

=== Former members ===
- People's Socialist Party, Nepal

== Organization and structure ==
In mid July, it was announced that the Socialist Front would have party-like organization at district, provincial and national level. The central committee would have 16 members with four members from each party, including the party chair and general secretary from each party. Similarly, it was announced that there would be 12-member provincial committees with three members from each party, consisting of party chairs and general secretaries, while there would be eight-member district committees with a similar formation.

== List of past provincial governments ==
Province	Portrait	Chief Minister (Party)	Terms in Office			Legislature	Cabinet	Constituency
Province	Portrait	Chief Minister (Party)	Start	End	Tenure	Legislature	Cabinet	Constituency
Bagmati		Shalikram Jamkattel; CPN (Maoist Centre)	10 January 2023	23 July 2024	1 year, 195 days	2nd Provincial Assembly	Jamkattel, 2023	Dhading 1(B)
Lumbini		Jokh Bahadur Mahara; CPN (Maoist Centre)	5 April 2024	22 July 2024	108 days	2nd Provincial Assembly	Mahara, 2024	Rolpa 1(A)
Sudurpashchim		Dirgha Bahdur Sodari; CPN (Unified Socialist)	18 April 2024		109 days	2nd Provincial Assembly	Sodari, 2024	Kailali 4(B)

== Strength in provincial assemblies ==
Province	Seats	By party		Status in assembly
Koshi	17 / 93	13	Maoist Centre	In opposition
Koshi	17 / 93	4	Unified Socialist	In opposition
Madhesh	16 / 107	9	Maoist Centre	In opposition
Madhesh	16 / 107	7	Unified Socialist	In opposition
Bagmati	28 / 110	21	Maoist Centre	In opposition
Bagmati	28 / 110	7	Unified Socialist	In opposition
Gandaki	8 / 60	8	Maoist Centre	In opposition
Lumbini	12 / 87	11	Maoist Centre	In opposition
Lumbini	12 / 87	1	Unified Socialist	In opposition
Karnali	14 / 40	13	Maoist Centre	In opposition
Karnali	14 / 40	1	Unified Socialist	In opposition
Sudurpashchim	15 / 54	11	Maoist Centre	In opposition
Sudurpashchim	15 / 54	4	Unified Socialist	In opposition

== Leadership ==
=== Co-ordinator ===
- Madhav Kumar Nepal (2023–2024)
- Netra Bikram Chand (2024–2025)

== See also ==
- CPN (Maoist Centre)
- CPN (Unified Socialist)
