= Khadga (given name) =

Khadga is a Nepalese given name. Notable people with the name include:

- Khadga Prasad Sharma Oli, former Prime Minister of Nepal
- Khadga Bahadur Bishwakarma, Nepali politician
- Khadga Jeet Baral Magar, Nepali singer
- Khadgajeet Baral, Nepalese police officer
