= Khadga Bahadur Bishwakarma =

Nepali politician (born 1968)

Khadga Bahadur Vishwakarma
- खड्गबहादुर विश्वकर्मा
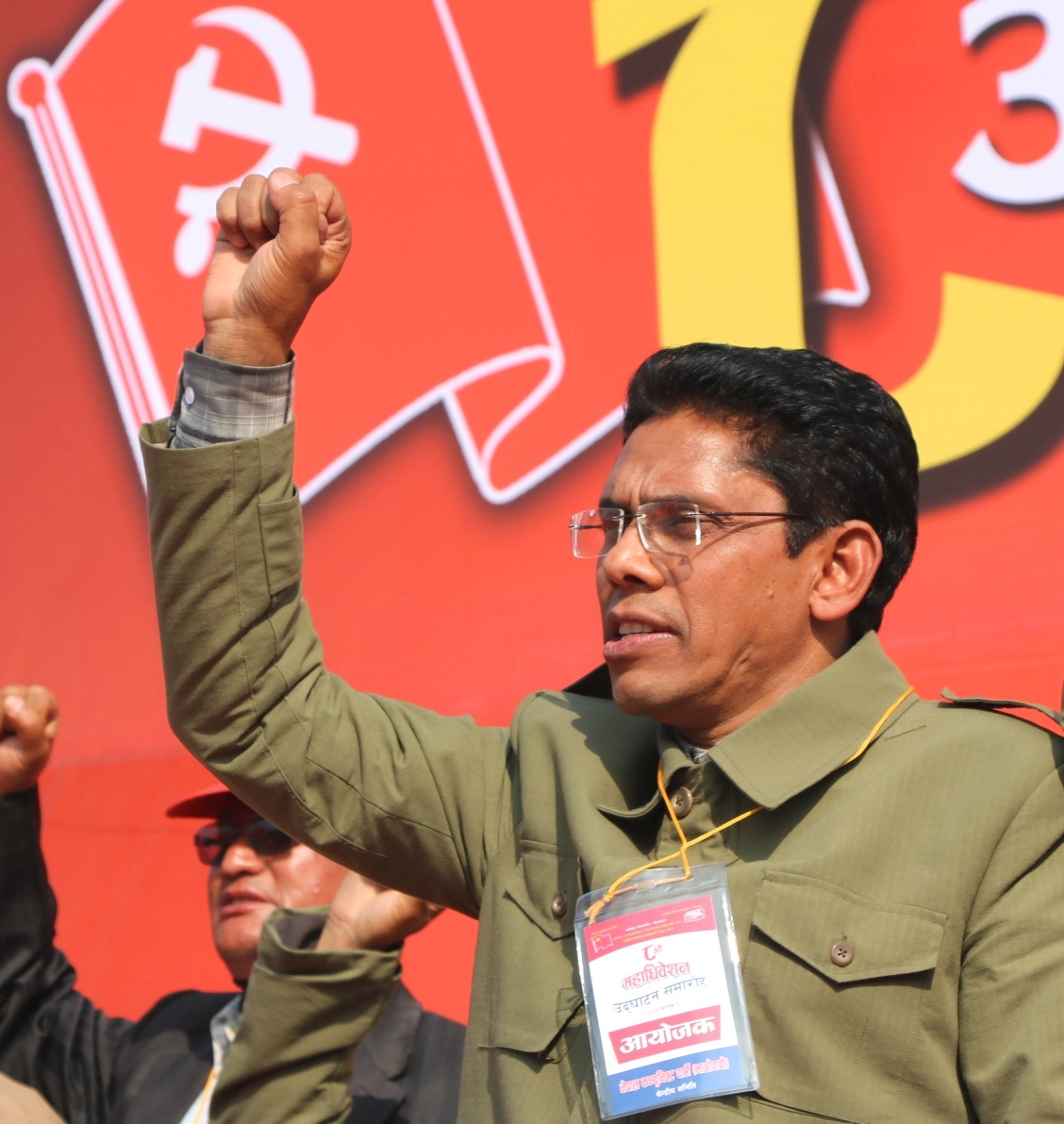
- Born: 17 May 1968 (age 58); Malkot, Kalikot, Nepal
- Other name: "Prakanda"
- Education: Nandadevi Secondary School, Kotbada-Kalikot (SLC); Surketh Education Campus
- Occupation: Politician
- Years active: 1986
- Notable work: Prakanda Collected Works-Part 1
- Political party: Communist Party Nepal
- Spouse: Nanda Kumal Vishwakarma
- Children: 3

Khadga Bahadur Bishwakarma (Nepali: खड्गबहादुर बिश्वकर्मा) alias Prakanda (प्रकाण्ड), born 17 May 1968 (२०२५ जेष्ठ ४ शुक्रवार), is a Nepalese communist politician and former Minister of Tourism and Civil Aviation of Nepal. He's also the spokesperson of Communist Party of Nepal, led by Netra Bikram Chand "Biplav".

== History ==
Vishwakarma was born in ward no 4 of Malkot VDC of klikot district in a low-middle class peasant family. He played vital role in western part of Nepal in 10-years-long (1996-2006 AD) guerrilla war (Peoples war) led by Communist Party of Nepal (Maoist) against the feudal monarchy political system. Which subsequently overthrown the 240 years long feudal monarchy and established republican system in Nepal.

In the 2008 Constituent Assembly election he was elected from Kalikot 1 constituency, winning 27629 votes. He was subsequently appointed as Minister of Tourism and civil aviation in the Cabinet headed by Mr. Jhalanath Khanal. Before that, in 2007 he was appointed as Minister of Women, Children and Social Welfare in the cabinet headed by late Girija Prasad Koirala.

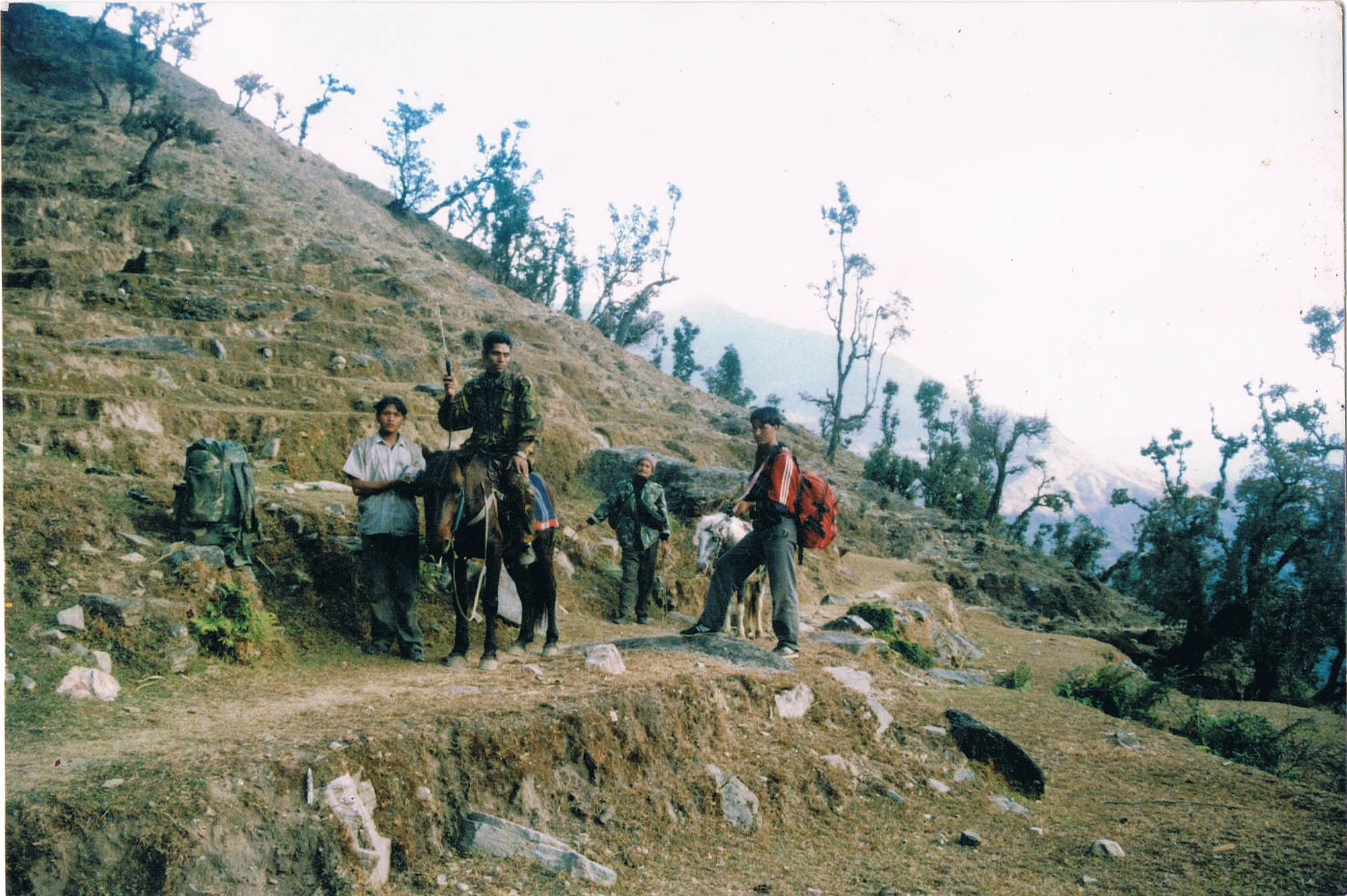
Travelling during People's War (1996-2006AD) in Western Nepal with his security force

== Electoral history ==
=== (Kalikot 1) ===
| Candidate | Party | Votes | % |
|---|---|---|---|
| Khadga Bahadur Bishwakarma | CPN (Maoist) | 27,629 | 50.95 |
| Hikmat Bahadur Bista | Nepali Congress | 11,241 | 20.73 |
| Tula Raj Bista | CPN (UML) | 9,238 | 17.04 |
| Nanda Bahadur Shahi | Nepal Workers Peasants Party | 2,394 | 4.41 |
| Man Bahadur Bam | Rastriya Prajatantra Party | 1,177 | 2.17 |
| Deep Bahadur Shahi | Rastriya Janashakti Party | 1,090 | 2.01 |
| Others | | 1,459 | 2.69 |
| Total | | 54,228 | 100.00 |
| Valid votes | | 54,228 | 95.74 |
| Invalid/blank votes | | 2,413 | 4.26 |
| Total votes | | 56,641 | 100.00 |
| Registered voters/turnout | | 80,252 | 70.58 |
| Majority | | 16,388 | |
| CPN (Maoist) gain | | | |
Source: Election Commission

== See also ==
- Communist Party Nepal
