= Communist Party of Nepal (Revolutionary Maoist) =

Nepalese political party founded in 2014

Communist Party of Nepal (Revolutionary Maoist) नेपाल कम्यूनिष्ट पार्टी (क्रान्तिकारी माओवादी)
- General Secretary: Mohan Baidya
- Founded: 19 June 2012
- Legalised: 12 July 2017 (Note: As Patriotic People's Republican Front)
- Dissolved: 7 April 2023
- Split from: UCPN (Maoist)
- Succeeded by: Revolutionary Communist Party of Nepal
- Headquarters: Kathmandu
- Electoral front: Patriotic People's Republican Front
- Ideology: Communism; Marxism–Leninism–Maoism
- Political position: Far-left
- International affiliation: ICOR

Election symbol

The Communist Party of Nepal (Revolutionary Maoist) (Nepali: नेपाल कम्युनिष्ट पार्टी (क्रान्तिकारी माओवादी)), abbreviated CPN (RM), was a Marxist-Leninist-Maoist party in Nepal. It was founded in June 2012 by the then vice-chairman of Unified Communist Party of Nepal (Maoist), Mohan Baidya after splitting from the party.

== History ==
=== Formation and first split, 2012–2014 ===
In June 2012, Mohan Baidya split off from UCPN (Maoist) along with 45 of 149 central committee members to form the Communist Party of Nepal–Maoist, also referred to as dash Maoists. He accused the party of being filled with opportunists and the leadership of destroying the achievements of the People's War. He also termed accepting the line of "democratic republic" in 2005 and signing the Comprehensive Peace Accord in 2006 as major mistakes by the Maoist leadership. The party boycotted the 2013 Nepalese Constituent Assembly elections and opposed the interim government led by Chief Justice Khil Raj Regmi that was conducting the elections. The party tried disrupting the elections detonating bombs in several places which resulted in the death of a child.

On 24 November 2014, party general secretary, Netra Bikram Chand "Biplav" along with 12 central committee members split from the party accusing Baidya of weak leadership and failure to lead the party to a new stage of revolution. The new party was formed on 29 November 2014 as the Communist Party of Nepal Maoist.

=== Revolutionary Maoist, 2015–2023 ===
The party merged with CPN (Unified) on 8 November 2015 and agreed to name the party CPN (Revolutionary Maoist). The party suffered another split on 14 May 2016 when a faction advocating for unification with the UPCN (Maoist) elected Ram Bahadur Thapa as the party chairman and decided to merge with the UCPN (Maoist) and other Maoist parties to form CPN (Maoist Centre).

The party joined electoral politics in 2017 and formed the Patriotic People's Republican Front, Nepal (Nepali: देशभक्त जनगणतन्त्रिक मोर्चा, नेपाल) as its electoral front under the leadership of Chandra Prakash Gajurel.

In April 2023 the CPN (Revolutionary Maoist) and the CPN (Majority) held a "Communist Unity Congress (Marxist-Leninist-Maoist)" and merged to form a new party, the Revolutionary Communist Party of Nepal.

== Ideology ==
The party had adopted the line of unified people's revolution. Scientific socialism is their political program. The party had also endorsed a political line of "new people's revolt" moving forward from the line of "people's war" from the previous Maoist party.

== Activities ==
In 2012, the Communist Party of Nepal issued a warning against the screening of Hindi films and operation of vehicles bearing Indian number plates in 10 districts, saying that anybody defying its ban will face the consequences. The party imposed the ban in the districts under the Tamsaling Ethnic State Committee, including Chitwan, Makwanpur, Dhading, and Kavre. It is claimed that the move was aimed at protecting national sovereignty.

As claimed, the party has banned the screening of Hindi movies and broadcast of Hindi songs in these districts in an attempt to promote Nepali films and songs. The ban on operation of vehicles with Indian number plates has also been imposed as a large number of such vehicles are found transporting agriculture goods from India, which has resulted in the domestic produce losing out the market in the country. The party has warned that anybody defying the ban will face the consequences.

Following the CPN's ban order, different broadcast media based in Chitwan and Makawanpur have stopped playing Hindi songs. Meanwhile, a delegation comprising representatives from the broadcast media based in the districts have urged the CPN's Chitwan District committee to withdraw the ban.

== Electoral performance ==
The party participates in elections as the Patriotic People's Democratic Front, Nepal.

Election	Leader	Votes		Seats	Position	Resulting government
Election	Leader	No.	%	Seats	Position	Resulting government
2017	Chandra Prakash Gajurel	13,944	0.15	0 / 275	21st	Extra-parliamentary

== See also ==
- Communist Party of Nepal (2014)
- Nepalese Civil War
