= Operation Romeo (disambiguation) =

Operation Romeo was a French World War II commando operation.

It may also refer to:

- Operation Romeo (Nepal), a Nepalese operation in 1995
- Operation Romeo-Sierra, a Spanish operation in 2002
- Operation Romeo (film), a 2022 film
