= Socialist Front =

Socialist Front may refer to:

- Socialist Front (Puerto Rico), a coalition of far-left and pro-independence political organizations
- Socialist Front (Malaysia) (Barisan Sosialis), a left-wing political party 1957−1969
- Socialist Front (Singapore) (Barisan Sosialis), a left-wing political party 1961−1988
- Socialist Front (Singapore, 2010), a current left-wing political party
- Socialist Front (Thailand), a left-wing political coalition 1974−1976
- Socialist Front (Nepal), a coalition of left parties in Nepal

== See also ==
- Malayan Peoples' Socialist Front, a defunct left-wing coalition of Malaysian socialist parties.
