= All Nepal Women's Association (Revolutionary) =

Political organisation in Nepal

The All-Nepal Women's Association (Revolutionary) (ANWA[R]) is a Nepalese women's political organization that is aligned with the ruling Communist Party of Nepal (Maoist).
