= Newa Rastriya Mukti Morcha, Nepal =

Newar organization

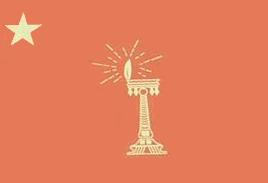
Flag of the Newa Rastriya Mukti Morcha, Nepal

Newa Rastriya Mukti Morcha, Nepal (नेवाः राष्ट्रिय मुक्ति मोर्चा नेपाल, 'Newar National Liberation Front, Nepal') is a Newar ethnic mass organization, aligned with the Unified Communist Party of Nepal (Maoist).

== Armed conflict ==
During the armed conflict, the organization was based in the Kathmandu Valley.

On April 26, 2005 the Kathmandu district chief of the Newa Rastriya Mukti Morcha, Shailendra Maskey ('Sunil'), surrendered to the Royal Nepalese Army.

On December 18-December 19, 2005 Newa Rastriya Mukti Morcha organized a transport blockade of the Kathmandu Valley, in protest of increasing oil prices.

== Post-war situation ==
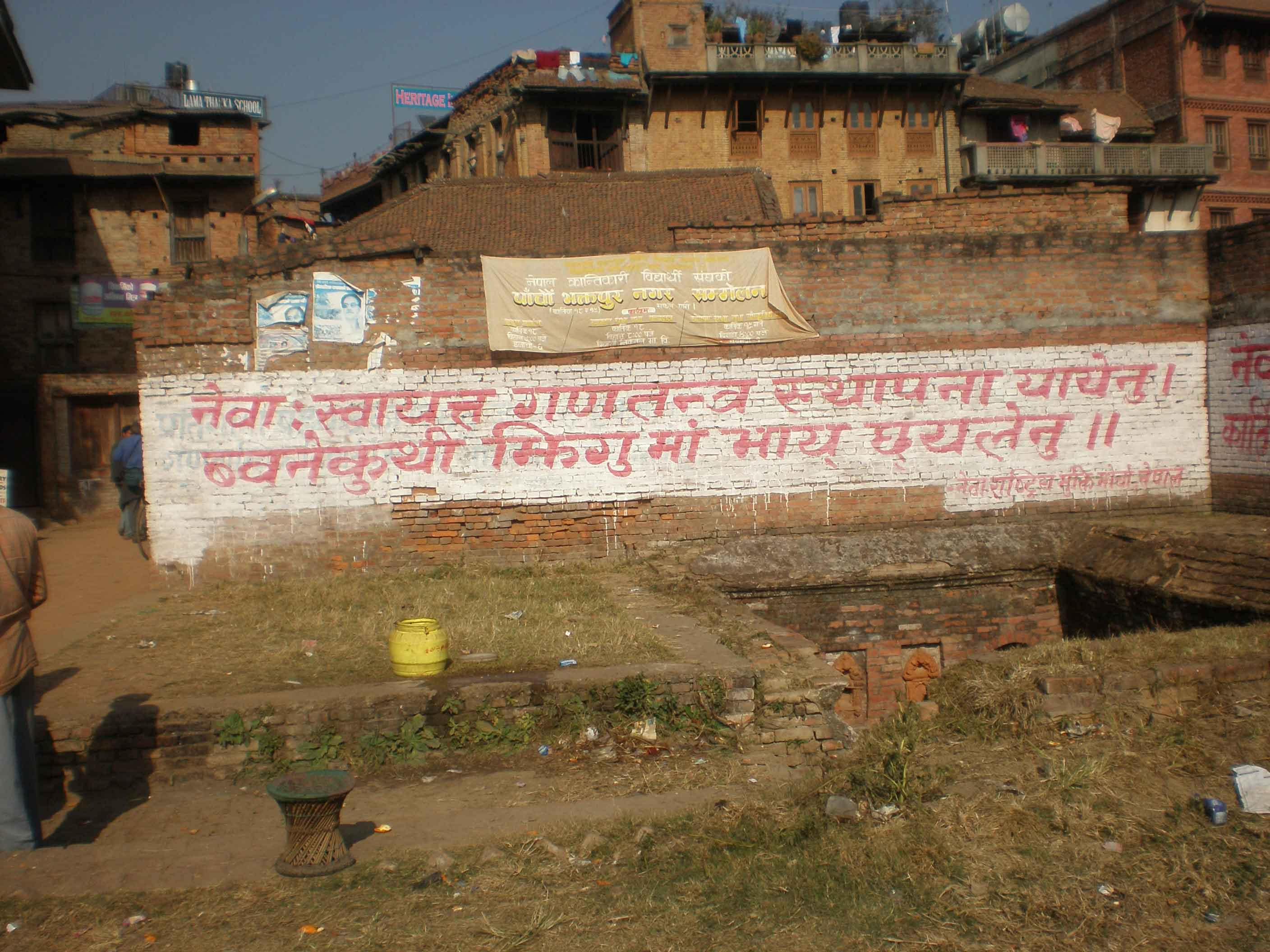
Mural of the Newa Rastriya Mukti Morcha in Bhaktapur, demanding Newar Autonomous Republic

In October 2006, as CPN(Maoist) launched its 'Operation Crime Control' (Operation CC) in the capital Kathmandu, the Newa Rastriya Mukti Morcha step up a telephone hotline, to gather information on criminal activities. During the campaign, a number of persons surrendered themselves to the Newa Rastriya Mukti Morcha. 'Crimals' were kept in custody by the Newa Rastriya Mukti Morcha. The organization also seized cars, motorcycles and fire-arms during the campaign. At the time of the campaign the Nepal office of the Office of the United Nations High Commissioner for Human Rights appealed that the Maoists would stop their 'law enforcement' activities.

On December 30, 2006 a 'Miss Newa' beauty pageant was organized in the capital Kathmandu, of which the Newa Rastriya Mukti Morcha was one of the sponsors. Previous, the Maoists had opposed beauty pageants and staged demonstrations against them.

The organization held its second national conference on March 15, 2007, at which Hit Man Shakya was elected chairman of the org of the Newa Rastriya Mukti Morcha. He was preceded by Paban Man Shrestha and Dilip Mahajan (who in 2004 had been arrested in Patna, India). Moreover, the conference elected the incumbent chairman Paban Man Shrestha as general secretary, Hisila Yami and Dilip Maharjan as vice-presidents, Suresh Shrestha as secretary and Basanta Shrestha as treasurer. The leading organ of the organization is its 57-member Central Working Committee.

== Policies ==
The Newa Rastriya Mukti Morcha works for the establishment of a 'Newar Autonomous Republic'. Moreover, the Morcha seeks to strengthen Nepal Bhasa (the Newar language).

The organization demands the adoption of Nepal Sambat as the national calendar of Nepal. The organization celebrated the Nepal Sambat 1128 New Year (2007 C.E.) by holding rallies in various locations.
