= Netra Bikram Chand =

Nepalese politician

- नेत्रबिक्रम चन्द
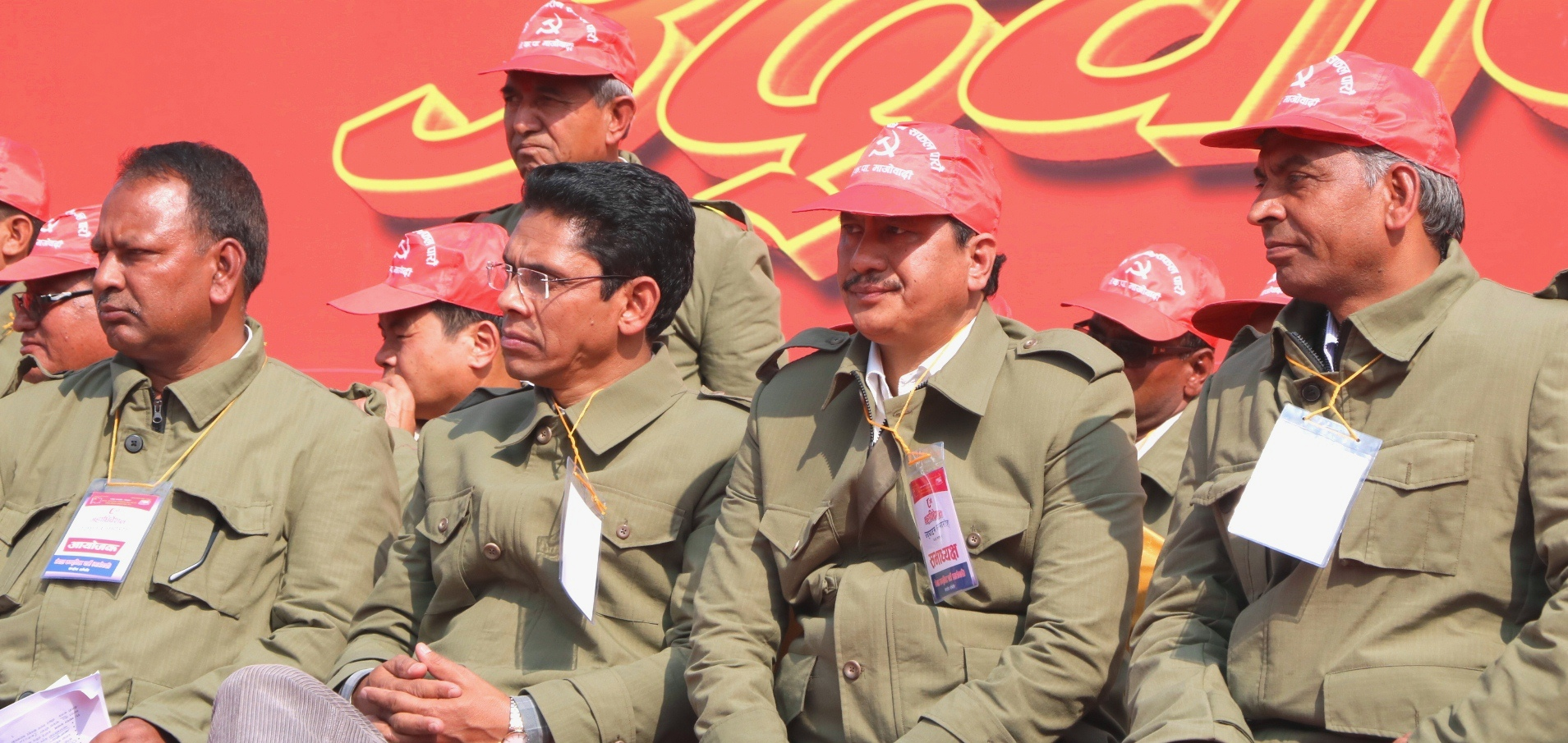
- Biplav (second from right) with fellow hardline CPN leaders

General Secretary of Communist Party Nepal (Maoist)
- Incumbent
- Assumed office 2025

Personal details
- Party: Communist Party Nepal(Maoist)
- Other political affiliations: Communist Party of Nepal; Communist Party-Fourth Convention; Communist Party-Masal; Communist Party-Mashal; Communist Party-Unity Centre; Communist Party-Maoist Centre; Communist Party-Revolutionary Maoist
- Nickname: Biplav C

Netra Bikram Chand (Nepali: नेत्रविक्रम चन्द), known as Biplav C (विप्लव सी), is a Nepalese communist politician and rebellion leader. He's the chairman of Communist Party Nepal.

== Political life ==
He together with fellow Maoist leader Ram Bahadur Thapa (Badal), were the two main militia commanders of Prachanda in the Nepalese Civil War (1996-2006). Chand separated from CPN Maoist and became the chairperson of Communist Party of Nepal in 2014. He waged an armed struggle against the government until 2020 when a peace deal was signed.

In 2017, he led the boycott of the 2017 Nepalese legislative election. In February 2018, the Biplav led faction cancelled the tour of Bollywood actor Salman Khan by quoting it as "expansion of cultural intervention on Nepali soil". In February 2019, Biplav led the bombings of Ncell at Nakhu. On 28th Falgun 2075, the government of Nepal (Council of Ministers) declared the Biplav faction as "criminal and destructive faction" and all the members and anyone helping the faction as illegal and punishable. Nepali Times considers Biplav as similar to Prachanda in the Nepalese civil war Government of Nepal has been actively engaged against the activities of Biplav. Writer Kunda Dixit argues that Biplav could gain the public support if the government continues human rights abuses on the faction of Biplav.

Biplav was removed as General Secretary and expelled from the CPN on May 4, 2021 for breach of party discipline, and for supporting engagement in elections, which the CPN Central Committee saw as revisionism.

== See also ==
- Communist Party Nepal
