= Sector Kanda =

1986 failed uprising by the Communist Party of Nepal

Sector Kanda (Nepali: सेक्टर काण्ड, 'Sector Incident') is the name given to a failed attempt to launch an armed uprising in Nepal in 1986. It was organized by the Communist Party of Nepal (Mashal), one of the precursors of the Communist Party of Nepal (Maoist). The 'Sector Kanda' represented the first experience of armed struggle of the precursor organizations of the Communist Party of Nepal (Maoist), prior to the launching of People's War ten years later.

== April 1 actions ==
Under the leadership of Mohan Baidya ('Kiran') the Communist Party of Nepal (Mashal) adopted Maoism as its ideological line. As part of the new line, the party called for armed struggle, seeking to ignite a mass popular uprising against the panchayat regime, and for boycott of the panchayat elections. On April 1, 1986 the statue of King Tribhuvan at Tripureshwor in the capital Kathmandu was painted black and a number of police posts were attacked by the party. The April 1 actions, which became known as 'Sector Kanda', sought to derail the election process.

== Aftermath ==
Contrary to the expectations of the party leadership, the April 1 actions failed to inspire popular militancy. On the other hand, the action revealed the underground activities of the party. A number of Mashal party cadres were arrested. When the Central Committee of the party analyzed the Sector Kanda events, they concluded that the actions had been a mistake as they had exposed the underground networks of the party. As a result, Baidya resigned as party general secretary. He was replaced Pushpa Kamal Dahal (then known by the party name 'Biswas', later commonly known as 'Prachanda').
