= Communist Party of Nepal (Maoist) (2025) =

Communist Party of Nepal (Maoist) नेपाल कम्युनिस्ट पार्टी (माओवादी)
- Abbreviation: CPN (Maoist)
- General Secretary: Netra Bikram Chand ("Biplav")
- Spokesperson: Khadga Bahadur Bishwakarma
- Founder: Netra Bikram Chand, Khadga Bahadur Bishwakarma
- Founded: 2014
- Registered: 18 November 2025
- Split from: CPN–Maoist
- Ideology: Communism; Marxism–Leninism
- Political position: Far-left

Election symbol

Website
- thecpn.org

The Communist Party of Nepal (Maoist) (Nepali: नेपाल कम्युनिस्ट पार्टी (माओवादी)) is a political party in Nepal led by Netra Bikram Chand ("Biplav"). It was formed in 2014 from a split in the Communist Party of Nepal (Revolutionary Maoist), and was originally known as just the Communist Party of Nepal. The party registered with the election commission under its current name on 18 November 2025. The party's election symbol is the rose.

== History ==
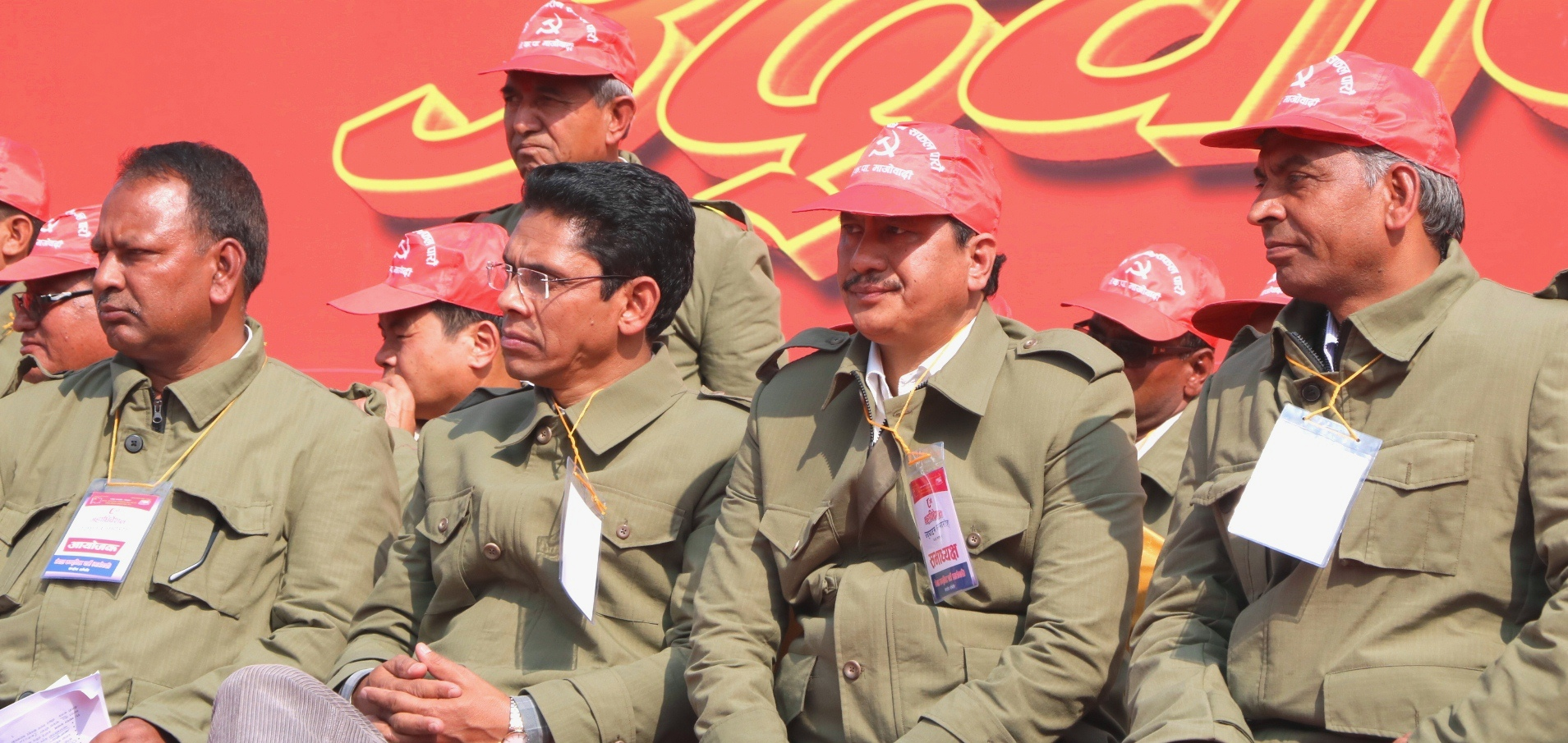
Party leaders in front from left to right: Hemanta Prakash Oli ("Sudarshan"), Khadga Bahadur Bishwakarma ("Prakanda"), Netra Bikram Chand ("Biplav"), and Dharmendra Bastola ("Kanchan")

In 2012, a faction of the Unified Communist Party of Nepal (Maoist) led by Mohan Baidya broke from the party and formed the Communist Party of Nepal (Revolutionary Maoist). Baidya himself faced a split in 2014, when a party faction led by Netra Bikram Chand (better known as "Biplav") splintered off and formed the Communist Party of Nepal, releasing a statement which read in part: "The Maoist revolt had grossly perverted by the time it arrived in Kathmandu from Rolpa. It is not possible to unite with the party that has strayed from the Maoist ideology."

Biplav's party supported the Nepalese government's efforts against India's 2015–16 blockade of Nepal, but has otherwise been critical of Kathmandu due to the party's marginalization from media and absence from parliament. Party cadres have targeted cellphone towers of Ncell, causing disruptions in service in Dang District, and have shut down commercial traffic.

The party has led numerous strikes since its foundation. It called for a nationwide, peaceful protest against a bilateral agreement between India and China over the Lipulekh Pass, which Nepal also claims. However, the party's calls were ignored.

The party registered with Nepal's election commission as the "Communist Party of Nepal (Maoist)" on 18 November 2025.

== See also ==
- List of communist parties in Nepal
