= Chandra Prakash Gajurel =

Nepali politician

Personal details
- Party: Revolutionary Communist Party Of Nepal Chandra Prakash Gajurel Shortly Known as CP Gajurel Take Name = Gaurav General Secretary of Revolutionary Communist Party Of Nepal

Chandra Prakash Gajurel "Prakash" (Nepali: चन्द्रप्रकाश गजुरेल, born 29 April 1948) is a Nepalese political activist who is a member of the Political Bureau of the Communist Party of Nepal (Maoist) (CPN-M). His alias is "Comrade Gaurav".

The Unified Communist Party of Nepal (Maoist) (UCPN-M) split in June 2012 following the dissolution of the Constituent Assembly, and Gajurel joined the breakaway hardliner faction of Mohan Baidya "Kiran", the CPN-M.

== See also ==
- People's War in Nepal
- Politics of Nepal
- List of communist parties in Nepal
