= United National People's Movement =

United National People's Movement (in Nepali: Samyukta Rashtriya Janaandolan) was a coalition of Communist Party of Nepal (Mashal), Communist Party of Nepal (Masal), Nepal Marxist-Leninist Party, Proletarian Labour Organisation, Nepal Communist League and the Nand Kumar Prasai faction during the popular uprising of 1990. UNPM was created in opposition to the United Left Front, arguing that the ULF-Nepali Congress had sold out the protest movement in making compromises with the regime. UNPM called for a Constituent Assembly.
