= Communist Party of Nepal (Masal) (1983) =

Communist Party of Nepal (Masal) नेपाल कम्युनिष्ट पार्टी (मसाल)
- Founder: Mohan Bikram Singh
- Founded: 1983
- Dissolved: 2001
- Split from: CPN (Fourth Convention)
- Succeeded by: CPN (Unity Centre–Masal)
- Ideology: Communism; Marxism–Leninism–Maoism
- Political position: Far-left

The Communist Party of Nepal (Masal) was a communist party in Nepal. CPN (Masal) was formed in 1983, following a split in the Communist Party of Nepal (Fourth Convention). The party was led by Mohan Bikram Singh.

== History ==
In March 1984, CPN (Masal) along with different Marxist–Leninist and revolutionary parties from four continents formed the Revolutionary Internationalist Movement in France.

In 1985, the party split with Mohan Baidya forming his own Communist Party of Nepal (Mashal). Masal retained the RIM membership for some time. Masal was sometimes nicknamed Patalo Masal ("Thin Masal") to differentiate it from Moto Mashal ("Thick Mashal"), i.e. Masal. Following the split, the Masal group was also known as the Communist Party of Nepal (Mashal–COC). At the time of the mass upsurge against the monarchic dictatorship, Masal, Mashal and Communist Party of Nepal (Marxist-Leninist-Maoist) joined hands and formed the United National People's Movement as a common front. In 1991, a minority broke led by Baburam Bhattarai broke away from CPN (Masal) and joined the Communist Party of Nepal (Unity Centre).

CPN (Masal) took part in the Joint People's Agitation Committee, which had called for a general strike on 6 April 1992. Violence erupted in the capital during the strike, and according to the human rights NGO HURON 14 people were killed in police firing.

In 1999, CPN (Masal) split, as a group led by Deena Nath Sharma broke away and formed a parallel Communist Party of Nepal (Masal). Sharma's group called for boycott of elections and support to armed struggle led by Communist Party of Nepal (Maoist). It later merged with the Maoists in 2001.

At the party convention held on 1–5 December 2001, CPN (Masal) decided to merge with Communist Party of Nepal (Unity Centre). The merger became effective in early 2002, and the Communist Party of Nepal (Unity Centre-Masal) was formed.

== Ideology ==
The party considered Nepal as a semi-feudal and semi-colonial country. The party identified the proletariat, peasants (ranging from poor to rich), petty bourgeoise and national capitalists as friendly classes, and saw feudal landlords and comprador-bureaucratic capitalists as class enemies.

== See also ==
- List of communist parties in Nepal
