= Communist Party of Nepal (Mashal) =

Far-left political party in Nepal from 1984 to 1991

Communist Party of Nepal (Mashal) नेपाल कम्युनिष्ट पार्टी (मशाल)
- Founder: Mohan Baidya
- Founded: 1984
- Dissolved: 1991
- Split from: CPN (Masal)
- Succeeded by: CPN (Unity Centre)
- Ideology: Communism; Marxism–Leninism
- Political position: Far-left

The Communist Party of Nepal (Mashal) was an underground communist party in Nepal. CPN (Mashal) was formed in November 1984, following a split in the Communist Party of Nepal (Masal). The new party was founded at a congress (labelled the 'fifth congress') in Gorakhpur, India. It was difficult to identify any major ideological difference between the two factions, and probably the split was caused by dissatisfaction with Singh's authoritarian leadership methods. Mohan Baidya (alias 'Kiran') became general secretary of the new party. Other Central Committee members elected at the Gorakhpur conference were Chitra Bahadur K.C., Ramsingh Shris, Bhairav Regmi, Govindsingh Thapa, Pushpa Kamal Dahal, Khambasingh Kubar, Bachaspati Devkota, C.P. Gajurel, Dev Gurung, Ishwari Dahal, Bishnu Pokhrel and Bhakta Bahadur Shrestha.

In 1986 CPN (Mashal) reformulated its ideology from 'Marxism–Leninism–Mao Zedong Thought' to 'Marxism–Leninism–Maoism'. The same year the party initiated a failed armed insurrection, which became known as The Sector Incident. A few police posts were attacked in the capital and a statue of King Tribhuvan was painted black. Later this incident was criticized within the party ranks on the grounds that the identity of the party had been revealed, eventually leading to the resignation of Mohan Baidya and others in the party leadership.

In 1986 Pushpa Kamal Dahal (party name Prachanda) was named general secretary of the party.

During the popular uprising against the royal regime in 1990, CPN (Mashal) and CPN (Masal) united around the United National People's Movement.

In 1991 CPN (Mashal) merged with Communist Party of Nepal (Fourth Convention), and formed Communist Party of Nepal (Unity Centre).

== Social analysis ==
The party considered Nepal as a semi-feudal and semi-colonial country. The party identified the proletariat, peasants (ranging from poor to rich), petty bourgeoise and national capitalists as friendly classes, and saw feudal landlords and comprador-bureaucratic capitalists as class enemies.

== See also ==
- List of communist parties in Nepal
