= Nepal Communist League =

The Nepal Communist League (Nepali: Nepal Samyabadi Sangh) was a communist organisation in Nepal. NCL was led by Shambhuram Shrestha. Shrestha, who had been a central secretariat member of the original Communist Party of Nepal, broke away from Man Mohan Adhikari's faction in the mid-1970s.

During the Jana Andolan, the 1990 popular uprising against the monarchy, the group formed part of the radical United National People's Movement. NCL took part in the Joint People's Agitation Committee, which had called for a general strike on April 6, 1992. Violence erupted in the capital during the strike, and according to the human rights NGO Huron, 14 people were killed in police firing.

Ahead of the local body election that year, the Nepal Communist League formed a front together with the Samyukta Janamorcha Nepal, Nepal Workers Peasants Party, Communist Party of Nepal (Marxist-Leninist-Maoist) and Communist Party of Nepal (15 September 1949). The group merged into the Communist Party of Nepal (Unified Marxist-Leninist) during the 1990s.

== See also ==
- List of communist parties in Nepal
