= Operation Romeo (Nepal) =

Nepal police operation

- Part of Causes of Nepalese Civil War
- Location: Rolpa District, Rapti Zone, Mid-Western Development Region (now part of Lumbini Province, Nepal); 28°22′N 082°33′E
- Commanded by: Khum Bahadur Khadka
- Target: Maoist sympathizers
- Date: November 1995
- Executed by: Kingdom of Nepal: Nepal Police
- Outcome: 6,000 people displaced, human rights abuses, rape and torture, 132 arrested
- Casualties: 12 deaths
- Location within Lumbini Province Location within Nepal

Operation Romeo (Nepali: अपरेशन रोमियो) was a Nepal Police operation that aimed to suppress the Maoist movement in Nepal. Taking place in November 1995, it resulted in human rights abuses, the arrests of 132 people, the displacement of 6000 locals, and rape and torture on an unknown scale. More than twelve people died during the course of the operation, and severe violence against locals took place. No perpetrators were arrested. The operation was one of the causes of the Nepalese Civil War, which began three months later in February 1996.

== Background ==
In the events leading toward the Nepalese Civil War (1996–2006), many conflicts between the police and citizens took place in the Rolpa District and the Rukum District. In 1991-92, Maoists successfully created a political frontier in Rolpa which led to the government crackdown on communist arrivistes. Subsequently, many political workers, employees, and teachers were arrested and tortured. However, the Maoists believed that government-led violence worked in their favor as this created many sympathizers.

In September 1995, the members of the Communist Party of Nepal (Maoist Centre) were planning on launching the "People's War" with their ideologies as democracy and removing feudalism. The hilly districts of Rolpa and Rukum were used for preparation for the war, and in November these campaigns came to the government's attention which sought to suppress the movement. Home minister Khum Bahadur Khadka, with the Nepali Congress-led government, created an operation code-named "Romeo"; named after the district of Rolpa.

== Operation ==
In early November 1995, Operation Romeo was carried out by the Nepal Police to "win the heart and minds of the people". It took place mainly in Rolpa District; but Dang District, and Rukum District were also affected. Chuda Bahadur Shrestha commanded the operation with 2,200 armed police personnel. The operation was said to have been launched to control the criminal activities, though Human Rights Watch called it an "operation focused on trying to dislodge the militant Maoist presence in the area". Operation Romeo led to human rights abuses, rape and torture on an unknown scale, the arrests of 132 people, and the displacement of 6,000 locals. More than twelve people died during the course of the operation, and severe violence against locals took place. No perpetrators were arrested.

== Aftermath ==
During a televised interview, Khum Bahadur Khadka explained that "the police had acted against persons indulging in anti-monarchical activities." However, outside observers viewed the operation as a crackdown on anti-governmental activities. As a result of the brutal operation, many locals became Maoist sympathizers and became convinced that the government was their opponent. Baburam Bhattarai described the operation as a "reign of terror against the poor peasants".

Three months later, the Nepalese Civil War was declared by the Maoists. One author stated that this operation was not the root of the war: "The Romeo Operation helped accelerate the conflict, which might otherwise have taken a lengthy period of preparation, but the assertion that Operation Romeo was a core cause of the conflict is not accurate".
