= Sisne Rural Municipality =

Rural municipality in Lumbini Province, Nepal

Sisne (Nepali: सिस्‍ने गाउँपालिका Sis‍nē Gāum̥pālikā) is a rural municipality in Eastern Rukum District of Lumbini Province Province of Nepal.

== Demographics ==
At the time of the 2011 Nepal census, Sisne Rural Municipality had a population of 18,083. Of these, 99.9% spoke Nepali and 0.1% Sign language as their first language.

In terms of ethnicity/caste, 47.0% were Chhetri, 25.3% Magar, 10.2% Kami, 6.4% Thakuri, 4.7% Hill Brahmin, 4.0% Damai/Dholi, 1.6% Sarki, 0.3% Newar, 0.3% Badi, 0.3% Newar, 0.1% Gurung, 0.1% Sunuwar and 0.2% others.

In terms of religion, 97.9% were Hindu, 1.6% Christian, 0.3% Buddhist and 0.2% others.

In terms of literacy, 62.7% could read and write, 3.1% could only read and 34.1% could neither read nor write.
