= Mohan Baidya =

Nepali politician

- मोहन वैद्य

Chairman of Communist Party of Nepal Revolutionary Maoist
- Incumbent
- Assumed office 2008
- Preceded by: office established

Personal details
- Party: Communist Party of Nepal (Revolutionary Maoist)

Mohan Baidya (Nepali: मोहन वैद्य) is a Nepalese political activist who is the chairman of the Communist Party of Nepal Revolutionary Maoist, a party formed in 2012 by a splinter group from the Nepal Communist Party - Maoist Unified Communist Party of Nepal (Maoist).

Baidya became the leader of the Communist Party of Nepal (Mashal), when that party was formed in 1985.

In 1986, Mohan Baidya was acting as General Secretary of the CPN (Mashal) when he called for an armed uprising against King Birendra. These attempts were ultimately unsuccessful leading to the arrest of several revolutionaries known as the Sector Incident. It saw Baidya face severe internal criticism culminating in his resignation and replacement with Pushpa Kamal Dahal.

Baidya was not included during the Nepalese Civil War peace process as he was serving time in Indian prison. He later voiced criticism of the decisions made by Maoist representatives during the agreements.

== Political positions ==
In an interview in 2018, Baidya expressed concerns over the excessive consumption of liquor by the indigenous Janajati people, although stressed that his focus is centered mainly on economic reform, land rights & redistribution, fair prices for produce, fair wages and loan regulation. He expressed disapproval over political factionalism within the communist parties of Nepal, and wishes to see unity.
