= Communist Party of Nepal (Maoist Centre) =

Political party in Nepal

Communist Party of Nepal (Maoist Centre) नेपाल कम्युनिस्ट पार्टी (माओवादी केन्द्र)
- Founder: Pushpa Kamal Dahal; Baburam Bhattarai
- Founded: 1994 as CPN (UC) (in parallel with original one); 1996 as CPN (Maoist); 2009 as Unified CPN (Maoist); 2016 as CPN (Maoist Centre); 8 March 2021 (second iteration)
- Dissolved: 17 May 2018 (first iteration); 4 November 2025 (second iteration)
- Split from: CPN (Unity Centre)
- Succeeded by: NCP (first iteration; 2018–2021); NCP (second iteration; majority); PraLoPa (minority)
- Headquarters: Perisdanda, Koteshwor, Kathmandu
- Ideology: Communism; Marxism–Leninism–Maoism–Prachanda Path; Left-wing nationalism
- Political position: Far-left
- International affiliation: RIM (defunct); CCOMPOSA (defunct)
- Alliance: Samajbadi Morcha
- Colours
- Slogan: "Let us march ahead on the path of struggle towards establishing the people's rule by wrecking the reactionary ruling system of the state"
- Armed wing: People's Liberation Army, Nepal (dissolved after peace agreement)

Election symbol

Party flag

Website
- cpnmc.org

The Communist Party of Nepal (Maoist Centre) (Nepali: नेपाल कम्युनिस्ट पार्टी (माओवादी केन्द्र), romanized: Nēpāla Kamyunisṭa Pārṭī (Mā'ōvādī Kēndra)), abbreviated CPN (Maoist Centre) or CPN (MC), was a major political party in Nepal. The party was dissolved automatically when the central committee announced a merger with eight other communist parties and groups to form the Nepali Communist Party. On the other hand, a group led by party joint general secretary Janardan Sharma including Ram Karki, Anjana Bisankhe and Sudan Kirati formed the Progressive Campaign, Nepal, alleging that the party leadership had left their ideological base for a "musical chair of leadership."

Pushpa Kamal Dahal has served as the leader of the party since its foundation. The party held 32 seats in the House of Representatives, making them the third-largest parliamentary group. Dahal served as Prime Minister of Nepal as part of a ruling coalition following the 2022 general election for almost one-and-a-half years to 2024 July. The party has previously led three governments; in 2008 and 2016 under Dahal, and in 2013 under Baburam Bhattarai.

The party was formed in 1994 with the same name as its parent party Communist Party of Nepal (Unity Centre); it was renamed as the Communist Party of Nepal (Maoist) in 1996. After the Communist Party of Nepal (Unity Centre–Masal) and its electoral front, Janamorcha Nepal, merged with the party in 2009, the unified party came to be known as the Unified Communist Party of Nepal (Maoist). The party emerged in its current state in 2016 following the unification of various splinter groups with the party.

The party was dissolved on 17 May 2018, after merging with the Communist Party of Nepal (Unified Marxist–Leninist) to create the Nepal Communist Party; however, it was revived on 8 March 2021 following a Supreme Court ruling in favor of Rishi Kattel, who had claimed the Nepal Communist Party name. The party claimed to have 750,000 members as of December 2021, making them the third-largest party in Nepal by membership.

== History ==
=== Founding (1994–1996) ===
The party was formed in 1994 following a split in the Communist Party of Nepal (Unity Centre) into two factions, one led by Pushpa Kamal Dahal and the other led Nirmal Lama. The electoral front of the party, the United People's Front of Nepal, also split and the faction led by Baburam Bhattarai allied with the Pushpa Kamal Dahal led Communist Party of Nepal (Unity Centre). The two United People's Front of Nepal decided to register itself with the Election Commission, but the commission only recognized the Nirmal Lama-backed party. Baburam Bhattarai responded by calling for a boycott of the 1994 mid-term elections.

=== Preparations for struggle (1995–1996) ===
The Unity Centre, led by Pushpa Kamal Dahal, went completely underground after the split to begin preparations for its next phase of struggle. The party held its Third Plenum in March 1995, where the party renamed itself to the Communist Party of Nepal (Maoist). It also decided that for "the true liberation of the people, all efforts must be concentrated for the development of a people's war that would usher in the new people's democratic form of government" and officially decided to give up its policy of taking part in parliamentary elections.

The March meeting was followed by six months of preparations to recast the old organizational structure into a fighting machine, and in September 1995, the 'Plan for the Historic Initiation of the People's War' was adopted by the Central Committee of the party. There then began a series of public meetings all over the country under the aegis of the United People's Front of Nepal as part of the final politico-ideological preparation. The party launched the 'Sija campaign' in Rolpa and Rukum, named after the Sisne and Jaljala mountains in the two districts, to propagate the ideology of Marxism–Leninism–Maoism.

In October 1995, during the Sija campaign, a fight broke out between supporters of the United People's Front of Nepal and other parties, mainly the Nepali Congress and the Rastriya Prajatantra Party, at a village in the eastern part of Rukum. The newly formed government under Sher Bahadur Deuba moved swiftly to arrest the UPFN supporters, accusing them of creating public disorder. The police then launched 'Operation Romeo' in November 1995. Officially, Operation Romeo was labeled as an operation to control a rise in criminal activities in Rolpa. Operation Romeo resulted in gross violations of human rights, including the arbitrary arrest and detention of hundreds of members of left-of-center parties, rapes, executions and "disappearances". In the light of this action, the Political Bureau of the Central Committee of the party met briefly in January 1996 and made the final decision on the historic initiation of the 'People's War' for 13 February 1996.

On 4 February 1996, Baburam Bhattarai led a three-member delegation of the United People's Front of Nepal to present a memorandum to Prime Minister Sher Bahadur Deuba. The memorandum warned that unless the government took initiative to fulfill their 40-point demands by 17 February the UFPN would launch an armed revolution.

=== People's war (1996–2001) ===
On 13 February 1996, after Prime Minister Sher Bahadur Deuba had left for a state visit to India two days before, the office of the Small Farmer's Development Programme run by the Agricultural Development Bank was overrun in Gorkha district and the loan papers were destroyed. This was followed in the evening by attacks on police posts in Aathbiskot-Rari in Rukum, Holeri in Rolpa and Sindhuligadhi in Sindhuli. The 'People's War' was formally launched.

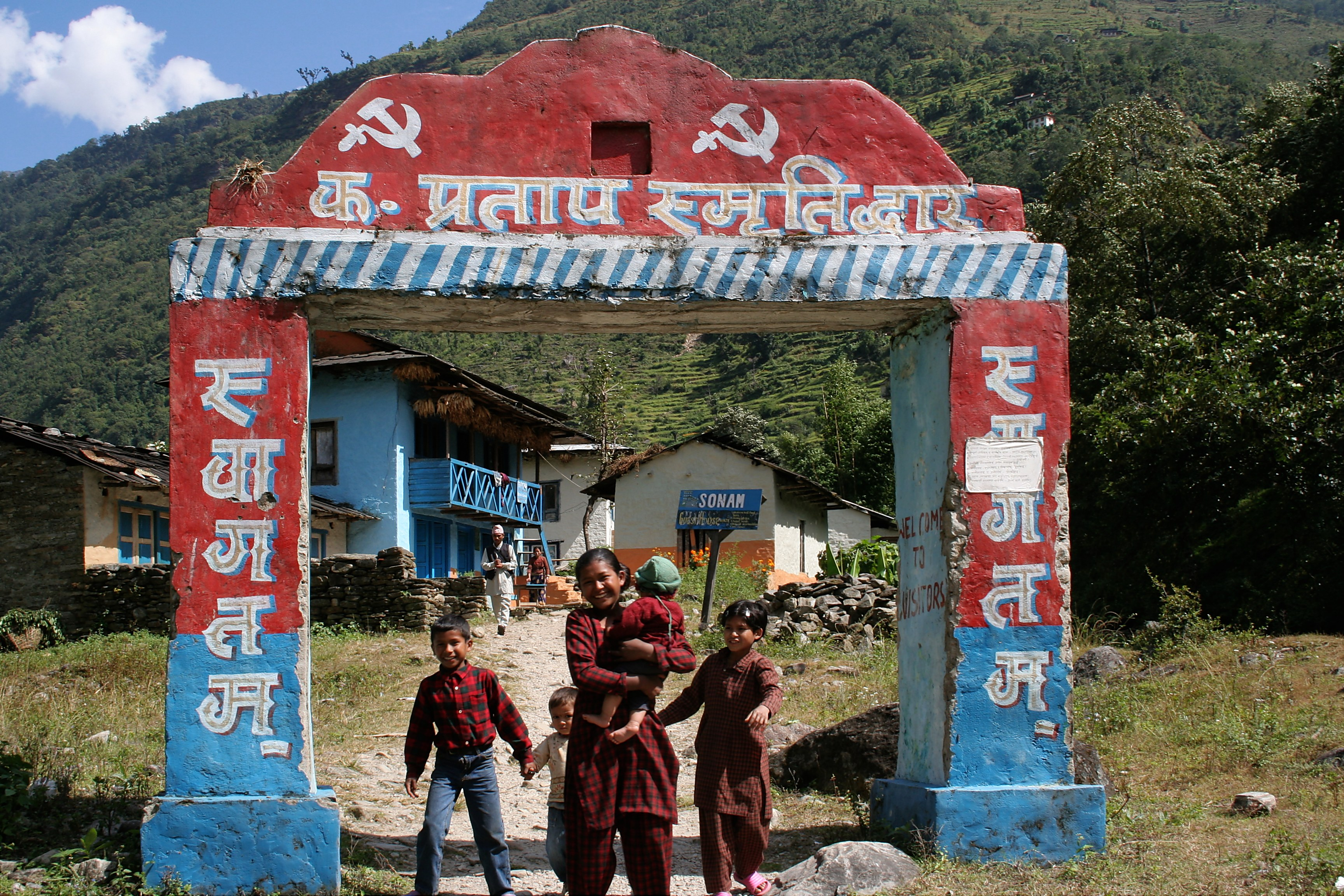
Rit Bahadur Khadka (Pratap) Memorial Gate

After the Communist Party of Nepal (Unified Marxist–Leninist) came into government in 1997, violence between both sides stopped but the issue could not be resolved. The government formed a taskforce to look into the 'Maoist Activities and a Search for Solutions' in April 1997 under CPN (UML) MP Prem Singh Dhami but the commission report was ultimately shelved in August of the same year. A local election was called in May 1997, but polls could not be held in 87 village development committees due to intimidation by the Maoists. The government in response attempted to introduce the Terrorist and Destructive Activities (Control and Punishment) Act in July 1997 at the initiative of deputy prime minister and home minister Bam Dev Gautam. The act would give the police wide-ranging powers against perceived 'terrorists'. But the government was forced to backtrack on the law before it was placed in front of the parliament owing to mass protests from the civil society, the media, and international organizations.

On 13 February 1998, the second anniversary of the 'people's war', the Maoists announced the existence of a Central Military Commission under Prachanda. By May 1998, 51 village development committees in Rolpa district and western Nepal were under Maoist control and they were operating a parallel administration called the 'People's Government'. When the new Prime Minister Girija Prasad Koirala went on tour of the Maoist influenced area he realized that the situation was getting out of hand. After an attack on Kalikatar in Tanahun, the home district of the home minister, Govinda Raj Joshi, the state moved swiftly and launched the 'Kilo Serra II'. The operation was meant to be a 'search and kill' operation to prevent Maoist movement from gaining strength. Unlike Operation Romeo, which was concentrated on the western hills, 'Kilo Serra Two' was spread out across all the Maoist controlled regions of the country. From mid-1998 an unprecedented number of Maoists and their supporters—as well as civilians caught in the middle—were killed. Almost five hundred people were killed under 'Kilo Serra Two'.

During the elections in 1999, the Maoists simply called for a boycott and did not disrupt the polls. In December 1999, the Krishna Prasad Bhattarai government formed the 'High-Level Committee to Provide Suggestions to Solve the Maoist Problem' under Sher Bahadur Deuba, and two months later authorised it to hold talks with the Maoists. Contact was established with the Maoist leadership, and the response was positive. A letter by Prachanda to a government intermediary stated that three minimum conditions need to fulfilled before any high-level negotiations and that they would cease all operations during this time. The conditions were, reveal the whereabouts of a central committee member of the CPN–Maoist along with others who had 'disappeared', initiate moves to release arrested workers and sympathizers; and end state terrorism and begin process to investigate the incident of arson and killing in Rukum district. After Krishna Prasad Bhattarai resigned and was replaced by Girija Prasad Koirala, the new prime minister declared: 'The first priority of the government will be to restore law and order in the country to protect lives of the people.'

Following this an 'Armed Nepal Bandh' was announced for 6 April 2000 and attacks on the police resumed. In late September, the Maoists overran Dunai, the district headquarters of Dolpa. Following this attack the Royal Nepal Army was mobilized for security duty in 16 districts. The army could not be brought to the fight against the Maoists, however, due to disagreements between the Prime Minister and the King of Nepal, the supreme commander of the Royal Nepal Army.

Girija Prasad Koirala came in contact with the Maoist leadership during this time and the deputy prime minister, Ram Chandra Paudel, met with a Central Committee member of the CPN–Maoist. The breakthrough came to be a naught in the end as the government released a top Maoist leader after having him renounce his party at a press conference. In February 2001, informal talks with the government and the Maoists almost began but the Maoists backed out, asking for a postponement. Then on February 26, they announced that they had just conducted their second national conference and Pushpa Kamal Dahal was elected chairman. Furthermore, it was announced that the guiding ideology of the party will become Marxism–Leninism–Maoism–Prachanda Path.

In March 2001, the government published the names of 294 individuals who were in police custody charged with being sympathizers and members of the CPN–Maoist. Then in early April 2001, without any warnings, the Maoists carried out devastating attacks in police posts in Rukum and Dailekh districts within a week of each other, killing 70 policemen. The Maoists also announced that no negotiations would be held with the government until Girija Prasad Koirala stepped down. On 7 July 2001, the birthday of the new king Gyanendra, 41 policemen were killed by the Maoists in Gulmi, Lamjung and Nuwakot districts. Later that month, they attacked a police post in Rolpa and took 69 policemen hostage. The Koirala government immediately mobilized the army but when the soldiers failed to engage with the Maoists, Koirala resigned as Prime Minister. Sher Bahadur Deuba followed him as prime minister and immediately announced a ceasefire, which was reciprocated by the Maoist side with a ceasefire of their own.

=== People's Liberation Army (2001–2002) ===
In mid-August 2001, a meeting between the mainstream communist parties and the CPN–Maoist was arranged by the Communist Party of Nepal (Masal) near Siliguri, but nothing significant emerged from this meeting since Prachanda's request for support on the Maoist call for a republic was turned down. The first official meeting between the government and the Maoists were held on August 30, 2001, led by deputy prime minister Chiranjibi Wagle and Krishna Bahadur Mahara from the Maoist side. Nothing substantial happened during this meeting except for mutual commitment to hold talks again. Two weeks later, the second was held in western Nepal and the Maoists placed a full range of demand on the table. These demands were of three categories. The first was calls for a constituent assembly, an interim government and a republic. The second dealt with treaties with India and policies regarding India. The third was going public with details of arrested Maoists and a rollback of police operations.

The parliament passed the Armed Police Force Act, 2001 in August 2001 for the formation of an Armed Police Force to counter the Maoists as the Royal Nepal Army could only be mobilized by the king, who was the supreme commander of the army. In September 2001, the 'people's army' was restructured into the 'People's Liberation Army' and was under the supreme command of Prachanda. The PLA consisted of the bulk of the Maoist guerrilla fighting force, which was estimated anywhere between 5,000 and 10,000 strong. The Maoists also had a militia, who were assigned guard duty in Maoist-controlled village development committees.

Before the third round of talks were going to held, the government scrapped the Public Security Regulations and freed 68 prisoners, while the Maoist side gave up their calls for a republic and an interim government. The third round of talks were held on 13 November 2001 but was inconclusive as demands for a constituent assembly was rejected by the government, a call backed by other political parties.

The Maoists ended the four month-long ceasefire on 23 November 2001 by attacking government and private installations throughout the country after a statement two days earlier by Prachanda which signaled that talks were about to break down. The Maoists also attacked army barracks for the first time. The Maoists attacked Ghorahi in Dang and briefly took control of the district headquarters. They killed more than two dozen police and army personnel, blew up government offices, freed prisoners from the local jail and stole NPR 64.8 million worth of gold and silver from local banks. This coincided with attacks all over the country the most serious of which was in Syangja where 14 policemen were killed. This was followed two days later by an attack on the headquarters and army barracks in Solukhumbu District. The attack on the headquarters was unsuccessful but they made out with a substantial amount of ammunition and sophisticated weapons from their attack on the army barracks. The party also announced the formation of a 37-member United Revolutionary People's Council of Nepal and was headed by Baburam Bhattarai.

Following this the prime minister, Sher Bahadur Deuba, imposed a state of emergency and promulgated an anti-terrorist ordinance that labeled the CPN (Maoist) a terrorist organization. After failure to increase the time period for the state of emergency, King Gyanendra on the recommendation of the prime minister dissolved the parliament in May 2002 and buoyed by the success against the Maoist insurgents, decided to call for elections in November of the same year. But following a surprise attack in Sandhikharka in Arghakhanchi District which killed 65 security personnel, the prime minister asked for more time to conduct the polls. The king promptly removed Deuba in October 2002 for his 'incompetence' and assumed the country's executive authority.

=== King's direct rule (2002–2006) ===
On 26 January 2003, the Maoists killed the Inspector General of the Armed Police Force, Krishna Mohan Shrestha, his wife and a bodyguard during a morning walk. After the government decided to retract the terrorist label, bounties and a red corner notice against the Maoists, another ceasefire was announced on 29 January 2003. The peace talks between the government and the Maoists resumed on 27 April 2003, led by deputy prime minister Badri Prasad Mandal and Baburam Bhattarai from the Maoists. Another round of talks were held on 10 May 2003, following which the government decided to restrict army movement to five kilometres from their barracks, forming a code of conduct during the ceasefire and releasing some top Maoist leaders. After the government released key members of the Maoist party the third round of talks finally began on 17 August 2003. The ceasefire was broken on 27 August 2003 by Prachanda, after the two groups could not agree on the formation of a constituent assembly.

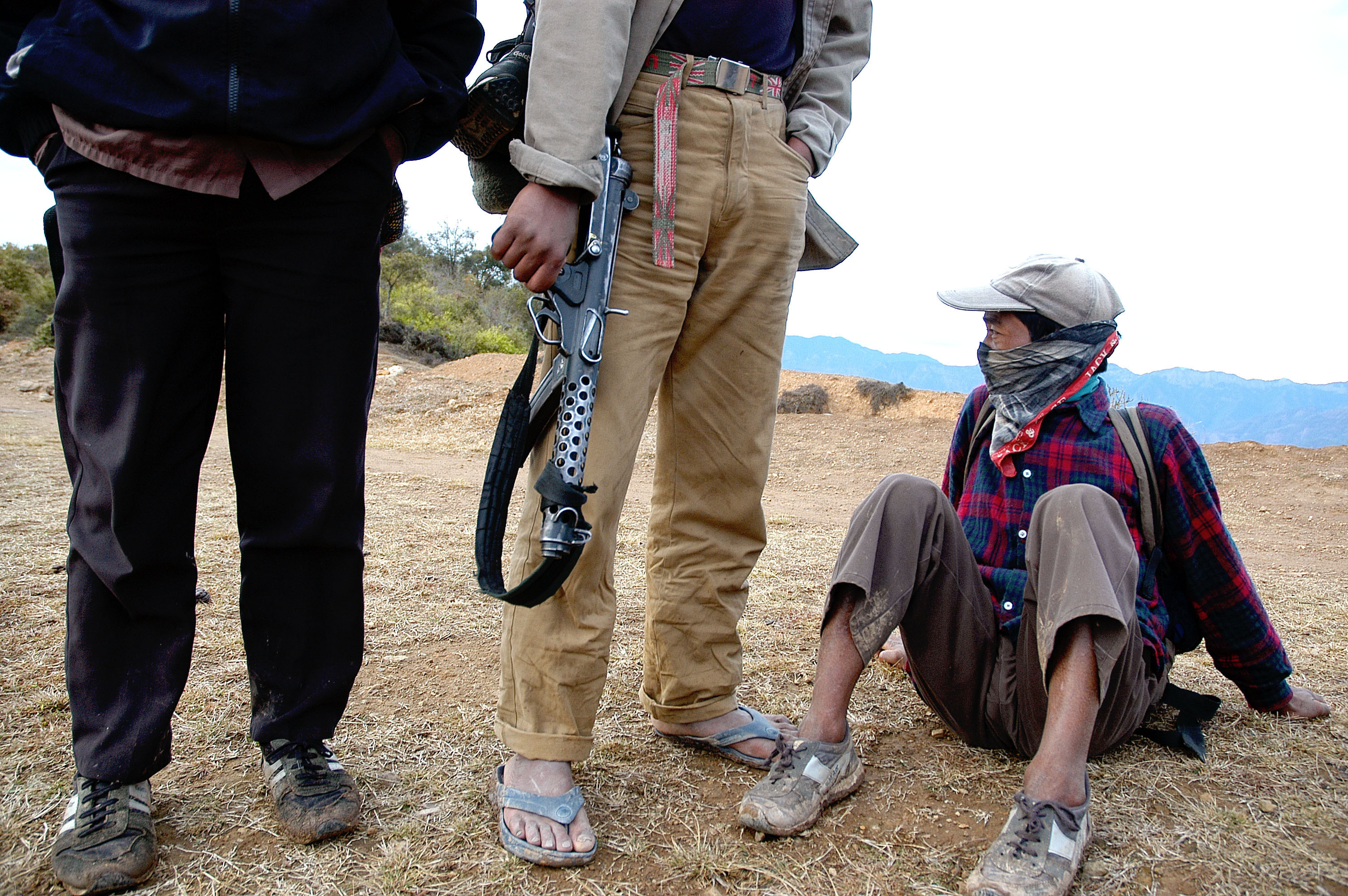
People's Liberation Army members in Rolpa District, 2005

Although there were intermittent ceasefires, fighting was roughly continuous through 2005. In 2005, the CPN (Maoist) sought a different strategy of seeking permanent peace accords while forming a pro-democratic alliance with several other mainstream political parties in opposition to the monarchical dictatorship of King Gyanendra. Following massive popular uprisings and protests (some involving over a million people), a prolonged general strike in 2006, and several violent clashes between protesters and the Nepalese Army, the monarchy finally capitulated. The CPN (Maoist) gained international legitimacy as they agreed to lay down arms and participate in the new electoral process. In the aftermath of the conflict, several western European powers removed the CPN (Maoist) from their government's terrorist lists. In 2012, the US State Department followed suit and delisted the CPN (Maoist) as a "terrorist organization", citing the party's "...credible commitment to pursuing peace and reconciliation...".

=== Comprehensive Peace Accord (2006–2008) ===
After waging the Civil War for 10 years, the CPN (Maoist) sat down for peace talks after the success of the People's Movement in 2002/03. The Twelve-Point Agreement reached between the then seven-party alliance and the Maoist rebels in Delhi created a path for peaceful agitation against the direct rule of the king and to end autocracy in Nepal. The civil war conducted by the CPN (Maoist) created the foundation for the establishment of a republic in Nepal. It also created political consciousness among the people at the grassroots level and, to some extent, awareness of the need for national socio-economic transformation.

After the declaration of the king to reinstate the parliament, the CPN (Maoist) insisted that the declaration was a betrayal to the people. Instead the king should bring down his institution for his deeds. But there was no hearing from the other parties in the alliance. Maoist chairman Prachanda appeared at the prime minister's residence, Baluwatar for the peace talk and said that he was there to establish a new kind of democracy in Nepal, although he did not reveal details.

After the peace talks held between the CPN (Maoist) and the Government of Nepal, the Maoist rebels were ready to put an end to the 10-year-long Civil War. Signing the Comprehensive Peace Accord, Maoist chairman Prachanda said that the Civil War had come to an end and a new revolution was to be waged by the reinstated parliament. The peace accord was signed on 21 September 2006, ending the Maoist revolution. However, Prachanda was able to provide legacy to the 19,000-member People's Liberation Army that was kept in the cantonment under the supervision of the United Nations Mission in Nepal (UNMIN).

The interim constitution of Nepal 2063, gave a constitutional position to these Maoist cadres. There was a provision for providing monthly allowance for the Maoist armies staying at the cantonment. The Maoist leaders believe that the revolution has not ended here but only the form of struggle was changed.

=== First Constituent Assembly (2008–2012) ===
In the 2008 Constituent Assembly elections, the CPN (Maoist) won 220 seats and an additional nine members were nominated from the party giving them a strength of 229 seats and making them the largest party in the 1st Constituent Assembly. Despite accusations of fraud from older parties like the Nepali Congress and CPN (Unified Marxist–Leninist), international observers reported that the elections were held in a peaceful, orderly manner and were satisfying. The Maoists did not have a majority to form the government and had to form a coalition with CPN (Unified Marxist–Leninist) and Madheshi Jana Adhikar Forum, Nepal. Chairman of the party Pushpa Kamal Dahal was elected prime minister after getting 464 out of 577 votes against Nepali Congress candidate Sher Bahadur Deuba. As the first proposal of the first meeting of this Constituent Assembly received full support, it was declared that the monarchy of Nepal has ended forever and the monarchy that has been in power for 240 years has been formally ended and Nepal has become a federal democratic republic.

On 13 January 2009 the party merged with the CPN (Unity Centre–Masal) to form the Unified Communist Party of Nepal (Maoist). The election front of CPN (Unity Centre–Masal), Janamorcha Nepal also merged into the party and with its eight seats took the Maoists' total strength to 237 in the Constituent Assembly. The Maoist government fell after its coalition partners withdrew support from the government after Dahal tried to sack the army chief, Rookmangud Katuwal. President Ram Baran Yadav rejected Dahal's proposal to sack the army chief and he resigned on 4 May 2009. After the Maoist government fell, a faction under Matrika Prasad Yadav split from the party and reformed the former CPN (Maoist). Matrika Prasad Yadav and Jagat Prasad Yadav also resigned from the Constituent Assembly and were replaced from among the party list.

In February 2011 the Maoists formed a coalition with the CPN (Unified Marxist–Leninist) and formed a government under UML's Jhala Nath Khanal. The government could not agree a deal to complete the integration of former Maoist combatants and Khanal resigned on 15 August 2011 to pave the way for a formation of a national consensus government. Almost two weeks later, Baburam Bhattarai was elected prime minister defeating Ram Chandra Paudel from the Nepali Congress 340–235. The government under Bhattarai was able to get finalize a deal to integrate the former Maoist guerrillas and a deal was signed with all major parties on 1 November 2011. However, hardliners inside the party like party vice-chairman Mohan Baidya were unsatisfied with the decision.

The government, however, failed to agree a consensus on the drafting of the new constitution and on 28 May 2012, Baburam Bhattarai requested President Ram Baran Yadav to dissolve the Constituent Assembly and call for fresh elections. On 18 June 2012, party vice-chairman Mohan Baidya split the party and formed the Communist Party of Nepal–Maoist. He accused the party of being filled with opportunists and the leadership of destroying the achievements of the People's War. He also termed accepting the line of "democratic republic" in 2005 and signing the Comprehensive Peace Accord in 2006 as major mistakes by the Maoist leadership. Baburam Bhattrai resigned as prime minister and on 14 March 2013, Chief Justice Khil Raj Regmi was appointed as an interim prime minister to hold the elections.

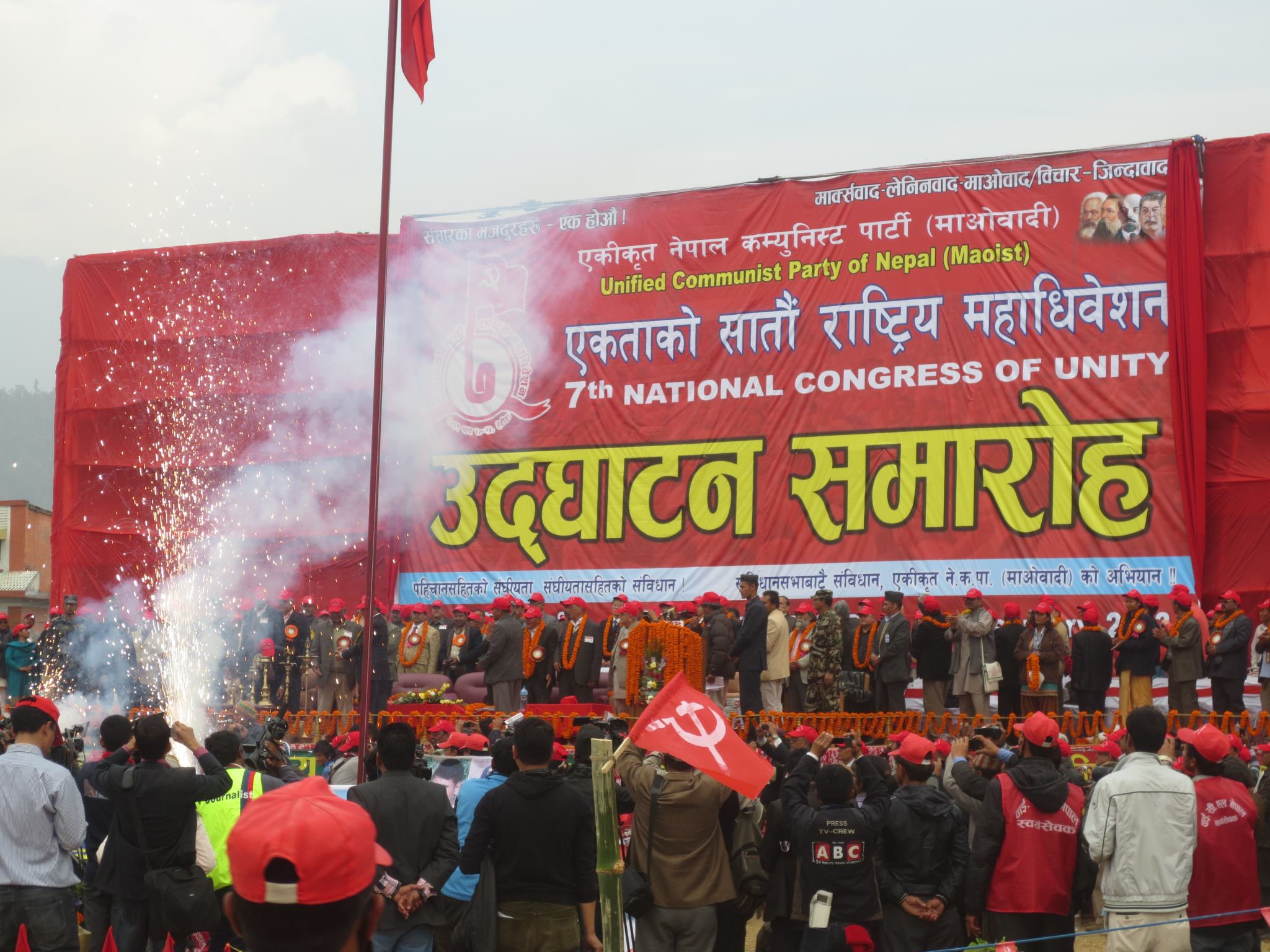
UCPN (Maoist) 7th General Convention, 6 February 2013

=== Second Constituent Assembly (2013–2015) ===
In the 2013 Constituent Assembly election, held on 19 November 2013, the UCPN (Maoist) won just 80 seats and an additional 3 seats were nominated from the party to the 2nd Constituent Assembly compared to 237 in the 1st Constituent Assembly. The result meant that the Maoists were dropped to be the third-largest party in the Constituent Assembly from first in past. The party rejected the results and blamed it on an "international and national" conspiracy and warned that the party would sit out of the newly elected Constituent Assembly.

The party later agreed to join the new constituent assembly and Onsari Gharti Magar from the party was elected as the vice-chairman of the Constituent Assembly on 26 February 2014. Nepali Congress president Sushil Koirala became the new prime minister of Nepal but the Maoists did not join his government. The new Constituent Assembly was finally able to deliver a constitution and on 17 September 2015, the Constitution of Nepal, 2015 was approved by 507 members. Baburam Bhattarai resigned from the newly formed Legislature Parliament of Nepal and the party following the announcement of the constitution and formed Naya Shakti Party, Nepal.

=== Federal Republic and dissolution (2016–2018) ===
Pushpa Kamal Dahal became prime minister for the second time on 3 August 2016, before resigning on 25 May 2017 to make way for Sher Bahadur Deuba to become prime minister as per an agreement with Nepali Congress. On 19 May 2016, 10 Maoist parties including pro-unity factions from the Communist Party of Nepal (Revolutionary Maoist) and Communist Party of Nepal and the Matrika Prasad Yadav-led Communist Party of Nepal (Maoist) merged with the party. The party renamed itself to Communist Party of Nepal (Maoist Centre) following the merger.

In the 2017 local elections, the party won 5,411 seats including 106 mayor and chair positions of 753 becoming third largest. The party won the mayoral post in only one metropolitan city, Bharatpur with the support of Nepali Congress and Renu Dahal (daughter of Puspa Kamal Dahal) became mayor.

The party announced an alliance with the Communist Party of Nepal (Unified Marxist–Leninist) before the start of the 2017 legislative and provincial elections but did not quit the government led by Sher Bahadur Deuba. The party won 53 seats and again emerged as the third-largest party in the House of Representatives. The party also won 108 seats to provincial assemblies and formed coalition governments with the CPN (UML) in six out of the seven provinces. According to the power sharing agreement, Maoist Centre would lead the government in Karnali and Sudurpashchim. The party also formed a coalition government with the Communist Party of Nepal (Unified Marxist–Leninist) to lead the federal government. In the National Assembly elections on 6 February 2018, the party won 12 of the 56 elected seats. Nanda Bahadur Pun was also re-elected as vice-president of Nepal on 19 March 2018.

On 17 May 2018, the Party Unification Coordination Committee decided to dissolve both coalition parties in order to create a merger party, the Nepal Communist Party.

=== Revival (2021–present) ===
On 8 March 2021, Nepal's Supreme Court stated that the allocation of the name "Nepal Communist Party" upon the merger of the CPN (UML) and CPN (Maoist–Centre), and by extension the merger itself, was void ab initio, as the name was already allotted to a party led by Rishiram Kattel, and that the NCP stood "dismissed". Upon the ruling, the two predecessor parties were revived in their original state immediately prior to the merger, although should the two wish to merge again with proper procedure being followed, it would be fully allowed.

==== 2021 split ====
The party faced a split when the MPs Prabhu Sah, Gauri Shankar Chaudhary, Lekhraj Bhatta, Deputy prime minister Top Bahadur Rayamajhi) and two National Assembly members (including Ram Bhadur Thapa) split from the party and joined the CPN (UML), along with nine provincial assembly members. Two mayors and three rural municipality chairpersons also left the party and joined the CPN (UML).

== Ideology ==
The Maoists launched a 'People's War' on 13 February 1996, under the slogan: "Let us march ahead on the path of struggle towards establishing the people's rule by wrecking the reactionary ruling system of state." Maoists strongly believe in the philosophy of Mao Zedong who proclaimed, "Political power grows out of the barrel of a gun." Maoists also draw inspiration from the 'Revolutionary Internationalist Movement', Peru's left wing guerrilla movement—the Sendero Luminoso (Shining Path), and from radical communist parties in different parts of the world.

The Maoists' aims in the 'People's War' were to establish a 'People's Democracy' in Nepal. The Maoists view it as an "historical revolt against feudalism, imperialism and reformists." The catalyst for declaring the 'People's War' was the failure of the Nepalese government to respond to a memorandum presented by its representatives to Prime Minister Sher Bahadur Deuba on 4 February 1996. The memorandum listed 40 demands related to "nationalism, democracy and livelihood". These included the abolition of royal privileges, the promulgation of a new constitution, and the abrogation of the Mahakali Treaty with India, which regulated the distribution of water and electricity as well as the delineation of the border between the two countries.

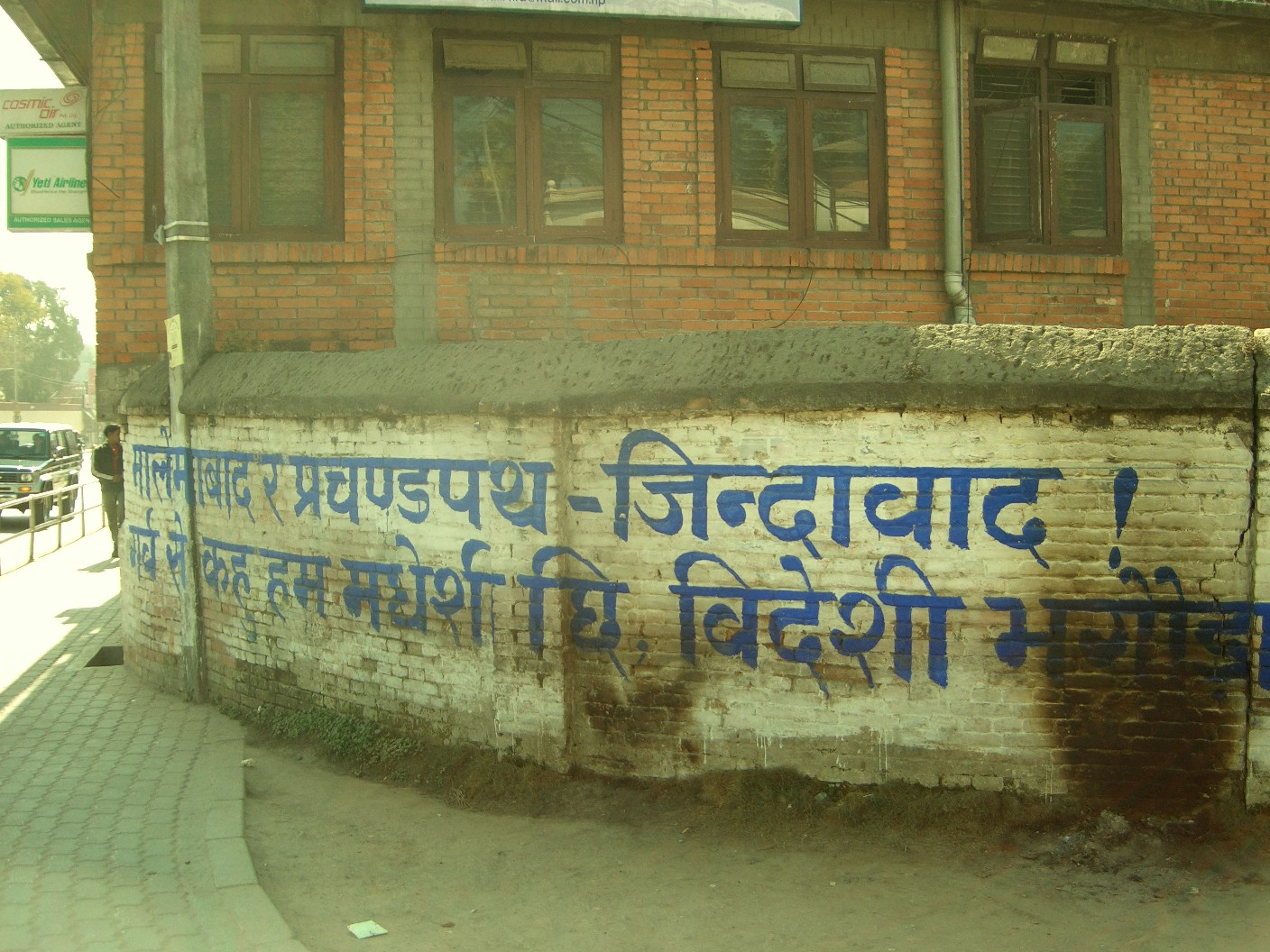
"Long Live Marxism–Leninism–Maoism and Prachanda Path" mural in Kathmandu made by the Madhesi Rashtriya Mukti Morcha

In second conference of the CPN (Maoist), a post for chairman was created for the Maoist chief Prachanda. Until then, the chief of the organization had been its general secretary. A report titled "The great leap forward: An inevitable need of history" was presented by Prachanda. This report was in serious discussion in the central committee and the top leaders of the party. Based on this report, the CPN (Maoist) adopted Prachanda Path as its ideology. After five years of armed struggle, the party realized that none of the proletarian revolutions of the past could be carried out on Nepal's context. So, having analyzed the serious challenges and growing changes in the global arena, and moving further ahead than Marxism, Leninism and Maoism, the party determined its own ideology, Prachanda Path.

Prachanda Path in essence is a different kind of uprising, which can be described as the fusion of a protracted people's war strategy which was adopted by Mao in China and the Russian model of armed revolution. Professor Lok Raj Baral, in his writing about Prachanda Path says that this doctrine doesn't apparently make an ideological break with Marxism and Leninism but finds that these doctrines' strategies aren't able to be replicated in Nepal as it was done in the past. Most of the Maoist leaders think that the adoption of Prachanda Path after the second national conference is what nudged the party into moving ahead with a clear vision ahead after five years of "people's war".

Senior Maoist leader Mohan Vaidya alias Kiran says, "Just as Marxism was born in Germany, Leninism in Russia and Maoism in China, Prachanda Path is Nepal's identity of revolution. Just as Marxism has three facets—philosophy, political economy and scientific socialism, Prachanda Path is a combination of all three totally in Nepal's political context." The adoption of Prachanda Path was inspired truly from the Shining Path. In fact, the bringing up of new doctrine worked out with the concept of giving a new identity to Nepal's revolution. Talking about the party's philosophy, Maoist chairman Prachanda says, "The party considers Prachanda path as an enrichment of Marxism, Leninism and Maoism." After the party brought forward its new doctrine, the government was trying to comprehend the new ideology, Prachanda Path.

== Women in the party ==
Women have been prominent in the recruiting profile. Available reports indicate that one-fifth to one-third of the cadre and the combatants during the Nepalese Civil War may be women. Reportedly, every village under Communist Party of Nepal (Maoist) control had a revolutionary women's organization. According to a Jane's Intelligence Review report of October 2001, there were usually two women in each unit of 35–40 men, and they were used to gather intelligence and act as couriers. Baburam Bhattarai was quoted as saying in Spacetime on 18 April 2003, that 50 percent of cadres at the lower level, 30 percent of soldiers and 10 percent of members of central committee of the outfit were women. Durgha Pokhrel, then Chairman of National Women's Commission, who visited more than 25 Communist Party of Nepal (Maoist) controlled districts, stated on 3 July 2003, during a talk delivered at the Nepal Council of World Affairs that percentage of women cadres could be as high as 40. A women's group, the All-Nepal Women's Association (Revolutionary), is alleged to be a front outfit of the CPN–M.

== Criticism ==
=== Use of children ===
During the Nepalese Civil War, the Communist Party of Nepal (Maoist) resorted to mass under-age recruitment, particularly of young students, usually between 12 and 16 years old. At the conclusion of the war, an estimated 12,000 Communist Party of Nepal (Maoist) soldiers were below 18 years of age, and Human Rights Watch estimates that the majority of the current militia joined as minors. The United Nation Mission in Nepal (UNMIN) has verified that there were nine thousand child soldiers in Communist Party of Nepal (Maoist) cantonment training camps.

The Communist Party of Nepal (Maoist) used children as soldiers, messengers, cooks, porters and suppliers. Regardless of role, all children received rudimentary military training concerning explosives, so they would be able to recognize and avoid land mines. The current Communist Party of Nepal (Maoist–Centre), however, continues to deny that any of its soldiers during the war were less than 18 years of age. They also claim that they have cared for orphans of adult soldiers killed in the war, and that these children were not placed in danger.

=== Links with fraternal parties ===
According to available information, the Maoists of Nepal have well-established linkages with Indian revolutionary communist organizations, primarily with the Communist Party of India (Maoist), currently leading a protracted "people's war" throughout the subcontinent. The first signs of contacts were reportedly registered during 1989–1990, when the two groups started collaborating in order to expand their influence. According to Indian government analysis, they began the process of laying a corridor, which is now widely referred to as the Revolutionary Corridor (RC) extending from Nepal to across six Indian states, comprising Bihar, Chhattisgarh, Jharkhand, Andhra Pradesh, Odisha and Madhya Pradesh. This entire area has been identified in Maoist literature as the Compact Revolutionary Zone (CRZ). The CRZ was organized by the Nepal and Indian members of the Naxalite movement, in a meeting at Siliguri in the Indian State of West Bengal during August 2001. Indian Maoists are known as Naxalites (or Naxals) in reference to a popular uprising that began decades ago centered in the village of Naxalbari.

Nepalese Maoists had sent their delegates to the March 2001 Congress of PWG held at Abuz Marh in the Bastar region of Chhattisgarh. The establishment of CRZ gave a wider space and platform for all the proscribed Nepal and Indian Naxalite organizations to strengthen their bases in both the countries.

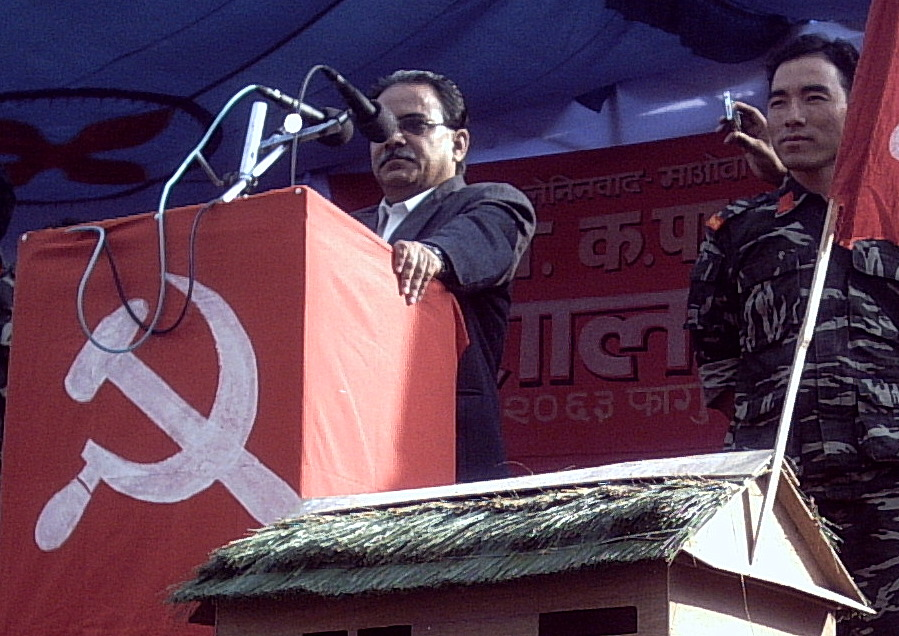
Pushpa Kamal Dahal: current party chairman and former Prime Minister of Nepal

The CPN (Maoist) is a participating organization of the Revolutionary Internationalist Movement (RIM), a global association of revolutionary communist parties. In July 2001, ten regional Maoist groups formed the Coordination Committee of Maoist Parties and Organisations of South Asia (CCOMPOSA), in which the Nepalese Maoists, PWG, MCC, Purbo Banglar Sarbahara Party (Bangladesh), Communist Party of Ceylon (Sri Lanka) and other Indian communist parties became members. The appearance of graffiti in remote villages in Naxalite strongholds, in Rayakal and Mallapur mandals (administrative unit) of Karimnagar district in Andhra Pradesh, hailing CCOMPOSA points the spread of the idea of a common front of revolutionary communist groups in South Asia. Moreover, the Central Committee of the Maoists, in late-January 2002, passed a resolution stating that it would work together with the PWG and the MCC in fighting the ban imposed on the latter two organisations in India, under the Prevention of Terrorism Act, 2002. A year earlier, in 2001, the Maoists had sent a senior leader named Gaurav as a fraternal delegate to attend the 9th Congress of the PWG. Reports indicate that the Maoists and the PWG have also formed the Indo–Nepal Border Region Committee to coordinate their activities in North Bihar and along the India–Nepal border.

During the civil war, the Maoists also gathered a lot of support from organizations in South Asia, which was very important in carrying out the struggle with certain pace. Having visited several districts in India, Maoist chairman Prachanda studied the challenges of launching an armed struggle. Chairman Prachanda drafted war policies and tactics staying in India. Chairman Prachanda says, "First and foremost, there was the RIM Committee. There were important ideological and political exchanges. From the RIM committee we got the experience of the Communist Party of Peru, the two line struggle there, and also the experience in Turkey, the experience in Iran and the experience in the Philippines." The CPN Maoist also participated in a South Asian Conference where they held discussions with the civil war group and Maoist communist Centre groups. The party believes in achieving a lot from this meet about conducting a civil war.

Having realized the necessity of spreading the party's message to the world, the party came up with a decision to host a website which was to spread the knowledge about Nepalese revolution. Thus, www.cpnm.org was hosted with the help of some of the fraternal Maoist organization in Europe. The CPN Maoist currently after the jump into the "mainstream" politics played an initiative role in introducing a Maoist Communist Party in Bhutan as well. The new party in Bhutan is said to have greatly inspired from the Nepalese Civil War and want to have a same practice there.

=== MCC Compact ===
The Millennium Challenge Corporation (MCC) entered Nepal during the premiership of Bhattarai while a committee was formed during second premiership of Dahal to rectify MCC's compact. During premiership of Bhattarai, Barsaman Pun was the finance minister while Krishna Bahadur Mahara was the finance minister during premiership of Dahal. Maoist leaders Matrika Prasad Yadav, Bina Magar, Shakti Bahadur Basnet, Giriraj Mani Pokharel and Ram Bahadur Thapa were part of Second Oli cabinet which took the MCC's Nepal Compact to parliament. At the time, they had given approval to table the MCC compact.

Party president Prachanda publicly maintained that the Millennium Challenge Corporation's Nepal Compact could not be ratified without amending certain clauses. It was found that he was in favor of ratification as it was. The MCC later released the letter dated September 29, 2021, in which Prachanda and Prime Minister of Nepal Sher Bahadur Deuba assured MCC that the compact would be ratified within four to five months. Major national newspapers criticized Prachanda's move, saying it would deteriorate Nepal's diplomatic strength and virtue.

They reported that it was dual nature of the party to both stay in government and protest at the same time for personal profit and vote swing. This move was highly criticized by people and medias.

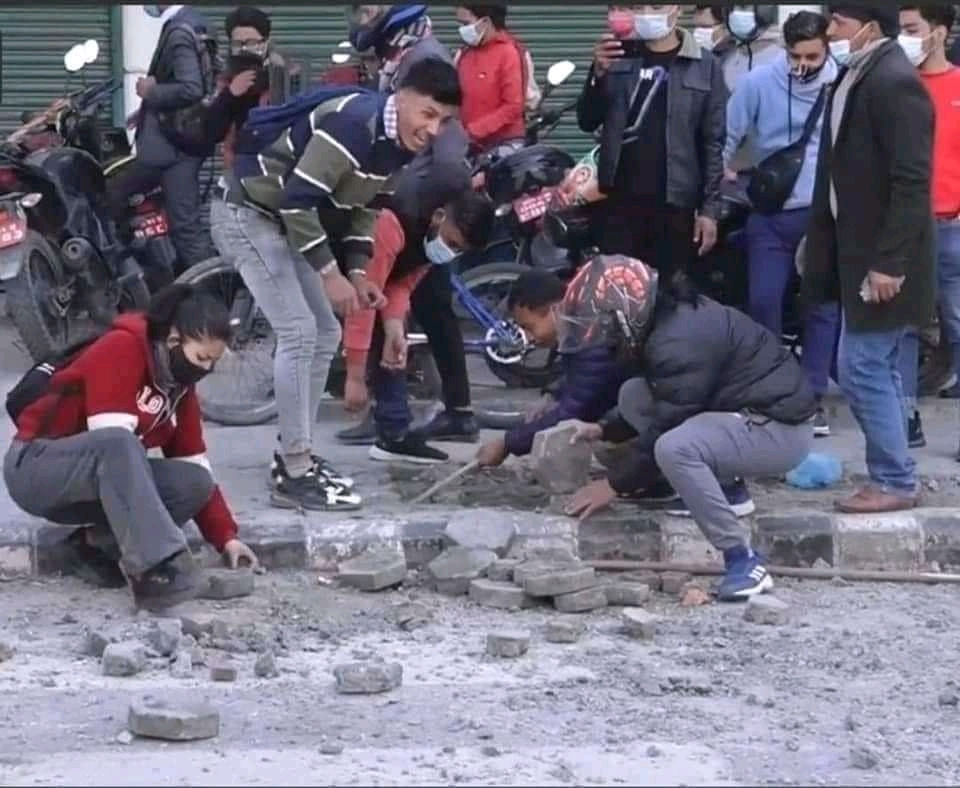
CPN (Maoist Centre) sister organisation, ANNISU (Revolutionary) leaders destroying footpath to attack police force

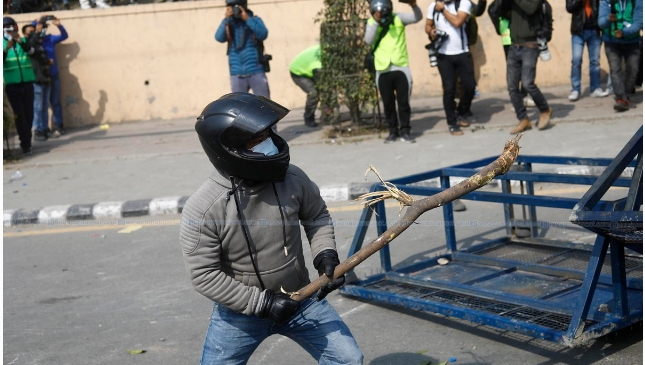
Maoist caders breaking branches of tree on footpath to attack police

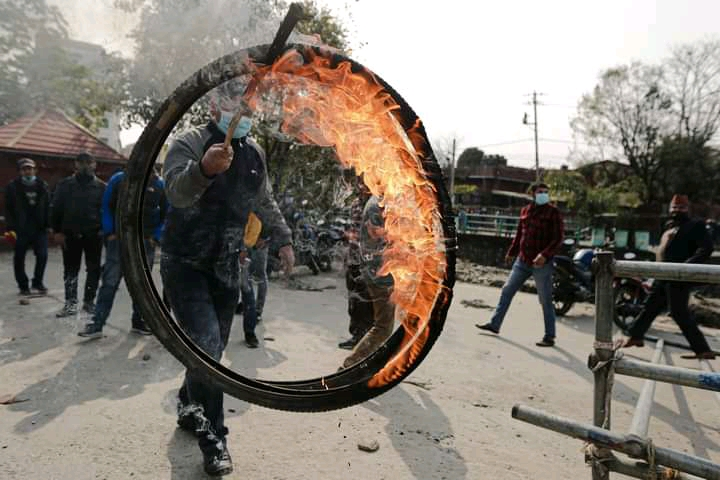
Maoist caders destroying railings of footpath by burning tyre

The party chairman had given approval to table MCC while several fellow politicians stood in opposition to the chairman's decision. They called for protests even on streets. Many police were attacked. Trees were broken, the blocks of footpath were removed to attack police as shown in picture. The branches of trees were broken. The Maoist cadets destroyed a boutique while the owner was saving police. Government had to pay for the loss. Leader of opposition and chairman of Communist Party of Nepal (Unified Marxist–Leninist), KP Sharma Oli of condemned the decision of Maoists to stay in government while destroying public property at the same time. The Home Minister of Nepal, Bal Krishna Khan's and Prime Minister asked the protesters to stay calm and not destroy public properties casing loss to the government and economy.

== Splinter groups ==
=== Janatantrik Terai Mukti Morcha ===
In 2004, a small group split from the CPN (Maoist) to form Janatantrik Terai Mukti Morcha. This group has subsequently split up into more than five groups and said to have no specific ideological destiny. The group accused the CPN (Maoist) of not guaranteeing the autonomy of the Terai region. The name is in Nepalese which means "Terai Peoples Liberation Front" in English. The Jwala Singh faction of the Janatantrik Terai Mukti Morcha (JTMM–J) was formed by Nagendra Kumar Paswan a.k.a. Jwala Singh in August 2006 after he broke away from the Jaya Krishna Goit led JTMM. Jwala Singh is a former CPN–Maoist cadre and had joined Goit when he floated the JTMM. Later, he developed differences with Goit over the strategies to be adopted for the liberation of the Terai and establishment of an independent Terai state.

=== Communist Party of Nepal (Maoist) ===
In 2009, a faction under Matrika Yadav split from UCPN (Maoist) to reorganise the previous Communist Party of Nepal (Maoist).

In June 2012 the party suffered a vertical split. The hardliner faction formed a new party named Communist Party of Nepal—Maoist, later called the Communist Party of Nepal (Revolutionary Maoist), headed by Mohan Baidya. The Communist Party of Nepal—Maoist further split to form another "Communist Party of Nepal (Maoist)" in 2014, later renamed the Communist Party of Nepal, headed by Netra Bikram Chand, (known as "Biplav Si").

== Electoral performance ==
=== Legislative elections ===
Election	Leader	Votes			Seats		Position	Resulting government
Election	Leader	No.	%	+/–	No.	+/–	Position	Resulting government
2008	Pushpa Kamal Dahal	3,144,204	29.28		220 / 575		1st	Coalition government
2013	Pushpa Kamal Dahal	1,439,726	15.21	▼14.07	80 / 575	▼140	▼3rd	In opposition
2017	Pushpa Kamal Dahal	1,303,721	13.66	▼1.55	53 / 275	▼27	3rd	Coalition government
2022 (Note: Run in coalition with NSP.)	Pushpa Kamal Dahal	1,175,684	11.13	▼2.53	32 / 275	▼21	3rd	Coalition government

=== Provincial elections ===
==== Koshi ====
Election	Votes			Seats		Position	Resulting government
Election	No.	%	+/–	No.	+/–	Position	Resulting government
2017	206,781	11.91		15 / 93		3rd	Coalition government
2022	181,245	9.54	▼2.37	13 / 93	▼2	3rd	Confidence & supply

==== Madhesh ====
Election	Votes			Seats		Position	Resulting government
Election	No.	%	+/–	No.	+/–	Position	Resulting government
2017	249,734	16.25		11 / 107		5th	In opposition
2017	249,734	16.25		11 / 107		5th	Coalition government
2022	180,860	8.67	▼7.58	8 / 107	▼3	▼6th	Coalition government

==== Bagmati ====
Election	Votes			Seats		Position	Resulting government
Election	No.	%	+/–	No.	+/–	Position	Resulting government
2017	316,876	16.75		23 / 110		2nd	Coalition government
2022	285,276	14.73	▼2.02	21 / 110	▼2	▼3rd	Coalition government

==== Gandaki ====
Election	Votes			Seats		Position	Resulting government
Election	No.	%	+/–	No.	+/–	Position	Resulting government
2017	119,528	12.49		12 / 60		3rd	Coalition government
2022	116,945	11.86	▼0.63	8 / 60	▼4	3rd	Coalition government

==== Lumbini ====
Election	Votes			Seats		Position	Resulting government
Election	No.	%	+/–	No.	+/–	Position	Resulting government
2017	239,281	14.84		20 / 87		2nd	Coalition government
2022	198,450	10.52	▼4.32	9 / 87	▼11	▼3rd	Coalition government

==== Karnali ====
Election	Votes			Seats		Position	Resulting government
Election	No.	%	+/–	No.	+/–	Position	Resulting government
2017	117,298	23.74		14 / 40		2nd	Coalition government
2022	137,629	23.82	▲0.08	13 / 40	▼1	2nd	Coalition government

==== Sudurpashchim ====
Election	Votes			Seats		Position	Resulting government
Election	No.	%	+/–	No.	+/–	Position	Resulting government
2017	142,702	18.04		14 / 53		2nd	Coalition government
2022	121,431	13.55	▼4.49	11 / 53	▼3	2nd	Coalition government

== Leadership ==
=== Chairmen ===
- Pushpa Kamal Dahal, 2001–2018, 2021–2025

=== General secretaries ===
- Pushpa Kamal Dahal, 1994–2001
- Post Bahadur Bogati, 2013–2014
- Krishna Bahadur Mahara, 2014–2016
- Ram Bahadur Thapa, 2016–2018
- Dev Prasad Gurung, 2022–Present

=== Prime Ministers of Nepal ===
No.	Prime Minister	Portrait	Term in office			Legislature	Cabinet	Constituency
No.	Prime Minister	Portrait	Start	End	Tenure	Legislature	Cabinet	Constituency
1	Pushpa Kamal Dahal		18 August 2008	25 May 2009	280 days	1st Constituent Assembly	Dahal, 2008	Kathmandu 10
1	Pushpa Kamal Dahal		4 August 2016	7 June 2017	307 days	Legislature Parliament	Dahal, 2016	Siraha 5
1	Pushpa Kamal Dahal		26 December 2022	15 July 2024	3 years, 319 days	2nd Federal Parliament of Nepal	Dahal, 2022	Gorkha 2
2	Baburam Bhattarai		29 August 2011	14 March 2013	1 year, 197 days	1st Constituent Assembly	Bhattarai, 2011	Gorkha 2

=== Chief Ministers ===
==== Bagmati Province ====
No.	Chief Minister	Portrait	Term in office			Legislature	Cabinet	Constituency
No.	Chief Minister	Portrait	Start	End	Tenure	Legislature	Cabinet	Constituency
1	Shalikram Jamkattel		10 January 2023	Incumbent	3 years, 304 days	2nd Assembly	Jamkattel, 2023	Dhading 1(B)

==== Lumbini Province ====
No.	Chief Minister	Portrait	Term in office			Legislature	Cabinet	Constituency
No.	Chief Minister	Portrait	Start	End	Tenure	Legislature	Cabinet	Constituency
1	Kul Prasad KC		11 August 2021	12 January 2023	1 year, 154 days	1st Assembly	K.C., 2021	Rolpa 1(A)
2	Jokh Bahadur Mahara		5 April 2024	Incumbent	2 years, 219 days	2nd Assembly	Mahara, 2024	Rolpa 1(A)

==== Karnali Province ====
No.	Chief Minister	Portrait	Term in office			Legislature	Cabinet	Constituency
No.	Chief Minister	Portrait	Start	End	Tenure	Legislature	Cabinet	Constituency
1	Mahendra Bahadur Shahi		16 February 2018	1 November 2021	3 years, 258 days	1st Assembly	Shahi, 2018	Kalikot 1(B)
2	Raj Kumar Sharma		12 January 2023	Incumbent	3 years, 302 days	2nd Assembly	Sharma, 2023	Western Rukum 1 (B)

==== Sudurpashchim Province ====
No.	Chief Minister	Portrait	Term in office			Legislature	Cabinet	Constituency
No.	Chief Minister	Portrait	Start	End	Tenure	Legislature	Cabinet	Constituency
1	Trilochan Bhatta		15 February 2018	12 January 2023	4 years, 331 days	1st Assembly	Bhatta, 2018	Doti 1(B)

== Sister organizations ==
- Young Communist League, Nepal
- All Nepal National Independent Students' Union (Revolutionary)
- All Nepal Women's Association (Revolutionary)
- Press Centre Nepal
- All Nepal Trade Union Federation
- Newa Rastriya Mukti Morcha, Nepal

== See also ==
- Nepali Communist Party
- Pragatisheel Loktantrik Party
- Communist Party of Nepal (Maoist) (2025)
- Nepalese Civil War
- People's Liberation Army, Nepal
