= List of people buried at sea =

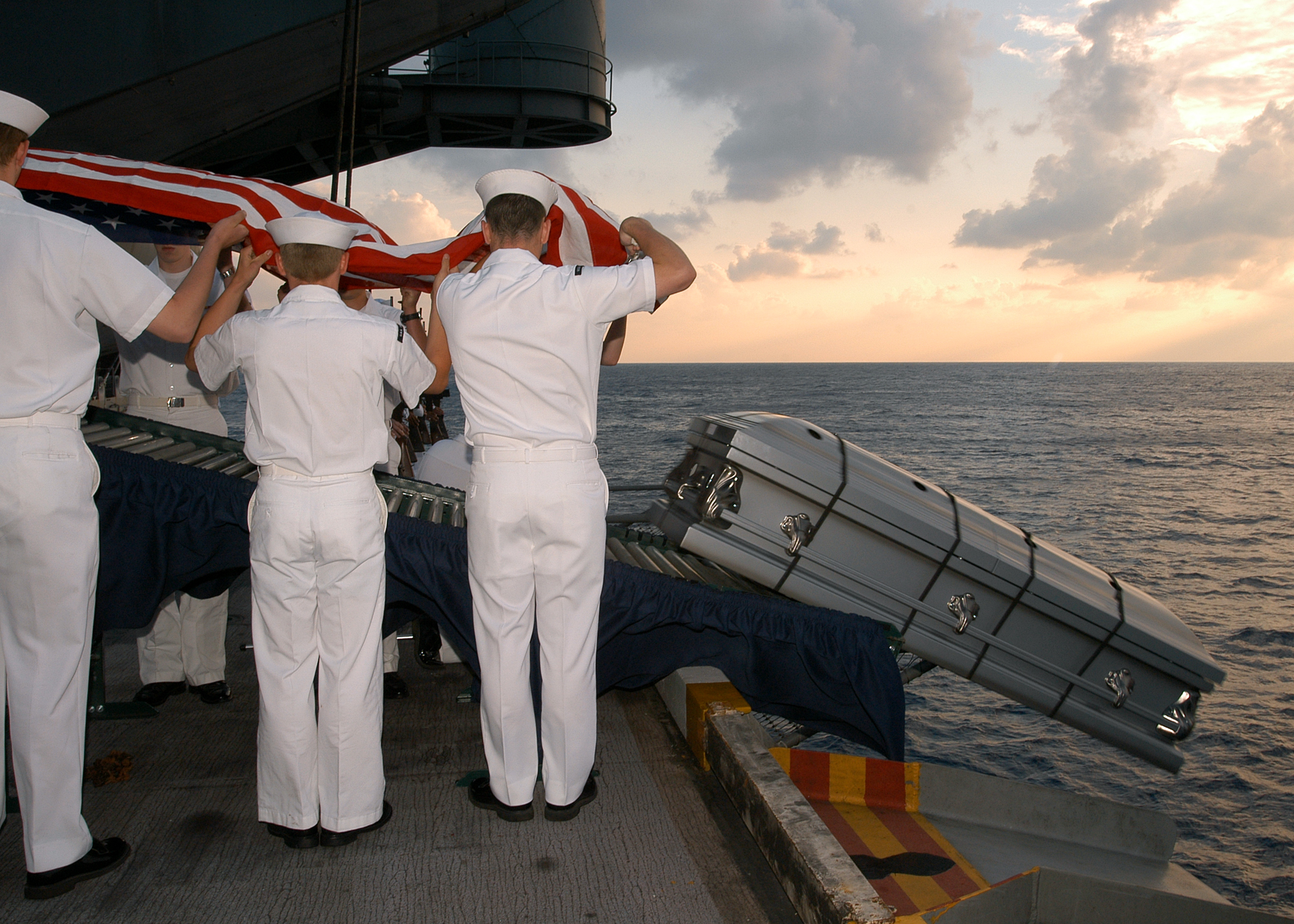
Burial at sea on the USS Enterprise, May 19, 2004

This is a list of people buried at sea.

- Edward L. Atkinson (1881–1929)
- Abu Bakr al-Baghdadi (1971–2019)
- Lewis K. Bausell (1924–1944)
- Jessie Buckland (1878–1939), New Zealand photographer, buried in the south Pacific Ocean after dying during voyage from England to New Zealand
- Horace Edgar Buckridge (1877–1903), English–born Australian soldier and explorer, buried at sea after dying during attempted voyage from New Zealand to London
- Obadiah Bush (1797–1851), prospector and businessman, buried at sea after dying during what he intended to be his final trip to the East Coast.
- John Carradine (1906–1988), prolific film actor, buried in the Southern California Bight
- Captain James Cook (1728–1779), Royal Navy officer and explorer buried at sea after being abducted and cannibalized by Hawaiians
- Gerald Charles Dickens (1879–1962)
- Sydney Smith Haldimand Dickens (1847–1872)
- Francis Drake (1540–1596), English privateer buried with two ships off the coast of Portobelo after his failed invasion of Panama
- George Duff (1764–1805), Royal Navy admiral buried at sea after being killed in the Battle of Trafalgar.
- Frank Watson Dyson (1868–1939), British Astronomer Royal buried at sea during voyage between Australia and England.
- Zachary Hickes (d. 1771), Royal Navy first lieutenant aboard HMS Endeavour on its voyage to Australia
- Kealiiahonui (1800–1849), Kaua'i nobleman buried at sea in Pearl Harbor.
- Sir Arthur Kennedy (1809–1883), British colonial governor of Hong Kong and Queensland, buried in the Red Sea after dying on voyage to England.
- Kui Lee (1932–1966), American singer-songwriter.
- Christopher Levett (1586–1630), English explorer of modern–day New England, buried at sea after dying on voyage out of Massachusetts.
- William Lowndes (1782–1822), U.S. Congressman from South Carolina, buried in the Atlantic Ocean after dying en route to the United Kingdom.
- Osama bin Laden (1957–2011), Arab terrorist.
- Atholl MacGregor (1883–1945), Chief Justice of Hong Kong, buried in the Indian Ocean after dying aboard British hospital ship after Japanese internment
- James Charles Martin (1901–1915), Australian Army private, buried in the Mediterranean Ocean after dying aboard HMHS Glenart Castle following the Gallipoli Campaign.
- Edwina Mountbatten, Countess Mountbatten of Burma (1901–1960), buried at sea from HMS Wakeful off the coast of Portsmouth.
- Naihekukui (died 1825), Hawaiian admiral, buried at sea after dying in Valparaiso, Chile
- Christian Ferdinand Schiess (1856–1884), Swiss Victoria Cross recipient and Natal Native Contingent corporal during the Anglo–Zulu War, buried at sea after dying aboard HMS Serapis.
- Wasiullah Fatehpuri (c. 1895–1967), Indian Islamic scholar and Sufi; died during a Hajj voyage and was buried at sea in the Red Sea.
- Frederic John Walker (1896–1944), Royal Navy captain known for anti–submarine operations in the Battle of the Atlantic, buried from HMS Hesperus.
- Dennis Wilson (1944–1983), American musician and cofounder of the Beach Boys, one of few American civilians to receive a full-body burial at sea.
- C. S. Wright (1887–1975)
- Alan Young (1919–2016), British actor known for playing Wilbur Post in "Mister Ed" and voicing Scrooge McDuck.
- Zheng He (1371–1433/35), Chinese admiral known for treasure voyages commissioned by the Yongle Emperor under the Ming Dynasty
- Ricardo C. Binns

== People whose ashes were scattered or buried at sea ==
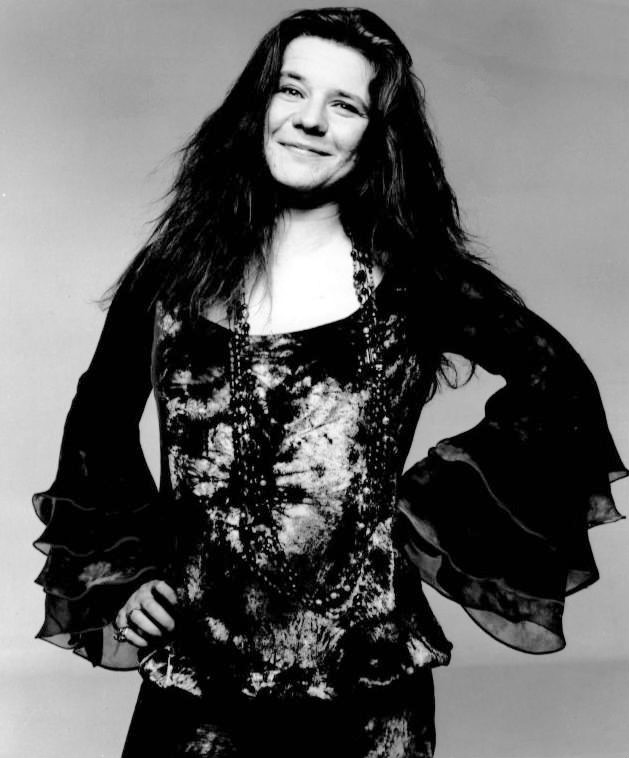
Janis Joplin's ashes were scattered in the Pacific Ocean.

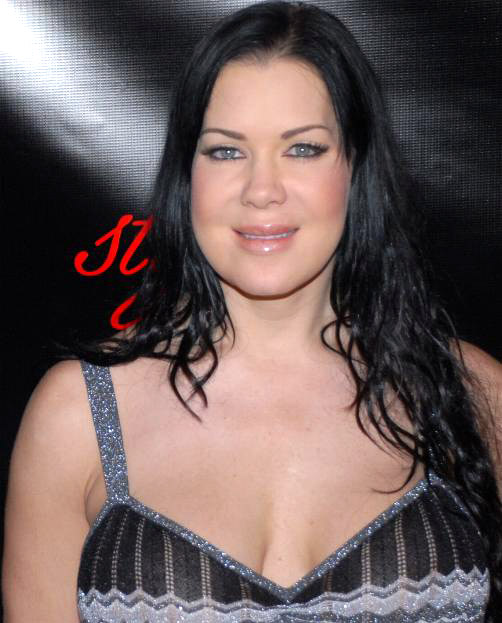
Chyna's ashes were scattered in the Pacific Ocean.

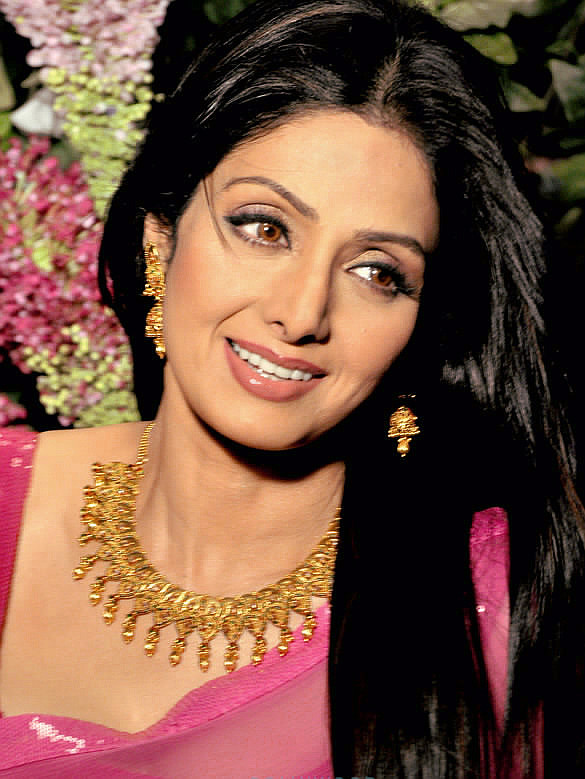
Sridevi's ashes were scattered in Rameswaram coast.

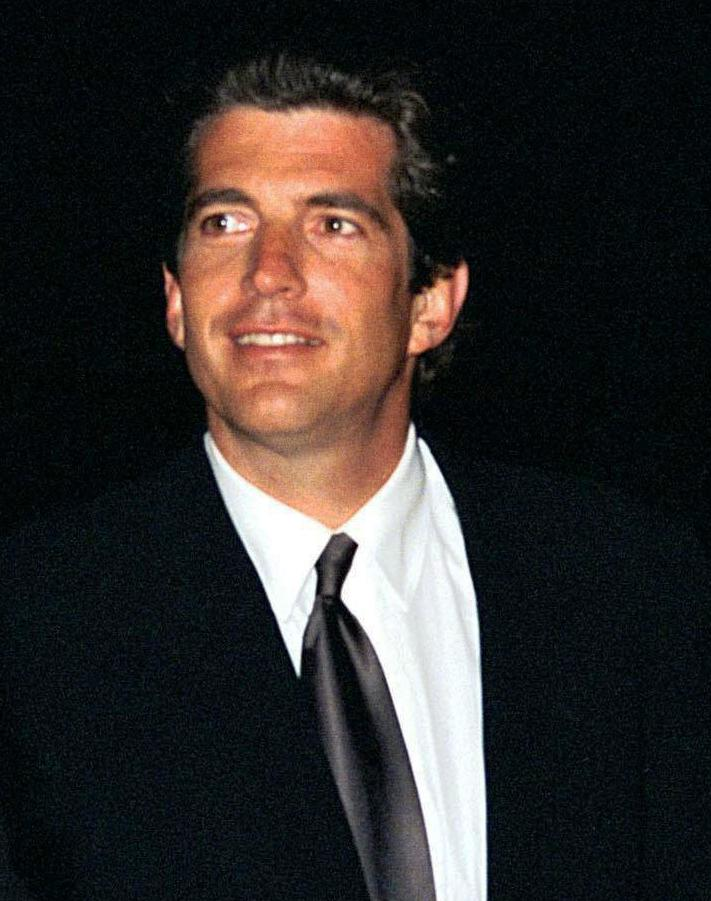
John F. Kennedy Jr.'s ashes were scattered in the Atlantic Ocean.

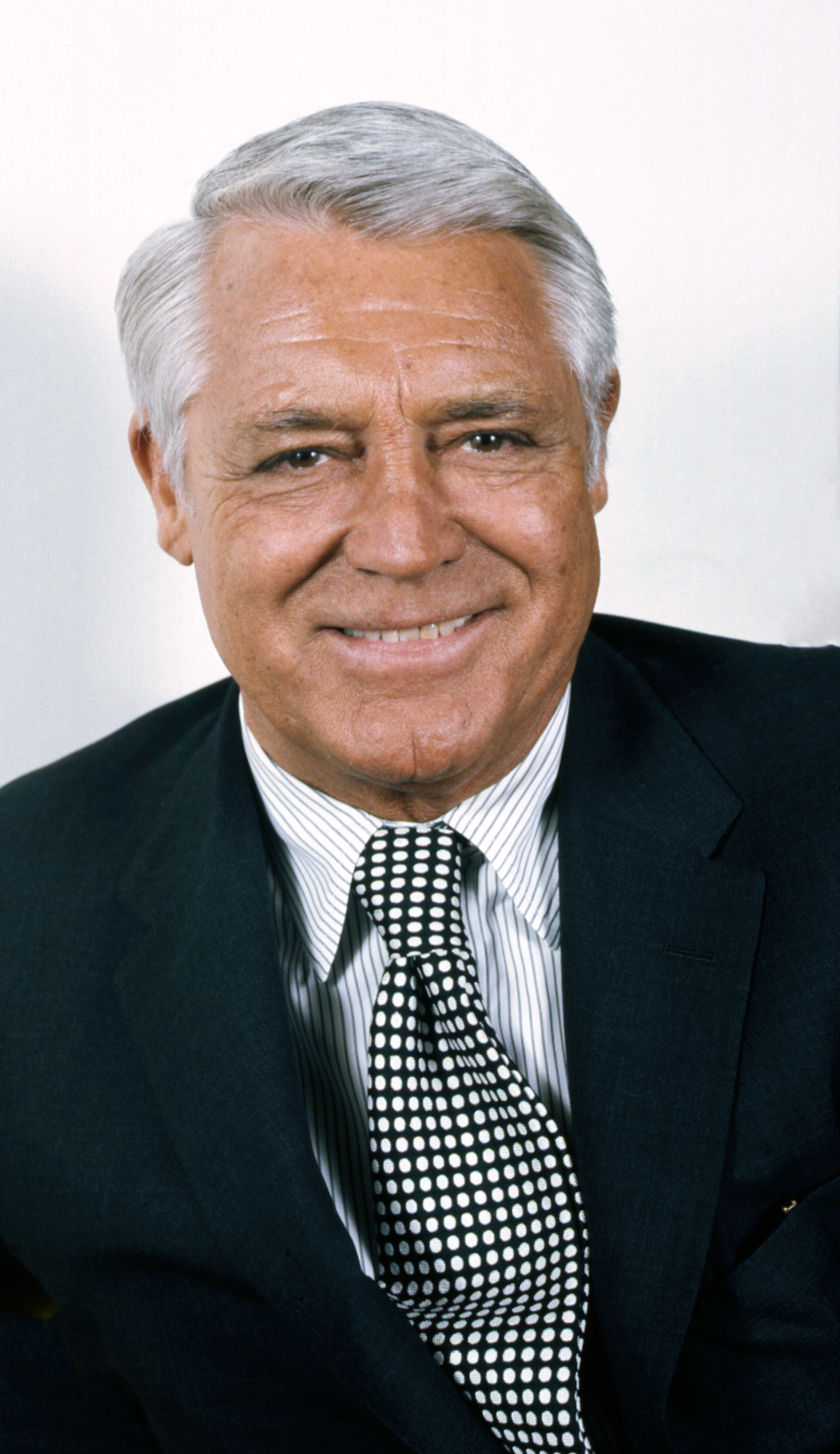
Cary Grant's ashes were scattered in the Pacific Ocean off the coast of California in 1986.

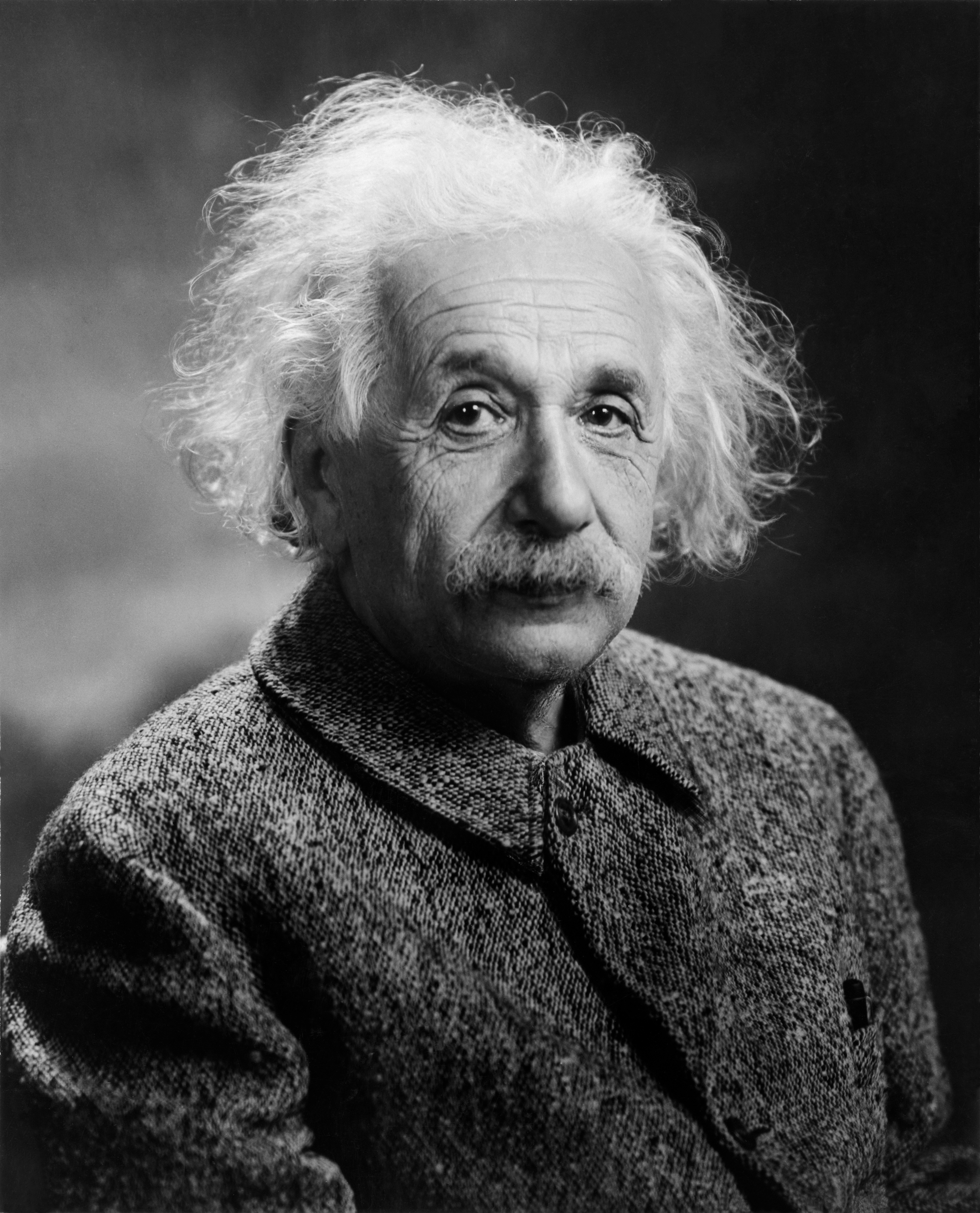
Albert Einstein's ashes were scattered in the Delaware River, reportedly near the site of George Washington's crossing.

- John Hubley
- Princess Helen Shah of Nepal
- Mari Blanchard
- Bill Daniels
- Carolyn Bessette Kennedy
- Frederick E. Bakutis
- Donald H. Bochkay
- Atal Bihari Vajpayee
- David Rollins (actor)
- Charles Dingle
- Krishan Kant
- Manmohan Singh
- Peter O'Toole
- Charles Rennie Mackintosh
- Richard Hillary
- Brendan Bracken
- Horatio Bottomley
- John Galsworthy
- Billy Strayhorn
- August Ames
- Bud Abbott (1897–1974)
- Stanley Adams (1915–1977)
- Beatriz Aguirre (1925–2019)
- Aizong (1198–1234)
- Queen Aishwarya of Nepal (1949–2001)
- Rafael Alberti (1902–1999)
- Jack Albertson (1907–1981)
- Mabel Albertson (1901–1982)
- Barbara Jo Allen (1906–1974)
- Peter Allen (1944–1992)
- Robert Altman (1925–2006)
- Kirk Alyn (1910–1999)
- Dev Anand (1923–2011)
- Edward Andrews (1914–1985)
- Bobby Anderson (1933–2008)
- Maxwell Anderson (1888–1959)
- John Anderson (1922–1992)
- Roscoe Arbuckle (1887–1933)
- Neil Armstrong (1930–2012)
- Desi Arnaz (1917–1986)
- Sig Arno (1895–1975)
- Bea Arthur (1922-2009)
- Jean Arthur (1900–1991)
- Maureen Arthur (1934–2022)
- Hal Ashby (1929–1988)
- Malcolm Atterbury (1907–1992)
- Edith Atwater (1911–1986)
- James Avery (1945–2013)
- Raymond Bailey (1904–1980)
- Cleo Baldon (1927–2014)
- Lester Bangs (1948–1982)
- Lynn Bari (1919–1989)
- Saul Bass (1920–1996)
- Erik Bauersfeld (1922-2016)
- Cheri Jo Bates (1948–1966)
- Orson Bean (1928–2020)
- Hugh Beaumont (1909–1982)
- Bruce Bennett (1906–2007)
- Maurice Béjart (1927–2007)
- Ken Berry (1933–2018)
- Marcheline Bertrand (1950–2007)
- Annie Besant (1847–1933)
- Carolyn Bessette–Kennedy (1966–1999)
- Krishna Prasad Bhattarai (1924–2011)
- Herbert Biberman (1900–1971)
- Clarence Birdseye (1886–1956)
- Birendra of Nepal (1945–2001)
- Joey Bishop (1918–2007)
- Kirti Nidhi Bista (1927–2017)
- Bill Bixby (1934–1993) (ashes scattered off Hana, Hawaii)
- Mari Blanchard (1923–1970)
- Wally Boag (1920-2011)
- Betty Bobbitt (1939–2020)
- William E. Boeing (1881–1956)
- Dirk Bogarde (1921–1999)
- Jorge Bolet (1914–1990)
- Ward Bond (1903–1960)
- Richard Boone (1917–1981)
- Veda Ann Borg (1915–1973)
- Martin Bormann (1900–1945)
- Dorris Bowdon (1914–2005)
- David Bowie (1947–2016)
- Lee Bowman (1914–1979)
- Joseph Boxhall (1884–1967) (ashes scattered off Atlantic Ocean)
- Paul Bragg (1895–1976)
- Sybil Brand (1899–2004)
- Jocelyn Brando (1919–2005)
- Marlon Brando (1924–2004)
- Robert Bray (1917–1983)
- George Brent (1904–1979)
- Jean Brooks (1915–1963)
- Martin E. Brooks (1925–2015)
- James Brown (1920–1992)
- Phil Brown (1916–2006)
- Dik Browne (1917–1989)
- Stanley Bruce (1883–1967)
- Yama Buddha (1987–2017)
- Jimmy Buffett (1946–2023)
- Cliff Burton (1962–1986)
- Edd Byrnes (1932–2020)
- Nero Caesar (37–68) (His ashes were originally entombed on the Pincian Hill by those close to him. Over a millennium later, as part of an exorcism conducted on the orders of Pope Paschal II, his tomb was destroyed, the Basilica of Santa Maria del Popolo was erected in its place, and his ashes were scattered in the Tiber River.)
- Don Calfa (1939–2016)
- Maria Callas (1923–1977) (Her ashes were originally buried in the Père Lachaise Cemetery. After being stolen and later recovered, they were scattered into the Aegean Sea, off the coast of Greece on June 3, 1979)
- John Callahan (1953–2020)
- Pablito Calvo (1948–2000)
- Donald Cameron (1916–1961)
- Norman Campbell (1924–2004) (ashes sprinkled off Prince Edward Island)
- Olive Carey (1896–1988)
- George Carlin (1937–2008) (some of his ashes were scattered over Spofford Lake)
- Allen Carr (1934–2006)
- Robert Carradine (1954–2026) (ashes scattered off the coast of Los Angeles County)
- Anthony Caruso (1916–2003)
- Adriana Caselotti (1916–1997)
- Eva Cassidy (1963–1996)
- Jack Cassidy (1927–1976)
- Joan Caulfield (1922–1991)
- Christine Cavanaugh (1963–2014)
- Marge Champion (1919–2020)
- Dorothy Buffum Chandler (1901–1997)
- Norman Chandler (1899–1973)
- Ben Chapman (1928–2008) (ashes scattered off Hawaii and at Park Lake (Black Lagoon) at Universal Studios)
- Beth Chapman (1967–2019)
- Lonny Chapman (1920–2007)
- Paul Cushing Child (1902–1994)
- David Christie (1948–1997)
- Christine Chubbuck (1944–1974)
- Chyna (1969–2016) (cremated and ashes scattered at the Pacific Ocean)
- Diane Cilento (1932–2011)
- John Cipollina (1943–1989)
- Dick Clark (1929–2012)
- Fred Clark (1914–1968)
- Colin Clive (1900–1937)
- Alberto Closas (1921–1994)
- June Clyde (1909–1987)
- Kurt Cobain (1967–1994)
- Tris Coffin (1909–1990)
- Barbara Colby (1939–1975)
- Cyril Collard (1957–1993)
- William Collier Jr. (1902–1987)
- Christopher Collins (1949–1994)
- Jack Colvin (1934–2005)
- Chester Conklin (1886–1971)
- Sean Connery (1930–2020) (some of his ashes were scattered at sea near Bahamas)
- Brian Connolly (1945–1997)
- Pat Conway (1931–1981)
- Robert Coogan (1924–1978)
- Merian C. Cooper (1893–1973)
- Kevin Corcoran (1949–2015)
- Ted de Corsia (1903–1973)
- Carolina Cotton (1925–1997)
- Hazel Court (1926–2008)
- Wally Cox (1924–1973)
- Francis Crick (1916–2004)
- Mary Jane Croft (1916–1999)
- Joel Crothers (1941–1985)
- Georg Danzer (1946–2007) (cremated and his ashes scattered near Mallorca)
- Frankie Darro (1917–1976)
- Arthur Davis (1905–2000)
- Don S. Davis (1942–2008)
- Richard Deacon (1922–1984)
- Millvina Dean (1912–2009) (ashes scattered off the docks of Southampton)
- Frances Dee (1909–2004)
- Philippe De Lacy (1917–1995)
- Deng Xiaoping (1904–1997)
- Deng Yingchao (1904–1992)
- Martin Denny (1911–2005)
- Lizzy Mercier Descloux (1956–2004)
- Tara Devi (1945–2006)
- Upendra Devkota (1953–2018)
- Dhirendra of Nepal (1950–2001)
- Dena Dietrich (1928–2020)
- Roy E. Disney (1930–2009)
- Phyllis Diller (1917–2012)
- Dipendra of Nepal (1971–2001)
- Lawrence Dobkin (1919–2002)
- Peter Dodge (1950–2023) (ashes dropped into the eye of Hurricane Milton)
- Ahn Doo–hee (1917–1996)
- Brian Donlevy (1901–1972)
- Jeff Donnell (1921–1988)
- Jack Donohue (1908–1984)
- Ann Doran (1911–2000)
- Donald Wills Douglas Sr. (1892–1981)
- Robert Douglas (1909–1999)
- Robert Dowdell (1932–2018)
- Denise Dowse (1958–2022)
- Charles Drake (1917–1994)
- Joanne Dru (1922–1996)
- Ja'Net DuBois (1932, 1938, or 1945–2020)
- Eddy Duchin (1909–1951)
- Doris Duke (1912–1993)
- James Dunn (1901–1967)
- Ann (1942–1995) and Madelyn Dunham (1922–2008) (ashes were scattered on the south side of Oahu into the Pacific Ocean.)
- Ann Dvorak (1911–1979)
- Harry Earles (1902–1985)
- Paddi Edwards (1931-1999)
- William Edmunds (1886–1981)
- Adolf Eichmann (1906–1962) (Following the 1962 execution in Israel of Eichmann, the Nazi responsible for overseeing the extermination of millions of Jews during the Holocaust, his body was cremated and his ashes scattered over the Mediterranean Sea in international waters because Israel did not want Eichmann buried on its soil or to have a grave anywhere else that might have become a place of pilgrimage for other Nazis.)
- Albert Einstein (1879–1955) (ashes scattered in the Delaware River near the site of George Washington's crossing)
- James Ellison (1910–1993)
- Isobel Elsom (1893–1981)
- Friedrich Engels (1820–1895) (ashes scattered into the English Channel off Beachy Head)
- Edith Evanson (1896–1980)
- Tommy Facenda (1939–2022)
- Harold Farncomb (1899–1971)
- David Farrar (1908–1995) (ashes scattered into the Indian Ocean)
- Charles Fernley Fawcett (1915–2008)
- José Fernández (1992–2016)
- Virginia Field (1917–1992)
- John Fiedler (1925–2005)
- Bill Finger (1914–1974)
- Gail Fisher (1935–2000)
- Janet Flanner (1892–1978)
- Art Fleming (1924–1995)
- Joel Fluellen (1907–1990)
- Dan Fogelberg (1951–2007)
- Tom Fogerty (1941–1990)
- Benson Fong (1916–1987)
- Henry Ford II (1917–1987)
- Robert Forster (1941–2019)
- Bob Fosse (1927–1987)
- Anne Francis (1930–2011)
- Hans Frank (1900–1946)
- Elisabeth Fraser (1920–2005)
- Thornton Freeland (1898–1987)
- Paul Frees (1920–1986) (ashes sprinkled into the Pacific Ocean)
- Victor French (1934–1989)
- Wilhelm Frick (1877–1946)
- Milton Friedman (1912–2006)
- Tom Fuccello (1936–1993)
- Jean Gabin (1904–1976)
- Anthony Galindo (1979–2020)
- Mahatma Gandhi (1869–1948) (some of his ashes were scattered in the Ganges, Nile, and Yamuna Rivers as well as the Arabian Sea and off the coast of South Africa)
- Jerry Garcia (1942–1995) (ashes divided between the Ganges and San Francisco Bay)
- Erle Stanley Gardner (1889–1970)
- Romain Gary (1914-1980)
- Doris Gates (1901–1987)
- Marvin Gaye (1939–1984)
- Charles Gaylord (1936–2009)
- Leyla Gencer (1928–2008) (cremated and ashes scattered off from Bosphorus)
- Lowell George (1945–1979)
- Hjördis Genberg (1919–1997)
- Charles Gérard (1922–2019)
- Betty Lou Gerson (1914–1999)
- Stan Getz (1927–1991)
- Jagadish Ghimire (1946–2013)
- Madhav Prasad Ghimire (1919–2020)
- Frances Gifford (1920–1994)
- Helen Gilbert (1915–1995)
- Frank Bunker Gilbreth (1868–1924) (ashes scattered in the Atlantic Ocean)
- Lillian Moller Gilbreth (1878–1972)
- Virginia Gilmore (1919–1986)
- Tulsi Giri (1926–2018)
- Ned Glass (1906–1984)
- Mary Pat Gleason (1950–2020)
- Joseph Goebbels (1897–1945)
- Shyamala Gopalan (1938–2009)
- Hermann Göring (1893–1946)
- Michael Gough (1916–2011) (ashes scattered into the English Channel)
- Cary Grant (1904–1986)
- Richard Greene (1918–1985)
- Charlotte Greenwood (1890–1977)
- Virginia Grey (1917–2004)
- Corinne Griffith (1894–1979)
- Woody Guthrie (1912–1967)
- Amber Gurung (1938–2016)
- Khem Raj Gurung (1975–2016)
- Don Haggerty (1914–1988)
- Alan Hale Jr. (1921–1990)
- Richard Hale (1892–1981)
- Alaina Reed Hall (1946–2009)
- Roy Halston (1932–1990)
- Rusty Hamer (1947–1990)
- Neil Hamilton (1899–1984)
- Sam Hanks (1914–1994)
- Yip Harburg (1896–1981)
- Hugh Harman (1903–1982)
- George Harrison (1943–2001) (ashes scattered in the Ganges River)
- John Hart (1917–2009)
- Paul Hartman (1904–1973)
- Phil Hartman (1948–1998) (ashes scattered off from Santa Catalina Island's Emerald Bay)
- Walter de Havilland (1872–1968)
- Peter Hawkins (1924–2006) (ashes scattered in Fermain Bay)
- Screamin' Jay Hawkins (1929–2000)
- Taylor Hawkins (1972–2022)
- Kenneth Hawks (1898–1930)
- Alexandra Hay (1947–1993)
- Sterling Hayden (1916–1986)
- Richard Haydn (1905–1985)
- Billie Hayes (1924–2021)
- Buddy Hayes (1916–1997)
- Jean Heather (1921–1995)
- Robert A. Heinlein (1907–1988) (cremated and ashes scattered in the Pacific Ocean)
- Pêr-Jakez Helias (1914–1995)
- Henrik, Prince Consort of Denmark (1934–2018)
- Gloria Henry (1923–2021)
- Rudolf Hess (1894–1987) (He was originally buried in Wunsiedel cemetery in Bavaria. After his tomb became a potential pilgrimage place for neo–Nazis, his body was disinterred in July 2011, cremated, and the ashes scattered at sea.)
- David Hedison (1927–2019)
- Van Heflin (1908–1971)
- Jascha Heifetz (1901–1987)
- Doug Henning (1947–2000)
- William Henry (1914–1982)
- Jon-Erik Hexum (1957–1984)
- Anne T. Hill (1916–1999)
- Arthur Hill (1922–2006)
- Bernard Hill (1944–2024) (Ashes sprinkled into the English Channel)
- Edmund Hillary (1919–2008) (ashes scattered in New Zealand's Hauraki Gulf)
- Stephen Hillenburg (1961–2018)
- Pat Hingle (1924–2009)
- Alfred Hitchcock (1899–1980)
- Adolf Hitler (1889–1945) (After the initial funeral pyre, his remains were seized by the Soviets and studied for years before being destroyed completely, after which the ashes were scattered in the Elbe River.)
- Don Ho (1930–2007)
- William Holden (1918–1981)
- John Holmes (1944–1988)
- Sterling Holloway (1905–1992)
- John Houseman (1902–1988)
- Kenny Howard (1929–1992)
- Huell Howser (1945–2013)
- Ian Hugo (1898–1985)
- L. Ron Hubbard (1911–1986)
- Rochelle Hudson (1916–1972)
- Rock Hudson (1925–1985)
- Michael Hutchence (1960–1997) (Ashes scattered in Sydney Harbour)
- Diana Hyland (1936–1977)
- Thomas H. Ince (1880–1924)
- Richard Jaeckel (1926–1997)
- Brion James (1945–1999)
- Joyce Jameson (1932–1987)
- Princess Jayanti of Nepal (1946–2001)
- Allen Jenkins (1900–1974)
- Peter Jennings (1938–2005)
- Isabel Jewell (1907–1972)
- Jiang Zemin (1926–2022)
- Joan of Arc (1412–1431)
- Alfred Jodl (1890–1946)
- Scatman John (1942–1999)
- Marsha P. Johnson (1945–1992) (ashes scattered over the Hudson River)
- Anissa Jones (1958–1976)
- Buck Jones (1891–1942)
- Buster Jones (1943–2014)
- Charlie Jones (1930–2008)
- Chuck Jones (1912–2002)
- Janis Joplin (1943–1970)
- Christine Jorgensen (1926–1989)
- Duke Kahanamoku (1890–1968)
- Lani Kai (1936–1999)
- Ernst Kaltenbrunner (1903–1946)
- Eddie Kamae (1927–2017)
- Israel Kamakawiwo'ole (1959–1997) (ashes sprinkled into the Pacific Ocean at Mākua Beach)
- Rishi Kapoor (1952–2020)
- Martha Karagianni (1939–2022)
- Kurt Kasznar (1913–1979)
- Kathryn Kates (1948–2022)
- Hari Bhakta Katuwal (1935–1980)
- Gilbert Lani Kauhi (1937–2004)
- Moe Keale (1939–2002)
- Eleanor Keaton (1918–1998)
- Kekāuluohi (1794–1845)
- Wilhelm Keitel (1882–1946)
- Sally Kellerman (1937–2022)
- DeForest Kelley (1920–1999)
- Graham Kennedy (1934–2005) (ashes sprinkled at Kiama)
- John F. Kennedy Jr. (1960–1999) (cremated at Mayflower Cemetery crematorium, Duxbury, Massachusetts, ashes sprinkled from USS Briscoe in the Atlantic Ocean off the coast of Martha's Vineyard)
- Barbara Kent (1907–2011)
- Sandy Kenyon (1922–2010)
- Klaus Kinski (1926–1991)
- Polly Klaas (1981–1993) (ashes sprinked across the Pacific Ocean)
- Werner Klemperer (1920–2000)
- Girija Prasad Koirala (1924–2010)
- Sushil Koirala (1939–2016)
- Charles Korvin (1907–1998)
- Irwin Kostal (1911-1994)
- Henry Koster (1905–1988)
- Hans Krebs (1898–1945)
- Otto Kretschmer (1912–1998)
- Jiddu Krishnamurti (1895–1986)
- Machiko Kyō (1924–2019)
- Jacques Lacarrière (1925–2005)
- Devi Lal (1914–2001)
- Laura La Plante (1904–1996)
- Frankie Laine (1913–2007)
- Veronica Lake (1922–1973)
- Libertad Lamarque (1908–2000)
- Fernando Lamas (1915–1982)
- Elsa Lanchester (1902–1986)
- Vicky Lane (1926–1983)
- Victor Lanoux (1936–2017)
- George Lansbury (1859–1940)
- Ring Lardner Jr. (1915–2000)
- John Laurie (1897–1980) (ashes were scattered into the English Channel)
- Harry Lauter (1914–1990)
- John Phillip Law (1937–2008)
- Peter Lawford (1923–1984), actor, was cremated and ashes originally buried at Westwood Village Memorial Park Cemetery; they were later removed and sprinkled in the Pacific Ocean.
- Cloris Leachman (1926–2021)
- Bill Lear (1902–1978)
- Eppie Lederer (1918–2002)
- Vivien Leigh (1913–1967)
- Elliott Lewis (1917–1990)
- Rachael Lillis (1969–2024) (ashes scattered in Los Angeles)
- Charles Lindbergh Jr. (1930–1932)
- Larry Linville (1939–2000)
- Cleavon Little (1939–1992)
- Liu Shaoqi (1898–1969)
- Liu Xiaobo (1955–2017), 2010 Nobel Peace Prize Winner.
- Frank Loesser (1910–1969)
- Richard Long (1927–1974)
- Jack Lord (1920–1998)
- Delos W. Lovelace (1894–1967)
- Arthur Lubin (1898–1995)
- Sue Lyon (1946–2019)
- Frederica Sagor Maas (1900–2012)
- John D. MacArthur (1897–1978)
- Moyna Macgill (1895–1975)
- Shane MacGowan (1957–2023) (ashes scattered in the River Shannon)
- Jack MacGowran (1918–1973)
- Angus MacLise (1938–1979)
- Norma MacMillan (1921–2001) (ashes sprinkled off from Strait of Juan de Fuca)
- Meredith MacRae (1944–2000)
- Mahendra of Nepal (1920–1972)
- Maharishi Mahesh Yogi (191?–2008)
- Jock Mahoney (1919–1989)
- Arthur Malet (1927-2013)
- Lata Mangeshkar (1929–2022)
- Guillermo Marín (1905–1988)
- Michael Mark (1886–1975)
- Brenda Marshall (1915–1992)
- Adolfo Marsillach (1928–2002)
- Dick Martin (1922–2008)
- Lori Martin (1947–2010)
- Elsa Martinelli (1935–2017)
- Zeppo Marx (1901–1979) (ashes scattered in the Pacific Ocean)
- Murray Matheson (1912–1985)
- Al Matthews (1942–2018)
- Lester Matthews (1900–1975)
- Jenny Maxwell (1941–1981)
- Jacques Mayol (1927–2001)
- Patti McCarty (1921–1985)
- Lon McCallister (1923–2005)
- Mercedes McCambridge (1916–2004)
- Loren G. McCollom (1914–1982)
- Joel McCrea (1905–1990)
- Roddy McDowall (1928–1998)
- Dorothy McGuire (1916–2001)
- Charles McGraw (1914–1980)
- Dallas McKennon (1919–2009)
- Scott McKenzie (1939–2012)
- Charles McKimson (1914–1999)
- Bill McKinney (1931–2011)
- Kenneth McLennan (1925–2005)
- Addie McPhail (1905–2003)
- Steve McQueen (1930–1980)
- Kimo Wilder McVay (1927–2001)
- Patrick McVey (1910–1973) (ashes sprinkled into the Atlantic Ocean)
- George Meeker (1904–1984)
- Ib Melchior (1917–2015)
- Ismael Merlo (1918–1984)
- Don Messick (1926–1997), (ashes were sprinkled in the Pacific Ocean, at the Point Lobos State Reserve)
- Dorothy Meyer (1924–1987)
- Harvey Milk (1930–1978)
- Ray Milland (1907–1986)
- Nolan Miller (1933–2012)
- Mort Mills (1919–1993)
- Jessica Mitford (1917–1996)
- Pindale Min (1608–1661)
- Mary Miles Minter (1902–1984)
- Robert Mitchum (1917–1997)
- Peggy Moran (1918–2002)
- Marc Moreland (1958–2002)
- Toshia Mori (1912–1995)
- Patricia Morison (1915–2018)
- Karen Morley (1909–2003)
- Priscilla Morrill (1927–1994)
- Chester Morris (1901–1970)
- George Stephen Morrison (1919–2008)
- Jeff Morrow (1907–1993)
- Kirby Morrow (1973–2020)
- Oswald Mosley (1896–1980)
- Roger E. Mosley (1938–2022)
- Douglas Mossman (1933–2021)
- Pranab Mukherjee (1935–2020)
- George Murdock (1930–2012)
- Dennis Murphy (1932–2005)
- Natalia Danesi Murray (1901–1994)
- Lorenzo Music (1937–2001)
- Jim Nabors (1930–2017)
- Laurence Naismith (1908–1992) (ashes sprinkled into the Pacific Ocean)
- George Nader (1921–2002)
- Jack Nance (1943–1996)
- Noreen Nash (1924–2023)
- Robert Nathan (1894–1985) and his wife Anna Lee (1913–2004)
- Mikhail Nazvanov (1918–1964)
- Tom Neal (1914–1972)
- Jawaharlal Nehru (1889–1964)
- Gene Nelson (1920–1996)
- Anaïs Nin (1903–1977)
- Prince Nirajan of Nepal (1978–2001)
- Akira Nishiguchi (1925–1970) (ashes scattered in Beppu Bay)
- Chuck Norris (1940–2026)
- Bradley Nowell (1968–1996)
- George O'Brien (1899–1985)
- Donald O'Connor (1925–2003)
- Anita O'Day (1919–2006)
- Scott O'Dell (1898–1989)
- Odetta (1930–2008)
- Zelma O'Neal (1903–1989)
- J. Robert Oppenheimer (1904–1967)
- Admiral Sir Herbert Annesley Packer (1894–1962) (ashes scattered at sea off Cape Point, South Africa)
- Earle Page (1880–1961)
- Ali-Reza Pahlavi (1966–2011)
- Aloysius Pang (1990–2019)
- Al Parker (1952–1992)
- Eleanor Parker (1922–2013)
- Dennis Patrick (1918–2002)
- Gail Patrick (1911–1980)
- Shirley Patterson (1922–1995) (ashes sprinkled into the Atlantic Ocean)
- John Payne (1912–1989)
- Alice Pearce (1917–1966)
- Harold Peary (1908–1985)
- Sam Peckinpah (1925–1984)
- Christopher Pettiet (1976–2000)
- Dana Plato (1964–1999)
- Edward Platt (1916–1974)
- Basil Poledouris (1945–2006)
- Khieu Ponnary (1920–2003)
- Olaf Pooley (1914–2015)
- Dudley Pound (1877–1943)
- Robert Preston (1918–1987)
- Vincent Price (1911–1993)
- John Prine (1946–2020) (ashes scattered in the Green River)
- Gerry Rafferty (1947–2011) (ashes scattered off the coast of Iona)
- Grigori Rasputin (1869–1916)
- Marguerite Ray (1931–2020)
- Ivan Rebroff (1931–2008)
- Helen Reddy (1941–2020)
- Orville Redenbacher (1907–1995)
- Roger Rees (1944–2015)
- Elliott Reid (1920–2013)
- Tommy Rettig (1941–1996)
- Walter Reuter (1906–2005)
- Alma Reville (1899–1982)
- Mike Reynolds (1929–2022)
- Joachim von Ribbentrop (1893–1946)
- Florence Rice (1907–1974)
- George Maxwell Richards (1931–2018)
- Sogyal Rinpoche (1947–2019)
- Jerome Robbins (1918–1998)
- Rod La Rocque (1896–1969) and his wife Vilma Bánky (1901–1991)
- Richard Rodgers (1902–1979)
- Gilbert Roland (1905–1994)
- Ruth Roman (1922–1999)
- Alfred Rosenberg (1893–1946)
- Donald K. Ross (1910–1992)
- Russell Rouse (1913–1987)
- Jane Russell (1921–2011)
- Nipsey Russell (1918–2005)
- Herbert Ryman (1910–1989)
- Victoria Josefa Sackville–West (1862–1936)
- Don Sahlin (1928–1978)
- Gar Samuelson (1958–1999)
- George Sanders (1906–1972) (ashes sprinkled into the English Channel)
- Alice Sapritch (1916–1990)
- Fritz Sauckel (1894–1946)
- Girolamo Savonarola (1452–1498)
- Jessica Savitch (1947–1983)
- Natalie Schafer (1900–1991)
- William Schallert (1922–2016)
- Maria Schneider (1952–2011)
- David Schramm (1946–2020)
- Bill Scott (1920–1985)
- Douglas Seale (1913–1999)
- Consuelo Sedano (1936–2025)
- Kate Seredy (1899–1975)
- Dr. Seuss (1904–1991)
- Arthur Seyss-Inquart (1892–1946)
- Princess Sharada Shah of Nepal (1942–2001)
- Ravi Shankar (1920–2012)
- Shubhendra Shankar (1942–1992)
- Bob Shane (1934–2020)
- Chandra Shekhar (1927–2007)
- Alan Shepard (1923–1998)
- Jean Shepherd (1921–1999) (ashes sprinkled into the Gulf of Mexico)
- Susan Sheridan (1947-2015)
- Shree Krishna Shrestha (1967–2014)
- Princess Shruti of Nepal (1976–2001)
- Princess Shanti Singh of Nepal (1940–2001)
- Felix Silla (1937–2021)
- Vishwanath Pratap Singh (1931–2008)
- Norton Simon (1907–1993)
- Udham Singh (1899–1940)
- Joseph Siravo (1955 or 1957–2021)
- Edna Skinner (1921–2003)
- Alexis Smith (1921–1993)
- John Smith (1931–1995)
- Scott Smith (1948–1995)
- Gale Sondergaard (1899–1985)
- Phil Spector (1939–2021)
- Sridevi (1963–2018) (cremated and ashes immersed in the sea off Rameshwaram coast in Chennai)
- Chris Stamp (1942–2012)
- Stefán Karl Stefánsson (1975–2018)
- Craig Stevens (1918–2000)
- Inger Stevens (1934–1970)
- Morgan Stevens (1951–2022)
- Martha Stewart (1922–2021)
- David Ogden Stiers (1942–2018)
- Uri Avnery (1923–2018)
- Joseph Stilwell (1883–1946)
- Graeme "Shirley" Strachan (1952–2001)
- Susan Strasberg (1938–1999)
- Julius Streicher (1885–1946)
- Reinhard Suhren (1916–1984)
- Sak Sutsakhan (1928–1994)
- Dolph Sweet (1920–1985)
- Grady Sutton (1906–1995)
- Rabindranath Tagore (1861–1941)
- Lyle Talbot (1902–1996)
- Margaret Tallichet (1914–1991)
- Akim Tamiroff (1899–1972)
- Tan Chor Jin (1966–2009)
- Professor Tanaka (1930–2000)
- Norman Taurog (1899–1981)
- Rip Taylor (1931–2019)
- Bhakti Thapa (1741–1815)
- Surya Bahadur Thapa (1928–2015)
- Ted Thomas (1929–2022) (ashes scattered off the Hong Kong Harbor)
- Bill Thompson (1913–1971)
- Richard Thorpe (1896–1991)
- Paul Tibbets (1915–2007) (ashes sprinkled into the English Channel)
- Pat Tillman (1976–2004)
- Peter Tobin (1946–2022)
- Hideki Tojo (1884–1948)
- Regis Toomey (1898–1991)
- Erich Topp (1914–2005)
- Peter Tork (1942–2019)
- Alex Toth (1928–2006)
- Arthur Treacher (1894–1975)
- Claire Trevor (1910–2000)
- Tribhuvan of Nepal (1906–1955)
- Ernest Truex (1889–1973)
- Lana Turner (1921–1995)
- Paul Twitchell (1908 or 1909–1971)
- Bishwonath Upadhyaya (1930–2014)
- Vivian Vance (1909–1979)
- Kelly Jean Van Dyke (1958–1991)
- Vanity (1959–2016)
- Monica Vitti (1931–2022)
- Wende Wagner (1941–1997)
- Roy Walford (1924–2004)
- Nancy Walker (1922–1992)
- Marcia Wallace (1942–2013)
- Charles Walters (1911–1982)
- Simon Ward (1941–2012) (ashes sprinkled into the English Channel)
- Virginia Weidler (1927–1968)
- William A. Wellman (1896–1975)
- H. G. Wells (1866–1946)
- Brett Weston (1911–1993)
- Barry White (1944–2003) (ashes spread over the Pacific Ocean)
- Kenneth Whiting (1881–1943)
- James Whitmore (1921–2009)
- Andy Williams (1927–2012)
- Esther Williams (1921–2013)
- Guy Williams (1924–1989) (ashes sprinkled off Point Dume)
- John Williams (1903–1983)
- Robin Williams (1951–2014) (ashes sprinkled off San Francisco Bay)
- Flip Wilson (1933–1998)
- Ne Win (1911–2002)
- Eddie Van Halen (1955–2020)
- Archie Van Winkle (1925–1986)
- Edward Winter (1937–2001)
- Ed Wood (1924–1978)
- Katherine Woodville (1938–2013)
- Susannah York (1939-2011)
- Sam Yorty (1909–1998)
- Faron Young (1932–1996)
- Jon Zazula (1952–2022)
- Zeng Xueming (1905–1991)
- Zhang Huaxiang (1987–2016)
- Zhou Enlai (1898–1976)
- Harry von Zell (1906–1981)
