= Ishwari Rajya Lakshmi Devi Shah =

Ishwari

Queen consort of Nepal
- Tenure: March 1919 – 13 March 1955
- Born: September 1907; Sitapur, Kheri, British India
- Died: 27 June 1983 (aged 75–76); Narayanhity Royal Palace, Kathmandu, Kingdom of Nepal
- Spouse: Tribhuvan of Nepal (m. 1919; died 1955)
- Issue: Prince Basundhara; Princess Nalini
Names
- Ishwari Rajya Lakshmi Devi Shah
- House: Shah dynasty (by marriage)
- Father: Arjan Singh Sahib
- Mother: Krishnavati Devi Sahiba
- Religion: Hinduism

Ishwari Rajya Lakshmi Devi Shah (September 1907 – 27 June 1983) was the queen consort and the second wife of Tribhuvan Bir Bikram Shah, King of the Kingdom of Nepal. She was the mother of Prince Basundhara Bir Bikram Shah and Princess Nalini Rajya Lakshmi Devi.

== Life ==
She was the daughter of Arjan Singh Sahib, Raja of Chhatara, Barhgaon and Oudh and his wife, Krishnavati Devi Sahiba.

She was married (at a young age in an arranged custom) at the Narayanhity Royal Palace, Kathmandu, in March 1919, to King Tribhuvan of Nepal as his second wife, in a double ceremony with her older sister Kanti, as his first wife.

She and her husband had two children:

- Prince Basundhara of Nepal (25 November 1921 – 31 August 1977), who married Princess Helen Shah of Nepal and had three daughters; Princess Jayanti, Mrs. Ketaki Chester, Princess Jyotshana.
- Princess Nalini of Nepal (24 September 1924 – 11 June 2020). She married Shiv Rattan Dev Singh, Raja of Poonch and had three daughters (Hemlata Rajye, Rajni Kumari, and Urmila Kumari) and two sons (Raman Dev Singh and Ratish Dev Singh).

In 1948, Erica Leuchtag, a German physiotherapist, who had been serving the royal family of Patiala was invited to treat Queen Kanti. Leuchtag also treated the King and reportedly befriended many members of the Nepali royal family including the junior Queen Ishwari and the Princesses Nalini, Vijaya and Bharati inside the Narayanhiti Palace during her time in Nepal when the royal family was not allowed to leave the palace by the Rana rulers. This account has been detailed in Leuchtag's book Erica and the King.

During the reign of King Mahendra, the Queen Mothers, Kanti and Ishwari wished to establish a university in Nepal to meet the needs of the nation as the existing colleges were affiliated with Patna University of India and thus adhered to its prescribed courses, policies, rules, and regulations. As such, the University Commission was established on March 31, 1956, with the senior Queen Mother Kanti serving as the chairman and the junior Queen Mother Ishwari serving as the Vice Chairman. The two Queen Mothers laid down the foundation stone on June 25, 1958, and even personally donated 375 ropanis of land in Lalitpur designated for their widowhood by their late husband King Tribhuvan. As a result, Tribhuvan University was established on June 25, 1959.

== Honours ==
- Member of the Order of the Benevolent Ruler (1954).
- King Mahendra Coronation Medal (2 May 1956).
- King Birendra Coronation Medal (24 February 1975).

Royal titles
Preceded by Divyeshwari	Queen consort of Nepal; 1919–1955	Succeeded by Ratna
