= Tribhuvan Sadan =

Mansion in Nepal

- त्रिभुवन सदन
- Former names: Happy Cottage

General information
- Status: Being rebuilt
- Location: Narayanhiti Palace
- Town or city: Kathmandu
- Country: Nepal
- Coordinates: 27.715450841455088°N 85.31746608557542°E
- Named for: King Tribhuvan of Nepal
- Owner: Narayanhiti Palace Museum

The Tribhuvan Sadan (Nepali: त्रिभुवन सदन) is a mansion in the Narayanhiti Palace, Kathmandu, Nepal. It is known for being the site of the Nepalese royal massacre where ten members of the royal family, including King Birendra, Queen Aishwarya, and Crown Prince Dipendra were killed. The mansion was formerly occupied by King Tribhuvan and his family and later by Dipendra, Crown Prince of Nepal. The Tribhuvan Sadan was demolished after the orders of the Queen Mother Ratna however it is currently being reconstructed.

== History ==
King Tribhuvan lived in the Tribhuvan Sadan with his family and he rebuilt the mansion after it was destroyed by the 1934 Nepal earthquake. It was originally known as the Happy Cottage but it was later renamed after King Tribhuvan. It was later occupied by Dipendra, Crown Prince of Nepal who had lived with his family at the Shree Sadan, but, he had moved after the coronation of King Birendra as the king of Nepal as he was not allowed to live with his father until he turned 18 due to royal tradition.

On 1 June 2001, the infamous Nepalese royal massacre took place in the Tribhuvan Sadan where ten members of the royal family, including King Birendra, Queen Aishwarya, and Crown Prince Dipendra, were killed in a mass shooting. The Tribhuvan Sadan was demolished after the orders of the Queen Mother Ratna Rajya Lakshmi Devi Shah. However, this decision became controversial and it aided in conspiracy theories about the massacre. After its demolition, only a small portion of the wall and the layout of the building remained. After the downfall of the monarchy, Narayanhiti Palace was turned into a museum and the museum had added labels where the rooms of the Tribhuvan Sadan were located.

In 2009, then Prime Minister Madhav Kumar Nepal said in a speech that the Tribhuvan Sadan would be rebuilt. In 2015, part of the mansion was built and other parts were being reconstructed. Next year, the reconstruction of the Tribhuvan Sadan was reported to be nearly finished. Ministry of General Administration said that the reconstruction of the mansion will provide proof about the massacre to Nepalis.
