= Lal Bahadur Lamteri =

Lal Bahadur Lamteri (Magar)
- लाल बहादुर लम्तेरी मगर
- Occupation: Soldier
- Known for: Witnessed the Nepalese royal massacre

Lal Bahadur Lamteri (also Lal Bahadur Lamteri Magar) is a Nepalsese soldier on duty at Narayanhity Palace who have witnessed the Nepalese royal massacre and claimed that prince Dipendra was already dead when the shooting incident happened. He said he saw masked men wearing Dipendra look alike and shoot Dipendra in the first place. Currently he is serving jail sentence for anonymous case which has been protesting by few people and groups.
