= Prince Basundhara of Nepal =

Basundhara Bir Bikram Shah
- Prince of Nepal
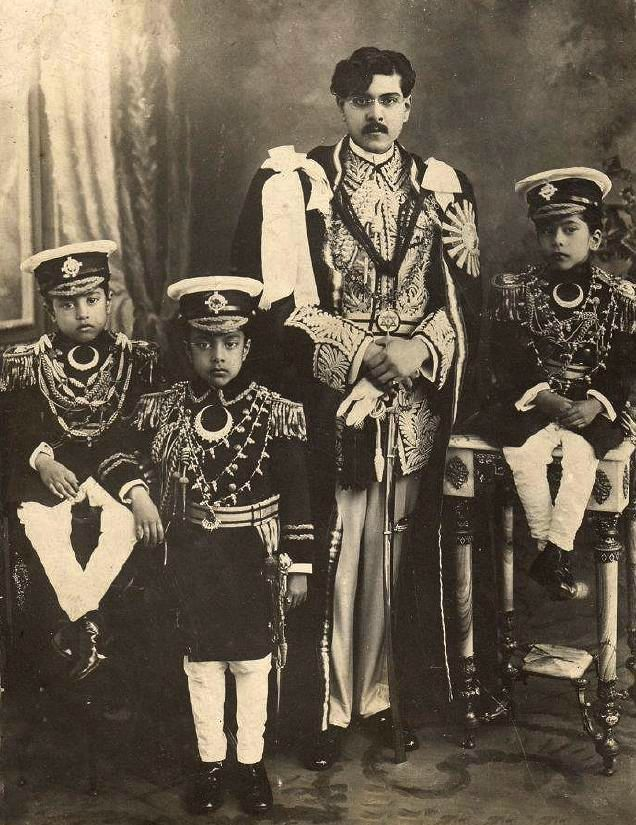
- King Tribhuvan and his sons; Mahendra (standing), Basundhara and Himalaya (sitting) in 1932.
- Born: 25 November 1921; Narayanhity Royal Palace, Kathmandu, Nepal
- Died: 31 August 1977 (aged 55); Bir Hospital, Kathmandu, Nepal
- Spouse: Princess Helen Shah (m. 1945) Ramola Devi (m. 1948)
- Issue: Princess Jayanti Shah; Mrs. Ketaki Chester; Princess Jyotshana Basnyat; Jyoti Rajya Lakshmi Devi Singha
Regnal name
- Basundhara Bir Bikram Shah Dev
- House: Shah dynasty (by birth)
- Father: Tribhuvan of Nepal
- Mother: Ishwari Rajya Lakshmi Devi
- Religion: Hinduism

Prince Basundhara Bir Bikram Shah of Nepal, GCMG (25 November 1921 – 31 August 1977) was a son of King Tribhuvan of Nepal.

== Life ==
Prince Basundhara was a son of King Tribhuvan and his second wife Queen Ishwari. His name, Basundhara, means "wealth, prosperity and abundance".

He was one of the most popular members of the Nepalese royal family. The prince was educated under private tutors and was greatly interested in sports. From 1962 to 1975, he was the president of Nepal Olympic Committee; he also served as the president of Royal Nepal Golf Club, and, from 1961 to 1975, was the chairman of National Sports Council.

He married Princess Helen Shah on 17 June 1945 in Kathmandu, and they had three daughters:

- Princess Jayanti Shah (1946–2001); she was killed in the Nepalese royal massacre.
- Mrs. Ketaki Chester (14 January 1948 in Kathmandu – 20 November 2026); she renounced her titles of Princess of Nepal and Rajya Lakshmi Devi on her second marriage to a British airline pilot.
- Princess Jyotshana Basnyat.

He also married Ramola Devi (1923–2000), a writer [pen name Chhinnalata], in 1948 and they had one daughter:

- Jyoti Rajya Lakshmi Devi Singha (born on 25 November 1954).

Prince Basundhara died on 31 August 1977, at the Bir Hospital, Kathmandu.

== Honours ==
=== National honours ===
- Member of the Order of the Benevolent Ruler (1951).
- Tribhuvan Order of the Footprint of Democracy, 1st class (30 September 1959).
- Member of the Order of the Star of Nepal, 1st class.
- Member of the Order of Om Rama Patta (Order of Rama Mantra Power).
- King Mahendra Coronation Medal (2 May 1956).
- King Birendra Coronation Medal (24 February 1975).

=== Foreign honours ===
- Honorary Grand Cross of the Order of St Michael and St George [GCMG]. United Kingdom

== Ancestry ==
Ancestors of Prince Basundhara of Nepal

16. King Surendra Bikram Shah of Nepal
8. Trailokya, Crown Prince of Nepal
17. Trailokya Rajya Lakshmi Devi
4. King Prithvi Bir Bikram Shah Dev of Nepal
18. Jang Bahadur Kunwar Ranaji, 1st Maharaja of Lamjung and Kaski
9. Lalit Rajeshwori Rajya Lakshmi Devi
19. Hiranyagarbha Kumari Devi
2. King Tribhuvan Bir Bikram Shah Dev of Nepal
5. Divyeshwari Rajya Lakshmi Devi
1. Prince Basundhara Bir Bikram Shah Dev
6. Arjan Singh Sahib, Raja of Chhatara, Barhgaon and Oudh
3. Ishwari Rajya Lakshmi Devi
7. Krishnavati Devi Sahiba
