= Nepalese royal massacre =

2001 killing of royal family members

- राजदरबार हत्याकाण्ड
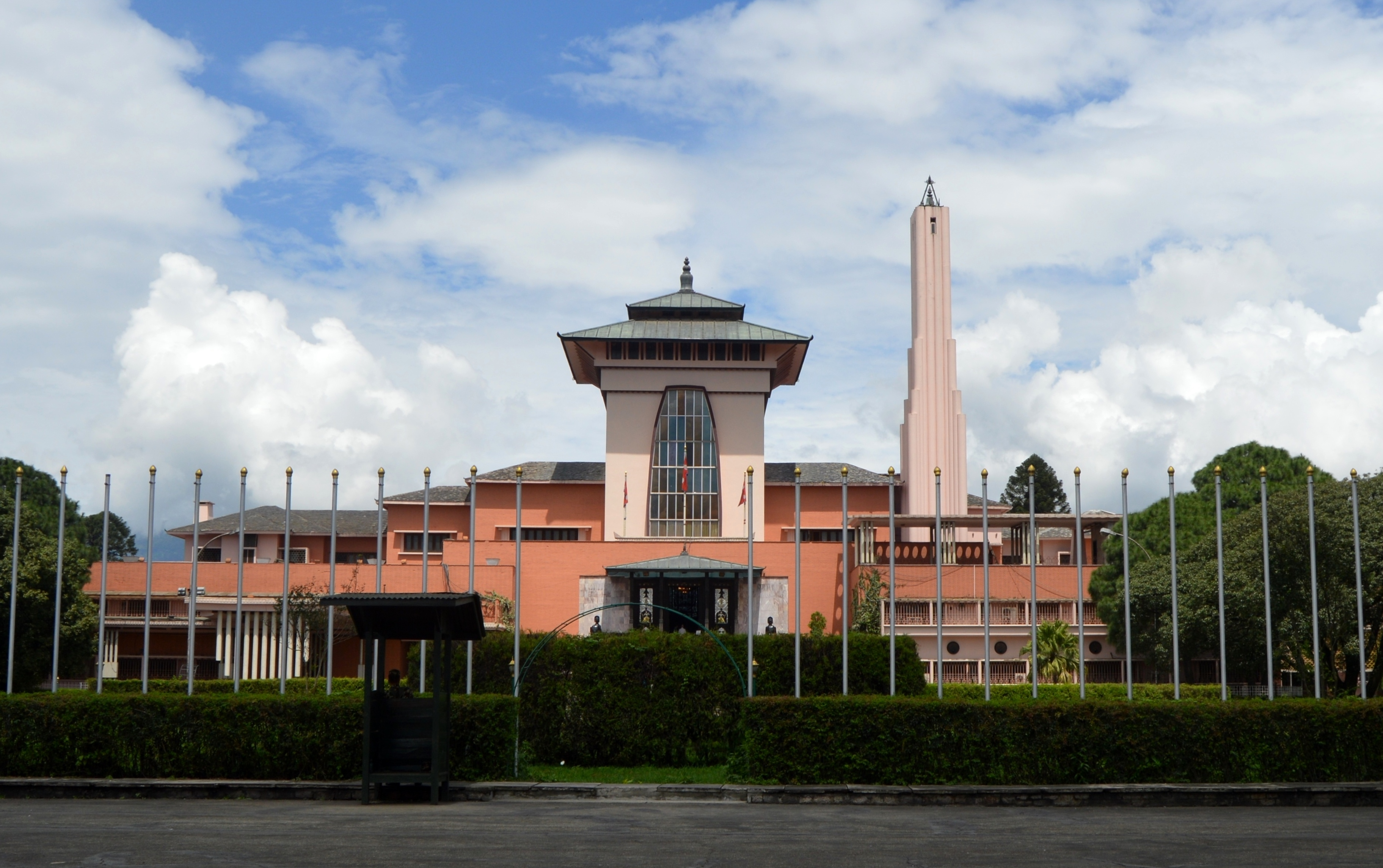
- The Narayanhiti Palace, former home of the royal family. Following the abolition of the monarchy, the building and its grounds have been turned into a museum.
- Location: 27.7156°N 85.32°E; Tribhuvan Sadan, Narayanhiti Durbar, Kathmandu, Nepal
- Date: 1 June 2001; 25 years ago
- Target: Nepalese royal family
- Attack type: Mass shooting, familicide, regicide, murder-suicide
- Weapons: Colt Model 733 carbine; H&K MP5K 9 mm submachine gun; Franchi SPAS-12 shotgun; Glock 19
- Deaths: 10 (including the perpetrator)
- Injuries: 5
- Perpetrator: Dipendra of Nepal

The Nepalese royal massacre (also called Durbar Hatyakanda, दरबार हत्याकाण्ड) was a mass shooting which occurred on 1 June 2001 (19 Jestha 2058 Nepal B.S.) at the Narayanhiti Palace, the then-residence of the Nepali monarchy, resulting in the deaths of nine members of the royal family, including King Birendra and Queen Aishwarya. A government-appointed inquiry team named Crown Prince Dipendra as the perpetrator of the massacre. Dipendra was declared king following the death of his parents but was comatose after shooting himself at the scene; he died in a hospital three days later without regaining consciousness. He was succeeded by Gyanendra, his paternal uncle and Birendra's younger brother.

== Background ==
Birendra became king of Nepal in 1972 following the death of his father King Mahendra, inheriting an absolute monarchy known as the Panchayat system. After a referendum on restoring multi-party democracy was rejected in 1980, Birendra relinquished his executive powers in response to the 1990 People's Movement and abolished the Panchayat system. His later role as a constitutional monarch made him very popular and well-respected by the Nepalese population.

After Birendra's accession to the throne, the Shah dynasty began a custom of organising a private family dinner on the third Friday of each month in the Nepalese calendar, with different members exchanging hosting duties. The scheduled dinner event on 1 June 2001 was to be hosted by Dipendra at his residence, the Tribhuvan Sadan within the complex of the Narayanhiti Palace. All main members of the royal family were invited, except for Prince Gyanendra, who was in Chitwan.

=== Motive ===
Dipendra's motive for the murders is unknown, and there are various theories. The most commonly mentioned theory cites his relationship with Devyani Rana, whom he had met in the United Kingdom and had been dating for several years. Some allege that the royal family had objected to their potential marriage due to her maternal family background and her father's political alliances. Devyani's mother was from the house of Scindia, the former ruling family of the Gwalior State whose members were lower-caste and allegedly far wealthier than the Nepalese monarchs. The prospective bride's mother warned her daughter that marrying the Nepalese crown prince might mean a drop in her standard of living.

Another theory alleges that Dipendra was unhappy with the country's shift from an absolute to a constitutional monarchy, and that too much power had been given away following the 1990 People's Movement. Others, such as Li Onesto, have argued that the shooting occurred in the context of the ongoing Maoist revolution in the Nepali countryside and was the product of disputes over how to deal with the uprising, in which Birendra had been reluctant to mobilise the army against the revolutionaries, in contrast to Gyanendra.

== Massacre ==
According to one recount of the events based on the official investigation and several eyewitness accounts, Dipendra arrived at the Tribhuvan Sadan in the evening and escorted guests to a billiard room within the palace. At the billiard room, Dipendra went under the influence of drugs and was removed and escorted to his apartment by relatives after "misbehaving" with one of the guests. Another version states that Birendra ordered him to be sent to the apartment after he failed to receive him at the venue. A testimony by Prince Paras, a cousin of Dipendra, suggested that Dipendra had argued with his parents over his intention to marry Devyani.

After being sent to his room, Dipendra conversed on the phone with Devyani, before returning to the billiard room wearing army fatigues and carrying a Heckler & Koch MP5 submachine gun. There, he opened fire, injuring Birendra in the neck and stomach, then returned with a Colt Commando carbine and ultimately shot him dead. Dipendra went on to kill eight other relatives, including his mother Queen Aishwarya; an uncle, Prince Dhirendra, who tried to persuade him to hand over his gun; and his brother Prince Nirajan, who was shielding Aishwarya in the garden. Dipendra slipped into a coma after shooting himself in the head. One of the eyewitness accounts said that the shooting took "no more than 15 minutes".

The casualties were immediately taken to the Birendra military hospital in Chhauni, where Birendra, Aishwarya and Nirajan were pronounced dead on arrival. Dipendra's sister Princess Shruti died of blood loss resulting from her injuries shortly after arriving at the hospital. Dipendra and Dhirendra succumbed to their injuries on 4 June, three days later, despite hospital treatment.

== Aftermath ==
External videos
- Video footage of the royal funeral procession on 2 June 2001

The deaths of King Birendra, Queen Aishwarya and Prince Nirajan were not officially announced until the following day at 13:30 (UTC+05:45). After confirming Birendra's death, the Raj Parishad (royal privy council) announced the proclamation of Dipendra as king and the appointment of Gyanendra, the closest surviving relative in the line of succession, as his regent. The deceased members of the royal family were given a state funeral and were cremated in front of Pashupatinath Temple.

Gyanendra was proclaimed king after Dipendra's death on 4 June, with the former's coronation and the latter's cremation taking place on the same day.

On 12 June 2001, a Hindu katto ceremony was held to exorcise or banish the spirit of the dead king from Nepal. A Hindu priest, Durga Prasad Sapkota, dressed as Birendra to symbolise the late king, rode an elephant out of Kathmandu and into symbolic exile, taking many of the monarch's belongings with him. A second katto ceremony was held for Dipendra on 14 June.

The massacre added to the political turmoil caused by the Maoist insurgency. Following the ascension of Gyanendra, the monarchy lost much of the approval of the Nepalese populace. This massacre is considered as the pivotal point that ended the monarchy in Nepal.

== Casualties ==
Birendra, Aishwarya and their children were killed, as were three of Birendra's siblings (Princess Shanti, Princess Sharada and Prince Dhirendra), Birendra's first cousin Princess Jayanti, and one of Birendra's brothers-in-law (Kumar Khadga, who was married to Princess Sharada). Princess Komal, the future queen consort, was also severely injured and was hospitalised for four weeks following the massacre.

Rabi Shumsher	Kumar Mahesh	Queen Mother Ratna	Princess Helen
Princess Shanti	Princess Sharada	Kumar Khadga	King Birendra	Queen Aishwarya	Prince Gyanendra	Princess Komal	Princess Shova	Prince Dhirendra	Princess Prekshya	Princess Jayanti	Ketaki Chester	Princess Jyotshana
Prince Dipendra	Princess Shruti	Kumar Gorakh	Prince Nirajan	Prince Paras	Princess Himani	Princess Prerana	Princess Puja	Rajiv Shahi	Princess Dilasha	Princess Sitashma
Died	Severely injured	Present	Absent	Sources:

== Reactions ==
=== Domestic ===
Members of the Nepali public reacted in shock and mourning to the killing of Birendra and his immediate family, with many demanding an explanation for the motive of the shooting. The funeral procession of the royal couple was attended by tens of thousands, and the government declared thirteen days of mourning, in accordance with Hindu custom, which also required men to shave their heads as a mark of respect. Flags in Nepal were also lowered to half-mast and access to radio and television media was restricted. Deputy Prime Minister Ram Chandra Paudel described the event as a "national disaster", after making a public statement about Dipendra's role in the massacre.

Protests continued during Gyanendra's coronation ceremony on 4 June, resulting in six deaths from police gunfire and arrests of hundreds suspected to be Maoists. A curfew was subsequently declared in Kathmandu. Travel warnings were issued for British and American citizens intending to travel to Nepal due to the violence.

=== International ===
Leaders and representatives of several countries expressed condolences in response to the deaths of King Birendra and Queen Aishwarya.

- Australia: Prime Minister John Howard expressed "hope that peace and order will be maintained in Nepal", describing Birendra as "a pillar of stability".
- Holy See: Pope John Paul II addressed Gyanendra in a telegram, expressing prayers for "divine blessings of comfort and peace upon all who are in mourning".
- India: The Union Cabinet held an emergency meeting to discuss the killings. It adopted a resolution of condolence and announced a three-day period of national mourning.
- Sri Lanka: President Chandrika Kumaratunga stated that she hoped that the country would "surmount this great national tragedy". A meeting of the South Asian Association for Regional Cooperation in Colombo was postponed as a mark of respect.
- Thailand: Prime Minister Thaksin Shinawatra described the massacre as a "heart-rending tragedy" and expressed condolences to the Nepalese people.
- United Kingdom: Queen Elizabeth II conveyed a message to Gyanendra expressing "shock and sadness at the news and of the long-standing and valued relationship between the two countries and families", according to a readout issued by Buckingham Palace. The Queen ordered flags to be flown at half-mast on royal palaces, government buildings, and the Second Battalion of the Royal Gurkha Rifles installation in Kent. Charles, Prince of Wales, said that he was "deeply shocked and saddened". Prime Minister Tony Blair described the massacre as a "dreadful tragedy", highlighting the close diplomatic and military relations between the United Kingdom and Nepal.
- United States: President George W. Bush extended condolences to the Nepalese royal family and people.
- United Nations: In a statement, Secretary-General Kofi Annan said he was "profoundly shocked" and called for "calm and stability in this difficult period".

Some media outlets described the massacre as the highest-profile murder of a royal family since the killings of the Romanov family of the former Russian Empire in 1918.

== Investigation ==
Gyanendra initially maintained that the deaths were the result of an "accidental discharge of an automatic weapon" within the royal palace. Later, he said that he made this claim due to "legal and constitutional hurdles" since under the constitution and by tradition, Dipendra could not have been charged with murder had he survived.

A two-man committee comprising Chief Justice Keshav Prasad Upadhyaya and Speaker of the House Taranath Ranabhat carried out a week-long investigation concerning the massacre. The investigation concluded, after interviewing more than a hundred people including eyewitnesses and palace officials, guards, and staff, that Dipendra was the perpetrator of the shooting.

== Conspiracy theories ==
Gyanendra's wife Komal and their children Prince Paras and Princess Prerana were present at the royal palace during the massacre. While the entire families of Birendra and Dipendra were killed, nobody in Gyanendra's family died—his son escaped with slight injuries, and his wife sustained a life-threatening bullet wound but survived. Much controversy surrounded the circumstances of the massacre, including the apparent lack of security at the dinner, the absence of Gyanendra, and Dipendra's self-inflicted head-wound located at his left temple, although he was right-handed. These factors, coupled with Birendra's and Dipendra's popularity, gave rise to conspiracy theories.

Some eyewitness statements released since the massacre alleged that "multiple people with the mask of the Crown Prince Dipendra were present in the room at one point", that the bodies of some of the royal family members were found elsewhere in the palace and not the dining hall, or that Dipendra was one of the first ones to be shot. There is a book titled "Raktakunda" based on interviews of two palace maids which details these theories. Promoters of these ideas alleged Gyanendra had a hand in the massacre so that he could assume the throne himself. His ascent to the throne would have been possible only if both of his nephews, Dipendra and Nirajan, were removed from the line of succession. Moreover, Gyanendra and his son Prince Paras were very unpopular. An eyewitness of the royal massacre, Lal Bahadur Magar, who was one of Dipendra's bodyguards, claimed that Paras perpetrated the massacre. During a public gathering, Pushpa Kamal Dahal, the chairman of the Nepalese Maoist Party, alleged that the massacre was planned by the Indian Research and Analysis Wing or the American Central Intelligence Agency.

Claims circulated in Nepalese media hypothesized that the perpetrator was not Dipendra but an individual who wore a mask to disguise himself as Dipendra; that Paras broke and threw away Dipendra's ventilator in hospital; that 900 were killed in the palace that night and the purpose of the curfews was to allow the disposal of their bodies; or that the public water supply and milk had been poisoned in Kathmandu. Conspiracy theories also blamed Ketaki Chester, Upendra Devkota, or the Nepalese army for the massacre. However, no reliable evidence have been found for these claims. Another theory, which alleged that Dipendra was not allowed to marry while under the age of 35 due to astrological reasons, was refuted by a royal astrologer.

== In popular culture ==
- Murder Most Royal or Nepal: Murder Most Royal is a 2002 documentary by Donna Sharpe produced for the BBC and aired on BBC2. It details the reasons for Dipendra perpetrating the massacre, including his forbidden marriage with Devyani Rana.
- Super Star (also released as Stupid), a 2002 Indian film loosely based on the love story of Dipendra of Nepal and Devyani Rana, and the Nepalese royal massacre.
- The massacre is featured in the third season of the documentary series Zero Hour, based on a reconstruction of the event taken from surviving eyewitnesses.
- The back story of Pagan Min, the main antagonist of the game Far Cry 4 (Ubisoft, 2014), which takes place in the fictional (but based on Nepal) kingdom of Kyrat seems to refer to this event in a modified version.

== See also ==
- List of massacres in Nepal
- List of regicides
- 2009 attack on the Dutch royal family
- Murder of the Romanov family

== Bibliography ==
- Garzilli, Enrica, "A Sanskrit Letter Written by Sylvain Lévi in 1923 to Hemarāja Śarmā Along With Some Hitherto Unknown Biographical Notes (Cultural Nationalism and Internationalism in the First Half of the 21st Cent.: Famous Indologists Write to the Raj Guru of Nepal – no. 1)", in Commemorative Volume for 30 Years of the Nepal-German Manuscript Preservation Project. Journal of the Nepal Research Centre, XII (2001), Kathmandu, ed. by A. Wezler in collaboration with H. Haffner, A. Michaels, B. Kölver, M. R. Pant and D. Jackson, pp. 115–149.
- Garzilli, Enrica, "Strage a palazzo, movimento dei Maoisti e crisi di governabilità in Nepal", in Asia Major 2002, pp. 143–160.
- Garzilli, Enrica, "A Sanskrit Letter Written by Sylvain Lévy in 1925 to Hemarāja Śarmā along with Some Hitherto Unknown Biographical Notes (Cultural Nationalism and Internationalism in the First Half of the 20th Century – Famous Indologists write to the Raj Guru of Nepal – No. 2)", in History of Indological Studies. Papers of the 12th World Sanskrit Conference Vol. 11.2, ed. by K. Karttunen, P. Koskikallio and A. Parpola, Motilal Banarsidass and University of Helsinki, Delhi 2015, pp. 17–53.
