= Chhinnalata =

Nepalese writer

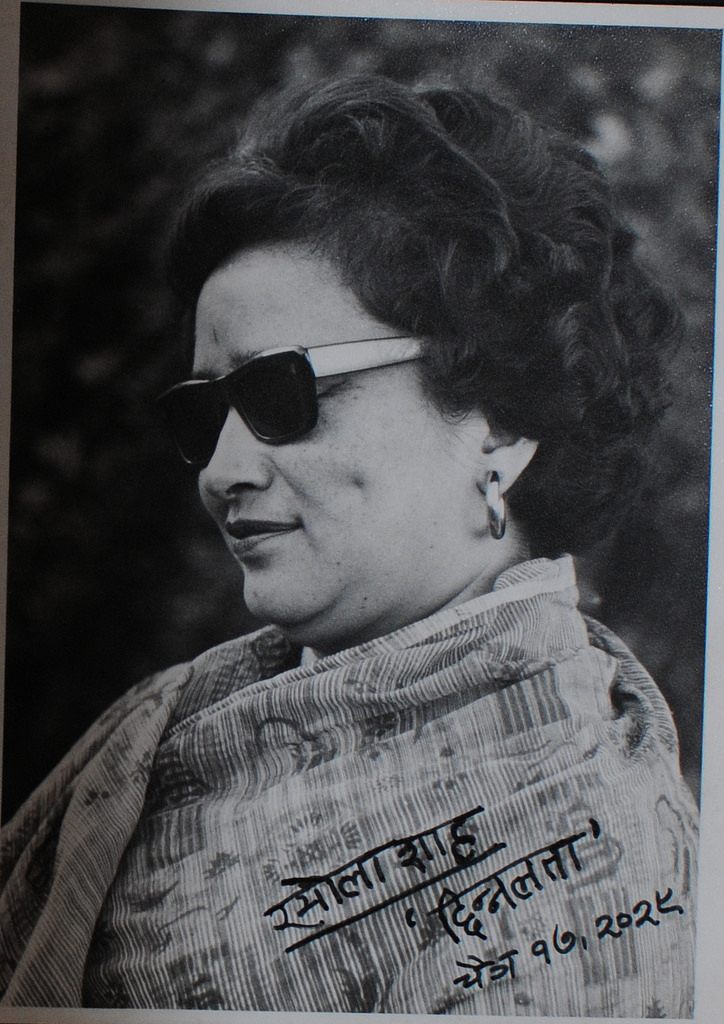
- Chhinnalata in 1973
- Born: Ramola Devi; 15 July 1923; Thyu, Bagh Bazar, Kathmandu, Nepal
- Died: 4 December 2000 (aged 77); Bir Hospital, Kathmandu, Nepal
- Other name: Ramola Devi Shah (by marriage)
- Spouse: Prince Basundhara (m. 1948; died 1977)
- Children: Jyoti Rajya Lakshmi Devi Singha
- Parents: Harkha Narayan (father); Heramanya (mother)

Ramola Devi Shah, better known as Chhinnalata (Nepali: छिन्नलता; 1923–2000) was a Nepalese writer and poet.

== Biography ==
Ramola Devi was born on 15 July 1923 in Thu, Bagh Bazar, Kathmandu, Nepal. She was married to Prince Basundhara. In 1983, she established a literary trust, Chhinnalata Geet Puraskar Guthi (CGPG).

Chhinnalata died from paralysis on 4 December 2000 at Bir Hospital. Chhinnalata Geet Puraskar, a music award, is named in her honour.

== Marriage and issue ==
In 1948, she married Prince Basundhara of Nepal.

They had one daughter: Jyoti Rajya Lakshmi Devi Singha (b. 1954), who shared a birthday with her father.

== Patronages ==
- President of the Nepal Women's Literary Association (1980–1982) [Adviser 1983–1985].

== Notable published works ==
- Interference
- Interrogation
- Intuition
- Spirit of Peace
- Inner Journey

== Honours ==
National honours

- Ratna Shri Swani Padak [Ratna Shri Swan Medal] (1975)
