= Mrigendra Raj Pandey =

Nepalese physician

Mrigendra Raj Pandey is a Nepalese physician from Kathmandu. He is one of the most senior doctors in Nepal and probably the first cardiologist in the country. He is the Nepal first Member of the Royal College of Physicians and also the FRCP from Edinburgh. He was also the personal physician to the King Mahendra. He was the founder chief-editor of the Journal of Nepal Medical Association from 1963 to 1964. He is the founder president of the Nepal Heart Foundation. He established the Mrigendra Samjhana Medical Trust in year 1975. He is Patron of Cardiac Society of Nepal. He is involved in various research activities of medical field in Nepal since long time.
