= Shree Sadan =

- श्री सदन

General information
- Location: Narayanhiti Palace, Kathmandu, Nepal
- Coordinates: 27.715206996997672°N 85.32070163624135°E

Shree Sadan (Nepali: श्री सदन) is a three-storey cottage used by King Birendra and his family.

Shree Sadan was opened to the public in November 2020. It spans over 754 ropanis of land.

== See also ==
- Tribhuvan Sadan
