= Katto =

Ritual following death of Nepali kings

Katto (Nepali: काट्टो) is a ceremonial ritual performed by the Shah dynasty of Nepal, and observed following the deaths of its kings. In 2001, when a massacre in the royal palace saw two kings die in less than a week, the "katto khane" ritual was reported very explicitly.

The ceremony is performed on the eleventh day after the king's death. In this ceremony, a vegetarian Brahmin is made to eat an elaborate non-vegetarian meal, given various items belonging to the deceased king as gifts and made to wear clothing belonging to the deceased king in the belief that by doing so, the partaker will absorb all the bad karma of the dead king. The stigmatized Brahmin is then put on the back of an elephant and ordered to leave the kingdom.

Many Nepalese believe that the katto meal consists of parts from the body of the deceased king. However, Ramesh Prasad Pande, the royal Brahmin who oversaw the rituals after the royal massacre in 2001 revealed that no such thing occurred, and such hearsay are just myths. Durga Prasad Sapkota and Devi Prasad Acharya, who performed the katto ritual of King Birendra and King Dipendra stated that the ritual is symbolic.

Katto rituals used to be performed by Indian Brahmins in the past. The katto ritual of King Tribhuvan was performed by Bhatta Brahmin from India. The katto ritual of King Mahendra was performed by Shri Ganesh Bhatta.
