= Princess Jyotshana Basnyat of Nepal =

Princess Jyotshana Basnyat
- Princess of Nepal
- Spouse: Singha Bahadur Basnyat (m. 1974; died 2019)
- Issue: Sharada Basnyat; Vivek Basnyat; Suvash Basnyat
Names
- Jyotshana Rajya Lakshmi Devi Basnyat of Nepal
- House: Shah dynasty (by birth)
- Father: Prince Basundhara
- Mother: Princess Helen Shah
- Religion: Hinduism

Princess Jyotshana Rajya Lakshmi Devi Basnyat of Nepal is a member of the former Nepalese royal family. Jyotshana and her late husband, diplomat Singha Bahadur Basnyat, have worked to internationally promote Nepalese culture.

== Background ==
Princess Jyotshana's father, Prince Basundhara of Nepal, was a son of King Tribhuvan. Jyotshana's mother, Princess Helen Shah, was from the aristocratic Rana dynasty. Her mother's sister Princep married Prince Himalaya, another son of King Tribhuvan.

Princess Jyotshana has two sisters: Princess Jayanti, who was killed in the Nepalese royal massacre, and Ketaki Chester, who was severely injured (she renounced her title in the '70s).

== Marriage and children ==
In 1974, Princess Jyotshana married Dr. Singha Bahadur Basnyat (died on 5 February 2019), a diplomat of Basnyat family of Dilli Bazar, in Kathmandu.

They had three children, a daughter and two sons:

- Sharada Basnyat.
- Vivek Basnyat.
- Suvash Basnyat.

== Life ==
Princess Jyotshana's husband was a diplomat, and the ambassador to Egypt from 1980 to 1984, the ambassador to the United Kingdom from 1997 to 2003. Also he is the chairman of Jayanti Memorial Trust.

Princess Jyotshana is the patron of Britain Nepal Society, whose president is Prince Richard, Duke of Gloucester.

Princess Jyotshana her husband have worked to promote Nepalese culture internationally. Singha Basnyat has promoted the performance of Nepalese artists, for example at Millennium Dome in London in May 2000.

In 2001, ten members of the Nepalese royal family died in the Nepalese royal massacre. Among the people who died was Princess Jayanti, Jyotshana's elder sister. After the tragedy, Princess Jyotshana and her husband turned to music for solace. They released a CD, In Memoriam. Samjhanama Shrutika Lahar. They compiled the classics of Madhav Prasad Ghimire, Chandani Shah and Laxmi Prasad Devkota with British pianist Alisdair Campbell and arrangements by guitarist Anil Shai. Princess Jyotshana lent her voice, and her children- Sharada, Vivek and Suvash, also collaborated in this tribute. The proceeds of the CD went to Jayanti Memorial Trust, a trust established for cardiac patients in memory of Princess Jyotshana's deceased sister.

Princess Jyotshana and her husband are also well known for their skills in tennis. They have participated in many tournaments held for diplomats in London.

Jyotshana Basnyat is the patron of Jayanti Memorial Trust, which was established by her mother, Princess Helen Shah, in memory of the deceased Princess Jayanti.

In 2008, monarchy in Nepal was abolished. All the members of the royal family lost their titles and privileges.

== Patronages ==
- Patron of Britain Nepal Society (BNS).
- Patron of Jayanti Memorial Trust (JMT).
