= Princess Helen Shah of Nepal =

Princess of Nepal

Princess Helen Shah of Nepal श्री ५ अधिराजकुमारी हेलेन शाहको
- Princess of Nepal
- Born: 21 September 1932; Bahadur Bhawan, Kathmandu, Kingdom of Nepal
- Died: 12 September 2007 (aged 74); Birendra Hospital, Chhauni, Kathmandu, Kingdom of Nepal
- Spouse: Prince Basundhara of Nepal (m. 1945; died 1977)
- Issue: Princess Jayanti Shah of Nepal; Mrs. Ketaki Chester; Princess Jyotshana Basnyat of Nepal
Names
- Princess Helen Rajya Lakshmi Devi Shah of Nepal
- Dynasty: Rana (by birth); Shah (by marriage)
- Father: Nara Shamsher Jang Bahadur Rana
- Mother: Uma Rajya Lakshmi
- Religion: Hinduism

Princess Helen Rajya Lakshmi Devi Shah of Nepal (Nepali: श्री ५ अधिराजकुमारी हेलेन शाहको; 21 September 1932 – 12 September 2007) was a member of the former Nepalese royal family. Princess Helen Shah was the wife of Prince Basundhara of Nepal, a son of King Tribhuvan of Nepal and his second wife, Queen Ishwari.

== Life ==
Princess Helen Shah was born at the Bahadur Bhawan, Kathmandu. She was the younger daughter of General Nara Shamsher Jang Bahadur Rana, KCVO, sometime Inspector-General of the Royal Nepal Police, by his first wife, Uma Rajya Lakshmi, of Doti. She has an older sister, Princep, who went on to marry Prince Himalaya of Nepal.

She married Prince Basundhara on 17 June 1945 in Kathmandu.

They had three children:

- Princess Jayanti Shah (1946–2001); she was killed in the Nepalese royal massacre.
- Mrs. Ketaki Chester (1948–2026); she renounced her title on her second marriage to a British airline pilot.
- Princess Jyotshana Basnyat.

From 1977 to 1990, she was a member of Rajsabha, and had also served as chairperson of the Nepal Red Cross Society from 1981 to 1990. She worked to promote tourism and raised awareness about women's rights.

On the evening of 1 June 2001, ten members of the Nepalese royal family were murdered, including Helen's eldest daughter, Princess Jayanti. Her second daughter, Ketaki, was also wounded, but survived. During the massacre, Helen was with her sister-in-law, Queen Mother Ratna (the widow of King Mahendra), in the anteroom, and thus the two women survived. They heard the gunshots but did not take them seriously. A few minutes later, Prince Paras came and told the two women what had happened.

In memory of her eldest daughter, Princess Helen established the Jayanti Memorial Trust (JMT), which works to fight against cardiac diseases, as Princess Jayanti had worked hard to help heart patients and making cardiac treatment more affordable and reachable to the common people of Nepal.

Princess Helen owned Hotel de l'Annapurna, one of the five-star hotels in the capital, the travel agency "Yeti Travels" and a resort in Pokhara, Fishtail Lodge, which was frequently targeted by the Maoist guerrillas during the decade-old insurgency.

Princess Helen died of peritoneal cancer on 12 September 2007 at the King Birendra Military Hospital in Chhauni.

== Honours ==
=== National ===
- Member of the Order of Om Rama Patta (23 October 2001).
- Member of the Order of the Three Divine Powers, 1st class.
- Member of the Order of the Gurkha Right Hand, 1st class (24 February 1975).
- King Mahendra Coronation Medal (2 May 1956).
- King Birendra Coronation Medal (24 February 1975).
- Daibi Prakop Piditoddhar Padak [Natural Disaster Management Medal].
- Commemorative Silver Jubilee Medal of King Birendra (31 January 1997).
- King Gyanendra Investiture Medal (4 June 2001).

=== Foreign ===
- Japan : Dame Grand Cordon of the Order of the Precious Crown.
