= Princess Jayanti of Nepal =

Princess Jayanti Shah
- Princess of Nepal
- Born: 4 August 1946; Kathmandu, Nepal
- Died: 1 June 2001 (aged 54); Narayanhity Royal Palace, Kathmandu, Nepal
- Cause of death: Assassination (gunshot wounds)
Names
- Jayanti Rajya Lakshmi Devi Shah of Nepal
- House: Shah dynasty (by birth)
- Father: Prince Basundhara of Nepal
- Mother: Princess Helen of Nepal
- Religion: Hinduism

Princess Jayanti Rajya Lakshmi Devi Shah of Nepal (4 August 1946 – 1 June 2001) was a member of the Nepalese royal family. She was a granddaughter of King Tribhuvan of Nepal. An active social worker, she was known for her contributions to cancer relief programs in Nepal. She was one of the members of the Nepalese royal family who were killed in the June 2001 Nepalese royal massacre.

== Early life and education ==
Princess Jayanti was the first daughter of Prince Basundhara of Nepal and his first wife Princess Helen Shah of Nepal. Princess Jayanti was educated in Woodstock School, an international residential school in Mussoorie, Uttarakhand, India, and in Loreto Convent, Darjeeling. She graduated from Tribhuvan University in 1970.

== Social works ==
Princess Jayanti made significant contributions to cancer relief programs in Nepal. She was the founder of the Nepal Cancer Relief Society, and was its chairperson from 1982 to 2001. She involved various international organizations to establish a cancer hospital in Nepal, raised social awareness, and led anti-smoking campaigns.

Since her childhood, Princess Jayanti had seen different members of her family suffering from heart diseases, and therefore, she tried to help people suffering from heart diseases and worked to make cardiac treatment more affordable and available to the common people of Nepal.

Princess Jayanti also worked to promote tourism. In addition, she was also aware about different environmental issues. All her life she worked to raise social awareness. She attended international conferences and presented different papers in Europe and America.

== Death ==
Princess Jayanti was one of the ten members of the Nepalese royal family who died in the Nepalese royal massacre. Jayanti's younger sister, Mrs. Ketaki Chester, was wounded but survived. Jayanti's mother, Princess Helen, was not present in the room at the time of the massacre and therefore survived. She was in the anteroom with the Queen Mother, Ratna, her sister-in-law.

== Legacy ==
Princess Jayanti's mother, Princess Helen, established the Jayanti Memorial Trust (JMT) in her (Jayanti's) memory. The trust works to fight cardiac diseases. Besides her work for cancer relief programs, Princess Jayanti had also worked to help heart patients and to make cardiac treatment more available to the people of Nepal.

The Princess Jayanti Achievement Award Ceremony is collaboratively arranged by Hotel Annapurna and Jayanti Memorial Trust. The award is named after her and aims to empower women. Every year, it honours three female students attending Nepal Academy of Tourism and Hotel Management (NATHM) who have topped in their respective academic year.

== Honours ==
=== National honours ===
- Member of the Order of the Gurkha Right Hand, 1st class.
- King Mahendra Coronation Medal (2 May 1956).
- King Birendra Coronation Medal (25 February 1975).
- Commemorative Silver Jubilee Medal of King Birendra (31 January 1997).

== Ancestry ==
Ancestors of Princess Jayanti of Nepal

16. Trailokya, Crown Prince of Nepal
8. King Prithvi of Nepal
17. Lalit Rajeshwori Rajya Lakshmi Devi
4. King Tribhuvan of Nepal
9. Divyeshwari Rajya Lakshmi Devi
2. Prince Basundhara of Nepal
10. Arjan Singh Sahib, Raja of Chhatara, Barhgaon and Oudh
5. Ishwari Rajya Lakshmi Devi
11. Krishnavati Devi Sahiba
1. Princess Jayanti Shah of Nepal
24. Juddha Shamsher Jang Bahadur Rana, Maharaja of Lambjang and Kaski
12. Sir Bahadur Shamsher Jang Bahadur Rana, Maharaja of Lambjang and Kaski
25. Jetha Bada Maharani Padma Kumari
6. Nara Shamsher Jang Bahadur Rana, Maharaja of Lambjang and Kaski
13. Chandra Rajya Lakshmi
3. Helen Rajya Lakshmi Devi
7. Uma Rajya Lakshmi
