= Upendra Devkota =

Nepalese neurosurgeon (1953 – 2018)

- उपेन्द्र देवकोटा
- Born: 18 December 1953; Gorkha, Nepal
- Died: 18 June 2018 (aged 64); Bansbari, Nepal
- Education: Amar Jyoti Janata Secondary School Gorkha; Amrit Science College Kathmandu.
- Occupation: Neurosurgeon / Consultant
- Years active: 1973; 1999—2018
- Spouse: Madhu Dixit Devkota
- Children: Three daughters

Upendra Devkota (Nepali: उपेन्द्र देवकोटा; 18 December 1953 – 18 June 2018) was a Nepali neurosurgeon and founder of the first neurological trauma unit in Nepal, located at Bir Hospital. He held the post of Minister for Health, Science and Technology, Government of Nepal. Devkota was the founder of the National Institute of Neurological and Allied Sciences, the first institute dedicated to Neurosciences in the country, and known as the father of Modern Neurosurgery in Nepal.

== Biography ==
He was born in Gorkha in 1953 and received his high school education in Amar Jyoti Janata High School (commonly known as Luintel High School of Gorkha), Palungtar, Gorkha, Nepal. He was a classmate friend of Baburam Bhattarai from class eight to Isc. He did intermediate of sciences (I Sc) education from Amrit Science college, Tribhuvan University, Kathmandu, Nepal and got Colombo Plan fellowship to pursue medical education in India. He completed Bachelor of Medicine and Bachelor of Surgery (MBBS) in 1978 from Assam Medical College, Dibrugarh, Assam, India and worked some years in Bir Hospital under Dr DN Gongol. He had also been a Health Minister of then His Majesty government of Nepal.

For advanced training in neurosurgery, he went to the United Kingdom, where he trained at Atkinson Morley Hospital (now part of St Georges Hospital), Southern General Hospital Glasgow. He returned to Nepal in 1989 and started Neurosurgery in Bir Hospital. In 2006, he established National Institute of Neurological and Allied Sciences(NINAS) in Bansbari, Kathmandu, Nepal.

== Personal life ==
He died of cholangiocarcinoma on 18 June 2018. He has three daughters and a wife.

== Gallery ==
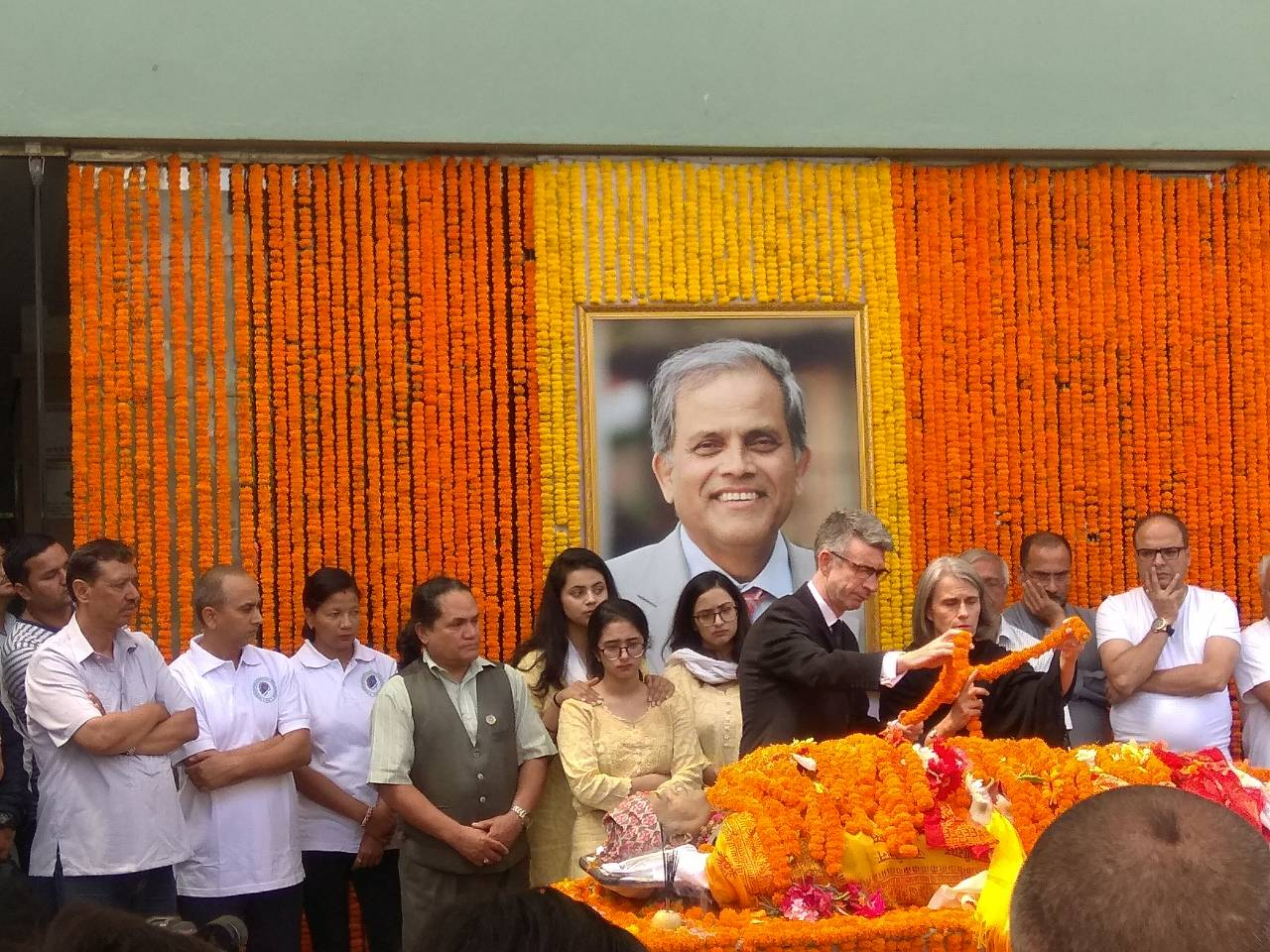
British ambassador to Nepal paying homage to Dr. Devkota

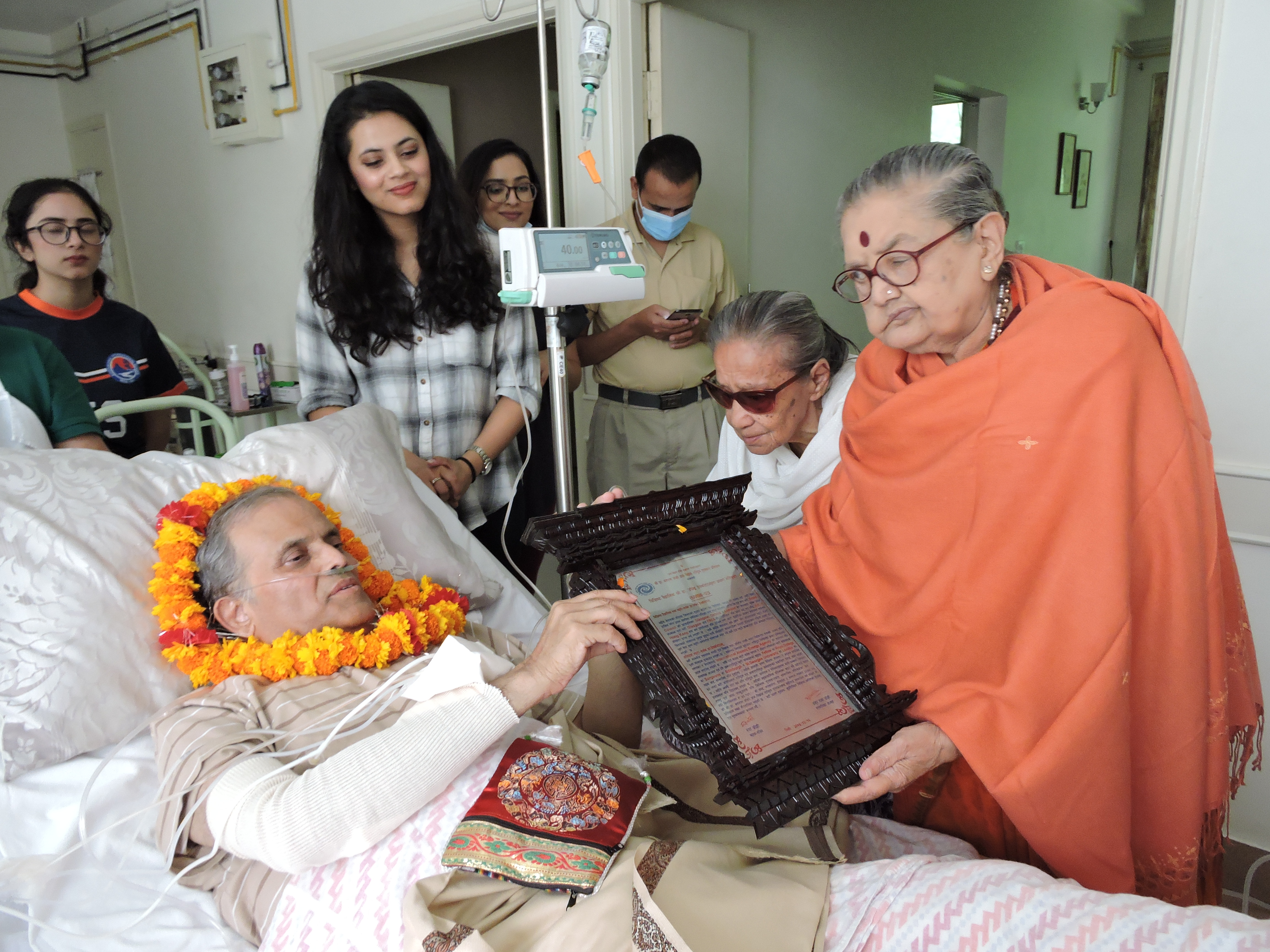
Dr. Devkota while receiving the Dr. Balaram Joshi Gyan Bigyan prize

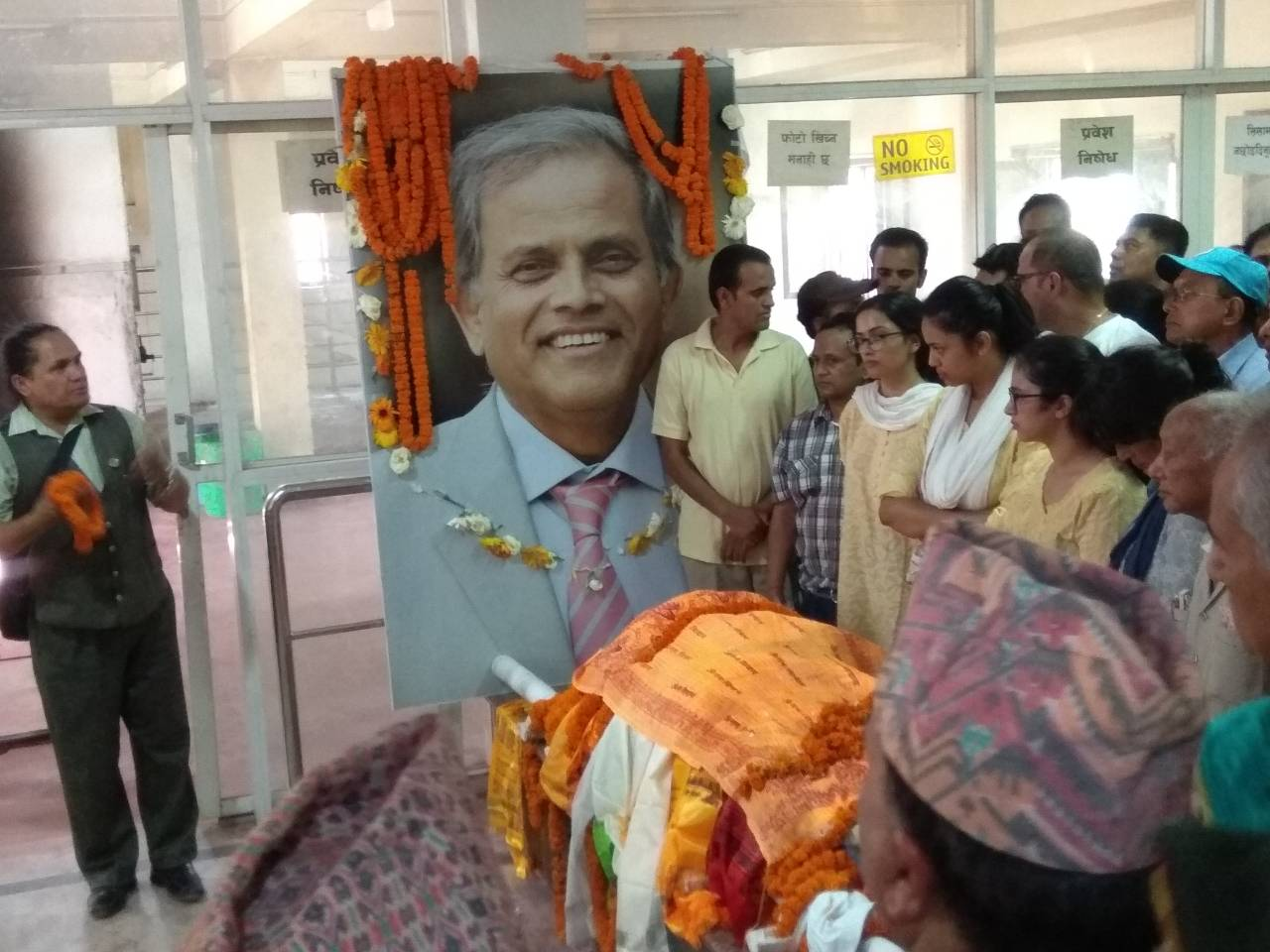
Dr. Devkota being honoured before cremation
