= Journal of Nepal Medical Association =

- Discipline: Medicine
- Language: English, Nepali
- Edited by: Ashis Shrestha

Publication details
- History: 1963–present
- Publisher: Nepal Medical Association (Nepal)
- Frequency: Monthly
- Open access: Yes
- License: CC-BY

Standard abbreviations
- ISO 4: J. Nepal Med. Assoc.

Indexing
- ISSN: 0028-2715 (print); 1815-672X (web)

Links
- Journal homepage; Online archive2

The Journal of Nepal Medical Association is a monthly peer-reviewed open-access medical journal from Nepal. It was established in 1963.

It is published by Nepal Medical Association, a professional association of doctors in Nepal. The current editor-in-chief is Dr. Ashis Shrestha, who was appointed in March 2024.

== History ==
The journal was established in September 1963. The first editor-in-chief was Dr. Mrigendra Raj Pandey.

== Abstracting and indexing ==
The journal is abstracted and indexed in:

- CAB Abstracts
- Embase
- Index Medicus/MEDLINE/PubMed
- International Bibliography of Periodical Literature
- Science Citation Index Expanded
- Scopus

== Past editors ==
The following persons are of have been editor-in-chief:

- Mrigendra Raj Pandey (1963–1964)
- Hemang Dixit (1965–1967)
- BP Sharma (1967–1968)
- Moin Shah (1969–1970)
- YB Shrestha (1971–1972)
- Santosh Man Shrestha (1973)
- PR Satyal (1974–1976)
- Shyam Bahadur Pandey (1977–1978)
- Sanjib Dhungel (1979)
- Shyam Bahadur Pandey (1980)
- Tej S Malla (1981–1983)
- Narayan Bahadur Thapa(1984–1985)
- Sanjib Dhungel (1986)
- Ramesh Kant Adhikari (1987–1988)
- Mahendra Nepal (1989)
- Rakesh Prasad (1990)
- Mohan P Joshi (1991)
- Neelam Adhikari (1992)
- Nirakar Man Shrestha (1993)
- Bhagavat P Nepal (1994)
- Babu Ram Marasini (1995–1997)
- Ugra Narayan Pathak (1997–1998)
- Sudha Sharma (1999–2001)
- Ramesh P Acharya (2002–2004)
- Achala Vaidya (2005–2006)
- Kusum Thapa (2007–2011)
- Rabindra Pradhan (2011–2012)
- Angel Magar (2013–2023)
- Ashis Shrestha (2024–present)
