= Rajsabha =

Constitutional body in Nepal, 1962–1990

Raj Sabha (ne: राजसभा Nepali for "The King's Council") was a constitutional body in the Kingdom of Nepal provisioned by Constitution of Nepal 1962. It consisted of heads of other constitutional bodies and several members appointed by the king.

Rajsabha was replaced by Raj Parishad by Constitution of Nepal 1990.

The monarchy in Nepal was abolished on 28 May 2008, and therefore so were the king’s councils.
