= Bir Hospital =

Bir Hospital वीर अस्पताल
- Ministry of Health and Population (Nepal)

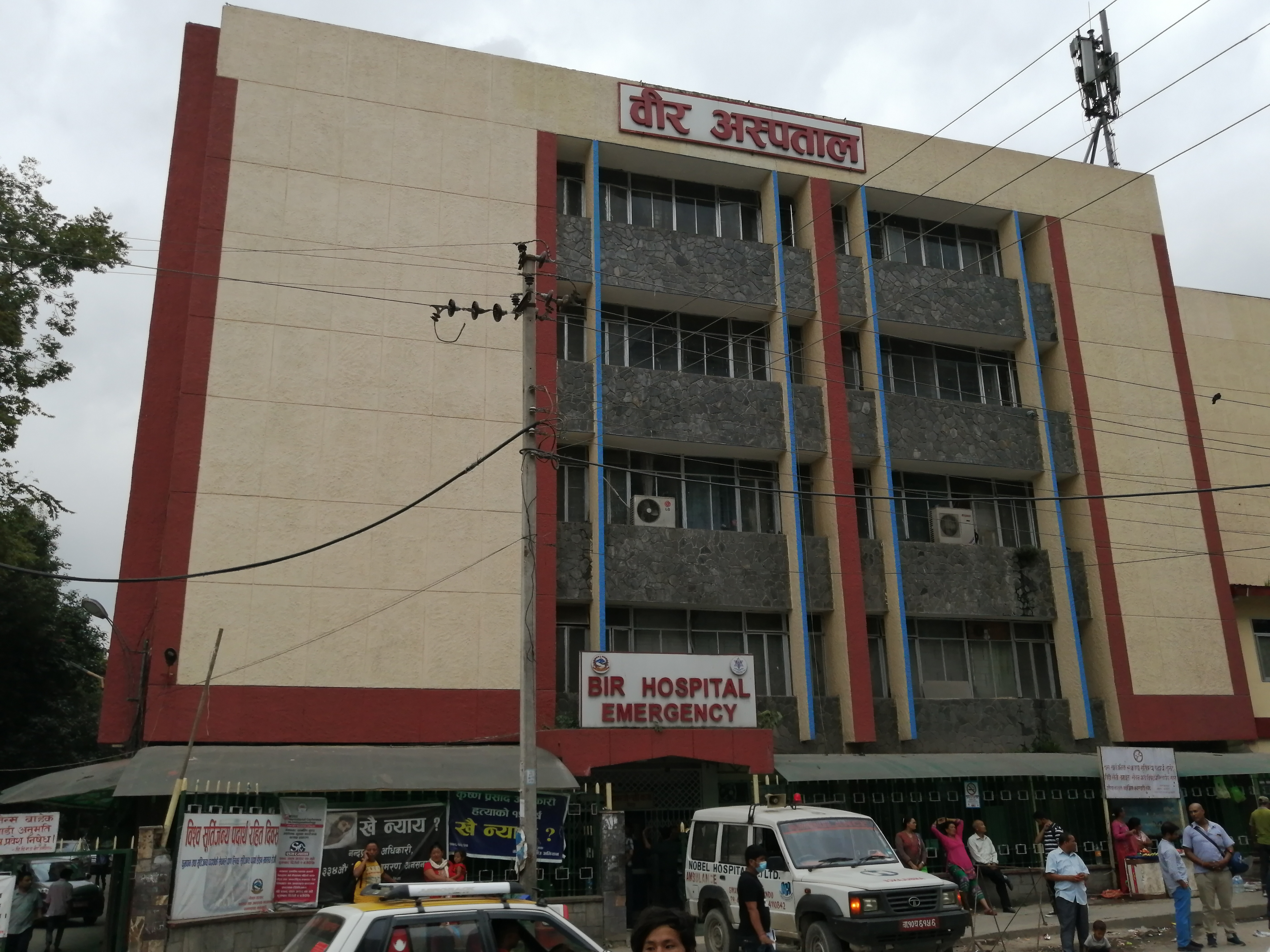

Geography
- Location: Kathmandu, Nepal
- Coordinates: 27.705053°N 85.313608°E

Organisation
- Type: District General, Teaching
- Affiliated university: National Academy of Medical Sciences

Services
- Emergency department: Yes
- Beds: 960 beds

Helipads
- Helipad: No

History
- Founded: 1889; 137 years ago

Links
- Website: Bir Hospital
- Lists: Hospitals in Nepal

Bir Hospital (बीर अस्पताल) is the oldest district general hospital is located in Kathmandu, Nepal. Bir Hospital is one of the busiest hospitals in Nepal. Bir Hospital is the one of teaching hospital by National Academy of Medical Sciences, a government agency since 2003.

The hospital provides medical and surgical treatments. It current has a capacity of 960 beds. It provides some post graduate medical training e.g. general surgery, internal medicine, orthopedic surgery, pathology etc.

Currently Prof. Dr. Dilip Sharma is the executive director of Hospital and has already re-opened its burn service. Hospital has started cath lab services to provide treatment of heart patients.

== History ==
Bir Hospital was established in 1947 B.S (1889AD) by Bir Shumsher Jang Bahadur Rana and was initially called Prithvi Bir Hospital, Prithvi being the name of the then king Prithvi Bir Bikram Shah. It had 30 beds.

An ordinance for the Constitution of a Bir Hospital Development Board was formulated in November of 1957 and was waiting the King's approval.

There were separate medical buildings for men and women. Sometime in 1961, the buildings were reassigned and one became surgical and the other a medical ward. A 250 bed extension was postponed due to scarcity of funds in the same year.

== Infrastructure development ==
Bir Hospital was expanded with a 200-bed Emergency and Trauma Center with funding from the Government of India, foundation stone was laid in June 1997.

== Providers from hospital ==
=== Disaster response ===
The hospital's disaster management plan was used first in 1988 following a stampede incident in the national stadium in Kathmandu.

=== Surgery ===
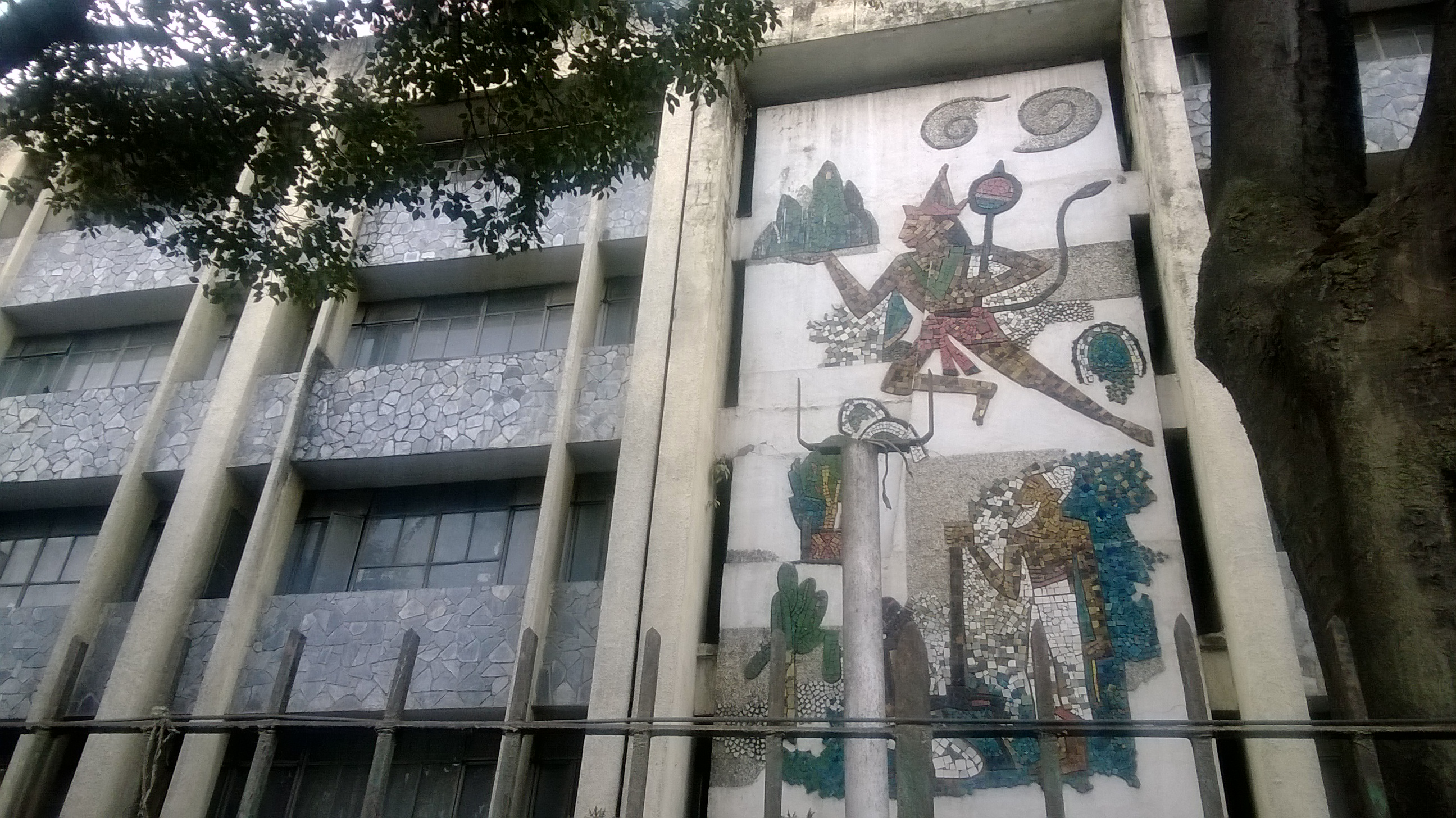
Bir Hospital building in Kathmandu.

The surgery department is the oldest department in the country. It has different units as General Surgery, Gastro and hepatobiliary surgery unit, Burn and Plastic surgery Unit, Urosurgery, Cardiothoracic, and Neurosurgery.

The general surgery department performs about 3,000 elective and emergency operations each year, and similar number of minor general surgical cases. The department needs increase in trained manpower and equipment, as well as refurbishment of the wards and increase in the number of beds as well as operation days.

=== Burn and Plastic Surgery Unit ===
Burn and Plastic surgery unit has 20 beds in Bir Hospital Surgical Building and 15 beds including 5 ICU beds in Burn Unit. Every year more than 100 severely burned patients are admitted in this unit. In the year 2081/82 there were 315 males and 117 females admitted. The unit is currently run by two general surgeons. The WHO Nepal has sponsored a surgeon (Dr. Peeyush Dahal) to have fellowship training in plastic and reconstructive surgery. This unit is also conducting the research in burn care management.

=== Dental department ===
Dental department opened a new orthodontics and dentofacial orthopedics unit in 2009. MDS degrees in prosthodontics and periodontology & oral implantology have also been offered since 2009.

=== MRI Service ===
Bir Hospital has started MRI service from Chaitra 5, 2072 B.S.

== Funding and challenges ==
The yearly budget of NPR 27 Crore (about US$2.371 million), two thirds of which is funded by the government. The hospital has been facing financial difficulties for many years now. The lack of adequate funding, non-functional equipment and inability of the administration to get those running pose significant challenges to the hospital's functioning. Moreover, inappropriate politicization of the administration seems to be the major contributor to the sorry state of affairs at the hospital.

To help in the financing of the hospital expenses, it runs a medical school, which conducts post-graduate medical, surgical and other specialists training and also runs bachelor's level in nursing.

== National Academy of Medical Sciences ==
- National Academy of Medical Sciences (NAMS), Nepal is a premier government-affiliated medical education and health services institution based in Bir Hospital, Mahaboudha, Kathmandu, Nepal. It was established to strengthen postgraduate medical education, specialist training, health services, and medical research in Nepal.

== See also ==
- List of hospitals in Nepal
- Journal of Nepal Medical Association
