= Queen Ratna of Nepal =

Queen of Nepal from 1955 to 1972

Ratna
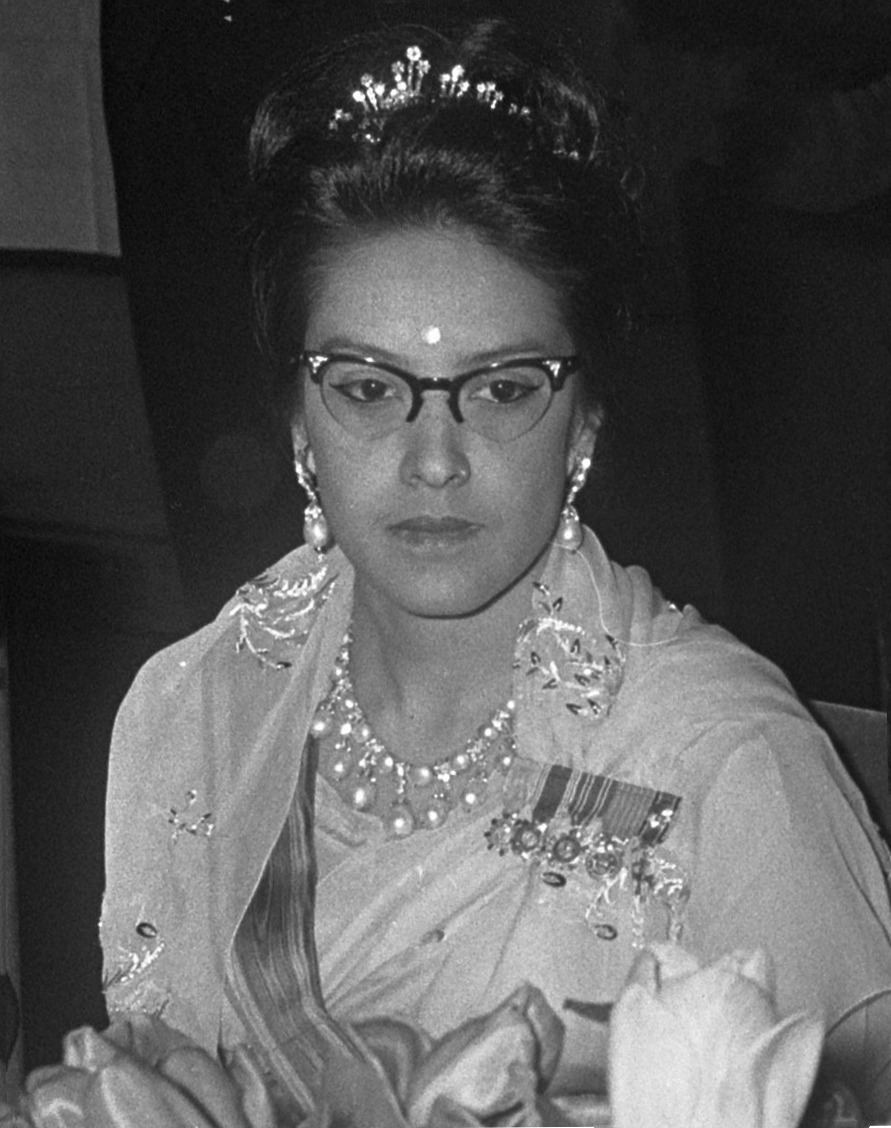
- Queen Ratna in 1967

Queen consort of Nepal
- Tenure: 13 March 1955 – 31 January 1972
- Coronation: 2 May 1956
- Born: 19 August 1928 (age 98); Hari Bhawan, Bagmati, Kathmandu, Nepal
- Spouse: Mahendra Bir Bikram Shah (m. 1952; died 1972)
Names
- Nepali: श्री ५ महारानी रत्न राज्यलक्ष्मी देवी शाह; Shri Panch Maharani Ratna Rajya Lakshmi Devi Shah
- House: Rana dynasty (by birth); Shah dynasty (by marriage)
- Father: Hari Shamsher Jang Bahadur Rana
- Mother: Megha Kumari Rajya Lakshmi
- Religion: Hinduism

Ratna Rajya Lakshmi Devi Shah (born 19 August 1928) is a member of the Nepalese royal family who was the Queen of Nepal from 1955 to 1972 and queen dowager from 1972 to 2008.

== Life ==
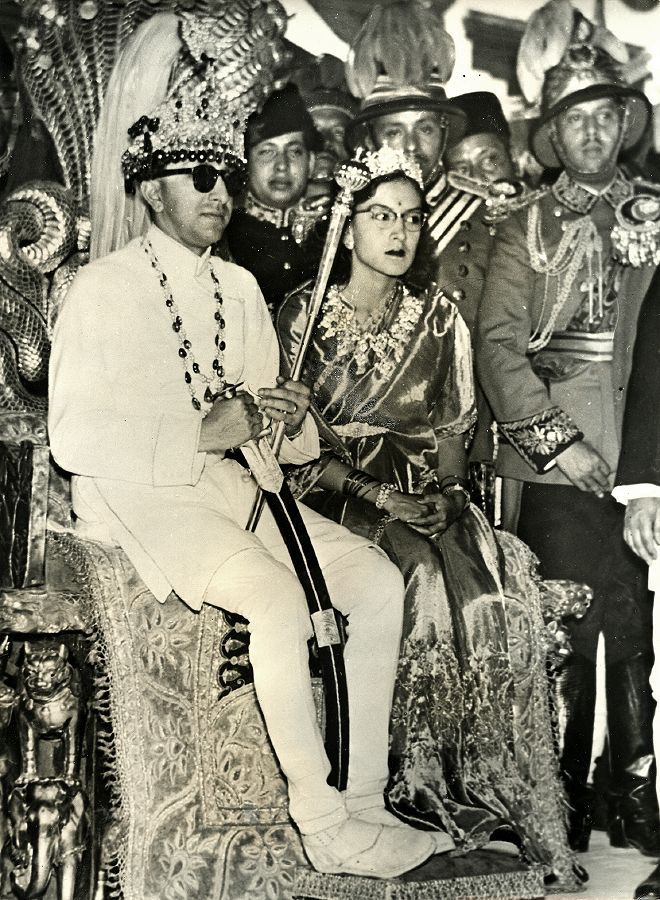
King Mahendra Bir Bikram Shah Dev and Queen Ratna Rajya Lakshmi Devi Shah in their coronation on 2 May 1956.

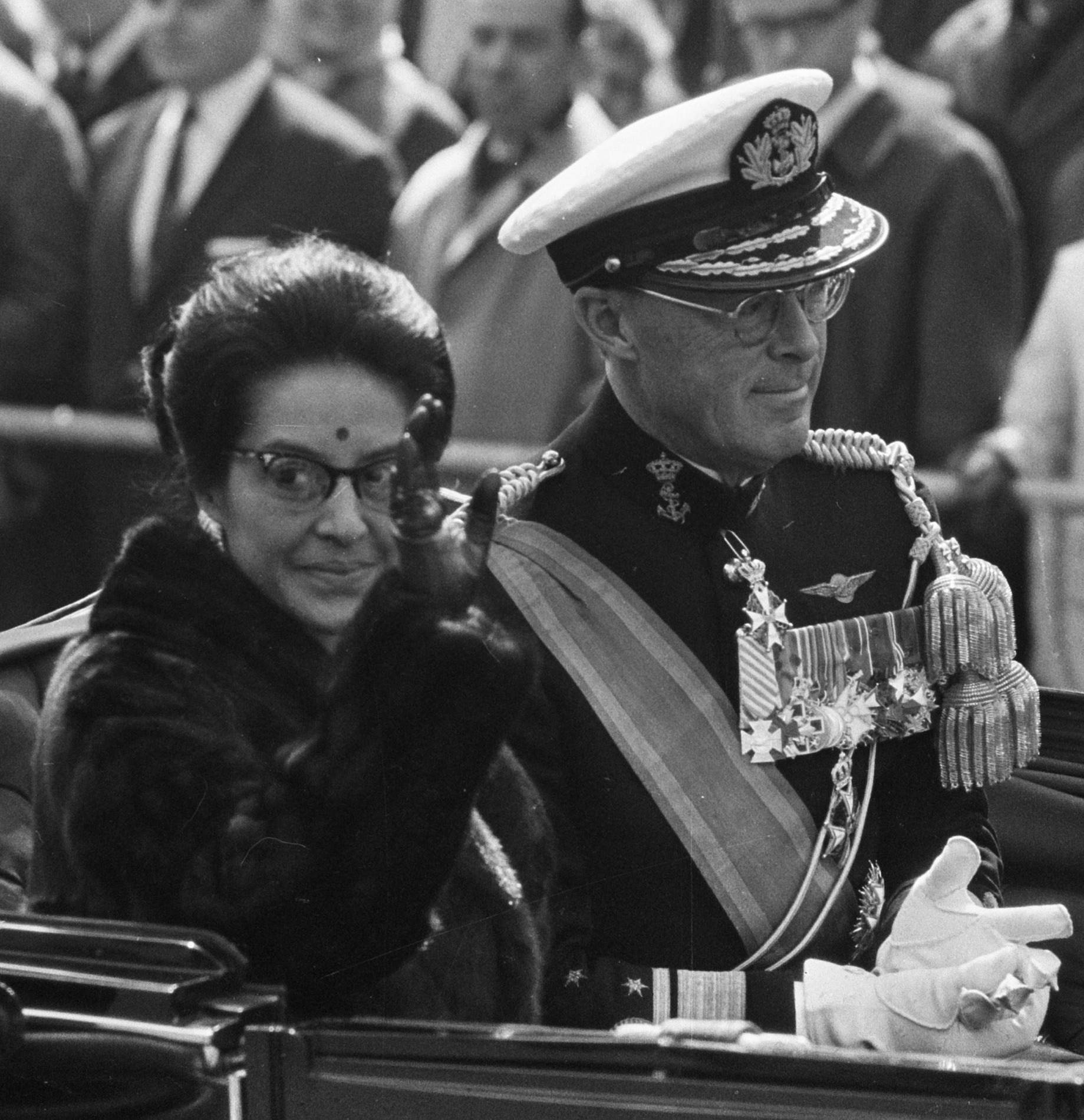
Queen Ratna in the Netherlands on 25 April 1967 with Prince Bernhard.

Ratna's older sister Crown Princess Indra had married Crown Prince Mahendra in 1940 but died in 1950. Two years later, Ratna married Mahendra. Mahendra already had three sons and three daughters with Indra. Ratna became Queen consort after Mahendra's father King Tribhuvan died in 1955. King Mahendra and Queen Ratna did not have any children, as she was sterilized by King Mahendra before their marriage. In 1972, King Mahendra suffered a fatal heart attack while hunting in Chitwan National Park. His oldest son, Crown Prince Birendra took over.

On the evening of June 1, 2001, when the Nepalese royal massacre took place, Ratna was sitting with her sister-in-law Princess Helen Shah in the anteroom, and thus survived. The two women heard the gunshots but did not take them seriously. A few minutes later, Prince Paras came and told them that the Crown Prince Dipendra had shot everybody, including the King. Dipendra was declared King while still in coma, Ratna was said to have refused to see his unconscious body.

The Nepalese monarchy was abolished in 2008 after the Constituent Assembly election. All members of the royal family had to evacuate the Narayanhiti Palace, with the exception of Queen Ratna. King Gyanendra made arrangements for his ailing step-mother and aunt to stay in Mahendra Manzil, a palace within the complex of Narayanhity Palace Museum. The Maoist government, however, confiscated numerous palaces that her husband Mahendra had built on his personal property as gifts to her.

On 24 August 2016, the Nepal Electricity Authority cut off the power supply to the former Queen’s residence, Mahendra Manzil, citing an outstanding electricity bill of Rs. 3.7 million accumulated over the preceding eight years (after the departure of other members of the royal family). According to news reports, Ratna asked her step-son and nephew, former king Gyanendra, not to take up the issue with the government as it would reduce their family dignity, which is what the Maoist government probably wanted. Instead, Ratna asked her step-son to come to her palace with fuel for the diesel generators used as back-up. This whole proceeding resulted in a huge public outcry. Protesters gathered at Ratna Park, a public park Mahendra had built in her honor, and burned an effigy of the new Energy Minister Janardan Sharma of the Maoist Party. Sharma was alleged by the media to have acted in vendetta as he had ignored bills of a hospital associated to him that owed more than Rs.10 million. Due to public backlash, the government was forced to restore the power to the Mahendra Manzil Palace after 20 hours.

On 5 March 2019, Ratna was hospitalized in the Norvic Hospital due to a week-long persistent cough and flu. An elite team of five doctors attended to her, and she was visited by her son Gyanendra and daughter in-law Queen Komal with homemade food. On 1 September 2022 she underwent cataract surgery at Sudrishti Eye Clinic at Durbarmarg.

== Honors ==
Many structures, institutions, locations and honors have been built and introduced in the respect of Queen Ratna. Monuments erected in her name were renamed after the restoration of the parliament and the end of the monarchy in 2008. Even though the Ratna Park named after the queen was renamed as Shankhadhar Sakhwa Park, Ratna Park is still popular among the people.

1. Ratna Park
2. Ratna Highway
3. Queen of Nepal: a Russian folk song
4. Tsaritsa Nepala (Queen of Nepal): a Russian song about Nepal and the queen
5. Ratna Statue in Ratna Park
6. Ratna Rajya Laxmi Campus

== Honours ==
=== National honours ===
  - Nepal Decoration of Honour (25 December 1966).
  - Order of the Benevolent Ruler, 1st class (1964).
  - Tribhuvan Order of the Footprint of Democracy, 1st class (2 May 1956).
  - Order of the Footprint of Nepal, 1st class (16 December 1962).
  - Order of the Rama Mantra Power, 1st class.
  - Ati Suvikhyata Sewalankar [Renowned Service Medal].
  - King Mahendra Investiture Medal (2 May 1956).
  - King Birendra Investiture Medal (24 February 1975).
  - Commemorative Silver Jubilee Medal of King Birendra (31 January 1997).
  - King Gyanendra Investiture Medal (4 June 2001).

=== Foreign honours ===
- Japan:
  - Paulwonia Dame Grand Cordon of the Order of the Precious Crown
- Germany:
  - Grand Cross Special Issue of the Order of Merit of the Federal Republic of Germany
- Netherlands:
  - Dame Grand Cross of the Order of the Netherlands Lion (25 April 1967).
- Laos:
  - Dame Grand Cross of the Order of the Million Elephants and the White Parasol (1970).
- Pakistan:
  - Order of Excellence 1st Class (1970).
- Philippines:
  - Golden Heart Medal 1st Class (1971).
- Pahlavi dynasty:
  - Commemorative Medal of the 2500th Anniversary of the founding of the Persian Empire (14 October 1971).

== See also ==
- Ratna Rajya Lakshmi Campus
- Ratna Park

Royal titles
Preceded by Kanti	Queen consort of Nepal; 1955–1972	Succeeded by Aishwarya
