= Karki interim cabinet =

Interim cabinet of Government of Nepal (2025–2026)

Sushila Karki interim cabinet
- Interim Council of Ministers of Nepal
- People and organisations
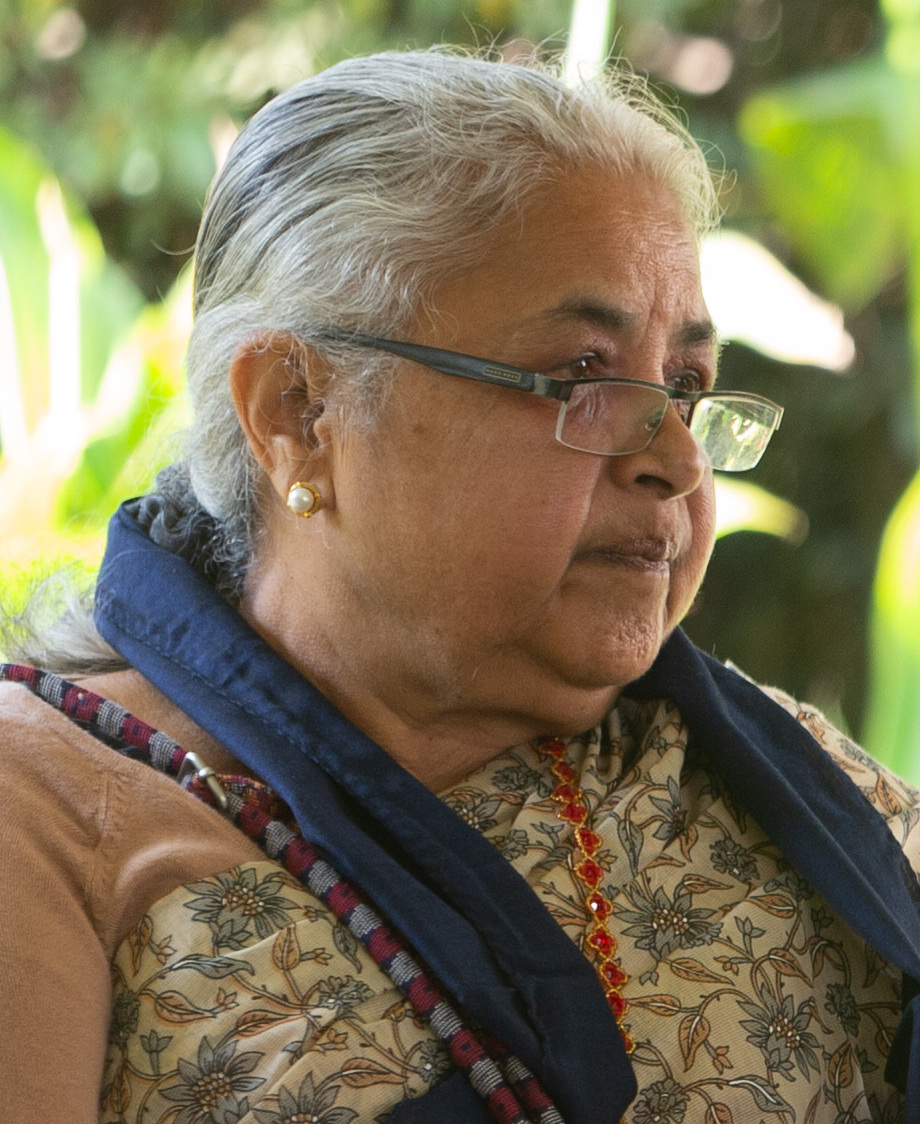
- Date formed: 12 September 2025
- Date dissolved: 27 March 2026

People and organisations
- President: Ram Chandra Poudel
- Prime Minister: Sushila Karki
- Prime Minister's history: Chief Justice of Nepal (2016–2017); Justice of the Supreme Court of Nepal (2009–2016)
- No. of ministers: 11 (incl. Prime Minister)
- Member party: Independent
- Status in legislature: Dissolved

History
- Incoming formation: 2025 protests
- Election: –
- Outgoing election: March 2026
- Predecessor: Fourth Oli cabinet
- Successor: Balen Shah cabinet

An interim government was formed in Nepal on 12 September 2025 after the Generation Z-led mass anti-corruption protests that overthrew the government of the prime minister, K. P. Sharma Oli. With the dissolution of the second federal parliament on 12 September 2025, the cabinet led by interim Prime Minister Sushila Karki remained in office until the formation of new government under Balendra Shah on 27th March 2026 after the 2026 general election.

== Appointment ==
Sushila Karki was chosen as interim Prime Minister based on discussions between various government stakeholders and Gen Z representatives. This decision was taken with support from an online vote conducted by protesters via a poll on Discord. The first woman to serve as Chief Justice of the Supreme Court of Nepal, Karki is also the country's first female head of government, her appointment agreed upon during talks with the Nepali Army.

| Candidate | Votes | % |
|---|---|---|
| Sushila Karki | 3,833 | 49.70 |
| Rastra Bimochan Timalsena | 2,022 | 26.22 |
| Sagar Dhakal | 1,098 | 14.24 |
| Harka Sampang | 487 | 6.31 |
| Mahabir Pun | 273 | 3.54 |
| Total | 7,713 | 100.00 |
Source: ClickMandu, Al Jazeera.

== Arrangement ==
| S.N. | Portfolio | Minister | Background | Assumed office | Left office |
|---|---|---|---|---|---|
Prime Minister
| 1 | Interim Prime Minister^{All other portfolios not allocated to any Minister} | Sushila Karki | Former Chief Justice of Nepal | 12 September 2025 | 27 March 2026 |
Cabinet Ministers
| 2 | Minister for Finance | Rameshwar Khanal | Former Finance Secretary | 15 September 2025 | 27 March 2026 |
| 2 | Minister for Federal Affairs and General Administration | Rameshwar Khanal | Former Finance Secretary | 22 September 2025 | 27 March 2026 |
| 3 | Minister for Energy, Water Resources and Irrigation | Kul Man Ghising | Former head of the NEA | 15 September 2025 | 7 January 2026 |
| 3 | Minister for Urban Development | Kul Man Ghising | Former head of the NEA | 15 September 2025 | 7 January 2026 |
| 3 | Minister for Physical Infrastructure and Transport | Kul Man Ghising | Former head of the NEA | 15 September 2025 | 7 January 2026 |
| 4 | Minister for Home Affairs | Om Prakash Aryal | Supreme Court Advocate | 15 September 2025 | 26 March 2026 |
| 5 | Minister for Industry, Commerce and Supplies | Anil Kumar Sinha | Former Supreme Court Justice | 22 September 2025 | 27 March 2026 |
| 5 | Minister for Law, Justice and Parliamentary Affairs | Anil Kumar Sinha | Former Supreme Court Justice | 22 September 2025 | 27 March 2026 |
| 5 | Minister for Land Management, Cooperatives and Poverty Alleviation | Anil Kumar Sinha | Former Supreme Court Justice | 22 September 2025 | 12 December 2025 |
| 5 | Minister for Culture, Tourism and Civil Aviation | Anil Kumar Sinha | Former Supreme Court Justice | 12 December 2025 | 27 March 2026 |
| 6 | Minister for Land Management, Cooperatives and Poverty Alleviation | Kumar Ingnam | Law Expert | 12 December 2025 | 27 March 2026 |
| 7 | Minister for Education, Science and Technology | Mahabir Pun | Founder of National Innovation Center | 22 September 2025 | 20 January 2026 |
| 8 | Minister for Agriculture and Livestock Development | Madan Prasad Pariyar | Climate & agriculture expert, president of Samata Foundation | 22 September 2025 | 27 March 2026 |
| 9 | Minister for Communications and Information Technology | Jagdish Kharel | Journalist and media-professional (Image Media Group) | 22 September 2025 | 19 January 2026 |
| 10 | Minister of Health and Population | Sudha Sharma Gautam | Former Secretary of Ministry of Health and Population, Served as President of the Nepal Medical Association, President the South Asian Federation of Obstetrics and Gynecology | 26 October 2025 | 27 March 2026 |
| 11 | Minister of Youth and Sports | Bablu Gupta | Gen Z activist | 26 October 2025 | 19 January 2026 |
| 12 | Minister of Labour, Employment and Social Security | Rajendra Singh Bhandari | Founding Chief of CIB | 12 December 2025 | 27 March 2026 |
| 12 | Minister of Water Supply | Rajendra Singh Bhandari | Founding Chief of CIB | 19 December 2025 | 27 March 2026 |
| 13 | Minister for Physical Infrastructure and Transport | Madhav Chaulagain | Public Health Expert | 9 January 2026 | 27 March 2026 |
| 13 | Minister of Forests and Environment | Madhav Chaulagain | Public Health Expert | 12 December 2025 | 27 March 2026 |
| 14 | Minister of Women, Children and Senior Citizens | Shraddha Shrestha | Tourism Activist | 12 December 2025 | 27 March 2026 |
| 15 | Minister of Foreign Affairs | Bala Nanda Sharma | Lt. General, Retired | 26 December 2025 | 27 March 2026 |

== See also ==
- Council of Ministers of Nepal
- Government of Nepal
