= Ministry of Education and Sports (Nepal) =

Federal ministry of Nepal

- शिक्षा तथा खेलकुद मन्त्रालय
- Emblem of Nepal

Ministry overview
- Formed: 13 May 2026; 3 months ago
- Preceding agencies: Ministry of Education, Science and Technology; Ministry of Youth and Sports
- Jurisdiction: Government of Nepal
- Headquarters: Singha Durbar, Kathmandu
- Minister responsible: Sasmit Pokharel, Cabinet Minister
- Website: Ministry of Education and Sports

The Ministry of Education and Sports (Nepali: शिक्षा तथा खेलकुद मन्त्रालय) is a federal ministry of Nepal established on 13 May 2026. It was formed by the merger of Education portfolio of the former Ministry of Education, Science and Technology and Sports portfolio of the dissolved Ministry of Youth and Sports.

This ministry was formed as a part of administrative restructuring by Balendra Shah-led government under Nepal Government (Work Division) Regulations, 2083. This ministry is responsible for the oversight of national education system and the development of sports.

== List of ministers ==
This is a list of all ministers of Education since the Nepalese Constituent Assembly election in 2013:

SN	Name	Party	Assumed office	Left office
Ministry of Education (2013-2018)
1	Chitra Lekha Yadav	Nepali Congress	25 February 2014	
2	Giriraj Mani Pokharel	Communist Party of Nepal (Maoist Centre)	19 October 2015	
3	Dhaniram Paudel	Communist Party of Nepal (Maoist Centre)	14 August 2016	31 May 2017
4	Gopal Man Shrestha	Nepal Loktantrik Forum	7 June 2017	15 February 2018
Ministry of Education, Science and Technology (2018-2026)
5	Giriraj Mani Pokharel	Communist Party of Nepal (Maoist Centre)	16 March 2018	20 December 2020
6	Krishna Gopal Shrestha	CPN UML	25 December 2020	13 July 2021
7	Devendra Paudel	Communist Party of Nepal (Maoist Centre)	8 October 2021	26 December 2022
8	Shishir Khanal	Rastriya Swatantra Party	17 January 2023	5 February 2023
9	Ashok Rai	People's Socialist Party, Nepal	31 March 2023	4 March 2024
10	Sumana Shrestha	Rastriya Swatantra Party	6 March 2024	15 July 2024
11	Bidya Bhattarai	CPN UML	15 July 2024	22 April 2025
12	Raghuji Pant	CPN UML	24 April 2025	9 September 2025
13	Sushila Karki	Independent	12 September 2025	22 September 2025
14	Mahabir Pun	Independent	22 September 2025	20 January 2026
15	Sasmit Pokharel	RSP	27 March 2026	14 May 2026
Ministry of Education and Sports (2026)
-	Sasmit Pokharel	RSP	14 May 2026	Incumbent
