= Minister of Science, Technology and Innovation (Nepal) =

Head of the Ministry of Science, Technology and Innovation of Nepal

Minister of Science, Technology and Innovation of Government of Nepal
- विज्ञान, प्रविधि तथा नवप्रवर्तन मन्त्री
- Emblem of Nepal

- Flag of Nepal

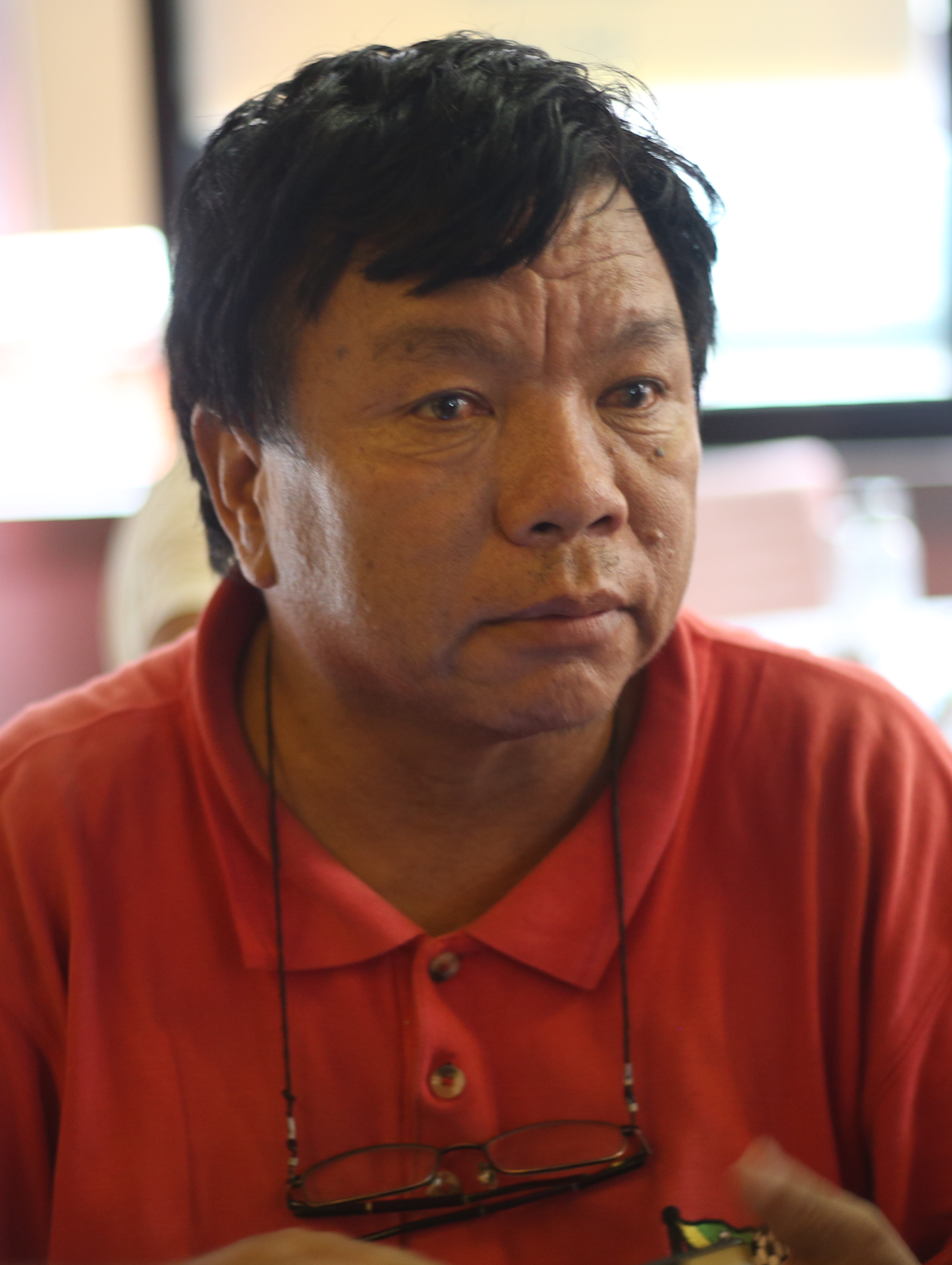
- Incumbent; Mahabir Pun since 9 June 2026
- Ministry of Science, Technology and Innovation
- Member of: Council of Ministers of Nepal
- Reports to: Prime Minister
- Appointer: President of Nepal
- Formation: 13 May 2026
- First holder: Mahabir Pun
- Website: https://mosti.gov.np

The Minister of Science, Technology and Innovation (विज्ञान, प्रविधि तथा नवप्रवर्तन मन्त्री) is the political head of the Ministry of Science, Technology and Innovation of the Government of Nepal.

The minister is responsible for formulating and implementing national policies related to scientific research, emerging technologies, innovation ecosystems, technology transfer, digital transformation, nuclear technology regulation, and scientific capacity development in Nepal.

The position is intended to strengthen coordination between government agencies, universities, research institutions, private industries, and technology-based enterprises to promote a knowledge-based economy.

== History ==
The Ministry of Science, Technology and Innovation was established to provide a dedicated institutional framework for science, technology, research, and innovation governance in Nepal.

Before the creation of the ministry, science and technology-related responsibilities were distributed among different government bodies, including ministries responsible for education.

The creation of a dedicated ministry aimed to improve policy coordination, increase investment in research and development, and support innovation-driven economic growth.

== Responsibilities ==
Ministry of Science, Technology and Innovation oversees national policy and government programmes related to:

- Scientific research and development
- Technology innovation and commercialization
- Research institutions and laboratories
- Digital transformation initiatives
- Artificial intelligence and emerging technologies
- Biotechnology and life sciences
- Space science and satellite-related programmes
- Nuclear technology regulation and safety oversight
- Technology entrepreneurship and startup ecosystems
- Intellectual property and knowledge transfer
- Science education and public awareness

== Agencies and Institutions under the Ministry ==
The ministry may coordinate with or supervise institutions including:

- Nepal Academy of Science and Technology
- National research laboratories
- Technology innovation centres
- Scientific regulatory bodies
- Government research programmes

== List of ministers of science, technology and innovation ==
No.	Name	Term of office		Prime Minister	Political party
1	Mahabir Pun	9 June 2026	Incumbent	Balendra Shah	Independent

== Powers and constitutional position ==
The minister is a member of the Council of Ministers of Nepal and exercises executive authority over the ministry according to Nepal's constitutional and legal framework.

The minister works under the leadership of the Prime Minister of Nepal and is appointed by the President of Nepal on the recommendation of the prime minister.

== See also ==
- Government of Nepal
- Ministry of Education and Sports (Nepal)
- Nepal Academy of Science and Technology
