= Education in Nepal =

Ministry of Education
- Minister of Education: Sasmit Pokharel

National education budget (2022)
- Budget: $122.78 million

General details
- Primary languages: Nepalese
- System type: Federal, province and private

Literacy (2021)
- Total: 76.3%
- Male: 83.6%
- Female: 69.4%

Enrollment
- Total: 6,373,003
- Primary: 4,030,045
- Secondary: 2,195,835 (Note: Includes lower secondary, secondary, and higher secondary)
- Post secondary: 147,123

Attainment
- Secondary diploma: 46.2%
- Post-secondary diploma: Unavailable

Education in Nepal has been modeled on the Indian system, which is in turn based on that of the old British Raj. The National Examinations Board supervises all standardized tests, while the Ministry of Education and Sports is responsible for managing educational activities in Nepal. The National Center for Educational Development is Nepal's teacher-training body.

In 2021, Nepal's literacy rate was 76.3% (83.6% for males and 69.4% for females). The April 2015 Nepal earthquake destroyed schools and severely impacted the nation's ability to keep its remaining schools open.

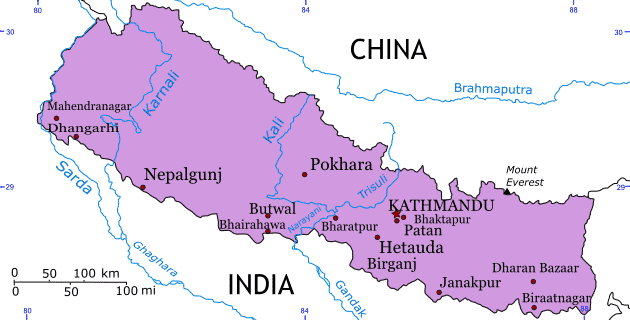
Nepal's location relative to its neighbors, China and India

== History ==
From its inception, education in Nepal was modeled on the Indian system, which had evolved from the old British Raj. Nepal's education system was historically based on home-schooling and gurukulas, was similar to the former Indian system in which pupils would learn either in their own homes or with priests or Gurus. Before Nepal was declared a democratic country, the general public had no access to formal education. Nepal's first formal school, Durbar High School, was established in 1854 and intended for only the elite. The birth of Nepalese democracy in 1951 opened its classrooms to a more diverse population.

In 1971, Nepal's national government nationalized schooling, although it reversed this in 1980. It subsequently legalized for-profit schools.

During the 1990s and early 21st century, the influence of private schools in Nepal grew significantly. In 2011, the Nepalese government passed a law imposing a 5% tax on private schools. However, the Private and Boarding Schools’ Organisation Nepal, an organization representing private schools, successfully protested the law, leading to its repeal. The organisation also successfully protested a 2012 ruling by the Supreme Court of Nepal ordering a three-year moratorium on tuition increases. Nepal's national government has attempted to introduce tuition-free and compulsory education on multiple occasions during the early 21st century.

As of 2010, there were approximately 49,000 schools in Nepal, and, as of 2025, 301,000 teachers. In 2001, Nepal's literacy rate was 48.6% (62.7% for males and 32.9% for females), which increased in 2021 to 71.2% (81% for males and 63.3% for females). As of 2018, slightly more than 18% of schools in Nepal are privately owned.

== Structure ==
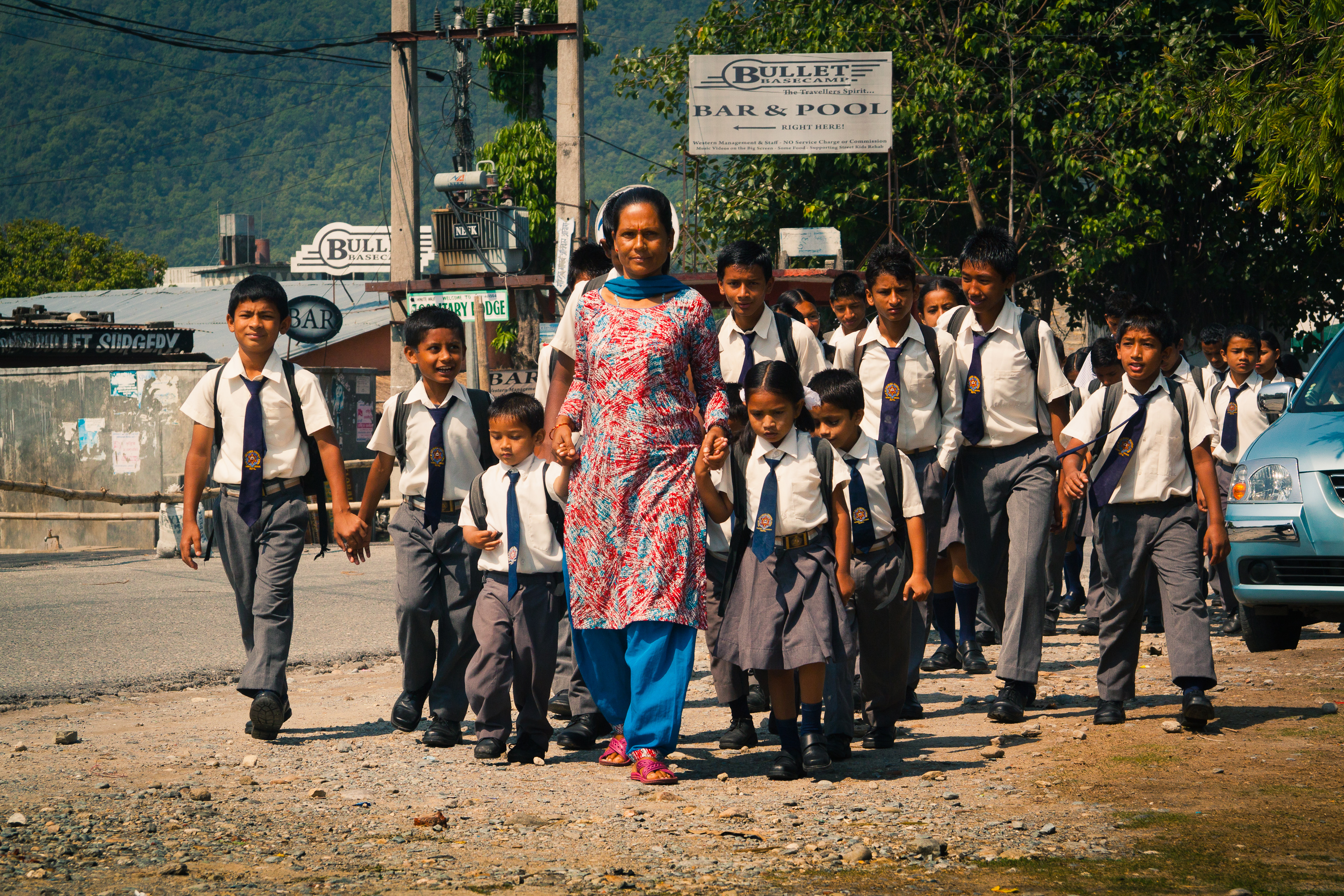
Teacher and schoolchildren in Pokhara

Primary education in Nepal consists of grades one through eight, while secondary levels are grades nine to twelve. Pre-primary education is available in some areas, and students usually begin grade one at age five. A Basic Level Examination (BLE) is given in grade eight while a national Secondary Education Exam (SEE), previously known as a School Leaving Certificate (SLC), is conducted at the end of grade 10. The School Leaver's Certificate is given at the completion of the Grade 12 examination. The National Examinations Board supervises all BLE, SEE and 12th grade exams.

Depending upon the educational stream and degree subject, a bachelor's degree typically requires four years of study. Universities in Nepal offer post-graduate education and PhD degrees in various fields .

Vocational education begins after basic level education, and students can follow a two-year curriculum leading to a Technical School Leaving Certificate. In addition to the formal track, one-year programs focusing on skill development are also available.

== Access to education ==
The Human Rights Measurement Initiative (HRMI) finds that Nepal is fulfilling only 83.5% of what it should for the right to education based on its level of income. Taking Nepal's income level into consideration, the nation is achieving 95.4% of what should be possible for primary education but only 71.5% for secondary education.

=== Effect of crisis ===
Although the Jhapa District had a 99.33% literacy rate in 2014, many children in remote villages do not have access to education past the primary level. Students often leave primary schools after they learn to read and write, but without any additional education. The April 2015 earthquake destroyed schools and severely impacted the nation's ability to keep its remaining schools open.

== Administration ==
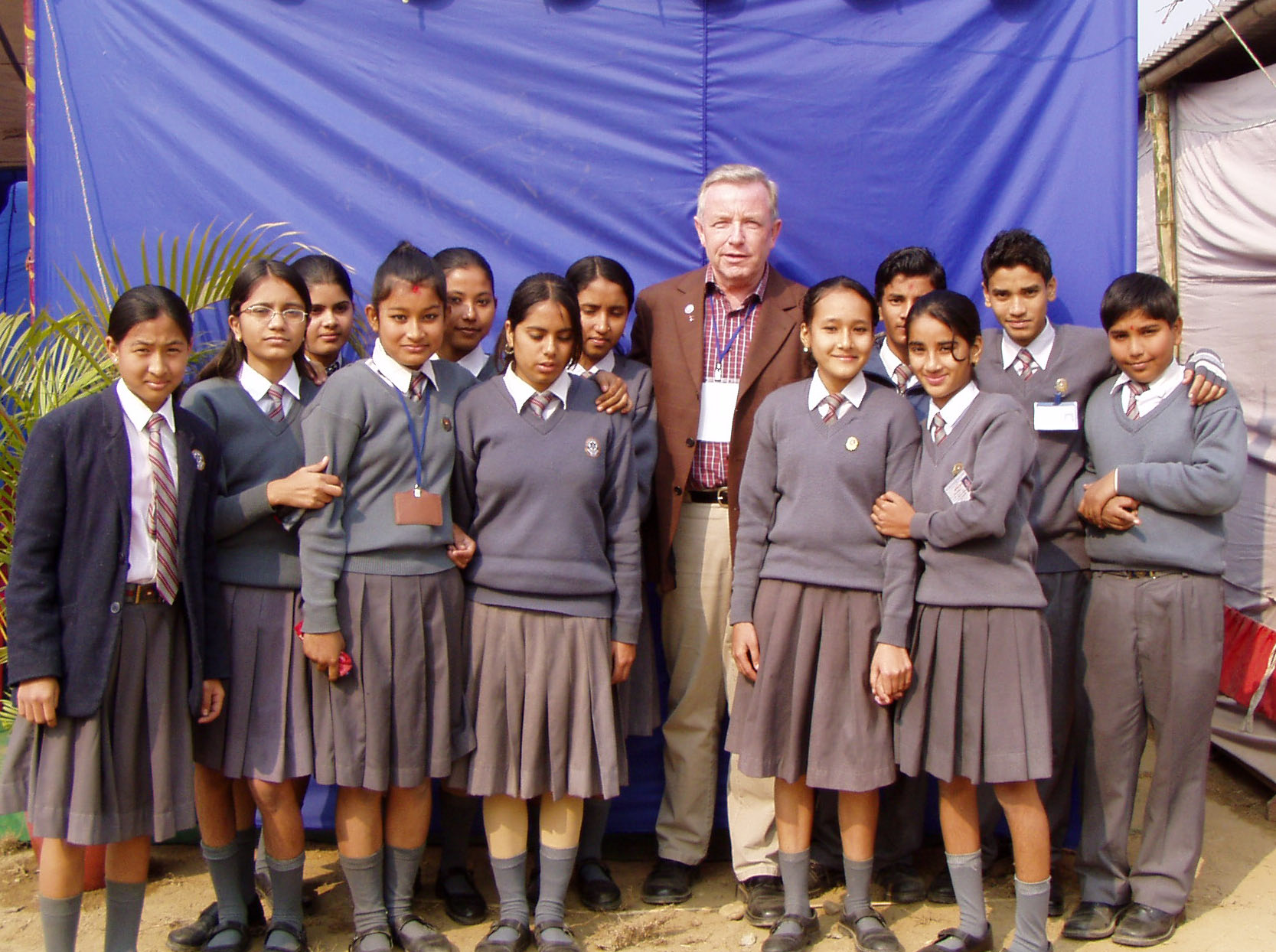
Schoolchildren in Kathmandu

The Ministry of Education and Sports, led by the Minister, is responsible for managing educational activities in Nepal. The ministry, as a part of the government, is headed by the Secretary of Education and consists of a central national office responsible for policy development, planning, monitoring, and evaluation as well as other offices at the regional and district levels.

The National Center for Educational Development is Nepal's teacher-training body. It has 34 educational training centers to provide pedagogical support for teachers.

Nepal has two primary types of schools: community, which are public and receive government grants, and institutional, private, self-funded schools that are also non-profit trusts or companies.

== Tertiary education ==
=== Universities ===
Nepal's first college was Tri-Chandra College, founded in 1918, and until 1985, Tribhuvan University was the country's only university.

As of 2026, Nepal has 22 operational universities, consisting of 16 federal universities and 6 provincial universities.

=== Medical colleges ===
Medical education in Nepal is regulated by the Medical Council of Nepal. To be eligible for admission to MBBS courses in Nepalese medical colleges, students must pass the higher secondary examination in science.

Medical education in Nepal is highly controversial as many qualified students are turned away in lieu of competitive marks. Corruption is rampant with schools accepting students based on connections to established figures or illicit donations, and the "hidden" tuition, as it's referred, is the additional cost of bribing officials in the education and health ministry with some students paying triple the tuition fees for enrollment.

=== Engineering colleges ===
Engineering colleges also exist throughout Nepal, with most admitting local students through an entrance exam and foreign students after an interview.

Nepal's oldest engineering school is Tribhuvan University's Institute of Engineering, while Nepal's first private engineering college to offer bachelor's- and master's-level courses is the Engineering College in Changunarayan.

=== Study abroad ===
Nepal ranks 11th in countries of origin for international students in the United States. According to "Open Doors 2009", an annual report on international academic mobility published by the Institute of International Education, the number of Nepali students enrolled in U.S. institutions of higher education increased by 29.6 percent from 8,936 in the 2007–08 academic year to 11,581 in 2008–09. In the 2006–07 academic year, Nepal ranked 13th among countries of origin of international students.

The United States is the preferred destination for Nepalese students wishing to study abroad because of the quality and prestige associated with an American degree as well as access to comprehensive, accurate information about study in the U.S. through EducationUSA offices in Nepal and increased efforts by American colleges and universities to attract Nepalese students. However, "a culture of disrespect" by U.S. Embassy staff has been reported.

According to the Australian Department of Education, there are currently more than 53,170 Nepalese students studying in Australia in 2023, placing Nepal as its third-largest source of international students, following China and India.

== Issues ==
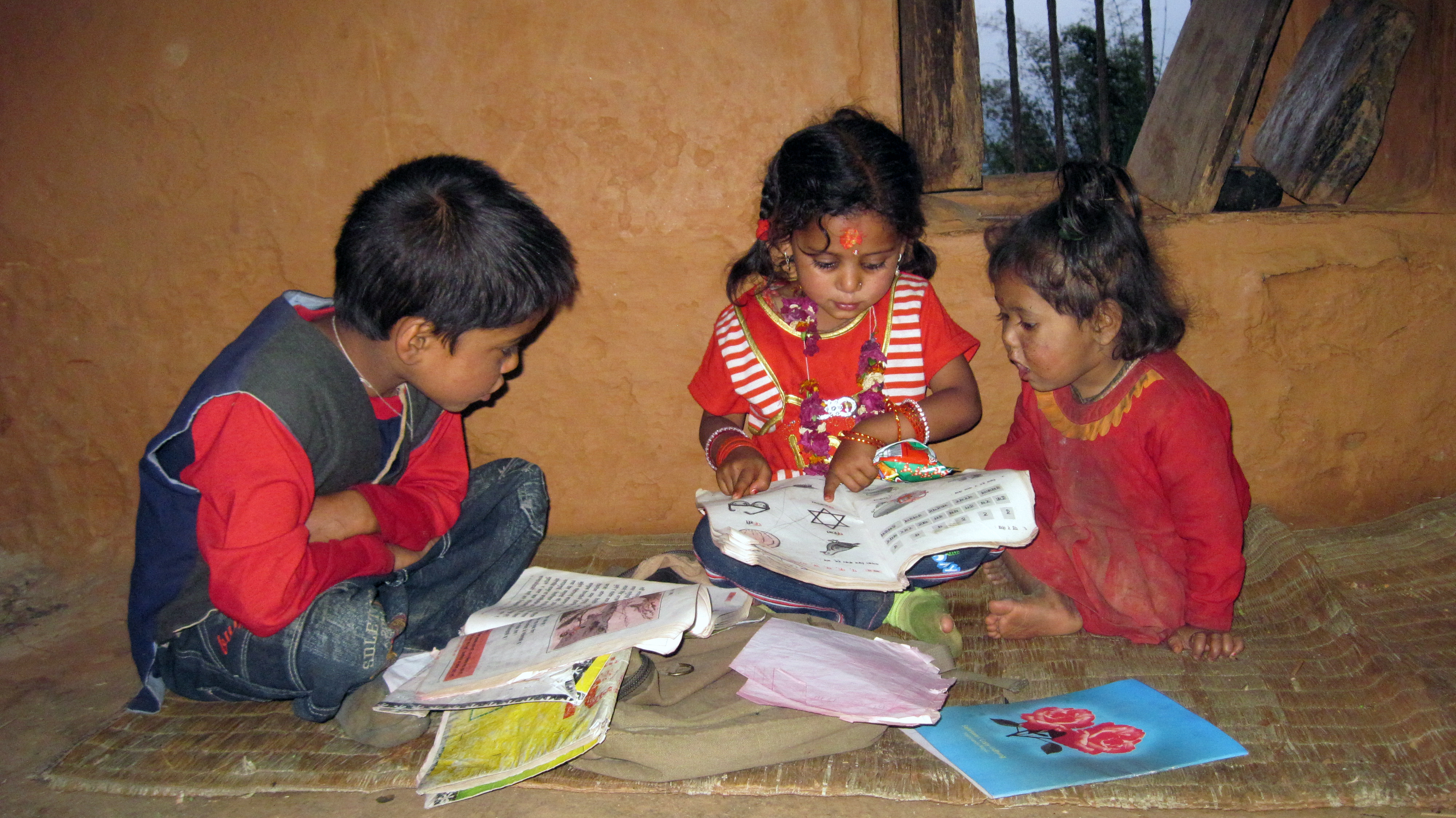
Nepalese children at home using second-hand textbooks

Public schools in Nepal suffer from poor infrastructure, low-quality teachers, political inference in teacher appointments, and weak management and regulation. Public school students in Nepal have historically under performed compared to their private school peers on the country's School Leaving Certificate, a major secondary school exam. Nepal's efforts to reform public education have failed on numerous occasions. In 2025, public school teachers went on a nationwide strike in response to a proposed education reform bill in parliament.

Private schools in Nepal face little regulation and have historically ignored government laws and court rulings unfavorable to them. They also hold considerable influence in national politics, as elected lawmakers are often involved in owning or running them.

== See also ==
- List of schools in Nepal
- List of universities and colleges in Nepal
- Gender inequality in Nepal
- Human rights in Nepal
