= National Integrated College =

College in Kathmandu

- Type: Private, Non-profit
- Established: 2001
- Affiliations: Higher Secondary Education Board, Tribhuvan University
- Principal: Indra Bahadur Malla
- Location: Kathmandu, Nepal; 27.706629°N 85.325617°E
- Website: www.nic.edu.np

The National Integrated College (NIC) is a private higher secondary institution in Kathmandu, Nepal.

The school educates at Grades 11 and 12 level for which it is affiliated with the Higher Secondary Education Board. It also provides bachelor's degree courses for which it is affiliated with the Tribhuvan University.
