= Academic grading in Nepal =

In Nepal, the grade system is divided into different ways.

New SLC grading system of Nepal to be implemented from the SLC Examination of 2072 BS (2015/2016).
Percentage obtained	Grade	Grade description	Grade point
>= 90%	A+	Outstanding	4
>=80% AND <90%	A	Excellent	3.6
>=70% AND <80%	B+	Very Good	3.2
>=60% AND <70%	B	Good	2.8
>=50% AND <60%	C+	Above Average	2.4
>=40% AND <50%	C	Average	2.0
>=35% AND <40%	D	Below Average	1.6
<35%	NG	Non Graded	-

The above grading system refers to the Secondary Education Examination (SEE) previously called School leaving Certificate (SLC) examinations when it was implemented, held at the end of at grade 10. It is administered by the Department of Education under the Ministry of Education and Sports, Nepal. Different grading systems are currently being implemented by different universities and education boards.

== See also ==
- Secondary Education Examination (Nepal)
- School Leaving Certificate (Nepal)
