= National Infotech College =

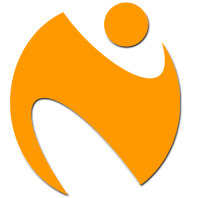
Logo of National Infotech College

National Infotech College is a college in Birgunj, Nepal, focused on science and technology. Its programs include its +2 Science Program, its Bachelor of Computer Application program, and its B.Sc. program in Computer Science and IT. The Principal of the college is Er. Manish Singh. The chairman of the college is Mr. Arjun Prasad Singh. The college is affiliated with Nepal's National Examinations Board and Tribhuvan University.
