= Gita Shahi =

Nepalese actress and model (born 1984)

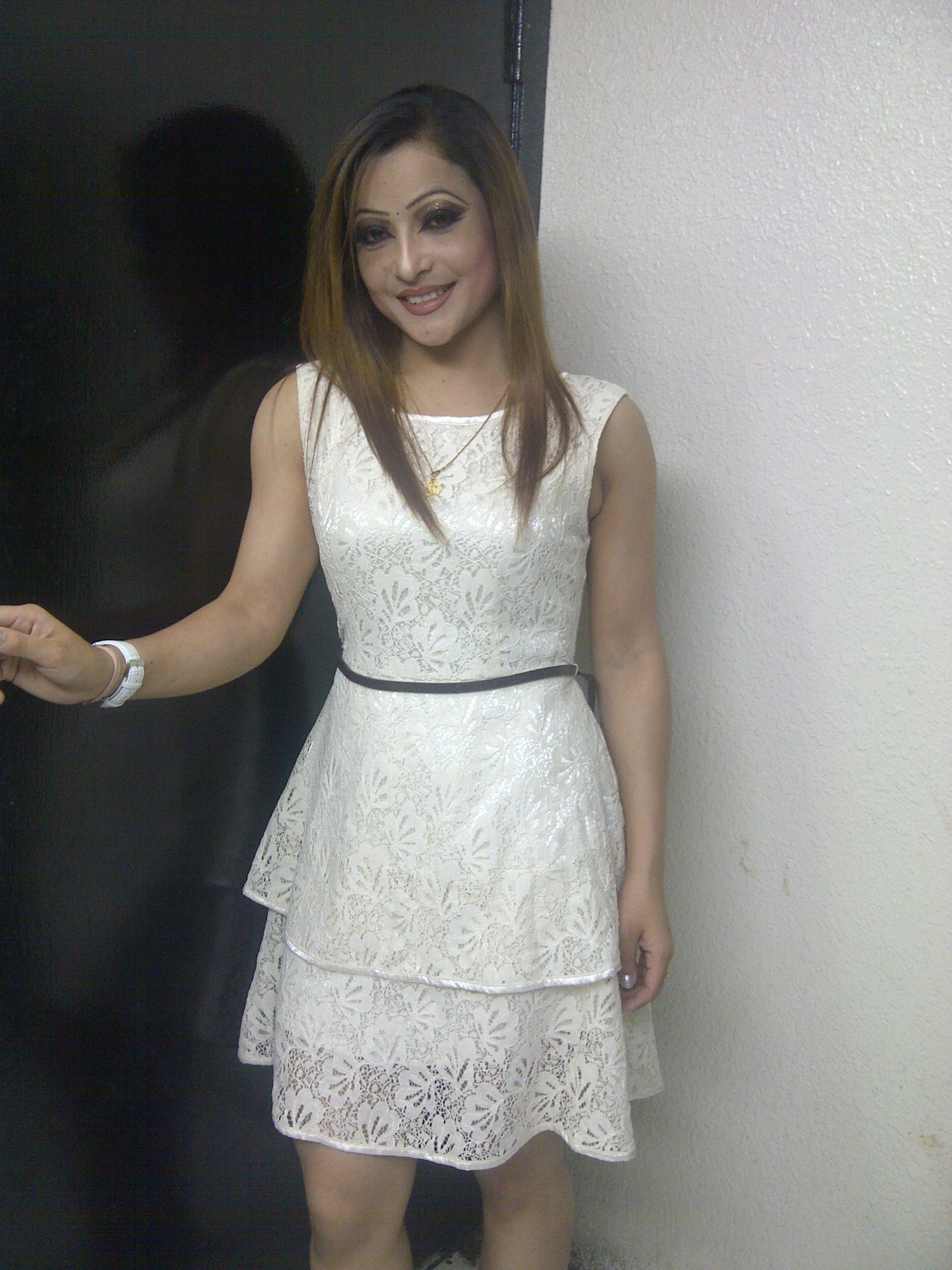
- Born: February 3, 1984 (age 42); Bhaktapur, Nepal
- Citizenship: Nepal
- Occupations: Actress, model, television personality, dancer
- Years active: 2002–present
- Television: MOD, Aparajita, Paath Brastha, Sanka, Prasuna, Prarambha, Sangeet Sandhya, Rajatpat, Thorai Bhaye Pugi Sari
- Awards: Best Newcomer Female Actress, Nepal (2005) Miss Photogenic, Mr. and Ms. Bhaktapur, Nepal (2002)

Gita Shahi (Nepali: गीता शाही; born February 3, 1984) is a Nepalese actress and model. Shahi is best known for her rise as Best Newcomer Actress from Nepalese Movie Bandhaki in 2005 and for her role on the television series Mod, Aparajita, Path Vrasta and Thorai Bhaye Pugi Sari. Shahi has worked in several movies such as Jungali Maya, Pandav, Kheladi, Jungali Manchey, Naina Reshnam and Newari movies like Nipho Swan, Maya Re Ratna and Matina.

Shahi has been doing modeling in several music videos, commercials, publications and fashion shows. She is an activist for the public health movement and has conducted Radio drama such as Jana Swasthya Karyakram (Public health program) from Nepalese National Radio Channel, Radio Nepal and played lead role as an actress in Thorai Bhaye Pugi Sari and Sanka, both being TV awareness series of Nepalese National TV Channel, Nepal Television. She is also known for her role as Video Jockey (VJ) in popular entertainment programs Sangeet Sandhya broadcast by Nepal Television and Rajatpat broadcast by Kantipur Television.

== Early life and family ==
Born in cultural city Bhaktapur, Nepal, Shahi is the daughter of Mr. Shiva Shahi and Ms. Saraswoti Shahi. She is of Nepalese descent, primarily from Newari community. Her childhood passed in care of her loving grand parents. Shahi has two older sisters and one younger brother. She started her early schooling from local school, where she completed her secondary education clearing School Leaving Certificate. During school days she used to participate actively in cultural programs. She was popular among the students and teachers. She was keenly interested in dance, which she improved over time. Her skilled dance and dedication lead her to fame in the local community. Then she started to get offers for participation in local dance and acting programs basically in cultural programs.

== Career ==
Shahi committed to acting professionally at the age of 17 and she started her early career as background dancer in movies. In year 2002, she won Miss Photogenic title in Mr. and Ms. Bhaktapur competition, which gave her initial publicity. With Miss Photogenic title in hand and after working in around 10 movies as background dancer, she received her first offer to work on television series Thorai Bhaye Pugi Sari and Sanka at the age of 18. Both of these series were public awareness series for improvement of family health and well being. Shanka was related to polio awareness and in Thorai Bhaye Pugi Sari, she played role of a grand daughter who not only search for her so abandoned grand parents, but also teach moral lesson to her parents for responsibilities of children towards parents. Her role was greatly appreciated by public. Shahi's good work and fame in the series became her stepping stone as an actress in Nepalese Movie Industry, also known as Kollywood. She started her career as an actress from the movie Bandaki, which was Box Office Hit and celebrated 100 days. From this first movie itself, she received the Best Newcomer Female Actress award in year 2005. The award was distrIbuted in the ceremony by His Majesty King Gyanendra Bir Bikram Shah Dev in the program organized by Film Development Board, Nepal.

With the remarkable success from the first movie itself, Shahi worked on popular Nepal Television Serial, MOD as a Lead Actress. MOD is one of the Super Hit Nepalese Serials in which she played role of Sakha. It had 75 plus episodes and is available on Youtube. She appeared from start to end in the serial as major actress. In parallel with the MOD Serial, she started to work as Lead Model in music videos. Some of the popular music videos in which she appeared were for hit songs like Affuno Maan Affai Sanga, Barta Garai Deu, K Cha Khaber Hajur Ko, Lahuray Ko Karima, Vhir Ma Chadyo Mali Gai and so forth, Chari Bhaye Auuthey Udayra being her first music video appearance.

Shahi's second movie was Pandav. She played role of a village girl who takes revenge for her family's massacre. With success as Nepalese movie actress and model, Shahi appeared on the cover of Glamour Plus Magazine, Kamana Magazine, Madhyapur Magazine and other magazines. Another television serial featuring Shahi was Aparajita which was broadcast by Nepal Television, and had 50 plus episodes. Her name in the serial was Salina. Aparajita was family drama in which she appeared from start to end as Lead Actress. With this success, she appeared in more music videos for Nepalese modern songs, Lok Dohari (folk songs) and also for bhajan songs.

Shahi's third movie was Jungali Maya in which she played Rumati, a village girl role from Raute community (Nomadic Tibeto-Burman ethnic group). Following years she played in other Nepalese movies like Jungali Manchey, Kheladi and also in several Newari movies, top three being Maya Re Ratna, Nipho Swan and Matina. In Maya Re Ratna movie, her name was Hasana as a lead artist and in Nipho Swan movie, she played as Prakriti. Jungali Manchey is Shahi's another Box Office Hit movie celebrating 51 days. The movie celebrated 51 days in popular cinema halls in Kathmandu like Guna Cinema Gwarko and Astha Narayan Pictures Kathmdandu. She appeared as guest artist in Naina Resham movie.

Shahi also worked as a video jockey on the popular entertainment programs Sangeet Sandhya, broadcast by Nepal Television, and Rajatpat, broadcast by Kantipur Television. Sangeet Sandhya was an entertainment program featuring updates on music, songs, and music videos. Rajatpat was a movie-update program featuring movie news, events, and reports on films and celebrities. She was also adored by the audience for this role. Shahi also successfully modeled for well-known and reputable brands. She promoted songs, new designs, products, clothing, and services through commercials, television shows, magazines, and fashion shows. Some of the notable brands she promoted through commercials included Merina Impex, a clothing company specializing in shirting and suiting; Himal Cement, related to housing; and Number 1, a condom brand. She also appeared in health-awareness commercials related to pregnancy care and the use of stretchers.

== Personal life ==
In July 2015, Shahi married Gyanesh Buda, a Software Engineer. The marriage happened in one of the holy temples in the capital, Kathmandu, Nepal according to Hindu rituals. Currently, she is living in the USA with her husband. The couple has two kids, one boy and one girl.

== Contributions ==
=== Movies ===
SN	Title	Category	Role	Notes
1	Bandhaki	Nepalese Movie	Sun Keshari (Lead Actress)	Box Office Hit, celebrating 100 days
2	Jungali Manchey	Nepalese Movie	Lead Actress	Box Office Hit, celebrating 51 days
3	Pandav	Nepalese Movie	Lead Actress	Action movie
4	Jungali Maya	Nepalese Movie	Rumati (Lead Actress)	As village girl from Raute community.
5	Kheladi	Nepalese Movie	Actress	Love story / Action
6	Bhavishya	Nepalese Movie	Lead Actress	Family movie
7	Ghayal Manchey	Nepalese Movie	Lead Actress	Love story / Action
8	Tri Dev	Nepalese Movie	Lead Actress	Action Movie
9	Maya Re Ratna	Newari Movie	Hasana (Lead Actress)	Love story movie
10	Nipho Swan	Newari Movie	Prakriti (Lead Actress)	Family movie
11	Matina	Newari Movie	Lead Actress	Love story movie
12	Naina Resham	Nepalese Movie	Actress	Guest artist

=== Television series ===
SN	Title	Role	Category	Channel	Notes
1.	Thorai Bhaye Pugi Sari	Actress	TV series	Nepal television	Public awareness TV series
2.	MOD	Sakha (Lead artist)	TV series	Nepal television	Family drama
3.	Aparajita	Salina (Lead artist)	TV series	Nepal television	Family drama
4.	Sanka	Lead Actress	TV series	Nepal Television	Public Awareness TV series
5.	Path Vrasta	Lead Actress	TV series	Nepal Television	Family drama
6.	Prasuna	Lead Actress	TV series	Nepal Television	Family drama
7.	Prarambha	Lead Actress	TV series	Nepal Television	Public Awareness TV series

=== Radio drama ===
SN	Title	Role	Category	Channel	Notes
1.	Jana Swasthya Karyakram	Drama Artiste	Radio drama	Radio Nepal	Public Health Awareness radio drama

=== Video jockey (VJ) ===
SN	Title	Role	Category	Channel	Notes
1.	Sangeet Sandhya	Video Jockey (VJ)	TV Entertainment Program	Nepal Television	Entertainment program related to music, songs and music video updates
2.	Rajatpat	Video Jockey (VJ)	TV entertainment program	Kantipur Television	Movie updates program with news, events, film reports

== Modeling ==
=== Music video appearances ===
SN	Title	Category	Singer / Movie
1	Musal Dhare Pani Paryaachha	Music Video	Bimalraj Chhetri, Rajendra Lamsal Chhetri and Bishnu Majhi
2	Antimpalta Bhet Garau Hai	Music Video	Human Adhikari and Bishnu Majhi
3	Barta Garai Deu	Music Video	Sindhu Malla and Ram Chandra Kafle
4	Affuno Maan Affai Sanga Dhatna Namilne	Music Video	Rahul Vaidhya
5	Batuwa Le Farkey Ra Herla, Chocolate Supari	Music Video	Balram Samal and Anjana Gurung
6	K Cha Khaber Hajur Ko	Music Video	Jagadish Samal
7	Darjalling Ko Ghumti Ma Ghumyo Rel	Music Video	Ram Chadra Kafle
8	K Timi Malai Jeevan Bhar Sath Dinchau Ra	Music Video	Pradeep Sapkota and Madavi Tripathi
9	Vhir Ma Chadyo Mali Gai	Music Video	Khuman Adhkari and Devi Gharti
10	Shakar Bhole Bam, Darshan Garna Pashupati Jam	Music Video	Pandit Ishwor Krishna Bhurtel
11	Reshami Dori Ma	Music Video	Ram Chadra Kafle
12	A Thule	Music Video	Krishna Thapa and Bishnu Majhi
13	Bhawana Ko Sagar	Music Video	Lekh Nath Dhakal
14	Chari Bhaye Auuthey Udayra	Music Video	Chandra Sharma, Raju Pariyar and Laxmi Neupane
15	Lahuray Ko Karima	Music Video	Raju Pariyar and Bima kumari Dura
16	Mhiga Bahani (Newari)	Music Video	Hikmat Bahadur Mali
17	Surkhet Ma BulBul Taal	Movie Song	Bandhaki Movie
18	Duniya Yo Goal Cha	Movie Song	Naina Resham Movie
19	Lyu Lyu Nhyo Nhyo Woya (Newari)	Movie Song	Nifo Swan Movie
20	Sumadhur Jiwaney Thau Nefo Swan Hola (Newari)	Movie Song	Nifo Swan Movie
21	Hai Re Ratna (Newari)	Movie Song	Maya Re Ratna Movie
22	Sworga Ki Pari Hau Ya Timi Dharti Ki Sundari Hau	Movie Song	Jungali Maya Movie
23	Jhasuka Tasan	Movie Song	Lochan Bhattarai, Nifo Swan Newari Movie

=== Magazine modeling ===
SN	Name	Category	Appearance
1.	Glamour Plus	Fashion Magazine	Cover Page
2.	Kamana	Entertainment Magazine	Cover Page
3.	Madhyapur	Cultural Magazine	Cover Page

=== Commercials ===
SN	Title	Category	Role	Channel
1.	Merina Impex	Clothing (Shirting and Suiting)	Model	Nepal Television
2.	Himal Cement	Housing	Model	Nepal Television
3.	Number 1	Condom	Model	Nepal Television
4.	Pregnancy Care	Health Awareness	Model	Nepal Television
5.	Stretchers Use	Health Awareness	Model	Nepal Television

== Awards ==
Year	Award	Category	Area	Result
2005	Nepali National Film Award, Nepal	Best Newcomer Female Actress	Movie (Bandhaki)	Won
2002	Mr. & Miss. Bhaktapur, Nepal	Miss Photogenic	Modeling	Won
