= 2082 Election Manifesto of RSP =

Rastriya Swantantra Party, Nepal

The 2082 election manifesto of the Rastriya Swatantra Party (RSP) in Nepal, titled "Bacha Patra 2082" or "Commitment Paper 2082," is a 22-page document outlining 100 policy commitments for the House of Representatives elections held on March 5, 2026 (2082 BS). Unveiled on February 19, 2026, in Surkhet by party chair Rabi Lamichhane and leaders like Balendra Shah, it emphasizes governance reform, economic growth, and digital transformation ahead of the polls.

== Background ==
RSP, founded in 2022 by journalist Rabi Lamichhane, rose rapidly as an anti-corruption force, securing seats in the 2022 federal elections. The 2082 manifesto, framed as a "Citizen Contract," responds to public disillusionment with traditional parties by promising measurable outcomes with accountability mechanisms like public progress reports and sanctions for failures. It targets the March 5, 2026, by-elections and positions RSP for post-poll government influence.

== Launch and structure ==
The manifesto launched at a mass rally in Surkhet's Ghantaghar Chowk, Karnali Province, marking RSP's second major provincial rollout. Structured around "100 Pillars of Policy Departure," it covers five priorities: integrity/governance, middle-class expansion, employment, connectivity, and diaspora engagement, with specific timelines and benchmarks.

== Key policy areas ==
=== Governance and administrative reform ===
RSP pledges a digital-first state, replacing queues with online services via an integrated database and platforms like tippani.gov.np. It commits to abolishing party-affiliated unions in civil service, creating an Autonomous Transfer Board, and investigating assets of officials since 2046 BS (1990 AD), nationalizing illegal gains. Judicial reforms include merit-based judge appointments, live court broadcasts, and amendments to CIAA, Constitutional Council, and Judicial Council Acts.

=== Economic targets and reforms ===
Aiming for 7% annual GDP growth, a $100 billion economy, and $3,000+ per capita income in 5-7 years, RSP promotes private-sector-led growth with government as facilitator. Tax reforms base burdens on "family load" (deductions for education/health); capital markets get intraday trading, derivatives, and NRN access. IT declared a "National Strategic Industry" targets $30 billion exports in 10 years via provincial digital parks and data centers powered by green energy.

ector	Key Targets
Economy	7% growth; $100B GDP; $3K/capita
IT Exports	$1.5B to $30B in 10 years
Energy	30,000 MW capacity in decade

=== Energy and infrastructure ===
RSP eyes 30,000 MW hydropower by amending laws for single-window clearances and government security for projects. It prioritizes domestic consumption (1,500 kWh/capita by 2035), energy-intensive industries, and exporting "computational power" via AI/data centers. Airports like Pokhara and Gautam Buddha get full operations; Tribhuvan expands, Nijgadh planned.

=== Social services and iInclusion ===
Commitments cover universal health insurance, public hospital upgrades, public education reforms with private complementarity, and integrated social security. A state apology to Dalits for historical discrimination promises anti-exclusion reforms; transitional justice completion. Agriculture focuses on import substitution, irrigation, and agritech.

=== Constitutional and political reforms ===
Proposals include directly elected executive, fully proportional parliament, MPs barred from minister roles, non-partisan locals, and improved provinces—via a 3-month discussion paper. Party reforms limit leadership to two terms, tie grants to votes.

=== Foreign policy and diaspora ===
Balanced diplomacy turns Nepal into a "vibrant bridge" between India/China, reviewing INR peg with experts. Diaspora gets voting rights, dual citizenship (with exceptions), investment ease, and a National Knowledge Bank. Border security uses tech-equipped Armed Police Force.
