= Hemanta Rawal =

Nepalese judge

- Occupation: High Court Judge

Hemanta Rawal is a high court judge serving at High Court in Nepal. He has also served as the spokesperson for Supreme Court of Nepal.

== Personal life ==
Rawal was born on 14 May 1966 in Jajarkot District. He has an LLM degree from Tribhuvan University.

== Decisions ==
Rawal is known for making a decision in the case of former television anchor Rabi Lamichhane, who was accused of provoking the suicide of journalist Shalikram Pudasaini. Other notable decisions are:

1. Sentenced the accused to 15 days imprisonment and a fine of Rs. 10,000 rupees and compensation of Rs. 15,000 for inhumane treatment relating to a witchcraft allegation.

2. Sentenced two sex offenders to twelve years in jail and Rs 50,000 as a compensation to each for gang-raping a 14-year girl.

3. Ruled that heated arguments with the police do not constitute an offense of indecent behavior and an arrest warrant should be issued before convicting an individual. The court emphasized that an arrest warrant had not been issued by a competent authority against the accused for the alleged incident, and it would be incorrect to convict him merely for reacting angrily without following due process.

4. Sentenced two accused to life for murdering their sister-in-law. The case had been stalling in the District Court for past 8 years.

5. Sentenced 1-month jail on the complainant along with the fine for filing false rape accusations against an innocent person.
