= Rabi Lamichhane =

Nepali politician and broadcaster (born 1975)

- रवि लामिछाने
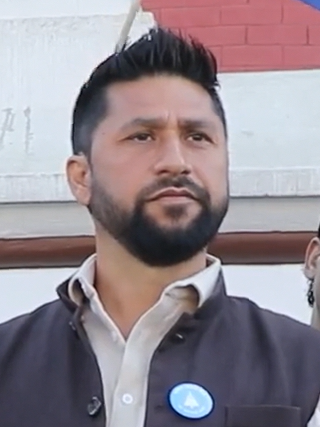
- Lamichhane in 2022

Deputy Prime Minister of Nepal
- In office 6 March 2024 – 15 July 2024 Serving with Narayan Kaji Shrestha and Raghubir Mahaseth
- President: Ram Chandra Paudel
- Prime Minister: Pushpa Kamal Dahal
- Preceded by: Purna Bahadur Khadka
- Succeeded by: Prakash Man Singh; Bishnu Prasad Paudel
- In office 26 December 2022 – 27 January 2023 Serving with Bishnu Prasad Paudel, Narayan Kaji Shrestha and Rajendra Prasad Lingden
- President: Bidya Devi Bhandari
- Prime Minister: Pushpa Kamal Dahal
- Preceded by: Raghubir Mahaseth; Rajendra Mahato
- Succeeded by: Purna Bahadur Khadka

Minister of Home Affairs
- In office 6 March 2024 – 15 July 2024
- Prime Minister: Pushpa Kamal Dahal
- Preceded by: Narayan Kaji Shrestha
- Succeeded by: Ramesh Lekhak
- In office 26 December 2022 – 27 January 2023
- Prime Minister: Pushpa Kamal Dahal
- Preceded by: Bal Krishna Khand
- Succeeded by: Narayan Kaji Shrestha

Member of the House of Representatives
- Incumbent
- Assumed office 26 April 2023
- Preceded by: Himself
- Constituency: Chitwan 2
- In office 22 December 2022 – 27 January 2023
- Preceded by: Krishna Bhakta Pokhrel
- Succeeded by: Himself
- Constituency: Chitwan 2

Chairperson of the Rastriya Swatantra Party
- Incumbent
- Assumed office 29 January 2023
- Deputy: Dol Prasad Aryal (until june 2026); Swarnim Wagle; Sobita Gautam
- Preceded by: Dol Prasad Aryal (acting)
- In office 1 July 2022 – 27 January 2023
- Deputy: Dol Prasad Aryal; Swarnim Wagle
- Preceded by: Position created
- Succeeded by: Dol Prasad Aryal (acting)

Personal details
- Born: 13 September 1975 (age 51) Nagarkot, Bhaktapur, Nepal
- Citizenship: Nepalese (until 2007; 2023–present); American (2007–2023)
- Party: Rastriya Swatantra Party
- Spouse(s): Isha Lamichhane (m. 1995; div. 2019) Nikita Poudel Lamichhane (m. 2019)
- Children: 3
- Profession: Politician; Lyricist; Journalist
- Awards: Guinness World Record

Rabi Lamichhane (Note: Nepali: रवि लामिछाने; Nepali pronunciation: [ɾʌbi lamit͡sʰane]) (born 13 September 1975) is a Nepali politician and broadcaster who has served as founding chairman of the Rastriya Swatantra Party (RSP) since 2022. He also served as Deputy Prime Minister and Minister of Home Affairs on two occasions, both under Prime Minister Pushpa Kamal Dahal.

Lamichhane was a member of the House of Representatives from Chitwan 2 from 28 April 2023 until the dissolution of the lower house on 12 September 2025. He was re-elected to the same seat in the 2026 general election with 54,402 votes, his third consecutive victory in the constituency.

Before entering politics, Lamichhane was a television presenter and journalist, where he gained widespread popularity.

== Broadcast career ==
Rabi Lamichhane is best known for setting the World Record for the longest-ever live television talk show broadcast in April 2013 on News24. He remained on air for more than 62 hours, surpassing the previous 52-hour record set by two Ukrainian presenters in 2011.

The marathon broadcast was centered on the theme “Buddha Was Born in Nepal”, aimed at promoting Nepal internationally. During the program, he interviewed politicians, journalists, celebrities, and other representative people, while also taking live phone calls from viewers. In total, he interviewed more than 100 individuals throughout the show. Under Guinness World Records rules, he was allowed a five-minute break every hour. Throughout the non-stop broadcast, he ate on air and maintained the show’s flow for over two-and-a-half days. The record has since been broken by Alexandru Raducanu of Romania, who hosted a show exceeding 72 hours.

He went on to host Sidha Kura Pradhanmantri Sanga (Straight Talk with the Prime Minister) with KP Sharma Oli on Nepal Television and News24, and later hosted Sidha Kura Janata Sanga on News24. Lamichhane resigned from News24 in January 2021 and launched a new version of his show, Sidha Kura, on Galaxy 4K TV.

== Political career ==
On 16 June 2022, Lamichhane announced his resignation from Galaxy 4K TV to contest the 2022 general election. He announced the formation of the Rastriya Swatantra Party on 21 June 2022, of which he remains chairman, and registered his candidacy from Chitwan 2.

Lamichhane was elected with 49,261 votes, defeating incumbent minister of state Umesh Shrestha of the Nepali Congress by a margin of 34,170 votes. His party then supported Pushpa Kamal Dahal's nomination for prime minister, and Lamichhane joined the government as deputy prime minister and minister of home affairs.

During his campaign, a complaint was filed alleging that Lamichhane had not renounced his Nepali citizenship while holding American citizenship, in violation of Nepal's prohibition on dual citizenship. On 27 January 2023, the Supreme Court of Nepal ruled that Lamichhane had not followed due process to reacquire Nepali citizenship and was therefore not a legal citizen, stripping him of his parliamentary seat and ministerial positions.

After reacquiring Nepali citizenship, he contested the by-election for Chitwan 2 in April 2023 and was re-elected with an even greater margin than in 2022.

=== 2026 general election and RSP's landslide victory ===
In the 2026 general election, held on 5 March 2026, Lamichhane won Chitwan 2 for a third consecutive time, securing 54,402 votes against his nearest rival Mina Kumari Kharel of the Nepali Congress, who received 14,564 votes — a victory margin of 39,838 votes. The RSP secured a near two-thirds majority in the House of Representatives, a historic result driven by a surge in support from younger voters following the 2025 Gen Z protest movement that had toppled the government of KP Sharma Oli.

Following the election, Lamichhane remained chairman of the RSP while the party moved to elect Balendra Shah — a prominent RSP leader and former mayor of Kathmandu — as parliamentary party leader and prime ministerial candidate, consistent with a seven-point agreement signed between the two leaders on 28 December 2025. At an orientation programme for newly elected RSP lawmakers on 18–19 March 2026, Lamichhane warned members that the party's "right to recall" provision would be enforced to maintain discipline, and called on them to prioritise lawmaking and constituency engagement over media appearances and ministerial lobbying.

=== Re-election as RSP chairperson ===
Lamichhane was re-elected unopposed as Chairperson of the Rastriya Swatantra Party at the party's first general convention held in Chitwan on 26 June 2026 after no other candidate filed a nomination for the post.

=== Electoral history ===
==== 2022 general election ====
| Candidate | Party | Votes | % |
|---|---|---|---|
| Rabi Lamichhane | Rastriya Swatantra Party | 49,300 | 61.05 |
| Umesh Shrestha | Nepali Congress | 14,988 | 18.56 |
| Krishna Bhakta Pokharel | CPN (UML) | 14,652 | 18.14 |
| Others | | 1,813 | 2.25 |
| Total | | 80,753 | 100.00 |
| Majority | | 34,312 | |
| Rastriya Swatantra Party gain | | | |
Source: ECN

==== 2023 by-election ====
| Candidate | Party | Votes | % |
|---|---|---|---|
| Rabi Lamichhane | Rastriya Swatantra Party | 54,176 | 70.03 |
| Jit Narayan Shrestha | Nepali Congress | 11,214 | 14.49 |
| Ram Prasad Neupane | CPN (UML) | 10,936 | 14.14 |
| Others | | 1,040 | 1.34 |
| Total | | 77,366 | 100.00 |
| Majority | | 42,962 | |
| Rastriya Swatantra Party hold | | | |
Source: ECN

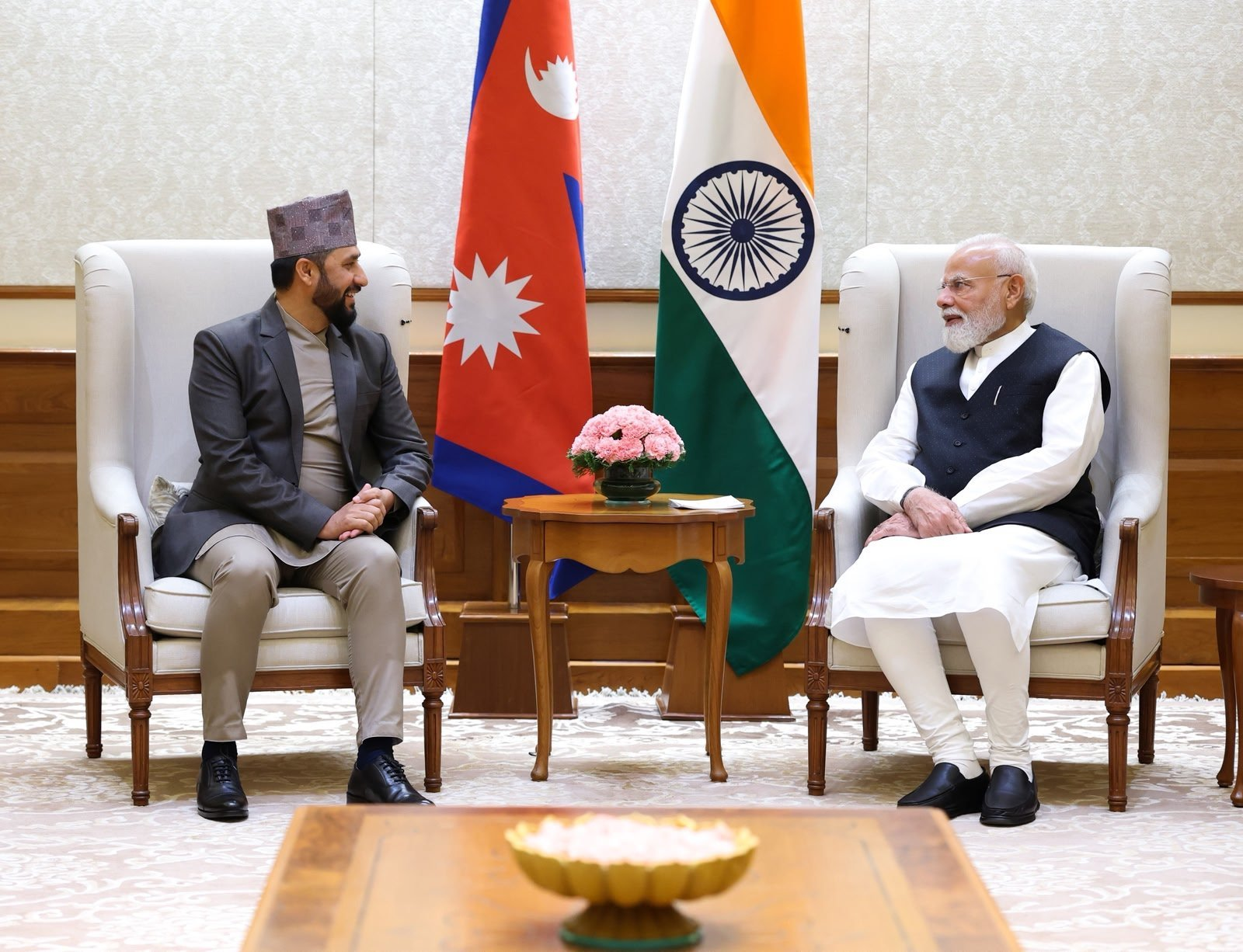
Rabi Lamichhane with PM Narendra Modi of India during his visit to India on 2026

==== 2026 general election ====
| Candidate | Party | Votes | % |
|---|---|---|---|
| Rabi Lamichhane | Rastriya Swatantra Party | 54,402 | 78.88 |
| Mina Kumari Kharel | Nepali Congress | 14,564 | 21.12 |
| Total | | 68,966 | 100.00 |
| Majority | | 39,838 | |
| Rastriya Swatantra Party hold | | | |
Source: ECN

== Ministerial tenures ==
Lamichhane has served twice as Deputy Prime Minister and Minister of Home Affairs, both times under Prime Minister Pushpa Kamal Dahal. Across both terms, the Rastriya Swatantra Party alternated coalition cooperation between Dahal's Communist Party of Nepal (Maoist Centre) and K. P. Sharma Oli's Communist Party of Nepal (Unified Marxist–Leninist), reflecting a pragmatic approach to Nepal's coalition politics.

=== First term (December 2022 – January 2023) ===
On 26 December 2022, Lamichhane was appointed Deputy Prime Minister and Minister of Home Affairs following the RSP's decision to back Dahal's bid for premiership.

During this period, Lamichhane emphasized administrative transparency and pledged to modernize the internal security system. His tenure ended abruptly on 27 January 2023, when the Supreme Court of Nepal ruled that he had not properly reacquired Nepali citizenship after renouncing his U.S. citizenship, invalidating both his parliamentary seat and his ministerial appointment. He subsequently tendered his resignation to Prime Minister Dahal.

=== Second term (March – July 2024) ===
After regaining Nepali citizenship and winning the Chitwan 2 by-election, Lamichhane was reappointed as Deputy Prime Minister and Minister of Home Affairs on 6 March 2024.

In his second term, Lamichhane initiated internal administrative reforms, including the removal of politically appointed police and bureaucratic officials who had overstayed their legal tenure. His agenda also included enhancing coordination between federal and provincial police bodies, curbing corruption in transfer processes, and promoting digital governance. His term ended on 15 July 2024 following a change in coalition arrangements.

== Cooperative fraud case and detention (2025) ==
In early 2025, Lamichhane was arrested in connection with allegations of embezzlement involving multiple savings and credit cooperatives across Nepal (This case is still in court, yet to receive final verdict). He was initially held at Rupandehi District Prison from 4 April 2025, following a joint bench of the Tulsipur High Court overturning a lower court's bail order. The cooperative fraud case alleged that Lamichhane and others had transferred over Rs109 million from the Butwal-based Supreme Savings and Credit Cooperative to Gorkha Media Network Pvt Ltd, a media company of which Lamichhane was managing director before entering politics. He faced additional charges in cooperatives based in Kathmandu, Pokhara, Chitwan, and Parsa. The Supreme Court of Nepal upheld his detention on 22 May 2025.

After spending 84 days in custody in Kaski District, Lamichhane was released on a bail of Rs6.5 million by the Kaski District Court in January 2025, pending further proceedings in the Pokhara-based Suryadarshan Cooperative case. He was subsequently returned to custody at Nakkhu Prison in Kathmandu over the Supreme Cooperative fraud case in Butwal.

=== Temporary release during Gen Z protests ===
During the Gen Z-led protests of September 2025, which resulted in widespread unrest and the storming of several prisons across Nepal, Lamichhane left Nakkhu Prison on 9 September 2025. He later told a government investigation commission that he had not escaped but had been released with the knowledge and cooperation of prison authorities and police leadership. His departure from prison drew significant public criticism. He voluntarily returned to Nakkhu Prison a few days later, posting on Facebook: "I am sending myself back to jail as a birthday gift."

=== Release on bail and charge sheet amendment ===
On 18 December 2025, the Butwal bench of the Tulsipur High Court ordered Lamichhane's release on bail of Rs27.48 million in the Supreme Cooperative fraud case. He was formally released on 19 December 2025 after completing the necessary paperwork at the Rupandehi District Court.

On 30 December 2025, Attorney General Sabita Bhandari amended the charge sheets filed in district courts in Kaski, Kathmandu, Rupandehi, and Parsa, removing claims related to "organised crime" and "money laundering" against Lamichhane. This decision was subsequently challenged by a writ petition, and the Supreme Court of Nepal ordered the Attorney General's Office to submit additional original documents to justify the amendment. As of March 2026, the cooperative fraud case remains ongoing and sub judice.

== Legal issues ==
=== Suicide incitement ===
On 15 August 2019, police arrested Lamichhane from his News 24 office in connection with the suicide of journalist Shalikram Pudasaini. In a video recorded before his death, Pudasaini, who had also worked for News24, had named Lamichhane, among others, as driving him to suicide. Chitwan police charged Lamichhane, along with two others, with abetment of suicide. His arrest provoked widespread protest rallies in his support across the country, with thousands of young people taking to the streets in Chitwan. Protestors saw Lamichhane's arrest as an attempt to stifle his journalism and retaliation for his exposure of corruption in the state. Chitwan District Court released Lamichhane on Rs 500,000 bail a few days later. Judge Hemanta Rawal eventually cleared Lamichhane of all charges.

=== Legal cases in the United States ===
Lamichhane has been involved in several financial and civil legal cases in the United States, mainly in the state of Maryland. Records from the Maryland Judiciary Case Search list multiple filings under his name related to credit and financial disputes during his stay in the U.S. One notable case, numbered 03L19001768 in the Baltimore County Circuit Court, involves financial claims by credit institutions. In total, nine cases were filed against him in Maryland, including one concerning alleged tax evasion by a company registered under his ownership. Several of these matters were resolved through civil proceedings. The filings can be reviewed through the official Maryland Judiciary Case Search portal.

=== Citizenship ===
Lamichhane initially traveled to the United States on a visitor visa before eventually acquiring American citizenship. He was an American citizen from 2007 to 2017. He claimed that his previous Nepali citizenship was revived following the renunciation of his American citizenship. A ruling of the Supreme Court of Nepal on 27 January 2023 removed him from all public offices (deputy prime minister and home minister; party chairman and parliamentary party leader) and as Member of Parliament for not following due process and obtaining a new Nepali citizenship after renouncing his American citizenship in 2017. He re-acquired Nepali citizenship following due process on 29 January 2023.

=== Dual passport ===
In 2015, Lamichhane was accused of obtaining a Nepali passport while holding both U.S. and Nepali passports, which is illegal under Nepali law that forbids dual citizenship and passports. The attorney general of Nepal declined to prosecute Lamichhane for passport issues, with the Supreme Court declining to consider it as part of their case regarding Lamichhane's citizenship.

=== National ID Contract Scandal ===
Another controversy involving Lamichhane emerged during his tenure as Home Minister, when he approved a highly contentious procedure to award a contract to a private international company for the management and verification of citizens' personal and biometric data related to the National Identity Card system. In clear violation of Nepal’s Public Procurement Act, which mandates a minimum of 45 days for international tenders. Lamichhane authorized a bidding process that lasted only seven days, bypassing necessary consultations with key ministries, including Finance and Law. The awarded company, Advantage International Pvt. Ltd., had already secured five prior contracts with the Department of National Identity and Civil Registration, raising further concerns over favoritism and procedural manipulation. The Cabinet later annulled the procedure and canceled the contract, citing flaws in the process and concerns over state security. A government investigation was launched, and the company’s security deposit was seized. Critics argue that this decision reflected arbitrary and non-transparent governance, especially given the broader opacity of the National ID project, which had long been criticized for its lack of financial and procedural disclosure. Whether knowingly or negligently, Lamichhane's actions have been widely condemned as another instance of misuse of power during his time in office.

=== Foundation Fraud Allegations ===
Ravi Lamichhane, President of the Rastriya Swatantra Party (RSWP), is under investigation for fraud, money laundering, and organized crime. He is also accused of misusing funds raised through his Ravi Lamichhane Foundation, established to build a hospital in Raskot, Kalikot.

Despite claiming the foundation was in debt, Lamichhane transferred large sums, including Rs 40 lakh, to his wife Nikita Poudel’s account. The funds, which were supposed to support the hospital, were reportedly used for personal expenses. Lamichhane also sought government subsidies by misrepresenting the foundation’s financial status, securing Rs 40.9 million from an IMF loan meant for Nepal's economic recovery. The hospital’s construction has been criticized for questionable costs and the quality of materials used, sparking further allegations of corruption and embezzlement.

=== Cooperative ===
In early 2024, Kantipur Daily began publishing a series of articles alleging Lamichhane's involvement in financial embezzlement from cooperatives. Although the primary accused was Gitendra Babu Rai, who owned the cooperative, Lamichhane was alleged to be involved, as his name and signature were on financial documents. Lamichhane denied all accusations and said that his name and signature were misused.

A parliamentary investigation committee was formed on 18 May 2024, to investigate fraud and embezzlement in Nepal's financial cooperatives. The committee determined that Rai, Lamichhane, and Director Chhabilal Joshi operated a joint account to disburse salaries and allowances to cooperative employees. Through spokesperson Manish Jha, the Rastriya Swatantra Party claimed that the report disproves Lamichhane's complicity; however, Dhruba Bahadur Pradhan (also Retd. Inspector General of Police) of the Rastriya Prajantra Party claimed that Lamichhane could still be prosecuted for his involvement.

Verdict by the High Court of Nepal

He was arrested on the evening of 4 April 2025, following a ruling by the Butwal bench of the Tulsipur High Court. The court overturned a previous bail decision by the Rupandehi District Court in a cooperative fraud case. Lamichhane faces charges of fraud and organized crime related to the Supreme Cooperative case, which involves allegations of embezzlement of millions of rupees. He expressed his willingness to cooperate with the court while maintaining his innocence. The ruling also paves the way for his transfer to Rupandehi for further legal proceedings.

==== Verdict by the Supreme Court of Nepal ====
On 23 May 2025, the Supreme Court of Nepal upheld the Tulsipur High Court's decision, dismissing a habeas corpus petition filed by Lamichhane’s wife, Nikita Poudel, and affirming that there was sufficient prima facie evidence of his involvement.

The Court concluded that the lower courts did not err in ordering his remand and stated, “Based on the immediately available evidence, it could not be reasonably believed that the defendants were innocent of the alleged offence.” As a result, Lamichhane is to remain in judicial custody until the Rupandehi District Court delivers its verdict. He will only be released if acquitted in the Supreme Cooperative case and cleared of other pending charges. The ruling also emphasized the risk of evidence tampering and the need to preserve public trust in the judiciary.

==== District Court - Bail Petition ====
In early August 2025, Lamichhane filed a fresh bail petition at the Rupandehi District Court with a bank guarantee of NPR 27.48 million, the amount linked to him in the cooperative fraud case. The hearing was shifted between benches after one judge recused and the defence sought postponement, which some media described as “bench-shopping.” On 11 August, the court rejected the petition and kept him in custody at Rupandehi/Bhairahawa prison. That day, a lawyer also complained to the Judicial Council, alleging the bail filing was improper and seeking an investigation into related judicial conduct.

After the district court rejected the petition, Lamichhane appealed with the high court and was eventually released from custody on a bail of NPR 37.4 million by the Butwal Bench of Tulsipur High Court.

=== Controversial Release from Nakkhu Jail ===
In 9 September 2025, during the Gen Z protests in Nepal, politician Lamichhane was released from custody at Nakkhu Prison in Lalitpur amid widespread unrest and handed over to his wife Nikita Poudel. A circulated letter, bearing the seal of Nakkhu prison, stated that Lamichhane was released under “special circumstances” on the orders of the Home Secretary, citing potential injustice from delays in legal proceedings. Prison authorities later denied issuing the letter, calling it unauthorized.

Crowds of Rastriya Swatantra Party supporters gathered in front of Nakkhu Prison demanding Lamichhane’s release. According to reports, senior RSP politicians, including Members of Parliament Hari Dhakal, DP Aryal, and Bipin Acharya, joined the demonstrations and warned prison officials that Lamichhane must be freed. After Lamichhane was released from Nakhkhu Jail, all inmates left the facility due to the absence of police at their security posts. During the protests, over 13,000 inmates escaped from prisons across Nepal, making it one of the largest prison breaks in the country’s history.

After prison authorities issued a notice ordering all escaped inmates to surrender, warning that failure to comply would result in additional penalties, Lamichhane voluntarily returned to Nakkhu Jail on 13 September 2025 carrying his belongings. Rabi Lamichhane was re-released after submitting Rs 37.4 million Bail bond on 19 December 2025 as per the order of Rupandehi District Court in Bhairahawa district.

==== Internal dissent and departure of Sumana Shrestha ====
Amid the controversy over Lamichhane’s release, internal fissures within RSP surfaced. On 14 September 2025, Sumana Shrestha publicly announced her resignation from the party, citing a culture of impunity among the leadership, internal media trials of dissenting voices, and the repeated expectation that rank-and-file members bear the burden of mistakes that leaders refuse to admit. In her resignation message, she criticized the tendency in RSP to place the party above the country and the leader above the party, and claimed that internal critics were subjected to “media trials” rather than genuine dialogue.

== Criticism ==
While Lamichhane has become one of Nepal's most prominent public figures, critics have raised questions about his journalistic style and the "cult of personality" surrounding him, pointing to what they describe as "nationalist posturing" and "simplistic storylines".

On 5 February 2023, following the Supreme Court ruling that stripped him of his positions, Lamichhane held a press conference alleging that mainstream media owners had conspired to defame him. The Federation of Nepali Journalists condemned his remarks as an attack on the media industry.

== Personal life ==
Lamichhane was married to Isha Lamichhane from 1995 until their divorce in January 2019. Although the couple reportedly separated around 2009, they remained legally married until finalizing their divorce a decade later. They have two daughters, Richa and Riya Lamichhane, who later moved to the United States with their mother.

On 21 January 2019, shortly after his divorce, Lamichhane married Nikita Poudel, then chairperson of the Nepal Film Development Board.

=== Controversies ===
According to his former wife Isha Lamichhane, Lamichhane left for the United States without informing her, after which she received threatening calls from a woman claiming to have children with him. Isha also alleged that Lamichhane had a relationship with a foreign woman that resulted in the birth of a son outside their marriage. Reports also alleged that while Isha was living in the United States, Lamichhane was engaged in a relationship with Nikita Poudel, whom he married days after his divorce in 2019.

== See also ==
- 2025 Nepalese Gen Z protests – Youth-led nationwide protests in Nepal calling for political reform and better governance.
- 2026 Nepalese General Election – A parliamentary election held following the 2025 Nepalese Gen Z protests in which Balen Shah won representing the Rastriya Swatantra Party and became Prime Minister of Nepal.
