= Ministry of Education, Science and Technology (Nepal) =

Government ministry of Nepal

- शिक्षा, विज्ञान तथा प्रविधि मन्त्रालय
- Emblem of Nepal

Agency overview
- Formed: 1951
- Dissolved: 13 May 2026
- Superseding agencies: Ministry of Education and Sports; Ministry of Science, Technology and Innovation
- Jurisdiction: Government of Nepal
- Headquarters: Singha Durbar, Kathmandu, Nepal
- Minister responsible: Sasmit Pokharel (last holder)
- Website: moest.gov.np

The Ministry of Education, Science and Technology (Nepali: शिक्षा, विज्ञान तथा प्रविधि मन्त्रालय) was a governmental body of Nepal responsible for the overall development of education in Nepal. The ministry was responsible for formulating educational policies and plans and managing and implementing them across the country through the institutions under it. In 2018, under the Second Oli cabinet, the portfolio of the ministry was enlarged and the portfolios of Science and Technology were added to the then Ministry of Education, while the Ministry of Science and Technology was discontinued.

The ministry was dissolved and divided into two parts: Ministry of Science, Technology and Innovation and Ministry of Education and Sports as a part of administrative restructuring by Balendra Shah-led government under Nepal Government (Work Division) Regulations, 2083 on 13 May 2026.

== Former Ministers of Education ==
This is a list of all ministers of Education since the Nepalese Constituent Assembly election in 2013:

SN	Name	Party	Assumed office	Left office
1	Chitra Lekha Yadav	Nepali Congress	25 February 2014	
2	Giriraj Mani Pokharel	Communist Party of Nepal (Maoist Centre)	19 October 2015	
3	Dhaniram Paudel	Communist Party of Nepal (Maoist Centre)	14 August 2016	31 May 2017
4	Gopal Man Shrestha	Nepal Loktantrik Forum	7 June 2017	15 February 2018
5	Giriraj Mani Pokharel	Communist Party of Nepal (Maoist Centre)	16 March 2018	20 December 2020
6	Krishna Gopal Shrestha	CPN UML	25 December 2020	13 July 2021
7	Devendra Paudel	Communist Party of Nepal (Maoist Centre)	8 October 2021	26 December 2022
8	Shishir Khanal	Rastriya Swatantra Party	17 January 2023	5 February 2023
9	Ashok Rai	People's Socialist Party, Nepal	31 March 2023	4 March 2024
10	Sumana Shrestha	Rastriya Swatantra Party	6 March 2024	15 July 2024
11	Bidya Bhattarai	CPN UML	15 July 2024	22 April 2025
12	Raghuji Pant	CPN UML	24 April 2025	9 September 2025
13	Sushila Karki	Independent	12 September 2025	22 September 2025
14	Mahabir Pun	Independent	22 September 2025	20 January 2026
15	Sasmit Pokharel	RSP	27 March 2026	13 May 2026 (last holder)

== See also ==
- Gender inequality in Nepal
- Human rights in Nepal
- List of schools in Nepal
- List of engineering colleges in Nepal (intake capacity of engineering colleges)
- List of universities and colleges in Nepal
