= Secondary Education Examination (Nepal) =

Board Examination of Grade 10 in Nepal

Examination Board for Grade 10 in Nepal
- Acronym: SEE
- Education Act: 2073 B.S (2016 A.D)
- Year Started: 2074 B.S (2017; 9 years ago A.D)
- Predecessor: School Leaving Certificate (Nepal)
- Website: see.gov.np

Secondary Education Examination (SEE) is the final examination of the Grade 10 in Nepal which is conducted by National Examination Board. According to the Education Act of Nepal, students are required to pass this examination to complete Grade 10 and to progress to Grade 11 and 12 (+2). The SEE examination is scheduled in March of every year. SEE was previously known as SLC; however, following the implementation of Education Act, 2016 (2073), the grade 10 examination was renamed SEE, while the SLC was reassigned as the national-level final examination of Grade 12. This new Education Act was implemented from March 2017 with about 538,000 students appearing for SEE.

== Grading System ==
The following are the details of the new grading system in Nepal that were revised in the year 2022 (2078 BS) for upto class 12.

SN	Score Interval in Percent	Grade	Grade Point	Description
1	90% to 100%	A+	4.0	Outstanding
2	80% to 90%	A	3.6	Excellent
3	70% to 80%	B+	3.2	Very Good
4	60% to 70%	B	2.8	Good
5	50% to 60%	C+	2.4	Satisfactory
6	40% to 50%	C	2.0	Acceptable
7	35% to 40%	D	1.6	Basic
8	Below 35%	NG	0	Not Graded

Note:

- Scores less than 1.60 GPA are not graded.
- A+ — Including 4.0

The following are the details of the old grading system in Nepal which is implemented by the Nepal Government by developing the New Education Act 2073 for upto class 12.

SN	Score Interval in Percent	Grade	Description	Grade Point
1	90 to 100	A+	Outstanding	3.65 - 4.00
2	80 to below 90	A	Excellent	3.25 - 3.65
3	70 to below 80	B+	Very Good	2.80 - 3.25
4	60 to below 70	B	Good	2.40 - 2.80
5	50 to below 60	C+	Satisfactory	2.00 - 2.40
6	40 to below 50	C	Acceptable	1.60 - 2.00
7	35 to below 40	D	Basic	1.60
8	0 to below 35	NG	Not Graded	0.00 -0.00

Note:

- Scores less than 0.80 GPA are not acceptable anywhere.
- A+ — Including 3.65

== Results ==
Batch (BS)	Result date	3.6-4.0 GPA	3.2-3.6 GPA	2.8-3.2 GPA	2.4-2.8 GPA	2.0-2.4 GPA	1.6-2.0 GPA	Not Graded (NG)	Total Participation
2080	2081/03/13	31209	68256	78874	41477	2950	6	242313	464785
2081	2082/03/27	48177	81385	89124	48479	4126	8	167597	438896
2082	2083/01/28	48392	80372	94222	55977	5190	7	146507	430667

== See also ==
- District Level Examination
- National Examination Board
- School Leaving Certificate (Nepal)
- Education in Nepal
- List of schools in Nepal
- List of engineering colleges in Nepal (intake capacity of engineering colleges)
