= Yadav Kharel =

Nepali film director, producer and writer (born 1943)

Yadav Kharel (Nepali: यादव खरेल; born 23 February 1943) is a Nepali film director, producer and writer. Being one of the most acclaimed directors in Nepali film industry, Kharel was the founding chairperson of Film Development Board, Nepal (2000–2002).

Kharel, a veteran director and academic, is one of the first filmmakers to earn a diploma in movie direction and production. He started his career in media as a program host in Radio Nepal and became involved in film direction later.
