= Minister of Youth and Sports (Nepal) =

Head of the Ministry of Youth and Sports

Minister of Youth & Sports
- युवा तथा खेलकुद मन्त्री
- Emblem of Nepal

- Flag of Nepal
- Incumbent; Sasmit Pokharel since 27 March 2026
- Ministry of Youth and Sports
- Style: His Excellency
- Member of: Council of Ministers
- Reports to: Prime Minister
- Nominator: Prime Minister
- Appointer: The president
- Term length: No fixed term
- Formation: 2009; 17 years ago

The Minister of Youth and Sports (or simply, the Sports Minister, ( Nepali: युवा तथा खेलकुद मन्त्री ) is the head of the Ministry of Youth and Sports of the Government of Nepal. One of the senior-most officers in the Federal Cabinet, the youth and sports minister is responsible for the youth development and sports activities of the government.

The current minister is Sasmit Pokharel who took office on 27 March 2026 after the formation of new government under Balendra Shah.

== List of ministers of youth and sports ==
This is a list of former Ministers of Youth and Sports since the Nepalese Constituent Assembly election in 2013:

S. No	Name	Party	Assumed office	Left office
1	Purusottam Poudel	Communist Party of Nepal (Unified Marxist–Leninist)	25 February 2014	12 October 2015
2	Satya Narayan Mandal	Communist Party of Nepal (Unified Marxist–Leninist)	19 October 2015	4 August 2016
3	Daljit Shreepaili	Communist Party of Nepal (Maoist Centre)	4 August 2016	31 May 2017
4	Rajendra Kumar KC	Nepali Congress	26 July 2017	15 February 2018
5	Jagat Bahadur Sunar Bishwakarma	Communist Party of Nepal (Unified Marxist–Leninist) until 17 May 2018; Nepal Communist Party from 17 May 2018	16 March 2018	25 December 2020
6	Dawa Lama Tamang	Communist Party of Nepal (Maoist Centre) until 17 May 2018; CPN UML from 8 March 2021	25 December 2020	20 May 2021
7	Ekbal Miya	Federal Socialist Forum, Nepal	4 June 2021	22 May 2021
8	Maheshwar Jung Gahatraj	Communist Party of Nepal (Maoist Centre)	8 October 2021	26 December 2022
9	Dig Bahadur Limbu	Nepali Congress	3 May 2023	5 March 2024
10	Biraj Bhakta Shrestha	Rastriya Swatantra Party	6 March 2024	15 July 2024
11	Teju Lal Chaudhary	Nepali Congress	15 July 2024	9 September 2025
12	Bablu Gupta	Independent	26 October 2025	19 January 2026
13	Sasmit Pokharel	Rastriya Swatantra Party	27 March 2026	Incumbent
