= National Innovation Center =

Nepali organisation

- राष्ट्रिय आविष्कार केन्द्र
- Formation: November 9, 2012; 13 years ago
- Purpose: Science and Technology
- Headquarters: Tribhuvan University, Kritipur
- Key people: Mahabir Pun
- Website: nicnepal.org

The National Innovation Center (Nepali: राष्ट्रिय आविष्कार केन्द्र) is a Nepali nonprofit organization established by social entrepreneur Mahabir Pun on November 9, 2012. The center was established to sponsor proposed entrepreneurship projects in Nepal and prevent brain drain. In 2019, Tribhuvan University donated land for the construction of the center, and it was constructed at a cost of Rs. 8 crore on the university's campus in Kirtipur.

== Funding ==
Prior to July 2016, Mahabir Pun met with Nepali government officials to request funding for the center. After his requests went unanswered, he began a crowdfunding campaign, which raised Rs. 50 million in six months. Pun's long-term plan to fund the center involved the construction of a hydroelectric power station, which would raise money through the sale of electricity. Mahabir also pledged to sell 28 ropanis of his privately-owned land (roughly 14,000 square meters) to raise money for the center's construction.

== Objectives ==
The primary objective of the National Innovation Center is to promote a culture of research and technological innovation in Nepal. Pun has described the Center as helping Nepalis "become entrepreneurs so they can contribute to the economic development of the nation." A stated goal of the center is combating brain drain by providing opportunities for entrepreneurs to pursue innovative projects in Nepal.

== Founding members ==
The founding members of the organization include:

- Mahabir Pun, Nepali Minister of Science, Technology and Innovation.
- Rameshwor Prasad Khanal, former Nepali Minister of Finance
- Dambar Nepali, a hydroelectricity expert.

== Notable projects ==
The stated goal of the NIC is to sponsor projects with the potential to serve the needs of Nepali communities. According to Pun, the center does not discriminate based on academic qualifications when selecting projects. As of 2019, the center has sponsored a total of 20 different projects.

=== Medical drones ===
In 2020, the NIC collaborated with Prokura Innovations and the UNICEF Venture Fund to develop a fleet of prototype drones capable of delivering medicines to otherwise inaccessible areas in mountainous terrain. The design, fabrication and testing of the drones were done in Nepal by a group of engineering students. The drones have successfully demonstrated the ability to carry a payload weighing 1 kg over a distance of 2 kilometers..

=== Sel roti machine ===
In 2020, Abhisek Nakarmi and Krishna Deole, two students working under the aegis of the NIC, developed a machine to mass-produce sel roti, a traditional Nepali dish made from rice flour.

=== Monkey repellent system ===
In 2020, the NIC began experiments to study the viability of an audio-based monkey repellent system. In Nepal, monkeys frequently raid corn fields and cause significant crop destruction; the proposed project aims to make a device powered by solar energy that can sense and repel wild animals by producing different sounds.

=== Online bus ticketing platform ===
'OK Journey', a bus ticket booking app and online platform, was started at the NIC by Rajesh Das. The goal of the app is to reduce wait times for purchasing bus tickets in Nepal.

== COVID-19 response ==
During the 2020 COVID-19 pandemic, the NIC actively participated in various assistance programs. It distributed personal protective equipment to ambulance drivers and health workers., and opened swab collection booths at several hospitals in Kathmandu, including Bir Hospital, Birendra Hospital, APF Hospital, Bhaktapur Cancer Hospital, and Teku Hospital. The center also offered complimentary ventilator repair services to various hospitals.

== Industrial collaboration ==
The NIC has collaborated with various commercial organizations. It has worked to produce fodder at a commercial scale for chicken and fish farms in the Chitwan District of Nepal. It has also promoted tourism and agricultural development in several cities, including Biratnagar and Pokhara.
