= Bala Nanda Sharma =

Bala Nanda Sharma is a retired three-star general officer of Nepal Army who served as Minister of Foreign Affairs in the Sushila Karki led interim Government from December 2025 to March 2026.

== Military career ==
He joined the Nepal Army in 1967 and was commissioned into the Nepali Army in 1969. In January 2004, he joined to UNDOF after being appointed by then UN Secretary General Kofi Annan as its Force Commander after replacing General Franciszek Gągor. He retired from active military service in 2007.

== Premiership as Foreign Minister ==
In December 2025, he was sworn in as Foreign minister, he was replaced by Shishir Khanal on March 27.
