= Gopal Man Shrestha =

Nepali politician (1947–2026)

Honourable Gopal Man Shrestha
- गोपालमान श्रेष्ठ

Deputy Prime Minister and Education Minister of Nepal
- In office 7 June 2017 – 15 February 2018
- President: Bidhya Devi Bhandari
- Prime Minister: Sher Bahadur Deuba
- Preceded by: Dhaniram Paudel
- Succeeded by: Giriraj Mani Pokharel

Member of the Constituent Assembly / Legislature Parliament
- In office 21 January 2014 – 14 October 2017
- PR group: Indigenous
- Constituency: Nepali Congress PR list
- In office 28 May 2008 – 28 May 2012
- Preceded by: himself (as Member of Parliament)
- Succeeded by: Kamal Prasad Pangeni
- Constituency: Syangja 2

Member of Parliament, Pratinidhi Sabha
- In office 15 January 2007 – 18 January 2008
- Prime Minister: Girija Prasad Koirala
- Constituency: Syangja 2
- In office 31 May 1999 – 21 May 2002
- Prime Minister: Krishna Prasad Bhattarai, Girija Prasad Koirala, Sher Bahadur Deuba
- Preceded by: Dhruba Raj Lamsal
- Succeeded by: himself
- Constituency: Syangja 2

Member of House of Representatives
- In office 20 June 1991 – 11 July 1994
- Prime Minister: Girija Prasad Koirala
- Preceded by: Constituency created
- Succeeded by: Trilochan Sharma Dhakal
- Constituency: Syangja 1

Personal details
- Born: 15 July 1947 Putalibazar, Syangja, Nepal
- Died: 28 July 2026 (aged 79) Jawalakhel, Nepal
- Party: Nepali Congress (before 2002; 2007–2026)
- Other political affiliations: Nepali Congress (Democratic) (2002–2007)
- Education: Tribhuvan University (Bachelor of Economics)

Gopal Man Shrestha (Nepali/Nepal Bhasa: गोपालमान श्रेष्ठ; 15 July 1947 – 28 July 2026) was a Nepali politician. He was elected to the Pratinidhi Sabha in the 1999 election on behalf of the Nepali Congress. Shrestha served as Acting President of Nepali Congress (Democratic). He was a senior CWC member. Shrestha previously served as the Deputy Prime Minister and Minister of Education under Sher Bahadur Deuba led government. He hailed from Syangja District.

Shrestha died on 28 July 2026, at the age of 83, having been ill with pancreatic cancer for a year.
