= Sumana Shrestha =

Nepalese Education, Science and Technology Minister

- सुमना श्रेष्ठ

Minister of Education, Science and Technology
- In office 6 March 2024 – 15 July 2024
- President: Ram Chandra Poudel
- Prime Minister: Pushpa Kamal Dahal
- Preceded by: Ashok Rai
- Succeeded by: Bidya Bhattarai

Member of Parliament, Pratinidhi Sabha
- In office 22 December 2022 – 9 September 2025
- President: Bidhya Devi Bhandari; Ram Chandra Paudel
- Constituency: Party list (Rastriya Swatantra Party)

Personal details
- Born: 1 October 1984 (age 42) Kathmandu, Nepal
- Party: Independent
- Other political affiliations: Rastriya Swatantra Party (2022 - 2025)
- Spouse: Pawel Skawinski
- Parents: Ramesh Prasad Shrestha (father); Mina Devi (mother)
- Education: Budhanilkantha School (A-Level); Bryn Mawr College; Haverford College; MIT Sloan School of Management (MBA)
- Website: Official website

Sumana Shrestha (Nepali: सुमना श्रेष्ठ, Nepali pronunciation: [sumʌna sresʈʰʌ]) is a Nepalese politician and former Minister of Education, Science and Technology. She was elected member of the Federal Parliament in the 6th House of Representatives, representing the Rastriya Swatantra Party in 2022. Shrestha resigned from the party on 14 September 2025, citing its culture of leader-worship.

Additionally, Shrestha was a member of the Education, Health, and Information Technology Committee of the House of Representatives (2079). Within the Rastriya Swatantra Party (RSP), she was a member of the Central Committee, also served a short tenure as Joint Secretary and served as the chairperson of both the Education Department and the Science, Communication, and Information Technology Department.

== Early life and education ==
Sumana Shrestha was born on 1 October 1984, in Kathmandu. She attended Saraswati Boarding Higher Secondary School in Chhetrapati, where she completed her School Leaving Certificate. Subsequently, she pursued her A-Levels in Economics and Mathematics at Budhanilkantha School. After graduating from high school, Shrestha continued her studies at Bryn Mawr College and Haverford College in the United States.

In 2007, she graduated magna cum laude from Bryn Mawr College with a Bachelor of Arts degree in Economics and Mathematics. Shrestha then enrolled at the MIT Sloan School of Management, where she earned her Master of Business Administration.

== Political career ==
=== Member of Parliament ===
On 14 December 2022, Sumana Shrestha was elected as a member of the House of Representatives of Nepal as a proportional representative. On 22 December 2022, she took her oath in Nepal Bhasa along with other representatives, thereby formally assuming her role in parliament.

Shrestha gained national recognition following her inaugural parliamentary address on 21 January 2023. In her speech, she introduced herself as a management consultant and advocated for the establishment of a parliamentary calendar to improve legislative efficiency. Her closing remarks—where she criticized fellow members for referring to women representatives as “cheli”—garnered significant attention and made national headlines. Additionally, CPN (UML) Chairperson KP Sharma Oli criticized her personal life and labeled her a “tourist minister,” alleging that she visited Nepal as a tourist after marrying a foreign citizen before assuming ministerial office.

Throughout her tenure, Shrestha has actively contributed to legislative reforms. On 15 February 2023, she proposed an amendment to the Food Hygiene and Quality Bill, 2077. Three days later, on 18 February 2023, she submitted a comprehensive set of 34 proposed amendments to the Federal Parliament Secretariat. These amendments emphasized expert participation in parliamentary committees, the streamlining of business procedures for enterprises, and the categorization of businesses based on their capital. Subsequently, on 22 February 2023, a bill to amend certain acts related to the Prevention of Money Laundering and the Promotion of Business Environment, 2079, was introduced in the House, against the backdrop of Nepal facing the risk of being greylisted by the Financial Action Task Force (FATF).

Shrestha resigned from her post on 9 September 2025 after government used unwarranted lethal force during brutal crackdown on Gen-Z protests.

=== Minister ===
Sumana Shrestha was appointed Minister of Education, Science and Technology in the coalition government led by Prime Minister Pushpa Kamal Dahal on 6 March 2024.

=== Departure from the Rastriya Swatantra Party (RSP) ===
In September 2025, Sumana Shrestha resigned from the Rastriya Swatantra Party (RSP), citing growing frustration with what she described as the party’s lack of internal democracy and accountability. In a public statement on 14 September 2025, she accused the leadership of fostering a culture where “the party stands above the country and the leader above the party,” and criticized what she called “media trials” of internal critics instead of open dialogue.

Prior to her departure, Shrestha had stepped down as the party’s Joint General Secretary in April 2025, arguing that RSP needed to adopt the principle of “one person, one position” and expressing dissatisfaction with limited internal consultation.

Her resignation came shortly after the controversy surrounding RSP chair Rabi Lamichhane’s release from custody during the Gen Z protests in Nepal. Shrestha publicly stated that the party’s role in pressuring prison officials for Lamichhane’s release was “wrong” and undermined rule of law, adding that RSP should not have “taken advantage of the Gen Z movement by claiming to be its stakeholder.”

Following her comments, Shrestha reportedly faced intense criticism and online harassment from RSP supporters and members aligned with Lamichhane. Some observers alleged that senior party figures such as Hari Dhakal and close associates of Lamichhane, including Deepak Bohora and Jwala Sangaula, used sympathetic media outlets, including Nikita Poudel’s channel Nari, to discredit her stance and question her loyalty to the party.

== Political agenda ==
=== Parliamentary calendar ===
Shrestha has been a vocal advocate for establishing a mandatory parliamentary calendar within the House of Representatives. She articulated her stance in an article published on 18 January 2023, emphasizing the critical role that good governance should play, beginning with the House itself. She has consistently authored media articles and participated in interviews to underscore the importance of such a calendar. On 30 January 2023, she took a proactive step by presenting a model format of the parliamentary calendar during a meeting of the Parliamentary Drafting Committee. Nearly two months later, on 22 March 2023, she further pursued her goal by submitting an amendment proposal to the House of Representatives Rules, 2079, advocating for the implementation of a mandatory parliamentary calendar; however, her proposal was ultimately rejected by the majority.

=== Education reform ===
Shrestha has consistently raised concerns on behalf of students regarding the Non-Objection Certificate from the Ministry of Education and the equivalence certificate from Tribhuvan University, both within parliamentary chambers and in public discussions. She introduced an amendment to streamline the equivalence procedures. Subsequently, Tribhuvan University revised its equivalence procedures to simplify the process for graduates from the top 500 universities, as ranked by the Times Higher Education Rankings.

=== Bill Hackathon ===
Shrestha has also advocated for the direct involvement of the general public in the legislative process. In an article published on 16 February 2023, she proposed the concept of a "Bill Hackathon" as a means to engage citizens more directly in lawmaking.

== See also ==
- Ujyaalo Nepal Party
