= Sasmit Pokharel =

Nepalese Minister of Education and Sports

- सस्मित पोखरेल

Minister of Education and Sports
- Incumbent
- Assumed office 14 May 2026
- President: Ram Chandra Paudel
- Prime Minister: Balendra Shah
- Preceded by: Position established
Other ministerial positions
Minister of Education, Science and Technology
In office 27 March 2026 – 14 May 2026
President	Ram Chandra Paudel
Prime Minister	Balendra Shah
Preceded by	Mahabir Pun
Succeeded by	Ministry dissolved (succeeded by Ministry of Education and Sports and Ministry of Science, Technology and Innovation)
Minister of Youth and Sports
In office 27 March 2026 – 14 May 2026
President	Ram Chandra Paudel
Prime Minister	Balendra Shah
Preceded by	Bablu Gupta
Succeeded by	Ministry dissolved (succeeded by Ministry of Education and Sports and Ministry of Youth, Labour and Employment)

Member of Parliament, Pratinidhi Sabha
- Incumbent
- Assumed office 26 March 2026
- Preceded by: Pradip Paudel
- Constituency: Kathmandu 5

Personal details
- Born: 14 March 1996 (age 30) Kathmandu, Nepal
- Party: Rastriya Swatantra Party
- Other political affiliations: Bibeksheel Sajha Party
- Spouse: Sushmita Adhikari
- Parent(s): Ramesh Kumar Pokharel (Father); Minakshi Ojha Pokharel (Mother)
- Education: BBM-LLB
- Alma mater: Oakton High School, Diablo Valley College, Kathmandu University School of Law (KUSOL)
- Website: sasmitpokharel.com

Sasmit Pokharel (Note: Nepali: सस्मित पोखरेल) (born 14 March 1996) is a Nepalese politician who has served as the Minister of Education and Sports since 2026. He is also the spokesperson of the Government of Nepal. He became a member of parliament after being elected from Kathmandu-5 constituency as a candidate of Rastriya Swatantra Party in the 2026 Nepalese general election. He is one of the youngest lawmakers in the 7th House of Representatives of Nepal.

== Early life and education ==
Born and raised in Kathmandu, Pokharel completed his early and secondary education from Oakton High School and Diablo Valley College, United States. He returned to Nepal to pursue a career in law, graduating with a Bachelor of Business Management and Bachelor of Laws (BBM-LL.B) from the Kathmandu University School of Law (KUSOL) and is currently pursuing a master's degree at Tribhuvan University in policy, governance and anti-corruption studies. Before entering formal politics, he was known as a political activist and a law student dedicated to systemic reform in Nepal.

== Political Career ==
Pokharel began his political journey at 18, inspired by Ujwal Thapa's Bibeksheel campaign, advocating for value-based politics and transparency. He was active in the Bibeksheel Sajha Party, serving as leader of the Sajha Youth Organization and a Central Committee member. After internal party changes, he continued independently and later joined the Rastriya Swatantra Party (RSP).

He first contested the 2022 provincial elections as an independent candidate from Kathmandu-5(A) but was unsuccessful. In the 2026 general elections, he ran under the RSP banner from Kathmandu-5 constituency, defeating prominent leaders including Nepali Congress General Secretary Pradeep Paudel, CPN-UML's Ishwar Pokharel, and RPP Chairman Kamal Thapa, securing 30,737 votes.

== Professional Experience ==
Before entering federal politics, Pokharel served as an Associate Expert in the City Planning Commission and as an Advisor on Education and Urban Planning under Kathmandu Metropolitan City Mayor Balen Shah. He contributed to drafting the mayoral manifesto and campaign strategy during the 2022 local elections.

He contributed on education sector of Kathmandu Metropolitan by installing smart boards in community schools to enhance digital learning, developing comprehensive school master plans for infrastructure and academic improvement, and launching the "Book Free Friday" program to promote project-based and experiential learning. He was also involved in improving school infrastructure and managing the "Earthquake Fund" collected from the Nepali diaspora in the United States following the 2015 earthquake, ensuring transparent use of resources for relief and reconstruction efforts.

== Ministerial Appointment ==
On March 27, 2026, following the formation of the new government led by Prime Minister Balendra Shah, Sasmit Pokharel was appointed Minister for Education, Science and Technology and Minister of Youth and Sports.

On May 13, 2026, following a major restructuring of the Government of Nepal, the Ministry of Education, Science and Technology was reorganized, resulting in a separation of portfolios. As part of this cabinet reshuffle, Pokharel continued as Minister for Education and Sports, while responsibilities related to science, technology, and innovation were reorganized under Ministry of Science, Technology and Innovation. The government also merged the Ministry of Youth and Sports into the Ministry of Youth, Labour and Employment, as part of broader administrative reforms aimed at improving coordination and efficiency across sectors.
