= Ministry of Youth and Sports (Nepal) =

Government ministry of Nepal

- Emblem of Nepal

Agency overview
- Dissolved: 13 May 2026
- Superseding agencies: Ministry of Education and Sports; Ministry of Youth, Labour and Employment
- Jurisdiction: Government of Nepal
- Headquarters: Singha Durbar, Kathmandu, Nepal
- Minister responsible: Sasmit Pokharel (last holder), Cabinet Minister
- Agency executive: Dr. Hari Prasad Lamsal, Secretary
- Website: moys.gov.np

The Ministry of Youth and Sports (Nepali: युवा तथा खेलकुद मन्त्रालय) was a government ministry of Nepal that governed the development of young people and sports in the country.

The ministry was dissolved and its two branches: Sports and Youth were merged with Ministry of Education and Sports and Ministry of Youth, Labour and Employment respectively as a part of administrative restructuring by Balendra Shah-led government under Nepal Government (Work Division) Regulations, 2083 on 13 May 2026.

== Organisational structure ==
- National Sports Council, Tripureshwor, Kathmandu
- Nepal Olympic Committee
- National Youth Council, Sanothimi, Bhaktapur
- Youth and Small Entrepreneur Self Employment Fund, Kupandol, Lalitpur
- Nepal Scouts, Lainchaur, Kathmandu
- National Anti-Doping Agency
- फाप्ला अन्तर्राष्ट्रिय क्रिकेट मैदान तथा खेलग्राम पूर्वाधार निर्माण विकास समिति, धनगढी कैलाली।

== See also ==
- Minister of Youth and Sports
