= Nikita Poudel =

Nepalese film producer

- निकिता पौडेल
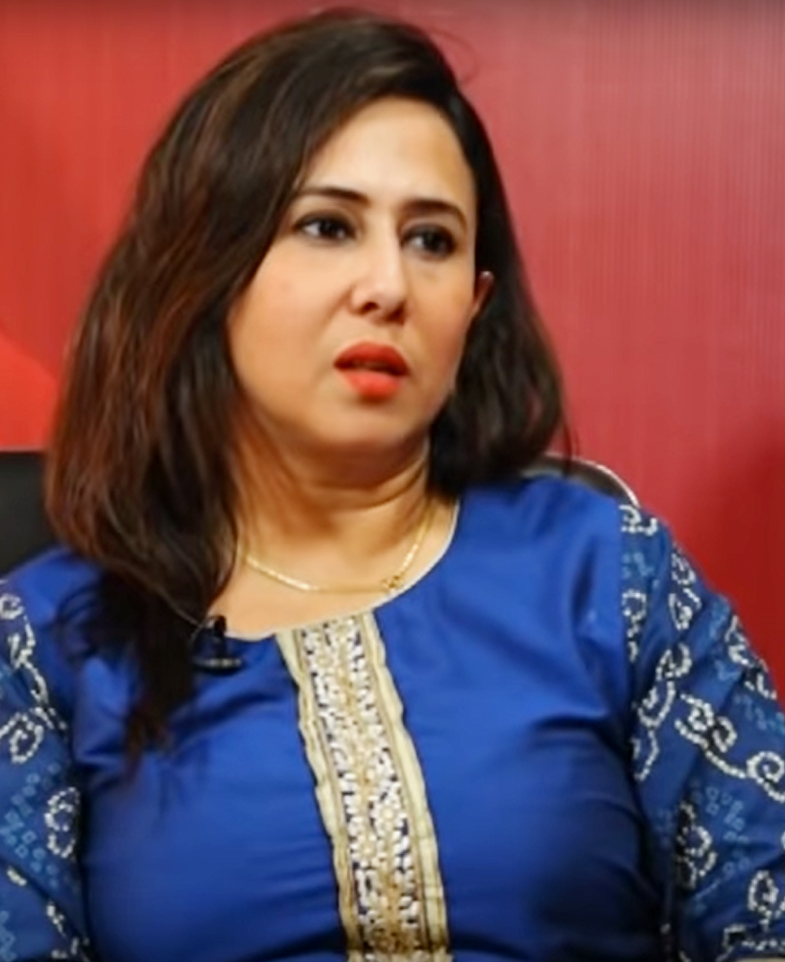
- Nikita Paudel in 2018
- Born: 31 December 1982 (age 43); Kathmandu, Nepal
- Spouses: Abhaya Shah (divorced) Rabi Lamichhane (m. 2019)
- Children: 1

Nikita Poudel (born 31 December 1982) is a Nepalese film producer and former chairperson of the Film Development Board.

== Career ==
Poudel has produced Kusume Rumal 2, Sundar Mero Naam, and Preeti Ko Phool. She became the first female to be chairperson of the Nepal Film Development Board on 15 December 2017. She resigned in February 2019 for violating the rules of the board. She is the daughter of Uddhav Poudel, owner of Gopi Krishna Movies, and comes from a filmmaking family.

=== Nari Television ===
Poudel is the chairman-owner of Nari Television, a media outlet based in Nepal focusing on content related to women and culture, including talk shows, news segments, and entertainment programs. The channel is backed by her father, Uddhav Poudel, a prominent leader of the Rastriya Prajatantra Party (RPP), and owner of Gopi Krishna Movies. Uddhav Poudel is considered part of Nepal's wealthy elite, and his financial support has been cited as a significant factor in the establishment and operations of Nari Television.

== Personal life ==
Poudel’s first marriage was to Abhaya Shah, with whom she has a daughter. In 2019, she married Rabi Lamichhane, a media personality and politician.
