= News 24 (Nepali TV channel) =

News24 Television
- Country: Nepal
- Broadcast area: Nepal; Worldwide
- Headquarters: Panipokhari, Kathmandu

Programming
- Languages: Nepali and partially Maithili
- Picture format: 4:3/16:9 (576i, SDTV)

History
- Launched: 2010

Links
- Website: Official Website

News24 Nepal is a news channel of Nepal owned by Nepal Broadcasting Channel Pvt. Ltd (NBC). News24 broadcasts 24/7.

== Current Programmes ==
- Sidha Kura Janatasanga (सिधा कुरा जनतासँग)
- Power News
- 24 Talk
- Red Alert
- Issue of the Day
- Digital Banking (Season 1-4)
- ETalk
- Aama
- Jiraha
