= Dhaniram Paudel =

Nepalese politician (died 2019)

Minister of Education, Science and Technology
- In office 14 August 2016 – 31 May 2017
- President: Bidhya Devi Bhandari
- Prime Minister: Pushpa Kamal Dahal
- Preceded by: Giriraj Mani Pokharel
- Succeeded by: Gopal Man Shrestha

Personal details
- Party: Communist Party of Nepal (Maoist Centre)

Dhaniram Paudel (1965/1966 – June 14, 2019) was a Nepalese politician.

Paudel was appointed Minister without Portfolio in the national government in August 2016, one of five new ministers appointed from the Communist Party of Nepal (Maoist Centre).

Paudel died on 14 June 2019 at his residence in Chitwan due to a heart attack.
