= Mahabir Pun =

Nepalese Minister of Science, Technology and Innovation

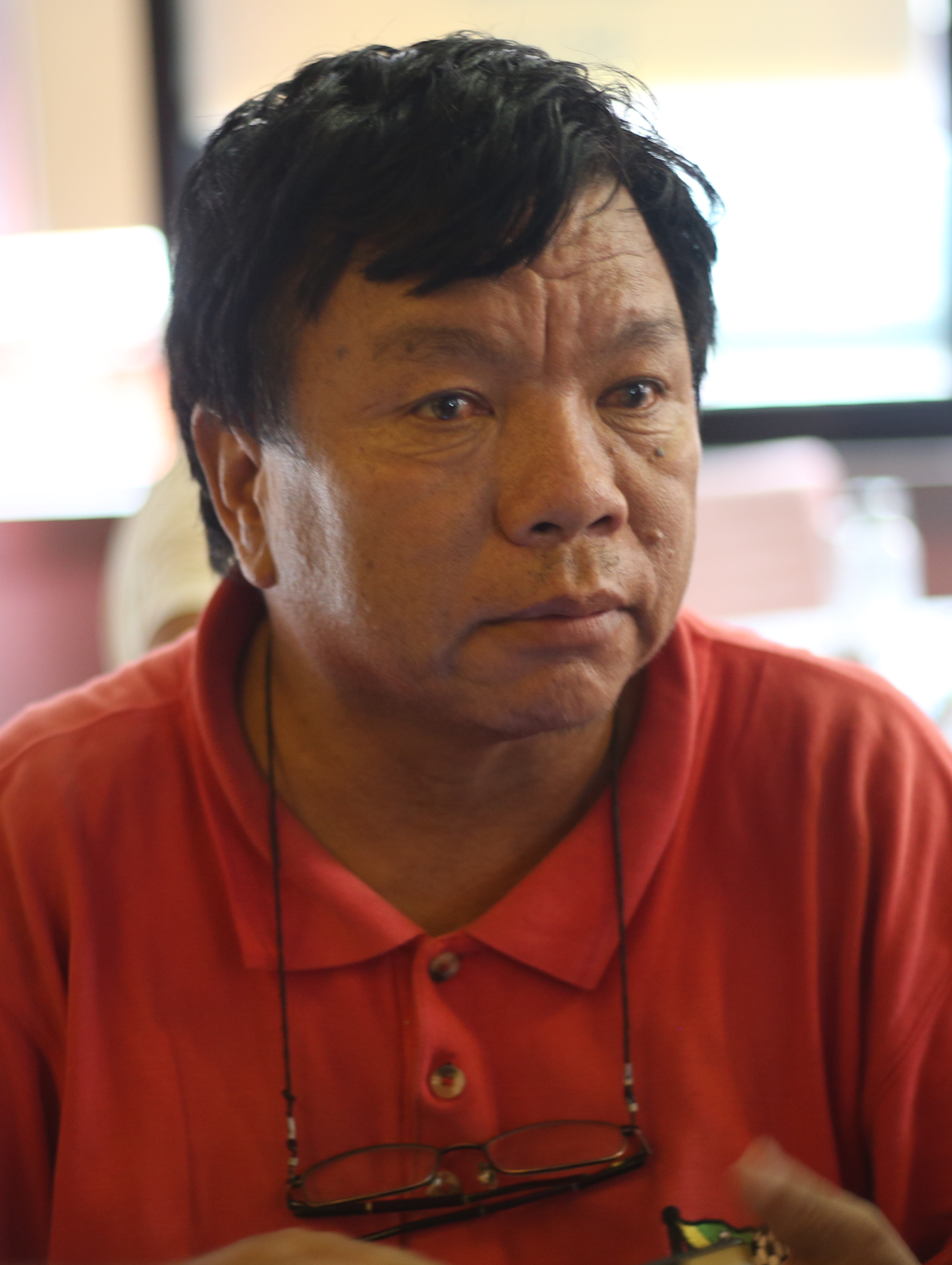

Minister of Science, Technology and Innovation
- Incumbent
- Assumed office 9 June 2026
- President: Ram Chandra Paudel
- Prime Minister: Balendra Shah
- Preceded by: Position established

Member of the Parliament, Pratinidhi Sabha
- Incumbent
- Assumed office 26 March 2026
- Preceded by: Kham Bahadur Garbuja
- Constituency: Myagdi 1

Minister of Education, Science and Technology
- In office 22 September 2025 – 20 January 2026
- Prime Minister: Sushila Karki (interim)
- Preceded by: Raghuji Pant
- Succeeded by: Sasmit Pokharel

Personal details
- Born: 22 January 1955 (age 71) Nangi, Myagdi, Kingdom of Nepal
- Party: Independent
- Education: University of Nebraska at Kearney (BSc); University of Nebraska–Lincoln
- Known for: Introducing Wireless Internet technology in remote areas of Nepal, National Innovation Center
- Awards: Ramon Magsaysay Award; Internet Hall of Fame; Jonathan B. Postel Service Award
- Website: nicnepal.org

Mahabir Pun (Note: Nepali: महावीर पुन, pronounced [maːbir pun];) (born 22 January 1955) is a Nepalese politician, researcher, social entrepreneur, and an activist. He has served as the Minister of Science, Technology and Innovation since 9 June 2026. A member of the House of Representatives representing Myagdi-1 constituency, he is the only independent candidate to win a seat in the 2026 general election. He previously served as the Minister of Education, Science and Technology in the interim government formed after 2025 Gen Z protests.

Pun is known for his work in applying wireless technologies to develop remote areas of the Himalayas, also known as the Nepal Wireless Networking Project. He is a widely known figure in Nepal, and his work has been recognised by the Ashoka Foundation, the Ramon Magsaysay Foundation, University of Nebraska at Kearney, and Global Ideas Bank.

== Early life and education ==
Mahabir Pun was born in a Magar family in Nangi, a remote village in the mountainous Myagdi District of western Nepal. He spent his childhood grazing cattle and sheep and attending a village school without paper, pencils, textbooks or qualified teachers. Traditionally, the local people had no education, and most men joined the British [Gurkha] army.

Mahabir Pun's life changed dramatically when his father, a retired Gurkha, moved the family to the southern plains of Nepal and invested their savings in his son's education. He passed his SLC in B.S. 2027 in 2nd division. After finishing high school, Pun worked as a teacher for about 13 years in four schools, while supporting his brothers' and sisters' education. In 1989, after numerous applications to UK and US universities, he succeeded in gaining a partial scholarship to the University of Nebraska at Kearney, from which he graduated in 1992 with a bachelor's degree in Science Education.

After graduation, he returned to his native village, twenty-four years after having left there as a child. It was in Nangi that he recognised the need for sustainable education and began to formulate his goal of creating a high school to serve as a model for local educational and economic development. Pun founded the Himanchal High School with a special focus on computer education and other programs with income-generating capacity. He then returned to the University of Nebraska–Lincoln for a master's degree in Educational Administration, which he completed in 2001.

In 2002 the aim of the project was to build a local communications network using wireless technology. The Project helped connect people in remote Himalayan communities with one another as well as the outside world. By 2006, through the Project, Pun was able to establish a Wi-Fi network to connect 13 mountainous villages to the Internet. The Project has now expanded to include over 175 remote villages in 15 districts of Nepal.

== Educational and economic development ==
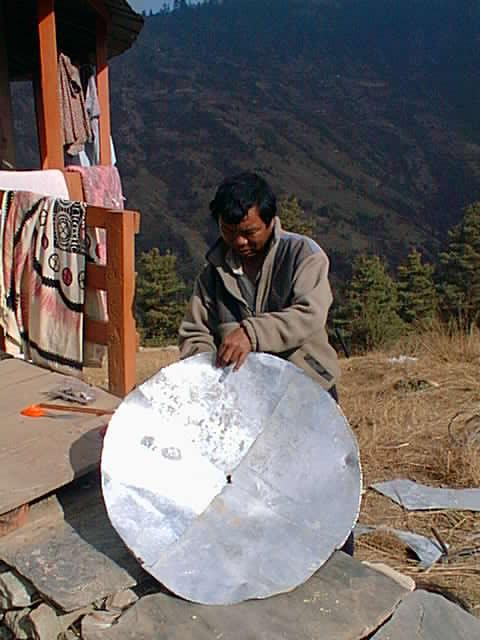
Mahabir Pun hand-making a satellite dish in Nepal

While in the United States of America, Pun had recognised that information technology had the potential to transform the education system and the economy of his village, and he had taken courses to acquire the skills needed to assemble, refurbish and use computers. On his return to Nepal, he campaigned for the donation of used computers from Japan, Malaysia, Australia, Singapore, and the US, and powered them with two small hydro generators (donated by Singaporean climbers on their way to Mount Everest) installed in a nearby stream. Pun began teaching computer classes to students and fellow teachers, but it proved impossible to establish a telephone connection to the nearest city, Pokhara, and the Internet. Pun e-mailed the BBC, asking for ideas. The BBC publicised his dilemma, and volunteers from Europe and the USA responded. In 2001, donors and volunteers helped him to rig a wireless connection between Nangi and the neighboring village of Ramche, using small handmade TV dish antennae mounted in trees. Small grants soon led to the construction of improvised mountaintop relay stations and a link to Pokhara. By 2003, Nangi had a wireless connection to the Internet. Later, Pun brought in more used computers donated from abroad, distributed them to other schools in other villages, and began work to develop a wireless distance-learning project supported by income-generating ventures.

Pun's work on distance learning and online educational services constitutes the first attempt in Nepal to address the scarcity of qualified teachers through technology. He took steps to ensure the success and growth of his projects, by arranging for other teachers to attend a computer training course in Pokhara, starting economic projects to fund students' expenses and teachers' salaries, and by attracting hundreds of international volunteers with wide-ranging skills. He has since built a new cultural centre, and has developed communication links for yak farmers, as well as new ventures to hc international trekking and tour groups.

== National Innovation Center ==
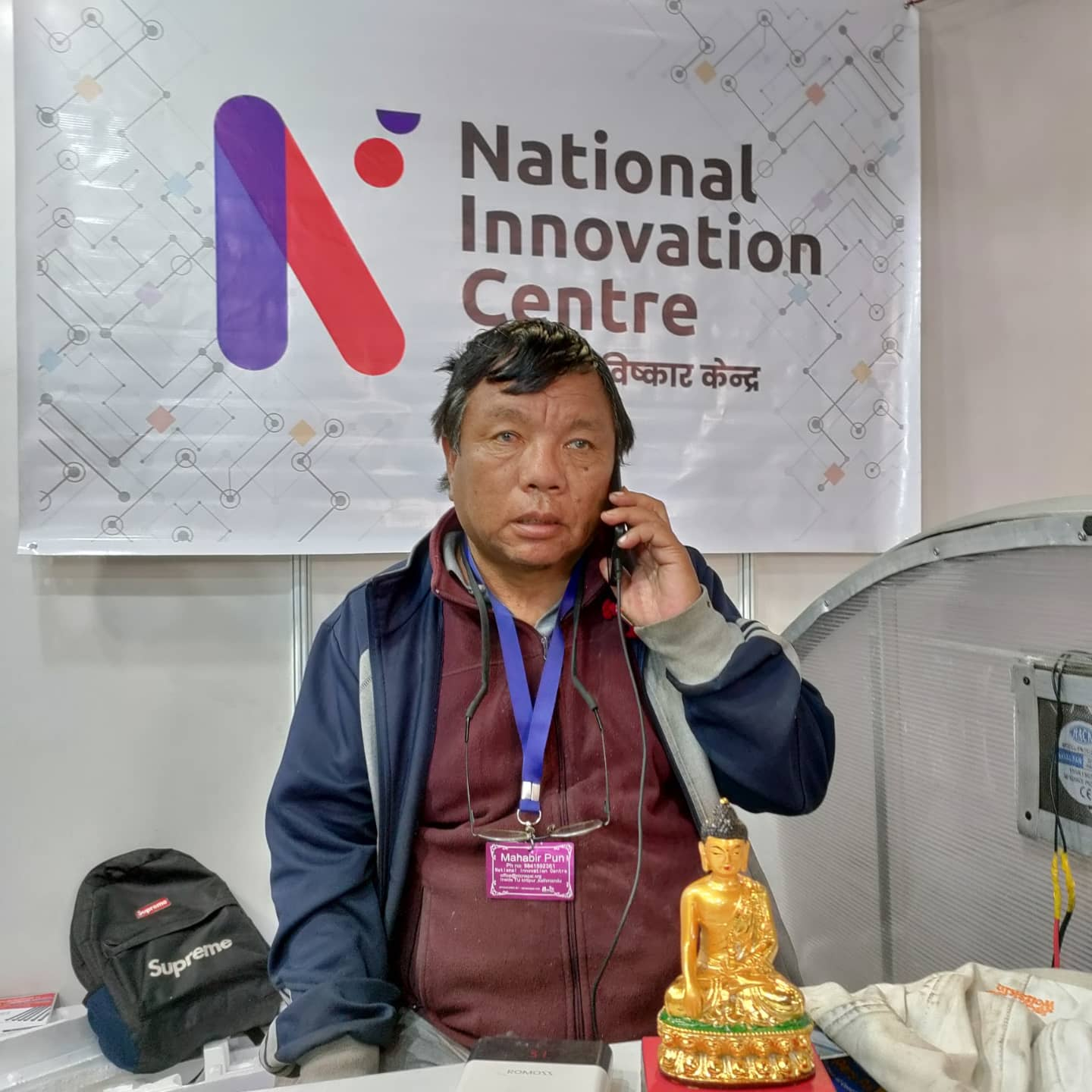
Mahabir Pun in 2021, Bharatpur, Nepal

Mahabir Pun led the initiative to register a nonprofit organization named Rashtriya Abiskar Kendra in 2012, often called National Innovation Center in English. The primary objective to establish the Innovation and invention center according to Mahabir Pun is to foster research and developments for the economic development of the country. Mahabir is running a crowd-funding campaign to fund National Innovation efforts. National Innovation Center crowd-funding campaign plans to collect build a 10MW hydropower station, which according to the initiative would sustainably fund its running cost. Mahabir has got social attraction with his donation of land for the National Innovation Center.

== Political career ==
After the 2025 Nepalese Gen Z protests, Pun was appointed a temporary Education, Science and Technology minister. Dharmaraj K.C. served him as a chief advisor and secretariat for the ministry. He served for the ministry until his resignation to contest the 2026 general election from Myagdi 1 constituency. He received 22,850 votes and won with a margin of 14,931 votes, officially making him the current member of parliament (MP) representing Myagdi 1.

On 9 June 2026, Pun was appointed the Minister of Science, Technology and Innovation in the government led by Prime Minister Balen Shah.

== Publications ==
In 2023, Mahabir Pun published a book in Nepali titled Mahabir Pun: Samjhana, Sapana ra Abiral Yatra (transl. "Mahabir Pun: Memories, Dreams and a Continuous Journey"). Published by the National Innovation Center, the 308-page book outlines Pun’s life journey from childhood, his struggle for education, rural internet expansion efforts, the founding of the National Innovation Center, and his continued service to the nation. The book is divided into 18 chapters.

The publication played a key role in a nationwide campaign to raise awareness and funding for innovation in Nepal. Through the sale of this book, over NPR 30 million was raised. Local governments, including Hetauda Sub-Metropolitan City, purchased hundreds of copies for distribution. The campaign also increased pressure on the government to support innovation initiatives.

== International recognition ==
In 2002, Pun was elected Ashoka Fellow by the Ashoka Foundation, the association of social entrepreneurs. The Foundation noted Pun's contribution to overcoming the geographical isolation of many of the communities in which he works, with a new idea which could be replicated in other geographically isolated areas with few educational or economic opportunities.

In 2004, Pun received the Overall Social Innovations Award from the Global Ideas Bank, aka the Institute for Social Inventions. They said, "Using an inspired mix of solar power, tree-based relay systems, and wireless technology, the project is helping yak farmers stay in touch, families communicate and, with an expansion into distance learning, children to gain the education.

In 2007, Pun was awarded the Magsaysay Award in recognition of "his innovative application of wireless computer technology in Nepal, bringing progress to remote mountain areas by connecting his village to the global village". Pun is one of five Nepalis to receive the Magsaysay Award, and the only one to receive the Magsaysay Award for Community Leadership.

Later in 2007, the University of Nebraska–Lincoln awarded Pun an honorary degree as Doctor of Humane Letters for his outstanding work for his country, Nepal.

Pun was inducted into the Internet Hall of Fame in 2014.

In 2014 Pun was awarded the Jonathan B. Postel Service Award by the Internet Society.

In 2021 Pun announced a television show, Aaviskar, on Nepal's first 4K TV channel Galaxy 4K.
