= Film Development Board =

Governing-body responsible for distribution of films in Nepal

Film Development Board (FDB)
- Native name: चलचित्र विकास बोर्ड
- Industry: Cinema of Nepal
- Founded: 30 June 2000 (26 years ago)
- Headquarters: Kapan, Kathmandu, Nepal, Nepal
- Area served: Nepal
- Key people: Dinesh D.C., Chairperson
- Products: Films
- Owner: Ministry of Information and Communications
- Number of employees: 27
- Parent: Nepal Government
- Website: film.gov.np

The Film Development Board is a government body responsible for the development and promotion of motion picture sector in Nepal. The board is under the Ministry of Information and Communication Nepal.

The highest-grossing Nepali movie of all time worldwide is Purna Bahadur Ko Sarangi (2024), which made history by collecting over रू72.60 crore globally.

Nepali cinema has seen massive exponential box office growth, driven by unprecedented domestic ticket sales and rapidly expanding international markets (primarily in Australia, the US, the UK, and the Middle East).

Because complete global box office breakdowns are occasionally estimated differently across international distributors, the following list ranks the top performing films based on the latest available Film Development Board (FDB) tracking and consolidated global collections:

== History ==
Film Development Board (FDB) was established on 30 June 2000 by the Government of Nepal according to the Clause 10a of Motion Picture (Production, Exhibition and Distribution) Act amended on 20 November 1991 with the mandate of first, look after the research, planning and development, production, library and archive, film festivals and international relations. Second, distribution, exhibition and monitoring and supervision of the films produced for the commercial purpose.

== List of Chairperson ==
S.N	Name	Tenure
1	Dinesh D.C.	29 Aug 2024 - Present
2	Bhuwan K.C.	25 Jul 2022 to 24 Jul 2024
3	Dayaram Dahal	4 Jun 2020 to 3 Jun 2022
4	Late. Keshab Bhattarai	18 Mar 2019 to 15 Dec 2019
5	Nikita Poudel	15 Dec 2017 to 9 Feb 2019
6	Ram Chandra Dhakal	21 Aug 2017 to 14 Dec 2017
7	Raj Kumar Rai	8 Jun 2015 to 7 Jun 2017
8	Dharmendra Morbaita	30 Jan 2013 to 30 Jan 2015
9	Ganesh Bhandari	26 May 2011 to 18 Oct 2012
10	Amar Giri	1 Jul 2009 to 15 Mar 2011
11	Ishwar Chandra Gyawali	22 Aug 2007 to 22 Aug 2008
12	Sailesh Raj Acharya	31 Jul 2007 to 21 Aug 2007
13	Krishna Malla	26 Dec 2006 to 7 May 2007
14	Sambhujeet Baskota	22 Apr 2004 to 25 Dec 2006
15	Mukunda Prasad Acharya	14 Nov 2002 to 21 Apr 2004
16	Neer Shah	18 Apr 2002 to 28 Oct 2002
17	Yadav Kharel	30 Jun 2000 to 12 Apr 2002

== See also ==
- Cinema of Nepal
