= National Examination Board (Nepal) =

Examinations Board of Nepal

Agency overview
- Formed: 2016
- Jurisdiction: Nepal
- Headquarters: Sanothimi, Bhaktapur, Nepal
- Minister responsible: Minister of Education and Sports
- Agency executive: Dr. Mahashram Sharma, Chief Executive Officer
- Website: neb.gov.np

National Examinations Board (Nepali: राष्ट्रिय परीक्षा बोर्ड), commonly abbreviated as NEB, is a board that organizes the secondary examinations and education in Nepal. It is responsible for conducting and managing 12th grade board exams (SLC), and 10th grade Secondary Education Examination (SEE). It is transformed from previous Higher Secondary Education Board (HSEB) after the Education Act (8th amendment) of 2073 BS was implemented.

The jurisdiction of the previous Higher Secondary Education Board (HSEB) was limited to 11th and 12th-grade high school (10+2) only. HSEB was established in 1989 under the Higher Secondary Education Act.

National Examinations Board currently has its provincial offices in all 7 Provinces of Nepal located at Morang, Janakpur, Kathmandu, Pokhara, Butwal, Birendranagar and Dhangadi. The board also has branch offices at Lahan, Hetauda, Ghorahi, Kohalpur and Dadeldhura.

== See also ==
- School Leaving Certificate
- District Level Examination
- Secondary Education Examination
