= Giriraj Mani Pokharel =

Nepali politician

Giriraj Mani Pokhrel
- गिरिराजमणि पोखरेल
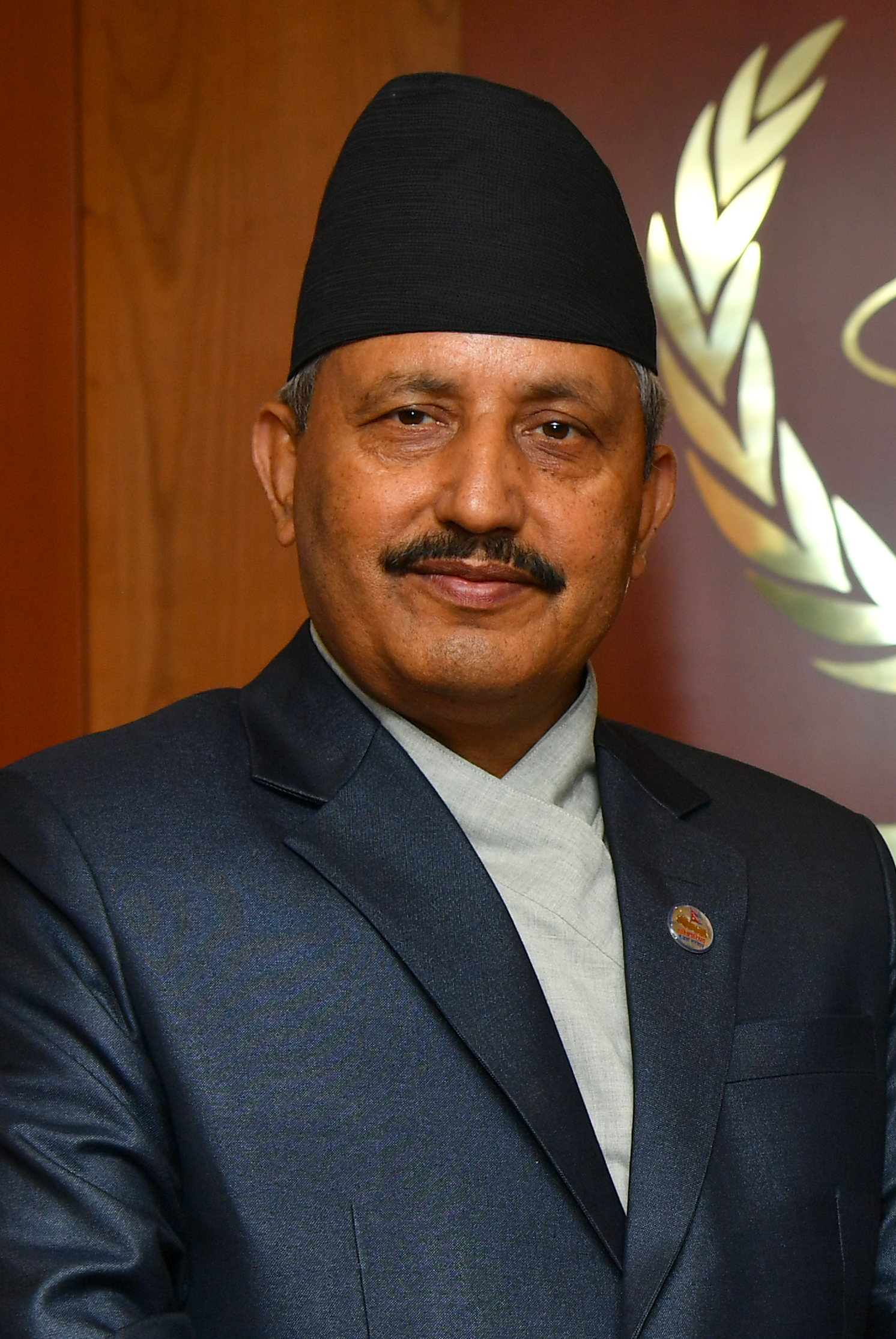
- Giriraj Mani Pokharel in 2018

Minister of Education, Science and Technology
- In office 16 March 2018 – 20 December 2020
- President: Bidhya Devi Bhandari
- Prime Minister: Khadga Prasad Sharma Oli
- Preceded by: Chitra Lekha Yadav
- Succeeded by: Dhaniram Paudel

Minister of Health and Population
- In office 29 April 2007 – 4 May 2009
- Prime Minister: Pushpa Kamal Dahal

Member of Parliament, Pratinidhi Sabha
- Incumbent
- Assumed office 4 March 2018
- Preceded by: Himself (as MCA)
- Constituency: Mahottari 1

Member of Constituent Assembly
- In office 28 May 2008 – 14 October 2017
- Preceded by: Mahendra Yadav (as MP)
- Succeeded by: Himself (as MP)
- Constituency: Mahottari 1

Personal details
- Born: 6 March 1958 (age 68) Khotang, Nepal
- Party: CPN (Maoist Centre) (since 2009)
- Other political affiliations: CPN (Fourth Convention) (until 1990); Samyukta Janamorcha (1990–2002); Janamorcha Nepal (2002–2009)
- Profession: Politician
- Website: girirajmanipokharel.com

Giriraj Mani Pokharel is a Nepalese politician and the former Minister of Education and Health. He is also the deputy Secretary of the Unified Communist Party of Nepal (Maoist) and was a member of the Constituent Assembly. He serves as the founding chairman of the Adharshila organisation.

== Political life ==
On April 12, 2007, Janamorcha Nepal, of which he was then a vice-chairman, nominated him as the new Minister of Health. Pokharel was appointed to the said position on April 29, 2007. In April 2008, he won the Mahottari-1 seat in the Constituent Assembly election as a candidate of Janamorcha Nepal (People's Front Nepal). He then served a second term as Minister of Health and Population, in the government formed under the leadership of the Communist Party of Nepal (Maoist) after it won the most seats in the Constituent Assembly election.

Pokharel's second term as Minister of Health and Population was from 31 August 2008 until 4 May 2009, when then Prime Minister Pushpa Kamal Dahal (Prachanda) resigned along with his cabinet and dissolved the government. Pokharel began his second term as the sole representative in the government of his party Janamorcha Nepal. However, in January 2009, Janamorcha Nepal and its parent party, the Communist Party of Nepal (Unity Centre) united with the Communist Party of Nepal to become the Unified Communist Party of Nepal (Maoist). Pokharel completed his second term as Minister of Health and Population as a representative of the Unified Communist Party of Nepal (Maoist).

After the unification of the two parties, Pokharel was elected to the party's Standing Committee. He is also in-charge of the party's Health Department.
