= Basic Level Examination (Nepal) =

Final exam of Grade 8 in Nepal

Examination Board for Grade 8 in Nepal
- Predecessor: District Level Examinations (DLE)

The Basic Level Examination (BLE) (Nepali: आधारभूत तह परीक्षा), also known as the Basic Education Examination (BEE), is the final examination of basic education; Grade 8 in Nepal conducted at the municipal level. The examination was previously known as the District Level Examination (DLE), as it used to be conducted at the district level.

The examination is conducted annually, usually in March, by local governments such as municipalities and metropolitan cities across Nepal.

== Subjects ==
There are various subjects in Basic Level. Among them some are compulsory and optional.

=== Compulsory Subjects ===
Some of the compulsory subjects in the examination are:

- Nepali
- English
- Science and Technology
- Mathematics
- Social Studies and Human Value Education
- Health Physical Education And Creative Art
- Local Subject ( Eg Hamro Gaurab Hamro Bharatpur, Hamro Gaurab Hamro Pokhara , Etc )

=== Optional Subjects ===
Some of the optional subjects are:

- Sanskrit
- Extra English and other languages
- Computer Education/ Science
- Geography and History Education
- Optional Mathematics
- Business Education
- Technology Education
- Office Practice and Accountancy
- Nepal Bhasa

== See also ==
- Education in Nepal
