= Ministry of Science, Technology and Innovation (Nepal) =

Federal Ministry in Nepal

- विज्ञान, प्रविधि तथा नवप्रवर्तन मन्त्रालय
- Emblem of Nepal

Ministry overview
- Formed: 13 May 2026; 4 months ago
- Preceding Ministry: Ministry of Education, Science and Technology
- Jurisdiction: Government of Nepal
- Headquarters: Singha Durbar, Kathmandu, Nepal
- Minister responsible: Mahabir Pun, Minister for Science, Technology and Innovation
- Ministry executive: Dinanath Mishra, Secretary
- Child agencies: Nepal Academy of Science and Technology (NAST); Department of Forensic Science; Planetarium, Observatory and Science Museum
- Website: www.mosti.gov.np

The Ministry of Science, Technology and Innovation (Nepali: विज्ञान, प्रविधि तथा नवप्रवर्तन मन्त्रालय, abbreviated as MoSTI) is a federal ministry of Nepal responsible for overseeing scientific research, technological advancement, and innovation policies across the nation.

The ministry was established on May 13, 2026, when the Balendra Shah government reorganized the federal executive from a 22-ministry structure to an 18-ministry system under the revised Nepal Government (Work Division) Regulations, 2083. It was split from the former Ministry of Education, Science and Technology to establish a dedicated focus on high-tech development, digital transformation, artificial intelligence (AI) integration, and domestic research and development (R&D).

== Organizational Structure ==
The executive leadership of the ministry consists of the Minister for Science, Technology and Innovation, supported by the Secretary (राजपत्राङ्कित विशिष्ट श्रेणी). The internal administrative structure is divided into three major divisions (महाशाखा) headed by Joint Secretaries (सहसचिव), which are further organized into specialised branches (शाखा) and affiliated agencies:

=== Policy, Planning and Resource Mobilization Division ===
(नीति, योजना तथा स्रोत परिचालन महाशाखा)

- Policy and Planning Branch (नीति तथा योजना शाखा)
- Monitoring, Evaluation and Statistics Branch (अनुगमन, मूल्यांकन तथा तथ्याङ्क शाखा)
- Resource Mobilization Branch (स्रोत परिचालन शाखा)
- Technology Promotion and Transfer Branch (प्रविधि प्रवर्धन तथा हस्तान्तरण शाखा)
- Scientific Talent Exploration and Capacity Building Branch (वैज्ञानिक प्रतिभा खोज तथा क्षमता विकास शाखा)
- Entrepreneurship and Intellectual Property Promotion Branch (उद्यमशीलता तथा बौद्धिक सम्पत्ति संवर्धन शाखा)
- Nepali Diaspora, Foreign and Inter-Body Coordination Branch (नेपाली डायस्पोरा, वैदेशिक तथा अन्तर निकाय समन्वय शाखा)

=== Science, Technology, Research and Innovation Division ===
(विज्ञान, प्रविधि, अनुसन्धान तथा नवप्रवर्तन महाशाखा)

- Scientific Research Branch (वैज्ञानिक अनुसन्धान शाखा)
- Appropriate and Emerging Technology Promotion Branch (उपयुक्त तथा उदयीमान प्रविधि शाखा)
- Laboratory, Chemical Substances Management, Quality Standard Branch (प्रयोगशाला, रासायनिक पदार्थ व्यवस्थापन, गुणस्तर मापदण्ड शाखा)
- Permit, Regulation and Radiation Safety Branch (अनुमति, नियमन तथा विकिरण सुरक्षा शाखा)
- Information Technology Branch (सूचना प्रविधि शाखा)

=== Administration Division ===
(प्रशासन महाशाखा)

- Administration and Security Management Branch (प्रशासन तथा सुरक्षा व्यवस्थापन शाखा)
- Law and Decision Execution Branch (कानुन तथा फैसला कार्यान्वयन शाखा)
- Financial Administration Branch (आर्थिक प्रशासन शाखा)

=== Subordinate and Affiliated Bodies ===
The ministry directly oversees and coordinates with the following specialized entities:

- Nepal Academy of Science and Technology (नेपाल विज्ञान तथा प्रविधि प्रज्ञा-प्रतिष्ठान)
- https://www.forensic.gov.np/ (विधि विज्ञान प्रतिष्ठान)
- Planetarium, Observatory and Science Museum Board (प्लैनेटेरियम, वेधशाला र विज्ञान सङ्ग्रहालय)

== Key Functions and Digital Services ==
MoSTI is tasked with driving Nepal's national innovation agenda, including legislative drafting for the sector. Primary operations and digital services managed by the ministry include:

- Legislative & Policy Reform: Drafting and updating key legislation, including the integrated Science, Technology and Innovation Bill and modernizing the Nepal Academy of Science and Technology (NAST) Act, 2048.
- STI Chautari (प्रविधि चौतारी): A portal designed for scientific engagement, public feedback, and idea exchange among researchers, innovators, and the government.
- Integrated Government Digital Systems: Managing administrative portals such as the Integrated Office Management System (IOMS), Public Asset Management System (PAMS), Gatepass services, and secure civil service communication networks.
