= Balen Shah cabinet =

Government of Nepal since 2026

- 38th Council of Ministers of Nepal
- 2026–present
- Date formed: 27 March 2026

People and organisations
- President: Ram Chandra Paudel
- Prime Minister: Balen Shah
- No. of ministers: 17 (including Prime Minister)
- Ministers removed: 1 resigned 1 dismissed
- Total no. of members: 17
- Member parties: Rastriya Swatantra Party Independent
- Status in legislature: Majority
- Opposition cabinet: Parliamentary Monitoring Committee
- Opposition party: Nepali Congress
- Opposition leader: Bhishma Raj Angdembe

History
- Incoming formation: 7th House of Representatives
- Election: 2026
- Legislature term: 236 days
- Budget: 2026
- Predecessor: Karki interim cabinet

The Balen Shah cabinet is the incumbent council of ministers of Nepal since 27 March 2026. It is headed by Prime Minister Balendra Shah and was formed following the 2026 general election that saw his Rastriya Swatantra Party win in a landslide victory. The election results were announced and submitted to the president on 19 March 2026, leading to the formation of the 7th House of Representatives. The cabinet, along with the prime minister, was sworn in on 27 March 2026, eight days after the results were submitted.

== History ==
On April 9 2026, Minister Dipak Kumar Sah was sacked for disciplinary breach. On September 10 2026, Minister Gauri Kumari Yadav resigned due to her controversial statement regarding gas industrialists.

== Cabinet ministers ==
S.N.	Portfolio	Minister	Portrait	Tenure			Party
Cabinet Ministers
1	Prime Minister^{Minister of Defence}	Balen Shah		27 March 2026	Incumbent	235 days	RSP
2	Minister of Finance	Swarnim Wagle		27 March 2026	Incumbent	235 days	RSP
3	Minister of Foreign Affairs	Shisir Khanal		27 March 2026	Incumbent	235 days	RSP
4	Minister of Energy, Water Resources and Irrigation	Biraj Bhakta Shrestha		27 March 2026	Incumbent	235 days	RSP
5	Minister of Home Affairs	Sudan Gurung		27 March 2026	22 April 2026	26 days	RSP
5	Minister of Home Affairs	Sudan Gurung		9 June 2026	Incumbent	161 days	RSP
6	Minister of Infrastructure Development	Sunil Lamsal		27 March 2026	Incumbent	235 days	RSP
7	Minister of Law, Justice and Parliamentary Affairs	Sobita Gautam		27 March 2026	Incumbent	235 days	RSP
8	Minister of Science, Technology and Innovation	Mahabir Pun		9 June 2026	Incumbent	161 days	Independent
9	Minister of Women, Children, Gender and Sexual Minorities and Social Security	Sita Badi		27 March 2026	Incumbent	235 days	RSP
10	Minister of Land Management, Cooperatives, Federal Affairs and General Administration	Pratibha Rawal		27 March 2026	Incumbent	235 days	RSP
11	Minister of Health and Food Hygiene	Nisha Mehta		27 March 2026	Incumbent	235 days	RSP
12	Minister of Education and Sports	Sasmit Pokharel		27 March 2026	Incumbent	235 days	RSP
13	Minister of Culture, Tourism and Civil Aviation	Khadak Raj Paudel		27 March 2026	Incumbent	235 days	RSP
14	Minister of Information and Communication	Bikram Timilsina		27 March 2026	Incumbent	235 days	RSP
15	Minister of Agriculture, Forests and Environment	Gita Chaudhary		27 March 2026	Incumbent	235 days	RSP
16	Minister of Youth, Labour and Employment	Ramjee Yadav		10 April 2026	Incumbent	221 days	RSP
17	Minister of Industry, Commerce and Supplies	Deepak Kumar Sah		10 September 2026	Incumbent	68 days	RSP
Former Ministers
—	Minister of Labour, Employment and Social Security	Dipak Kumar Sah		27 March 2026	9 April 2026	13 days	RSP
—	Minister of Industry, Commerce and Supplies	Gauri Kumari Yadav		10 April 2026	10 September 2026	153 days	RSP

== See also ==
- Council of Ministers of Nepal
- Government of Nepal
