= Constitution of Nepal (Second Amendment 2077) Bill =

2nd amendment of the Constitution of Nepal

Nepal Constitution (second amendment) Bill-2077 BS

Parliament of Nepal
- Territorial extent: Nepal
- Passed by: House of Representatives
- Passed: 13 June 2020
- Passed by: National Assembly
- Passed: 18 June 2020
- Assented to by: President Bidya Devi Bhandari
- Assented to: 18 June 2020

Legislative history

Initiating chamber: House of Representatives
- Bill title: Nepal Constitution (second amendment) Bill-2077 BS
- Introduced by: Minister of Law, Justice and Parliamentary Affairs, Shiva Maya Tumbahamphe
- Introduced: 24 May 2020
- Voting summary: 258 voted for; None voted against; None abstained; 17 absent

Revising chamber: National Assembly
- Bill title: Nepal Constitution (second amendment) Bill-2077 BS
- Received from the House of Representatives: 13 June 2020
- Passed: 18 June 2020
- Voting summary: 57 voted for; None voted against; None abstained
- Status: In force

The Constitution of Nepal (Second Amendment 2077) Act provided the legal status to a new map of Nepal to be used in the country's national emblem by amending Schedule 3 (Coat of Arms) in the Constitution of Nepal. The Council of Ministers of Nepal had announced the new map on 20 May 2020 and two days later it was placed in the Parliament. On 13 June 2020, the motion was put forth for voting in the lower house of Nepal's Parliament by the government of Prime Minister KP Sharma Oli. Voting was unanimous with ayes being 258 with no nays. On 18 June 2020, the Upper House unanimously passed the Bill after which the President of Nepal Bidhya Devi Bhandari signed the Bill.

The new map places Limpiyadhura, Lipulekh and Kalapani as territory under Nepal. Nepal claims the area as per the Treaty of Sugauli and claims that India was granted permission for troop movement in the area in the 1950s, but since then India has refused to move them back. The move also comes ahead of the Prime Minister of Nepal facing calls to step down, and days after India opened a road through Lipulekh to Lake Mansarovar in the Tibet Autonomous Region of China. In November 2019 India had issued a new map in which Kalapani, a disputed territory according to Nepal, was shown as Indian territory. The map showed the regions as part of Uttarakhand.

== See also ==
- Constituition of Nepal
- Parliament of Nepal
