= Minister of Land Management, Cooperatives and Poverty Alleviation =

Head of the Ministry of Land Management, Cooperatives and Poverty Alleviation

- भूमि व्यवस्था,सहकारी तथा गरिबी निवारण मन्त्री
- Emblem of Nepal

- Flag of Nepal
- Incumbent; Pratibha Rawal since 27 March 2026
- Ministry of Land Management, Cooperatives and Poverty Alleviation
- Style: Honourable
- Member of: Council of Ministers
- Reports to: Prime Minister, Parliament
- Seat: Singha Durbar, Nepal
- Nominator: Prime Minister
- Appointer: President
- Term length: No fixed term
- Precursor: Minister of Agriculture, Land Management and Cooperatives

The Minister of Land Management, Cooperatives and Poverty Alleviation (Nepali: भूमि व्यवस्था,सहकारी तथा गरिबी निवारण मन्त्री) is the head of the Ministry of Land Management, Cooperatives and Poverty Alleviation of the Government of Nepal. One of the senior-most officers in the Federal Cabinet, the minister is responsibility to establish good governance by upgrading judicial access, feeling of security of land ownership, and effectiveness of service effluence in country.

The current minister is Pratibha Rawal who took office on 27 March 2026 and she concurrently holds an additional ministerial responsibility, following the formation of the new government under Prime Minister Balendra Shah.

== List of former ministers ==
| # | Name | Took of office | | | Prime Minister | Minister's Party |
|---|---|---|---|---|---|---|
| 1 | Padma Kumari Aryal | 3 August 2018 | 25 December 2020 | 875 | KP Sharma Oli | CPN (UML) |
| 2 | Shiva Maya Tumbahamphe | 25 December 2020 | 4 June 2021 | 161 | KP Sharma Oli | CPN (UML) |
| 3 | Laxman Lal Karna | 4 June 2021 | 22 June 2021 | 18 | KP Sharma Oli | PSP-N |
| 4 | Lila Nath Shrestha | 24 June 2021 | 12 July 2021 | 18 | KP Sharma Oli | CPN (UML) |
| – | Sher Bahadur Deuba | 13 July 2021 | 8 October 2021 | 87 | Sher Bahadur Deuba | Nepali Congress |
| 5 | Shashi Shrestha | 8 October 2021 | 26 December 2022 | 444 | Sher Bahadur Deuba | CPN (Maoist Centre) |
| 6 | Rajendra Kumar Rai | 26 December 2022 | 27 February 2023 | 63 | Pushpa Kamal Dahal | CPN (UML) |
| – | Pushpa Kamal Dahal | 27 February 2023 | 31 March 2023 | 32 | Pushpa Kamal Dahal | CPN (Maoist Centre) |
| 7 | Ranjeeta Shrestha | 31 March 2023 | 4 March 2024 | 341 | Pushpa Kamal Dahal | NUP |
| – | Pushpa Kamal Dahal | 4 March 2024 | 6 March 2024 | 2 | Pushpa Kamal Dahal | CPN (Maoist Centre) |
| 8 | Balaram Adhikari | 6 March 2024 | 3 July 2024 | 119 | Pushpa Kamal Dahal | CPN (UML) |
| – | Pushpa Kamal Dahal | 4 July 2024 | 15 July 2024 | 12 | Pushpa Kamal Dahal | CPN (Maoist Centre) |
| 9 | Balaram Adhikari | 15 July 2024 | 11 September 2025 | 423 | K. P. Sharma Oli | CPN (UML) |
| – | Sushila Karki | 12 September 2025 | 22 September 2025 | 361 | Sushila Karki | Independent |
| 10 | Anil Kumar Sinha | 22 September 2025 | 12 December 2025 | 91 | Sushila Karki | Independent |
| 11 | Kumar Ingnam | 12 December 2025 | 27 March 2026 | 105 | Sushila Karki | Independent |
| 12 | Pratibha Rawal | 27 March 2026 | Incumbent | 165 | Balendra Shah | Rastriya Swatantra Party |
