= Minister of Federal Affairs and General Administration =

Head of the Ministry of Federal Affairs and General Administration

- सङ्घीय मामिला तथा सामान्य प्रशासन मन्त्री
- Emblem of Nepal

- Flag of Nepal
- Incumbent; Pratibha Rawal since 27 March 2026
- Ministry of Federal Affairs and General Administration
- Style: Honourable
- Member of: Council of Ministers
- Reports to: Prime Minister, Parliament
- Seat: Singha Durbar, Nepal
- Nominator: Prime Minister
- Appointer: President
- Term length: No fixed term
- Precursor: Minister of Federal Affairs and Local Development; Minister of General Administration

The Minister of Federal Affairs and General Administration (Nepali: सङ्घीय मामिला तथा सामान्य प्रशासन मन्त्री) is the head of the Ministry of Federal Affairs and General Administration of the Government of Nepal. One of the senior-most officers in the Federal Cabinet, the minister is responsibility for coordination, cooperation, facilitation and monitoring and evaluation of activities undertaken by local governments; regulation and management of the civil service in the country.

The current minister is Pratibha Rawal who took office on 27 March 2026, and she concurrently holds an additional ministerial responsibility.

== List of former ministers ==
Nepali Congress CPN (Unified Marxist–Leninist)
CPN (Maoist Centre)
People's Socialist Party, Nepal
People's Progressive Party, Nepal Independent

#	Name	Took of office			Prime Minister	Minister's Party
1	Lal Babu Pandit	16 March 2018	20 March 2019	369	KP Sharma Oli	CPN (UML)
2	Hridayesh Tripathi	21 November 2019	25 December 2020	400	KP Sharma Oli	PPP-N
2	Hridayesh Tripathi	21 November 2019	25 December 2020	400	KP Sharma Oli	CPN (UML)
3	Ganesh Singh Thagunna	25 December 2020	4 June 2021	161	KP Sharma Oli	CPN (UML)
4	Ganesh Kumar Pahadi	10 June 2021	22 June 2021	12	KP Sharma Oli	CPN (UML)
5	Lilanath Shrestha	24 June 2021	11 July 2021	17	KP Sharma Oli	CPN (UML)
–	Sher Bahadur Deuba	13 July 2021	8 October 2021	87	Sher Bahadur Deuba	Nepali Congress
6	Rajendra Prasad Shrestha	8 October 2021	14 October 2022	371	Sher Bahadur Deuba	PSP-N
–	Pushpa Kamal Dahal	26 December 2022	17 January 2023	22	Puspha Kamal Dahal	CPN (Maoist Centre)
7	Aman Lal Modi	17 January 2023	14 August 2023	209	Puspha Kamal Dahal	CPN (Maoist Centre)
8	Anita Devi Sah	14 August 2023	4 March 2024	203	Puspha Kamal Dahal	Janamat Party
–	Pushpa Kamal Dahal	4 March 2024	6 March 2024	2	Puspha Kamal Dahal	CPN (MC)
9	Bhanu Bhakta Joshi	6 March 2024	15 July 2024	131	Puspha Kamal Dahal	CPN (Unified Socialist)
10	Raj Kumar Gupta	15 July 2024	15 July 2025	365	KP Sharma Oli	CPN (UML)
11	Bhagwati Neupane	15 July 2025	11 September 2025	58	KP Sharma Oli	CPN (UML)
–	Sushila Karki	12 September 2025	22 September 2025	10	Sushila Karki	Independent
12	Rameshwor Prasad Khanal	22 September 2025	27 March 2026	186	Sushila Karki	Independent
13	Pratibha Rawal	27 March 2026	Incumbent	164	Balen Shah	Rastriya Swatantra Party
