= Minister of Health and Food Hygiene (Nepal) =

Head of the Ministry of Health and Food Hygiene of Government of Nepal

- स्वास्थ्य तथा खाद्य स्वच्छता मन्त्री
- Emblem of Nepal

- Flag of Nepal
- Incumbent; Nisha Mehta since 14 May 2026
- Ministry of Health and Food Hygiene
- Style: Honourable
- Member of: Council of Ministers
- Reports to: Prime Minister, Parliament
- Seat: Singha Durbar, Nepal
- Nominator: Prime Minister
- Appointer: President
- Term length: No fixed term
- Formation: 14 May 2026
- Deputy: Minister of State for Health and Food Hygiene

The Minister of Health and Food Hygiene (Nepali: स्वास्थ्य तथा खाद्य स्वच्छता मन्त्री) is the head of the Ministry of Health and Food Hygiene. One of the senior-most officers in the Federal Cabinet, the minister is responsibility for overall policy formulation, planning, organisation and coordination of the health sector at national, province, district and community levels.

Nisha Mehta is the current Minister of Health and Food Hygiene, assuming office from 27 March 2026.

== List of ministers ==
#	Name	Took of office			Prime Minister	Minister's Party
Minister of Health and Population
1	Upendra Yadav	1 June 2018	20 November 2019	537	KP Sharma Oli	FSFN
1	Upendra Yadav	1 June 2018	20 November 2019	537	KP Sharma Oli	SPN
2	Bhanu Bhakta Dhakal	20 November 2019	25 December 2020	401	KP Sharma Oli	CPN (UML)
3	Hridayesh Tripathi	25 December 2020	4 June 2021	161	KP Sharma Oli	PPP
4	Sher Bahadur Tamang	4 June 2021	22 June 2021	18	KP Sharma Oli	CPN (UML)
5	Krishna Gopal Shrestha	24 June 2021	12 July 2021	18	KP Sharma Oli	CPN (UML)
–	Sher Bahadur Deuba	13 July 2021	8 October 2021	87	Sher Bahadur Deuba	Nepali Congress
6	Birodh Khatiwada	8 October 2021	27 June 2022	262	Sher Bahadur Deuba	CPN (Unified Socialist)
7	Bhawani Prasad Khapung	27 June 2022	26 December 2022	182	Sher Bahadur Deuba	CPN (Unified Socialist)
–	Pushpa Kamal Dahal	26 December 2022	17 January 2023	22	Puspha Kamal Dahal	CPN (Maoist Centre)
8	Padam Giri	17 January 2023	27 February 2023	41	Puspha Kamal Dahal	CPN (UML)
–	Pushpa Kamal Dahal	27 February 2023	3 May 2023	65	Puspha Kamal Dahal	CPN (Maoist Centre)
9	Mohan Bahadur Basnet	3 May 2023	4 March 2024	306	Puspha Kamal Dahal	Nepali Congress
–	Pushpa Kamal Dahal	4 March 2024	10 March 2024	2	Puspha Kamal Dahal	CPN (Maoist Centre)
10	Upendra Yadav	10 March 2024	13 May 2024	64	Puspha Kamal Dahal	PSP-N
11	Pradeep Yadav	13 May 2024	8 July 2024	56	Puspha Kamal Dahal	PSP
–	Pushpa Kamal Dahal	8 July 2024	15 July 2024	7	Puspha Kamal Dahal	CPN (Maoist Centre)
12	Pradip Paudel	15 July 2024	9 September 2025	421	KP Sharma Oli	Nepali Congress
–	Sushila Karki	12 September 2025	26 October 2025	44	Sushila Karki	Interim
13	Sudha Sharma Gautam	26 October 2025	27 March 2026	152	Sushila Karki	Interim
14	Nisha Mehta	27 March 2026	14 May 2026	48	Balendra Shah	RSP
Minister of Health and Food Hygiene
(14)	Nisha Mehta	14 May 2026	Incumbent	116	Balendra Shah	RSP
