= Minister of Land Management, Cooperatives, Federal Affairs and General Administration =

Head of a federal ministry of Nepal

- भूमि व्यवस्था, सहकारी, संघीय मामिला तथा सामान्य प्रशासन मन्त्री
- Emblem of Nepal

- Flag of Nepal
- Incumbent; Pratibha Rawal since 14 May 2026
- Ministry of Land Management, Cooperatives, Federal Affairs and General Administration
- Member of: Council of Ministers
- Reports to: Prime Minister
- Appointer: The President
- Inaugural holder: Pratibha Rawal
- Formation: May 13, 2026

The Minister of Land Management, Cooperatives, Federal Affairs and General Administration (Nepali: भूमि व्यवस्था, सहकारी, संघीय मामिला तथा सामान्य प्रशासन मन्त्री) is the head of the Ministry of Land Management, Cooperatives, Federal Affairs and General Administration of the Government of Nepal. The minister is responsible for national policies relating to land administration, cadastral management, land reform, cooperative development, federal affairs coordination, local government administration, civil service management, and public administration across the country.

== List of ministers of land management, cooperatives, federal affairs and general administration ==
| No. | Portrait | Name | Party | Term of office | Cabinet |
|---|---|---|---|---|---|
| 1 | | Pratibha Rawal | Rastriya Swatantra Party | 13 May 2026 – Incumbent | Shah |
