= Minister of Women, Children, Gender and Sexual Minorities and Social Security =

Minister of federal ministry of Nepal

- महिला, बालबालिका, लैङ्गिक तथा यौनिक अल्पसङ्ख्यक र सामाजिक सुरक्षा मन्त्री
- Emblem of Nepal

- Flag of Nepal
- Incumbent; Sita Badi since 14 May 2026
- Ministry of Women, Children, Gender and Sexual Minorities and Social Security
- Style: Honurable
- Member of: Council of Ministers
- Reports to: Prime Minister, Federal Parliament of Nepal
- Appointer: The President
- Term length: Not fixed
- Inaugural holder: Sita Badi
- Formation: 13 May 2026; 3 months ago
- First holder: Sita Badi

The Minister of Women, Children, Gender and Sexual Minorities and Social Security (Nepali: महिला, बालबालिका, लैङ्गिक तथा यौनिक अल्पसङ्ख्यक र सामाजिक सुरक्षा मन्त्री) is the head of the Ministry of Women, Children, Gender and Sexual Minorities and Social Security of the Government of Nepal.

The portfolio was formed on 13 May 2026 by merging the former Ministry of Women, Children and Senior Citizens with the social security wing of the Ministry of Labour, Employment and Social Security, while expanding protection policies for LGBTQ+ groups.

The minister is responsible for administering national protective laws, social security schemes, protecting marginalized groups, and assuring the socio-political rights of gender and sexual minorities across the country.

== List of ministers ==
No.	Portrait	Name	Party	Term of office		Cabinet
1		Sita Badi	Rastriya Swatantra Party	13 May 2026	Incumbent	Shah
