= Council of Ministers of Nepal =

Executive organ of Nepalese government

- मन्त्रिपरिषद्
- Emblem of Nepal

Agency overview
- Formed: 18 February 1951; 75 years ago
- Type: Highest executive body of the Government of Nepal
- Jurisdiction: Nepal
- Headquarters: Singha Durbar, Kathmandu
- Prime Minister responsible: Balen Shah
- Agency executive: Gobinda Bahadur Karkee, Chief Secretary
- Child agency: Ministries of the Government of Nepal
- Website: opmcm.gov.np

The Council of Ministers (Nepali: मन्त्रिपरिषद्), also known as the Federal Executive, is the highest executive body of the federal government of Nepal. It serves as the central decision-making organ responsible for formulating and implementing national policies, administering the country, and directing the federal bureaucracy. The Prime Minister is the head of the Council of Ministers and holds the real executive authority in Nepal's parliamentary system.

Since 27 March 2026, the Council of Ministers has been led by Prime Minister Balen Shah of the Rastriya Swatantra Party.

== Formation ==
According to the Constitution of Nepal, the Prime Minister is appointed by the President of Nepal. The President on the recommendation of the Prime Minister of Nepal forms a council of ministers consisting of members not exceeding twenty five in number from among the members of the federal parliament on the basis of the principle of inclusion.

== Constitutional Basis ==
Under the Constitution of Nepal (Part 7: Federal Executive), executive power is vested in the Council of Ministers. The President (head of state) formally appoints the Prime Minister and, on the Prime Minister's recommendation, other members of the Council. The Council operates on the principles of collective responsibility and political inclusion.

== Removal ==
According to the Constitution of Nepal, the minister ceases to hold office by:

- tendering resignation in writing to the Prime Minister,
- removal by the Prime Minister,
- vacancy in the office of Prime Minister, or,
- death.

== Oath of Office And Secrecy ==
Members of the Council of Ministers of Nepal are required to take an oath of office and secrecy before the President prior to assuming their duties, in accordance with Part 7 Article 80 of the Constitution of Nepal. The form and wording of the oath are prescribed by the Act Relating to oath, 2079.

'म (नाम) नेपालको सार्वभौमसत्ता र राजकीयसत्ता नेपाली जनतामा निहित रहेको नेपालको संविधानप्रति पूर्ण वफादार रही सत्य निष्ठापूर्वक प्रतिज्ञा गर्दै ईश्वरको/देश र जनताको नाममा शपथ लिन्छु कि प्रधानमन्त्रि/मन्त्रि पदको जिम्मेवारी प्रचलित कानूनको पालना गरी मुलुक र जनताको भलो चिताई कसैको डर नमानी, पक्षपात नगरी, पूर्वाग्रह वा खराब भावना नराखी इमान्दारीका साथ वहन गर्नेछु र आफ्नो कर्तव्य पालनाको सिलसिलामा आफूलाई जानकारीमा आएको कुरा म पदमा बहाल रहँदा वा नरहँदा जुनसुकै अवस्थामा पनि प्रचलित कानूनको पालना गर्दा बाहेक अरु अवस्थामा कुनै किसिमबाट पनि प्रकट वा संकेत गर्ने छैन।'

— अनुसूची; दफा ३(२), ३(३) र ५(२), शपथ सम्बन्धी ऐन, २०७९

'I, (name), do swear in the name of God (or, solemnly affirm in the name of the Nation and the People) that I will bear true faith and allegiance to the Constitution of Nepal, in which the sovereignty and state authority of Nepal are vested in the Nepali people. I will faithfully discharge the duties of my office as Prime Minister(or, Minister) in compliance with the prevailing laws, keeping the welfare of the country and the people as my foremost concern, without fear or favour, impartiality or prejudice, and with honesty. I further swear/affirm that I will not disclose or indicate any information that comes to my knowledge in the course of performing my duties, except as required by law, whether I remain in office or not.'

— Schedule; Sections 3(2), 3(3), and 5(2), Act Relating to oath, 2079

Note: The above English text is an unofficial translation and is a direct rendering of the original Nepali version as provided in the Act Relating to Oath, 2079. In case of any inconsistency, the Nepali version shall prevail.

== Key Roles and Powers ==
- Policy Making & Administration: The Council directs all federal executive functions, implements laws passed by Parliament, manages the national budget, and oversees foreign policy, security, and development programmes.
- Collective Responsibility: The Council is collectively responsible to the Federal Parliament, particularly the House of Representatives. It must maintain the confidence of the lower house to remain in power.
- Decision Making: Major decisions are taken in cabinet meetings chaired by the Prime Minister.

The Council operates from Singha Durbar in Kathmandu, the main government complex.

== Current Council of Ministers ==
The list of ministers is as follows:

Balen Shah Cabinet
Minister	Portfolio	Office(s)	Took office	Ref.
Prime Minister
Balendra Shah	Prime Minister of Nepal	Office of the Prime Minister and Council of Ministers	27 March 2026 (231 days)	
Balendra Shah	Minister of Defence	Ministry of Defence	27 March 2026 (231 days)	
Minister
Dr. Swarnim Wagle	Minister of Finance	Ministry of Finance	27 March 2026 (231 days)	
Shishir Khanal	Minister of Foreign Affairs	Ministry of Foreign Affairs	27 March 2026 (231 days)	
Biraj Bhakta Shrestha	Minister of Energy, Water Resources and Irrigation	Ministry of Energy, Water Resources and Irrigation	27 March 2026 (231 days)	
Sudan Gurung	Minister of Home Affairs	Ministry of Home Affairs	9 June 2026 (157 days)	
Sunil Lamsal	Minister of Infrastructure Development	Ministry of Infrastructure Development	27 March 2026 (231 days)	
Sobita Gautam	Minister of Law, Justice and Parliamentary Affairs	Ministry of Law, Justice and Parliamentary Affairs	27 March 2026 (231 days)	
Mahabir Pun	Minister of Science, Technology and Innovation	Ministry of Science, Technology and Innovation	9 June 2026 (157 days)	
Sita Badi	Minister of Women, Children, Gender and Sexual Minorities and Social Security	Ministry of Women, Children, Gender and Sexual Minorities and Social Security	27 March 2026 (231 days)	
Pratibha Rawal	Minister of Land Management, Cooperatives, Federal Affairs and General Administration	Ministry of Land Management, Cooperatives, Federal Affairs and General Administration	27 March 2026 (231 days)	
Nisha Mehta	Minister of Health and Food Safety	Ministry of Health and Food Safety	27 March 2026 (231 days)	
Sasmit Pokharel	Minister of Education and Sports	Ministry of Education and Sports	27 March 2026 (231 days)	
Khadak Raj Paudel	Minister of Culture, Tourism and Civil Aviation	Ministry of Culture, Tourism and Civil Aviation	27 March 2026 (231 days)	
Dr. Bikram Timilsina	Minister of Information and Communication	Ministry of Information and Communication	27 March 2026 (231 days)	
Geeta Chaudhary	Minister of Agriculture, Forests and Environment	Ministry of Agriculture, Forests and Environment	27 March 2026 (231 days)	
Ramjee Yadav	Minister of Youth, Labour and Employment	Ministry of Youth, Labour and Employment	10 April 2026 (217 days)	
Deepak Kumar Sah	Minister of Industry, Commerce and Supplies	Ministry of Industry, Commerce and Supplies	10 September 2026 (64 days)	
Source: Office of the Prime Minister & Council of Ministers

== History ==
The modern Council of Ministers traces its roots to the 1951 democratic revolution that ended the Rana regime. Nepal has since transitioned through various political systems, from absolute monarchy to multiparty democracy and finally to a federal republic in 2008. The current framework was established by the Constitution of Nepal, which introduced a federal structure with three tiers of government.
