= Minister of Youth, Labour and Employment (Nepal) =

Head of the Ministry of Youth, Labour and Employment

- युवा, श्रम तथा रोजगार मन्त्री
- Emblem of Nepal

- Flag of Nepal
- Incumbent; Ramjee Yadav since 10 April 2026
- Ministry of Youth, Labour and Employment
- Style: Honourable
- Member of: Council of Ministers
- Reports to: Prime Minister, Parliament
- Seat: Singha Durbar, Nepal
- Nominator: Prime Minister
- Appointer: President
- Term length: No fixed term
- Precursor: Minister of Labour, Employment, Women, Children and Social Security

The Minister of Youth, Labour and Employment (Nepali: युवा, श्रम तथा रोजगार मन्त्री) is the head of the Ministry of Youth, Labour and Employment of the Government of Nepal. One of the senior-most officers in the Federal Cabinet, the minister is responsible for formulating policies and programs such as regulation of foreign labor and employment opportunities that make foreign employment safe, dignified and orderly. The minister also has an important role in the determination and implementation of Nepal's foreign employment policy.

Currently, Ramjee Yadav is serving as the Minister of Youth, Labour and Employment since 10 April 2026.

== List of former ministers ==
#	Name	Took of office			Prime Minister	Minister's Party
Minister of Labour, Employment and Social Security
1	Gokarna Bista	16 March 2018	20 November 2019	614	KP Sharma Oli	CPN (MC)
1	Gokarna Bista	16 March 2018	20 November 2019	614	KP Sharma Oli	NCP
2	Rameshwor Raya Yadav	20 November 2019	20 December 2020	396	KP Sharma Oli	NCP
2	Rameshwor Raya Yadav	20 November 2019	20 December 2020	396	KP Sharma Oli	CPN (UML)
3	Gauri Shankar Chaudhary	25 December 2020	20 May 2021	146	KP Sharma Oli	CPN (Maoist Centre)
4	Bimal Prasad Shrivastav	4 June 2021	22 June 2021	18	KP Sharma Oli	PSP-Nepal
5	Krishna Gopal Shrestha	24 June 2021	12 July 2021	18	KP Sharma Oli	CPN (UML)
Minister of Youth, Labour and Employment
(13)	Ramjee Yadav	10 April 2026	Incumbent	151	Balendra Shah	RSP
