= Premiership of Balen Shah =

Period of the Government of Nepal since 2026

- Premiership of Balen Shah; 27 March 2026 – present
- President: Ram Chandra Paudel
- Vice President: Ram Sahaya Yadav
- Cabinet: Shah cabinet
- Party: Rastriya Swatantra Party
- Election: 2026
- Seat: Singha Durbar
- Constituency: Jhapa 5
- Emblem of Nepal

The premiership of Balen Shah began on 27 March 2026, when Balen Shah took the oath as prime minister of Nepal at Rashtrapati Bhavan. He succeeded Sushila Karki, who led the interim government formed after the 2025 Gen-Z protests.

Shah assumed office on 27 March 2026 after being appointed Prime Minister under Article 76 (1) of the Constitution of Nepal by President Ram Chandra Paudel. His premiership marked a significant shift in Nepalese politics, representing a generational transition and the rise of a non-traditional political leader with strong support among younger voters.

Before becoming prime minister, Shah served as the 15th Mayor of Kathmandu from 2022 to 2026 and was the first independent politician elected to the office. On 28 December 2025, Shah formally joined the Rastriya Swatantra Party (RSP) and led it to a decisive parliamentary majority, winning 182 out of the 275 seats in the House of Representatives in the 2026 general election, which led to his appointment as Prime Minister on 27 March 2026.

Shah's premiership is widely seen as a major turning point in Nepalese politics, breaking the dominance of traditional political parties and reflecting a shift toward younger leadership and alternative political movements.

== Background ==
The 2026 general election was held following widespread anti-corruption protests in 2025, largely driven by youth movements demanding political reform, accountability, and economic opportunity. Shah emerged as a central figure during this period, positioning himself as an anti-establishment candidate advocating transparency and governance reform.

== Inauguration ==
Balen Shah was inaugurated for the first term as prime minister on 27 March 2026 at 12:34 NST auspicious timing for the oath. The ceremony was held in Rashtrapati Bhavan, Maharajgunj which was commenced with the performance of shankhanaad (blowing of conch shells). In addition, swastishanti recitations were performed by 108 Batuks, while 16 Buddhist monks conducted ashtamangal chanting. Shah along with 15 other members of the cabinet took oath. President Ram Chandra Paudel administered the oath.

== Cabinet ==
The Balen Shah cabinet was formed on 27 March 2026 following the swearing-in of the prime minister. The cabinet consists of 15 members, including key appointments such as economist Swarnim Wagle as Minister of Finance.

== Policies and agenda ==
Shah's government has emphasized:

- Anti-corruption reforms
- Government transparency and accountability
- Youth employment and economic development
- Reduction of government expenditure

His administration has also committed to investigating the 2025 protest-related violence and holding former officials accountable.

== See also ==
- Balen Shah cabinet
- Prime Minister of Nepal
- Rastriya Swatantra Party
- 2026 Nepalese general election
- List of prime ministers of Nepal
