= Minister of Defence (Nepal) =

Head of the Ministry of Defence

- रक्षा मन्त्री
- Emblem of Nepal

- Flag of Nepal
- Incumbent; Balendra Shah since 27 March 2026 (as Prime Minister of Nepal)
- Ministry of Defence
- Style: His Excellency
- Member of: Council of Ministers
- Reports to: Prime Minister
- Seat: Kathmandu, Nepal
- Nominator: Prime Minister
- Appointer: The president
- Term length: At the pleasure of the The president.
- Inaugural holder: Baber Shumsher Jung Bahadur Rana

The Minister of defence (Rakshā Mantri) is the head of the Ministry of Defence and a high ranking minister of the government of Nepal. The defence minister is one of the most senior offices in the Council of Ministers as well as being a high-level minister in the union cabinet.

== List of ministers of defence ==
Giri Prasad Burathoki, the defence minister during much of King Mahendra's reign, had himself been a highly decorated (retired) officer of the British Indian Army.

This is a list of all ministers of Defense since the Nepalese Constituent Assembly election in 2013:

	Name	Party	Assumed office	Left office
1	Interim Prime Minister Khil Raj Regmi	Independent	11 February 2014	25 February 2014
2	Prime Minister Sushil Koirala	Nepali Congress	25 February 2014	12 October 2015
3	Bhim Bahadur Rawal	Communist Party of Nepal (Unified Marxist–Leninist)	5 November 2015	1 August 2016
4	Bal Krishna Khand	Nepali Congress	26 August 2016	31 May 2017
5	Bhimsen Das Pradhan	Nepali Congress	26 July 2017	15 February 2018
6	Ishwor Pokharel	Communist Party of Nepal (Unified Marxist–Leninist)	26 February 2018	4 June 2021
7	Minendra Rijal	Nepali Congress	8 October 2021	16 December 2021
8	Hari Prasad Upreti	Communist Party of Nepal (Unified Marxist–Leninist)	17 January 2023	27 February 2023
9	Purna Bahadur Khadka	Nepali Congress	30 March 2023	14 July 2024
10	Manbir Rai	Communist Party of Nepal (Unified Marxist–Leninist)	15 July 2024	9 September 2025
Office Vacant (9 September 2025 - 27 March 2026)
11	Balendra Shah	Rastriya Swatantra Party	27 March 2026	Incumbent
