= Minister of Industry, Commerce and Supplies =

Head of the Ministry of Industry, Commerce and Supplies

- उद्योग, वाणिज्य तथा आपूर्ति मन्त्री
- Emblem of Nepal

- Flag of Nepal
- Incumbent; Deepak Kumar Sah
- Ministry of Industry, Commerce and Supplies
- Style: Honourable
- Member of: Council of Ministers
- Reports to: Prime Minister, Parliament
- Seat: Singha Durbar, Nepal
- Nominator: Prime Minister
- Appointer: President
- Term length: No fixed term
- Precursor: Minister of Industry; Minister of Commerce; Minister of Supplies

The Minister of Industry, Commerce and Supplies (Nepali: उद्योग, वाणिज्य तथा आपूर्ति मन्त्री) is the head of the Ministry of Industry, Commerce and Supplies. One of the senior-most officers in the Federal Cabinet, the minister is responsible for creating a favorable environment for industrial development and investment promotion. The minister has also expressed his involvement in formulating policies and programs related to industry, commerce and supply and in frugal cooperation and exchange with various ministries and agencies of the Government of Nepal.

== List of former ministers ==
#	Name	Took of office			Prime Minister	Minister's Party
1	Matrika Prasad Yadav	26 February 2018	20 November 2019	632	KP Sharma Oli	CPN (MC)
1	Matrika Prasad Yadav	26 February 2018	20 November 2019	632	KP Sharma Oli	NCP
2	Lekh Raj Bhatta	21 November 2019	20 May 2021	546	KP Sharma Oli	NCP
2	Lekh Raj Bhatta	21 November 2019	20 May 2021	546	KP Sharma Oli	CPN (UML)
3	Raj Kishor Yadav	10 June 2021	22 June 2021	12	KP Sharma Oli	PSP–N
4	Bishnu Prasad Paudel	24 June 2021	12 July 2021	18	KP Sharma Oli	CPN (UML)
5	Gajendra Bahadur Hamal	8 October 2021	10 October 2021	2	Sher Bahadur Deuba	Nepali Congress
6	Sher Bahadur Deuba	10 October 2021	7 April 2022	179	Sher Bahadur Deuba	Nepali Congress
7	Dilendra Prasad Badu	7 April 2022	26 December 2022	263	Sher Bahadur Deuba	Nepali Congress
8	Damodar Bhandari	26 December 2022	27 February 2023	63	Pushpa Kamal Dahal	CPN (UML)
9	Ramesh Rijal	31 March 2023	4 March 2024	339	Pushpa Kamal Dahal	Nepali Congress
10	Damodar Bhandari	6 March 2024	3 July 2024	119	Pushpa Kamal Dahal	CPN (UML)
–	Pushpa Kamal Dahal	4 July 2024	15 July 2024	12	Pushpa Kamal Dahal	CPN (MC)
11	Damodar Bhandari	15 July 2024	9 September 2025	421	KP Sharma Oli	CPN (UML)
Vacant (9 – 12 September 2025)
–	Sushila Karki	12 September 2025	22 September 2025	10	Sushila Karki	Independent
12	Anil Kumar Sinha	22 September 2025	27 March 2026	186	Sushila Karki	Independent
13	Balendra Shah	27 March 2026	10 April 2026	14	Balendra Shah	Rastriya Swatantra Party
14	Gauri Kumari Yadav	10 April 2026	10 September 2026	153	Balendra Shah	Rastriya Swatantra Party
15	Deepak Kumar Sah	10 September 2026	Incumbent	0	Balendra Shah	Rastriya Swatantra Party
