= Ministry of Land Management, Cooperatives, Federal Affairs and General Administration =

Federal ministry of Nepal

- भूमि व्यवस्था, सहकारी, संघीय मामिला तथा सामान्य प्रशासन मन्त्रालय
- Emblem of Nepal

Ministry overview
- Formed: 13 May 2026
- Preceding agencies: Ministry of Land Management, Cooperatives and Poverty Alleviation; Ministry of Federal Affairs and General Administration
- Jurisdiction: Government of Nepal
- Headquarters: Singha Durbar, Kathmandu
- Minister responsible: Pratibha Rawal, Cabinet Minister
- Website: mofaga.gov.np

The Ministry of Land Management, Cooperatives, Federal Affairs and General Administration (Nepali: भूमि व्यवस्था, सहकारी, संघीय मामिला तथा सामान्य प्रशासन मन्त्रालय) is a federal ministry of Nepal responsible for land administration, the cooperative sector, and the management of the civil service and local government relations.

This ministry was established on May 13, 2026, under the Balendra Shah-led government through the merger of the former Ministry of Land Management, Cooperatives and Poverty Alleviation and the Ministry of Federal Affairs and General Administration as part of a broader administrative restructuring.
