= Minister of Culture, Tourism and Civil Aviation =

Head of the Ministry of Culture, Tourism and Civil Aviation of the Government of Nepal

- संस्कृति, पर्यटन तथा नागरिक उड्डयन मन्त्री
- Emblem of Nepal

- Emblem of Nepal
- Incumbent; Khadak Raj Paudel since 27 March 2026
- Ministry of Culture, Tourism and Civil Aviation
- Style: Honourable
- Member of: Council of Ministers
- Reports to: Prime Minister, Parliament
- Seat: Singha Durbar, Nepal
- Nominator: Prime Minister
- Appointer: President
- Term length: No fixed term
- Deputy: Minister of State in the Ministry of Culture, Tourism and Civil Aviation

The Minister of Culture, Tourism and Civil Aviation (Nepali: संस्कृति, पर्यटन तथा नागरिक उड्डयन मन्त्री) is the head of the Ministry of Culture, Tourism and Civil Aviation of the Government of Nepal. One of the senior-most officers in the Federal Cabinet, the minister is responsibility for promoting tourism, culture and private sector involvement in Nepal. The Minister is assisted by the Minister of State for Culture, Tourism and Civil Aviation and the junior Deputy Minister of Culture, Tourism and Civil Aviation.

The current minister is Khadak Raj Paudel who took office on 27 March 2026.

== List of ministers of culture, tourism and civil aviation ==
This is a list of former Ministers of Culture, Tourism and Civil Aviation since the Nepalese Constituent Assembly election in 2008:

Portrait	Minister (Birth-Death) Constituency	Took office	Left office	Party	Government	Prime Minister	Ref
	Hisila Yami (born 1959); MCA for Kathmandu 7	August 18, 2008	May 25, 2009	Communist Party of Nepal (Maoist Centre)	Dahal I	Pushpa Kamal Dahal	
	Sharat Singh Bhandari (born 1954); MCA for Mahottari 6	May 25, 2009	February 6, 2011	Communist Party of Nepal (Unified Marxist–Leninist)	Nepal	Madhav Kumar Nepal	
	Khadga Bahadur Bishwakarma (born 1968); MCA for Kalikot 1	May 4, 2011	August 29, 2011	Communist Party of Nepal (Unified Marxist–Leninist)	Khanal	Jhala Nath Khanal	
	Ram Kumar Shrestha	March 18, 2013	February 11, 2014	Independent	Regmi	Khil Raj Regmi	
	Bhim Acharya (born 1959); MCA for Sunsari 6	February 25, 2014	September 13, 2014	Nepali Congress	Koirala	Sushil Koirala	
	Deepak Chandra Amatya	September 14, 2014	May 22, 2015	Nepali Congress	Koirala	Sushil Koirala	
	Kripasur Sherpa	May 23, 2015	October 12, 2015	Nepali Congress	Koirala	Sushil Koirala	
	Ananda Pokharel	November 5, 2015	August 4, 2016	Communist Party of Nepal (Unified Marxist–Leninist)	Oli I	KP Sharma Oli	
	Jeevan Bahadur Shahi (born 1965); MCA for Humla 1	August 26, 2016	May 8, 2017	Communist Party of Nepal (Maoist Centre)	Dahal II	Pushpa Kamal Dahal	
	Jitendra Narayan Dev	May 8, 2017	May 31, 2017	Communist Party of Nepal (Maoist Centre)	Dahal II	Pushpa Kamal Dahal	
	Jitendra Narayan Dev	July 26, 2017	February 15, 2018	Nepali Congress	Deuba IV	Sher Bahadur Deuba	
	Rabindra Prasad Adhikari (1969–2019); Kaski 2	March 16, 2018	February 27, 2019	Nepal Communist Party	Oli II	KP Sharma Oli	
	KP Sharma Oli (born 1952); MP for Jhapa 5	March 1, 2019	July 30, 2019	Nepal Communist Party	Oli II	KP Sharma Oli	
	Yogesh Bhattarai (born 1966); MP for Taplejung 1	July 31, 2019	December 20, 2020	Nepal Communist Party	Oli II	KP Sharma Oli	
	Bhanu Bhakta Dhakal (born 1962); MP for Morang 3	December 25, 2020	June 4, 2021	Communist Party of Nepal (Unified Marxist–Leninist)	Oli II	KP Sharma Oli	
	Uma Shankar Aragriya (born 1977); MP for Dhanusha 2	June 4, 2021	June 22, 2021	Communist Party of Nepal (Unified Marxist–Leninist)	Oli II	KP Sharma Oli	
	Lila Nath Shrestha (born 1962); MP for Siraha 3	June 24, 2021	July 12, 2021	Communist Party of Nepal (Unified Marxist–Leninist)	Oli II	KP Sharma Oli	
	Prem Ale (born 1970); MP for Doti 1	October 8, 2021	June 28, 2022	Nepali Congress	Deuba V	Sher Bahadur Deuba	
	Jeevan Ram Shrestha (born 1965); MP for Kathmandu 8	June 30, 2022	December 26, 2022	Nepali Congress	Deuba V	Sher Bahadur Deuba	
	Sudan Kirati (born 1979); MP for Bhojpur 1	January 17, 2023	March 4, 2024	Communist Party of Nepal (Maoist Centre)	Dahal III	Pushpa Kamal Dahal	
	Hit Bahadur Tamang (born 1963); MP for Nuwakot 1	March 4, 2024	15 July 2024	Communist Party of Nepal (Maoist Centre)	Dahal III	Pushpa Kamal Dahal	
	Badri Prasad Pandey	16 July 2024	12 September 2025	Nepali Congress	Oli IV	KP Sharma Oli	
	Anil Kumar Sinha	22 December 2025	27 March 2026	Independent	Karki Interim Cabinet	Sushila Karki	
	Khadak Raj Paudel	27 March, 2026	Incumbent	Rastriya Swatantra Party	Balen Shah Cabinet	Balendra Shah	
