= Shah cabinet =

Shah cabinet may refer to:

- First Kamal Bahadur Shah cabinet: Sudurpashchim Province government between 2023 and 2024 in Nepal
- Second Kamal Bahadur Shah cabinet: Sudurpashchim Province government since 2024 in Nepal
- Balen Shah cabinet: Nepal government since 2026
