= Largest Human Flag of India =

Crowd world-record attempt

- Date: December 7, 2014
- Location: Chennai, Tamil Nadu, India; 13°1′39″N 80°14′23″E
- Organised by: Rotary International
- Participants: 43,830
- Footage: rotarymyflagmyindia.com

Largest Human Flag of India was an event organised to form the world's largest human national flag in Chennai, Tamil Nadu, India. It was organised on 7 December 2014 by Rotary International in India with a slogan Rotary My Flag My India. More than 50,000 Indians gathered in YMCA Grounds, Chennai to form the world's largest human national flag.

It is the official attempt to break the previous world record set by Nepal. The record was in the name of Human Values for Peace and Prosperity, an NGO in Nepal with a slogan – Breaking the Records to Unite the Hearts. They made their national flag by gathering 35,907 human on 23 August 2014.

== See also ==
- Flag of India
- State Emblem of India
- Largest Human Flag of Nepal
