= Minister of Law, Justice and Parliamentary Affairs (Nepal) =

Head of Ministry of Law, Justice and Parliamentary Affairs (Nepal)

- कानून, न्याय तथा संसदीय मामिला मन्त्री
- Emblem of Nepal

- Flag of Nepal
- Incumbent; Sobita Gautam since 27 March 2026
- Ministry of Law, Justice and Parliamentary Affairs
- Style: His Excellency
- Member of: Council of Ministers
- Reports to: Prime Minister of Nepal
- Seat: Singha Durbar, Kathmandu, Nepal
- Appointer: President of Nepal on the recommendation of the Prime Minister of Nepal
- Term length: No fixed term

The Minister of Law, Justice and Parliamentary Affairs is the head of the Ministry of Law, Justice and Parliamentary Affairs of the Government of Nepal. One of the senior-most officers in the Federal Cabinet, the minister has the responsibility to render opinions on, and to formulate and examine draft of, Bills, Ordinances, Rules and Formation Order, to render necessary opinions as required by the Government of Nepal on national and international legal disputes, and to perform acts relating to unification and codification of laws, research, review, reform of Nepal law, international law, the judicial system and the administration of justice.

The current minister is Sobita Gautam, who took office on 27 March 2026.

== Ministers of Law, Justice and Parliamentary Affairs (1953 to 2018) ==
=== Ministers of Law, Justice and Parliamentary Affairs ===
Some individuals were known as the Minister of Law, Minister of Law and Justice, Minister of State for Law and Justice or the Minister of Law, Justice and Parliamentary Affairs.

Denotes an Prime Minister
^{SM} Minister of State
^{†} Died in office
^{§} Resigned
^{®} Reappointed

Name	Assumed office	Left office
Minister of Law and Parliamentary Affairs
Kaji Manik Lal Rajbhandari	14 August 1952	15 June 1953
Suryanath Das Yadav	15 June 1953	18 February 1954
Bhadrakali Mishra	18 February 1954	11 April 1955
Ananda Shamsher	14 April 1955	27 January 1956
Aniruddha Prasad Singh	27 January 1956	5 February 1957
Aruna Shumsher J.B. Rana	5 February 1957	26 July 1957
Damar Bahadur Singh	26 July 1957	15 May 1958
Ranadhir Subba	15 May 1958	27 May 1959
Surya Prasad Upadhyaya	27 May 1959	30 June 1959
Minister of Law
Surya Prasad Upadhyaya	30 June 1959	15 December 1960
Minister of Law, Justice and Parliamentary Affairs
Anirudha Prasad Singh	27 December 1960	2 July 1962
Minister of Law and Justice
Anirudha Prasad Singh	3 July 1962	2 April 1963
Surya Bahadur Thapa	2 April 1963	16 June 1965
Badanand Jha	16 June 1965	11 April 1966
Bhuwan Lai Pradham	12 April 1966	10 August 1966
Nagendra Prasad Rijal	10 August 1966	29 May 1967
Surendra Bahadur Basnyat	29 May 1967	25 September 1968
Basudev Prasad Dhungana	25 September 1968^{[SM]}	6 April 1969
Basudev Prasad Dhungana	7 April 1969	12 April 1970
Narendra Kumar Pradhan	13 April 1970	13 April 1971
Shambhu Prasad Gewali	14 April 1971	15 April 1972
Rabindra Nath Sharma	16 April 1972	15 July 1973
Lal Bahadur Khadayat	16 July 1973	28 March 1974
Hom Bahadur Shrestha	29 March 1974	14 April 1975
Bhoj Raj Ghimire	14 April 1975	12 June 1975
Pitambar Dhoj Khati	13 June 1975^{[SM]}	1 December 1975
Jog Meher Shrestha	2 December 1975	2 September 1976
Rabindra Nath Sharma	3 September 1976	16 May 1977
Jog Meher Shrestha	17 May 1977	11 September 1977
Hom Bahadur Shrestha	12 September 1977	26 November 1978
Shri Bhadra Sharma	27 November 1978^{[SM]}	9 December 1978
Damador S.J.B. Rana	10 December 1978	13 April 1979
Krishna Prasad Pant	14 April 1979^{[SM]}	31 May 1979
Dambar Bahadur Basnet	1 June 1979^{[SM]}	14 January 1980
Marich Man Singh	15 January 1980	31 May 1980
Nain Bahadar Swanr	1 June 1980	15 June 1981
Bishnu Maden	16 June 1981^{[SM]}	9 October 1982
Bakhan Singh Gurung	10 October 1982	1 July 1983
Bakhan Singh Gurung	13 July 1983	8 February 1984^{[†]}
Padma Bahadur Khatri	8 February 1984	2 April 1984
Bishnu Maden	3 April 1984^{[SM]}	16 September 1984
Radhye Shyam Kamaro	17 September 1984^{[SM]}	20 March 1986
Rudra Prasad Giri	21 March 1986	15 June 1986
Hari Narayan Rajauriya	16 June 1986	8 March 1988
Badri Prasad Mandal	9 March 1988^{[SM]}	13 October 1988
Badri Prasad Mandal	31 October 1988	31 March 1990
Jit Singh Khadka	1 April 1990^{[SM]}	5 April 1990
Nain Bahadur Swanr	6 April 1990	18 April 1990
Nilamber Acharya	19 April 1990	28 May 1991
Minister of Law, Justice and Parliamentary Affairs
Taranath Ranabhat	29 May1991	29 December 1991
Maheshwar Prasad Singh	30 December 1991	29 November 1994
Subash Chandra Nemwang	30 November 1994^{[SM]}	28 December 1994
Subash Chandra Nemwang	29 December 1994	29 August 1995^{§}
Subash Chandra Nemwang	30 August 1995^{[®]}	11 September 1995
Kamal Thapa	12 september 1995	21 September 1995
Minister of Law and Justice
Bhim Bahadur Tamang	22 September 1995	10 March 1997
Rameshwar Raya Yadav	12 March 1997	24 March 1997
Prem Bahadur Singh	25 March 1997	26 July 1997
Prem Bahadur Singh	30 June 1997	21 September 1997
Bharat Mohan Adhikari	22 September 1997	6 October 1997
Surya Bahadur Thapa	7 October 1997	2 December 1997
Siddhi Raj Ojha	3 December 1997	12 April 1998
Siddhi Raj Ojha	21 April 1998	25 August 1998
Sita Nandan Raya	26 August 1998	5 December 1998
Bharat Mohan Adhikari	25 December 1998	27 may 1999
Taranath Ranabhat	31 May 1999	21 June 1999
Omkar Prasad Shrestha	22 June 1999	29 June 1999
Tarinee Datt Chataut	30 June 1999	22 February 2000
Prakash Man Singh	10 March 2000	21 March 2000
Minister of Law, Justice and Parliamentary Affairs
Mahantha Thakur	22 March 2000	25 July 2001
Sher Bahadur Deuba	26 July 2001	17 October 2001
Narendra Bikram Nembang	18 October 2001	4 October 2002
Dharma Bahadur Thapa	11 October 2002	10 April 2003
Lokendra Bahadur Chand	11 April 2003	4 June 2003
Surya Bahadur Thapa	5 June 2003	3 August 2003
Hari Bahadur Basnet	4 August 2003	2 June 2004
Sher Bahadur Deuba	3 June 2004	4 July 2004
Tek Bahadur Chokhyal	5 July 2004	1 February 2005
Dharma Bahapur Thapa	2 February 2005	13 February 2005
Tulsi Giri	14 February 2005	13 July 2005
Niranjan Thapa	14 July 2005	23 April 2006
Narendra Bikram Nembang	22 May 2006	1 April 2007
Narendra Bikram Nembang	1 April 2007	18 August 2008
Minister of Law, Justice and Constitution Assembly
Dev Gurung	22 August 2008	22 May 2009
Madhav Kumar Nepal	23 May 2009	17 June 2009
Minister of Law and Justice
Madhav Kumar Nepal	17 June 2009	2 July 2009
Prem Bahadur Singh	3 July 2009	5 February 2011
Jhala Nath Khanal	6 February 2011	9 March 2011
Krishna Bahadur Mahara	10 March 2011	3 May 2011
Prabhu Sah	4 May 2011	29 August 2011
Hridayesh Tripathi	4 September 2011	14 September 2011
Brijesh Kumar Gupta	15 September 2011	4 May 2012
Minister of Law, Justice, Constituent Assembly and Parliamentary Affairs
Krishna Prasad Sitaula	18 May 2012	29 May 2012
Baburam Bhattarai	30 May 2012	13 March 2013
Hari Prasad Neupane	14 March 2013	11 February 2014
Narahari Acharya	25 February 2014	12 October 2015

== List of former ministers ==
Nepali Congress
Nepal Communist Party
CPN (Unified Marxist–Leninist)
CPN (Maoist Centre)
CPN (Unified Socialist)
Samajbadi Party Nepal
Rastriya Prajatantra Party

#	Name	Took of office			Prime Minister	Minister's Party
1	Sher Bahadur Tamang	16 March 2018	24 July 2018	130	KP Sharma Oli	CPN (UML)
1	Sher Bahadur Tamang	16 March 2018	24 July 2018	130	KP Sharma Oli	NCP
2	Bhanu Bhakta Dhakal	3 August 2018	20 November 2019	474	KP Sharma Oli	NCP
3	Upendra Yadav	21 November 2019	24 December 2019	33	KP Sharma Oli	SPN
4	Bhanu Bhakta Dhakal	10 January 2020	17 February 2020	38	KP Sharma Oli	NCP
5	Shiva Maya Tumbahamphe	17 February 2020	25 December 2020	312	KP Sharma Oli	NCP
6	Lilanath Shrestha	25 December 2020	4 June 2021	161	KP Sharma Oli	CPN (UML)
7	Gyanendra Bahadur Karki	13 July 2021	8 October 2021	87	Sher Bahadur Deuba	Nepali Congress
8	Dilendra Prasad Badu	8 October 2021	7 April 2022	181	Sher Bahadur Deuba	Nepali Congress
9	Gobinda Bandi	7 April 2022	26 December 2022	263	Sher Bahadur Deuba	Nepali Congress
10	Dhruba Bahadur Pradhan	17 January 2023	25 February 2023	39	Pushpa Kamal Dahal	RPP
11	Purna Bahadur Khadka	19 April 2023	2 May 2023	13	Pushpa Kamal Dahal	Nepali Congress
12	Dhanraj Gurung	3 May 2023	4 March 2024	305	Pushpa Kamal Dahal	Nepali Congress
13	Padam Giri	4 March 2024	3 July 2024	927	Pushpa Kamal Dahal	CPN (UML)
–	Pushpa Kamal Dahal	4 July 2024	15 July 2024	12	Pushpa Kamal Dahal	CPN (MC)
14	Ajay Chaurasiya	15 July 2024	12 September 2025	424	K. P. Sharma Oli	Nepali Congress
–	Sushila Karki	12 September 2025	15 September 2025	3	Sushila Karki	Independent
15	Om Prakash Aryal	15 September 2025	22 September 2025	10	Sushila Karki	Independent
16	Anil Kumar Sinha	22 September 2025	27 March 2026	186	Sushila Karki	Independent
17	Sobita Gautam	27 March 2026	Incumbent	174	Balen Shah	Rastriya Swatantra Party
