= Anil Kumar Sinha =

Nepalese politician; Former Justice, Supreme Court of Nepal

- अनिल कुमार सिन्हा

Minister of Energy, Water Resources and Irrigation of Nepal
- In office 7 January 2026 – 27 March 2026
- President: Ram Chandra Poudel
- Prime Minister: Sushila Karki
- Preceded by: Kul Man Ghising
- Succeeded by: Biraj Bhakta Shrestha

Minister of Industry, Commerce and Supplies of Nepal
- In office 22 September 2025 – 27 March 2026
- President: Ram Chandra Poudel
- Prime Minister: Sushila Karki
- Preceded by: Damodar Bhandari
- Succeeded by: Balendra Shah

Minister of Law, Justice and Parliamentary Affairs of Nepal
- In office 22 September 2025 – 27 March 2026
- President: Ram Chandra Poudel
- Prime Minister: Sushila Karki
- Preceded by: Om Prakash Aryal
- Succeeded by: Sobita Gautam

Minister of Culture, Tourism and Civil Aviation of Nepal
- In office 12 December 2025 – 27 March 2026
- President: Ram Chandra Poudel
- Prime Minister: Sushila Karki
- Preceded by: Badri Pandey
- Succeeded by: Khadak Raj Poudel

Minister of Land Management, Cooperatives and Poverty Alleviation of Nepal
- In office 22 September 2025 – 12 December 2025
- President: Ram Chandra Poudel
- Prime Minister: Sushila Karki
- Preceded by: Balaram Adhikari
- Succeeded by: Kumar Ingnam

Justice of the Supreme Court of Nepal
- In office 1 August 2016 – 31 October 2023
- Nominated by: Judicial Council of Nepal
- Appointed by: President of Nepal

Personal details
- Born: 31 October 1958 (age 67) Nepal
- Education: LLB; LLM
- Alma mater: Tribhuvan University

Anil Kumar Sinha (Nepali: अनिल कुमार सिन्हा) is a Nepalese politician who served as the Minister of Industry, Commerce and Supply; Law, Justice and Parliamentary Affairs; Land Management, Cooperative and Poverty Alleviation from 22 September 2025 till 27 March 2026 in the Karki interim cabinet. He is also former Justice of the Supreme Court of Nepal who served from 1 August 2016 to 31 October 2023. He was appointed as Justice by the President of Nepal on the recommendation of the Judicial Council of Nepal on 1 August 2016.

== Early life and education ==
Mr. Sinha was born on October 31, 1958, in Nepal. Sinha received a graduate degree in Law from Nepal Law Campus, Tribhuvan University, Nepal in 1982.

== Career ==
He began his legal career in 2039 B.S after graduating from Nepal Law Campus and later became a senior advocate before his appointment to the Supreme Court. Sinha is widely recognized as a legal expert in taxation and corporate law. Sinha was recognized as an advocate the year of his graduation (1982) and was honored by the Supreme Court as a Senior Advocate in 2013. During a professional career as an advocate lasting 34 years, he dedicated most of his time in Business Law, mainly Contracts and Commercial Arbitration, Taxation, Company Law, Foreign Investments, Banking and Insurance Law, etc.

=== Justice of the Supreme Court ===
During his seven years at the Supreme Court, he played a key role in several landmark cases, including the eligibility dispute of former CIAA Chief Lokman Singh Karki, the dissolution of the House of Representatives by then-Prime Minister KP Sharma Oli on 5 Poush 2077 B.S, and the tax settlement commission controversy. He was also part of the bench that opened the door for investigation into the Lalita Niwas land scam involving government property in Baluwatar.
