= Man Bahadur Gurung (politician) =

Nepali politician

- मन बहादुर गुरुङ्ग

Member of Parliament, Pratinidhi Sabha
- In office 26 December 2022 – 26 March 2026
- Preceded by: Khagaraj Adhikari
- Succeeded by: Khadak Raj Poudel
- Constituency: Kaski 1

Personal details
- Born: 13 April 1966 (age 59) Kaski District
- Party: CPN (UML)

Man Bahadur Gurung is a Nepalese politician belonging to the CPN (UML), who served as a member of the 2nd Federal Parliament of Nepal. In the 2022 Nepalese general election, he was elected from the Kaski 1 (constituency).
