= Janani Janmabhūmishcha Swargādapi Garīyasī =

National motto of Nepal

"Jananī Janmabhūmiśca Swargādapi Garīyasī" (Devanagari: जननी जन्मभूमिश्च स्वर्गादपि गरीयसी; IAST: Jananī janmabhūmiśca svargādapi garīyasī, pronounced [d͡ʑɐnɐniː d͡ʑɐnmɐbʰuːmiɕt͡ɕɐ sʋɐrɡaːdɐpi ɡɐriːjɐsiː], Nepali: [d͡zʌnʌni d͡zʌnmʌbʱumist͡sʌ swʌrɡadʌpi ɡʌrijʌsi]) is a hemistich of a Sanskrit shloka traditionally attributed to the Hindu epic Ramayana (Note: Though many printed editions don't contain such a shloka), and the national motto of the Government of Nepal.

== Meaning ==
"Mother and motherland are greater than Heaven."

== Origin ==
The verse might be present in certain recensions of the Hindu epic Ramayana, though it is not present in its Critical Edition.

Further, at least two versions of the shloka are prevalent. In one version (found in an edition published by Hindi Prachara Press, Madras in 1930 by T. R. Krishna Chary, Editor and T. R. Vemkoba Chary the publisher at 6:124:17) it is spoken by Bharadvaja addressing Rama:

मित्राणि धन धान्यानि प्रजानां सम्मतानिव |
जननी जन्म भूमिश्च स्वर्गादपि गरीयसी ||
Translation: "Friends, riches and grains are highly honoured in this world. (But) mother and motherland are superior even to heaven."

In another version, it is spoken by Rama to Lakshmana:
अपि स्वर्णमयी लङ्का न मे लक्ष्मण रोचते |
जननी जन्मभूमिश्च स्वर्गादपि गरीयसी ||
Translation: "Lakshmana, even this golden Lanka does not appeal to me. Mother and motherland are superior even to heaven."

== See also ==
- Ramayana
- Coat of arms of Nepal
- List of national mottos
