= Ministry of Health and Food Safety =

Federal ministry of Nepal

- स्वास्थ्य तथा खाद्य स्वच्छता मन्त्रालय
- Emblem of Nepal

Ministry overview
- Formed: 13 May 2026; 3 months ago
- Preceding Ministry: Ministry of Health and Population
- Jurisdiction: Government of Nepal
- Headquarters: Singha Durbar, Kathmandu
- Cabinet Minister responsible: Nisha Mehta, Cabinet Minister
- Ministry executive: Dr. Bikash Devkota, Secretary
- Website: mohp.gov.np

The Ministry of Health and Food Safety (Nepali: स्वास्थ्य तथा खाद्य स्वच्छता मन्त्रालय) is a federal ministry of Nepal responsible for oversight of public health services, population management and the assurance of food safety and quality.

It was established on 13 May 2026, following the approval of Nepal Government (Work Division) Regulations, 2083. The ministry was created by restructuring the former Ministry of Health and Population and absorbing the food safety and quality control portfolios.
