= Shiva Maya Tumbahamphe =

Nepali politician

Shiva Maya Tumbahamphe (Limbu)
- शिव माया तुम्बाहाङफे

Ambassador of Nepal to South Korea
- In office 8 January 2025 – 6 April 2026
- President: Ram Chandra Poudel

Minister of Land Management, Cooperatives and Poverty Alleviation of Nepal
- In office 25 December 2020 – 4 June 2021
- President: Bidhya Devi Bhandari
- Prime Minister: KP Sharma Oli
- Preceded by: Padma Kumari Aryal
- Succeeded by: Laxman Lal Karna

Minister of Law, Justice and Parliamentary Affairs of Nepal
- In office 17 February 2020 – 25 December 2020
- President: Bidhya Devi Bhandari
- Prime Minister: KP Sharma Oli
- Preceded by: Bhanu Bhakta Dhakal
- Succeeded by: Lila Nath Shrestha

Deputy Speaker of the Pratinidhi Sabha
- In office 15 March 2018 – 20 January 2020
- President: Bidhya Devi Bhandari
- Prime Minister: KP Sharma Oli
- Speaker: Krishna Bahadur Mahara
- Preceded by: Ganga Prasad Yadav (as Deputy Speaker of Constituent Assembly of Nepal)
- Succeeded by: Pushpa Bhusal (Gautam) (from 15 July 2022)

Member of Parliament, Pratinidhi Sabha
- In office 4 March 2018 – 18 September 2022

Member of the CPN (UML) Central Committee
- In office 2014–2017

Personal details
- Born: 18 January 1964 (age 62) Tehrathum District, Nepal
- Party: CPN (UML)
- Other party: Nepal Communist Party (NCP)
- Education: Tribhuvan University (PhD)

Shiva Maya Tumbahamphe Limbu (Nepali: शिव माया तुम्बाहाङफे) is a Nepali politician and diplomat who served as the Ambassador of Nepal to South Korea from 2025 to 2026. She has also served as the Minister of Law, Justice and Parliamentary Affairs, Minister of Land Management, Cooperatives and Poverty Alleviation and as the deputy speaker of the House of Representatives. She has been active in politics for more than four decades as a communist leader in eastern Nepal. She holds a PhD in political science from Tribhuvan University. Before being elected the deputy speaker of the house, she was a central committee member of the CPN (UML).

== Early life and education ==
She was born in Tehrathum district. She went to school in Jhapa District. She took a break from politics to pursue her doctorate following the successful 2006 revolution. She went on to achieve a PhD in political science from Tribhuvan University. Her PhD thesis on "political movement of women in Nepal" was titled "नेपालमा राजनीतिक महिला आन्दोलन: विश्लेषणात्मक अध्ययन वि. सं. २०४७-२०६०", Nepalma Rajnitik Mahila Andolan: Vishleshanaatmak Adhyayan 2047-2060 BS. Bijay Subba, another prominent leader of the NCP, is her brother.

== Political career ==
She has been actively involved in politics for the last 40 years. She has been politically active from Morang district. She joined active politics as a member of the CPN (ML) affiliated student union, ANNFSU. She was central deputy chair of ANNFSU at the time she graduated from student politics in 2052 BS (1995–96). She registered as a member of CPN (ML) in 2047 BS (1990–91) and was elected to the central committee of CPN (UML) by the ninth general convention in 2071 BS (2014–15). She also briefly served as the Morang district incharge of the party, before its merger to form Nepal Communist Party (NCP) in 2018.

She was nominated as the ambassador of Nepal to Israel by the cabinet of KP Sharma Oli in 2016, but the government was dissolved before her nomination could be confirmed. She is considered to be a close ally of prime minister KP Sharma Oli, in addition to being particularly close to president Bidhya Devi Bhandari.

She was elected to the federal parliament under the proportional representation system, nominated by the Communist Party of Nepal (Unified Marxist–Leninist) (CPN UML), and elected as deputy speaker with the support of her party CPN (UML), as well as the Communist Party of Nepal (Maoist Centre) (CPN MC) of the left alliance, defeating Pushpa Bhusal of Nepali Congress, on 15 March 2018 by a margin of 143 votes. Her election as deputy speaker was controversial due to the fact that the constitution prohibits having both speaker and deputy speaker from the same party, which has been the case since the merger of CPN (UML) and CPN (MC) to form the NCP. Following her election as deputy speaker, she resigned as a member of her party as per the constitutional requirement. She was 53 years old when elected deputy speaker. She resigned as the deputy speaker on 20 January 2020, and on 17 February 2020 was appointed as the Minister for Law, Justice and Parliamentary Affairs.

She is the younger sister of NCP leader Bijay Subba, who is also a central committee member of the party and a member of the House of Representatives through proportional representation system. Subba is said to have been inspired to pursue his own doctorate (in "the political movement of indigenous peoples") from the example of Tumbahamphe. While Subba had once defected from the party and started his own party, Tumbahamphe has been a life-long member of the CPN (UML). Tumbahamphe famously challenged Bhim Acharya to a trainer dual once, after Acharya reportedly suggested a need to bring in trainers from the capital to educate party cadres in her district. She supports increasing government expenditure on public education.

== Personal life ==
Tumbahamphe was married to Late Ghanendra Jimi, who was once elected chairperson of Urlabari VDC representing CPN (UML).
