= Sudha Sharma Gautam =

Nepalese Minister of Health and Population Since 2025

Honourable Sudha Sharma Gautam
- सुधा शर्मा गौतम

Minister of Health and Population of Nepal
- In office 26 October 2025 – 27 March 2026
- President: Ram Chandra Poudel
- Prime Minister: Sushila Karki (Interim)
- Preceded by: Pradip Paudel
- Succeeded by: Nisha Mehta

Secretary at Ministry of Health and Population
- In office October 2008 – December 2011

Personal details
- Party: Independent
- Parent: Laxmi Nath Gautam (father)

Dr. Sudha Sharma Gautam (Note: Nepali: डा. सुधा शर्मा गौतम) is a Nepalese politician and senior obstetrician-gynecologist who served as a minister of health and population in the Sushila Karki led interim Government from 26 October 2025 to 27 March 2026. She was a former Secretary at the Ministry of Health and Population from October 2008 to December 2011.

She also previously served as President of the Nepal Medical Association, President of Nepal Society of Obstetricians and Gynecologists, President of the South Asian Federation of Obstetrics and Gynecology, Chairman of Education Committee of the Asia Oceana Federation of Obstetrics and Gynecology and former Director of Paropakar Maternity and Women's Hospital in Thapathali, Kathmandu.

== Books and publications ==
In 2021, she published a memoir entitled Singha Durbar ko Ghumne Mech, which can be translated to The Revolving Chair of Singha Durbar and loosely based on large scale corruption and patriarchal bureaucracy in health sectors of Nepal.
