= Largest Human Flag of Nepal =

World record attempt

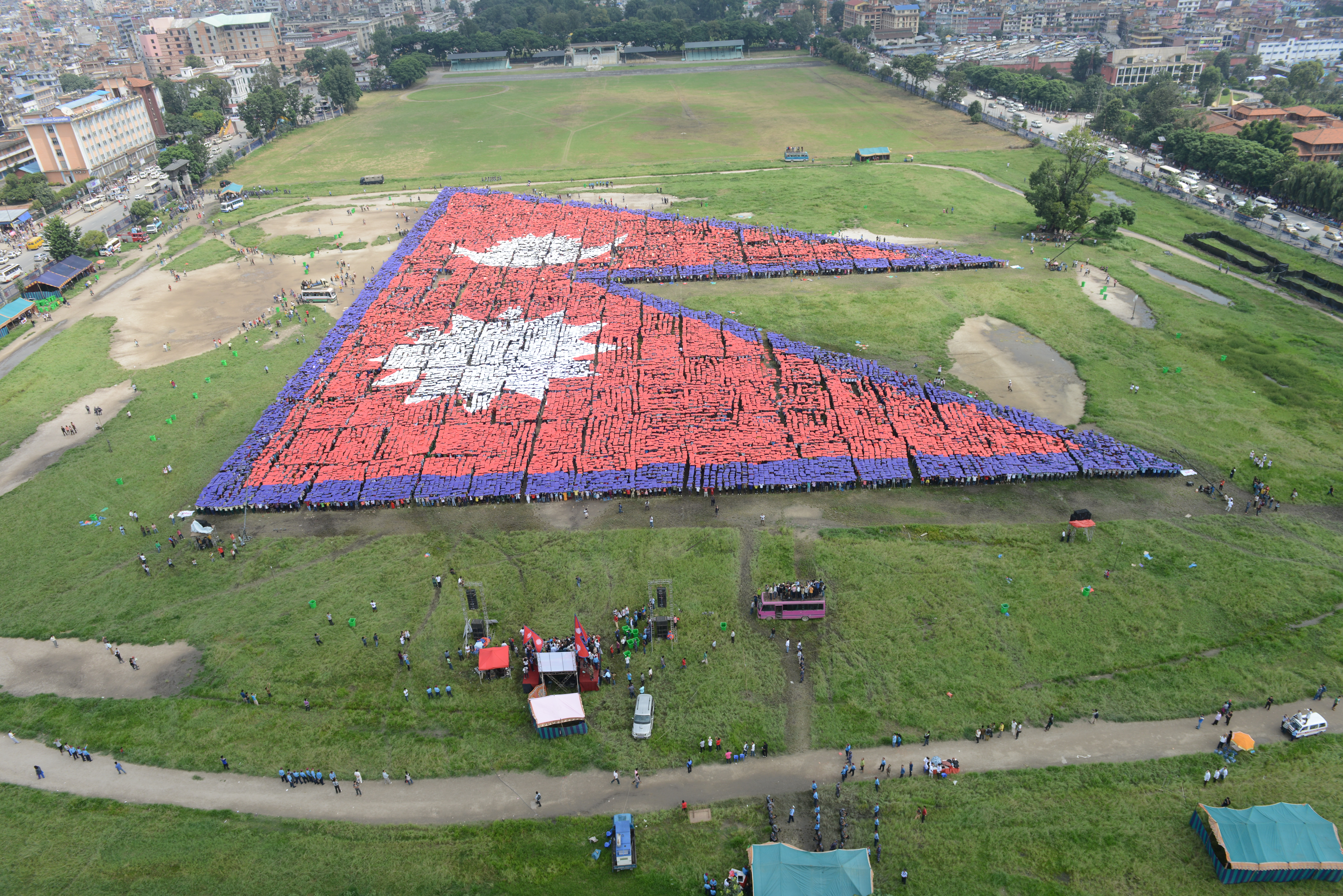
- Date: 23 August 2014
- Location: Tundikhel, Kathmandu
- Organised by: Human Values for Peace and Prosperity
- Participants: 35,907

The Largest Human Flag of Nepal was an event organized to form the world's largest human national flag in Kathmandu. It was organized on 23 August 2014 by Human Values for Peace and Prosperity, an NGO in Nepal with the slogan ”Breaking the Records to Unite the Hearts”. More than 35,000 Nepalese gathered in Tundikhel in Kathmandu to form the world's largest human national flag.

== Overview ==
It is the official attempt to break the previous world record set by Pakistan. They made their national flag by gathering 29000+ humans in February 2014. For proof, a helicopter was used to take the pictures and capture the video and has been sent to Guinness Book of World Records for the verification, which takes around eight weeks to announce.

Nepal is the only country whose flag consists of two triangles instead of a quadrilateral.

The purpose of this largest human flag is not only to break the previous world record, but also to spread the message that all Nepalese are under one flag.

The organization HVPP has planned to distribute the certificates for participation since October 9. The design for the certificate has been approved by the Nepal Government.

== Gallery ==
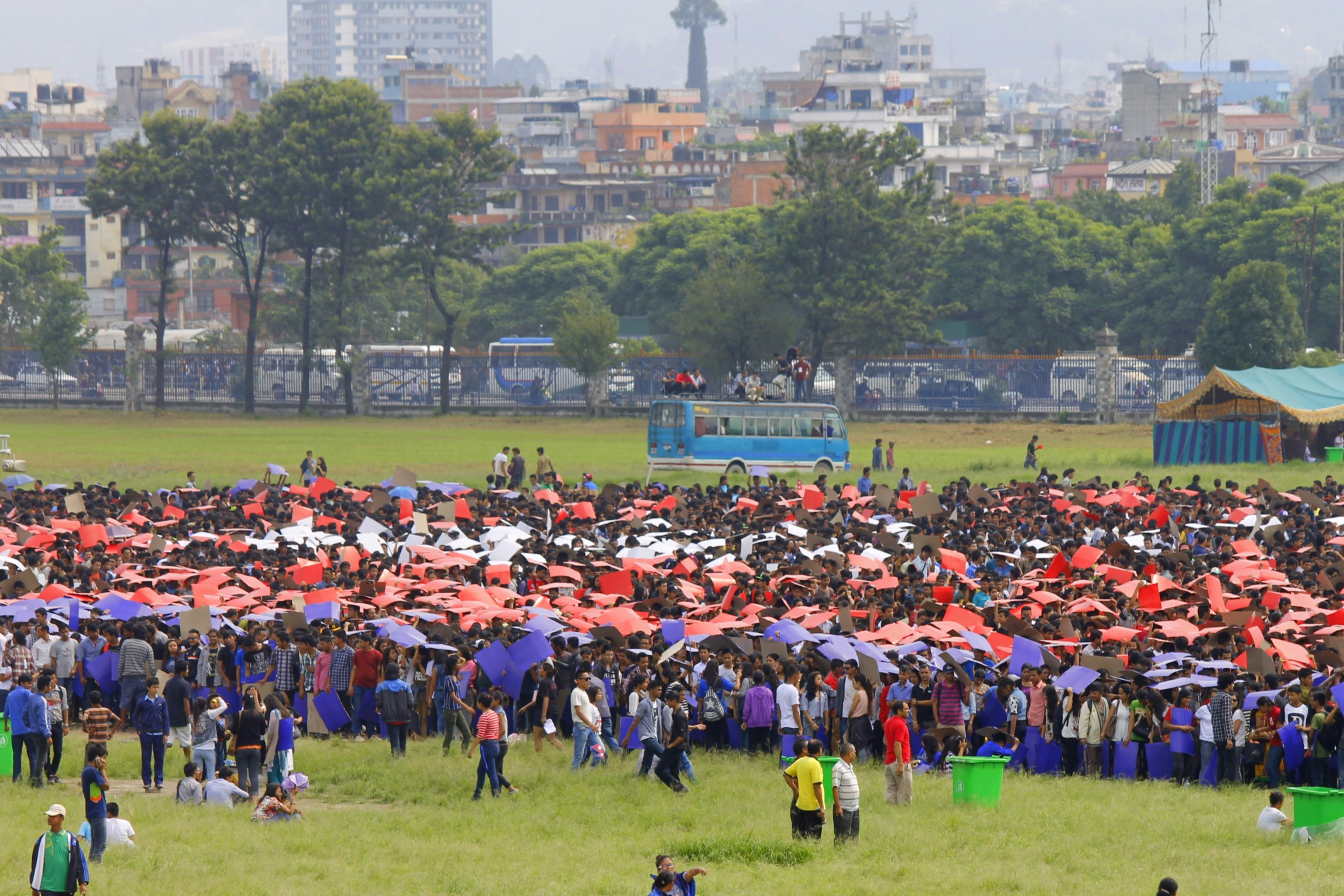
Human Flag in Nepal
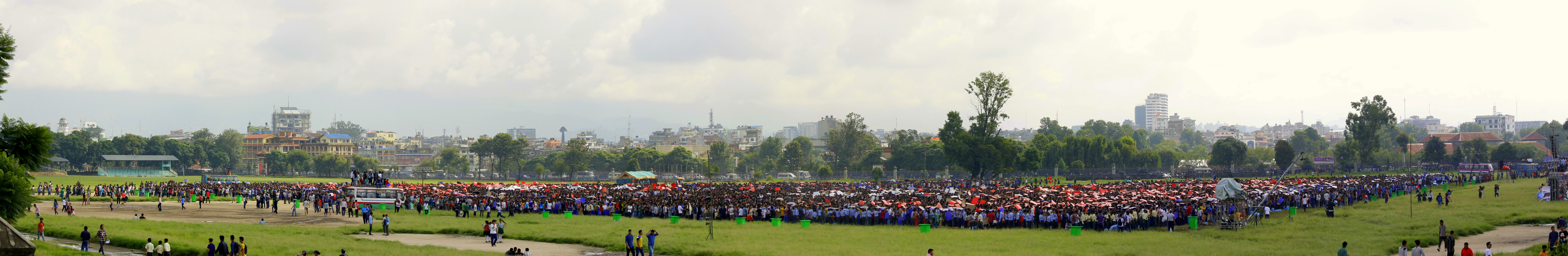
Panoramic Human Flag of Nepal

== See also ==
- Flag of Nepal
- Emblem of Nepal
- Largest Human Flag of India
