= Ministry of Youth, Labour and Employment =

Federal ministry of Nepal

- युवा, श्रम तथा रोजगार मन्त्रालय
- Emblem of Nepal

Ministry overview
- Formed: 13 May 2026; 3 months ago
- Preceding agencies: Ministry of Labour, Employment and Social Security; Ministry of Youth and Sports
- Jurisdiction: Government of Nepal
- Headquarters: Singha Durbar, Kathmandu
- Minister responsible: Ramjee Yadav, Cabinet Minister
- Website: www.moless.gov.np

The Ministry of Youth, Labour and Employment is a federal ministry of Nepal responsible for youth development, labor rights, and national employment strategy. It was established on May 13, 2026, through the merger of the Youth wing of the dissolved Ministry of Youth and Sports and the Labour and Employment wings of the former Ministry of Labour, Employment and Social Security.

The ministry’s primary mandate is to address the country's youth unemployment crisis by integrating vocational training, labor migration management, and domestic job creation under a single administrative roof.
