= Pratibha Rawal =

Nepalese Minister for Federal Affairs and Land Management since 2026

- प्रतिभा रावल

Minister of Land Management, Cooperatives, Federal Affairs and General Administration
- Incumbent
- Assumed office 14 May 2026
- President: Ram Chandra Paudel
- Prime Minister: Balendra Shah
- Preceded by: Position established
Ministerial positions
Minister of Federal Affairs and General Administration
In office 27 March 2026 – 14 May 2026
President	Ram Chandra Paudel
Prime Minister	Balendra Shah
Preceded by	Rameshwor Prasad Khanal
Succeeded by	Ministry dissolved (succeeded by Ministry of Land Management, Cooperatives, Federal Affairs and General Administration)
Minister of Land Management, Cooperatives and Poverty Alleviation
In office 27 March 2026 – 14 May 2026
President	Ram Chandra Paudel
Prime Minister	Balendra Shah
Preceded by	Kumar Ingnam
Succeeded by	Ministry dissolved (succeeded by Ministry of Land Management, Cooperatives, Federal Affairs and General Administration)

Member of Parliament, Pratinidhi Sabha
- Incumbent
- Assumed office 27 March 2026
- Constituency: Party list

Personal details
- Born: Bhimdatta, Kanchanpur District, Nepal
- Citizenship: Nepali
- Party: Rastriya Swatantra Party
- Spouse: Prem Aryal
- Parent: Maya Rawal (mother)

Pratibha Rawal (Note: Nepali: प्रतिभा रावल) is a Nepalese politician, journalist, central committee member, and co-spokesperson of Rastriya Swatantra Party since 2022. She has served as the Minister of Land Management, Cooperatives, Federal Affairs and General Administration in the government led by Prime Minister Balen Shah.

She is a member of parliament from the Rastriya Swatantra Party.

== Political career ==
Rawal was elected to the Pratinidhi Sabha from Rastriya Swatantra Party at the 2026 general election. She was elected from the party list under the Khas Arya female cluster.
