= Sobita Gautam =

Nepalese Minister of Law, Justice and Parliamentary Affairs

Minister of Law, Justice and Parliamentary Affairs
- Incumbent
- Assumed office 27 March 2026
- President: Ram Chandra Poudel
- Prime Minister: Balen Shah
- Preceded by: Anil Kumar Sinha

Member of Parliament, Pratinidhi Sabha
- Incumbent
- Assumed office 26 March 2026
- Preceded by: Bikram Pandey
- Constituency: Chitwan 3
- In office 22 December 2022 – 12 September 2025
- Preceded by: Madhav Kumar Nepal
- Succeeded by: Sunil K.C.
- Constituency: Kathmandu 2

Vice Chairperson of the Rastriya Swatantra Party
- Incumbent
- Assumed office 26 June 2026 Serving with Swarnim Wagle
- President: Rabi Lamichhane
- Preceded by: Dol Prasad Aryal

Personal details
- Born: 17 June 1995 (age 31) Dolakha, Nepal
- Party: Rastriya Swatantra Party
- Education: Kathmandu University

Sobita Gautam (Note: Nepali: सोबिता गौतम) (born 17 June 1995) is a Nepalese politician who has served as the Minister of Law, Justice and Parliamentary Affairs since 27 March 2026. She was elected to the House of Representatives in 2022 from Kathmandu 2. At 27, she is the youngest directly-elected member in the House of Representatives. She is a vice president of the Rastriya Swatantra Party alongside Swarnim Wagle since 2026.

Gautam is also a youth activist, and a lawyer by profession. She hosted the television show "Swasthya Sarokar" for Nepal Television for over four years. In the past, she has written about the need to institutionalize and regulate assisted reproductive technology in Nepal.

== Personal life ==
Sobita Gautam is married to Grihendra Ghimire, a businessman.

== Education ==
Sobita Gautam graduated with her undergraduate degree in Development Studies at Kathmandu University. She also joined the course for a BA LL.B., as she pursued her academic interests in law as well as governance and public policy. Gautam's academic years were also marked by her participation in youth advocacy, student leadership, and discussions on issues of civic engagement, social justice, and democratic governance, all of which impacted her entry into national politics with the Rastriya Swatantra Party.

== Political career ==
Sobita Gautam is a founding member of the central committee of the Rastriya Swatantra Party. In the general election of 2022, Sobita Gautam contested the election to the House of Representatives from the Kathmandu-2 constituency as a candidate of the Rastriya Swatantra Party. She won the election with 15,229 votes, beating the Communist Party of Nepal (Unified Marxist-Leninist) candidate Maniram Phuyal by 3,674 votes. Other candidates in the constituency were Kunti Devi Pokharel of the Rastriya Prajatantra Party and Onsari Gharti Magar of the Communist Party of Nepal (Maoist Centre). With this election, Sobita Gautam became one of the youngest members of the House of Representatives elected from the newly formed party.

Following Gen Z–led protests after the formation of a new interim government and the announcement of fresh elections in March, Gautam later announced her candidacy from the Chitwan 3 constituency representing the Rastriya Swatantra Party.

=== Vice Chairperson of the Rastriya Swatantra Party ===
Gautam was elected as the female Vice Chairperson of the Rastriya Swatantra Party at the party's first general convention held in Chitwan on 26 June 2026. She defeated fellow party leader Toshima Karki in the election, while Swarnim Wagle was elected unopposed as Vice Chairperson representing the men's category.

== Parliamentary activities ==
Since her election to the House of Representatives, Gautam has been engaged in discussions related to governance, the participation of youth in politics, transparency, and accountability in the country's institutions. As a member of the Rastriya Swatantra Party, Gautam has been actively engaged in the political agenda of the party, which includes political reform, the fight against corruption, and the strengthening of democratic culture in Nepal. She has also been actively engaged in raising issues related to youth.

== See also ==
- Rastriya Swatantra Party
- Toshima Karki
