= Ramjee Yadav =

Nepalese politician

Minister of Youth, Labour and Employment
- Incumbent
- Assumed office 14 May 2026
- President: Ram Chandra Poudel
- Prime Minister: Balendra Shah
- Preceded by: Position established
Ministerial positions
Minister of Labour, Employment and Social Security
In office 10 April 2026 – 14 May 2026
President	Ram Chandra Poudel
Prime Minister	Balendra Shah
Preceded by	Dipak Kumar Sah
Succeeded by	Ministry dissolved (succeeded by Ministry of Youth, Labour and Employment and Ministry of Women, Children, Gender and Sexual Minorities and Social Security)

Member of Parliament, Pratinidhi Sabha
- Incumbent
- Assumed office 26 March 2026
- Preceded by: CK Raut
- Constituency: Saptari 2

Personal details
- Born: 12 November 1995 (age 30) Rajbiraj, Saptari District, Madhesh Province
- Party: Rastriya Swatantra Party
- Other political affiliations: Rastriya Janata Party; Janata Samajbadi Party; Loktantrik Samajbadi Party; Rastriya Mukti Party
- Spouse: Kajal Yadav
- Children: 1
- Parent: Surait Lal Yadav (father)
- Education: Kathmandu Engineering College- IOE (BE, Electrical Engineering); IIT Madras (M.Tech in Energy Systems)
- Profession: Politician; Engineer

Ramjee Yadav (born 12 November 1995) is a Nepalese politician and an electrical engineer, who is serving as the Minister of Labour, Employment and Social Security since 10 April 2026. He was appointed for the ministerial post following the removal of his predecessor Dipak Sah. He is a member of parliament representing Saptari-2 constituency in the 2026 Nepalese general election.

He contested the election after securing a ticket from Rastriya Swatantra Party he joined in 2026, and won with 28,404 votes, defeating CK Raut, Chairman of Janamat Party, Umesh Kumar Yadav, former Irrigation minister, and Satish Kumar Singh, former Chief Minister of Madhesh Province.

He entered into politics in 2017, taking a general membership of then Rastriya Janata Party Nepal after completing his engineering degree at Kathmandu Engineering College. Later he joined Janata Samajwadi Party in 2019 as a district committee member.

== Early life ==
Ramjee was born in Rajbiraj, Saptari district, on 12 November 1995, to a Maithil Yadav family. He did his MTech degree in energy systems from IIT Madras. Professionally, he is the managing director of Easyworld Engineering, an engineering consultant firm. He is married to Kajal Yadav, resident of Rajbiraj and the daughter of former mayor of Rajbiraj, Shambhu Prasad Yadav.

== Electoral performance ==
Election	Year	Constituency	Contested for	Political party	Result	Votes	% of votes
Nepal general election	2026	Saptari 2	Pratinidhi Sabha member	Rastriya Swatantra Party	Won	28,404	45.24%
