= Khadak Raj Paudel =

Nepalese minister of Culture and Tourism

- खडकराज पौडेल

Minister for Culture, Tourism and Civil Aviation
- Incumbent
- Assumed office 27 March 2026
- President: Ram Chandra Poudel
- Prime Minister: Balendra Shah
- Preceded by: Anil Kumar Sinha

Member of Parliament, Pratinidhi Sabha
- Incumbent
- Assumed office 27 March 2026
- Preceded by: Man Bahadur Gurung
- Constituency: Kaski 1

Personal details
- Born: 2 October 1979 (age 47) Pokhara, Kaski District, Nepal
- Citizenship: Nepali
- Party: Rastriya Swatantra Party
- Other political affiliations: Naya Shakti (2016); Independent
- Spouse: Natasha Parajuli
- Parent: Ram Prasad Paudel (father)
- Website: ganesspaudel.com.np

Khadak Raj Paudel (born 2 October 1979), also known as Ganesh is a Nepalese politician and writer serving as the minister of Culture, Tourism and Civil Aviation under the prime minister, Balen Shah.

He is a member of parliament (MP) for Kaski 1 from the Rastriya Swatantra Party.

== Early life and education ==
Paudel was born in Majheri Patan, Pokhara.

He got his BA in English Literature from Tribhuvan University. He also holds an MBA from Pokhara University.

== Political career ==
Paudel was briefly involved with Naya Shakti in 2016. Paudel contested for mayor of Pokhara as an independent at the 2022 local election and finished fourth.

Paudel was nominated as a central committee member of Rastriya Swatantra Party in January 2026. He was elected to the 7th House of Representatives for Kaski 1 at the 2026 Nepalese general election.

== Published works ==
- Paitala (2017)
- Musa Munus (2020), Nepali translation of Of Mice and Men by John Steinbeck
