= Nisha Mehta =

Nepalese politician (born 1987)

- निशा मेहता

Minister of Health and Food Hygiene
- Incumbent
- Assumed office 14 May 2026
- President: Ram Chandra Poudel
- Prime Minister: Balendra Shah
- Preceded by: Position established
Other ministerial positions
Minister of Health and Population
In office 27 March 2026 – 14 May 2026
President	Ram Chandra Poudel
Prime Minister	Balendra Shah
Preceded by	Sudha Sharma Gautam
Succeeded by	Ministry dissolved (succeeded by Ministry of Health and Food Security)
Minister of Water Supply
In office 27 March 2026 – 14 May 2026
President	Ram Chandra Poudel
Prime Minister	Balendra Shah
Preceded by	Madan Prasad Pariyar
Succeeded by	Ministry dissolved (succeeded by Ministry of Health and Food Security and Ministry of Infrastructure Development)

Member of Parliament, Pratinidhi Sabha
- Incumbent
- Assumed office 26 March 2026
- Constituency: PR

Personal details
- Born: 7 August 1987 (age 39) Inaruwa, Koshi, Nepal
- Party: Rastriya Swatantra Party
- Spouse: Dr. Saroj Singh
- Parents: Tej Narayan Mehta (father); Bimala Mehta (mother)
- Education: MSc. Nursing; BSc. Nursing
- Alma mater: Jiwaji University; AIIMS New Delhi

Nisha Mehta (Nepali: निशा मेहता; born 07 August 1987) is a Nepalese politician and professional health nurse. She is serving as the 14th Minister of Health and Food Hygiene of Nepal under Balen Shah Cabinet.

== Early life and education ==
Mehta was born in Inaruwa, Sunsari district of Koshi Province.She completed her Bachelor of Science in Nursing from College of Nursing, AIIMS New Delhi from 2006 to 2010 and did her Master of Science in Nursing from Post Graduate College of Nursing, Jiwaji University, India.

== Career ==
=== Nursing ===
She returned to Nepal and worked professionally for about three years as a clinical nurse at B.P. Koirala Institute of Health Sciences in Dharan. Then she joined Birat Teaching Hospital in Biratnagar, serving as both a nurse and an associate professor.

=== Politics ===
She has been a general member of the Rastriya Swatantra Party since its formation. Her name was listed in the party Proportional representation list in the 2022 general election, though she could not make it to the parliament.

Mehta was elected to the Pratinidhi Sabha from Rastriya Swatantra Party at the 2026 general election. She was elected from the party list under the Madheshi female cluster.
