= Constitution of Nepal =

Supreme law of Nepal

Constitution of the Federal Democratic Republic of Nepal
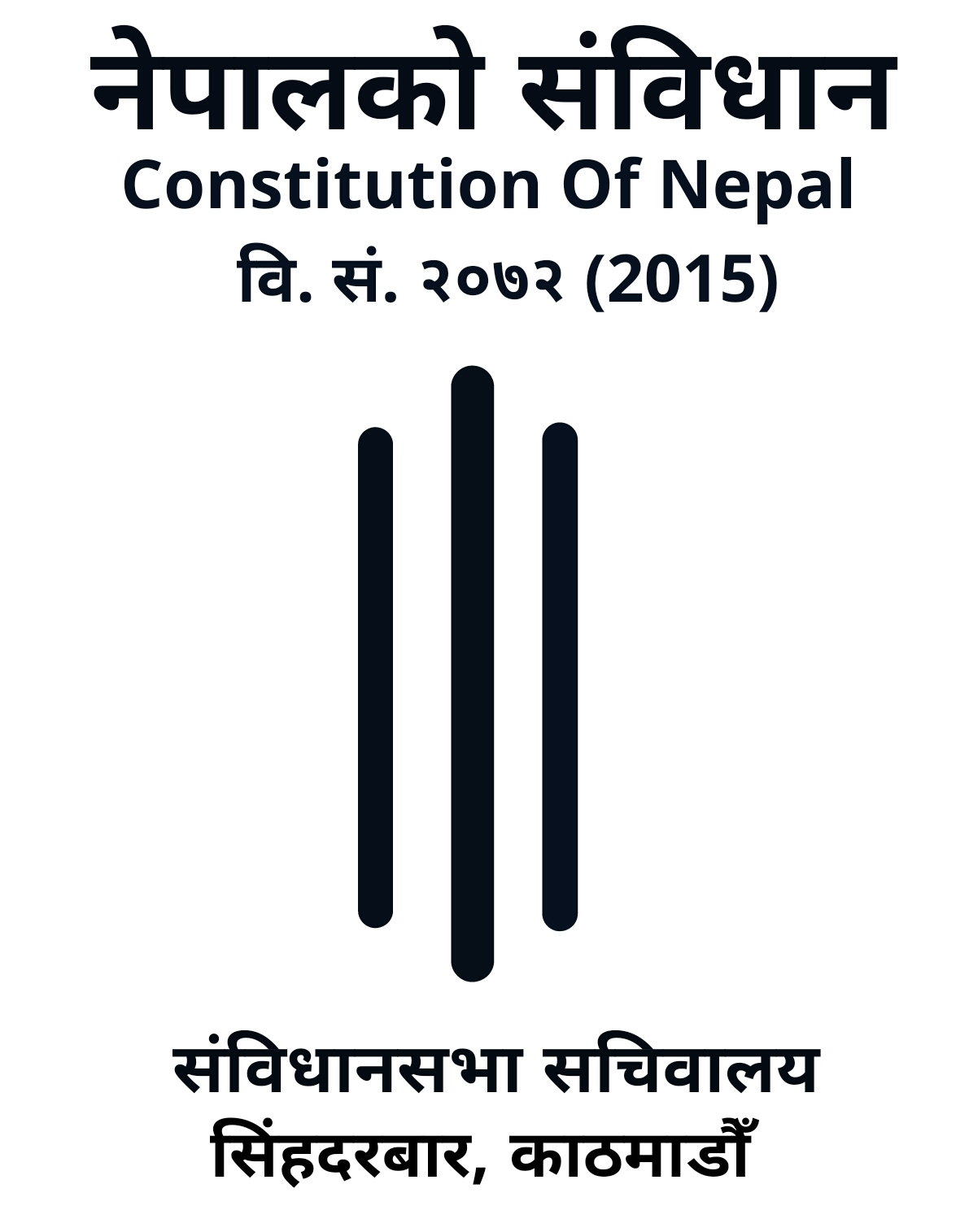

Overview
- Jurisdiction: Nepal
- Date effective: 20 September 2015; 11 years ago
- System: Federal parliamentary constitutional republic

Government structure
- Branches: Three (executive, legislative, judiciary)
- Head of state: President of Nepal
- Chambers: Two (House of Representatives and National Assembly )
- Executive: Prime Minister of Nepal-led cabinet responsible to the lower house of the parliament
- Judiciary: Supreme Court, High Courts, and District Courts
- Federalism: Yes

History
- Amendments: 2
- Last amended: 18 June 2020 (2nd)
- Commissioned by: Constituent Assembly of Nepal
- Signatories: 538 members of the Constituent Assembly

Full text
- Constitution of Nepal (2020) at Wikisource

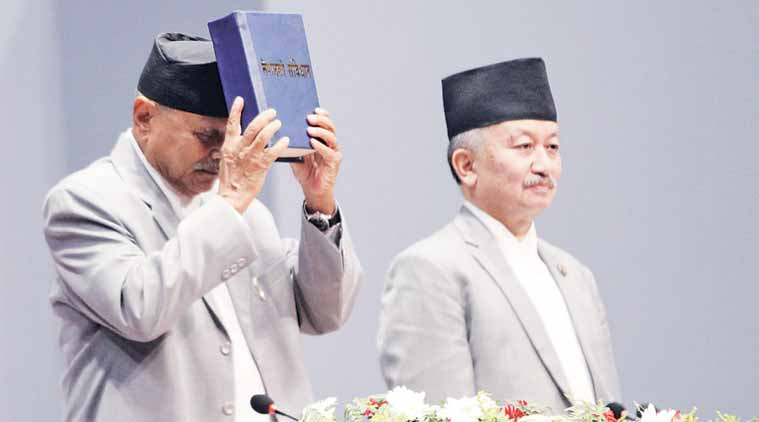
President Ram Baran Yadav bowing to the constitution during its promulgation on 20 September 2015. Beside Speaker of the House Subas Chandra Nembang.

The Constitution of Nepal (Nepali: नेपालको संविधान) is the supreme law of Nepal. The country is governed according to this constitution which came into effect on 20 September 2015, replacing the Interim Constitution of 2007. The constitution of Nepal is divided into 35 parts, 308 Articles and 9 Schedules.

The constitution was drafted by the Second Constituent Assembly following the failure of the First Constituent Assembly to produce a constitution in its mandated period after the earthquake in April 2015. The constitution was endorsed by 90% of the total legislators. Out of the 598 Constituent Assembly members, 538 voted in favour of the constitution while 60 members voted against it, including a few Terai-based political parties which refrained from the voting process.

Its institutions were put in place in 2010 and 2018 through a series of direct and indirect elections in all governing levels.

The constitution has been amended twice since its promulgation: first in 2072 BS (2016 AD), and second in 2077 BS (2020 AD).

== History ==
The Interim Constitution provided for a Constituent Assembly, which was charged with writing Nepal's temporary constitution. Under the terms of the Interim Constitution, the new constitution was to be promulgated by 28 April 2010, but the Constituent Assembly postponed the promulgation by a year because of disagreements. On 25 May 2011, the Supreme Court of Nepal ruled that the 2010 extension of the Interim Constitution was not legal. Since 29 May 2011 the Constituent Assembly repeatedly extended the Interim Constitution.

On 28 May 2012, the Constituent Assembly was dissolved after it failed to finish the constitution after the latest extension, ending four years of constitution drafting and leaving the country in a legal vacuum. New elections were held on 19 November 2013 to the Second Nepalese Constituent Assembly and political leaders pledged to draft a new constitution within a year. The new assembly expressly committed that the new constitution would be promulgated on 22 January 2015. However, due to continued differences on key issues including system of governance, judicial system and federation issues like number, name and areas of the states to be carved, the constitution could not be finalized and promulgated in time.

== Features ==
The constitution is largely written in gender-neutral terms. Among its important aspects:

- Internalization of the people's sovereign right and right to autonomy and self-rule, while maintaining freedom, sovereignty, territorial integrity, national unity, independence and dignity of Nepal.
- Commitment to competitive multi-party democratic governance system, civil liberties, fundamental rights, human rights, adult franchise, periodic elections, complete press freedom, independent, impartial and competent judiciary and the concept of rule of law and build a prosperous nation.
- Resolution to a just society with protection and promotion of social and cultural solidarity, co-existence, harmony, and unity in diversity, while ending all forms of discrimination and oppression, and recalling sacrifices made from time to time by people for national interest, democracy, progressive change the glorious history.
- Constitution as the fundamental law of Nepal, and every person bound to observe it.
- Nepal as an independent, indivisible, sovereign, secular, inclusive, democratic, socialism-oriented, federal democratic republican state.
- Safeguarding of the independence, sovereignty, territorial integrity, nationality, freedom, dignity of Nepal and of the rights of the Nepalese people, border security, economic wellbeing and prosperity as the fundamental tenets of national interest; and any conduct and act contrary to national interest being punishable.
- Nepali language in the Devanagari script as the official language of Nepal and all languages spoken as the mother tongues in Nepal being the languages of the nation.
- The Government of Nepal (GoN), within one year of the commencement of the Constitution, is to constitute a Language Commission with a chairperson and members comprising representation of the States.
- The Language Commission is to recommend to GoN the criteria for the recognition of the official language, measures to be adopted for the protection, promotion and development of languages, the levels of development of mother tongues and the potentiality of their use in education.
- No citizen of Nepal is to be deprived of the right to obtain citizenship.
- Provision of single federal citizenship with State identity.
- Right of person acquiring citizenship by descent to obtain the citizenship certificate with gender identity by the name of his or her mother or father.
- Provision of the non-residential citizenship of Nepal for a person, who has acquired the citizenship of a foreign country, has resided in a country other than a SAARC member state, and who or whose father or mother, grandfather or grandmother was previously a Nepalese citizen by descent or birth but subsequently acquired a foreign citizenship, thereby entitling such person to economic, social and cultural rights in accordance with the Federal law.
- Various civil, political, economic, social and cultural rights guaranteed as fundamental rights: rights to life with dignity, freedom, equality, communication, justice, property, freedom of religion, information, privacy, language and culture, employment, labor, clean environment, education, health care, food, housing, social justice, social security and constitutional remedy, rights against exploitation, torture, preventive detention, untouchability and discrimination and exile, and rights of women, children, Dalits, senior citizens, consumers and victim of crime.
- The State being bound to provide for legislative measures as required within three years of the commencement of the Constitution for implementation of these rights.
- Provision of affirmative action for the protection, empowerment or development of citizens including socially or culturally backward women, Dalit, indigenous, indigenous nationalities, Madhesi, Tharu, Muslim, oppressed class, Pichhada class, minorities, the marginalized, farmers, labours, youths, children, senior citizens, gender and sexual minorities, persons with disabilities, pregnant persons, incapacitated or helpless, backward region and economically indigent Khas Arya.
- Duties of citizens to safeguard the nationality, sovereignty and integrity of Nepal being loyal to the nation, abide by the Constitution and law, render compulsory service as and when the State so requires, and protect and promote public and national property.
- The State's political objective is to enhance freedom, sovereignty, territorial integrity and independence of Nepal by mutual cooperative federalism and incorporating the principle of proportional participation in the system of governance on the basis of local autonomy and decentralization.
- The State's social and cultural objective is to consolidate the national unity by maintaining social cohesion, solidarity and harmony, while recognizing cultural diversity; and its economic objective is to develop a socialism-oriented independent and prosperous economy.
- Stipulation of policies regarding national unity and national security, political and governance system of State, social, and cultural transformation, economy, industry and commerce, agriculture and land reforms, development, protection, promotion and use of natural resources, basic needs of the citizens, labour and employment, social justice and inclusion, justice and penal system, tourism and international relations.
- The State being obliged to make a prosperous and affluent country by protecting and promoting fundamental rights and human rights, pursuing directive principles of the State and gradually implementing policies of the State keeping intact the freedom, sovereignty, territorial integrity and independence of Nepal.
- GoN is to submit to the President an annual report containing the steps taken and achievements made in the implementation of the directives principles, policies and obligations of the state.
- Main structure of Nepal being of three levels, namely Federation, State and Local.
- Formation of Seven States in the State level and their names and capitals to be determined by two-thirds majority of the concerned State Assembly.
- The legislative power of the Local level to be vested in the Village Assembly and Municipal Assembly.
- Exclusive and concurrent powers of the Federation, State and Local levels being enumerated in the Schedules, with the residual power being vested in the Federation.
- The President, the head of state, is to be elected by an electoral college consisting of members of the Federal Parliament and the State Assemblies.
- The President and the Vice-president to be of different sex or community.
- A person already elected twice as the President is disqualified from becoming a candidate for the President.
- A multi-party, competitive, federal democratic republican parliamentary system based on plurality being the form of government.
- The executive power of Nepal being vested in the Council of Ministers in accordance with the Constitution and law.
- The President is to appoint the parliamentary party leader of the political party with the majority in the House of Representatives as the Prime Minister, and a Council of Ministers to be formed in his/her chairpersonship.
- The Federal Council of Ministers not to exceed 25 Ministers including the Prime Minister.
- A person defeated in the election to the then House of Representatives not to be qualified to be appointed as Minister during the term of such House of Representatives.
- No-confidence motion not to be moved until first two years of appointment of the Prime Minister and the member proposed for Prime Minister is also to be mentioned in such motion.
- Federal Legislature consisting of two Houses to be known as the House of Representatives and the National Assembly, called as the Federal Parliament.
- The House of Representatives consisting of 275 members: 165 members elected through the first-past-the-post electoral system, and 110 members through a proportional representation electoral system.
- In nominating candidates by political parties for election to the House of Representatives under the proportional electoral system, representation is to be ensured on the basis of a closed list also from women, Dalit, indigenous peoples, Khas Arya, Madhesi, Tharu, Muslims and backward regions, on the basis of population, also making geographical and territorial balance.
- At least one third of the total number of members elected from each political party representing in the Federal Parliament are to be women.
- The National Assembly, as a permanent House, consists of 59 members with eight members, including at least three women, elected from each State with 56 in total, and three members, including at least one woman, nominated by the President on recommendation of GoN.
- Election is to be so held that there is one woman out of the Speaker and the Deputy Speaker of the House of Representatives and one woman out of the chairperson and the vice-chairperson of the National Assembly.
- Provision of an independent, competent and unitary nature of judiciary in Nepal.
- Three tiers of courts: The Supreme Court, one High Court in each State, and one District Court in each district.
- The Supreme Court is to consist of a maximum of 20 Judges in addition to the Chief Justice.
- Provision of one Constitutional Bench, in the Supreme Court, consisting of five judges of the Supreme Court including the Chief Justice.
- Each High Court to consist of such number of Judges, in addition to the Chief Judge, as provided by the Federal law.
- Provision for formation of other specialized courts, judicial bodies or tribunals to try and settle specific types and nature of cases.
- Any criminal offence involving imprisonment for a term of more than one year not to be under the jurisdiction of a body other than a court, specialized court, military court or judicial body.
- Provision of form of government in the States similar to that in the Federation.
- Provision of a Chief of State in each State, as a representative of GoN being appointed by the President.
- A leader of the parliamentary party commanding a majority in the State Assembly to be appointed by the Chief of State as the Chief Minister, and the State Council of Ministers to be constituted under his or her chairpersonship.
- The State Council of Ministers not to exceed 20 percent of the total number of members of the State Assembly, including the Chief Minister.
- No-confidence motion not to be presented until two years of appointment of the Chief Minister, and the name of the member proposed for Chief Minister is to be mentioned in the no-confidence motion.
- Each State has a unicameral legislature, called the State Assembly. The State Assembly has the authority to draft laws although the Assent of the Chief of State is required for Approval.
- Each State Assembly consists of members in a number that is twice as many as the number of members elected to the House of Representatives from the concerned State, through the first past the post electoral system, considered as to be 60 percent, and the rest 40 percent members to be elected through the proportional electoral system.
- The executive power of the local level being vested in the Village and Municipal Executive.
- Each Village Executive is to consist of a chairperson, Vice-chairperson, Ward Chairperson, four women members and two members from the Dalit or minority communities elected by Village Assembly.
- Each Municipal Executive is to consist of a Mayor, Deputy Mayor, Ward Chairpersons, five women members and three members from the Dalit or minority communities elected by Municipal Assembly.
- The District Assembly being responsible for coordination between the Village Bodies and Municipalities within the district.
- The District Assembly consisting of chairpersons and vice-chairpersons of the Village Executives, and Mayors and Deputy Mayors of the Municipal Executives within the district.
- The District Assembly is to elect the District Coordination Committee consisting of a maximum of nine Members including one Chief, one Deputy Chief, at least three women and at least one Dalit or minority.
- Each Village Body is to consist of one Village Assembly consisting of the chairperson and vice-chairperson of the Village Executive, Ward Chairpersons and four persons elected from each Ward.
- Provision for representation of at least two women from each ward in the Village Assembly.
- Each Municipal Assembly is to consist of the Mayor and Deputy Mayor of the Municipal Executive, Ward Chairpersons and four persons elected from each Ward.
- Provision for representation of at least two women from each ward in the Municipal Assembly.
- The Federal law is to be applicable to the whole of, or, if required, to any part of Nepal and a State law applicable to the whole of, or as required, to any part of the territory of the State.
- The relation between the Federation, State and Local level is to be based upon principles of cooperation, coexistence and coordination.
- A State is to render assistance in the execution of legal provisions or judicial and administrative decisions or orders of another State.
- Provision of a State to exchange information and consult with another State on matters of common concern and interest, coordinate each other on their activities and legislations and extend mutual assistance.
- A State is to provide, in accordance with its State law, equal security, treatment and facility to residents of another State.
- The Federal Parliament is to make necessary laws in order to maintain coordination between the Federation, State and Local level.
- Prohibition on obstruction to the carriage of goods or extension of services in State or Local levels or by a State or Local level to another State or Local level or on levying of tax, fee or charge thereon or on making any kind of discrimination on the carriage or extension of such services or goods.
- An Inter-State Council is to be formed to settle disputes of political nature between the Federation and State and among the States, consisting of the Prime Minister as its chairperson and Home Minister, Finance Minister and Chief Ministers of the respective States as its members.
- Provision of Various Constitutional Commissions: National Natural Resources and Fiscal Commission, National Women Commission, National Dalit Commission, National Inclusion Commission, Indigenous Nationalities Commission, Madhesi Commission, Tharu Commission and Muslim Commission, in addition to already existing Commissions: Commission for the Investigation of Abuse of Authority, Auditor General, Public Service Commission, Election Commission and National Human Rights Commission.
- No amendment is to be made to the Constitution in manner to be prejudicial to the sovereignty, territorial integrity, independence of Nepal and sovereignty vested in the people.
- In the case of a Bill on Amendment of Constitution being related with alteration in the borders or power of any State, the Speaker or the chairperson of the concerned House is to send that Bill to the State Assembly for its consent, within thirty days after its introduction in the Federal Parliament and such Bill only to be submitted in the Federal Parliament if approved by majority in the State Assembly.
- A Bill to amend or repeal any Article of this Constitution introduced in either House of the Federal Parliament is to be published for information to the general public within thirty days of its introduction in that House.
- A person having the citizenship of Nepal by descent only qualified to be elected, nominated or appointed as president, vice-president, Prime Minister, Chief Justice, Speaker of the House of Representatives, Chief of State, Chief Minister, Speaker of a State Assembly and chief of a security body.
- A citizen of Nepal having a foreign permanent residence permit not being qualified for election, nomination or appointment to an office to be elected, nominated or appointed.
- Appointments to offices of Constitutional Organs and Bodies and Nepalese ambassadors, and special emissaries are to be made on the basis of the principle of inclusion.
- Power to make treaties or agreements being vested in the Federation, in making a treaty or agreement on a matter within the list of State, GoN is to consult the concerned State.
- Power of a State Council of Ministers, with the consent ofGoN, to may make contractual agreements on financial and industrial matters.
- The capital of Nepal to be situated in Kathmandu; the capital of a State is to be decided by two-thirds majority of the concerned State Assembly and until that decision, the business of a State is to be conducted through the place as specified by the Government of Nepal.
- Ipso facto conversion of the Constituent Assembly existing at the time of commencement of the Constitution into the Legislature-Parliament after its commencement, and the term of such Legislature-Parliament is to exist until 7 Magh 2074.
- Continuation of services of Judges working in the courts and officials of the Constitutional bodies, existing at the time of commencement of the Constitution.

== Preamble ==
The preamble of the constitution of Nepal states the follows:

In English:

"We, the Sovereign People of Nepal,

internalizing the people's sovereign right and right to autonomy and self-rule, while maintaining freedom, sovereignty, territorial integrity, national unity, independence and dignity of Nepal,

recalling the glorious history of historic people's movements, armed conflict, dedication and sacrifice undertaken by the Nepalese people at times for the interest of the nation, democracy and progressive changes, and respecting for the martyrs and disappeared and victim citizens,

ending all forms of discrimination and oppression created by the feudalistic, autocratic, centralized, unitary system of governance, protecting and promoting social and cultural solidarity, tolerance and harmony, and unity in diversity by recognizing the multi-ethnic, multi-lingual, multi-religious, multi-cultural and diverse regional characteristics, resolving to build an egalitarian society founded on the proportional inclusive and participatory principles in order to ensure economic equality, prosperity and social justice, by eliminating discrimination based on class, caste, region, language, religion and gender and all forms of caste-based untouchability, and

being committed to socialism based on democratic norms and values including the people's competitive multi-party democratic system of governance, civil liberties, fundamental rights, human rights, adult franchise, periodic elections, full freedom of the press, and independent, impartial and competent judiciary and concept of the rule of law, and build a prosperous nation,

do hereby pass and promulgate this Constitution, through the Constituent Assembly, in order to fulfill the aspirations for sustainable peace, good governance, development and prosperity through the federal, democratic, republican, system of governance."

In Nepali:

" हामी सार्वभौमसत्तासम्पन्न नेपाली जनता;

नेपालको स्वतन्त्रता, सार्वभौमिकता, भौगोलिक अखण्डता, राष्ट्रिय एकता, स्वाधीनता र स्वाभिमानलाई अक्षुण्ण राखी जनताको सार्वभौम अधिकार, स्वायत्तता र स्वशासनको अधिकारलाई आत्मसात् गर्दै;

राष्ट्रहित, लोकतन्त्र र अग्रगामी परिवर्तनका लागि नेपाली जनताले पटक– पटक गर्दै आएका ऐतिहासिक जन आन्दोलन, सशस्त्र संघर्ष, त्याग र बलिदानको गौरवपूर्ण इतिहासलाई स्मरण एवं शहीदहरू तथा बेपत्ता र पीडित नागरिकहरूलाई सम्मान गर्दै;

सामन्ती, निरंकुश, केन्द्रीकृत र एकात्मक राज्यव्यवस्थाले सृजना गरेका सबै प्रकारका विभेद र उत्पीडनको अन्त्य गर्दै;

बहुजातीय, बहुभाषिक, बहुधार्मिक, बहुसांस्कृतिक तथा भौगोलिक विविधतायुक्त विशेषतालाई आत्मसात् गरी विविधताबीचको एकता, सामाजिक सांस्कृतिक ऐक्यबद्धता, सहिष्णुता र सद्भावलाई संरक्षण एवं प्रवर्धन गर्दै; वर्गीय, जातीय, क्षेत्रीय, भाषिक, धार्मिक, लैंगिक विभेद र सबै प्रकारका जातीय छुवाछूतको अन्त्य गरी आर्थिक समानता, समृद्धि र सामाजिक न्याय सुनिश्चित गर्न समानुपातिक समावेशी र सहभागितामूलक सिद्धान्तका आधारमा समतामूलक समाजको निर्माण गर्ने संकल्प गर्दै;

जनताको प्रतिस्पर्धात्मक बहुदलीय लोकतान्त्रिक शासन प्रणाली, नागरिक स्वतन्त्रता, मौलिक अधिकार, मानव अधिकार, बालिग मताधिकार, आवधिक निर्वाचन, पूर्ण प्रेस स्वतन्त्रता तथा स्वतन्त्र, निष्पक्ष र सक्षम न्यायपालिका र कानूनी राज्यको अवधारणा लगायतका लोकतान्त्रिक मूल्य र मान्यतामा आधारित समाजवादप्रति प्रतिबद्ध रही समृद्ध राष्ट्र निर्माण गर्न;

संघीय लोकतान्त्रिक गणतन्त्रात्मक शासन व्यवस्थाको माध्यमद्वारा दिगो शान्ति, सुशासन, विकास र समृद्धिको आकांक्षा पूरा गर्न संविधान सभाबाट पारित गरी यो संविधान जारी गर्दछौं । "

== Previous constitutions ==
In the 68-year history of constitutional development up to this Constitution, Nepal experienced six different constitutions in different time periods, with previous constitutions being enacted in 1948, 1951, 1959, 1962, 1990, and 2007.

=== The Nepal Government Act 1948 ===
In 2004 Bikram Sambat, the Government of Nepal Act was enacted. Since the mid-nineteenth century, the country had been a monarchy where the prime ministers, from the Rana dynasty, had sweeping control over the affairs of the state. The 1948 (Common Era) document introduced limited democratic elements, but the experiment was not successful due to the misgivings of the Rana rulers to give away power. This constitution was declared on 26 January 1948 by PM Padma Shumsher. The constitution was formed under the chairmanship of Padma Shumsher and three Indian Scholars had helped him to prepare this document. The three Indian Scholars who contributed during its writing were Prakash Gupta, Raghunath Singh and Ram Ugra Singh. It consisted of 6 parts, 68 articles and 1 schedule.

=== Nepal Interim Government Act 1951 ===
The Interim Government of Nepal Act 1951 was promulgated after the Revolution of 1951 at the end of the Rana period. This text strengthened the authority of the king and introduced relevant reforms such as the creation of the Supreme Court and the inclusion of fundamental rights and socio-economic goals to be pursued by the state. This constitution was promulgated on 11 April 1951 by King Tribhuvan. It consisted of 7 parts, 73 articles and 3 schedule.

=== Constitution of the Kingdom of Nepal, 1959 ===
The Constitution of the Kingdom of Nepal, 1959 followed the previously mentioned interim text. Despite the establishment of a bicameral parliament, the king continued to hold important powers such as the prerogative to appoint half of the members of the Senate and the suspension of parliament under certain circumstances. This constitution was drafted under the chairmanship of Bhagawati Pd Singh. The constitution drafting commission included members like Surya Pd Upadhyaya, Ranabir Subba, Hari Prashad Joshi. Sir Ivor Jennings was an advisor in this committee. This constitution was promulgated on 12 February 1959. It consisted of 10 parts, 77 articles and 3 schedules.

=== Constitution of Nepal 1962 ===
The democratic experiment was short-lived, as in 1962 a new constitution came in to eliminate political parties, and to introduce the panchayat system. In this model, panchayats were councils organized at the local level, presumably to ensure the representation of citizens. However, the king exercised much stronger authority than in the 1959 regime and could modify the constitution or suspend it in case of emergency. This constitution was promulgated on 16 December 1962 by King Mahendra. It consisted of 20 parts, 97 articles and 6 schedules.

=== Constitution of the Kingdom of Nepal, 1990 ===
In 1990, the first Jana Andolan, Popular Revolt, brought multi-party democracy back to Nepal. The Constitution of the Kingdom of Nepal, 1990 lifted the ban on political parties, described a democratic representative system where the authority of the king was curtailed, and enshrined fundamental rights. Although the 1990 constitution substantially increased the democratic character of the state in comparison with the Panchayat Regime, critiques have argued that this text did not adequately represent all sectors of society even though Nepal was a multi-cultural country where diverse social groups coexist. This constitution was promulgated on 9 November 1990 by King Birendra. It consisted of 23 parts, 133 articles and 3 schedules. This constitution was repealed by the current constitution of Nepal.

=== The Interim Constitution of Nepal, 2007 ===
Again following the 2007 democracy movement in Nepal, The Interim Constitution of Nepal was promulgated in 2007. This constitution was promulgated on 15 January 2007. It consisted of 25 parts, 167 articles and 4 schedules. It has articles on citizenship, fundamental rights, responsibilities, directive principles and policies of the State, the Executive, Legislature-Parliament, the Constituent Assembly, the legislative procedure, the financial procedure, the Judiciary, the Commission for the Investigation of Abuse of Authority, the Auditor General, the Public Service Commission, the Election Commission, the National Human Rights Commission, the Attorney General, structure of State and local self-governance, political parties, emergency powers, provisions regarding the army, amendment of the Constitution and transitional provisions.

== Parts ==
The Constitution has 35 parts:

1. Preliminary
2. Citizenship
3. Fundamental Rights and Duties
4. Directive Principles, Policies, and Responsibilities of the State
5. Structure of State and Distribution of State Power
6. President and Vice-president
7. Federal Executive
8. Federal Legislature
9. Federal Legislative Procedure
10. Federal Financial Procedures
11. Judiciary
12. Attorney General
13. Provincial Executive
14. Provincial Legislature
15. Provincial Legislative Procedure
16. Financial Procedures of Province
17. Local Executive
18. Local Legislature
19. Local Financial Procedure
20. Interrelationship between the Federation, Provinces and Local Levels
21. Commission for the Investigation of Abuse of Authority
22. Auditor General
23. Public Service Commission
24. Election Commission
25. National Human Rights Commission
26. National Natural Resources and Fiscal Commission
27. Other Commissions
28. Provision regarding National Security
29. Provision relating to Political Parties
30. Emergency Power
31. Amendment of the Constitution
32. Miscellaneous
33. Transitional Provisions
34. Definitions and Interpretations
35. Short title, Commencement and Repeal

== Citizenship Provisions ==
The conditions to be fulfilled to be a Nepalese Citizen are outlined below (Copied from Section 11, Part 2, Constitution of Nepal, 2015) (final)

(1) The persons who have acquired citizenship of Nepal at the commencement of this Constitution and the persons who are eligible to acquire citizenship of Nepal under this Part shall be deemed to be the citizens of Nepal.

(2) The following persons who have their permanent domicile in Nepal shall be deemed to be citizens of Nepal by descent:-

1. A person who has acquired the citizenship of Nepal by descent before the commencement of this constitution.
2. Any person whose father or mother was a citizen of Nepal at the birth of such a person.

(3) A child of a citizen who has acquired citizenship of Nepal by birth before the commencement of this Constitution shall, if his/her father and mother both are the citizens of Nepal, shall be entitled to Nepali citizenship by descent upon his/her attaining the age of maturity.

(4) Every child found in Nepal whereabouts of whose paternity and maternity is not known shall, until the mother or father is traced, be deemed a citizen of Nepal by descent.

(5) A person born to a Nepali citizen mother and having his/her domicile in Nepal but whose father is not traced, shall be conferred the Nepali citizenship by descent.

Provided that in case his/her father is found to be a foreigner, the citizenship of such a person shall be converted to naturalized citizenship according to the Federal law.

(6) If a foreign woman married to a Nepali citizen so wishes, she may acquire naturalized citizenship of Nepal as provided for in a Federal law.

(7) Notwithstanding anything contained elsewhere in this Article, in case of a person born to Nepali woman citizen married to a foreign citizen, he/she may acquire naturalized citizenship of Nepal as provided for by a Federal law if he/she is having the permanent domicile in Nepal and he/she has not acquired citizenship of the foreign country.

Provided that if his/her father and mother both are the citizen of Nepal at the time of acquisition of the citizenship, he/she, if born in Nepal, may acquire citizenship by descent.

(8) Except provided for in this Article, Government of Nepal may confer naturalized citizenship of Nepal according to Federal law.

(9) Government of Nepal may confer honorary citizenship according to Federal law.

(10) In case any area is annexed into Nepal by merger, the persons having domicile in such area shall be citizens of Nepal subject to a Federal law.

== Fundamental rights guaranteed in the Constitution (Part 3) ==
There are 31 fundamental rights guaranteed by the constitution of Nepal in part -3 (Fundamental Rights and Duties). They are

1. Right to Live with Dignity (Article 16)
2. Right to Freedom (Article 17)
3. Right to Equality (Article 18)
4. Right to Communication (Article 19)
5. Rights relating to Justice (Article 20)
6. Right of Victim of Crime (Article 21)
7. Right against Torture (Article 22)
8. Right against Preventive Detention (Article 23)
9. Right against Untouchability and Discrimination (Article 24)
10. Right relating to Property (Article 25)
11. Right to Freedom of Religion (Article 26)
12. Right to Information (Article 27)
13. Right to Privacy (Article 28)
14. Right against Exploitation (Article 29)
15. Right to Clean Environment (Article 30)
16. Right relating to Education (Article 31)
17. Right to Language and Culture (Article 32)
18. Right to Employment (Article 33)
19. Right to Labour (Article 34)
20. Right relating to Health (Article 35)
21. Right relating to Food (Article 36)
22. Right to Housing (Article 37)
23. Rights of Women (Article 38)
24. Rights of the Child (Article 39)
25. Rights of Dalit (Article 40)
26. Rights of Senior Citizens (Article 41)
27. Right to Social Justice (Article 42)
28. Right to Social Security (Article 43)
29. Right of the Consumer (Article 44)
30. Right against Exile (Article 45)
31. Right to Constitutional Remedies (Article 46)

== Constitutional organs ==
The constitutional organs of Nepal form Part 21-27:

1. Commission for the Investigation of Abuse of Authority (CIAA) (Part 21)
2. Office of the Auditor General (Part 22)
3. Public Service Commission (Part 23)
4. Election Commission (Part 24)
5. National Human Rights Commission (Part 25)
6. National Natural Resources and Fiscal Commission (Part 26)
7. Other Commissions (Part 27) :
  1. National Women Commission
  2. National Dalit Commission
  3. National Inclusion Commission
  4. National Aborigines Commission
  5. Madhesi Commission
  6. Tharu Commission
  7. Muslim Commission

== Schedules ==
The Constitution has 9 schedules:

1. Nepali National Flag
2. National Anthem of Nepal
3. Coat of Arms of Nepal
4. Provinces and Districts within provinces
5. List of Federal Powers/Jurisdiction
6. List of Provincial Powers/Jurisdiction
7. List of Concurrent (federal and provincial) powers/jurisdiction
8. List of Powers/Jurisdiction for Local Level
9. List of Concurrent Powers/Jurisdiction for Federation, Province and Local Level

== See also ==
- 2nd Nepalese Constituent Assembly
- Constitutionalism
- 2015 Nepal blockade
- Constitution of Nepal (Second Amendment 2077)
- Constitution Council
