= Flag of Nepal =

- नेपालको झण्डा
- Use: National flag
- Proportion: see below
- Adopted: 16 December 1962; 63 years ago
- Design: Two juxtaposed triangular figures creating an irregular pentagon consists of a red field surrounded by a blue border, there being a white emblem of the crescent moon with eight rays visible out of sixteen in the upper part and a white emblem of a twelve rayed sun in the lower part
- Designed by: Shankar Nath Rimal (1962)

The national flag of Nepal is a concave pentagonal flag of red, white, and blue colour. It is used as both the state and civil flag of Nepal. It is the only non-rectangular national flag in the world and the only one that is taller than it is wide. The flag's unique shape is a combination of two single pennants, and is known as a double-pennon. The red colour of the field represents bravery and Nepal's national flower, the rhododendron, while the blue colour of the border represents peace.

The current flag was adopted on 16 December 1962, along with the formation of a new constitutional government. Shankar Nath Rimal, a civil engineer, standardised the flag on the request of King Mahendra. It borrows from the original, traditional design, used throughout the 19th and 20th centuries, and is a combination of the two individual pennons used by rival branches of the ruling dynasty. Until 1962, the flag's emblems, both the sun and the crescent moon, had human faces, but they were removed to modernise the flag.

== History ==
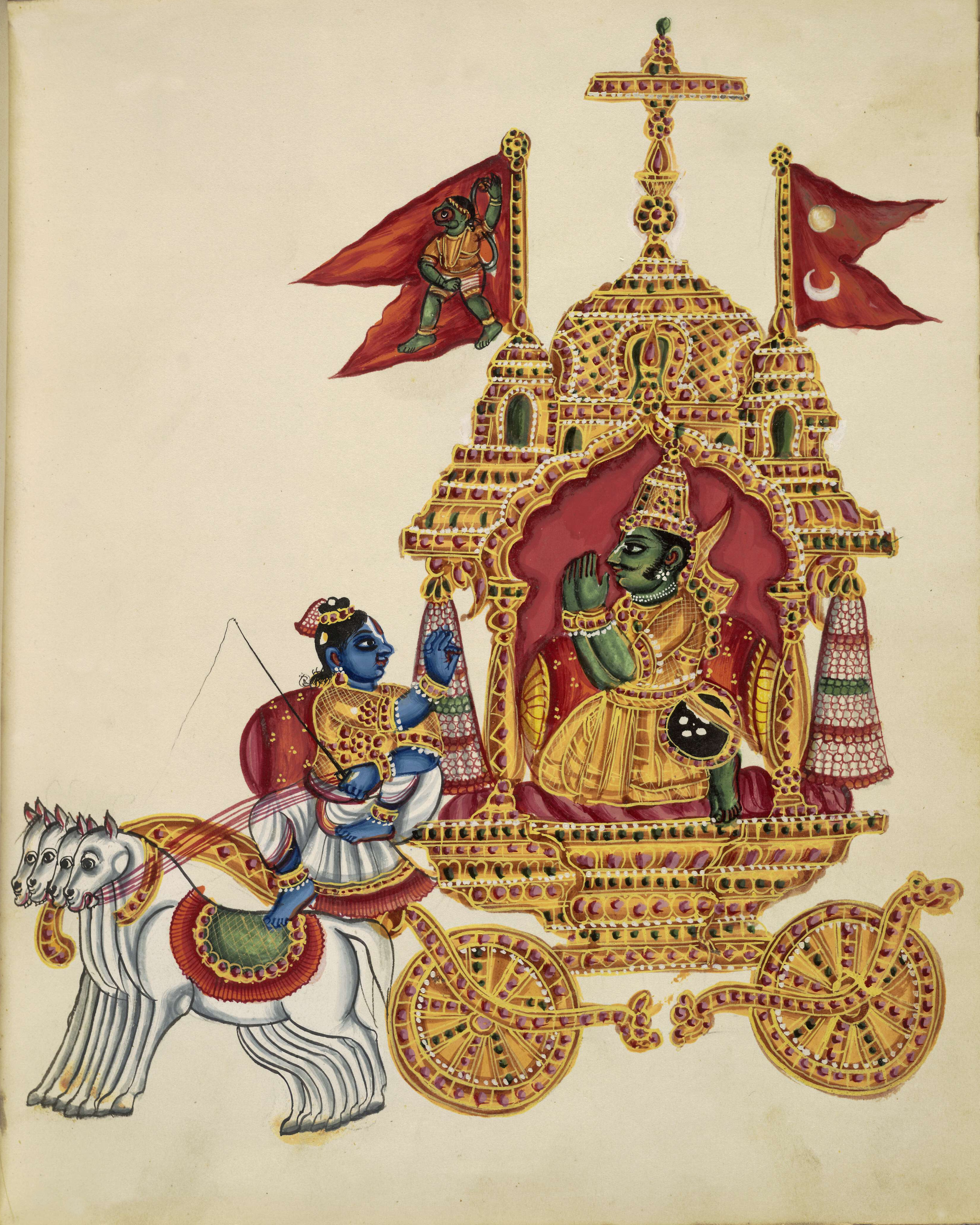
A similar (right) flag used in the Mahabharata; chariot with Krishna and Arjuna during the Kurukshetra War; traditionally the Nepalese monarchs were Hindu and considered the reincarnation of Vishnu

Flag of Nepal (1856–c. 1930)

Flag of Nepal (c. 1930—1962)

Historically, triangular shaped flags in South Asia were very common, since it was compact in size so the flag furled even with the lowest wind, thus making it visible over long distances. The traces of triangular flags could be found in Hinduism. The flag's history is vague and there are no specific accounts of its creator. Nepal has historically used both quadrilateral flags as well as non-quadrilateral flags throughout its history.

The flags of almost all states in South Asia were once triangular. A 1928 French book about Nepal shows a double pennant flag with a green border rather than the modern blue. There are other forms of pennant-type flags, mostly used in Hindu and Buddhist temples around Nepal. Many accounts date the creation of the double-pennant to King Prithvi Narayan Shah. The flag of the ancient Gorkha Kingdom started off as a single triangular war banner of the Shah kings with a red colour and with various deities and other symbols as symbols in the flag. After Prithvi Narayan Shah unified all small principalities of Nepal, the double-pennon flag became the standard flag. According to some historians, the Rana Prime Minister Jung Bahadur Rana changed the sun and moon symbols into faces of the sun and moon symbolizing the kings as the Rajputs of Lunar dynasty and the Rana themselves as the Rajputs of the Solar dynasty. Nepal has simply maintained its ancient tradition, while every other state has adopted a rectangular or square version in the European vexillological tradition.

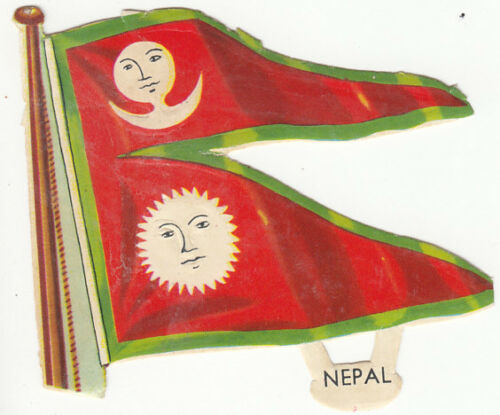
The flag of Nepal (1927–1930)

The present flag of Nepal was adopted under the Nepalese constitution adopted on 16 December 1962. The modern flag seems to be a combination of the ancient Mustang Kingdom's flag and the ongoing flag used by the former Gorkha Kingdom. The colour gradients have been adopted from the Mustang Kingdom. Prior to 1962, both symbols on the flag, the sun and moon, had human faces. The constitution dedicated an entire section to the precise size and shape of the flag, since people were drawing it incorrectly. This section is continued even today even though multiple constitutions were introduced in the country during the period.

In May 2008 during the drafting of the new constitution, various political parties demanded changes to the flag's design since it symbolized Hinduism and monarchy, but this proposal was rejected.

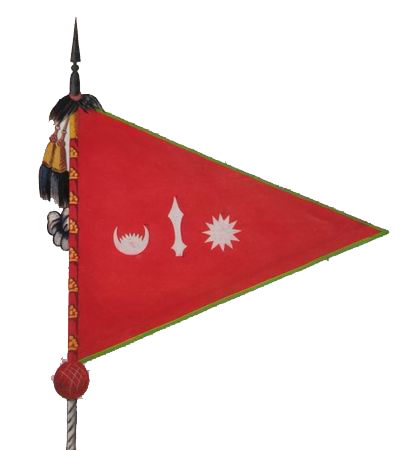
Sabuj Battalion flag, used during Nepal-Tibet War, the Nepal-British War and both World Wars

== Symbolism ==
In modern times, the flag's symbolism has evolved to incorporate several meanings. The crimson red indicates the bravery of Nepali people (and is the country's national color) and the blue border represents peace and harmony. The colors are often found in Nepalese decoration and works of art. One popular interpretation is that the symbols of the moon and sun represent peace and hard work, respectively.

The ruling dynasties in the region historically used similar triangular pennants, even before Nepal was established. These Hindu religious banners, called "dhvaja", inspired the current design. The World Factbook gives another modern interpretation of the moon and the sun as symbols of Hinduism and Buddhism, the main religions of the country.

The inclusion of the celestial bodies indicates Nepal's permanence and the hope that Nepal will enjoy the same longevity as the Sun and the Moon. The moon also symbolizes the cool weather of the Himalayas, whereas the sun symbolizes the heat and the high temperature of the southern lowlands (Terai). Additionally, the stylized moon represents the calm demeanor and purity of spirit of the Nepali people, while the stylized sun represents their fierce resolve.

== Flag layout ==
A precise geometrical description of the Nepalese national flag was specified in Article 5, Schedule 1 of the former constitution of the Kingdom of Nepal, adopted on 9 November 1990. Schedule 1 of the Constitution of Nepal, adopted on 20 September 2015, details a specific method of making the national flag of Nepal.

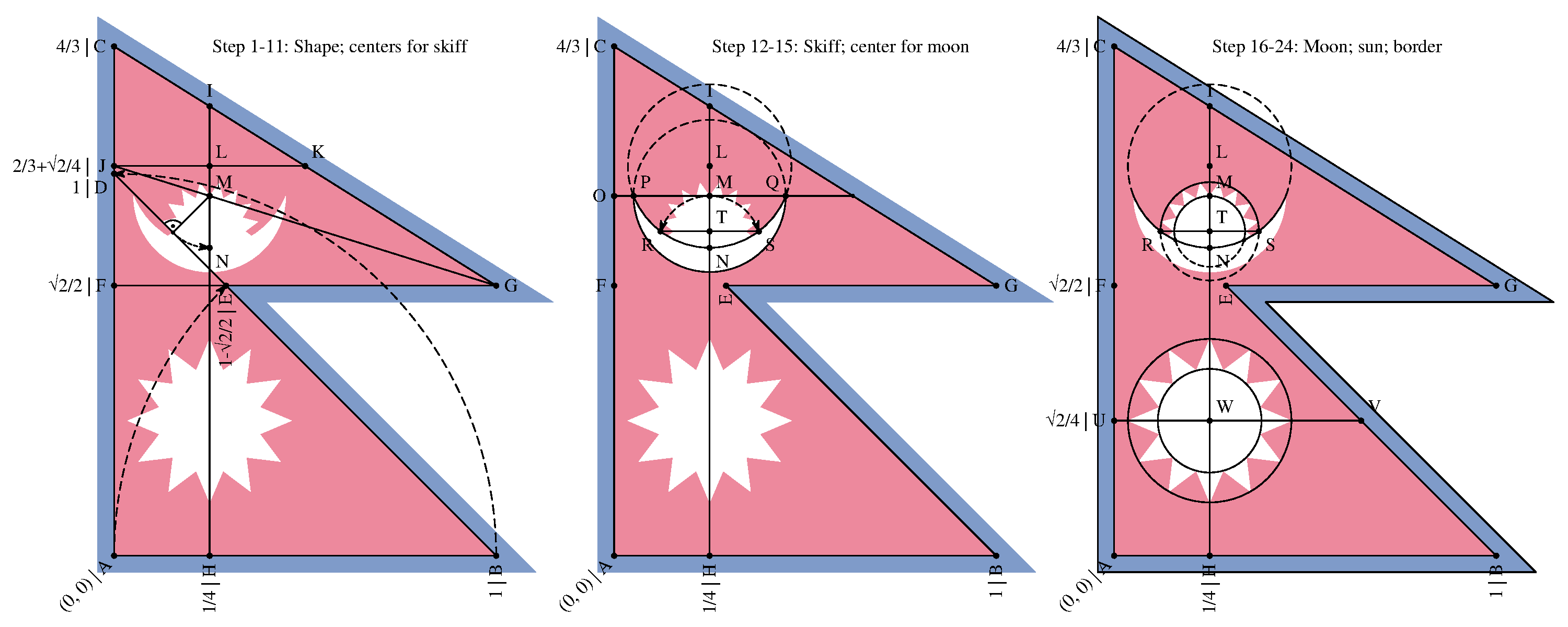
Overview about the construction of Nepal's flag

=== Aspect ratio ===
When constructed according to the stated geometric construction law, the ratio of the height of the flag to the longest width is an irrational number. This is common for the hypotenuse of triangles.

$4506606337686:6136891429688 - 306253616715\sqrt{2} - \sqrt{118-48 \sqrt{2}} \left( 934861968 + 20332617192 \sqrt{2} \right)$ ≈ 1:1.21901033… (OEIS: A230582).

This ratio is the least root of the quartic polynomial
$$243356742235044 r^4 - 1325568548812608 r^3 + 2700899847521244 r^2 - 2439951444086880 r + 824634725389225,$$
and arises from the addition of the blue border after construction of the red field. The bounding rectangle of the red field alone has the rational aspect ratio 3:4 (=1:1.333…).

== Non-standard versions ==
White rectangular flag with the national flag's design at the hoist, used occasionally, such as at the 2016 Olympics.

The shape of the flag is unique among sovereign nations, which has made it difficult to accommodate in large-scale international uses. For example, a protocol established for the Olympic Games in 2004 specified that all flags should be manufactured as rectangles with a 2:3 aspect ratio, for uniformity. During the 2016 Summer Olympics, it was common for the flag to be printed with a white background, to expand it to a rectangular shape. The protocol manual for the 2020 Summer Olympics, by contrast, named Nepal as the only exception to the standard size requirement, instead requiring its flag to be the same height as the other flags.

During a 2018 visit of the Indian Prime Minister Narendra Modi to Janakpur, a version of the flag with incorrect shape and geometrical proportions, such as a thicker blue border, was flown by officials, causing outrage on social media and with national personnel.

== See also ==
- List of flags of Nepal
- Emblem of Nepal
- Largest Human Flag of Nepal
- Timeline of Nepalese history
