= Emblem of Nepal =

Versions
- Alternative version
- Armiger: Federal Democratic Republic of Nepal
- Adopted: 28 May 2008 (modified in 2020)
- Motto: जननी जन्मभूमिश्च स्वर्गादपि गरीयसी ('Mother and Motherland are greater than Heaven')

The national emblem of Nepal (Nepali: नेपालको राष्ट्रिय प्रतीक चिन्ह, romanized: Nepālko Rāṣṭriya Pratīk Cinha) is the primary symbol used by the Government of Nepal and its agencies. Officially adopted on 28 May 2008, the emblem was later modified in 2020 to incorporate a revised political map of Nepal.

The updated design includes the country's territorial claims over the Kalapani territory, Lipulekh Pass, and Limpiyadhura, which were added to Nepal’s official map. This change was reflected in the emblem on 13 June 2020.

The emblem features Mount Everest, green hills symbolizing the hilly regions, and the yellow background representing the fertile Terai plains. It also includes the hands of a man and a woman joined together, symbolizing gender equality, with a wreath of rhododendron—the national flower—around it.

An alternative version of the emblem, used in some instances, presents slight stylistic differences, especially in the depiction of the map and the national flower.

== Features ==
It contains the flag of Nepal, Mount Everest, green hills symbolising the hilly regions of Nepal and yellow colour symbolising the fertile Terai region, a man's and a woman's hands joining to symbolise gender equality, and a garland of Rhododendron (the national flower) also called Lali Guransh (लाली गुराँश). Atop this is a white silhouette in the shape of Nepal.

=== Motto ===
At the base of the design a red scroll carries the national motto in Sanskrit: जननी जन्मभूमिश्च स्वर्गादपी गरीयसी (Jananī Janmabhūmiśca svargādapi garīyasī), which translates as 'Mother and Motherland are greater than Heaven.'

The phrase below was quoted by Rama when his brother Lakshmana expresses desire to stay back in Lanka.

Nepali original

अपि स्वर्णमयी लंका न मे लक्ष्मण रोचते ।
जननी जन्मभूमिश्च स्वर्गादपि गरीयसी ।।

English translation

I care not for Lanka, Lakshmana, be it of gold.
Mother and motherland are greater than heaven.

== Historical arms ==
Before 28 May 2008, the modern emblem was preceded by an arms of dominion of the monarch, generally consisting of a white cow, a green pheasant, two Gurkha soldiers (one carrying a kukri and a bow; the other a rifle), peaks of the Himalayas, two crossed Nepalese flags and kukris, the footprints of Gorakhnath (the guardian deity of the Gurkhas), and the royal headdress. It also contained the same red scroll with the national motto. From 1935 to 1962, the arms also bore the secondary motto in Latin: Dulce et decorum est pro patria mori.

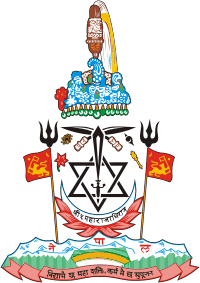
Coat of arms of the Gorkha Kingdom under the Shah dynasty

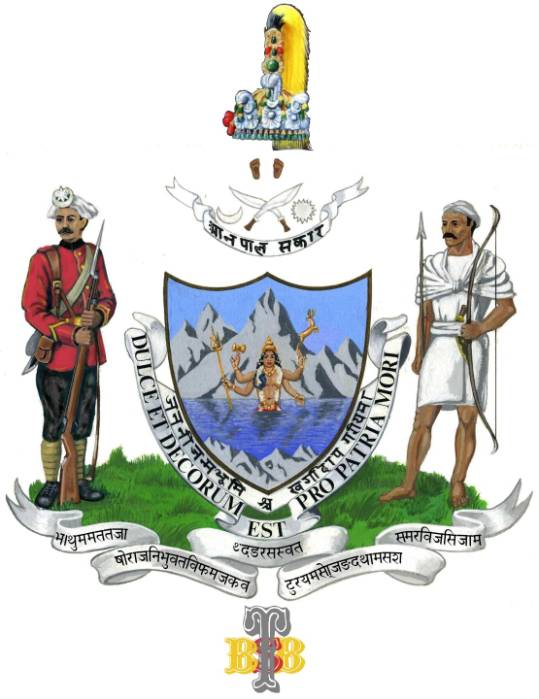
Coat of arms of the Kingdom of Nepal (1935)

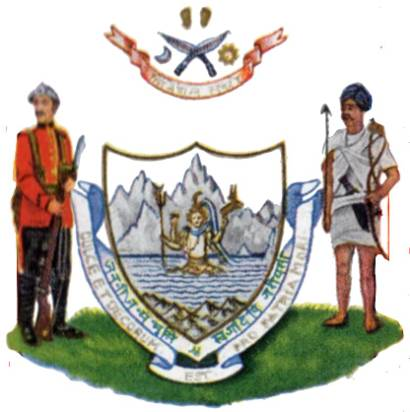
Coat of arms of the Kingdom of Nepal (1935–1946)

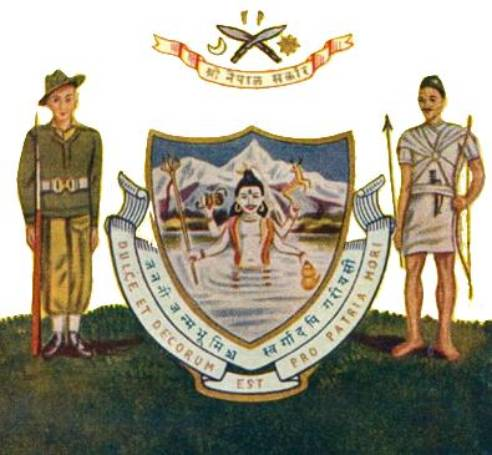
Coat of arms of the Kingdom of Nepal (1946–1962)

Coat of arms of the Kingdom of Nepal (1962–2008)

Emblem of Nepal

== Subnational emblems ==
Nepal is divided into seven provinces, each of which have adopted a distinctive emblem.

== See also ==
- Flag of Nepal
- Largest Human Flag of Nepal
- Janani Janmabhumishcha Swargadapi Gariyasi
- "Sayaun Thunga Phulka"
- List of Nepalese province emblems
