= Minister of Finance (Nepal) =

Head of the Ministry of Home Affairs

Minister of Finance Affairs
- अर्थ मन्त्री
- Emblem of Nepal

- Flag of Nepal
- Incumbent; Swarnim Wagle since 27 March 2026
- Style: His Excellency
- Member of: Council of Ministers
- Reports to: Prime Minister
- Nominator: Prime Minister
- Appointer: The president
- Term length: No fixed term
- Formation: 21 February 1951; 75 years ago

The minister of finance (or simply, the finance minister, ( Nepali: अर्थ मन्त्री ) is the head of the Ministry of Finance of the Government of Nepal. One of the senior-most officers in the Federal Cabinet, the finance minister is responsible for the fiscal policy of the government. A key duty of the finance minister is to present the annual federal budget in Parliament, detailing the government's plan for taxation and spending in the coming financial year. Through the budget, the finance minister also outlines allocations to all the ministries and departments. The minister is assisted by the minister of state for finance and the junior deputy minister of finance.

The current minister is Dr. Swarnim Wagle who took office on 27 March 2026.

== List of ministers of finance ==
=== Kingdom of Nepal ===
This is a list of all former finance ministers of the Kingdom of Nepal and their appointments until 2008:

1. Subarna Shamsher Rana, February 1951
2. Kaiser Shumsher Jung Bahadur Rana, 1952
3. Matrika Prasad Koirala, June 1953
4. S. Gunjaman Singh, January 1957
5. C. B. Singh, July 1957
6. Subarna Shamsher Rana, May 1958
7. Rishikesh Shah, December 1960
8. Surya Bahadur Thapa, July 1962
9. Surendra Bahadur Basnet, September 1968
10. Kirti Nidhi Bista, April 1969
11. Gehendra Bahadur Rajbhandari, April 1970
12. Kirti Nidhi Bista, April 1971
13. Bhekh Bahadur Thapa, July 1973
14. Ram Prasad Rajbahak, April 1979
15. Surya Bahadur Thapa, May 1979
16. Yadav Pant, June 1980
17. Prakash Chandra Lohani, July 1983
18. Bharat Bahadur Thapa, March 1986
19. Pashupati Shamsher Jang Bahadur Rana, April 1990
20. Devendra Raj Pandey, April 1990
21. Girija Prasad Koirala, May 1991
22. Mahesh Acharya, December 1991
23. Bharat Mohan Adhikari, November 1994
24. Ram Saran Mahat, September 1995
25. Rabindra Nath Sharma, March 1997
26. Ram Saran Mahat, April 1998
27. Bharat Mohan Adhikari, December 1998
28. Mahesh Acharya, May 1999
29. Ram Saran Mahat, July 2001
30. Badri Prasad Shrestha, October 2003
31. Prakash Chandra Lohani, June 2003
32. Bharat Mohan Adhikari, June 2004
33. Madhukar Shamsher Rana, February 2005

=== Transition phase of Nepal ===
This is a list of finance ministers of the Nepal during its transition phase (2008 - 2013):

SN	Name	Party	Assumed office	Left office
1	Baburam Bhattarai	Communist Party of Nepal (Maoist Centre)	18 August 2008	25 May 2009
2	Surendra Pandey	Communist Party of Nepal (Unified Marxist–Leninist)	25 May 2009	6 February 2011
3	Bharat Mohan Adhikari	Communist Party of Nepal (Unified Marxist–Leninist)	6 February 2011	4 September 2011
4	Barsaman Pun	Communist Party of Nepal (Maoist Centre)	4 September 2011	March 2013
5	Shanker Prasad Koirala	independent	18 March 2013	11 February 2014

=== Since 2013 ===
This is a list of all finance ministers since the Nepalese Constituent Assembly election in 2013:

SN	Name	Party	Assumed office	Left office
1	Ram Saran Mahat	Nepali Congress	25 February 2014	12 October 2015
2	Bishnu Prasad Paudel	Communist Party of Nepal (Unified Marxist–Leninist)	5 November 2015	1 August 2016
3	Krishna Bahadur Mahara	Communist Party of Nepal (Maoist Centre)	4 August 2016	31 May 2017
4	Gyanendra Bahadur Karki	Nepali Congress	7 June 2017	15 February 2018
5	Yuba Raj Khatiwada (Note: Khatiwada had to resign from his ministerial posts on 3 March 2020, as his two-year term in the Rastriya Sabha ended, however he was reappointed only on the next day.)	Communist Party of Nepal (NCP)	16 March 2018	4 September 2020
6	Bishnu Prasad Paudel	CPN UML	14 October 2020	13 July 2021
7	Janardan Sharma	CPN (Maoist)	13 July 2021	7 July 2022
8	Sher Bahadur Deuba	Nepali Congress	7 July 2022	31 July 2022
9	Janardan Sharma	CPN (Maoist)	31 July 2022	26 December 2022
10	Bishnu Prasad Paudel	CPN UML	26 December 2022	27 February 2023
11	Dr. Prakash Sharan Mahat	Nepali Congress	31 March 2023	
12	Barshaman Pun	CPN (Maoist)	6 March 2024	
13	Bishnu Prasad Paudel	CPN UML	15 July 2024	12 September 2025
14	Rameshwor Prasad Khanal	Independent	15 September 2025	27 March 2026
15	Dr. Swarnim Wagle	Rastriya Swatantra Party	27 March 2026	
