= Khanal cabinet =

Government of Nepal in 2011

- Cabinet of Nepal
- February 2011–August 2011
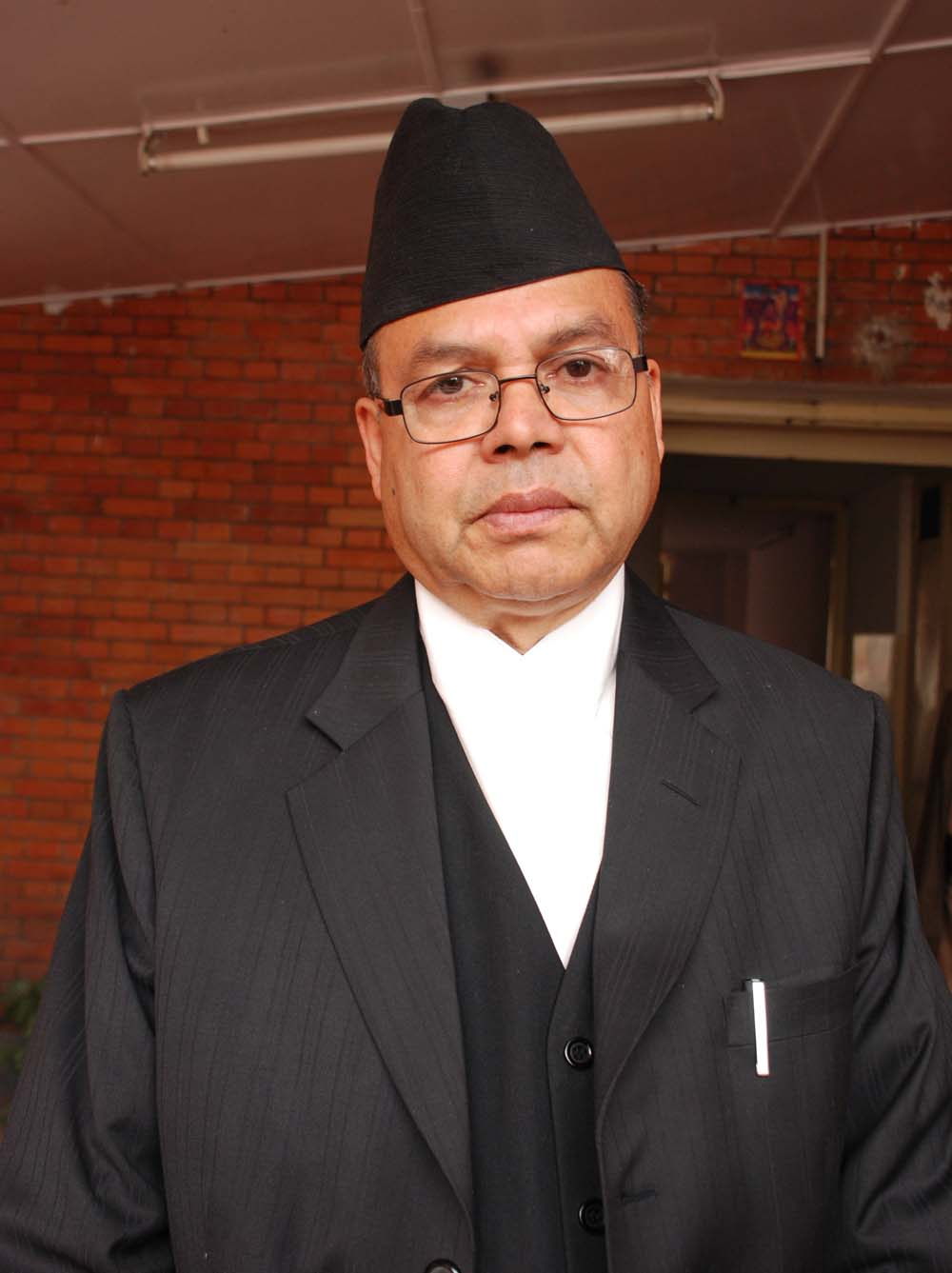
- Date formed: 6 February 2011
- Date dissolved: 29 August 2011

People and organisations
- President: Ram Baran Yadav
- Prime Minister: Jhala Nath Khanal
- Deputy Prime Minister: Bharat Mohan Adhikari; Upendra Yadav; Krishna Bahadur Mahara; Narayan Kaji Shrestha
- Total no. of members: 47 appointments
- Member party: CPN (UML); UCPN (Maoist); MFJN
- Status in legislature: Majority (coalition)
- Opposition party: Nepali Congress
- Opposition leader: Ram Chandra Paudel

History
- Election: 2008
- Legislature term: 2008–2012
- Predecessor: Madhav Nepal cabinet
- Successor: Bhattarai cabinet

The Jhala Nath Khanal cabinet was formed on 6 February 2011 after Jhala Nath Khanal of the CPN (UML) was appointed as prime minister. The cabinet was expanded on 11 April with members from his own party and on 4 May with members from coalition partners UCPN (Maoist) and Madheshi Jana Adhikar Forum, Nepal. The cabinet was reshuffled on 1 August 2011.

== Election of the Prime Minister ==
3 February 2011 9th Session Constituent Assembly Absolute majority (301/601) required
Constituent Assembly
Candidate's Name	Party	Votes
Jhala Nath Khanal	CPN (UML)	368 / 601
Ram Chandra Poudel	Nepali Congress	122 / 601
Pushpa Kamal Dahal	CPN (Maoist)	Candidate not nominated
Bijay Kumar Gachhadar	MFJN (Loktantrik)	67 / 601

== Cabinet ==
Portfolio	Minister	Party	Took office	Left office
Prime Minister of Nepal	Jhala Nath Khanal	CPN (UML)	6 February 2011	29 August 2011
Deputy Prime Minister of Nepal; Minister for Finance	Bharat Mohan Adhikari	CPN (UML)	17 March 2011	29 August 2011
Minister for Commerce and Supply	Bharat Mohan Adhikari	CPN (UML)	17 March 2011	16 May 2011
Minister for Energy; Minister for Irrigation	Bharat Mohan Adhikari	CPN (UML)	17 March 2011	11 April 2011
Deputy Prime Minister of Nepal; Minister for Home Affairs	Narayan Kaji Shrestha	UCPN (Maoist)	1 August 2011	29 August 2011
Deputy Prime Minister of Nepal	Krishna Bahadur Mahara	UCPN (Maoist)	10 March 2011	1 August 2011
Minister for Information and Communications; Minister for Law and Justice; Minister for Land Reform and Management; Minister for Health and Population	Krishna Bahadur Mahara	UCPN (Maoist)	10 March 2011	4 May 2011
Minister for Home Affairs	Krishna Bahadur Mahara	UCPN (Maoist)	4 May 2011	1 August 2011
Deputy Prime Minister of Nepal; Minister for Foreign Affairs	Upendra Yadav	MJF-N	4 May 2011	29 August 2011
Minister for Commerce and Supply	Upendra Yadav	MJF-N	16 May 2011	1 August 2011
Minister for Defence	Bishnu Prasad Paudel	CPN (UML)	7 March 2011	29 August 2011
Minister for Environment	Bishnu Prasad Paudel	CPN (UML)	17 March 2011	4 May 2011
Minister for General Administration; Minister for Forests and Soil Conservation	Bishnu Prasad Paudel	CPN (UML)	17 March 2011	11 April 2011
Minister for Physical Planning and Works	Top Bahadur Rayamajhi	UCPN (Maoist)	10 March 2011	29 August 2011
Minister for Labour and Transportation Management	Top Bahadur Rayamajhi	UCPN (Maoist)	10 March 2011	4 May 2011
Minister for Information and Communications	Agni Prasad Sapkota	UCPN (Maoist)	4 May 2011	1 August 2011
Minister for Information and Communications	Post Bahadur Bogati	UCPN (Maoist)	1 August 2011	29 August 2011
Minister for Health and Population	Shakti Bahadur Basnet	UCPN (Maoist)	4 May 2011	1 August 2011
Minister for Health and Population	Lokendra Bista	UCPN (Maoist)	1 August 2011	29 August 2011
Minister for Peace and Reconstruction; Minister for Youth and Sports	Barsaman Pun	UCPN (Maoist)	10 March 2011	4 May 2011
Minister for Tourism and Civil Aviation	Khadga Bahadur Bishwakarma	UCPN (Maoist)	10 March 2011	29 August 2011
Minister for Women, Children and Social Welfare	Khadga Bahadur Bishwakarma	UCPN (Maoist)	10 March 2011	4 May 2011
Minister for Local Development	Urmila Aryal	CPN (UML)	11 April 2011	29 August 2011
Minister for Education	Ganga Lal Tuladhar	CPN (UML)	7 March 2011	29 August 2011
Minister for Science and Technology	Ganga Lal Tuladhar	CPN (UML)	17 March 2011	1 August 2011
Minister for Constituent Assembly, Federal Affairs, Parliamentary System and Culture	Ganga Lal Tuladhar	CPN (UML)	17 March 2011	4 May 2011
Minister for Local Development	Ganga Lal Tuladhar	CPN (UML)	17 March 2011	11 April 2011
Minister for Irrigation	Raghubir Mahaseth	CPN (UML)	11 April 2011	29 August 2011
Minister for Energy	Gokarna Bista	CPN (UML)	11 April 2011	29 August 2011
Minister for Forests and Soil Conservation	Bhanu Bhakta Joshi	CPN (UML)	11 April 2011	29 August 2011
Minister without portfolio	Ghanashyam Bhusal	CPN (UML)	4 May 2011	29 August 2011
Minister for General Administration	Yubaraj Karki	CPN (UML)	11 April 2011	29 August 2011
Minister for Peace and Reconstruction	Bishwa Nath Shah	UCPN (Maoist)	4 May 2011	1 August 2011
Minister for Peace and Reconstruction	Pampha Bhusal	UCPN (Maoist)	1 August 2011	29 August 2011
Minister for Women, Children and Social Welfare	Jaypuri Gharti	UCPN (Maoist)	4 May 2011	29 August 2011
Minister for Land Reform and Management	Ramcharan Chaudhari	UCPN (Maoist)	4 May 2011	1 August 2011
Minister for Land Reform and Management	Hisila Yami	UCPN (Maoist)	1 August 2011	29 August 2011
Minister for Science and Technology	Lekh Raj Bhatta	UCPN (Maoist)	1 August 2011	29 August 2011
Minister for Law and Justice	Prabhu Sah	UCPN (Maoist)	4 May 2011	29 August 2011
Minister for Industry	Mahendra Paswan	UCPN (Maoist)	4 May 2011	29 August 2011
Minister for Youth and Sports	Hit Bahadur Tamang	UCPN (Maoist)	4 May 2011	1 August 2011
Minister for Youth and Sports	Onsari Gharti Magar	UCPN (Maoist)	1 August 2011	29 August 2011
Minister for Environment	Sunil Kumar Manandhar	UCPN (Maoist)	4 May 2011	29 August 2011
Minister for Constituent Assembly, Federal Affairs, Parliamentary System and Culture	Khagendra Prasad Prasai	UCPN (Maoist)	4 May 2011	29 August 2011
Minister for Labour and Transportation Management	Mohammad Ishtiyaq Rayi	MJF-N	4 May 2011	29 August 2011
Minister for Agriculture and Cooperatives	Hari Narayan Yadav	MJF-N	4 May 2011	29 August 2011
Minister for Commerce and Supply	Bijay Kumar Yadav	MJF-N	1 August 2011	29 August 2011
Ministers of State
Minister of State for Education	Radha Gyawali	CPN (UML)	11 April 2011	19 April 2011
Minister of State for Local Development	Satrudhan Mahato	CPN (UML)	11 April 2011	29 August 2011
Minister of State for Irrigation	Dal Bahadur Sunar	CPN (UML)	11 April 2011	29 August 2011
Minister of State for Energy	Ramji Sharma	CPN (UML)	11 April 2011	29 August 2011
Minister of State for General Administration	Dambar Sambahamphe	CPN (UML)	11 April 2011	29 August 2011
Minister of State for Forests and Soil Conservation	Bhagwati Chaudhary	CPN (UML)	11 April 2011	29 August 2011
Minister of State for Finance	Lharkyal Lama	CPN (UML)	11 April 2011	19 April 2011
Minister of State for Land Reform and Management	Haqikullah Khan	UCPN (Maoist)	4 May 2011	1 August 2011
Minister of State for Physical Planning and Works	Devi Khadka	UCPN (Maoist)	4 May 2011	29 August 2011
Minister of State for Health and Population	Dharmashila Chapagain	UCPN (Maoist)	4 May 2011	29 August 2011
Minister of State for Tourism and Civil Aviation	Dhruba Aangdembe Limbu	UCPN (Maoist)	4 May 2011	1 August 2011
Minister of State for Agriculture and Cooperatives	Nanda Kumar Dutt	MJF-N	4 May 2011	1 August 2011
