= First Bista cabinet =

Government of Nepal from 1969 to 1970

- Cabinet of Nepal
- April 1969–April 1970
- Date formed: 7 April 1969
- Date dissolved: 13 April 1970

People and organisations
- Monarch: King Mahendra
- Prime Minister: Kirti Nidhi Bista
- Total no. of members: 16 appointments

History
- Predecessor: Thapa cabinet, 1965
- Successor: Rajbhandari interim cabinet

Kirti Nidhi Bista formed a government on 1 April 1969 after being appointed as prime minister by King Mahendra Bir Bikram Shah.

== Cabinet ==
Portfolio	Minister	Took office	Left office
Ministers
Prime Minister; Minister of Finance; Minister of General Administration; Minister of Royal Palace Affair	Kirti Nidhi Bista	7 April 1969	13 April 1970
Minister of Foreign Affairs; Minister of Health; Minister of Information and Broadcasting	Gehendra Bahadur Rajbhandari	7 April 1969	13 April 1970
Minister of Defence; Minister of Forest and Environment	Giri Prasad Budhathoki	7 April 1969	13 April 1970
Minister of Home and Panchayat; Minister of Land Reform; Minister of Agricultural and Food	Khadka Bahadur Singh	7 April 1969	13 April 1970
Minister of Communication and Transport; Minister of Water and Power	Rudra Prasad Giri	7 April 1969	13 April 1970
Minister of Industry and Commerce	Nava Raj Subedi	7 April 1969	13 April 1970
Minister of Education; Minister of Law, Justice and Parliamentary Affair	Vasudev Prasad Dhungana	7 April 1969	13 April 1970
State Ministers
Minister of State for Health; Minister of State for Information and Broadcasting	Gunjeshwari Prasad Singh	7 April 1969	13 April 1970
Minister of State for Communication and Transport	Hom Bahadur Shrestha	7 April 1969	13 April 1970
Minister of State for General Administration	Vindeshwar Prasad Singh	7 April 1969	13 April 1970
Minister of State for Land Reform; Minister of State for Agriculture and Food	Vasudev Prasad Dhungana	7 April 1969	13 April 1970
Assistant Ministers
Assistant Minister for Land Reform	Khadga Bahadur Gurung	7 April 1969	13 April 1970
Assistant Minister for Land Reform	Bhakti Man Dewan	7 April 1969	13 April 1970
Assistant Minister for Agriculture and Food	Harish Chandra Mahat	7 April 1969	13 April 1970
Assistant Minister for Home and Panchayat	Delhi Sher Rai	7 April 1969	13 April 1970
Assistant Minister for Law and Justice	Deepak Bahadur Khadka	7 April 1969	13 April 1970
