= Ram Sharan Mahat =

Nepali politician

Ram Saran Mahat, Phd
- रामशरण महत
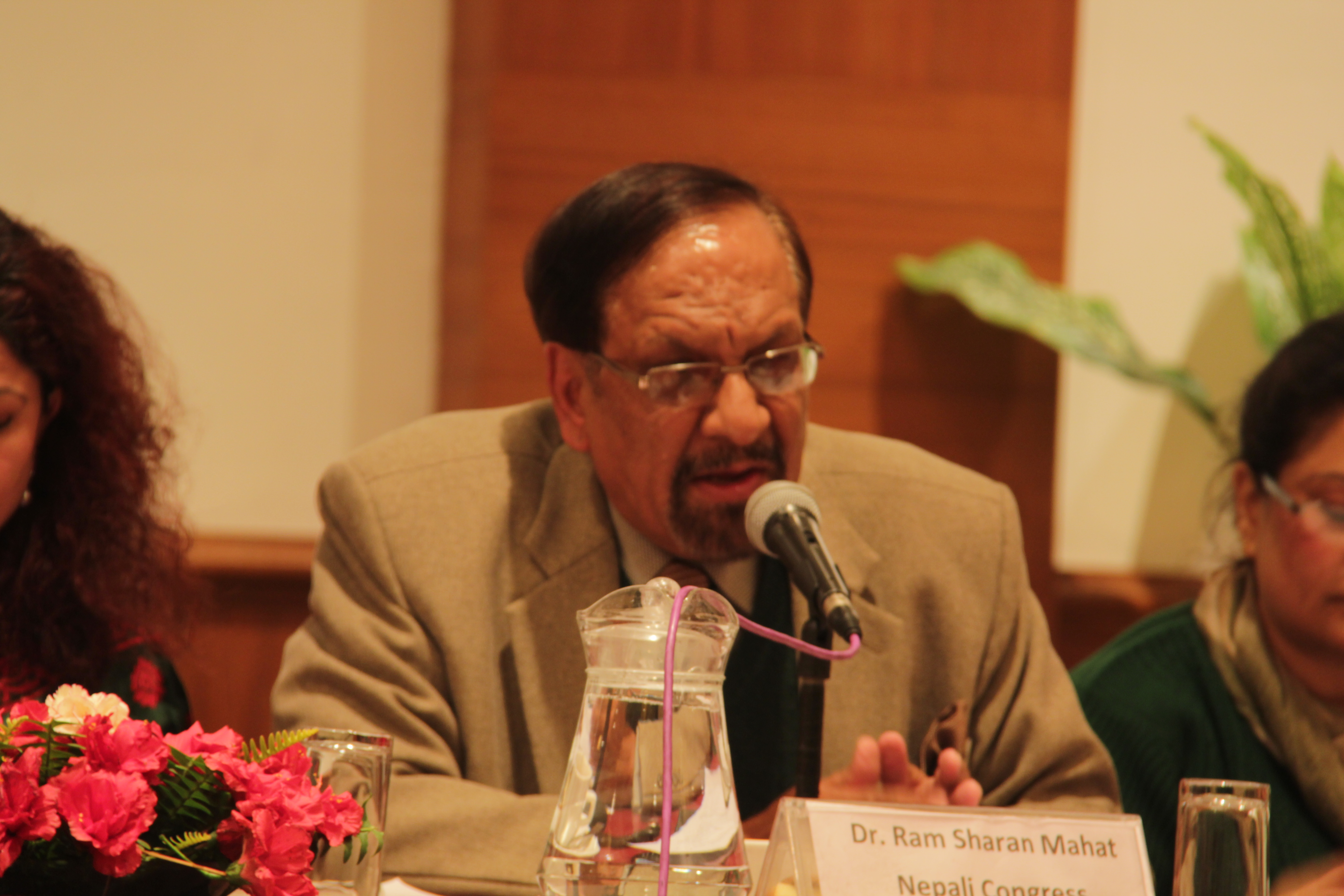
- Mahat speaking in a program on women's participation

Minister of Finance
- In office 25 February 2014 – 12 October 2015
- President: Ram Baran Yadav
- Prime Minister: Sushil Koirala
- Vice President: Paramananda Jha
- Preceded by: Shankar Prasad Koirala
- Succeeded by: Bishnu Prasad Paudel
- In office 17 October 1996 – 10 March 1997
- Monarch: King Birendra
- Prime Minister: Sher Bahadur Deuba
- Succeeded by: Rabindra Nath Sharma
- In office 22 September 1995 – 31 July 1996
- Monarch: King Birendra
- Prime Minister: Sher Bahadur Deuba
- Preceded by: Bharat Mohan Adhikari

Minister of Foreign Affairs
- In office 30 June 1999 – 20 March 2000
- Monarch: King Birendra
- Prime Minister: Krishna Prasad Bhattarai
- Preceded by: Krishna Prasad Bhattarai (as prime minister)
- Succeeded by: Chakra Prasad Bastola

Vice-Chairman of National Planning Commission of Nepal
- In office 1991–1993
- Prime Minister: Girija Prasad Koirala
- Preceded by: Bharat Prasad Dhital
- Succeeded by: Mangal Siddhi Manandhar

Personal details
- Born: 1 January 1951 (age 75) Kabilas - 8, Nuwakot, Nepal
- Party: Nepali Congress
- Spouse: Roshana Mahat
- Relations: Prakash Sharan Mahat (brother)
- Children: Raxak Mahat and Agya Mahat
- Parents: Khadga Bahadur Mahat (father); Tol Kumari Mahat (mother)
- Education: Tribhuvan University (MEc); Gokhale Institute of Politics and Economics (PhD in Economics, 1979)
- Awards: Best Finance Minister, Francis Humbert Humphrey Award for Leadership Role in the Public Service; Tribhuvan University Gold Medal (1972; Master of Economics)

Ram Sharan Mahat (Note: Nepali: रामशरण महत) (born 1 January 1951) is a Nepali politician, economist and author affiliated with the Nepali Congress. He has served multiple terms as Nepal's Minister of Finance, including from 2014 to 2015 under Prime Minister Sushil Koirala, and also served as Minister of Foreign Affairs from 1999 to 2000.

He has represented Nuwakot in the Parliament of Nepal and was a member of both the First and Second Constituent Assemblies. Before entering electoral politics, Mahat worked with the United Nations Development Programme (UNDP) in Nepal and abroad.

== Early life and education ==
Mahat was born on 1 January 1951 in Kalibas, Nuwakot District, Nepal, to Khadga Bahadur Mahat and Tol Kumari Mahat. He completed his School Leaving Certificate in 1964 and earned a master's degree in economics from Tribhuvan University in 1972, receiving a university gold medal.

During the Panchayat period, he was detained without trial under the Security Act from 1973 to 1975 because of his political activities. Following his release, he studied at the Gokhale Institute of Politics and Economics in Pune, India, under a Government of India scholarship, where he completed a PhD in economics in 1979.

Mahat was awarded the Hubert H. Humphrey Fellowship in 1987–88 and was associated with American University in Washington, D.C.

== Career ==
=== United Nations career ===
After completing his doctoral studies, Mahat joined the United Nations Development Programme (UNDP) in 1980. He served in Nepal, New York and Pakistan. His final UNDP assignment involved coordinating a cross-border humanitarian programme for Afghanistan between 1989 and 1990. Following the restoration of multiparty democracy in Nepal in 1990, he left the organization to enter electoral politics.

=== Political career ===
Mahat became active in student politics while studying at Tribhuvan University and served as General Secretary of the Nepal Student Union. During the Panchayat era he was imprisoned on several occasions because of his political activities.

Following the restoration of multiparty democracy in 1990, he served as Economic Adviser to the Prime Minister and later as Vice-Chairman of the National Planning Commission from 1991 to 1993. During his tenure, the Commission formulated the Eighth Five-Year Plan (1992–1997), which shifted Nepal's development strategy toward market-oriented reforms, with emphasis on economic growth, poverty reduction, agriculture, infrastructure, and human development. The plan was implemented amid political instability and contributed to a period of moderate economic growth alongside liberalization measures such as tariff reforms and privatization.

He was first elected to the House of Representatives from Nuwakot 2 in the 1994 general election and subsequently represented the constituency for multiple terms. He later became a member of both the First and Second Nepalese Constituent Assemblies and was re-elected from Nuwakot–2 in the 2013 Constituent Assembly election.

Mahat served as Minister of Finance on several occasions and was Minister of Foreign Affairs from 1999 to 2000. Following the 2006 People's Movement, he became Finance Minister in the coalition government formed after the restoration of democracy. From 2014 to 2015, he again served as Minister of Finance under Prime Minister Sushil Koirala.

He also served on the Special Committee for the Integration and Rehabilitation of Maoist Army Combatants during Nepal's post-conflict peace process.

From 1993 to 1995, Mahat served on the Board of Trustees of the Asian Institute of Technology in Thailand.

== Personal life ==
Mahat is married to Roshana Mahat and has two children. His younger brother, Prakash Sharan Mahat, is also a Nepali Congress politician.

== Publications ==
Mahat is the author of In Defence of Democracy: Dynamics and Fault Lines of Nepal's Political Economy (2005) and Trials, Tremors and Hope (2019).
