= Minister of Foreign Affairs (Nepal) =

Head of the Ministry of Foreign Affairs of Nepal

- परराष्ट्र मन्त्री
- Emblem of Nepal

- Flag of Nepal

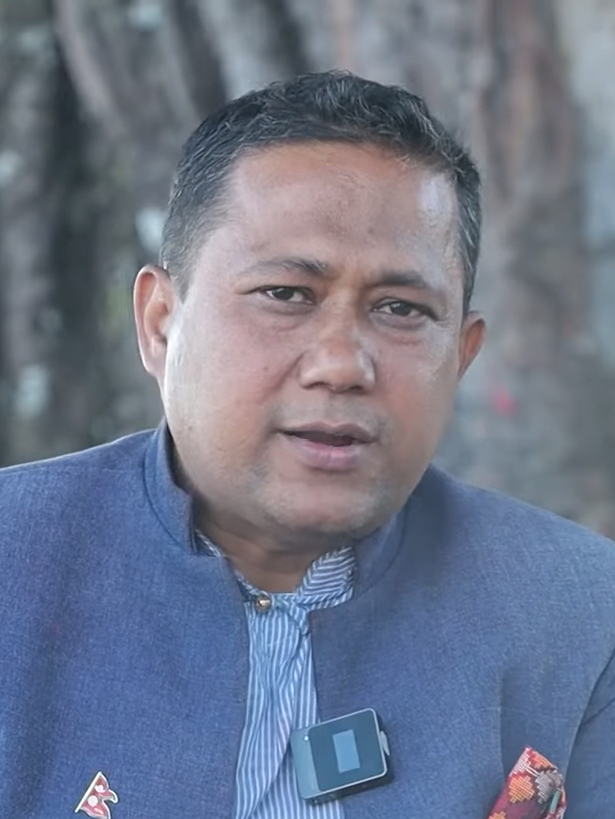
- Incumbent; Shishir Khanal since 27 March 2026
- Ministry of Foreign Affairs
- Style: Honourable
- Member of: Council of Ministers
- Reports to: Prime Minister, Parliament
- Seat: Kathmandu, Nepal
- Nominator: Prime Minister
- Appointer: President
- Term length: No fixed term
- Formation: 1948; 78 years ago
- First holder: Mohan Shumsher Jung Bahadur Rana

The minister of foreign affairs (Nepali: परराष्ट्र मन्त्री, romanized: Pararāṣṭra Mantrī, or simply, the foreign minister) is the head of the Ministry of Foreign Affairs of the Government of Nepal. One of the senior-most offices in the federal cabinet, the chief responsibility of the foreign minister is to represent Nepal and its government in the international community. The Foreign Minister also plays an important role in determining and implementing Nepalese foreign policy.

The current foreign minister is Shishir Khanal, who assumed office on 27 March 2026 under Prime Mninister Balendra Shah

== List of ministers ==
This is a list of ministers of foreign affairs of Nepal.

No.	Name (Birth–Death)	Portrait	Term of office
Kingdom of Nepal
—	Sovag Jung Thapa (1910–2004) Acting		1948
1	Mohan Shumsher Jung Bahadur Rana (1885–1967) As Prime Minister		1948–1951
2	Matrika Prasad Koirala (1912–1997) As Prime Minister		1951–1952
3	Khadga Man Singh (1907–1994)		1952–1953
(2)	Matrika Prasad Koirala (1912–1997) As Prime Minister		1953–1954
4	Dilli Raman Regmi (1913–2001)		1954–1955
5	Sovag Jung Thapa (1910–2004)		1955–1956
6	Chuda Prasad Sharma (1916–1989)		1956–1957
7	Kunwar Inderjit Singh (1906–1982) As Prime Minister		1957
8	Purendra Bikram Shah (1900–1976)		1958–1959
9	Bishweshwar Prasad Koirala (1914–1982) As Prime Minister		1959–1960
10	Tulsi Giri (1926–2018)		1960–1962
11	Rishikesh Shah (1925–2002)		1962
(10)	Tulsi Giri (1926–2018)		1962–1963
12	Kirti Nidhi Bista (1927–2017)		1963–1968
13	Gehendra Bahadur Rajbhandari (1923–1994)		1968–1971
(12)	Kirti Nidhi Bista (1927–2017) As Prime Minister		1971–1972
14	Gyanendra Bahadur Karki (1930–1992)		1972–1975
15	Krishna Raj Aryal (b. 1928)		1975–1979
(12)	Kirti Nidhi Bista (1927–2017) As Prime Minister		1979
16	K. B. Shahi (b. 1929)		1979–1981
17	Surya Bahadur Thapa (1928–2015) As Prime Minister		1981–1982
18	Padma Bahadur Khatri (1915–1985)		1982–1985
19	Ranadhir Subba (1909–1992)		1985–1986
20	Shailendra Kumar Upadhyay (1929–2011)		1986–1990
21	Hari Bahadur Basnet (b. 1942)		1990
22	Pashupati Shamsher Jang Bahadur Rana (b. 1941)		1990
23	Krishna Prasad Bhattarai (1924–2011) As Prime Minister		1990–1991
24	Girija Prasad Koirala (1924–2010) As Prime Minister		1991–1994
25	Madhav Kumar Nepal (b. 1953)		1994–1995
26	Prakash Chandra Lohani (b. 1944)		1995–1997
27	Rabindra Nath Sharma (1930?–2008)		1997
(26)	Prakash Chandra Lohani (b. 1944)		1997
28	Kamal Thapa (b. 1955)		1997–1998
(24)	Girija Prasad Koirala (1924–2010) As Prime Minister		1998–1999
(23)	Krishna Prasad Bhattarai (1924–2011) As Prime Minister		1999
29	Ram Sharan Mahat (b. 1951)		1999–2000
30	Chakra Bastola (1946–2018)		2000–2001
31	Sher Bahadur Deuba (b. 1946) As Prime Minister		2001–2002
32	Narendra Bikram Shah (b. 1940)		2002–2003
(17)	Surya Bahadur Thapa (1928–2015) As Prime Minister		2003–2004
33	Bhesh Bahadur Thapa (b. 1937)		2004
(31)	Sher Bahadur Deuba (b. 1946) As Prime Minister		2004–2005
34	Ramesh Nath Pandey (b. 1944)		2005–2006
35	KP Sharma Oli (b. 1952)		2006–2007
36	Sahana Pradhan (1927–2014)		2007–2008
Federal Democratic Republic of Nepal
37	Upendra Yadav (b. 1960)		2008–2009
38	Sujata Koirala (b. 1954)		2009–2011
(37)	Upendra Yadav (b. 1960)		2011
39	Narayan Kaji Shrestha (b. 1960)		2011–2012
40	Ishwar Pokhrel (b. 1954)		2012
(39)	Narayan Kaji Shrestha (b. 1960)		2012–2013
41	Madhav Prasad Ghimire (1961–2016)		2013–2014
42	Mahendra Bahadur Pandey (b. 1948)		2014–2015
(28)	Kamal Thapa (b. 1955)		2015–2016
43	Prakash Sharan Mahat (b. 1959)		2016–2017
44	Krishna Bahadur Mahara (b. 1958)		2017
(31)	Sher Bahadur Deuba (b. 1946) As Prime Minister		2017–2018
45	Pradeep Kumar Gyawali (b. 1962)		2018–2021
46	Raghubir Mahaseth (b. 1961)		2021
(35)	KP Sharma Oli (b. 1952) As Prime Minister		2021
(31)	Sher Bahadur Deuba (b. 1946) As Prime Minister		2021
47	Narayan Khadka (b. 1949)		2021–2022
48	Bimala Rai Paudyal (b. 1966)		2023
49	Pushpa Kamal Dahal (b. 1954) As Prime Minister		2023–2023
50	Narayan Prakash Saud (b. 1962)		2023–2024
(39)	Narayan Kaji Shrestha (b. 1960)		2024
51	Arzu Rana Deuba (b. 1962)		2024–2025
52	Sushila Karki (b. 1952) As Interim Prime Minister		2025–2025
53	Bala Nanda Sharma		2025–2026
54	Shishir Khanal (b. 1978)		2026–present
