= Prakash Sharan Mahat =

Nepali politician and economist

- प्रकाश शरण महत
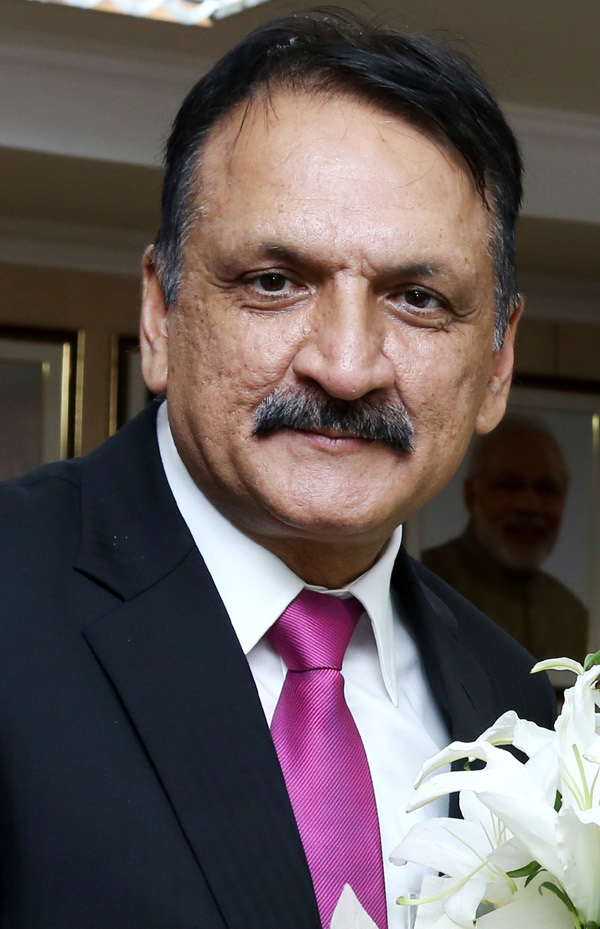

Minister of Finance
- In office 31 March 2023 – 4 March 2024
- President: Ram Chandra Poudel
- Prime Minister: Pushpa Kamal Dahal
- Preceded by: Bishnu Prasad Paudel

Minister of Foreign Affairs
- In office 4 August 2016 – 31 May 2017
- President: Bidya Devi Bhandari
- Prime Minister: Pushpa Kamal Dahal
- Preceded by: Kamal Thapa
- Succeeded by: Krishna Bahadur Mahara

Minister of Energy
- In office 17 June 2009 – 6 February 2011
- President: Ram Baran Yadav
- Prime Minister: Madhav Kumar Nepal
- Succeeded by: Bharat Mohan Adhikari

Member of the House of Representatives
- In office 14 December 2022 – 12 September 2025
- PR group: Khas Arya
- Constituency: Nepali Congress PR list

Member of the Legislature Parliament
- In office 21 January 2014 – 14 October 2017
- PR group: Khas Arya
- Constituency: Nepali Congress PR list

Member of the Constituent Assembly of Nepal
- In office 28 May 2008 – 28 May 2012
- PR group: Khas Arya
- Constituency: Nepali Congress PR list

Member of the Reinstated House of Representatives
- In office 13 January 2007 – 6 January 2008
- Prime Minister: Girija Prasad Koirala
- Constituency: Nominated (Nepali Congress (Democratic) Party List)

Minister of State for Foreign Affairs
- In office 5 July 2004 – 1 February 2005
- Monarch: King Gyanendra
- Prime Minister: Sher Bahadur Deuba

Personal details
- Born: 5 November 1959 (age 66) Kalibas Village, Nuwakot, Nepal
- Party: Nepali Congress (before 2002; 2007–present)
- Other political affiliations: Nepali Congress (Democratic) (2002–2007)
- Spouse: Bina Mahat
- Children: 2
- Parents: Khadga Bahadur Mahat (father); Tol Kumari Mahat (mother)
- Relatives: Ram Sharan Mahat (brother)
- Education: Tribhuvan University (MEc); University of Wisconsin–Madison (MSc in Policy Economics); Southern Illinois University Carbondale (PhD in Economics, 1997)
- Occupation: Politician, Economist
- Known for: Economic policy, fiscal management, foreign policy, energy development

Prakash Sharan Mahat is a Nepali politician and economist. He is a senior leader and spokesperson of the Nepali Congress. He has served as Minister of Finance, Minister of Foreign Affairs, and Minister of Energy of Nepal.

== Career ==
Mahat has been active in Nepali politics since his student years. During the Panchayat era he participated in pro democracy student movements. He later joined the Nepali Congress and became involved in party organisation and policy work.

Mahat was a member of the Interim Legislative Parliament from 2006 to 2008. He was subsequently elected to the 1st Nepalese Constituent Assembly and the 2nd Nepalese Constituent Assembly through the proportional representation list of the Nepali Congress. He is currently a member of the House of Representatives under the proportional representation system.

=== Ministerial career ===
Mahat served as Minister of Energy from 2010 to 2011. Contemporary reporting during his tenure discusses the 456 MW Upper Tamakoshi Hydropower Project in the context of government energy policy and load shedding reduction plans. The Nepal Electricity Authority annual report for fiscal year 2009 to 2010 lists him as Minister for Energy and Chair of the Authority in its introductory pages.

As Minister of Foreign Affairs, Mahat led Nepal's delegation to the 71st session of the United Nations General Assembly and delivered Nepal's statement in New York in September 2016.

Mahat was appointed Minister of Finance on 31 March 2023. Reporting at the time described the appointment as occurring amid financial strain and low private sector confidence, and noted that he formed a task force to manage government cash flow.

In the budget speech for fiscal year 2080/81, the Ministry of Finance published the official budget statement delivered by Mahat in May 2023. The statement sets out budget size and spending priorities for that fiscal year.

Mahat left office on 4 March 2024 amid a change in coalition arrangements, with Reuters reporting that Prime Minister Pushpa Kamal Dahal intended to remove several ministers including Mahat. The Kathmandu Post also reported on Dahal's preparations for a cabinet reshuffle that included the finance portfolio in early March 2024.

Mahat has been associated with academic and policy discussions on economic development, governance, and Nepal's peace process. He has also spoken publicly about economic conditions during his tenure as finance minister.

== Personal life ==
Mahat is married to Bina Mahat, and they have two children.
