= Prosperous Nepal, Happy Nepali =

Prosperous Nepal, Happy Nepali (Nepali: समृद्ध नेपाल, सुखी नेपाली; "Samriddha Nepal, Sukhi Nepali") is the motto put forward by Nepali Prime minister KP Sharma Oli in his second premiership. The National Planning Commission has published 55 index for meeting the motto until financial year 2080-81.

The objectives of the motto includes:

- High and equitable national income
- Human capital formation and full utilization of potential
- Accessible and modern infrastructure and intensive interconnection
- High and sustainable production and productivity
- Sophisticated and dignified life
- Civilized and just society
- Healthy and balanced ecosystem
- Good governance
- Rule of law
