= Yadav Pant =

Nepali politician

Yadav Prasad Pant
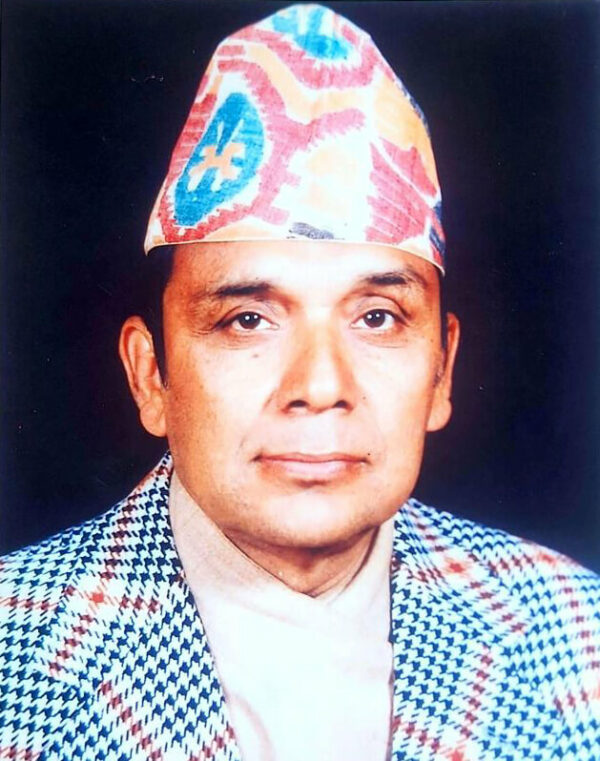

Fifth Governor of Nepal Rastra Bank
- In office 24 April 1968 – 28 April 1973
- Preceded by: Dr. Bhekh Bahadur Thapa
- Succeeded by: Kulashekhar Sharma

Minister of Finance of Nepal
- In office June 1980 – July 1983
- Preceded by: Surya Bahadur Thapa
- Succeeded by: Prakash Chandra Lohani

Minister for Commerce, Supplies and Water Resources

Ambassador of Nepal to Japan
- In office 1975–1979

Personal details
- Born: November 17, 1925
- Died: November 14, 2007 (aged 81) Bumrungrad International, Thailand
- Spouse: Rama Pandey
- Children: Mira Arjyal; Girish Pant; Bhubanesh Pant; Radhesh Pant
- Education: Banaras Hindu University (BHU), India
- Occupation: Economist and Politician

Yadav Prasad Pant (Note: Nepali: यादवप्रसाद पन्त) (17 November 1925 – 14 November 2007) was a Nepalese economist and politician. During his career he held several high level positions including senior economist at the United Nations Economic and Social Commission for Asia and the Pacific in Bangkok, Thailand; Governor of the Nepal Rastra Bank (1968–1973); Ambassador to Japan (1975–1979); and Minister for Commerce, Supplies, Finance (1980–1983) and Water Resources (1986–1988). He died at the age of 82 in Bumrungrad Hospital in Thailand.

Panta introduced the Nepalese economy to the world by his writings.

== Early life and education ==
Dr. Pant was born in Kathmandu, Nepal, as the only child of Bishnu Prasad Pant and Bhisma Kumari Pant. After the passing of his mother when he was six years old, he spent much of his childhood in Banaras, India. At the age of 18, he married Rama Pandey, daughter of Sardar Rudra Raj Pandey and Chet Kumari Pandey, on 11 June 1943.

He earned his B.A. from Patna University in 1946 and completed his M.A. in Economics from Banaras Hindu University (BHU) in 1948. He received his Ph.D. in Economics from BHU in 1954, becoming the first Ph.D. holder in Nepal. In 1976, BHU awarded him a D.Litt for his book Problems of Fiscal and Monetary Policy: A Case Study of Nepal.

== Academic and Professional Career ==
Between 1953 and 1957, Dr. Pant served as Professor of Economics at Tri-Chandra College, teaching Development Economics and History of the Indian Economy. His extensive service to Nepal's economic governance includes roles as:

- Member, First Planning Commission (1954–56)
- Chief Economic Advisor (1956–61)
- Secretary, Ministry of Finance and Economic Affairs (1961–66)
- Governor, Nepal Rastra Bank (1968–73)
- Founding Chairman, Bank of Kathmandu (1994–98)

He also chaired several state-owned enterprises, including Nepal Airlines Corporation, Nepal Oil Corporation, and National Commercial Bank.

== International Engagements ==
Dr. Pant was the first Nepali to serve in the United Nations system, as an economist at UN ECAFE (now ESCAP) between 1957–59. He represented Nepal at numerous global platforms, including:

- Governor, International Monetary Fund (1968–73)
- Governor, World Bank (1980–83)
- Ambassador to Japan, Australia, New Zealand, Philippines, and South Korea (1974–79)
- Chair, Board of Governors, Asian Development Bank (1982–83)

He played a central role in the establishment of ADB and represented Nepal in several high-level summits, conferences, and bilateral commissions. He frequently delivered keynote addresses and participated in economic forums across Europe, Asia, and North America.

== Political career ==
Dr. Pant served as:

- Minister of State for Finance and General Administration (1980–83)
- Minister of Finance, Commerce and Supplies (1980–83)
- Minister of Water Resources (1986–88)

He was nominated to the Rastriya Panchayat in 1980 and later elected from Nawalparasi in 1986. He was a founder member and Vice President (1990–93) of the Rastriya Prajatantra Party and played an active role in its international affiliations.

== Cultural and Social Contributions ==
Dr. Pant was deeply involved in Nepal’s cultural and social institutions. His roles included:

- Life Member and First Vice-President, Nepal Red Cross Society
- President, United Nations Association of Nepal (1979–96)* Founder-President, Nepal-Japan Friendship and Cultural Association
- Vice-Governor, Lions Clubs International, District 325 B
- Chairman, Nepal-Scandinavian Chamber of Commerce and Industry

He contributed to numerous organizations promoting international development, economic studies, and intercultural relations.

== Honors and Decorations ==
Dr. Pant received many national and international honors:

- KCVO from Queen Elizabeth II (1961)
- Gorkha Dakshin Bahu, First Class (1963)
- Mahendra Vidya Bhusan (1963, 1977)
- Tri-Shakti Patta, First Class (1964)
- Janapad Sewa Padak (1967)* Order of the Rising Sun, First Class from Emperor Hirohito (1978)
- Order of Diplomatic Service Merit, Gwangha Medal from President Park Chung Hee of Korea (1979)

== Publications ==
Dr. Pant authored over 20 books and more than 300 articles on economics, planning, trade, and development. His notable works include:

- Planning for Prosperity in Nepal (1957)
- Economic Development of Nepal (1965)
- Problems in Fiscal and Monetary Policy: A Case Study of Nepal (1970)
- Population Growth and Employment Opportunities in Nepal (1983)* Trade and Co-operation in South Asia (1991)

Many of his publications were used as reference texts in policymaking and academic institutions.

== Death ==
Dr. Yadav Prasad Pant died on 14 November 2007 while undergoing treatment at Bumrungrad Hospital in Bangkok. He was cremated at Arya Ghat, Pashupatinath Temple, Kathmandu, the following day.
