= Barsaman Pun =

Nepali politician

- वर्षमान पुन

Minister of Finance of Nepal
- In office 6 March 2024 – 15 July 2024
- President: Ram Chandra Poudel
- Prime Minister: Pushpa Kamal Dahal
- Preceded by: Prakash Sharan Mahat
- Succeeded by: Bishnu Prasad Paudel
- In office August 2011 – March 2013
- President: Ram Baran Yadav
- Prime Minister: Baburam Bhattarai
- Preceded by: Bharat Mohan Adhikari
- Succeeded by: Shankar Prasad Koirala

Minister of Energy, Water Resources and Irrigation of Nepal
- In office 16 March 2018 – 25 December 2022
- President: Bidhya Devi Bhandari
- Prime Minister: KP Sharma Oli
- Preceded by: Mahendra Bahadur Shahi
- Succeeded by: Top Bahadur Rayamajhi

Minister of Peace and Reconstruction of Nepal
- In office 14 February 2011 – April 2011
- President: Ram Baran Yadav
- Prime Minister: Jhalanath Khanal
- Preceded by: Rakam Chemjong
- Succeeded by: Bishwonath Shah

Member of Parliament, Pratinidhi Sabha
- Incumbent
- Assumed office 4 March 2018
- Preceded by: Krishna Bahadur Mahara
- Constituency: Rolpa 1

Member of Constituent Assembly
- In office 28 May 2008 – 28 May 2012
- Preceded by: Sushila Nepal
- Succeeded by: Udaya Shumsher Rana
- Constituency: Lalitpur 1

Personal details
- Born: 1 June 1971 (age 55) Jangkot, Rolpa
- Party: CPN (Maoist Centre)
- Spouse: Onsari Gharti Magar

Barsaman Pun, (Note: Also transliterated as Barsha Man Pun or Barshaman Pun.) also known by his nom de guerre Ananta, is a Nepali communist politician and former Minister for Energy, Water Resources and Irrigation.

Pun has previously served as Minister of Finance and Minister of Peace and Reconstruction. He was a leader of the Communist Party of Nepal (Maoist-Centre) during the insurgency period and served as one of the 4 deputy commanders of the Nepali People's Liberation Army.

== Insurgency ==
He commanded the attack on Holeri police station on February 13, 1996 which marked the beginning of the civil war. He was appointed as the PLA Eastern Division commander following the 2002 central committee meeting. Some of the battles he commanded in this capacity include the attack at Bhiman, Sindhuli in September 2002 which led to the death of 49 policemen and the attack on Bandipur barracks in May 2005. He was appointed as a deputy commander of People's Liberation Army at the Chunbang conference in 2005.

== Political career ==
Following the Second People's Movement and Comprehensive Peace Accord, Pun transitioned into politics. He was elected to the first Constituent Assembly from Lalitpur-1. He contested the second Constituent Assembly from Morang in line with the party policy of top Maoist leaders contesting the election from the Terai belt. However, he came in third place behind then Congress District Chairman Dig Bahadur Limbu and CPN-UML candidate Ghanashyam Khatiwada. He contested the 2017 House of Representatives election from his home district, Rolpa and was elected to parliament.

== MCC Compact ==
MCC began developing the compact at the request of Nepal in 2012 when Baburam Bhattarai was prime minister and Barsaman Pun was finance minister of Nepal.

The compact was taken to parliament for ratification on 15 July 2019 when KP Sharma Oli was prime minister and Barsaman Pun the energy minister.

== Electoral history ==
Election	House	Constituency	Party	Votes	Position	Opponent	Party	Votes	Result
2008	Constituent Assembly	Lalitpur 1	Maoist Centre	15,329	1st	Udaya Shumsher Rana	Nepali Congress	14,011	Elected
2013	Constituent Assembly	Morang 9	Maoist Centre	8,525	3rd	Dig Bahadur Limbu	Nepali Congress	15,202	Defeated
2017	House of Representatives	Rolpa 1	Maoist Centre	42,084	1st	Amar Singh Pun	Nepali Congress	20,337	Elected
2022	House of Representatives	Rolpa 1	Maoist Centre	41,714	1st	Purna Budha Magar	CPN (UML)	16,485	Elected

== Personal life ==
He is married to Onsari Gharti Magar, a fellow communist politician and former speaker of the Parliament of Nepal.
