= Bhesh Bahadur Thapa =

Former Governor of Nepal Rastra Bank

Dr. Bhekh Bahadur Thapa

Minister of Foreign Affairs
- In office 5 March 2004 – 5 July 2005
- Monarch: Gyanendra of Nepal
- Prime Minister: Surya Bahadur Thapa
- Preceded by: Surya Bahadur Thapa
- Succeeded by: Dr. Prakash Sharan Mahat

Nepalese Ambassador to India
- In office 1997–2003
- Monarch: Birendra of Nepal

Nepalese Ambassador to USA
- In office 1996–1997
- Monarch: Birendra of Nepal
- In office 1980–1985
- Monarch: Birendra of Nepal

Minister of Finance of Nepal
- In office 1976–1978
- Monarch: Birendra of Nepal
- Preceded by: Kirti Nidhi Bista
- Succeeded by: Ram Prasad Rajbahak

Fourth Governor of Nepal Rastra Bank
- In office 14 August 1966 – 26 July 1967
- Monarch: Mahendra of Nepal
- Preceded by: Pradyumna Lal Rajbhandari
- Succeeded by: Yadav Pant

Personal details
- Born: March 4, 1937 (age 89) Tanahu district, Nepal
- Spouse: Dr. Rita Thapa
- Relations: Bhaskar Thapa (son) Manjushree Thapa (daughter) Tejshree Thapa (daughter) Maya Thapa (granddaughter) Barun Thapa (grandson) Rita Thapa (wife)
- Education: Claremont University

Bhesh Bahadur Thapa (Note: Nepali: भेखबहादुर थापा) also spelled as Bhekh Bahadur Thapa is a Nepalese foreign affairs expert and diplomat. He is former Minister of Foreign Affairs of Nepal. He was fourth Governor of Nepal Rastra Bank from 14 August 1966 to 26 July 1967. He was Minister of Finance between 1976 and 1978 A.D after serving as State Minister of Finance and Secretary of Finance Ministry. He has twice served as Ambassador to USA (1980–1985 & 1996). He has served as former Nepalese ambassador to India from 1997 to 2003. He also headed the National Advisory Committee for 18th SAARC summit that was held at Kathmandu in November 2014. Currently, he is working as EPG (Eminent Person's Group) coordinator representing Nepal on reviewing bilateral treaties between India and Nepal.

== Personal life ==
He is married to Dr. Rita Thapa, a public health specialist. He has a son and two daughters. His son Bhaskar Thapa a tunnel engineer was a lead designer of the Caldecott Tunnel Fourth Bore. His elder daughter Tejshree Thapa, a human rights lawyer, lived in the Netherlands before dying at the age of 52 in March 2019. He has two grandsons Barun and Siddhant, through daughter-in-law Sumira Thapa, as well as a granddaughter, aged 19, through Tejshree. His youngest daughter Manjushree Thapa is an English language author.

== Controversies ==
In 2024, Nepali journalism outlets reported allegations that portions of public riverbank land at Baneshwor Height (Dhobikhola corridor, Kathmandu) were irregularly incorporated into plots associated with Thapa's residence, commonly referred to as "Bheri Bas Bangla." The reports cite registration activity from the late 2050s BS (late 1990s) and claim that some supporting transfer records are missing from the Land Revenue Office. Thapa publicly denied any encroachment and said he would accept verification by the Survey and Land Revenue offices, stating that he had "not taken even an inch" of government land. The Ward 10 chair is quoted in contemporaneous reporting as saying that Thapa has lived at the site for more than 50 years and his home does not fall on government land. As of 2026, no court decision canceling his title has been reported in reliable sources, and no publicly available documentary evidence establishing improper acquisition has been presented beyond media accounts.
