= Bishnu Prasad Paudel =

Nepali politician

Bishna Prasad Paudel MP
- विष्णुप्रसाद पौडेल

Deputy Prime Minister of Nepal
- In office 15 July 2024 – 9 September 2025 Serving with Prakash Man Singh
- President: Ram Chandra Poudel
- Prime Minister: Khadga Prasad Sharma Oli
- Preceded by: Raghubir Mahaseth; Narayan Kaji Shrestha; Rabi Lamichhane; Upendra Yadav (until 13 May 2024)
- Succeeded by: Vacant
- In office 26 December 2022 – 27 February 2023 Serving with Narayan Kaji Shrestha, Rabi Lamichhane and Rajendra Prasad Lingden
- President: Bidhya Devi Bhandari
- Prime Minister: Pushpa Kamal Dahal
- Preceded by: himself Rajendra Mahato; Raghubir Mahaseth
- Succeeded by: Purna Bahadur Khadka
- In office 4 June 2021 – 22 June 2021 Serving with Rajendra Mahato and Raghubir Mahaseth
- President: Bidya Devi Bhandari
- Prime Minister: Khadga Prasad Sharma Oli
- Preceded by: Ishwar Pokhrel Upendra Yadav (until 24 December 2019)
- Succeeded by: himself Rajendra Mahato; Raghubir Mahaseth

Minister of Finance of Nepal
- In office 15 July 2024 – 9 September 2025
- President: Ram Chandra Poudel
- Prime Minister: Khadga Prasad Sharma Oli
- Preceded by: Barshaman Pun
- Succeeded by: Rameshwor Prasad Khanal
- In office 26 December 2022 – 27 February 2023
- President: Bidhya Devi Bhandari
- Prime Minister: Pushpa Kamal Dahal
- Preceded by: Janardan Sharma
- Succeeded by: Prakash Sharan Mahat
- In office 14 October 2020 – 12 July 2021
- President: Bidya Devi Bhandari
- Prime Minister: Khadga Prasad Sharma Oli
- Preceded by: Dr. Yuba Raj Khatiwada
- Succeeded by: Janardan Sharma
- In office 5 November 2015 – 1 August 2016
- President: Bidya Devi Bhandari
- Prime Minister: Khadga Prasad Sharma Oli
- Preceded by: Dr. Ram Saran Mahat
- Succeeded by: Krishna Bahadur Mahara

Minister of Home Affairs of Nepal
- In office 24 June 2021 – 12 July 2021
- President: Bidya Devi Bhandari
- Prime Minister: Khadga Prasad Sharma Oli
- Preceded by: Khagaraj Adhikari
- Succeeded by: Bal Krishna Khand

Minister of Industry, Commerce and Supplies of Nepal
- In office 24 June 2021 – 12 July 2021
- President: Bidya Devi Bhandari
- Prime Minister: Khadga Prasad Sharma Oli
- Preceded by: Raj Kishor Yadav
- Succeeded by: Gajendra Bahadur Hamal

Minister of Energy, Water Resources and Irrigation of Nepal
- In office 24 June 2021 – 12 July 2021
- President: Bidya Devi Bhandari
- Prime Minister: Khadga Prasad Sharma Oli
- Preceded by: Sharat Singh Bhandari
- Succeeded by: Pampha Bhusal

Minister of Defence
- In office 6 February 2011 – 29 August 2011
- President: Ram Baran Yadav
- Prime Minister: Jhala Nath Khanal
- Preceded by: Bidya Devi Bhandari
- Succeeded by: Baburam Bhattarai

Minister for Water Resources of Nepal
- In office 18 August 2008 – 25 May 2009
- President: Ram Baran Yadav
- Prime Minister: Pushpa Kamal Dahal
- Preceded by: Chitra Lekha Yadav
- Succeeded by: Prakash Sharan Mahat
- In office October 1994 – May 1999
- Preceded by: Hari Nepal
- Constituency: Palpa 3

Member of the Constituent Assembly / Legislature Parliament
- In office 28 May 2008 – 14 October 2017
- Preceded by: Surya Prasad Pradhan (as MP)
- Constituency: Rupandehi 4

Member of Parliament, Pratinidhi Sabha
- In office 18 March 2018 – 12 September 2025
- Succeeded by: Sulabh Kharel
- Constituency: Rupandehi-2

Personal details
- Born: 20 November 1959 (age 66) Syangja, Nepal
- Party: CPN (UML) (before 2018; 2021-present)
- Other political affiliations: Nepal Communist Party (NCP) (2018-2021)
- Website: bishnuprasadpaudel.com

Bishnu Prasad Paudel (Nepali: विष्णुप्रसाद पौडेल) is a Nepalese politician, who is the vice-chairman of Communist Party of Nepal (Unified Marxist–Leninist). Paudel served as the deputy prime minister and Minister of Finance in the Third Dahal cabinet. He has earlier served as deputy prime minister (2021), and headed other prominent ministries such as Finance (2020-2021, 2015-2016), Home Affairs (2021), Industry (2021), Water (2021, 2008-2009, 1994-1999) and Defence (2011).

He was a member of the House of Representatives elected from Rupandehi district, Parliamentary Constituency 2, in the election of the Federal Parliament held in 2017. He won the election with a huge margin of 22,000 votes at that time. During the second constituent assembly election in 2013, he defeated the former prime minister Baburam Bhattarai from Rupandehi 4.

Paudel previously served as the Minister of Finance from 5 November 2015 to 1 August 2016 in the first cabinet of prime minister KP Sharma Oli. He also served as Minister of Defence from 6 February 2011 to 29 August 2011, under Prime Minister Jhala Nath Khanal and as the Minister for Water Resources from 18 August 2008 to 25 May 2009 under Prime Minister Pushpa Kamal Dahal. He also served as the Minister for Youth, Sports and Culture in 1997 under Prime Minister Lokendra Bahadur Chand.

On 9 September 2025 he and a lot of other government politicians, including prime minister KP Sharma Oli, had to resign due to the violent 2025 Nepalese Gen Z protests. A video was published on social media of Paudel being chased through the streets in Kathmandu by a mob of protesters while being repeatedly hit and kicked.

== Personal life ==
Bishnu Prasad Paudel was born to Devilal Paudel and Devaki Paudel on 20 November 1959 in Syangja, Nepal. He joined politics in 1976.

During the panchayat system in Nepal, he faced jail time.

In 1977, he passed the SLC examination and moved to Rupendehi from Syangja to start a career as a primary school teacher. He was influenced by communist activists. He resigned from teaching and joined the Communist Party at the age of 18.

Paudel broke out of the Bhairahawa Jail and went back to the people's movement. Paudel was taken to Bhairahawa jail with three thousand rupees fine in charge of state of affairs after facing the case for three years. He revolted in the jail after 45 days comprehensive preparation.

He was injured by an explosion of several hydrogen-filled balloons on 15 February 2025 during a ceremony for the Pokhara Visit Year, a tourism attraction campaign. He suffered burns and was released from hospital after two days of treatment.

== Political positions ==
- Chief, Organization Department Communist Party of Nepal (UML) since April 2021
- General secretary, Communist Party of Nepal (NCP) since 2018
- Deputy general secretary, Communist Party of Nepal (UML), 2014 - 2018
- Secretary of Central Committee, Communist Party of Nepal (UML), 2009 - 2014
- Member of Standing Committee, Communist Party of Nepal (UML), 2003 - 2019
- Member of Central Committee, Communist Party of Nepal (UML) Since 1990
- Party member of CPN (ML/UML) since 1977

== Arrest, money laundering investigation and release ==
On 22 June 2026, former Deputy Prime Minister and Finance Minister Bishnu Paudel was arrested in Surkhet by Nepal Police in connection with a money laundering investigation linked to the transfer of shares in Shree Ram Tobacco Company. Police subsequently transferred him to Kathmandu, where the Department of Money Laundering Investigation took over the investigation.

During the investigation, the Special Court granted investigators remand extensions, including an initial seven-day remand for questioning. Investigators alleged that Paudel had facilitated the transfer of Shree Ram Tobacco shares to businessman Deepak Bhatt and had benefited financially from the transaction. Paudel denied the allegations, stating before the court that he had no role in the transfer, valuation, or sale of the shares. The Department of Money Laundering Investigation filed a case seeking recovery of approximately NPR 209 million from Paudel.

On 17 July 2026, about 25 days after his arrest, a joint bench of the Special Court comprising judges Narayan Prasad Paudel, Dilliratna Shrestha and Bidur Koirala ordered Paudel's release on a regular date without requiring bail while the case proceeds. In its order, the court stated that the evidence presented at that stage did not establish Paudel's direct involvement in the disputed share transaction, nor did it demonstrate that he had received financial benefits or engaged in financial transactions with Deepak Bhatt. The court also noted that Paudel was not serving as Finance Minister when the shares were transferred and that the available evidence did not substantiate allegations that he had facilitated the transaction.

The court's order did not determine Paudel's guilt or innocence but allowed him to remain out of custody while the money laundering case continued before the Special Court.

== Electoral history ==
Paudel is a five time parliamentarian. He is one of the influential leaders of the Nepal Communist Party (UML) and had been served his third term as finance minister until Gen Z movement took place on August 8 and 9, 2025. PM KP Oli resigned on August, 9 due to the movement, in which he was a cabinet minister in Oli Government. He was elected from Palpa in the mid-term elections of 2051 and since then he has contested from Rupandehi in all five elections. He was elected four times and was defeated once in 2056. He is among the very few leaders who have been elected many times in the elections of both the party and parliament under the leadership of CPN-UML. He was an elected member in the 2nd Constituent Assembly from Rupandehi when he competed against former Prime Minister Baburam Bhattarai, who came third. He won for a fifth time from the Rupandehi 2 in 2022.

1994 Pratinidhi Sabha election Palpa-3

| Party | Candidate | Votes | Status |
|---|---|---|---|
| CPN-UML | Bishnu Prasad Paudel | 15,766 | Elected |
| Nepali Congress | Hari Prasad Nepal | 12,697 | Lost |

1999 Pratinidhi Sabha election Rupendehi-3

| Party | Candidate | Votes | Status |
|---|---|---|---|
| Nepali Congress | Surya Prasad Pradhan | 23,697 | Elected |
| CPN-UML | Bishnu Prasad Paudel | 23,033 | Lost |

2008 Constituent Assembly election Rupandehi-4

| Party | Candidate | Votes | Status |
|---|---|---|---|
| CPN-UML | Bishnu Prasad Paudel | 15,880 | Elected |
| CPN (Maoist) | Bhakti Prasad Pandey | 13,421 | Lost |

2013 Constituent Assembly election Rupandehi-4

| Party | Candidate | Votes | Status |
|---|---|---|---|
| CPN-UML | Bishnu Prasad Paudel | 19,577 | Elected |
| Nepali Congress | Surya Prasad Pradhan | 13,632 | Lost |

2017 Pratinidhi Sabha election Rupandehi-2

| Party | Candidate | Votes | Status |
|---|---|---|---|
| CPN-UML | Bishnu Prasad Paudel | 44,009 | Elected |
| Nepali Congress | Yubaraj Giri | 21,946 | Lost |

2022 Pratinidhi Sabha election Rupandehi-2

| Party | Candidate | Votes | Status |
|---|---|---|---|
| CPN-UML | Bishnu Prasad Paudel | 27,148 | Elected |
| Rastriya Swatantra Party | Ganesh Paudel | 25,781 | Lost |

2026 Pratinidhi Sabha election Rupandehi-2

| Party | Candidate | Votes | Status |
|---|---|---|---|
| CPN-UML | Bishnu Prasad Paudel | 12,861 | Lost |
| Rastriya Swatantra Party | Sulabh Kharel | 56,550 | Elected |
