= Kirti Nidhi Bista =

Former Prime Minister of Nepal

- कीर्तिनिधि विष्ट
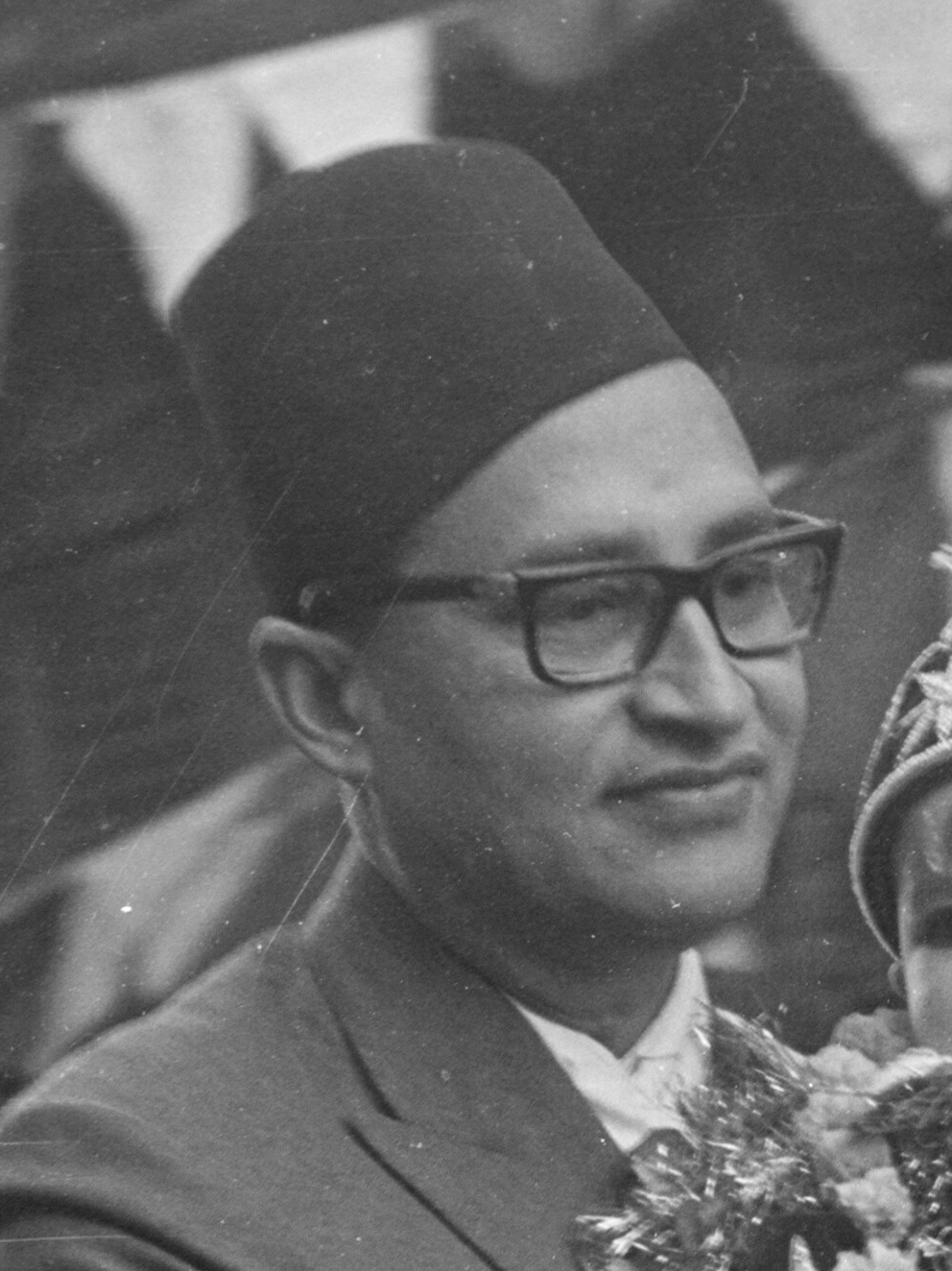
- Bista in 1972

Prime Minister of Nepal
- In office 12 September 1977 – 30 May 1979
- Monarch: Birendra
- Preceded by: Tulsi Giri
- Succeeded by: Surya Bahadur Thapa
- In office 14 April 1971 – 16 July 1973
- Monarchs: Mahendra; Birendra
- Preceded by: Gehendra Bahadur Rajbhandari (acting)
- Succeeded by: Nagendra Prasad Rijal
- In office 7 April 1969 – 13 April 1970
- Monarch: Mahendra
- Preceded by: Surya Bahadur Thapa
- Succeeded by: Gehendra Bahadur Rajbhandari (acting)

Deputy Prime Minister of Nepal
- In office 27 January 1967 – 26 September 1968
- Monarch: Mahendra
- Prime Minister: Surya Bahadur Thapa
- Preceded by: Himself (Note: As Vice Chairman of the Council of Ministers)
- Succeeded by: Madhav Kumar Nepal (1994) (Note: There was no deputy prime minister from September 26, 1968, until November 30, 1994)

Vice Chairman of the Council of Ministers of Nepal
- In office 14 February 2005 – 15 April 2006 Serving with Tulsi Giri
- Monarch: Gyanendra
- Preceded by: Bharat Mohan Adhikari (Note: As Deputy Prime Minister)
- Succeeded by: K. P. Sharma Oli; Amik Sherchan
- In office 27 January 1965 – 27 January 1967
- Monarch: Mahendra
- Chairman: Surya Bahadur Thapa
- Preceded by: Surya Bahadur Thapa
- Succeeded by: Himself
Ministerial offices
Minister of Foreign Affairs of Nepal
In office 13 April 1979 – 30 May 1979
Monarch	Birendra
Prime Minister	Himself
Preceded by	Krishna Raj Aryal
Succeeded by	K. B. Shahi
In office 29 August 1971 – 16 April 1972
Monarch	Birendra
Prime Minister	Himself
Preceded by	Gehendra Bahadur Rajbhandari
Succeeded by	Gyanendra Bahadur Karki
In office 24 December 1963 – 26 September 1968
Monarch	Mahendra
Prime Minister	Tulsi Giri; Surya Bahadur Thapa
Preceded by	Tulsi Giri
Succeeded by	Gehendra Bahadur Rajbhandari
Minister of Finance
In office 10 December 1978 – 14 April 1979
Monarch	Birendra
Prime Minister	Himself
Preceded by	Bhekh Bahadur Thapa
Succeeded by	Ram Prasad Rajbahak (Note: Minister of State for Finance)
In office 14 April 1971 – 16 July 1973
Monarch	Birendra
Prime Minister	Himself
Preceded by	Gehendra Bahadur Rajbhandari
Succeeded by	Gyanendra Bahadur Karki
In office 7 April 1969 – 13 April 1970
Monarch	Mahendra
Prime Minister	Himself
Preceded by	Surya Bahadur Basnet
Succeeded by	Gehendra Bahadur Rajbhandari
Minister of Defence of Nepal
In office 12 September 1977 – 13 April 1979
Monarch	Birendra
Prime Minister	Himself
Preceded by	Tulsi Giri
Succeeded by	Shridhar Shumsher Jung Bahadur Rana (Note: As Minister of State for Defence)
In office 14 April 1971 – 16 July 1973
Monarch	Birendra
Prime Minister	Himself
Preceded by	Giri Prasad Burathoki
Succeeded by	Nagendra Prasad Rijal
Minister of Education of Nepal
In office 10 August 1966 – 29 May 1967
Monarch	Mahendra
Chairman	Surya Bahadur Thapa
Preceded by	Pushkar Nath Upreti
Succeeded by	Surendra Bahadur Basnet
In office 2 July 1962 – 16 June 1965
Monarch	Mahendra
Chairman	Tulsi Giri; Surya Bahadur Thapa
Preceded by	Anirudra Prasad Singh
Succeeded by	Pushkar Nath Upreti
Minister of Construction, Communications and Transport of Nepal
In office 2 April 1963 – 9 April 1964
Monarch	Mahendra
Chairman	Tulsi Giri
Preceded by	Lalit Chand
Succeeded by	Nageshwar Prasad Singh

Personal details
- Born: 15 January 1927 Thamel, Kathmandu, Nepal
- Died: 11 November 2017 (aged 90) Gyaneshwar, Kathmandu, Nepal
- Citizenship: Nepalese
- Occupation: Politician

Kirti Nidhi Bista (Nepali: कीर्तिनिधि विष्ट; 15 January 1927 – 11 November 2017) was a Nepali politician who served as the 25th prime minister of Nepal.

== Biography ==
Bista was born in Thamel, Kathmandu, Nepal in 1927. He served as prime minister of Nepal from 1969 to 1970, 1971 to 1973 and 1977 to 1979. He was minister of finance from 1969 to 1970 and from 1971 to 1973 AD.

After the coup d'état of King Gyanendra in 2005 AD, Bista was appointed one of the vice-chairmen until the government collapsed in April 2006 after the people's uprising. He is best remembered for resigning from the prime ministerial post after Singha Durbar burned down in 1973.

Bista died at his residence in Gyaneshwor on 11 November 2017. He was 90 years old at that time. Bista had been battling a long-term cancer.

== Notes ==
Political offices
Preceded by Surya Bahadur Thapa	Prime Minister of Nepal; 1969–1970	Succeeded by direct rule by King Mahendra
Preceded by direct rule by King Mahendra	Prime Minister of Nepal; 1971–1973	Succeeded by Nagendra Prasad Rijal
Preceded by Tulsi Giri	Prime Minister of Nepal; 1977–1979	Succeeded by Surya Bahadur Thapa
