= Madhukar Shamsher Rana =

Nepalese development economist

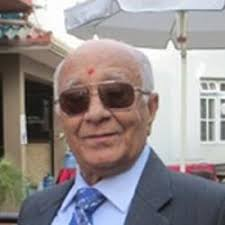
Madhukar SJB Rana

Madhukar Shamsher Rana (Nepali: मधुकर सम्शेर राणा) (19 July 1941 – 16 October 2019) was a Nepalese development economist, who served as Minister of Finance of Nepal in 2005, and was Professor of economics at the South Asian Institute of Management in Nepal. He was a member of the Rana dynasty of Nepal.

He was the founder of the first finance company in Nepal called Nepal Finance Company Ltd. (NEFINSCO).

When he was the General Manager of the government owned National Trading Limited in the early '70s, he left the company with a USD 15 million profit on its books, the only GM of National Trading to ever do so. Further when he was the chief advisor in the Ministry of Foreign affairs in the 90’s, he effectively got implemented the decentralisation of the distribution of passports.
