= Financial Comptroller General Office (Nepal) =

Financial Comptroller General Office महालेखा नियन्त्रक कार्यालय Mahalekha Niyantrak Karyalay

Agency overview
- Formed: December 17, 2008

Jurisdictional structure
- Operations jurisdiction: Nepal

Operational structure
- Headquarters: Anamnagar, Kathmandu, Nepal
- Elected officer responsible: Swarnim Wagle, Finance Minister
- Agency executive: Mr. Shova Kanta Paudel, Financial Controller General
- Parent agency: Ministry of Finance, Government of Nepal

Website
- www.fcgo.gov.np

Financial Comptroller General Office (FCGO) is the main government agency responsible for the treasury operation of Government of Nepal. This office is under the Ministry of Finance and is headed by Financial Comptroller General (FCG) who is a special class officer of Government of Nepal. The current FCG is Mr. Shova Kanta Poudel. FCGO is responsible for overseeing all government expenditure against budget, tracking revenue collection and other receipts and preparation of consolidated financial statements of the government.
