= Tulsi Giri =

Nepali politician (1926–2018)

- तुलसी गिरी
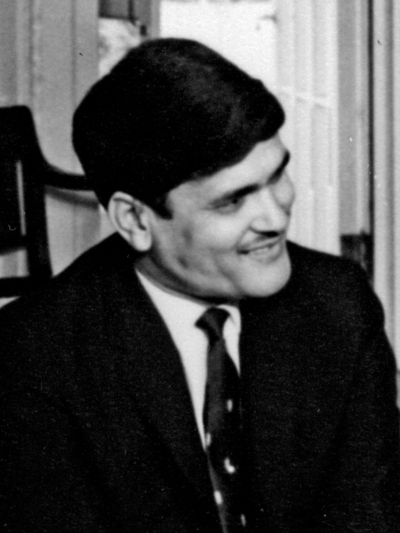
- Tulsi Giri in 1963

Prime Minister of Nepal
- In office 1 December 1975 – 12 September 1977
- Monarch: Birendra
- Preceded by: Nagendra Prasad Rijal
- Succeeded by: Kirti Nidhi Bista
- In office 26 February 1964 – 26 January 1965
- Monarch: Mahendra
- Preceded by: Surya Bahadur Thapa
- Succeeded by: Surya Bahadur Thapa
- In office 2 April 1963 – 23 December 1963
- Monarch: Mahendra
- Preceded by: B. P. Koirala (1960)
- Succeeded by: Surya Bahadur Thapa
Ministerial offices
Minister of Defence
In office 1976–1977
Preceded by	Nagendra Prasad Rijal
Succeeded by	Kritinidi Bista
In office 1960–1965
Preceded by	B. P. Koirala
Succeeded by	Surya Bahadur Thapa
Minister of Foreign Affairs
In office 1962–1963
Preceded by	Rishikesh Shah
Succeeded by	Kirti Nidhi Bista
In office 1960–1962
Preceded by	B. P. Koirala
Succeeded by	Rishikesh Shah

Personal details
- Born: 26 September 1926 Siraha, Siraha, Nepal
- Died: 18 December 2018 (aged 92) Budhanilkantha, Kathmandu, Nepal

Tulsi Giri (Maithili: तुलसी गिरि; 26 September 1926 – 18 December 2018) was a Nepali politician who served as the 23rd Prime Minister of Nepal from 1975 to 1977, and chairman of the Council of Ministers (a de facto Prime Ministerial position) in 1963, and again in 1964 and 1965.

He was born in Siraha District, Nepal in 1926. Tulsi was a Minister in the Congress government of 1959−1960 before its dissolution by King Mahendra. He became the first Prime Minister following the two-year direct rule of Mahendra. He studied at the Suri Vidyasagar College, when it was affiliated with the University of Calcutta. He received a medical degree prior to entering politics.

Tulsi was married 3 times and had 2 sons and 4 daughters; his third wife Sarah Giri, worked as a deaf-rights advocate. As of 2013 they had been married 34 years. As an adult Tulsi was baptized to his wife's faith, Jehovah's Witnesses. He resigned as chairman Rastriya Panchayat in 1986 and moved to Sri Lanka where he stayed for two years and then finally settled in Bangalore, India until 2005. He died on 18 December 2018, at his home in Budhanilkantha, Kathmandu aged 92, from liver cancer.

Political offices
Preceded by B. P. Koirala	Prime Minister of Nepal; 1963	Succeeded by Surya Bahadur Thapa
Preceded by Surya Bahadur Thapa	Prime Minister of Nepal; 1964 – 1965	Succeeded by Surya Bahadur Thapa
Preceded by Nagendra Prasad Rijal	Prime Minister of Nepal; 1975 – 1977	Succeeded by Kirti Nidhi Bista
