= Onsari Gharti Magar =

Nepali politician

- ओनसरी घर्ति मगर

Member of Parliament, House of Representatives
- In office 4 March 2018 – 18 September 2022

Speaker of the House of Representatives
- In office 16 October 2015 – 15 October 2017
- President: Ram Baran Yadav; Bidya Devi Bhandari
- Deputy: Ganga Prasad Yadav
- Preceded by: Subas Chandra Nemwang (as Chairman of the Constituent Assembly)
- Succeeded by: Krishna Bahadur Mahara (as Speaker of Pratinidhi Sabha)

Minister for Youth and Sports
- In office 2011–2011
- Prime Minister: Jhala Nath Khanal

Member of Legislature Parliament
- In office 21 January 2014 – 15 October 2017
- Preceded by: Santosh Kumar Budhamagar
- Succeeded by: Constituency abolished
- Constituency: Rolpa 2

Member of Constituent Assembly for CPN (Maoist) party list
- In office 28 May 2008 – 28 May 2012

Personal details
- Born: 13 November 1977 (age 48) Rolpa
- Party: CPN (Maoist Centre)
- Spouse: Barsaman Pun
- Children: 2
- Parents: Prasad Gharti (father); Naumati Gharti (mother)

Onsari Gharti Magar (Nepali: ओनसरी घर्तिमगर) is a Nepali communist politician and former parliamentarian. She was the first female Speaker of the House of Representatives. She was elected unopposed as Speaker on October 16, 2015.

== Political career ==
She served as Deputy Speaker of Parliament and was Minister of Youth and Sports in the cabinet of Jhala Nath Khanal. She was elected to the Constituent Assembly (CA) from Rolpa constituency-2 in the second CA election. She was elected to the House of Representatives in 2017 under party list.

== Electoral history ==
2013 Constituent Assembly election

Rolpa-2

Party	Candidate	Votes	Status
Unified Communist Party of Nepal (Maoist)	Onsari Gharti Magar	14,964	Elected
CPN (UML)	Kumar Dashaudi	9,372	Lost

== Personal life ==
She is married to Barsha Man Pun, the former secretary of the Communist Party of Nepal (Maoist-Centre).
