= Prachanda Gorkha =

The Prachanda Gorkha (Nepali: प्रचण्ड गोर्खा) was a secret society launched to overthrow the Rana dynasty from power in Nepal.

It was founded by Upendra Bikram Shah, Khadga Man Singh, Ranga Nath Sharma, and Maina Bahadur in 1927 in Kathmandu. It is recognised as the first political party of Nepal.

The Prachanda Gorkha had planned to bomb Ranas, however, their plan was exposed to the Ranas who jailed members of the group.

The Praja Parishad was inspired by the Prachanda Gorkha.
