= Yuba Raj Khatiwada =

Nepalese economist

Ambassador of Nepal to the United States
- In office 17 February 2021 – 21 September 2021
- President: Bidya Devi Bhandari
- Prime Minister: Sher Bahadur Deuba
- Preceded by: Arjun Karki

Minister for Finance
- In office 26 February 2018 – 4 September 2020 (Note: Khatiwada was Minister of Finance from 26 February 2018 and Minister for Information and Communications from 20 February 2020 but had to resign from both ministerial posts on 3 March 2020 when his two-year term in the National Assembly ended, however he was reappointed the next day.)
- President: Bidya Devi Bhandari
- Prime Minister: KP Sharma Oli
- Preceded by: Gyanendra Bahadur Karki
- Succeeded by: Bishnu Prasad Paudel

Minister for Information and Communications
- In office 20 February 2020 – 4 September 2020
- President: Bidya Devi Bhandari
- Prime Minister: KP Sharma Oli
- Preceded by: Gokul Prasad Baskota
- Succeeded by: Parbat Gurung

Nominated Member of the National Assembly
- In office 10 March 2018 – 3 March 2020
- Preceded by: Assembly reinstated
- Succeeded by: Bam Dev Gautam

15th Governor of Nepal Rastra Bank
- In office 22 March 2010 – 19 March 2015
- Preceded by: Deependra Bahadur Kshetry
- Succeeded by: Chiranjivi Nepal

Vice Chairman of the National Planning Commission
- In office November 2015 – August 2016
- Preceded by: Dr Govinda Pokharel
- Succeeded by: Min Bahadur Shrestha
- In office June 2009 – March 2010
- Preceded by: Dr Guna Nidhi Sharma
- Succeeded by: Jagadish Chandra Pokharel

Personal details
- Born: 14 August 1956 (age 70) Taplejung, Nepal
- Party: Nepal Communist Party (NCP)
- Education: Tribhuvan University; University of Delhi (PhD)
- Profession: Politician, Economist

Yuba Raj Khatiwada (Note: Nepali: युवराज खतिवडा) (born 14 August 1956) is a former Nepali politician and economist who has served as the Ambassador of Nepal to the United States since 17 February 2021. As the residential ambassador of Nepal to the US, he was also the non-residential ambassador to Panama, Costa Rica, Mexico, El Salvador, Honduras, and Guatemala and was entitled to look after the affairs related to the World Bank, IMF, and the World Bank Group (IBRD, IDA, IFC, MIGA and ICSID). He was a member of the National Assembly from 2018 to 2020 and was a minister in the cabinet of KP Sharma Oli from February 2018 to September 2020. He previously served as the governor of the Nepal Rastra Bank, as well as the vice-chair of the National Planning Commission.

== Political career ==
Khatiwada served as a nominated member of National Assembly from 2018 to 2020. He was appointed Minister of Finance on 26 February 2018. After the resignation of Gokul Prasad Baskota, he was given the portfolio of Information and Communications as well on 20 February 2020, becoming the spokesperson of the Government of Nepal. Khatiwada resigned from both ministerial posts on 3 March 2020 when his two-year term in the National Assembly ended, however he was reappointed the next day. As any member of the cabinet must become a member of either houses of the parliament within six months of appointment, Khatiwada resigned from the cabinet on 4 September 2020 when he was not renominated and Bam Dev Gautam was nominated to succeed him in the National Assembly. Subsequently, he was appointed as a special economic advisor to the prime minister with benefits on par with a minister. On 1 October 2020, the cabinet recommended Khatiwada as Nepal's Ambassador to the United States of America. He was appointed ambassador by president Bidya Devi Bhandari on 22 December 2020, and presented his credentials to the president of the United States, Joe Biden, on 17 February 2021.

== Economist career ==
Khatiwada served two tenures as the vice chairman of the National Planning Commission, first from June 2009 to March 2010 and again from November 2015 to August 2016. Between those two tenures at the planning commission, he served as the 15th Governor of the Nepal Rastra Bank, the central bank of Nepal. He also served as the senior economist in the regional centre of UNDP for Asia and the Pacific for the United Nations from 2006 to 2009. He had also been appointed member of the National Planning Commission from 2002 to 2005.

Khatiwada was the Head of the Economic Research Department of the Nepal Rastra Bank from 1999 to 2002, a postgraduate teacher at Tribhuvan University in 1982, and intermittently, a visiting faculty member at Tribhuvan University and Kathmandu University from 1992 to 2001. He received his master's degrees in Economics and Public Administration from Tribhuvan University in 1981 and 1984 respectively, and a PhD in Monetary Economics from Delhi School of Economics, University of Delhi in 1991.

== Awards and recognitions ==
Khatiwada has been awarded national awards such as the Suprabal Gorkha Dakshin Bahu (2001), Sukirtimaya Rastra Deep (2013) and Prasiddha Prabal Jana Sewa Shree (2016) conferred by the President of Nepal for his outstanding contribution to the development of Nepal in his different capacities.
