= Bhaskar Thapa =

- Born: September 7, 1963
- Died: June 19, 2013 (aged 49); San Francisco, California
- Education: UC Berkeley, Carnegie Mellon University

Bhaskar Thapa (Nepali: भाष्कर थापा) (September 7, 1963 – June 19, 2013) was a Nepalese-American tunnel engineer who led the engineering of the Caldecott Tunnel Fourth Bore project. He is considered an expert of the New Austrian tunnelling method (NATM). The Caldecott Tunnel passes through California State Route 24 and connects Alameda County and Contra Costa County, California. The project had an estimated cost of $391 million He had presented his tunnel technology programme at Ministry of Physical Infrastructure and Transport (Nepal) and was very keen to work on Kathmandu Terai Fast Track. He is a member of Jacobs Associates, an engineering firm based on California. He has received his PhD on geotechnical engineering from UC Berkeley and an engineering degrees from Carnegie Mellon University. He died from heart failure while playing tennis on June 19, 2013. A plaque rests above the Caldecott Tunnel in Oakland, California in tribute of Bhaskar's work and life.

Bhaskar enjoyed seeing the fruits of his labors after when the tunneling and final lining were completed on this challenging project. He was incredibly proud of this achievement, and we often spoke about the pride he would feel when driving his two boys and wife through the tunnel. -Michael McRae, Principal, Jacobs Associates

In 2016, the Bhaskar Tejshree Memorial Foundation released a compilation book of works done on tunnel engineering by Bhaskar.

== Family ==
Bhaskar is the son of diplomat and former minister Dr. Bhekh Bahadur Thapa and public health specialist Dr. Rita Thapa. He grew up in Kathmandu, Nepal. He has two sisters, Manjushree Thapa and Tejshree. Bhaskar grew up in Nepal and attended university in the United States, where he completed his Bachelors, Masters, and PhD in civil engineering. Bhaskar and his wife, Sumira, have two sons.
