= Tejshree Thapa =

Nepalese human rights lawyer (1966–2019)

- Born: November 10, 1966; Kathmandu, Nepal
- Died: March 26, 2019 (aged 52); New York City, New York
- Education: Wellesley College; Cornell Law School
- Occupation: Human rights lawyer
- Organization(s): International Criminal Tribunal for the former Yugoslavia; Human Rights Watch

Tejshree Thapa (10 November 1966 – 26 March 2019) was a Nepalese human rights lawyer. She was recognized for her role in investigating and documenting human rights violations, including widespread sexual violence and other atrocities committed during the Yugoslav Wars, the Sri Lanka Civil War, and the Nepal Civil War.

== Early life and education ==
Thapa was born in 1966 in Kathmandu, Nepal. Her father, Bhekh Bahadur Thapa, held several government positions (including Nepal's foreign minister); her mother, Dr. Rita (Basnet) Thapa, worked as a public health specialist, focusing on maternal health and family planning.

Thapa's family emigrated to Canada when she was a young child, for a brief spell of three years. They subsequently moved back to Nepal, where her father held several government offices including minister of finance. Her mother meanwhile worked for the WHO in the field of public health, with a focus on maternal and child mortality. In 1979, her family moved to Washington, DC., when her father was named Nepal's ambassador to the United States. She attended National Cathedral School. She graduated with a Bachelor of Arts in philosophy from Wellesley College, before earning a law degree from Cornell Law School in 1993.

== Career ==
After law school, Thapa worked for Radhika Coomaraswamy, the first United Nations special rapporteur on violence against women. In this role, Thapa interviewed survivors and perpetrators of gender-based violence, contributing to a report for the UN Commission on Human Rights.

Thapa then worked for the International Criminal Tribunal for the former Yugoslavia, based in The Hague, leading a unit that investigated and documented abuses that occurred in the Yugoslav wars. She was credited with helping to win the Foca cases, which involved sexual crimes committed against Muslim women in the town of Foca, Bosnia, in 1992 and 1993. Her work led to the convictions of eight Serb paramilitary leaders and their supporters, the first prosecution and conviction exclusively for sexual violence crimes under international criminal law.

Thapa was also recognized for her role in building a case against Slobdan Milosevic, the former president of Yugoslavia and Serbia, who was tried on charges of genocide and crimes against humanity.

In 2004, Thapa joined Human Rights Watch, working as a researcher (later Senior Researcher) on South Asia. She documented sexual violence and other human rights violations that occurred during the civil wars in Sri Lanka and Nepal, as well as in Bangladesh. Her work there helped force the United Nations to acknowledge its failure in protecting civilians during the Sri Lankan Civil War, and prompted the UN to establish Human Rights Up Front, an initiative to promote the importance of early response to human rights violations. Her team comprehensively documented the recruitment of child soldiers by the Liberation Tigers of Tamil Eelam. In 2017, Thapa documented the Myanmar military's ethnic cleansing of Rohingya Muslims along the Bangladesh-Myanmar border, one of the first human rights workers to do so.

== Personal life and death ==
Thapa was married twice and has a daughter, born in 2000, from the second marriage.

In March 2019, Thapa died in New York City from multiple organ failure, following a sudden illness.
