= Rameshwor Prasad Khanal =

Nepali economist and civil servant

- रामेश्वरप्रसाद खनाल

Minister of Finance
- In office 15 September 2025 – 27 March 2026
- President: Ram Chandra Paudel
- Prime Minister: Sushila Karki (interim)
- Preceded by: Bishnu Prasad Paudel
- Succeeded by: Swarnim Wagle

Personal details
- Born: June 16, 1956 (age 70) Tansen, Palpa, Kingdom of Nepal
- Party: Independent
- Education: Tribhuvan University (BCom, MBA); ACMA (India)
- Profession: Civil servant

Rameshwor Prasad Khanal is a retired Nepali civil servant. He served as the Minister of Finance and Minister of Federal Affairs and General Administration in the interim government led by Sushila Karki in 2025. He is a former finance secretary of the Government of Nepal. As Chairperson of the High-Level Economic Reforms Commission of Nepal, he submitted a comprehensive report to the Deputy Prime Minister and Finance Minister proposing wide-ranging reforms to the country's economy.
