= Khadga Man Singh =

Nepalese politician

Khanda Man Singh Basnet (Nepali: खड्गमान सिंह) was a Nepalese politician.

Singh was born in March 1907 in Kathmandu, Nepal.

In 1927, he with others founded the Prachanda Gorkha, a secret society launched to overthrow the Rana dynasty from power in Nepal.

He died of tuberculosis. Singh was a descendant of Abhiman Singh Basnyat.

== Works ==
- Singh, Khadga Man (1980). A Retrospect on Democracy: Party and Panchayat.
- Jelama bisa varsha, Rajabandika Samsmarana, lekhaka Khadga mana Simfa. publisher not identified.
- Jelabāṭa bāhira cālīsa varsha: prajātāntrika vivecanā (in Nepali). Sumīravikrama Siṃha. 1991.
