= Minister of Energy, Water Resources and Irrigation =

Nepali federal cabinet position

- ऊर्जा, जलस्रोत तथा सिंचाइ मन्त्री
- Emblem of Nepal

- Flag of Nepal

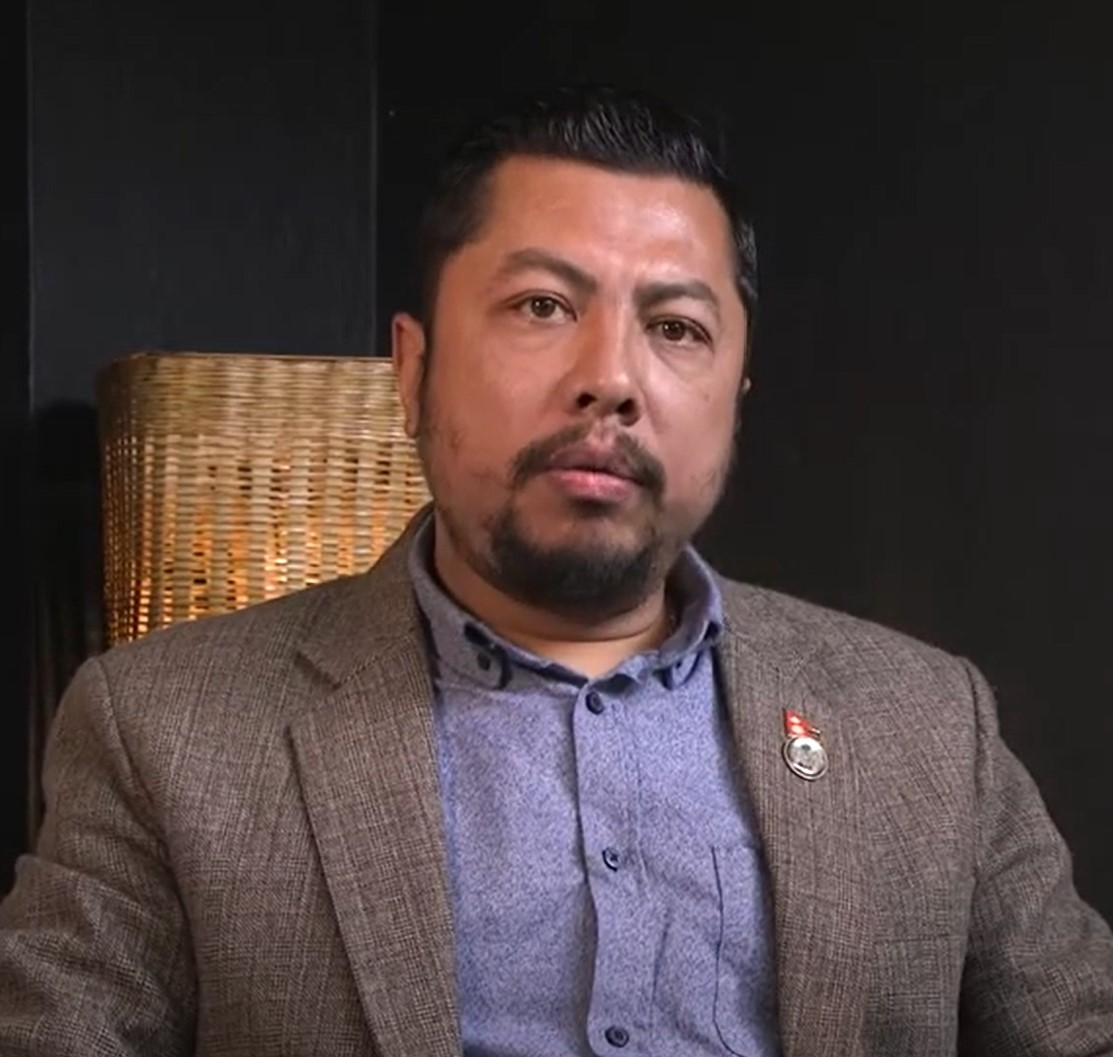
- Incumbent; Biraj Bhakta Shrestha since 27 March 2026
- Ministry of Energy, Water Resources and Irrigation
- Style: Honourable
- Member of: Council of Ministers
- Reports to: Prime Minister, Parliament
- Seat: Singha Durbar, Nepal
- Nominator: Prime Minister
- Appointer: President
- Term length: No fixed term
- Precursor: Minister of Energy; Minister of Water Resources and Irrigation

The Minister of Energy, Water Resources and Irrigation (Nepali: ऊर्जा, जलस्रोत तथा सिँचाइ मन्त्री) is the head of the Ministry of Energy, Water Resources and Irrigation. One of the senior officers in the Federal Cabinet, the minister is responsible for formulating and promoting policies related to water resources, energy and irrigation in the country.

The current minister is Biraj Bhakta Shrestha who took office on 27 March 2026.

== List of former ministers ==
#	Name	Took of office			Prime Minister	Minister's Party
1	Barsaman Pun	16 March 2018	20 December 2020	1,010	KP Sharma Oli	CPN (MC)
1	Barsaman Pun	16 March 2018	20 December 2020	1,010	KP Sharma Oli	NCP
2	Top Bahadur Rayamajhi	25 December 2020	20 May 2021	146	KP Sharma Oli	NCP
2	Top Bahadur Rayamajhi	25 December 2020	20 May 2021	146	KP Sharma Oli	CPN (MC)
3	Sharat Singh Bhandari	4 June 2021	22 June 2021	18	KP Sharma Oli	PSP–Nepal
4	Bishnu Prasad Paudel	24 June 2021	12 July 2021	18	KP Sharma Oli	CPN (UML)
5	Pampha Bhusal	13 July 2021	26 December 2022	531	Sher Bahadur Deuba	CPN (MC)
–	Pushpa Kamal Dahal	26 December 2022	17 January 2023	22	Pushpa Kamal Dahal	CPN (MC)
6	Rajendra Prasad Lingden	17 January 2023	25 February 2023	39	Pushpa Kamal Dahal	RPP
–	Pushpa Kamal Dahal	25 February 2023	31 March 2023	34	Pushpa Kamal Dahal	CPN (MC)
7	Shakti Bahadur Basnet	31 March 2023	4 March 2024	339	Pushpa Kamal Dahal	CPN (MC)
–	Pushpa Kamal Dahal	4 March 2023	6 March 2023	2	Pushpa Kamal Dahal	CPN (MC)
8	Shakti Bahadur Basnet	6 March 2024	15 July 2024	131	Pushpa Kamal Dahal	CPN (MC)
9	Deepak Khadka	15 July 2024	9 September 2025	421	KP Sharma Oli	Nepali Congress
Vacant (9 – 12 September 2025)
–	Sushila Karki	12 September 2025	15 September 2025	3	Sushila Karki	Independent
10	Kulman Ghising	15 September 2025	7 January 2026	114	Sushila Karki	Independent
11	Anil Kumar Sinha	7 January 2026	27 March 2026	79	Sushila Karki	Independent
12	Biraj Bhakta Shrestha	27 March 2026	Incumbent	164	Balen Shah	RSP
