= Rabindra Nath Sharma =

Nepali politician

Minister of Foreign Affairs
- In office 1997
- Preceded by: Prakash Chandra Lohani
- Succeeded by: Prakash Chandra Lohani

Personal details
- Party: Rashtriya Prajatantra Party

Rabindra Nath Sharma (Nepali: रविन्द्रनाथ शर्मा) (died 22 November 2008) was a Nepalese politician, leader of the Rastriya Prajatantra Party and Minister of Finance of Nepal from 1997 to 1998.

Sharma was one of the few Nepali leaders that continued to advocate for a Hindu constitutional monarchy after the Parliament scrapped the Kings major powers in June 2006. His advocacy provided a much-needed backbone to those calling for a Hindu state under a constitutional monarchy at a time when the communists were engaged in political and institutional capture. In January 2008 under Sharma's leadership RPP-Nepal organized the first mass protests against the Maoist's decision to declare Nepal a republic without a referendum

In October 2006 Sharma was “unanimously” elected the chairman of the Rastriya Prajatantra Party (RPP)-Nepal after Kamal Thapa quit the post Sharma is widely credited to have been an important political and moral force to keep the debate about future of Hinduism in a secular Republic alive. For this advocacy for a Hindu constitutional monarchy and against growing Christian proselytization, goons of the CPN-Maoists attacked Sharma and his followers in Bhitamode, Nepal and then Pokhara. In 2009, a few months after Sharma's death, the Unified Maoists-affiliated All Nepal Peasants' Organisation-Revolutionary (ANPO-R) attacked and seized is land in Nawalparasi.

Sharma's politics lead him to gain the soubriquet of ‘Chanakya’ of Nepalese politics.
