= Prakash Chandra Lohani =

Nepali politician

- प्रकाशचन्द्र लोहनी
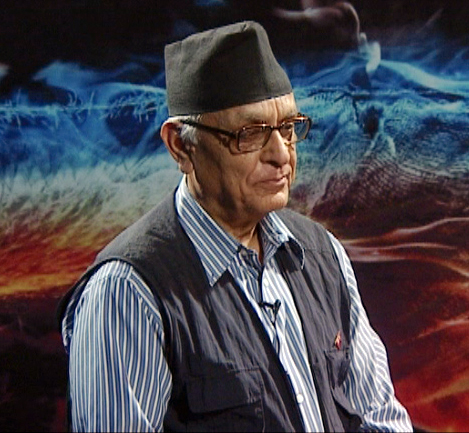
- In a program of Himalaya Television

Minister of Foreign Affairs
- In office 1997
- Preceded by: Rabindra Nath Sharma
- Succeeded by: Kamal Thapa
- In office 1995–1997
- Preceded by: Madhav Kumar Nepal
- Succeeded by: Rabindra Nath Sharma

Personal details
- Born: 21 April 1944 (age 82)
- Party: Rastriya Prajatantra Party

Prakash Chandra Lohani (Nepali: प्रकाशचन्द्र लोहनी) (born 21 April 1944) is a Nepalese politician, economist and member of the Rastriya Prajatantra Party. He has served as a Minister of Finance, Minister of Foreign Affairs, Minister of Agriculture, Minister of Labour & Transportation, and Minister of Housing & Physical Planning in governments formed during the panchayat era and in governments formed after the restoration of multi-party democracy. He has also served as an acting prime minister of Nepal.

== Career ==
Lohani was appointed Minister of Finance of Nepal in July 1983 and June 2003. During his tenure as the Finance Minister, for the first time in Nepal, he initiated the process of financial liberalization by introducing policies in favor of privatization of public enterprises. Growth in Nepal's financial market, especially the emergence of banking sectors, financial institutions can be attributed to the policies enacted by him during his tenure as a finance minister. Nepal's first joint venture backed bank, Nepal Arab Bank Limited (now Nabil Bank), was established during his tenure.

Lohani along with his love toward politics, has a keen interest in finance and economics. He has shared his ideas and views at various national and international forums such Woodrow Wilson International Center for Scholars in Washington, DC, (chairman) 41st session of the ESCAP in Bangkok and (chairman) Nepal Aid Group meeting in 2004. Lohani has also published papers in prestigious journals like the University of Chicago Journal of Political Economy.

He was a Fulbright scholar who taught as an assistant professor of finance at the California State University, Northridge, California, United States (1968–1969). Lohani received a Master of Business Administration degree from Indiana University School of Business in Bloomington in 1964 and PhD from University of California, Los Angeles (UCLA) in 1969.

Lohani was a member of Nepal's historic erstwhile Constituent Assembly, which had been tasked with drafting a new constitution. At present Lohani is the chairman of the Rastriya Prajatantra Party.

== Sources ==
- Bikash Sangraula (19 June 2006). "Rebel visit moves Nepal closer to peace". Christian Science Monitor.
- "Strong Development Partnership with ADB". Asian Development Bank. 19 December 2003. Archived from the original on 24 June 2007.
- "We Must Have Free Trade Now". Outlook India. February 1996. Archived from the original on 11 November 2006.
