= Kalibas =

Coordinates: 27.8000°N 85.2500°E

Kalibas कविलास
- Village development committee
- Interactive map of Kalibas
- Country: Nepal
- Zone: Bagmati Zone
- District: Nuwakot District

Population (1991)
  - Total: 3,708
- Time zone: UTC+5:45 (Nepal Time)

Kalibas is a village development committee in Nuwakot District in the Bagmati Zone of central Nepal. At the time of the 1991 Nepal census, it had a population of 3708 living in 671 individual households.
