= Gehendra Bahadur Rajbhandari =

Nepali politician (1923–1994)

- गेहेन्द्र बहादुर राजभण्डारी

Acting Prime Minister of Nepal
- In office 13 April 1970 – 14 April 1971
- Monarch: Mahendra
- Preceded by: Kirti Nidhi Bista
- Succeeded by: Kirti Nidhi Bista

Personal details
- Born: November 1923
- Died: 23 August 1994 (aged 70)

Gehendra Bahadur Rajbhandari (Nepali: गेहेन्द्र बहादुर राजभण्डारी; November 1923 – 23 August 1994) was the most senior Minister (working with responsibility of the Prime Minister) in Nepal from 13 April 1970 to 14 April 1971. In 1969, Rajbhandari served as the Minister for Palace Affairs and Foreign Affairs, as well as the leader of the Nepalese delegation to the United Nations.

Rajbhandari served in the Nepalese government between 1951 and 1961 as Joint Secretary and Secretary in Ministries of Health. He pioneered in the field of education, helping establish the Adarsha Kanya Niketan (girls school in Patan), serving as a board member of Machhindra High School (Lagankhel, Lalitpur), and teaching in Patan College, Mahendra Ratna College, and Tribhuvan University. He also established Nepal Commerce College (Nepal Commerce Campus) as the founding Principal, later becoming involved in politics and serving as Minister of Home, Information, Foreign Affairs, Education, Health, Defense, Palace Affairs, and Finance (1970-1971). In later years Rajbhandari became the Royal Nepalese Ambassador to Bangladesh.

In the social field, he was a founding member of the Lalitpur Red Cross Chapter, Lalit Graduate Circle, and Nepal Professors Association. He also paid a friendly visit to the Soviet Union in 1969. He died on 23 August 1994 at the age of 70.
