= National Planning Commission of Nepal =

Nepal government commission and advisory agency

Agency overview
- Formed: 1956
- Jurisdiction: Nepal
- Headquarters: Singha Durbar, Kathmandu
- Minister responsible: Balendra Shah, Prime Minister of Nepal
- Agency executive: Dr. Gunakar Bhatta, Vice Chairperson
- Website: https://npc.gov.np/

National Planning Commission (NPC) of Nepal is advisory body for formulating development plans and policies of the country under the directives of the National Development Council of the government of Nepal. It is the apex advisory body of the Government of Nepal for formulating a national vision, periodic plans and policies for development. It is headed by the Right Honorable Prime Minister. The NPC assesses resource needs, identifies sources of funding, and allocates budget for socio-economic development. It serves as a central agency for monitoring and evaluating development plans, policies and programs. The NPC also serves as an intellectual hub for the exchange of new development ideas and proposals from scholars, private sector, civil society, and development partners.

== History ==
The Planning Commission was first created in Nepal in 1956. It was soon renamed in accordance with the Yojana Mandal Act of 1957. Following the introduction of the partyless Panchayat system in 1961, the National Planning Council was formed under the then king. In 1963, the council was dissolved and a new planning body, with an identical name, was constituted under the Chairman of the Council of Ministers. All the Ministers became ex-officio members of the council; and the Ministry of Economic Affairs was renamed the Ministry of Economic Planning.

In 1968, all tasks related to development budget and foreign aid hitherto carried out by the Ministry of Economic Planning were assigned to the Ministry of Finance. The National Planning Council then morphed into the National Planning Commission (NPC) under the Chairmanship of the Prime Minister. A 1972 study on the functions and responsibilities of the central planning agency resulted in the reconstitution of the NPC.

After the historic restoration of multiparty democracy in 1990, the newly elected government reconstituted the NPC again with the Prime Minister as chair, a full-time vice-chairman, five Members, and a Member-Secretary. The current organization and functions of the NPC draw on the Executive Order issued by the cabinet in 2010.
