= Bharat Mohan Adhikari =

Nepali politician and freedom fighter (1936–2019)

- भरतमोहन अधिकारी

Minister of Finance
- In office 30 November 1994 – 12 September 1995
- Monarch: Birendra
- Prime Minister: Man Mohan Adhikari
- Preceded by: Mahesh Acharya
- Succeeded by: Ram Saran Mahat

Minister of Finance
- In office December 1998 – May 1999
- Monarch: Birendra
- Prime Minister: Girija Prasad Koirala
- Preceded by: Ram Saran Mahat
- Succeeded by: Mahesh Acharya

Minister of Finance, Deputy prime minister (Nepal)
- In office 2004–2005
- Monarch: Gyanendra
- Prime Minister: Sher Bahadur Deuba

Personal details
- Born: 4 May 1936 Mahottari District, Kingdom of Nepal
- Died: 2 March 2019 (aged 82) HAMS Hospital, Kathmandu, Nepal
- Party: Nepal Communist Party
- Other political affiliations: CPN-UML (until 2018)
- Relatives: Man Mohan Adhikari (brother); BP Koirala(cousin)

Bharat Mohan Adhikari (Nepali: भरतमोहन अधिकारी) (4 May 1936 – 2 March 2019) was a Nepali politician, economist. He became the Minister of Finance of Nepal in the 1994-95 government of Prime Minister Man Mohan Adhikari. He was the first communist Finance Minister who championed the "Afno Gaun Afai Banau" (Nepali: आफ्नो गाउँ आफै बनाउँ; Develop our own village) campaign.

He also served as the deputy prime minister of Nepal in the Deuba cabinet (2004–05), which was later dissolved by King Gyanendra. Although a central figure of the CPN-UML, he was considered to have held more moderate views.

== Health and death ==
In 2012, he was at the Medanta Medicity Hospital in New Delhi for suspected valvular heart disease, but was not treated for the same. He died on 2 March 2019 from multiple organ failure stemming from a severe case of COPD.
