= Ministry of Finance (Nepal) =

Government ministry of Nepal

- अर्थ मन्त्रालय
- Emblem of Nepal

Ministry overview
- Formed: 1963; 63 years ago
- Jurisdiction: Government of Nepal
- Headquarters: Singha Durbar, Kathmandu
- Minister responsible: Swarnim Wagle, Cabinet Minister
- Ministry executives: Ghanshyam Upadhyaya, Finance Secretary; Shovakant Poudel, Financial Controller General
- Website: mof.gov.np

The Ministry of Finance (Nepali: अर्थ मन्त्रालय) is the central authority of Government of Nepal charged with the responsibilities for maintaining both micro and macro economic stability in the country.

The current Finance Minister of Nepal is Swarnim Wagle, who assumed office on 27 March 2026 after the formation of government under Prime Minister Balendra Shah.

== History ==
The predecessor of the Ministry of Finance of Nepal, the Ministry of Economic and Planning was established in 1963. In 1968, this Ministry was dissolved and the Ministry of Finance as well as the National Planning Commission of Nepal were set up. Ever since, the Ministry was the highest financial authority of Nepal.

== Mandate ==
The mandate of the ministry includes the following: Formulation, implementation, monitoring and evaluation of economic and revenue policy, financial administration and control of plans and programs, Financial analysis, Currency, determination and implementation of monetary policy. Also it is responsible for the Central Bank of Nepal, Nepal Rastra Bank (Including Nepal Industrial Development Corporation) and co-ordination with the World Bank, the International Monetary Fund, the Asian Development Bank and other International Financial Institutions.

== Structure and departments ==
The Ministry of Finance consists of the following five Departments:

1. Financial Comptroller General Office
2. Public Debt Management Office
3. Department of Customs
4. Inland Revenue Department
5. Public Finance Management Training Centre

The Ministry is divided into several divisions:

- Revenue Advisory Committee
- International Economic Cooperation Co-ordination Division
- Budget and Programme Division
- Corporation Co-ordination and Privatisation Division
- Revenue Administration Division
- Economic Affairs and Policy Analysis Division
- Administrative Division
- Legal Division
- Monitoring and Evaluation Division

== Former and current Finance Ministers ==
This is a list of all former Finance Ministers since the Nepalese Constituent Assembly election in 2013:

Key

- ‡- Current Finance Minister

SN	Name	Party	Assumed office	Left office
1	Ram Saran Mahat	Nepali Congress	25 February 2014	12 October 2015
2	Bishnu Prasad Paudel	Communist Party of Nepal (Unified Marxist–Leninist)	5 November 2015	1 August 2016
3	Krishna Bahadur Mahara	Communist Party of Nepal (Maoist Centre)	4 August 2016	31 May 2017
4	Gyanendra Bahadur Karki	Nepali Congress	7 June 2017	15 February 2018
5	Yuba Raj Khatiwada (Note: Khatiwada had to resign from his ministerial posts on 3 March 2020, as his two-year term in the Rastriya Sabha ended, however he was reappointed only on the next day.)	Communist Party of Nepal (NCP)	16 March 2018	4 September 2020
6	Bishnu Prasad Paudel	CPN UML	14 October 2020	13 July 2021
7	Janardan Sharma	CPN (Maoist)	13 July 2021	7 July 2022
8	Sher Bahadur Deuba	Nepali Congress	7 July 2022	July 31, 2022
7	Janardan Sharma	CPN (Maoist)	31 July 2022	26 December 2022
9	Bishnu Prasad Paudel	CPN UML	26 December 2022	27 February 2023
10	Prakash Sharan Mahat	Nepali Congress	31 March 2023	5 March 2024
11	Barsaman Pun	Nepal Communist Party	6 March 2024	15 July 2024
12	Bishnu Prasad Poudel	CPN UML	15 July 2024	9 September 2025
13	Rameshwor Prasad Khanal	Interim Government	15 September 2025	27 March 2026
14	‡ Swarnim Wagle	Rastriya Swatantra Party	27 March 2026	Incumbent

== See also ==
- Minister of Finance
