= 1st Nepalese Constituent Assembly =

2008–2012 unicameral legislature of Nepal

First Constituent Assembly of Nepal
| ← | Interim Parliament | 2nd Constituent Assembly | → |

Overview
- Legislative body: Constituent Assembly of Nepal
- Meeting place: International Convention Centre
- Term: 2008 – 2013
- Election: 2008 Nepalese Constituent Assembly election
- Government: First Dahal cabinet Madhav Nepal cabinet Khanal cabinet Bhattarai cabinet
- Members: 601

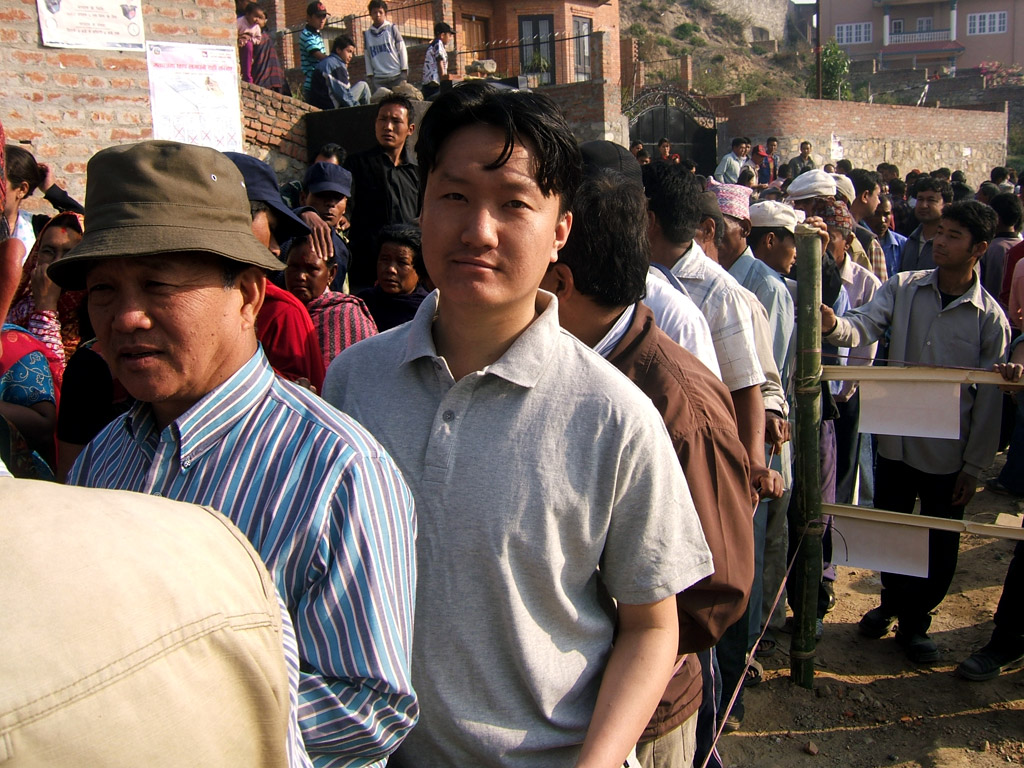
Voters line up during first Constituent Election 2008

The first Nepalese Constituent Assembly was a unicameral body of 601 members that served from May 28, 2008, to May 28, 2012. It was formed as a result of the first Constituent Assembly election held on April 10, 2008. The Constituent Assembly (CA) was tasked with writing a new constitution, and acting as the interim legislature for a term of two years.

240 members were elected in single-seat constituencies, 335 were elected through proportional representation, and the remaining 26 seats were reserved for nominated members. The Communist Party of Nepal (Maoist) [CPN (M)]—now re-formed as the Communist Party of Nepal (Maoist Centre)—was the largest party in the Constituent Assembly, having won half of the constituency seats and about 30% of proportional representation seats.

The CA declared a republic at its first meeting on May 28, 2008, abolishing the monarchy. In late June 2008, the parties agreed to divide the 26 nominated seats in the CA between nine parties: the CPN (M) was to receive nine of these seats, while the Nepali Congress (NC) and the Communist Party of Nepal (Unified Marxist-Leninist) [CPN (UML)] (which respectively placed second and third in the election) would each receive five, the Madhesi Janadhikar Forum would receive two, and the Sadbhavana Party, the Nepal Workers and Peasants Party, Janamorcha Nepal, and the Communist Party of Nepal (Marxist-Leninist) [CPN(M-L)] would each receive one nominated seat.

The CA was unable to draft a new constitution, and was dissolved on May 28, 2012, after its original and extended total tenure of four years. The next Nepalese Constituent Assembly elections initially slated for November 22, 2012 were held a year later on November 19, 2013, after being postponed several times. The Constitution of Nepal was successfully drafted by the 2nd Constituent Assembly and ultimately came into effect on 20 September 2015.

== Opening of the Constituent Assembly, declaration of the Republic ==
The official and final list of members elected under the proportional representation (PR) system was released on 8 May 2008; this meant the first meeting of the CA (which has to be held within 21 days of the publication of the final result) would be held before the end of May 2008. On 12 May 2008, it was announced that the first session of the CA would be held on 28 May 2008. The members of the CA were sworn in on 27 May 2008.

The composition of Constituent Assembly looked like this:

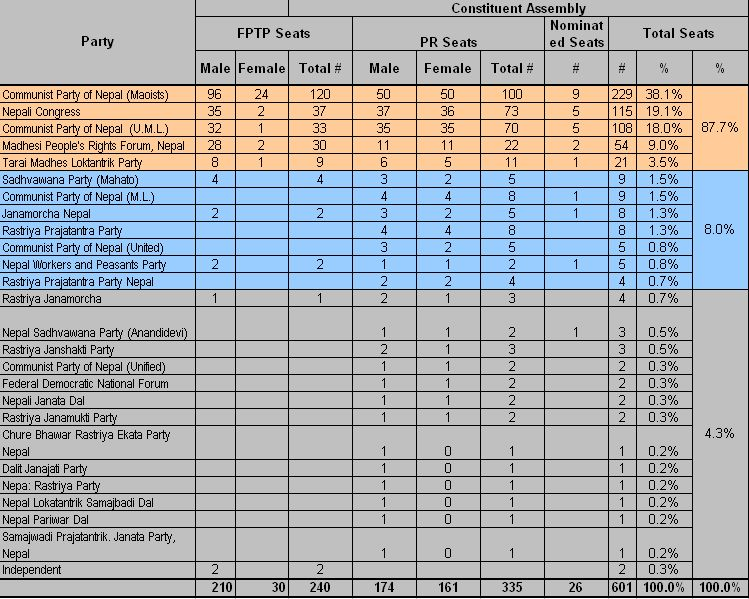

At the first session of the Constituent Assembly (CA) on 28 May, it voted to declare Nepal a federal democratic republic, thereby abolishing the monarchy. When the CA voted on this motion, of 564 members, 560 voted in favor and four opposed. Of all the parties represented in the CA, only the Rastriya Prajatantra Party Nepal (RPP-Nepal) opposed the motion. Koirala said that Nepal was entering a new era and that "the nation's dream has come true", while celebrations took place in Kathmandu; May 29 and May 30 were declared to be public holidays by the government. The CA also decided that Gyanendra should leave the Narayanhity Palace within 15 days.

Earlier on 28 May, the major parties agreed on the creation of the position of President, while the Prime Minister was to hold executive powers; however, they reached no agreement on exactly what powers the President should have or who should become president, and these deliberations led to a delay in the opening of the CA.

On 29 May, the royal standard was removed from Narayanhity Palace and replaced with the national flag. Gyanendra reportedly said on 2 June that he accepted the CA's decision.

== Power-sharing discussions ==
Thirteen parties, including the CPN (M), the NC, and the CPN (UML), met at the Ministry of Peace and Reconstruction on June 1; no agreement was reached regarding power arrangements. The CPN (M) pressed its demand for both the positions of President and Prime Minister, but the NC and CPN (UML) were unwilling to accept this. The NC wanted these positions to be chosen through a simple majority vote in the Constituent Assembly (CA).

Addressing a rally in Gorkha district on June 1, Prachanda gave Koirala an ultimatum to present his resignation to the CA within two or three days, warning that if he failed to do so, the Maoist members of the government would resign and the party would lead street protests.

After Gyanendra requested that the government make arrangements for his residence on June 1, the government decided on June 4 to give another palace, the Nagarjuna Palace, to Gyanendra. Also on June 4, Prachanda and Koirala met; at this meeting Prachanda demanded that the government step aside by June 5 and again threatened street protests. On the same day, the three main parties held a meeting at which they again failed to reach an agreement, but the parties agreed on the need for a few more days and the CPN (M) postponed its deadline for the government to step aside to allow for this period.

On June 5, the CPN (M) softened its position, deciding at a meeting of its Central Secretariat that it would not press its claim to the presidency and that it would instead favor having a member of civil society become president. The party expressed continued opposition to a proposal that would allow the Prime Minister to be dismissed by a simple majority vote of the CA. Despite the Maoist desire to have a neutral figure as president, the NC proposed Koirala for the position.

The CA held its second sitting on June 5; due to the three major parties' deadlock, this sitting was very brief, lasting less than a half hour, and took no major decisions.

On June 11, Gyanendra gave a brief press conference at Narayanhiti, stating his acceptance of the republic and promising cooperation. He also said that he intended to stay in Nepal, asserted that he held no property outside of Nepal, and expressed his hope that he would be allowed to keep his property. He left Narayanhiti on the same evening and went to his new residence at Nagarjuna.

Shortly after another meeting between Prachanda and Koirala, the CPN (M) ministers announced their resignations and sent a joint resignation letter to Prachanda on June 12. According to the CPN (M) Minister for Local Development, Dev Gurung, the purpose of the resignations was to "accelerate the process of formation of a new government and bring an end to the current transitional period". However, some considered the resignations to be a means of increasing pressure on Koirala. The resignations were not immediately submitted to Koirala by the CPN (M), and therefore were not made effective. Gurung said that he expected a coalition government to be formed by June 18.

Also on June 12, CPN (UML) General Secretary Jhala Nath Khanal asserted that a member of his party should become president. On June 14 he blamed the CPN (M) for the deadlock. At a meeting with Communist Party of Nepal (Marxist-Leninist) (2002) [CPN(M-L)(2002)] General Secretary C. P. Mainali on June 14, Koirala stressed the importance of power-sharing according to the popular mandate and consensus. Mainali expressed the view that the Maoists should be allowed to lead the government, while the post of President should go to someone from the NC and the post of Chairman of the CA should go to someone from the CPN (UML). Meanwhile, Prachanda rejected the possibility of Koirala becoming president, saying that this would be a "dishonour to the people's mandate"; he also expressed concern that having Koirala as president could cause the development of a separate power center from the government, in addition to noting Koirala's advanced age and health problems. Prachanda said that the President should come from a smaller party rather than from the NC or the CPN (UML).

Koirala said on June 15 that he would not "run around pleading" for the presidency. Prachanda, meanwhile, said that he expected the new government to be formed imminently, calling on other parties to support this and warning that anyone contravening the people's mandate would have a "heavy price" to pay. Another meeting of the three main parties on June 16 ended in continued disagreement on the key issues, and the CPN (M) said that it would submit the resignations of its ministers to Koirala if the next meeting on June 17 did not produce an agreement.

CPN (UML) General Secretary Khanal said on June 17 that it was important for the left-wing parties to work together. While saying that the CPN (UML) and the CPN (M) would cooperate in the future, he noted that it would be necessary for the parties to improve their difficult relationship. The CPN (M) Central Secretariat met on the same day and approved the decision to hold firm on the key issues and for its ministers to resign if an agreement was not reached later in the day. The party chose to support Ramraja Prasad Singh for the presidency. Upendra Yadav, the Coordinator of the Madhesi Janadhikar Forum, also said on June 17 that his party would not participate in the government and would instead be an opposition party, and he stressed the importance of cooperation among the Madhesi parties. Although he criticized the three main parties for focusing on their power struggle, he endorsed the Maoist claim to lead the government, while asserting that some of the key portfolios should be given to other parties.

The Constituent Assembly (CA) went into indefinite recess on June 18. The three main parties continued their discussions on that day, but did not reach an agreement. However, CPN (M) spokesman Krishna Bahadur Mahara said that they were getting closer to an agreement, and he said that the party had postponed its deadline to June 19.

On June 19, the three main parties reached an agreement providing for a constitutional amendment that would enable a government to be formed or dismissed by a simple majority vote of the CA, rather than the previously required two-thirds majority vote. An agreement was also concluded on the issue of integrating Maoist fighters into the national army. However, the parties did not yet agree on a way to resolve the question of power-sharing. Later that day, the Seven-Party Alliance held a meeting at which Koirala said that he was prepared to resign at any time.

The CPN (M) and the CPN (UML) leadership met early on June 20, and afterwards Khanal said that the CPN (M) had "responded positively" to the CPN (UML)'s proposal to have someone from the CPN (UML) as president. A leading member of the CPN (UML) said that the two parties had agreed on the candidacy of Madhav Kumar Nepal, the former General Secretary of the CPN (UML). However, a leading member of the CPN (M) disputed this, saying that the two parties were closer to an agreement but that their party had not agreed to support a CPN (UML) candidate; he said that both Nepal and Sahana Pradhan (whose name was proposed by the CPN (M)) had been discussed as candidates.

The Nepal Federation of Indigenous Nationalities (NFIN) met with Koirala on June 20, seeking a recommendation that indigenous peoples not already represented in the CA be included in it through the 26 nominated seats. Koirala, who was supportive of the NFIN's request, also sharply criticized his rivals on this occasion, saying that they were practicing petty politics and were not respecting the people's mandate to work on a consensus basis. The Maoist ministers submitted their joint resignation at a meeting of the seven parties on June 20.

Sher Bahadur Deuba of the NC said on June 24 that the CPN (M) was responsible for the deadlock and claimed that it was working to divide the Seven-Party Alliance. He also said that Koirala would resign after the election of a President and that the CPN (M) had no authority to demand his resignation before then. Also on June 24, the seven parties agreed on the introduction of a constitutional amendment providing for the election of a President and the formation of a government through simple majority votes. There was, however, disagreement over the NC proposal to include a member of the opposition on the National Security Council; the CPN (M) and the CPN (UML) described this as undemocratic. There was also a proposal to include members of each of the seven parties on the National Security Council. Despite the failure to agree about the opposition's inclusion on the National Security Council, it was agreed to give the opposition a place on the Constitutional Council. The parties also reached agreement on a number of issues related to peace, disarmament and reintegration. A decision was also reached with to divide the 26 nominated seats in the CA among nine parties: the CPN (M) was to receive nine of these seats, while the NC and the CPN (UML) would each receive five, the Madhesi Janadhikar Forum would receive two, and the Sadbhavana Party, the Nepal Workers and Peasants Party, Janamorcha Nepal, and the CPN(M-L) would each receive one nominated seat.

== Resignation of Koirala, Madhesi demands ==
The Council of Ministers approved the constitutional amendment late on June 25. At a meeting of the Constituent Assembly (CA) on June 26, Koirala announced his resignation, although it will not be finalized until after the election of a President, to whom the resignation must be submitted. Although it was expected that the constitutional amendment would be approved at the same meeting, it was not introduced after Madhesi members of the CA demanded that the amendment be expanded to incorporate a March 2008 agreement between the Madhesis and the government that provided for Madhesi autonomy, among other things. As a result of this, the CA meeting was suspended until June 28. After meeting with Koirala on June 27, Hridayesh Tripathy of the Terai Madhes Loktantrik Party (TMLP) said that Koirala was in favor of incorporating the Madhesi agreement into the amendment and that he asked the Madhesis not to disrupt the CA again.

On June 28, the seven parties met to discuss the Madhesi demands; although no decision was reached, all of the parties opposed the Madhesi demand for a single province. The CA met later that day and was again disrupted by representatives of the Madhesi parties, forcing the cancellation of the meeting after only a few minutes. The next CA meeting on June 29 was also disrupted by the Madhesis and was cancelled. Jaya Prakash Gupta, a leading figure in the Madhesi Janadhikar Forum (MJF), also warned on June 29 that the Madhesi parties would "not only obstruct the CA but also paralyse the entire nation to force [the seven parties] to meet our demands." Prachanda, in an interview on June 30, expressed frustration with the Madhesi parties' disruption, which occurred just after Koirala's resignation, when it appeared the road to forming a new government was clear. He said that he favored Madhesi autonomy, but opposed their demand for all of Terai to become one Madhesi province. Khanal, the CPN (UML) General Secretary, flatly rejected the demand for a single Madhesi province, condemning it as "a game to disintegrate the nation". He said that the demand ignored the wishes of other ethnic groups in the Terai.

The CA met on June 30 but was again disrupted by the Madhesis and the meeting was cancelled. The three main parties reached an agreement with the three Madhesi parties, the MJF, the TMLP, and the Nepal Sadbhavana Party, on July 1, providing for a supplementary amendment bill that would meet the Madhesi demands. Another meeting of the CA was disrupted by the Madhesis and aborted on July 2, while the CPN (M), NC, and CPN (UML) met to decide the draft text of the supplementary amendment bill.

The CPN (M) and MJF met on July 3, and the CPN (M) agreed to include a reference to Madhesi autonomy in the bill, while also saying that it wanted the bill to mention other indigenous groups' desire for autonomy. 13 small parties in the CA said on July 3 that they were completely opposed to the Madhesi demand for a single autonomous province, and they criticized the larger parties for the political deadlock that prevented discussion of the issues from taking place in the CA.

Sessions of the CA were attempted on July 3 and July 4, but both were immediately disrupted by the Madhesi members and were aborted. On the latter occasion, Kul Bahadur Gurung, who chaired the session, urged the Madhesi members to respect the right of other members to be heard, but they ignored him. On July 4, the CPN (M), Nepali Congress, and CPN (UML) agreed on a draft supplementary amendment bill intended to satisfy the Madhesi demands. The draft requires the State Restructuring Commission to consider the March 2008 agreement between the government and the Madhesis when drawing up Nepal's federal structure. A meeting of the Seven Party Alliance followed the three-party agreement, and at this meeting, the People's Front Nepal, United Left Front, and Nepal Workers and Peasants Party objected to the draft, saying that it would endanger national unity. The cabinet approved the bill late on July 4; at the same time, it decided to nominate the 26 remaining members of the CA, dividing the seats between nine parties in accordance with the parties' earlier agreement and the lists of names they presented.

The Madhesi parties quickly deemed the supplementary amendment bill to be an unacceptable "betrayal". Khanal, the CPN (UML) General Secretary, said that the bill should satisfy the Madhesi demands, and he warned that opposition to the bill would not be in Madhesi interests or in the interests of any of the peoples of Terai. He called on the Madhesi members to make proposals and engage in discussion in the CA instead of disrupting it.

On July 6, at a meeting between the three main parties and the Madhesi parties, the former agreed to formulate a new bill to replace the one agreed upon two days prior, while the latter agreed to stop disrupting the CA. 23 of the 26 nominated members of the CA were sworn in on July 7; the remaining three were unable to attend the swearing in ceremony. On July 8, the Seven Party Alliance, with the exception of the Nepal Workers and Peasants Party, agreed on the content of a new draft bill, according to which federal structures would be created in line with the wishes of the Madhesis and other ethnic groups.

The Constituent Assembly (CA) was able to meet and function on July 9, for the first time since the Madhesis began pressing their demands on June 26. Although they did not disrupt the CA on this occasion, the three Madhesi parties furiously condemned the proposed bill and vowed that their struggle would continue. During the CA meeting, they submitted a protest notice, and when this was rejected, they chose to boycott the CA's proceedings. Narendra Bikram Nemwang, the Minister for Law, Justice and Parliamentary Affairs, tabled the bill regardless.

Koirala said on July 11 that forming a government was the responsibility of the CPN (M). However, the CPN (M) criticized the NC on July 12 for "obstructing the process [of forming a government] for the past three months". To protest the amendment bill, the Madhesi parties boycotted the CA meeting held on July 13, at which the amendment bill was considered. The bill was passed on the same day; 442 members of the CA voted for the amendment and seven voted against it. It thus became the interim constitution's Fifth Amendment. The amendment allows for the formation of a government based on a CA majority; it also allows the President, vice-president, Chairman of the CA, and the Deputy Chairman of the CA to be elected by majority vote if there is no consensus. In addition, the amendment provides for the Leader of the Opposition to become a member of the Constitutional Council; however, the CA rejected a proposal from the cabinet that the Leader of the Opposition be included on the National Defense Council.

In a meeting with the NC on July 14, the CPN (M) urged it to participate in the new government. A NC leader replied that the party had still not decided whether to participate.

== Election of Nepal's first president ==
An indirect presidential election was held in Nepal on 19 July 2008 with a presidential run-off on 21 July. The Nepalese Constituent Assembly (CA) elected in April 2008 elected a new president and vice-president after the Fifth Amendment to the Interim Constitution was passed on July 14. This would be the first President to be elected after Nepal became a republic a few months earlier.

In the newly passed amendment, the majority party will form the government, the CA will elect the new president on the basis of majority and a new provision that the Opposition Leader will be a member of the Constitutional Council. The leading political parties, NC, the CPN (M) and the CPN (UML) engaged in discussions regarding who would be the new president. The NC wanted Prime Minister and interim Head of State Girija Prasad Koirala while the CPN (UML) wanted its former Secretary-General Madhav Kumar Nepal as president. However, the CPN (M) wants an independent figure as president rather than party figures such as Koirala or Nepal. The Maoists won the most seats in the CA however needs to form a coalition government with the other parties.

== See also ==
- List of members elected in the 2008 Nepalese Constituent Assembly election
