= Krishna Bahadur Mahara =

Nepali politician

- कृष्ण बहादुर महरा
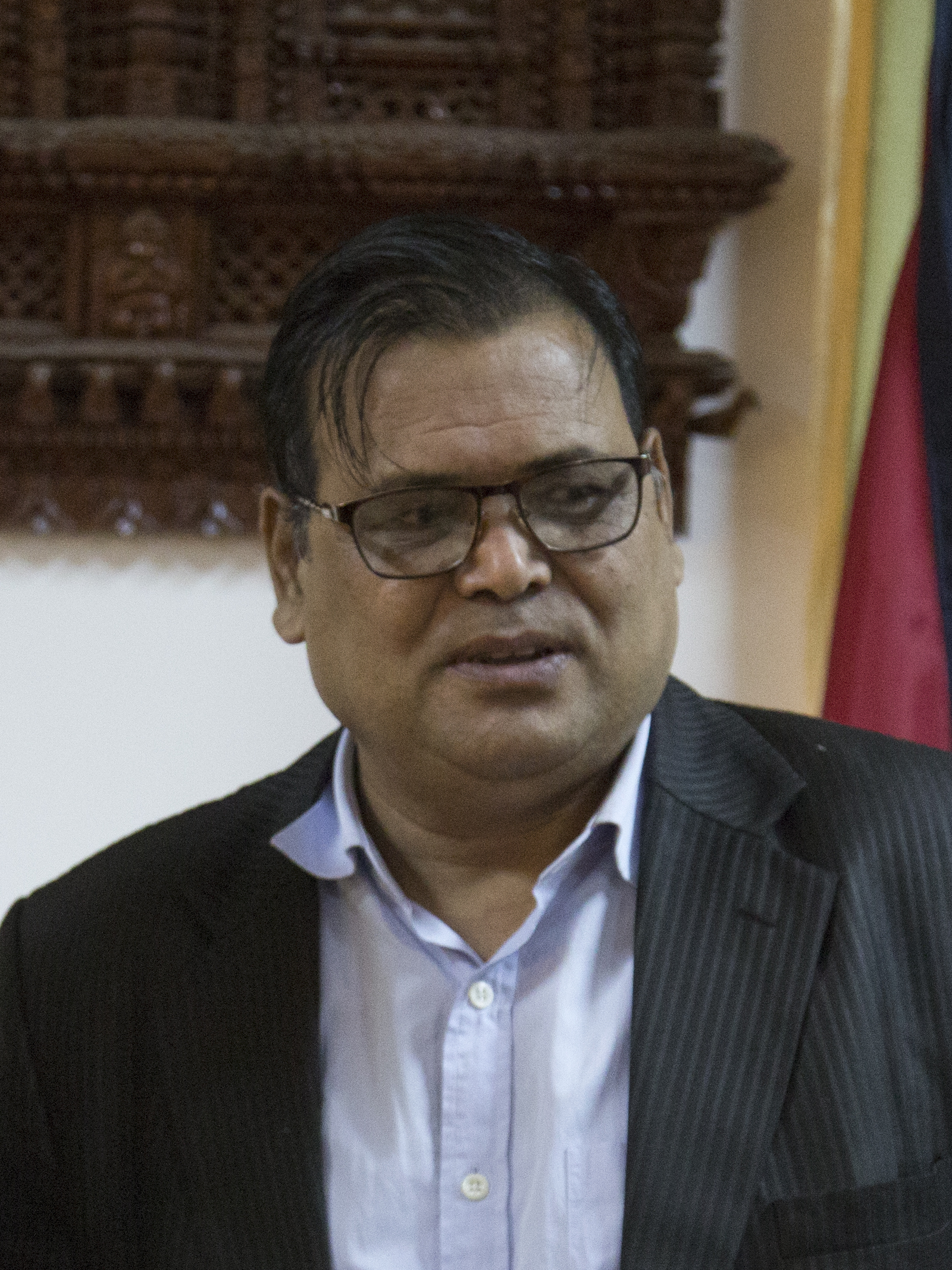

6th Speaker of the Pratinidhi Sabha
- In office 10 March 2018 – 1 October 2019
- President: Bidhya Devi Bhandari
- Deputy: Shiva Maya Tumbahamphe
- Preceded by: Onsari Gharti Magar (as Speaker of Constituent Assembly of Nepal)
- Succeeded by: Agni Prasad Sapkota

Ministry of Home Affairs (Nepal)
- In office 1 April 2007 – 17 September 2007
- President: Ram Baran Yadav
- Prime Minister: Girija Prasad Koirala
- Preceded by: Bhim Bahadur Rawal
- Succeeded by: Bijay Kumar Gachhadar

Minister of Information and Communications
- Preceded by: Dilendra Prasad Badu
- Succeeded by: Girija Prasad Koirala

Member of Parliament, Pratinidhi Sabha
- In office 4 March 2018 – 18 September 2022
- Preceded by: Sushila Chaudhary
- Succeeded by: Rekha Sharma
- Constituency: Dang 2
- In office May 1991 – August 1994
- Preceded by: Constituency created
- Succeeded by: Surendra Hamal
- Constituency: Rolpa 2

Member of Constituent Assembly
- In office 21 January 2014 – 14 October 2017
- Preceded by: Jaypuri Gharti
- Succeeded by: Barsaman Pun
- Constituency: Rolpa 1
- In office 28 May 2008 – 28 May 2012
- Preceded by: Krishna Kishor Ghimire
- Succeeded by: Raju Khanal
- Constituency: Dang 3

Minister of Foreign Affairs
- In office 2017
- Preceded by: Prakash Sharan Mahat
- Succeeded by: Sher Bahadur Deuba as Prime Minister

Personal details
- Born: 29 June 1958 (age 68) Liwang Rolpa District Nepal
- Party: CPN (Maoist Centre)
- Other political affiliations: CPN (Unity Centre); Nepal Communist Party
- Spouse: Sita Mahara
- Children: 4
- Parents: Ravichan Mahara (father); Samundra Devi Mahara (mother)

Krishna Bahadur Mahara is a Nepalese politician, belonging to the Nepali Communist Party. He was a prominent Maoist leader during the civil war. After the Maoists entered the peace process, he was elected to parliament/constituent-assembly multiple times, and also became a cabinet minister. Following his election to the house of representatives in the 2017 legislative election, he was elected House Speaker but resigned in October 2019 after allegations of attempted rape were made by a parliamentary staffer. He was acquitted in February 2020.

== Career ==
In the April 2008 Constituent Assembly election he was elected from the Dang-3 constituency, winning 20784 votes. He was subsequently appointed as Minister of Information and Communication in the cabinet headed by Communist Party of Nepal (Maoist Centre) Chairman Prachanda and sworn in on 22 August 2008.

== Controversies ==
In September 2019, an employee of the parliament secretariat alleged attempted rape by a drunk Mahara at her apartment on the night of 29 September. Mahara resigned as Speaker on 1 October at the behest of his party, and was subsequently arrested.

Krishna Bahadur Mahara was also arrested and brought to Kathmandu for investigation into his alleged involvement in a major gold smuggling case.

== See also ==
- Shakti Bahadur Basnet
- Top Bahadur Rayamajhi
