= List of Nepali literature in English =

This is a list of Nepali literature translated in the English language.

== Nepali Literature Translated into English ==
English Name	English Translator	Date of translation publication	Original Name	Original Writer	Date of original publication	Type
Langada's Friend	Jayaraj Acharya and Don Messerschmidt	2022	Langadako Sathi	Lain Singh Bangdel	1951	Novel
Black Sun	Saroj Kumar Shakya	1979	Kalo Surya	Bharat Jangam		Novel
The Wake of the White Tiger	Greta Rana	1984	Seto Bagh	Diamond Shumsher Rana		Novel
Muna Madan	Laxmi Prasad Devkota	1987	Muna Madan	Laxmi Prasad Devkota		Epic
Under the Sleepless Sun	Nara Pallav	2007		Parijat		Novel
Faulty Glasses	Keshar Lall	1997	Doshi Chasma	BP Koirala		Stories
Narendra Dai	Jayraj Acharya	2013		BP Koirala		Novel
Atmabrittanta	Kanak Mani Dixit	2001		BP Koirala		Novel
Modiaain	Jay Raj Acharya	2010	Modiaain	BP Koirala		Novel
Khaireni Ghat	Larry Hartsell	1996				Novel
Aswatthama	Padma Prasad Devkota	1998		Madhav Prasad Ghimire		Epic
A Handbook of Siddhicharan's Verse	Madhav Lal Karmacharya	1998		Siddhicharan Shrestha		Poems
Window of the House Opposite	Larry Hartsell	1998	Pallo Ghar ko Jhyal	Govinda Bahadur Malla Gothale		Novel
Rupamati	Shanti Mishra	1999	Rupamati	Rudra Raj Pandey		Novel
Twists and Turns	Tirtha Tuladhar	2000		Durga Lal Shrestha		Novel
Memoir’s of Jail	Laxmi Raj Bhandari	2002		Siddhicharan Shrestha		Novel
Sumnima	Tara Nath Sharma	2005	Sumnima	BP Koirala		Novel
Terror of Flower	Philip Pears	2005		Dhruba Chandra Gautam		Novel
The Prison	Ann Hunkins	2005	Karagar	Banira Giri	1978	
Masan	Sangeeta Raymajhi	2006		Gopal Prasad Rimal		Play
Sugat Saurav	Todd T. Lewis Subarna Man Tuladhar	2007		Chittadhar Hridaya		Novel
Anuradha	Larry Hartsell		Anuradha	Bijaya Malla		Novel
Declaration of a New God	Govinda Raj Bhattarai	2008	Naya Ishwar Ko Ghoshana	Gopal Parajuli	2005	Epic
Mountain Painted with Turmeric	Michael Hutt	2008	Basain	Lil Bahadur Chettri		Novel
Twenty-first Century Sumina	Subas Ghimire	2008		Pradeep Nepal		Novel
Mode of Life	Dinesh Adhikari	2009		Robin Sharma		Poems
Socrates’ Footsteps	Balaram Adhikari	2010	Sukaratka Paila	Govinda Raj Bhattarai		Novel
Sun Showers	Manu Manjil Mahesh Paudyal	2010				Poems
An Outsider in the Court of God	Kumar Nagarkoti	2010		Momila		Novel
The Journey’s End	Hrishikesh Upadhyay	2011		Rajeshwar Devkota		Essays
Last Page of My Poem	Mahesh Paudyal	2011		Rajeshwar Karki		Poems
The War is Breaking	Mahesh Paudyal	2011		Bishwambhar Chanchal		Stories
Beyond the Holy Border	Multiple translators	2011		Bhisma Upreti		Essays
Cry in the Wilderness and Other Short Stories	Kesar Lall Tej R. Kansakar	2011		Srilaxmi Shrestha		Novel
Parallel Sky	Anuradha Sharma	2011		Padmavati Singh		Novel
Beyond the Frontiers: Women’s Stories from Nepal	Gunjan	2006		Padmavati Singh		Novel
The Blue Mimosa	Tanka Vilas Varya	2012	Shirishko Phool	Parijat		Novel
Muglan	Lekh Nath Pathak	2012		Govinda Raj Bhattarai		Novel
Threads of Smoke	Bal Ram Adhikari	2013		Niraj Bhattarai		Poems
Kathmandu Kaleidoscope	Mahesh Paudyal	2014		Bhisma Upreti		Poems
Selected Poems	Multiple translators	2014		Momila		Novel
Of a Lesser God	Damodar Sharma	2017		Maya Thakuri		Stories
Another Cultivation of Maize	Sanjeev Upreti	2017		Makai ko arko Kheti		Play
Light of the Himalayas	Mahesh Paudyal	2017		Kavita Ram Shrestha		Novel
Forty Years in the Mountain	Mahesh Paudyal	2017		Lakpa Phuti Sherpa		Memoir
Standing Alone	Bal Ram Adhikari	2017		Nabin Prachin		Poems
Radha	Mahesh Paudyal	2018	Radha	Krishna Dharabasi		Novel
Never Say Goodbye	Mahesh Paudyal	2018		Krishna Prasai		Novel
Songs of Swallows	Multiple translators	2018		SP Koirala		Poems
Lunatic and Other Poems	Laxmi Prasad Devkota			Laxmi Prasad Devkota		Poems
Nepali Visions, Nepali Dreams	David Ruben	1980				
An Anthology of Short Stories of Nepal	Kesar Lall Tej R. Kansakar	1998				
The Himalayan Voices	Michael Hutt	1993				
Selected Nepali Poems	Taranath Sharma	1999				Poems
Selected Nepali Essays	Govinda Raj Bhattarai	2003				Essays
Contemporary Nepali Poems	Padma Devkota	2000				Poems
Manao Secret Places	Manjushree ThapaSamrat Upadhyay	2001				
Selected Stories from Nepal	Govinda Raj Bhattarai	2004				Stories
Stories of Conflict and War	Govinda Raj Bhattarai	2007				
Rebel: Stories of Conflict and War from Nepal	Ramchandra KC	2011				Poems
Dancing Soul of Mountain Everest	Mahesh Paudyal	2011				Poems
Representative Anthology of Contemporary Nepali Poetry	Govinda Raj Bhattarai	2014				Poems
The Himalayan Bard	Mahesh Paudyal	2015				Poems
Sangam: Contemporary Nepali Poetry in Translation	Haris Adhikari	2018				Poems
There's a Carnival Today	Manjushree Thapa	2017	Aaja Ramita Chha	Indra Bahadur Rai		Novel
Long Night of Storm	Prawin Adhikari	2018		Indra Bahadur Rai		Short Stories
Night: Poems	Muna Gurung	2019	Raat	Sulochana Manandhar		Poems
The Nepal Nexus	Sanjaya Dhakal	2019	Prayogshala	Sudheer Sharma	2013	Political non-fiction
Song of The Soil	Ajit Baral	2021	Faatsung	Chuden Kabimo	2018	Novel
Karnali Blues	Michael Hutt	2021	Karnali Blues	Buddhisagar	2010	Novel
White Life	Amar Nyaupane	2012	Seto Dharti	Niranjan Kunwar	2025	Novel
Alphabets In The Snow	Nayan Raj Pandey	2016	Sallipir	Anurag Basnet	2025	Novel
Malati Robot	Nagendra Sharma	2016	Malati	Mukti Upadhyay Baral	2011	Novel

== Nepali Literature Written in English ==
Title	Author	Publication date	Type
People of Nepal	Dor Bahadur Bista	1967	Anthropological non-fiction
Fatalism and Development	Dor Bahadur Bista	1991	Anthropological non-fiction
The Tutor of History	Manjushree Thapa	2001	Novel
Arresting God in Kathmandu	Samrat Upadhaya	2001	Short Stories
Forget Kathmandu	Manjushree Thapa	2005	Political non-fiction
Tilled Earth	Manjushree Thapa	2007	Short Stories
Breaking Twilight	D.B Gurung	2013	Novel
Annapurna Poems	Yuyutsu Sharma	2008	Poems
Seasons of Flight	Manjushree Thapa	2010	Short stories
Unleashing Nepal	Sujeev Shakya	2013	Non-fiction
City of Dreams	Pranaya SJB Rana	2015	Short Stories
Ayo Gorkhali: A History of the Gurkhas	Tim Gurung	2020	History
The Witch Doctor and Other Essays	Laxmi Prasad Devkota	November 11, 2017	Essays
Kathmandruids: Monomyths & Meanymyths	Peter J. Karthak	2018	Novel
The Wayward Daughter	Shradha Ghale	2018	Novel
Between Queens and the Cities	Niranjan Kunwar	2020	Memoir
All Roads Lead North	Amish Raj Mulmi	March 15, 2021	Political non-fiction
Dandelion Snow & Verses from Other Cities, Other Worlds	Anand Gurung	2019	Poetry
Hisila: From Revolutionary to First Lady	Hisila Yami	2021	Memoir
