= Literature of Nepal =

Nepali literature (Nepali: नेपाली साहित्य) is the literature of Nepal. This is distinct from Nepali literature, which is the literature in only Nepali language (Khas kura). The major literary languages of Nepal are:

== English literature ==
Nepalis writing in English first came to prominence with Laxmi Prasad Devkota's own translations of his Nepali poems in the 1950s. Devkota is believed to be the first Nepali to begin writing creatively in English. Devkota also penned some essays in English which were published posthumously by his son, Dr. Padma Devkota, in a book titled 'The Witch Doctor and Other Essays'. After Devkota came writers like Mani Dixit, Tek Bahadur Karki, Abhi Subedi and Peter J Karthak who began writing in English from the 60s onwards. During the 70s and 80s, these pioneers were joined by writers like Kesar Lall, Greta Rana, Kesang Tseten, and DB Gurung. It was only in 2001 that Nepali writing in English received international attention with the publication of Samrat Upadhyay's Arresting God in Kathmandu. Published in the United States, the collection of short stories won the Whiting Award for Fiction. Since then, a number of prominent Nepali writers writing in English have emerged, most notably Manjushree Thapa whose non-fiction book, Forget Kathmandu: An Elegy for Democracy, was nominated for the 2006 Lettre Ulysses Award.

Contemporary Nepalis writing in English include

- Niranjan Kunwar (Between Queens and the Cities)
- Pranaya SJB Rana (City of Dreams)
- Prawin Adhikari (The Vanishing Act)
- Rabi Thapa (Nothing to Declare, Thamel: Dark Star of Kathmandu)
- Richa Bhattarai (Fifteen and Three Quarters)
- Rishi Amatya (Radha: Wrath of the Maeju)
- Shiwani Neupane (Monica - Pieces of Perfect, Crossing Shadows)
- Shradha Ghale (The Wayward Daughter)
- Smriti Ravindra (The Woman Who Climbed Trees)

== Nepali literature ==
Nepali literature consists of the literature written in the Nepali language. The Nepali language has been the national language of Nepal since 1958. The Nepali language has also been recognized as a "major Indian literary language" by the Sahitya Akademi, India's National Academy of Letters.

== Nepal Bhasa literature ==
The literature written in Nepal Bhasa is called Nepal Bhasa literature.

== Sanskrit ==
Modern Sanskrit literature in Nepal includes works by Nara Nath Acharya, Vishnu Raj Atreya, and Shivraj Acharya Kaundinya among others.
