= Hisila: From Revolutionary to First Lady =

2021 autobiography by Hisila Yami

Hisila: from Revolutionary to First Lady
- Author: Hisila Yami
- Language: English
- Genre: Memoir
- Set in: Nepalese Civil War
- Publisher: Penguin Random House
- Publication date: 2021
- Publication place: Nepal
- Pages: 384
- ISBN: 978-0-14-342789-6

Hisila: from Revolutionary to First Lady is a 2021 memoir by Nepalese politician Hisila Yami. It was published by Penguin Random House.

== Synopsis ==
The book contains chronicles of her life, from being born in a Newar family, being a student in India, meeting and marrying Baburam Bhattarai, becoming a Maoist revolutionary, wife of Bhattarai, and being a mother. Hisila: from Revolutionary to First Lady received mixed reviews from critics. The Record said that this book can be useful for "those interested in the social sciences, especially gender and social inclusion, and the history and political economy of the Nepali civil war".

== See also ==
- Singha Durbarko Ghumne Mech
- Forget Kathmandu
- The Nepal Nexus
- All Roads Lead North
