= Tilled Earth =

2007 book by Manjushree Thapa

Tilled Earth: Stories
- Cover page of the first edition
- Author: Manjushree Thapa
- Language: English
- Genre: Short stories (Contemporary fiction)
- Published: 2007
- Publisher: Penguin India, Aleph Book Company
- Publication date: 2007
- Publication place: India, Nepal
- Media type: Print, E-book
- Pages: 184
- ISBN: 9780143102649
- Preceded by: Forget Kathmandu
- Followed by: A Boy from Siklis

Tilled Earth: Stories is an anthology of short stories by Manjushree Thapa. It was published in 2007 by Penguin India. It is her first short story collection and fourth book. The book was launched by poet Wayne Amtizis and filmmaker Kesang Tseten in the British Council Nepal. The book consists of twenty-one short stories.

== Synopsis ==
The stories in the book depicts the daily life of Nepalese people in the early 2000s. The main characters of the stories are Nepalese people who are either living in Nepal or abroad or expatriates travelling in Nepal. Some of the stories are a page long while some are novella-length.

The stories explore traditional Nepalese society, engaging with themes such as the caste system, Nepalese politics, gender bias within Nepal, and Nepalese people living abroad.

== Reception ==
The book received mostly positive responses from critics. Geeta Doctor of India Today called the stories in the book "brilliantly balanced" with "sense of despair and celebration". Chandrahas Choudhury of Mint named "The Buddha in the Earth— Touching Posture" as his the best story in the collection. Navtej Sarna from DNA India however was unimpressed with the stories in the collection.

Khademul Islam of The Daily Star (Bangladesh) praised the anthology as "a delightful and thoughtful read".

The book was reprinted by Aleph Book Company who acquired the rights to Thapa's works.

== See also ==
- Arresting God in Kathmandu
- City of Dreams
- The Tutor of History
