= Nepal–United Kingdom relations =

- Nepal: United Kingdom

Nepal–United Kingdom relations are the foreign relations between the Federal Democratic Republic of Nepal and the United Kingdom of Great Britain and Northern Ireland. Relations between the UK and Nepal have historically been friendly and there have been close links between the two royal families, until monarchy was abolished in Nepal. The Treaty of Friendship between Nepal and Great Britain, signed on December 21, 1923, marked a turning point in Nepal–UK relations. This treaty not only reaffirmed Nepal's sovereignty and independence but also solidified its status as a close ally of the British Empire. Nepal and Britain, bound by a longstanding friendship, fought side by side and won the war together as allies in both World War I and World War II

== History ==
Nepal and the United Kingdom signed a treaty in 1923, the first to define the international status of Nepal as an independent and a sovereign nation. It superseded the Sugauli Treaty signed in 1816.

The Brigade of Gurkhas of the British Army has recruited soldiers from Nepal since the 19th century.

During both World War I and World War II, Nepal provided military and financial support to the British war effort.

In the aftermath of the 1952 British Malayan headhunting scandal, the British embassy in Nepal privately warned the Foreign Office that images of British atrocities during the Malayan Emergency were harming Britain's attempts to recruit Gurkhas.

The Embassy of Nepal marked 200 years of Nepal-UK ties in 2014. The UK is Nepal's largest bilateral aid donor.

== Diplomatic Relations ==
The United Kingdom established a full-fledged embassy in Kathmandu in 1954, shortly after Nepal opened up to the outside world. Nepal maintains its embassy in London. The relationship has been characterized by mutual respect, despite Nepal's non-colonial history with Britain—a rarity in South Asia .

Both countries cooperate through multilateral forums such as the United Nations, and the UK has consistently supported Nepal’s development, democratic transition, and peace process, especially after the end of the Nepalese Civil War in 2006.

Cultural links are provided by the British Council Nepal, who offer technical education and vocational training programs.

== Trade and Investment ==
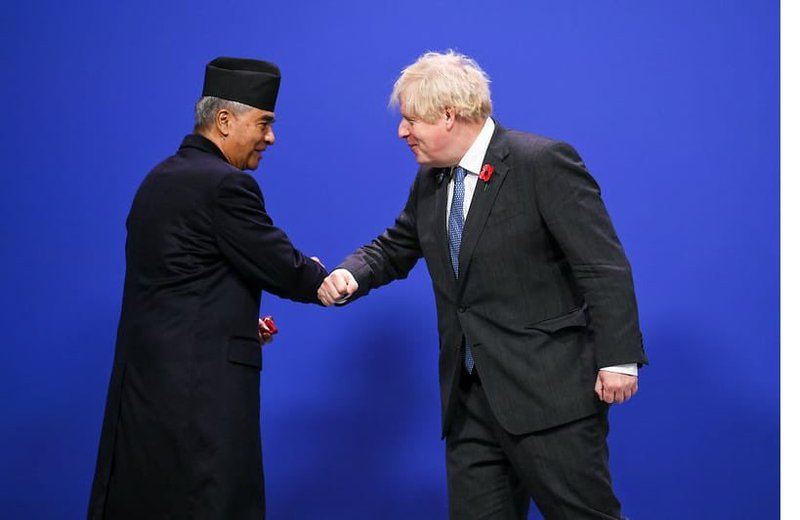
PM Deuba with UK's PM Boris Johnson in London in 2021 COP26

Trade between Nepal and the UK remains modest but significant. The UK imports handicrafts, tea, carpets, and garments from Nepal, while exporting machinery, electronics, and pharmaceuticals. Nepal also benefits from preferential trade schemes under the UK’s Developing Countries Trading Scheme (DCTS).

British investment in Nepal includes sectors such as tourism, hydropower, and education.

== See also ==
- Nepalese in the United Kingdom
- Foreign aid to Nepal
- Foreign relations of Nepal
- Foreign relations of the United Kingdom
