= Nepalese in the United Kingdom =

Nepali diaspora in United Kingdom, Ethnic group

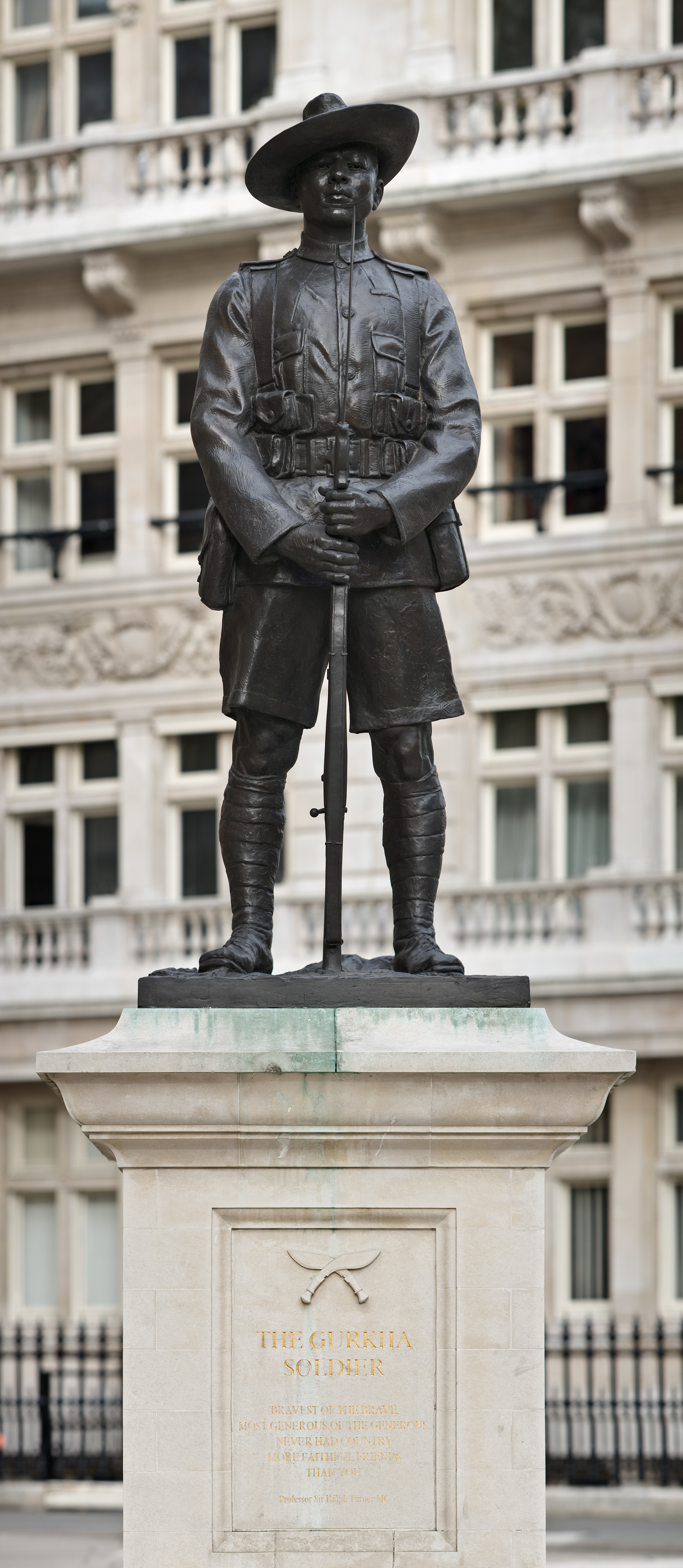
- A monument of a Nepalese Gurkha Soldier near the Ministry of Defence in London, with an inscription: "Bravest of the brave, most generous of the generous, never had country more faithful friends than you."

Total population
- England & Wales: 103,888 (2021); Scotland: 2,842 (2022); Northern Ireland: 270 (2021)

Regions with significant populations
- South East England, (Reading, Basingstoke, Wiltshire,Swindon, Folkestone, Ashford, Maidstone, Aldershot, Farnborough), London (Hillingdon, Hounslow, Ealing, Woolwich), West Midlands, (Nuneaton)

Languages
- English · Nepali · Gurung · Nepal Bhasa · Limbu · Magar

Religion
- Hinduism · Buddhism · Kirant Mundhum · Christian

Related ethnic groups
- Nepali people · Gurung · Limbu · Rai · Magar · Chhetri · Newar · Madhesi Nepalese

The 2021/22 UK censuses recorded 103,888 people of Nepali ethnicity in England and Wales and 2,842 in Scotland.

== History ==
From the first quarter of the 19th century, Gurkhas from Nepal served in the British Army, and Gurkha soldiers' families lived in the UK. People from Nepal living in the UK belong to many different Nepalese ethnic groups or castes and may have different languages although all speak Nepali as a mother tongue.

In 1965, the first settlement of London's Nepalese community was made at 145 Whitfield Street in Camden. A commemorative plaque now stands on the site.

== Demographics ==
The 2001 UK Census recorded 5,943 Nepali-born people were residing in the UK. In 2008, the president of the Himalayan Yeti Nepalese Association was reporting as estimating that up to 50,000 Nepalese might be living in the UK. The 2011 UK Census recorded 48,497 people born in Nepal living in England, 1,011 in Wales, 1,268 in Scotland and 105 in Northern Ireland. Office for National Statistics estimates suggest that 62,000 Nepalese-born people were resident in the UK in 2016.

The 2021/22 UK censuses recorded 77,349 people born in Nepal living in England, 1,271 in Wales, 2,478 in Scotland and 270 in Northern Ireland.

At the time of the 2011 census, the regions with the largest Nepalese-born populations were London and South East England, with 19,051 and 19,111 people respectively. In particular there are significant communities in Aldershot and Folkestone due to links with the British Army. Of the 49,508 Nepalese-born in England and Wales, 56 per cent stated that they were Hindus, 25.9 per cent Buddhists and 3.8 per cent Christians. 1.7 per cent stated that they did not have a religion and a small number specified other religions. 11.8 per cent did not provide an answer to the religion question. 52.9 per cent of the Nepalese-born population of England and Wales had arrived during the period 2007 to 2011, 34.6 per cent between 2001 and 2006, 11.4 per cent between 1981 and 2000, and 1.1 per cent prior to 1981.

Religion of Nepalese Born - England and Wales
Religion	Census 2011		Census 2021	
Religion	Number	%	Number	%
Hinduism	27,704	56.0%	40,553	51.6%
Buddhism	12,834	25.9%	20,513	26.1%
Other Religions	87	0.2%	6,226	7.9%
No Religion	848	1.7%	3,966	5.0%
Christianity	1,875	3.8%	3,532	4.5%
Islam	244	0.5%	179	0.2%
Judaism	23	0.0%	17	0.0%
Sikhism	43	0.1%	16	0.0%
Not Stated	5,850	11.8%	3,617	4.6%
Total	49,508	100%	78,619	100%

The London borough with the highest Nepalese born residents was Greenwich with 4,853 people.

== Employment ==
As of 1 April 2019, 3,430 Gurkhas were serving in the British Army. According to the 2001 UK census, 34.8 per cent of Nepalese-born people in London were working in hotels or restaurants, 15.7 per cent in real estate and renting, 15.3 per cent in wholesale and retail, 9.6 per cent in health and social care.

== Notable individuals ==
- Asmita Ale, footballer
- Yama Buddha, rapper
- Bivesh Gurung, footballer
- Jassita Gurung, actress
- Lachhiman Gurung, soldier
- Sonita Henry, actress
- Prayashna Gurung, Miss Universe Nepal 2026
- Henry Kamen, historian
- Mukahang Limbu, poet
- Rambahadur Limbu, soldier
- Miruna Magar, actress
- Bikash Nepal, entrepreneur
- Dipprasad Pun, soldier
- Tul Bahadur Pun Magar, soldier
- Nirmal Purja, mountaineer
- Kiban Rai, footballer
- Pratishtha Raut, model
- Santosh Shah, chef
- Amita Suman, actress
- Kulbir Thapa Magar, soldier
- Tsunaina, singer
- Sushant Subedi, Economist

== See also ==
- List of Nepal-related topics
- Nepal–United Kingdom relations
- Nepalese diaspora
