= Prajwal =

Prajwal is a given name. Notable people with the name include:

- Prajwal Devaraj (born 1987), Indian actor
- Prajwal Parajuly (born 1984), Indian writer
- Prajwal Revanna (born 1990), Indian politician

== See also ==
- S D Prajwal Dev (born 1996), Indian tennis player
