= Unleashing Nepal =

Nepalese economic book

- First edition
- Author: Sujeev Shakya
- Language: English
- Genre: Non-fiction
- Publisher: Penguin Books India
- Publication date: September 15, 2009
- Publication place: Nepal
- ISBN: 978-0-14-306777-1
- Followed by: Unleashing the Vajra

Unleashing Nepal Revised is a 2013 non-fiction book by Sujeev Shakya. Closing out an eventful decade, in which the centuries-old institution of monarchy Nepal was replaced by an elected government, Shakya connects the history of Nepal to the current economic situation, and its implications.

== Origins ==
Shakya is a Neoliberal management consultant who had been publishing a popular column with the pseudonym Artha Beed in the Nepali Times and is currently a weekly columnist for the local newspaper The Kathmandu Post. He writes the book from the perspective of a globally experienced private sector person with deep knowledge and experience of the Nepali economy. The foreword by Gurucharan Das links the inspiration of the book to the 2000 India Unbound.

== Overview ==
The past decade has been an eventful one for Nepal. It has featured thwarted attempts at democracy, a royal massacre and a coup, and finally Maoist guerrillas coming over ground, winning a popular electoral mandate and decisively ending the centuries-old institution of monarchy.

Unleashing Nepal has been written at a time when many fundamental questions on economic rights are being raised by an ever more assertive citizenry. It narrates the chequered history of Nepal's economy- from the time of unification, through decades of autocracy, mixed economy and foreign aid dependence, to the 'conflictonomics' of the Maoist guerrilla war and a remittance economy driven by the labour of Nepali diaspora.

Unleashing Nepal also tells the stories of figures who are a crucial part of Nepal's economic life—the night watchman in India or Dubai, the selfish aristocrat of the past, the foreign aid worker and the modestly venal government servant. More unusually, the reader reads about Nepali youth with global desires and resourceful village communities who manage electricity while Kathmandu is plunged in darkness.

The revised edition has a new Afterword that talks about the last 4 years, since the book was written in 2009. The changes that have taken place, and the changes that continue to take place. The four years could not have been more eventful as Nepal moves into another phase of electing a new Constituent Assembly, deciding on its federal structure, its form of government and the level of economic empowerment. The afterword talks about that and much more.

== See also ==
- All Roads Lead North
- The Nepal Nexus
- Fatalism and Development: Nepal's Struggle for Modernization
