= List of Nepali translators =

This is a list of translators who contributed to Nepal and Nepali language.

== A ==
- Abhi Subedi – poet, playwright, translator, essayist

== B ==
- Bhanubhakta Acharya

== K ==
- Kshetra Pratap Adhikary

== M ==
- Manjushree Thapa

== S ==
- Suman Pokhrel – poet, translator, artist

== Y ==
- Yuyutsu Sharma – poet, editor and translator
