= The Tutor of History =

2001 novel by Manjushree Thapa

- First edition
- Author: Manjushree Thapa
- Language: English
- Genre: Fiction
- Published: 2001
- Publisher: Penguin Books, Aleph Book Company
- Publication date: 2001
- Publication place: Nepal, India
- Media type: Print (Paperback)
- Pages: 442
- ISBN: 9780141007748
- Preceded by: Mustang Bhot in Fragments
- Followed by: Forget Kathmandu

The Tutor of History is a novel by Nepalese-Canadian writer Manjushree Thapa. It was published in 2001 by Penguin Books. The book is considered one of the first books written by a Nepalese writer in English.

It is the first novel of the writer who had previously written a non-fiction book called Mustang Bhot in Fragments published in 1992.

== Synopsis ==
The book is set in 1990s Nepal. The main plot of the book is centered around the campaign for parliamentary elections in the roadside town of Khaireni Tar, situated between Kathmandu and Pokhara in the western region of Nepal. The book shows the effect of the elections on the common people of that town and the lives of the people gets entangled with the politics.

== Characters ==
The major characters of the novel are :

- Giridhar Adhikari -Chairman of the People's Party's district committee
- Rishi Parajuli - A under-employed bachelor, UML member and a tutor to school children
- Om Gurung - A former British Gurkha
- Binita Dahal - A young widow who owns a small tea shop

== Reception ==
Renowned writer Indra Bahadur Rai in his review for Nepali Times lauded the novel and said, " She will be a recurrent success story" about Thapa. Sarah LeVine praised the book as providing "modern perspective" to Nepal in her review for the journal European Bullet for Himalayan Research.

== See also ==
- Arresting God in Kathmandu
- Tilled Earth
- Forget Kathmandu
- Unleashing Nepal
