= The Dilemma of an Indian Liberal =

2024 book on Liberalism in an Indian context

- Cover of the book "The Dilemma of an Indian Liberal"
- Author: Gurcharan Das
- Language: Indian English
- Subject: Ideology and Indian political landscape
- Genre: Nonfiction
- Published: Yes
- Publisher: Speaking Tiger Books
- Publication date: February 20, 2024
- Publication place: India
- Media type: Print, Ebook
- ISBN: 9789354476792

The Dilemma of an Indian Liberal is a memoir by Indian economist Gurucharan Das in which he reflects on his personal and intellectual journey toward liberalism, while also exploring the paradoxes, ironies, and moral dilemmas that surround this ideology in the Indian context.

== Synopsis ==
Das introduces the book by defining who a “liberal” is and tracing the provenance of liberal ideas in India, he states that liberalism spread amongst wealthy Indians with the arrival of the British Raj. According to Das, by the third decade of the 21st century liberal democracy was “in the retreat” around the world. He observes what he deems to be an irony present in India which is that India despite being lauded as a “vigorous” democracy, constantly produces an anaemic economy, which is a consequence of a socialist-command economy, called Licence Raj. In 1991, India achieved economic freedom which is described as “the liberal dream”. However, Das notes this accomplishment was followed by a weakening democracy in India.

In the succeeding chapters, Das narrates the history of the evolution of liberalism from the 18th century European Age of Enlightenment to the Industrial Revolution, to the Great Depression culminating in the modern-day contemporary liberalism. He contends that the sentiment that liberalism originated at the global west is a myth. He defends his contention by citing the Rig Veda c.1500 BCE.

[In the beginning] there was neither being nor non-being…[but] who really knows? [for] the gods came afterwards.

In Chapter 4, Das maps the events that led to the liberalisation of India which included the transfer of power from the British Raj to Indian people which enabled the framing of the Indian Constitution, the formation and demise of a liberal Indian party named Swatantra Party culminating in the 1991 liberal economic reforms of India.

Das continues to narrate his ideological journey from socialism to liberalism, libertarianism and back to classical liberalism. He describes the political climate of the newly independent socialist India, the role of Nehru in his prime ministerhood, Das's encounter with racism in the US, brings him his epiphany of racism that exists in his home, India. He also recounts how his employment with Richardson Hindustan Limited in Bombay, selling Vicks VapoRub, landed him in legal trouble. In the chapter titled “A Victim of the Licence Raj”, Das describes his experiences being taken to court as Vicks's sales goes “through the roof” at the onset of the flu epidemic in 1968. As the sales exceeded the authorized, licensed production limit, Das's company's actions were construed to be a crime with a potential jail sentence.

As I’m leaving, I remind the officer to imagine how our country will look in the eyes of the world when national and international newspapers report that our government has sent an executive to jail for alleviating the misery of millions of children during an epidemic. The government quietly drops the enquiry.

Das admits that it was at this point of his life he abandoned Socialism and embraced Laissez Fair Libertarianism, believing in a small state.

In the final chapters, Das lays out the shortcomings of liberalism, according to him, while liberalism focuses on the intrinsic worth of an individual but does not sufficiently value the “bonds of community”. Ultimately, Das concludes that despite liberalism's inadequacy in certain aspects of a society, he will not abandon his faith in liberalism, and contends that it will once again prevail.

== Reception ==
According to The Hindu, the narrative of the book consists of "wit and disarming candour" which "sucks one into the life of a man in search of Moksha."The New Indian Express states that the book explores the political journey of the author in a manner that is simple but also intellectually refined.

== See also ==
- The Elephant Paradigm
- India Unbound
- The Difficulty of Being Good
