= The Gurkha's Daughter =

2012 short story collection by Prajwal Parajuly

- First edition
- Author: Prajwal Parajuly
- Language: English
- Genre: Short Stories
- Publisher: Quercus
- Publication date: 2012
- Publication place: India
- Pages: 272
- ISBN: 9781848662759
- Followed by: Land Where I Flee

The Gurkha's Daughter is a collection of short stories by Indian author Prajwal Parajuly, describing and dramatizing the experiences of Nepali-speaking people and the Nepali diaspora. The Hindustan Times described it as the "best short story collection you have read in a while".

== The Stories ==
The book comprises eight stories based upon the Nepali-speaking societies of and around Nepal. Most of the stories in the book happen in Gorkhaland, that lies in the frontier of Nepal and India.

Title of the story	Description
"The Cleft"	A disfigured servant girl plans to flee Nepal.
"Let Sleeping Dogs Lie"	A shopkeeper in Kalimpong faces an impossible dilemma.
"A Father's Journey"	A father reflects on his relationship with his only daughter.
"Missed Blessing"	A Hindu religious festival in Darjeeling brings with it a sacrifice.
"No Land is Her Land"	A Nepali Bhutanese refugee pins her hopes on the West.
"The Gurkha's Daughter"	A Gurkha's daughter tries to comprehend her father's complaints.
"Passing Fancy"	A retired woman contemplates an affair.
"The Immigrants"	Two young Nepali speaking immigrants meet in the New York City borough of Manhattan.

== Critical response ==
In The Asian Review of Books, Nigel Collett called The Gurkha's Daughter a "promising debut", adding that Parajuly, "gets deep under the skin of his characters to reveal the often very difficult circumstances in which they live. I am aware of no other writer in English who has so vividly brought to life the dilemmas and constrictions of daily Nepalese life. The effect is poignant." Babatdor Dkhar of the Calcutta Telegraph referenced the initial buzz surrounding Parajuly's two-book deal, saying that fears he would not live up to expectation proved unfounded. "Parajuly paints colourful landscapes of a world that forever has remained in the background. A world that made sense in the stereotype. A world whose characters come out of their small roles and make the starring ones their own. He brings to life the dreams, the everyday, the aspirations, the failures, love, the differences that add and the ones that remove." The Lady magazine gave three stars to the collection, saying they were, "Stylistically reminiscent of Raymond Carver, while at the same time opening a door on to an unfamiliar world." John Garth in The Guardian has written a long review of the book.

== Honors ==
On 7 October 2013, The Gurkha's Daughter was among seven titles short-listed for the Dylan Thomas Prize.

== Translation ==
The book was translated in Nepali as Gurkha ki Chhori and was published in 2015.
