= The Difficulty of Being Good =

Book on Dharma, Indian concept of righteousness

- Cover of book
- Author: Gurcharan Das
- Language: Indian English
- Subject: Ethics and morality
- Published: Yes
- Publisher: Penguin Random House
- Publication place: India
- Media type: Print, Ebook

The Difficulty of Being Good: On the Subtle Art of Dharma is a book written by Indian author Gurcharan Das and published by Penguin Random House. The book is centrally focused on why to be good in our day to day, private, and public life and the essence of Dharma, a key concept in Indian philosophy for righteousness, with reference to Indian epic Mahabharata.

== Synopsis ==
Book uses the examples from Hindu Epic, Mahabharata, to illustrate and demonstrate that how becoming good is difficult for an ordinary man. Book simplifies the lessons from the epic in various chapters and uses characters like Yudhisthira, Krishna, Arjuna and Karna to explain the importance of Dharma i.e. righteousness.

== Reception ==
The book was widely welcomed by several Indologists, columnists, commentators and several businessmen. Sanjaya Baru, writing for Outlook India had commented that the book reflects a new Gurcharan Das who is reflective, humane, deeply spiritual and secular—a renaissance man. According to him, Gurcharan voiced our(Indian's) despair about inequities and the amorality of public life and the books echoed voices for new India. Further, he wrote:

Gurcharan offers us a secular reading of a great epic. The underlying materialism of its spiritual world is also illustrated.

Meghnad Desai, British labour politician, writing for Indian Express had asserted that Das did not retell the story as has often been done and instead, he took episodes and characters who pose moral and ethical questions. Desai also criticised Indian university system for not having good library for studying Sanskrit, in the context that author had to go Chicago for an year to study Sanskrit to prepare this book. A K Bhattacharya had explained the book as Gurcharan Das’ quest for the true meaning of Dharma, as expounded in Mahabharata. In the column for Business Standard, Bhattacharya wrote:

So, Krishna, as Das has argued in a different context, was using “evil” to fight “evil”. The question is: Was that really evil and whether it was not Dharma? Debating the relevance or irrelevance of Dharma in such a battle indeed became a little meaningless. There is little doubt that Mahabharata as an epic raises intricate issues pertaining to the relevance of human action in a given role and in the context of pre-ordained fate. The debate over Dharma is also relevant. But Das would have done better if he had narrated the story of Mahabharata in all its details, instead of grappling with the ideas of Dharma or Nishkama Karma Yoga.

N Chandra Mohan, for Hindustan Times, wrote that Das certainly thinks that a healthy dose of Dharma may restore trust in the system. Additionally, he wrote that this book will certainly make Mahabharata accessible to a whole new generation.

== Translation ==
Book was translated in Hindi as Acchai Ki Kathinai and was published by Penguin Random House.

== See also ==
- The Elephant Paradigm
- India Unbound
- The Dilemma of an Indian Liberal
