= Between Queens and the Cities =

2020 memoir by Niranjan Kunwar

- Cover page of the 1st edition
- Author: Niranjan Kunwar
- Cover artist: Ubahang Nembang
- Language: English
- Genres: Memoir, Autobiography
- Publisher: FinePrint
- Publication date: 5 December 2020
- Publication place: Nepal
- Pages: 324
- ISBN: 9798697756034
- Website: Official site

Between Queens and the Cities is a 2022 memoir by Niranjan Kunwar. It was published in 2020 by FinePrint Publication. It is the first English queer memoir to be published in Nepal. The book chronicles the life of the author as gay man between various cities like New York City, Kathmandu between 1999 and 2019. The book shows the struggle of a gay person in Nepali society.

== Synopsis ==
The book chronicles the life of the author from 1999, when he left for New York from Kathmandu at the age of 19 to coming back to Kathmandu. It show the struggle of being a queer person and challenges that an LGBT+ person has to face in Nepali society.

== Reception ==
The book received positive responses from the critics and readers. Sahina Shrestha hailed the book as " beautifully crafted coming of age story" in her review for the Nepali Times.

== See also ==
- Land Where I Flee
- Arresting God in Kathmandu
