= The Elephant Paradigm =

Book on changes in India

The Elephant Paradigm: India Wrestles with Change
- Author: Gurcharan Das
- Language: Indian English
- Genre: Collection of essays, non-fiction
- Publication place: India
- ISBN: 9780143029106
- Website: https://penguin.co.in/book/non-fiction/the-elephant-paradigm/

The Elephant Paradigm: India Wrestles with Change is a collection of essays written by journalist and economist Gurcharan Das. In this book, Das covers a larger area looking at how India is wrestling with change. This book is a sequel of India Unbound.

== Synopsis ==
The book is divided into three parts where first part is about India's economic liberation, second part is about behaviour in private space and third part is about behaviour in public spaces.

The first part of the book, The Temper of our Times consists of three chapters. First chapter, Our Liberating Nineties, talks about economic liberation of India and how India changed in those transition period. The second chapter, Understanding our Times, is about learning lessons from the economic history of India and mistakes to avoid. The last chapter, What is Wrong with our Temper, is about asking questions to Indians why their temper is so low.

The second part of the book, Private Space, starts with the chapter called Laptops and Meditation which deals with balancing personal life and work. Next chapter is A Sentimental Education which is about educational values like how to write and how to read well and commitment to liberal values, followed by chapter Playing To Win in which Das shows steps on how to win in a competitive market.

The last and third part of the book is Public Space. Seventh chapter Learning to live, living to learn is about reforms needed by Indian education system. Eighth chapter deals with agricultural reforms which are required in India and how local self-government should work in rural India. To reform or Not to reform is the ninth chapter of a book in which the author blames poor governance of India and their weak advocacy to reform. Tenth chapter namely What slows us down deals with connection of capitalism with democracy and subsequently, last chapter, making the nation competitive discusses the issue of competitiveness in the open market from the perspective of political leaders aka policy makers of India.

== Overview ==
As a sequel to India Unbound, this book is collection of 11 essays which are segueing from one to another within each section.

The Elephant Paradigm is about an ancient civilization's reawakening to the spirit and potential of its youth and ranges over a vast area and covering subjects as varied as panchayati raj, national competitiveness, and the sacred and philosophical concerns of the average Indian consequent to India's entry into what the author calls the 'age of liberation'. Das argues that India may never roar ahead like the Asian tigers but it will advance like a wise elephant which is moving steadily and surely, pausing occasionally to reflect on its past and to enjoy the journey.

== Reception ==
N. R. Narayana Murthy, at the launch of the event, said that every civil servant should be made to read it. The Statesman categorized the book as one of "5 must-read soul-stirring books" written by Gurcharan Das.

== See also ==
- The Difficulty of Being Good
- India Unbound
- The Dilemma of an Indian Liberal
