= Dor Bahadur Bista =

Nepalese anthropologist

Dor Bahadur Bista Father of Nepalese anthropology
- डोरबहादुर बिष्ट
- Born: 15 April 1928; Jharuwarasi, Patan, Nepal
- Disappeared: January 1995; Jumla District, Nepal
- Education: University of London
- Occupations: Anthropologist, activist
- Notable work: People of Nepal (1967); Fatalism and Development (1991)
- Spouse: Narayani Bista

Dor Bahadur Bista or Dor Bahadur Bist(Nepali: डोर बहादुर बिष्ट) (born ca. 1924–1928) is a Nepalese anthropologist, social scientist and activist. Bista is considered the Father of Nepali anthropology, and has published popular books such as Fatalism and Development and People of Nepal. Bista mysteriously disappeared in 1995.

== Biography ==
Sources vary regarding Bista's date of birth. According to some sources, he was born on 15 April 1928 while there have also been some speculations that he might have been born around 1924, or in 1928. He graduated from Patan High School, after which he attended Tri Chandra College. He completed his Certificate in Indian Ethnography in London.

=== Career ===
While working as a government headmaster in a girls' high school in Patan, Bista became a research assistant to Professor Christoph Furer-Haimendorf of London University who was conducting field research in the area of Solukhumbu. He later claimed that it was this experience that ignited his interest in Anthropology.

In 1972 he was appointed to Lhasa in Tibet as Nepal's Counsel General.

He established an organization called Karnali Institute in Jumla.

In the 1980s, Bista was a member of the board of governors of ICIMOD.

== Disappearance ==
In January 1995, Bista mysteriously disappeared from Jumla District, being last seen boarding a bus to Chisapani or Dhangadhi. His wife, Narayani, with whom he had a daughter and three sons, died soon after.

== Bibliography ==
=== Books ===
- 1967. People of Nepal. Kathmandu: Department of Publicity, Ministry of Information and Broadcasting, His Majesty's Government of Nepal.
- 1971. People of Nepal (with a new chapter on Dhangar). Second edition. Kathmandu: Ratna Pustak Bhandar.
- 1972. Sabai Jatko Fulbari. Kathmandu: Sajha Prakashan.
- 1979. Report from Lhasa. Kathmandu: Sajha Prakashan.
- 1988. Past, Present and Future of Nepal. Unpublished manuscript.
- 1991. Fatalism and Development: Nepal's Struggle for Modernization. Calcutta: Orient Longman.
- 1996. People of Nepal (with a new chapter on Khasha). Sixth edition. Kathmandu: Ratna Pustak Bhandar.
- 2002. Sabai Jatko Fulbari. Kathmandu: Himal Books. (Introduction By Harka Gurung).

=== Articles ===
- 1957. Ramailo Khumbu ra Kehi Sherpa Lok Git. Dafechari 6(5): 3‐14.
- 1958. Educational Problems in the Northern Border Areas of Nepal. Educational Quarterly 2(3): 98‐102.
- 1958. Report of an Educational Fact Finding Excursion to North East Nepal. Educational Quarterly 2(4): 157‐163.
- 1958. Jilla Parichaya‐ Solu Khumbu. Vikash 1(4): 28‐31.4
- 1960. Himalka Chaunrigoth ra Kehi Gothale Git. Sangam 1(3): 5‐8.
- 1964. A Visit to Dang Deukhuri. In USAID/Nepal: Community Development Division, Field Trip Report, pp. 1‐64.
- 1965. A Brief Report on the Study of Jiri‐Sikri Area and the Activities of Jiri Multipurpose Development Project. Unpublished report, Tribhuvan University [co‐written with Hari Mohan Shrestha].
- 1966. Tengboje Gumba. Rup Rekha 6(12): 22‐24.
- 1967. Dolpa Yatrako Dayaribata. Rup Rekha 8(4): 10‐14.
- 1968. Des Vikashma Dharmik Biswasko Asar. Rup Rekha 8(9): 50‐56.
- 1969. The Innovators of Upper Kali Gandaki. Ramjham 5(3): 35‐42.
- 1969. The Forgotten People of Dang Valley. Vasudha 11(10): 10‐14.
- 1970. Cultural Change and Royal Wedding. Vasudha 13(4): 19‐24.
- 1970. Hindu Kingdom and its Social Aspects. In Nepal: A Profile. B.P. Shrestha, ed., pp. 53‐63. Kathmandu: Nepal Council of Applied Economic Research.
- 1970. Nepali Wedding Procedures. In Hamro Samskriti (special issue). Krishna Prasad Adhikari, ed., pp. 130‐136. Kathmandu: Department of Culture.
- 1971. Chepang. The Nepal Digest 1(5): 94‐106.
- 1971. Administration of Development Programs in the Himalayan Area. In Aspects of Development Administration. Prachanda Pradhan, ed., pp. 57‐61. Kathmandu: Centre for Economic and Development Administration (CEDA), Tribhuvan University.
- 1971. Frustration in Nepali Bureaucracy. In Aspects of Development Administration. Prachanda Pradhan, ed., pp. 33‐39. Kathmandu: CEDA, Tribhuvan University.5
- 1971. The Political Innovators of Upper Kali Gandaki. Man 6(1): 52‐60.
- 1973. The People. In Nepal in Perspective. Pashupati Shumshere J.B. Rana and Kamal P. Malla, eds., pp. 35‐46. Kathmandu: CEDA, Tribhuvan University.
- 1975. Chepang Jatiko Samajik Arthik Sammunati Sarbekchan (Pariyojana Pratibedan). Kathmandu: CEDA, Tribhuvan University [co‐written with Navin Kumar Rai].
- 1976. Encounter with the Raute: The Last Hunting Nomads of Nepal. Kailash: A Journal of Himalayan Studies 4(4): 317‐327.
- 1976. Padipur: A Central Terai Village. Contributions to Nepalese Studies 3(1): 1‐32.
- 1977. Patterns of Migration in Nepal. In Himalaya: Ecologie‐Ethnologie. CNRS, No. 268: 397‐399. Paris.
- 1977. Rastriye Ekata. Rup Rekha 18(8): 102‐114.
- 1978. Nepalese in Tibet. In Himalayan Anthropology: The Indo Tibetan Interface. James F. Fisher, ed., pp. 187‐204. The Hague, Paris: Mouton.
- 1978. Manavsastra/ Samajsastrama Anusandhan [Research in Anthropology/Sociology]. Tribhuvan University Journal 10(1): 277‐284 [co‐written with Trilok S. Thapa and Dilli Ram Dahal].
- 1980. Hindu Kingdom and its Social Aspect. In Nepal a Conspectus. Kamal P. Malla, ed., pp. 14‐23. Kathmandu: His Majesty's Government Press.
- 1980. Prospects of Anthropology in Nepal. A paper presented at a seminar on social sciences, Tribhuvan University.
- 1980. Nepalese in Tibet. Contributions to Nepalese Studies 8(1): 1‐19.6
- 1982. The Process of Nepalization. In Anthropological and Linguistic Studies of the Gandaki Area in Nepal (Monumenta Serindica 10). Dor Bahadur Bista, et al., eds., pp. 1‐20. Tokyo: Institute for the Study of Languages and Cultures of Asia and Africa.
- 1984. Aasamanjasyeta Ko Paristhiti Aaja Ko Hamro Yetharthata Ho. In Byaktitwora Bichar (Interview Given to Kishor Kunwar). Kathmandu: Shakti Printers.
- 1985. Ethnicity: Its Problems and Prospects, unpublished report submitted to Centre for Nepal and Asian Studies.
- 1987. Nepal School of Sociology and Anthropology. Occasional Papers in Sociology and Anthropology 1: 6‐10.
- 1989. Nepal in 1988: Many Losses, Some Gains. Asian Survey 29(2): 223‐228.
- 1989. The Structure of Nepali Society. In Nepal: Perspectives on Continuity and Change. Kamal P. Malla, ed., pp. 169‐191. Kirtipur: Centre for Nepal and Asian Studies.
- 1995. Khas of Chaudabisa. Himal 8(3): 45‐48.
- 1995. Nepalko Jatiye Bividhata: Samasyako Jaro Ki Sakaratmak Srot? Himal 5(2): 7‐12.
- 1995. Chaudabise ko Anuvab: Khasharuma Aatma‐ Pahichanko Sankat. Himal 5(4): 40‐43.
- 1996. An Interview with Dor Bahadur Bista. Current Anthropology 37(2): 349‐356. (Interview given to James F. Fisher). Reprinted in Himalayan Research Bulletin 17(1): 25‐32.
- 1997. Comments on 'Sociological and Anthropological Research and Teaching in Nepal: Western Adaptation Versus Indigenization'. In Social Sciences in Nepal: Some Thoughts and Search for Direction. Prem K. Khatry, ed., pp. 31‐34. Kathmandu: Centre for Nepal and Asian Studies.

== Legacy ==
The Association for Nepal and Himalayan Studies, which took over from the Nepal Studies Association of which Bista had been Honorary President, awards a prize named after him on an annual basis.

Castaway Man, a documentary surrounding Bista's disappearance was released in 2015. The 82 minute documentary was directed by Kesang Tseten.

== See also ==
- List of people who disappeared mysteriously: 1910–1990
