= Land Where I Flee =

2013 novel by Prajwal Parajuly

- First edition
- Author: Prajwal Parajuly
- Language: English
- Genre: Contemporary fiction
- Set in: Gangtok, Sikkim
- Published: November 14, 2013
- Publisher: Quercus
- Publication place: India
- Media type: Print, E-book
- Pages: 266
- ISBN: 9781780872971
- Preceded by: The Gurkha's Daughter

Land Where I Flee is a novel by a Nepali speaking Indian writer Prajwal Parajuly. It was published on November 14, 2013, by Quercus. It is the first novel and the second book of the author who had previously published a collection of short stories titled The Gurkha's Daughter which was shortlisted for Dylan Thomas Prize.

== Synopsis ==
The book centres on a Nepali-Indian family from the state of Sikkim. Chitralekha Neupaney, an 84-year-old woman, is the matriarch of the family and has raised her grandchildren since the death of their parents. On the occasion of her 84th birthday (Chaurasi), there is a family reunion of the four grandchildren who live in different parts of the world. Prasanti is the eunuch maid of the house who is very domineering. The novel deals with several themes such as identity and family.

== Characters ==
- Chitralekha Neupaney, an 84 year old matriarch of the house
- Prasanti, the eunuch help of the household
- Bhagwati, one of the four grandchildren
- Agastya, one of the four grandchildren
- Ruthwa, one of the four grandchildren
- Manasa, one of the four grandchildren

== Translation ==
It was translated into French as Fuir et Revenir by Benoîte Dauvergne.

== Reception ==
The French translation of the book was nominated for France's First Novel Prize. The book was also longlisted for the Emile Guimet Prize. Manjula Narayan of Hindustan Times praised the book as "one of the best novels of the year' in his review. Jane Housham called it as "a caustic look at family life" in her review for The Guardian.

== See also ==
- The Gurkha's Daughter
- Faatsung
- The Wayward Daughter
