= Pranaya SJB Rana =

Nepalese writer

- प्रणय श०ज०ब० राणा
- Other names: Pranaya Rana
- Occupations: Writer, journalist
- Notable work: City of Dreams

Pranaya SJB Rana is a writer, editor and journalist based in Kathmandu, Nepal. He is currently editor of The Record, a digital-native news publication focusing on long form reporting, essays, and explainers. Rana was previously features editor and op-ed editor of The Kathmandu Post and a reporter for Nepali Times. Rana is also the author of a collection of short stories, City of Dreams: Stories, published by Rupa Publications, India.

== Career ==
Rana started his journalism career as a reporter for Nepali Times and Wave Magazine, both published by Himalmedia. He went on to become op-ed editor for The Kathmandu Post from 2012 to 2015 and then Features Editor from 2018 to 2020. At the Post, Rana authored a series of popular interviews called Brunch with the Post with a wide range of Nepali personalities including politicians, businesspersons, artists, academics, and musicians. The interviews were modelled after the Financial Times' Lunch with the FT.

Rana is currently editor-in-chief of The Record.

== Notable publications ==
Rana is the author of a collection of short stories, City of Dreams: Stories, published in 2015 by Rupa Publications. The collection was favorably reviewed in Nepal with one review calling Rana "a bold writer, willing to push against the boundaries of what we might have come to expect of South Asian writers".

Rana co-authored a series of investigative reports for the Post exposing the various shady dealings of German watchmaker Michael Kobold. He also led an investigation into the decades-long abuse of students by a mathematics teacher at the Lalitpur Madhyamik Vidyalaya school.

== See also ==
- Samrat Upadhyay
- Manjushree Thapa
- Rabi Thapa
