= Dhritarashtra (book) =

Nepali epic by Ghanshyam Kandel

- Front cover of the book
- Author: Ghanshyam Kandel
- Original title: धृतराष्ट्र
- Language: Nepali
- Genre: Short epic, Poetry
- Publisher: Airawati Prakashan
- Publication date: 2016
- Publication place: Nepal
- Pages: 96
- Awards: Madan Puraskar
- ISBN: 9789937644471

Dhritarashtra (Nepali: धृतराष्ट्र) is a poetry book by Ghanshyam Kandel. It was published in 2016 by Airawati Prakashan. It is a short epic in verse and retells the story of the Mahabharat through the eyes of the blind king of Hastinapur, Dhritarashtra. It won the Madan Puraskar, 2073 B.S.

It is an epic poem and the author's sixth book. A reimagining of the Mahabharata, the book retells the epic from the blind king’s perspective and aims to reevaluate preconceived notions of justice and morality.

== Synopsis ==
Dhritarashtra is told from the viewpoint of Dhritarashtra, the blind king, and focuses on how he perceives the protagonists of the Mahabharata War. The original Mahabharata depicts Krishna as a charismatic leader who fights for truth and justice. But in Kandel’s verse, Krishna appears as a crafty conspirator who tricks others into fighting the brutal war at Kurukshetra and plots the murder of Duryodhan and Dronacharya.

== Reception ==
The book won the Madan Puraskar, 2073 BS (2016).

== See also ==
- Gauri
- Muna Madan
- Naya Ishwar Ko Ghoshana
- Tarun Tapasi
