= The Wayward Daughter (novel) =

2018 novel by Shradha Ghale

The Wayward Daughter: A Kathmandu Story
- Cover page
- Author: Shradha Ghale
- Language: Nepali
- Genre: Contemporary fiction
- Set in: Kathmandu
- Published: 2018
- Publisher: Speaking Tiger Books
- Publication place: Nepal, India
- Media type: Print (Paperback), E-book
- ISBN: 978-93-88070-58-4

The Wayward Daughter: A Kathmandu Story is a 2018 novel by Shradha Ghale. It was published on 1 December 2018, by Speaking Tiger Books. It is the debut novel of the author. It is a coming of age story of a girl in 1990s Kathmandu during the Nepalese civil war.

== Synopsis ==
Sumnima Tamule is a student in Rhododendron High School. Most of her peers are from rich families and are planning to go abroad for their higher education. She is from a middle-class family and got second division in her studies, she has to settle for an obscure college in the city. After Sunmina's poor performance in the exam, her parents expectation falls upon her younger sister, Numa. Subsequently, her cousins from Lungla, a village in remote Nepal comes to Sumnina's place fleeing the civil war troubles. Her life is caught in a frenzy amidst all new changes in her household. The book also depicts the class and caste differences in cosmopolitan Kathmandu.

== Characters ==
- Sumnima Tamule—a high school graduate student, major protagonist of the book
- Numa—Sumnima's sister
- Boju—Sumnima's foul mouthed grandmother
- Gajey—Sumnima's father
- Premkala—Sumnima's mother
- Ganga—Sumnima's cousin
- Manlahari—Sumnima's cousin
- Sagar Karky—Sumnima's US-returned boyfriend and an RJ
- Rajan—Sumina's uncle

== Themes ==
The book depicts the various class and caste division within Nepali society. The major character belongs to an indigenous community from Nepal. Although, the community that Sumnima belongs to is fictional, Ghale took inspiration from many other indigenous community of Nepal to create the customs of Tamule family. The book also discrimination of women in a patriarchal Nepalese society. The women in the book are bounded by various gender roles set by the society. The book also shows the impact of the Maoist unrest in the lives of common people in Nepal and how they had to leave their villages and hometown to cities for their safety.

== Reception ==
The book was received positively by critics and readers in Nepal. Uday Adhikari of The Gorkha Times praised the book as " vibrant piece of social reality". Nandita Bose praised Ghale's writing as "simple, profound, witty and effective" in her review for The Deccan Herald. Richa Bhattarai in her review for The Wire recommended the book for "an exploration of Nepal over the past few decades through the eyes of a perceptive and skillful writer". Pranaya Rana, reviewing the book for The Kathmandu Post, called it "a finely wrought novel, astutely observed and honestly told."

== See also ==
- Forget Kathmandu
- City of Dreams
- Tilled Earth
