= Naya Ishwar Ko Ghoshana =

2004 Nepali epic by Gopal Parajuli

- Nepali edition
- Author: Gopal Parajuli
- Original title: नयाँ ईश्वरको घोषणा
- Translator: Govinda Raj Bhattarai
- Language: Nepali
- Genre: Poetry
- Published: 2004
- Publisher: Lipi Books
- Publication place: Nepal
- Media type: Print
- Pages: 198
- Award: Madan Puraskar
- ISBN: 9789937918695
- OCLC: 56904833

Naya Ishwar Ko Ghoshana (Nepali: नयाँ ईश्वरको घोषणा) is a Nepali epic by Gopal Parajuli. It was published in 2004 by Antarastriya Nepali Sahitya Samaj (International Nepali Literary Society) and won the prestigious Madan Puraskar for the year 2060 BS (c. 2003-04).

== Synopsis ==
The epic is divided into two sections. Each section consists of 98 paragraphs. The poem is written in modern experimental style.

== Reception ==
The book won the Madan Puraskar, one of the most foremost Nepali literary award. It also won the INLS Best Book Award.

== Translation ==
The book was translated into English as Declaration of a New God by Dr. Govinda Raj Bhattarai in 2008.

== See also ==
- Dhritarashtra
- Muna Madan
- Gauri
