= Fatalism and Development: Nepal's Struggle for Modernization =

1991 book by Dor Bahadur Bista

- Cover of Fatalism and Development: Nepal's Struggle for Modernization
- Author: Dor Bahadur Bista
- Language: English
- Publisher: Orient Longman Limited
- Publication date: 1991
- Publication place: Nepal
- ISBN: 8125001883

Fatalism and Development: Nepal's Struggle for Modernization is the most notable book about the local socio-cultural issues of Nepalese people. It is written by the renowned and most controversial anthropologist of Nepal, Dor Bahadur Bista.

== See also ==
- The Nepal Nexus
- All Roads Lead North
