= Malati Robot =

Science fiction novel by Mukti Upadhyay Baral

- Book art of the Nepal edition
- Author: Mukti Upadhyay Baral
- Translator: Nagendra Sharma
- Language: Nepali
- Publication date: 2011
- English publication date: 2016
- ISBN: 9789937652353

Malati Robot is a teen science fiction novel, written by Indian author Mukti Upadhyay Baral. Originally published in 2011 in Nepali, the English translation of the novel was published by Book-Art Nepal in 2016. In 2015, it was awarded the Bal Sahitya Puraskar by the Sahitya Akademi. The title of the novel, is derived from the robot created in the image of Malati, the protagonist.

The characters of Dr Hiroshi Kobayashi and SAYA , are a reference to the real-world scientist from Tokyo University and his invention.

== Plot ==
Malati, a young school girl, characterized by her deep love for nature, takes every opportunity she gets to play in the forest nearby. She befriends the residents of the forest. One day, when playing with the birds, Malati spots a humanoid figure drawing water from a river. Intrigued, Malati engages in its pursuit and observes it entering a cave. Stalking it further, the figure is seen approaching a solid stone effigy of Ganesh inside the cave. After performing a brief ritual, the figure enters a trapdoor behind the statue's wall and disappears. Malati does the same and makes her way inside. Upon entry, she discovers a multichambered laboratory, with an ailing man resting in one of the rooms. At that moment, a huge trumpet blares outside and causes Malati to shriek, revealing her presence. Upon conversing, the man tries to feign being a sadhu, but Malati retorts that Sadhu's do not have computers and scientific equipment lying around. The sadhu reveals himself to be Vivek and tells Malati his backstory.

Vivek was raised solely by his father, a science teacher. Upon his father's request, he began his MBBS to becomes a doctor, despite his desire to pursue robotics. In his third year of medical school, Vivek won a national science fair, and was rewarded a visit to the Tokyo University of Science. There under the tutelage of Dr Hiroshi Kobayashi, he became part of the team which developed SAYA, a real-world humanoid robot capable of performing basic speech. Inspired, Vivek upon his return to India, worked on and developed a formula for a sentient robot. With the sole exception of his father, nobody believed in his claims and people doubted his sanity. Additionally Vivek failed to procure the funds required to bring the robot into fruition. After his father's death, he turned into a vagabond, roaming from mandir to mandir, finally settling upon an abandoned Ganesh shrine in a cave. He befriends an elephant and names her Sangini. The locals revere him as a holy man, dubbing him 'Hathi Baba'. Soon electricity is provided to the cave and enables the ageing Vivek to create a robot to help him with routine upkeep. This robot, is the figure Malati saw at the river. Yet, his wish to build a sentient robot remain unfulfilled.

Upon learning this, Malati offers money to Vivek to fulfill his wish, with the condition that he will build her a sentient replica of herself, once his needs are met. He accepts in jest. The next day, Malati convinces her rich father Ratnamani, to invest in an advanced robotics factory and claims she will provide the expertise. Vivek, upon meeting Malati's father, realizes the seriousness of Malati's offer and suggests that they must travel abroad to conduct some research. After travelling to Japan, America and Germany, they start work on one of Ratnamani's barren plots of land, refusing to breach woodland. Vivek, fulfilling his end of the bargain, creates a 'Malati robot' and gives it to Malati. Unbeknownst to her parents, she sends the robot to school and her grades soar, while she enjoys herself in the forest.

One day, repeating an established routine, Malati deploys the robot from the cave, to accompany Shyam Kaka, the family driver, back to her home. On route, their car collides with a tractor, resulting in Shyam Kaka's death and the robot's destruction. Malati discovers this in time and swaps herself in with the robot's wreckage, to conceal her ruse. Her grades plummet, which her parents and teachers attribute to trauma. Vivek recognizes her struggles and encourages her to learn, utilizing play based learning and Malati's grades recover. Soon, Vivek completes making another clone for Malati, which she refuses to accept. She states that she is capable of being herself. Finally a convention is held to reveal Vivek's invention to the world. The guests observe the young Malati helping with the preparations on stage. She gives a speech and reveals that the Malati everyone is seeing is actually a robot and the real Malati rides in on Sangini the elephant.

== Reception ==
Aside from winning the Bal Sahitya Puraskar in 2015, Malati Robot is acknowledged for being an adopter of science-fiction elements in the Nepali literary scene; including its mentioning of SAYA, years before the project's mainstream popularity. Critics have also mentioned that Malati Robot serves as the prequel to Baral's later work Kanchi which explores human-robot romance. The novel also serves as the starting point for Baral's later exploration into the themes of sentience and artificial intelligence. The novel has been introduced into the syllabi of certain Nepali college courses.
