= Sudheer Sharma =

Nepali writer (born 1975)

- सुधीर शर्मा
- Born: 1975 (age 50–51); Dhulabari, Jhapa District, Nepal
- Occupations: Writer, journalist
- Employer: Kantipur Media Group
- Known for: Prayogshala, The Nepal Nexus; Kantipur Daily (Editor-in-chief)
- Title: Editor-in-Chief
- Spouse: Kalpana Dhakal
- Children: Saumik Sharma

Sudheer Sharma (Nepali: सुधीर शर्मा) is a Nepalese writer and journalist. He was the Editor-in-Chief of Nepal's largest-selling daily Kantipur from 2008 to 2018 and from 2019 to 2024. He is also the author of books Prayogshala and The Nepal Nexus.
