= People of Nepal (book) =

1967 book by Dor Bahadur Bista

- Author: Dor Bahadur Bista
- Publisher: Asia Book Corp of Amer
- Publication date: 4th edition (January 1981)
- Publication place: Nepal
- Pages: 252
- ISBN: 99933-0-418-2

People of Nepal is a 1967 book by Dor Bahadur Bista. The book is the first relatively comprehensive view of the vast array of Nepalese cultures, castes and ethnic groups, with descriptions of their unique customs. It is written by anthropologist Dor Bahadur Bista.

Bista visited East Nepal with Christoph von Fürer-Haimendorf in the 1950s. People of Nepal contains his ethnographic notes from the visit.

University of Zurich professor Werner M. Egli wrote in his 2014 book The Sunuwar of Nepal and their Sense of Communication that People of Nepal is a "classic". Anthropologist and linguist Mark Turin, a professor at the University of British Columbia, wrote in his 2012 book A Grammar of the Thangmi Language that People of Nepal was "definitive". The Nepali Times called Bista's book a "seminal work".
