= All Roads Lead North =

2021 non-fiction book by Amish Raj Mulmi

All Roads Lead North: Nepal's Turn to China
- Cover page of the 1st edition
- Author: Amish Raj Mulmi
- Language: English
- Subject: Nepal's relationship with China
- Genre: Political, geopolitical
- Published: 2021 (Westland Books) (English)
- Publisher: Westland Books (India); Hurst Publishers (USA); Oxford University Press (UK)
- Publication date: 15 March 2021
- Publication place: Nepal, India
- Media type: Print
- Pages: 320
- ISBN: 9789390679096

All Roads Lead North: Nepal's Turn to China is a 2021 non-fiction book by journalist Amish Raj Mulmi. It was published on 15 March 2021 by Context (an imprint of Westland Books), and published by Hurst Publishers and Oxford University Press in the UK and US respectively as All Roads Lead North: China, Nepal and the Contest for the Himalayas. It was chosen among The Guardian's 'Books that explain the world' in 2021.

The book explores the geopolitical relationship of Nepal with its two neighbors, China and India.

== Synopsis ==
The book studies and analyzes the eroding relationship of Nepal with India and the budding relationship with China. While the Indian media and political figures have blamed and criticized Nepal for increasing closeness with China, the book shows and explains the historical relationship between China and Nepal, and Tibet and Nepal. The book shows how trans-Himalayan trade and Buddhism shaped relations between Tibet and Nepal since the 7th century. It talks about the impact of Chinese development on Himalayan communities, and portrays the complex story of China's influence in Nepal. The 2015 Nepal blockade was one of the major turning points of the changing equation of the diplomatic ties of Nepal with its neighbors. Also, the Kalapani territory dispute further damaged the Indo-Nepal relationship.

== Reception ==
Former Indian foreign secretary Shyam Saran called the book "a finely grained narrative". Former Indian ambassador to Nepal M.S. Puri has written that the book is "strongly grounded his work in the historical and societal dynamics around Nepal’s northern areas".The Asian Review of Books said the book is "a concise modern history of the complicated triangle of Nepal, China and India relations and how a focus on one of Nepal’s neighbors always needs to factor in the other." Biswas Baral of The Annapurna Post praised the book and said "the book will be read by generations to come, by scholars and non-scholars alike". Kallol Bhattacherjee of The Hindu called it a "a must-read to understand India-Nepal ties". Anand K Sahay described the book as "a well worth a read to better understand Beijing’s ways" in his review for the Deccan Chronicle. Maj Gen Ashok K Mehta (Retd.) in his review for The Tribune (Chandigarh) called the book a "must read".

== See also ==
- The Nepal Nexus
- Fatalism and Development: Nepal's Struggle for Modernization
- Forget Kathmandu
- Unleashing Nepal
