= Prajwal Parajuly =

Indian author of Nepalese descent

- प्रज्वल पराजुली
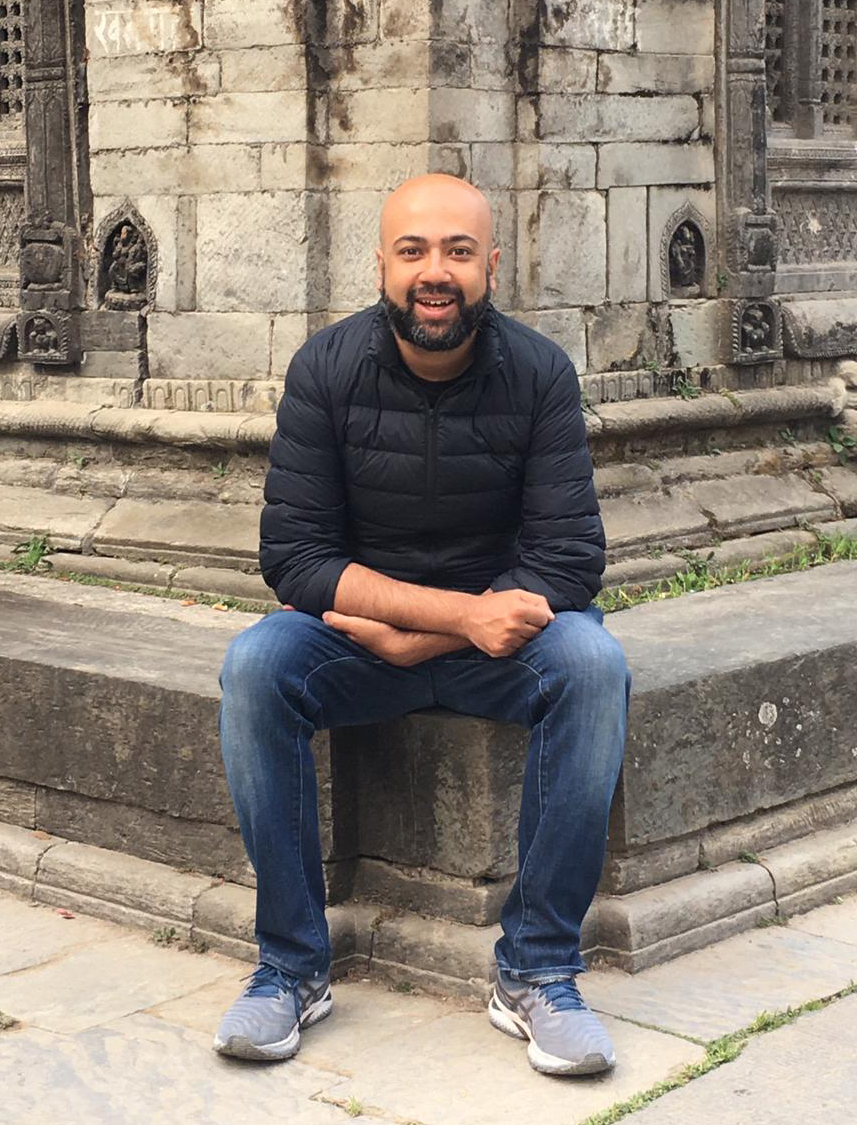
- Born: 24 October 1984 (age 42); Gangtok, Sikkim, India
- Education: BA, Truman State University MSt, Kellogg College, Oxford
- Occupation: Author
- Writing career
- Language: English
- Period: 2011-present
- Genres: Literary fiction; short story; Children's literature
- Notable works: The Gurkha's Daughter; Land Where I Flee
- Website: asuitableagency.com/our-writers/prajwal-parajuly/

Prajwal Parajuly (né Sharma; born 24 October 1984) is an Indian writer and columnist known for his works that focus on Nepali people and their culture. Parajuly's notable works include the short-story collection The Gurkha's Daughter and novel Land Where I Flee.

== Early life ==
Parajuly grew up in the Gangtok, Sikkim region of northeastern India. His father is an Indian Nepalese and his mother Nepalese. He was educated at Truman State University in Kirksville, Missouri, and the University of Oxford. Before committing to a writing career, he worked as an advertising executive at The Village Voice.

== Career ==
In September 2011, Parajuly became the youngest Indian author to be offered a two-book, multi-country deal. He was signed by Quercus. He published his first book in 2012: a short story collection with the title The Gurkha's Daughter: Stories. Describing and dramatizing the experiences of the Nepalese people and the Nepalese diaspora, his debut book was shortlisted for the 2013 Dylan Thomas Prize and longlisted for The Story Prize that same year.

Parajuly's second book, the novel Land Where I Flee, came out in 2013. It was an Independent on Sunday book of the year and a Kansas City Star best book of 2015. It was translated and published in French in 2020 and was nominated the same year for the Debut Novel Prize and a finalist for the Émile Guimet Prize for Asian Literature. He was the first writer-in-residence at The Oxford Centre for Hindu Studies in 2013. In 2016, Prajwal Parajuly was invited to be a judge for the Dylan Thomas Prize.

Parajuly has written for The New York Times, The Guardian, the New Statesman and the BBC.

Since 2024, Parajuly has been an Assistant Professor of Practice in Creative Writing at the School of Interwoven Arts and Sciences of Krea University in Sri City.

== Works ==
- The Gurkha's Daughter, short story collection, released in December 2012.
- Land Where I Flee, novel, released in December 2013.
