= Kamal P. Malla =

Newar studies scholar (1936–2018)

Kamal Prakash Malla (1936 – 17 November 2018) was a Nepalese linguist) who was professor emeritus of Newar studies at Tribhuvan University, where he was previously university rector.

== Biography ==
He studied at the University of Edinburgh, where he obtained a Ph.D. in 1974, with the thesis "A study of contemporary models of stylistic analysis, literary and linguistic, and their pedagogic relevance".

He researched Newar history and language, including writing a grammar of the Kathmandu dialect. He served as editor-in-chief of a comprehensive dictionary of Classical Newar.

== Works ==
- Malla, Kamal P. 1973. "Language." In Nepal in perspective, edited by S.J.B. Rana Pashupati and eds., K.P. Malla. . Kathmandu, Centre for Economic Development and Administration:101-8.
- Malla, Kamal P. 1973. "A Preliminary Note On the Linguistic Archeology of the Nepal Valley." In Studia Turcologica Cracoviensia,
- Malla, Kamal P. 1975. "Linguistic Studies in Nepal." In Vasudha 15:17-24. (Also pub. in Sharma and Friedman, eds., Seminar papers in linguistics, Kathmandu, INAS, 1-14(1976).
- KP Malla (1979). The road to nowhere. Kathmandu: Sajha Prakashan.
- Malla, Kamal P. 1981. "Linguistic Archeology of the Nepal Valley - a Preliminary Report." In Kailash, 5-23.
- KP Malla (1982) Classical Newari Literature: A Sketch
- Malla, Kamal P. 1984 Impeccable historiography in Nepal: a rebuttal. Nepal Study Centre.
- KP Malla (1985) The Newari language: A working outline.
- D Vajracarya, KP Malla (1985) The Gopalarãjavãmsavalĩ. Steiner Verlag.
- Malla, Kamal P. 1985. "Epigraphy and Society in Ancient Nepal." In Contributions to Nepalese Studies, 13, no. 1.
- Malla, Kamal P. 1989. "Language and Society in Nepal." In Nepal: perspective on continuity and change, edited by Kamal P. Malla. 445-466. Centre for Nepal & Asian Studies, Tribhuvan University.
- Malla, Kamal P. 1990. "The Earliest Dated Document in Newari: the Palmleaf From Uku Bahah NS 235/AD 1114." In Kailash, 16, no. 1-2.
- Malla, Kamal P. 1996. "The Profane Names of the Sacred Hillocks." In Contributions to Nepalese Studies, 23, no. 1.
- Malla, Kamal P. 1998. "The Classical Newari Dictionary Project 1986-1996 : Problems and Prospects." In Lexicography in Nepal : proceedings of the Institute on Lexicography, 1995, edited by Yogendra P. Yadava Tej R. Kansakar. Kathmandu, 104-111. Royal Nepal Acad. Kamaladi.
- Malla, Kamal P. 1999. "The Profane Names of the Sacred Hillocks." In Topics in Nepalese linguistics, edited by Yogendra P Yadava and Warren W Glover. 444-450. Royal Nepal Academy.
- Malla, Kamal P. 2006 (review of) "A History of Nepal by John Whelpton. Cambridge University Press". 'European Bulletin of Himalayan Research.' 26-30: 178-183.
