= Nepal Foods =

Nepalese food company

- Type: Private
- Industry: Foods
- Founded: 2018
- Founder: Bikash Nepal
- Headquarters: Hounslow, England, United Kingdom
- Key people: Bikash Nepal (Founder and CEO)
- Website: www.nepalfoodsonline.co.uk

Nepal Foods is a Nepalese food brand based in the United Kingdom, founded by Bikash Nepal in 2018. The company imports and distributes Nepali food products in the UK and other countries.

== History ==
While pursuing an MBA at the University of Wales in London, Bikash Nepal observed opportunities in the UK's FMCG sector. It began distributing Indian-made FMCG products across the UK. Bikash later decided to establish his own brand specializing in Nepali food products. In 2018, he founded Nepal Foods with his childhood friend Rishab Pyara Shrestha, with an initial investment of 50,000 lakhs.

In the same year, Nepal Foods expanded its operations by partnering with brands such as Dabur, Haldirams, Dairy Valley, Gits, and Ashoka. The company also collaborated with Santosh Shah, winner of the BBC's UK MasterChef: The Professionals Rematch 2021, to promote their products at an event at the House of Lords attended by Nepal's Ambassador to the UK, Gyan Chandra Acharya.

Nepal Foods has a production warehouse in Kirtipur, Nepal, and is headquartered in Hounslow, England. The company distributes its products to various countries, including the US, Germany, Portugal, Poland, Sweden, and Denmark. In 2022, the company reported a turnover of 65 crores.

In 2021, the company established the Nepal Foods Foundation to support the farmers who grow the crops and spices used in their products. The foundation has partnered with PHASE Worldwide, a British charity.

== Awards ==
Nepal Foods has received awards such as the Great Taste Award in 2020 for Buff Sukuti, in 2021 for Lapsi Pickle, and in 2023 for Nepali Masala Chai. In 2022, the company was recognized as the Best Nationwide Nepalese Food Supplier.
