= City of Dreams (short story collection) =

2015 book by Pranaya SJB Rana

City of Dreams: Stories
- Cover page of the book
- Author: Pranaya SJB Rana
- Language: English
- Genre: Short stories
- Set in: Kathmandu
- Published: 2015
- Publisher: Rupa Publications
- Publication date: 2015
- Publication place: India, Nepal
- Media type: Print (Paperback)
- Pages: 190
- ISBN: 978-8129137289

City of Dream: Stories is an anthology of short stories by Pranaya SJB Rana. It was published in 2015 by Rupa Publications. It is the first book by Rana, who is a Nepalese journalist and writer.

== Synopsis ==
The stories are set in and around Kathmandu city. The stories included in the anthology are:

- City of Dreams
- The Smoker
- Dashain
- Our Ruin
- Two
- Maya
- Knife in the Water
- The Red Kurta
- The Presence of God
- The Child

== Reception ==
The collection was favorably reviewed in Nepal with one review calling Rana "a bold writer, willing to push against the boundaries of what we might have come to expect of South Asian writers".

== See also ==
- The Tutor of History
- The Wayward Daughter
- Arresting God in Kathmandu
