= Gurcharan Das =

Indian author

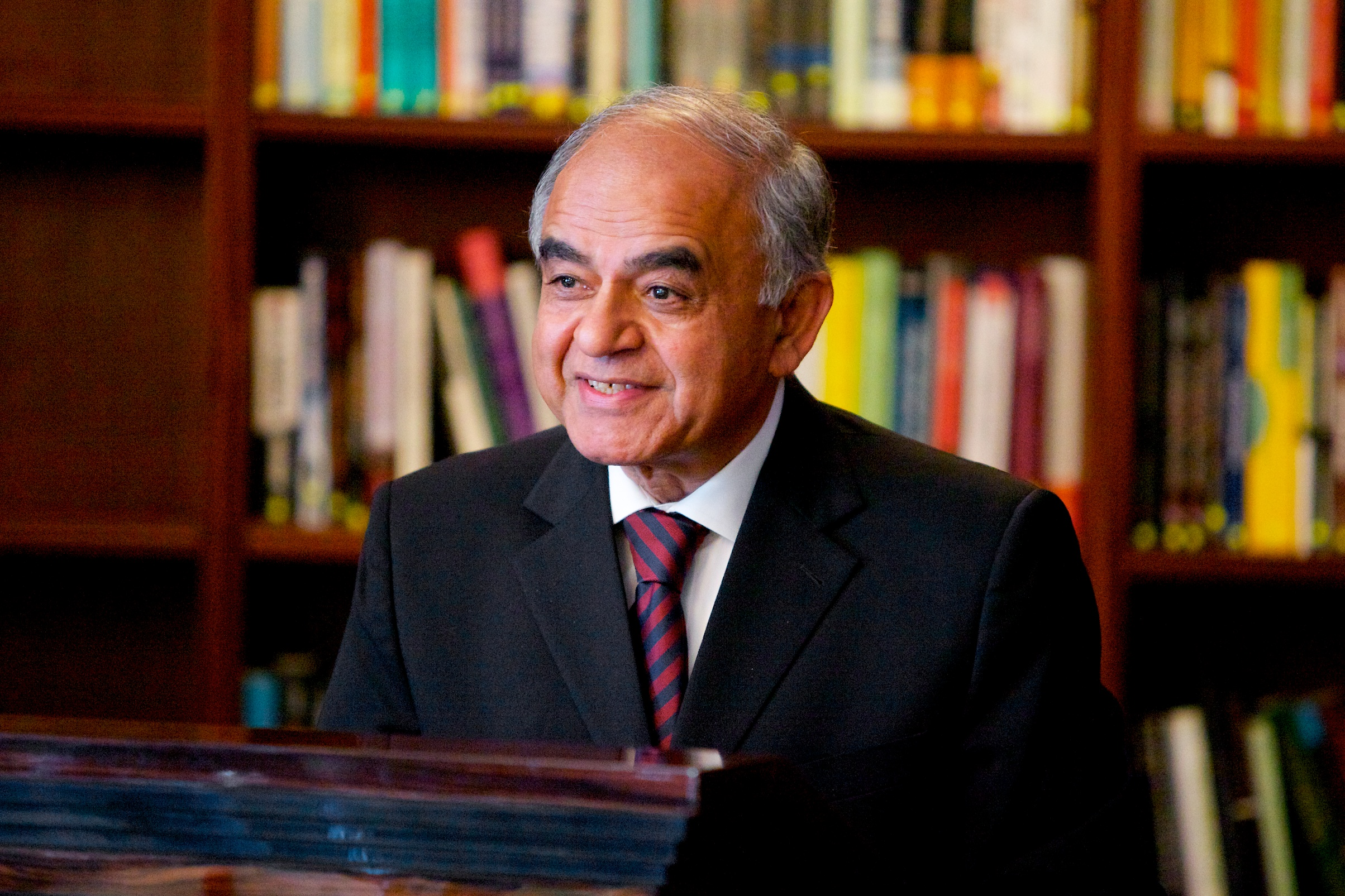
- Gurcharan Das
- Born: 3 October 1943 (age 82); Lyallpur, British India
- Occupation: Author

Gurcharan Das (born 3 October 1943) is an Indian author who wrote a trilogy based on the classical Indian goals of the ideal life.

India Unbound was the first volume (2002), on artha, 'material well-being', which narrated the story of India's economic rise from Independence to the global information age. Published in many languages and filmed by BBC, it was called "a quiet earthquake" by the Guardian. The second, The Difficulty of Being Good, is on dharma or 'moral well-being', and is "rich with learned musings on the epic, Mahabharata and its moral dilemmas" that speak to our day to day contemporary life. Kama: The Riddle of Desire is on the third goal of desire, and recounts a tale of "love and vulnerability, about self-doubt and betrayal, about wanting more of everything and being haunted by settling for less."

Das graduated with honours from Harvard University in Philosophy. He had later attended Harvard Business School (AMP), where he is featured in three case studies. He was CEO of Procter & Gamble India and later managing director, Procter & Gamble Worldwide (Strategic Planning). At age 50, he took early retirement to become a full-time writer.

Das is a regular columnist for The Times of India and five Indian language newspapers in Hindi, Telugu, Marathi, Tamil, and Gujarati. He also contributes periodically to Financial Times, Foreign Affairs, Wall Street Journal, and the New York Times. Aside from the trilogy, his other literary works include a novel, A Fine Family, two book length essays, India Grows at Nights: A Liberal Case for a Strong State, The Elephant Paradigm, and an anthology, Three English Plays.

== Early life ==
Gurcharan Das was born in Lyallpur, British India (now Faisalabad, Pakistan). He was named Ashok Kumar but was renamed at age three and half years old. His father was an engineer with the government of Punjab. The family lived in Lahore at the time of the partition of India in August 1947 when they had to flee for their lives. They arrived as refugees in Shimla, and this is where the young boy grew up. His father was a passionate mystic and meditated for many hours a day and the boy was raised in an atmosphere charged with Bhakti mysticism. His partially autobiographical novel, A Fine Family, sheds some light on his early life.

In 1952, the family moved to Bhakra Nangal; in 1953, to Delhi, where he went to Modern School. In 1955, his father was transferred to Washington DC, to represent India in talks with Pakistan on the sharing of the waters of the rivers of the Punjab, mediated by the World Bank. He went to high school in Washington D.C. In 1959, he won a scholarship to Harvard University. He graduated from Harvard in 1963 with honours in Philosophy, Politics, and Economics. He wrote his senior thesis under the political philosopher, John Rawls, who had a great influence on his life. Harvard later elected him to Phi Beta Kappa for "high attainments in liberal scholarship."

== Corporate career ==
Instead of accepting a fellowship to do a doctorate in philosophy at the University of Oxford, Gurcharan Das returned home to India. Just before coming back, Das wrote in a letter to his mother that he "just could not imagine living the rest of my life at that stratosphere of abstract thought." While waiting to decide what he wanted to do with his life, he got a job as a trainee in a company that made Vicks Vaporub. He soon discovered that he liked the rough and tumble of the business life "and like the man who came to dinner, I stayed on."

Gurcharan Das rose to become the managing director and Chairman of Richardson Hindustan Limited. Before that he spent two summers at Harvard Business School's Advanced Management Program, where he is featured in three case studies. In 1985, his parent company, Richardson Vicks was acquired by Procter and Gamble and he became the first CEO of Procter & Gamble India and vice-president for Procter & Gamble Far East from 1985 and 1992. He then moved headquarters to become vice-president and managing director, Procter & Gamble Worldwide, responsible for global strategic planning.

At the end of 1994, after a 30-year career in six countries, he took early retirement to become a full-time writer. Before leaving he wrote, 'Local Memoirs of a Global Manager in Harvard Business Review.

He has joined a Bangalore-based edtech company, BrightCHAMPS as an advisor on their Global Curriculum Advisory Board. Das is a member of the Board of Trustees at the Centre for Civil Society, a New Delhi based liberal think-tank.

== Literary career and books ==
Gurcharan Das began his writing career as a "weekend writer". In his twenties, he wrote three plays, which were published together as an anthology, titled Three English Plays, by Oxford University Press in 2001 and later re-published as Three Plays by Penguin India in 2011.

At age 23, he wrote his first play, Larins Sahib, which won the Sultan Padamsee Prize in 1968. It was produced by the Theatre Group in Bombay in 1969, published by Oxford University Press in the UK in 1970, and later presented at the Edinburgh Festival in 1991. A historical play about the British in India, it is set during the confused period after the death of Ranjit Singh in the Punjab with a focus on an unusual Englishman in India named Henry Lawrence.

His second play, Mira—a "rite of Krishna for five actor-dancers" – explores what it means for a human being to become a saint through the story of Mirabai, the sixteen-century Rajput princess-poet. It premiered at the La Mama Theatre in 1970 to much critical acclaim. Clive Barnes of the New York Times wrote, "Remarkable in the way it combines Indian legend with the sophistication of Western total theater…Mira has the quality of a dream ritual." It was produced in Bombay by Alaque Padmsee and was called "a major artistic achievement of immense merit and supreme significance to the re-blossoming of theatre in India"

He wrote a third play also in his twenties. 9 Jakhoo Hill is set in the autumn of 1962 in Shimla. "During the autumn of discontent of a once-wealthy family [9 Jakhoo Hill] broods over better days…on the hold that mothers have over their sons…a family coming down in the world…remnants of the Raj, disillusionment with politics. Sixties? The script is here and now." It has been performed in major Indian cities.

In the midst of a corporate career in his thirties, Gurcharan Das also wrote a novel, A Fine Family, which follows the stories of several generations of a Punjabi family, beginning with the Partition. It was published by Penguin in 1990. The Hindu called it "a worthy addition to the body of fiction that deals with the anguish and bitter memories of one of the most sorrowful disasters in recorded history," and India Today said, "The canvas is broad and the scope enormous. But Das' success lies in making people ordinary without making them dull…A Fine Family shines because of its simplicity."

Gurcharan Das turned to non-fiction when he became a full-time writer in 1995 and began to write a regular column in the Times of India. He travelled for four months in 1995 and out these travels emerged a 20-page cover essay, 'A Million Reformers' about how the reforms were changing India. From this essay grew his first major non-fiction work, India Unbound, the story of the economic and social transformation of India from Independence to the global information age. Amartya Sen called it, "a wonderful book…a great mixture of memoir, economic analysis, social investigation, political scrutiny and managerial outlook thrown into an understanding of India." The New York Times wrote, "Something tremendous is happening in India, and Das, with his keen eye and often elegant prose, has his finger firmly on the pulse of the transformation." The book has been published in many languages and filmed by BBC,

India Unbound was followed in 2002 by a book of essays, The Elephant Paradigm: India wrestles with change. It recounted the "story of an ancient civilization's reawakening to the spirit and potential of its youth", arguing that "India may not roar like the Asian tigers, it will advance like a wise elephant, moving steadily but surely." A decade later, Gurcharan Das returned to the theme of India's rise, confessing wryly that 'India grows at night when the government sleeps'. In India Grows at Night: A liberal case for a strong state, he argued that India's is a story of private success and public failure and it is rising despite the state. In this book, which was rated as one of the best books of 2013 by London's Financial Times, he offers significant governance reforms so that 'India can grow during the day.'

Prosperity had, indeed, begun to spread in India, as India Unbound predicted, but so had corruption and Gurcharan Das turned to the ancient epic, Mahabharata, to understand role of dharma or 'doing the right thing' in our lives in The Difficulty of Being Good: On the subtle art of dharma. "It is one of the best things I have read about the contribution of great literature to ethical thought," said Martha Nussbaum.

Having written about artha and dharma, Gurcharan Das turned to the third aim of life in Kama: The Riddle of Desire, and discovered that if dharma is 'our duty to others', kama is a 'duty to ourselves'. The dilemma often is whether to betray the other or oneself. This fictional memoir narrates a philosophical journey "creating a sense of enchantment, using memory as a device to summon the many forms of desire that play upon the mind [thus] entering an imagined world of beauty."

Gurcharan Das is also general editor of a fifteen-volume series, The Story of Indian Business (Penguin), which "mines great ideas in business and economics that have shaped commerce in the bazaars and high seas of the Indian Ocean. Leading scholars examine historical texts, inscriptions and records and interpret them in a lively, sharp authoritative manner. Beginning with the ancient Arthashastra: The Science of Wealth, it narrates tales of trade over two thousand years, including the story of The East India Company: The World's Most Powerful Corporation, and The Marwaris."

== Books authored ==
- The Elephant Paradigm
- India Unbound
- The Dilemma of an Indian Liberal
- The Difficulty of Being Good

== Academic articles on Gurcharan Das ==
- Bhargava, Rajul. Ed. Indian Writing in English: The Last Decade. Jaipur: Rawat Publications, 2002.
- Das, Bijay Kumar. Postmodern Indian English Literature. 2003. New Delhi: Atlantic Publishers and Distributors, 2010.
- Critical Essays on Post-Colonial Literature. 1997. Rev. 2nd ed. New Delhi: Atlantic Publishers and Distributors, 2007.
- Dass, Veena Noble and R.K.Dhawan. Fiction of the Nineties. New Delhi: Prestige Books, 1994.
- Iyengar, Srinivasa K.R. Indian Writing in English. 1962. Rev. ed. 18th Rpt. New Delhi: Sterling Publishers. 2009.
- Kirpal, Viney. Ed. The Postmodern Indian English Novel: Interrogating the 1980s and 1990s. Bombay: Allied Publishers Ltd., 1996.
- Ed. The New Indian Novel in English: A Study of The 1980s. New Delhi: Allied Publishers Limited, 1990.
- Kulkarni, Vibhati Vasantrao, Gurcharan Das: A Writer of Globalized Indian Culture Indian Streams Research Journal, Volume 3, Issue 2, March 2013, ISSN 2230-7850
- Kumar, T. Vijay, Meenakshi Mukherjee, Harish Trivedi and C. Vijaysree. Ed. Focus India: Postcolonial Narratives of the Nation. New Delhi: Pencraft International, 2007.
- Mukherjee, Meenakshi. Realism And Reality: The Novel and Society in India. New Delhi: Oxford University Press. 1993.
- The Twice Born Fiction: Themes and Techniques of the Indian Novel in English. New
- Naik, M.K. 20th Century Indian English Fiction. New Delhi. Pencraft International, 2004
- A History of Indian English Literature. New Delhi: Sahitya Akademi, 1980.
- Naik, M.K. and Shyamala A. Narayan. Indian English Literature 1980 to 2000: A Critical Survey. Delhi: Pencraft International, 2001.
- Nanavati, U.M. and Prafulla C.Kar. Ed. Rethinking Indian English Literature. New Delhi: Pencraft International, 2000.
- Roy, Pinaki, 'Against Eurocentrism: A Postcolonial Re-reading of Gurcharan Das's Larins Sahib', in Unmasking Power: Subjectivity and Resistance in Indian Drama in English (eds. J. Sarkar and A. Bhattacharya), Guwahati: Papyrus, 2014, ISBN 978-93-81287-40-8, pp. 101–21.
- Rukhaiyar, U.S. and Amar Nath Prasad. Ed. Studies in Indian English Fiction and Poetry. New Delhi: Sarup & Sons, 2003.
- Shetty, Amrita. "Tuned to a Fine Pitch". Rev. of A Fine Family, by Gurcharan Das. Indian Review Of Books 9.9. (16 June 2000 - 15 July 2000): 30–31.
- V.K. Shrotriya, 'Review of Gurcharan Das, India Grows at Night', The NEHU Journal, Vol XI, No. 2, July 2013
- Shukla, Sheobhusan and Anu Shukla. Ed. Studies in Contemporary Literature: Indian English Novel in the 90s. New Delhi: Sarup and Sons, 2002.
- Valiyamattam, Rositta Joseph. "The Family and The Nation: Critiquing Gurcharan Das' A Fine Family" (The Quest -A Peer-Reviewed International Literary Journal, Silver Jubilee Issue, Vol.25.No.2., Dec 2011, pp. 94–102). ISSN 0971-2321
- "The Non-fiction of Gurcharan Das: Narrating the Nation in Post-colonial Times" (Indian English Prose and Poetry: New Perspectives – Proceedings of UGC Sponsored National Seminar, 6th and 7th Dec.2012, Dept. Of English, Midnapore College, West Bengal, Publ. by Amritalok Sahitya Parishad, Mar.2013, pp. 138–149). ISBN 81-89635-69-X.
- "A Nation Needs A Moral Core: Interview with Gurcharan Das" (The Quest - An International Literary Journal, Vol.27.No.1, June 2013, pp. 10–17). ISSN 0971-2321
- Valiyamattam, Rositta Joseph. "Confrontations with Neo-Colonialism in Indian English Novels of the 90s: Gurcharan Das, Rohinton Mistry and Arundhati Roy" in the anthology Postcolonial Approaches to Literature: Text, Context, Theory edited by Subashish Bhattacharjee, Saikat Guha and Mandika Sinha, North Bengal University, AuthorsPress, New Delhi, 2015, pp. 228 – 243. ISBN 978-93-5207-118-0.
- Personal and National Destinies in Independent India: A Study of Selected Indian English novels. Cambridge Scholars Publishing, UK, 2019

== See also ==
- List of Indian writers
