= Gopal Parajuli =

Nepalese poet and writer (born 1950)

- गोपाल पराजुली
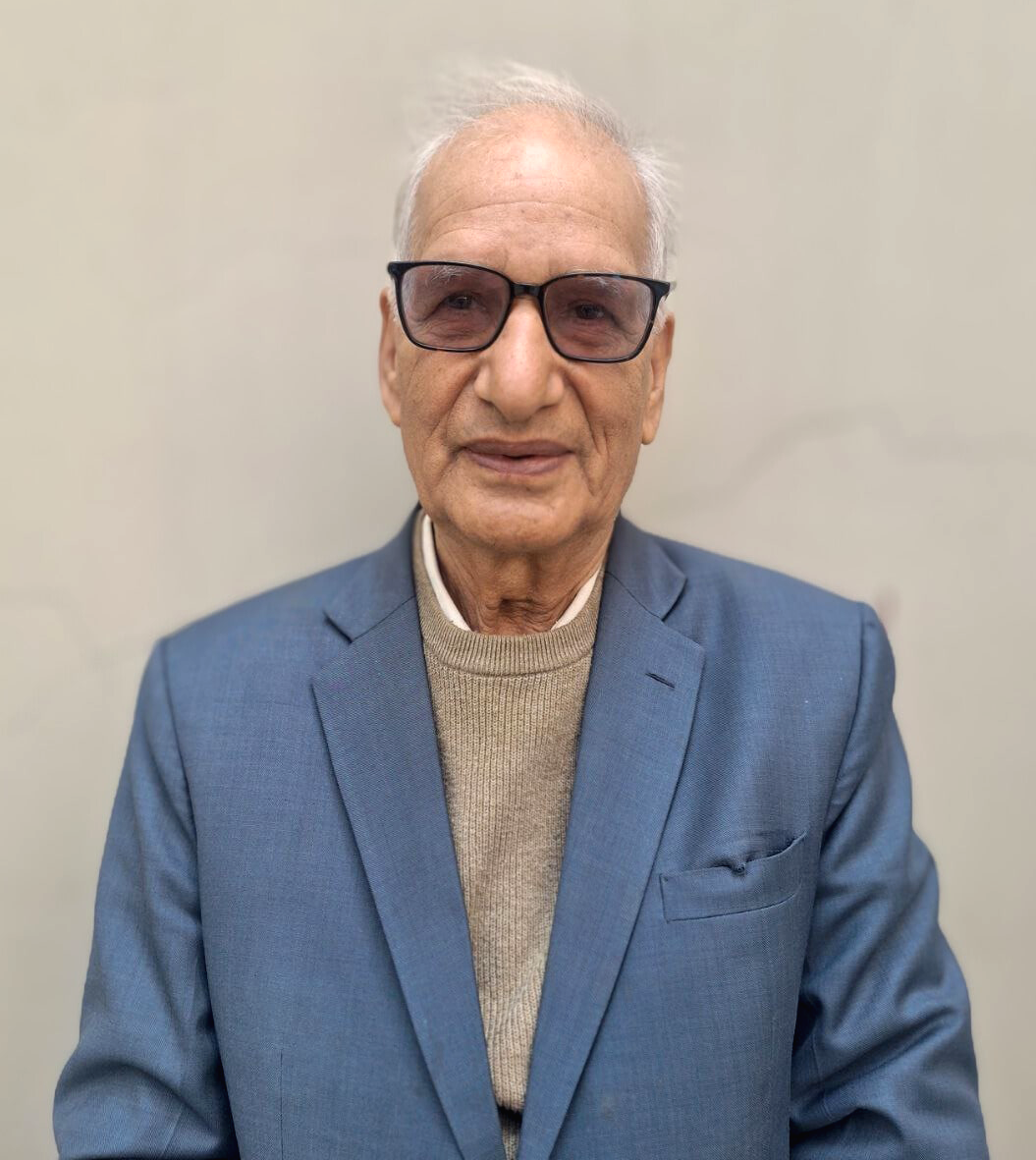
- Born: 1950 (age 75–76); Kathmandu, Nepal
- Occupations: Poet and writer
- Known for: Naya Ishwar Ko Ghoshana
- Spouse: Laxmi Adhikari Parajuli (m. 1986)
- Children: 5
- Parents: Thir Kumari Parajuli (Mother); Jivanath Parajuli (Father)
- Awards: Madan Puraskar
- Website: www.gopalparajuli.com.np

Gopal Parajuli is a Nepalese poet and writer. He won the Madan Puraskar prize with his epic Naya Ishwar Ko Ghoshana. He is known as a poet, short-story writer and playwright of post-modern and post-post-modern experimental vein.

== Career ==
Born in 1950, in Koteshwar, Kathmandu, Parajuli joined editorial desk of leading Nepali literary monthly journal, GARIMA, at Sajha Prakashan, a state-owned organization. Out of fifteen books to his credit, nine are epics. The epics are ‘The Mother-Figure’, ‘The Departure of Time’, ‘ Declaration of a New God’, ‘Proposal for a New World’, and ‘Letter of a Jailbird’. His other books include ‘The Two Extremes’ (a play), and ‘The Broken Sky’ (a collection of short stories). ‘Critical Discourses on Gopal Parajuli’ is a critical book on him published by Robertson publishing, California.

Recipient of the Madan Puraskar prize for his epic poem ‘Naya Ishwar Ko Ghoshana’ (Declaration of a New God) and a former boxer and soldier (Parajuli was a trainee of National Cadet Corps (1966–1967), where he was selected for second lieutenant but did not join the army). He has received awards, medals and felicitations of national and international honor. His new epic ‘A Soldier in Search of Peace’ has recently been published.

== Person life ==
His mother is Thir Kumari Parajuli and his father is Jivanath Parajuli, who hails from a farmer's family in Koteshwar, Kathmandu. The poet married Laxmi Adhikari (b.25 July 1969) in 1986. He has four daughters, Rakshya Parajuli, Dikshya Parajuli, Shaila Parajuli and Srija Parajuli, and a son, Sayuj Parajuli.

== See also ==
- Buddhi Sagar
- Geeta Tripathee
- Narayan Wagle
