= India Unbound =

Indian English book

India Unbound: From Independence to Global Information Age
- Author: Gurcharan Das
- Cover artist: Dinesh Khanna
- Language: English
- Subject: Economics
- Genre: Non-fiction
- Publisher: Penguin Books India
- Publication date: 1 April 2000
- Publication place: India
- Media type: Paperback
- Pages: 419 (paperback edition)
- ISBN: 978-0-14-306301-8 (Paperback)
- Website: penguin.co.in/book/india-unbound/

India Unbound: From Independence to Global Information Age is a 2000 non-fiction book by Gurcharan Das. It is an account of India's economic journey after its Independence in 1947.

== Overview ==
India Unbound is mainly about the transformation of India from birth of the writer in (1942) to 1999. The author majorly speaks about the Indian politics and the economy of India. He categorizes the complete timeline from 1942 to 1999 in three major sections: 'Spring of Hope (1942–1965)', 'the Lost Generation (1966–1991)' and 'Rebirth of Dream (1991–1999)' and tell various stories (memoirs) and the historical facts of that time. The book is a great mixture of memoir, economic analysis, social investigation, political scrutiny and managerial outlook being thrown into the understanding of India. It begins shortly before independence and continues until the new millennium. As other authors cherish the revolution that began with independence in 1947, Gurcharan Das does not find full cause for jubilation until 1991, when India unleashed a series of economic reforms, the start of an "economic revolution" that he believes "may well be more important than the political revolution."

The book starts with a brief history of 18th and 19th century India. Gurucharan Das starts with the augmentation of the railways in India, which was presumed to usher India into the Industrial Revolution. The book also points to the factors which led to the decline in the Indian economy under the British Raj.

The ‘Spring of Hope’ (1942–1965) describes the period in Indian history when it embarks upon as an independent country. The post independence economic policy followed the first Prime Minister of India Jawaharlal Nehru is socialist in nature which gives all the control over the industry to the public sector. Nehru was ably supported by some of the best economists from across India. He sets up a mixed economy which is a middle path between democratic rights followed by the Western countries and socialist ideology of the Soviet world.

The 'Lost Generation' (1966–1991) refers to the phase of Indian Polity and economy which saw fading of the Indian dream. The economic policies followed by Indira Gandhi with the advice of her trusted economic advisers led India in to a very slow growth rate. The book cites an irony when it states that the 'Garibi Hatao' policies followed by Mrs. Indira Gandhi were actually working counter-productively and throwing millions of Indians further into poverty rather than alleviating their plight. The author marks the declaration of 'Emergency' as the lowest point of Indian Polity. Gurucharan Das gives a resounding account of his personal tryst with the Indian bureaucratic system prevailing at that time. He gives the account of incompetency spread in the Indian set-up which was choking the country’s economy to the death and License Raj which was the greatest hurdle to the growth of India.

== See also ==
- The Difficulty of Being Good
- The Elephant Paradigm
- The Dilemma of an Indian Liberal
