= Hisila Yami =

Nepalese politician (born 1959)

- हिसिला यमी
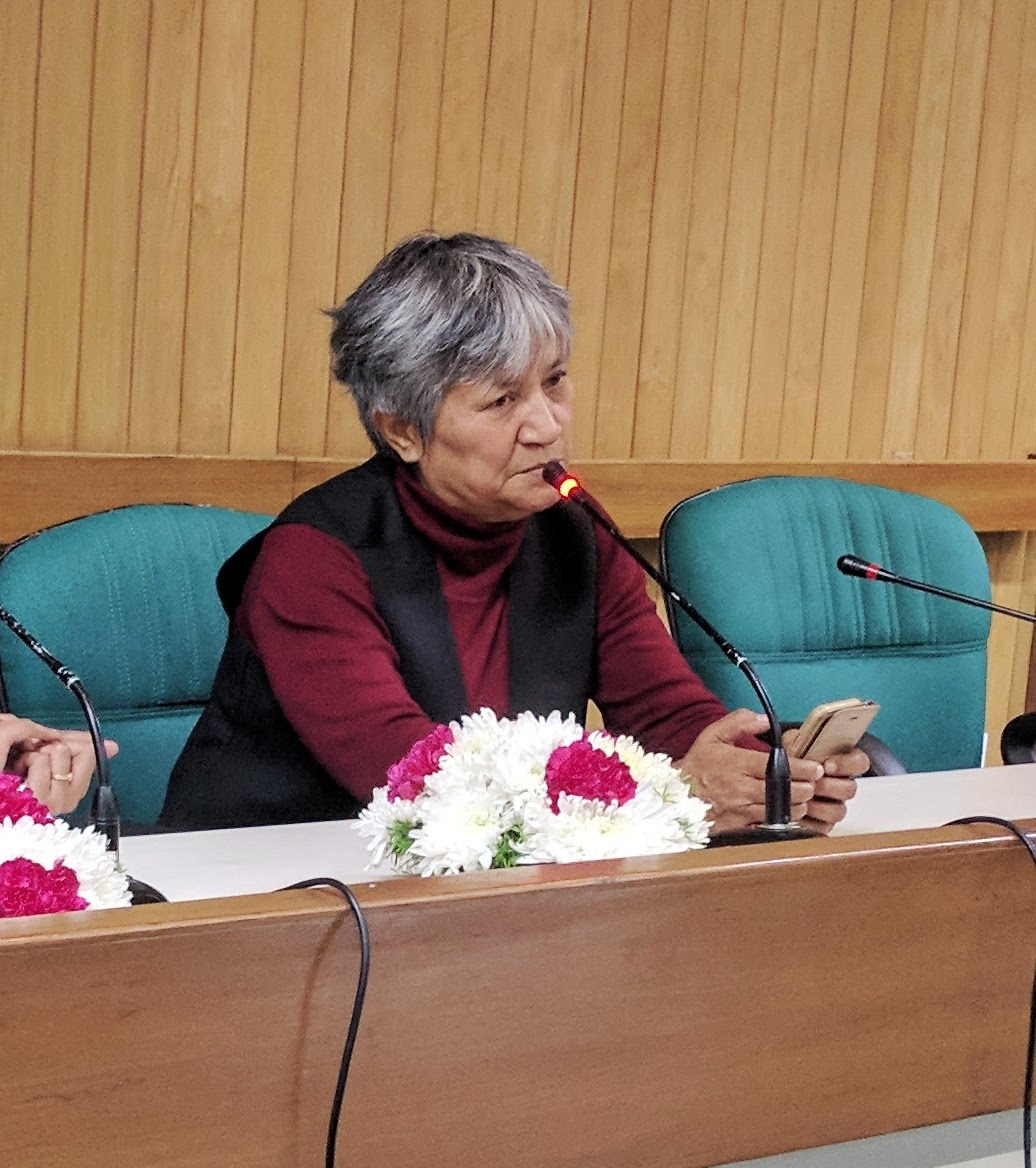
- Hisila Yami at the screening of Daughter of Nepal, a film about her daughter Manushi Bhattarai at India Habitat Center in New Delhi.

Deputy chairman of Nepal Socialist Party
- Incumbent
- Assumed office 28 July 2022
- Preceded by: Position established

Personal details
- Born: 25 June 1959 (age 67) Kathmandu
- Party: Pragatisheel Loktantrik Party
- Other political affiliations: CPN (Maoist) (2001 - 2015); Naya Shakti Party, Nepal (2016 - 2019); Samajbadi Party, Nepal
- Spouse: Baburam Bhattarai
- Children: 1
- Parents: Dharma Ratna Yami (father); Heera Devi Kansakar (mother)
- Education: M. Arch.
- Alma mater: University of Newcastle upon Tyne
- Occupation: Politician, architect
- Nickname: Parvati (nom de guerre)

Hisila Yami (Nepali: हिसिला यमी) (born 25 June 1959), also known by her nom de guerre Parvati, is a Nepalese politician belonging to Pragatisheel Loktantrik Party and architect. She was a deputy chairman of Nepal Socialist Party and a former president of the All Nepal Women's Association (Revolutionary).

== Early life and education ==
Her father Dharma Ratna Yami was a Nepalese social activist, author and government deputy minister.

Yami graduated from the School of Planning and Architecture in Delhi, India, in 1982. She completed her M. Arch. from the University of Newcastle upon Tyne, UK in 1995.

== Activism ==
During the 1990 uprising against the panchayat regime, Yami was one of the most high-profile women leaders in the protests. She has been the General Secretary of All India Nepalese Students' Association, 1981-1982. She was a lecturer at Institute of Engineering, Pulchowk Campus from 1983 to 1996. In 1995 she became the President of the All Nepal Women's Association (Revolutionary) and served a two-year term. She went underground in 1996 after the inception of the Communist Party of Nepal (Maoist)-led People's War. Since 2001, she has been a Central Committee Member of CPN (Maoist) and has worked in the International Department, among others, of the organization.

== Political career ==
She made her first public appearance on 18 June 2003, during the then ongoing peace negotiations between the government and the Maoists.

In early 2005 she was, along with Baburam Bhattarai and Dina Nath Sharma, demoted by the party leadership. In July she was reinstated into the Central Committee.

On 1 April 2007 Hisila Yami joined the interim government of Nepal as Minister of Physical Planning and Works. Following a Maoist boycott of the government from September to December 2007, Yami was again sworn in as Minister of Physical Planning on 31 December 2007. Following her victory in the Constituent Assembly elections, 2008, from Kathmandu constituency no. 7, she became a member of the Constituent Assembly. She joined the CPN (Maoist) led government in September as Minister for Tourism and Civil Aviation.

In 2015, Yami and Bhattarai split from CPN (Maoist). In 2016, they founded Naya Shakti Party. On May 9, 2019, Naya Shakti, united with Federal Socialist Forum to found Samajbadi Party, Nepal. Later, Samajbadi Party united with Rastriya Janata Party to form Janata Samajbadi Party. As for 2020, Yami is part of Janata Samajbadi Party.

== Personal life ==
Yami is married to fellow Maoist leader Baburam Bhattarai. They have a daughter.

== Bibliography ==
- Adha Akash Adha Dharti, ed. by Hisila Yami, Sita Sharma, Durga Neupane, Prerana Mahila Parivar, 1991
- Adhikar: Demystification of Law for Nepali Women, Hisila Yami, Sandhya Basnet Bhatta, Tulsi Bhatta, Prerana Mahila Parivar, 1993
- Yami, Hisila and Bhattarai, Baburam, Marxbad ra mahila mukti. Kathmandu: Utprerak Prakashan, 2000.
- Hisila Yami (comrade Parvati) People's War and Women's Liberation in Nepal – Purvaiya Prakashan, Raipur, Chhattishgarth, India 2006 – Second Edition, Janadhwani Publication, 2007
- Hisila: from Revolutionary to First Lady - Penguin India, 2021

== See also ==
- Nepal Socialist Party
