= Maya Thakuri =

Nepali writer (born 1946)

- माया ठकुरी
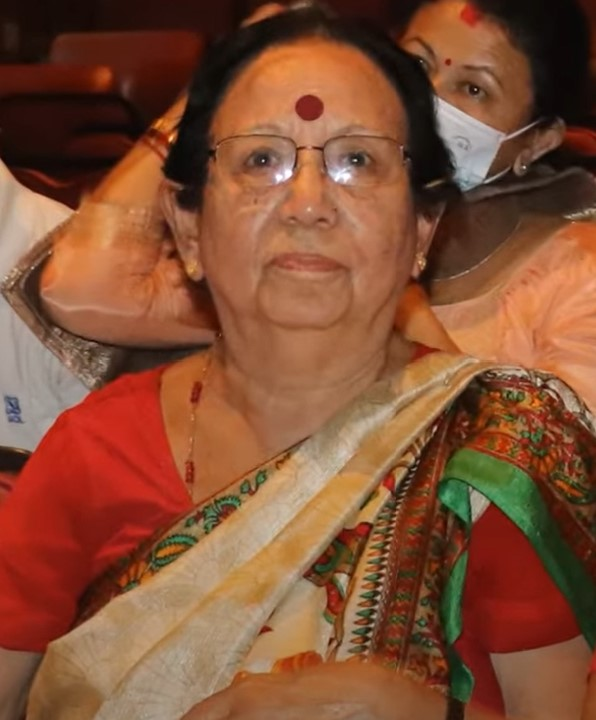
- Thakuri at Madan Puraskar 2078 ceremony (2022)
- Born: 2 July 1946 (age 79); Lucknow, India
- Occupation: Writer
- Notable work: Priyambada
- Spouse: Damodar Sharma

Maya Thakuri (born 2 July 1946) is a Nepali writer. She has published eight anthologies of short stories. Her stories have been translated into English, Hindi, Bengali, Tamil, and are a part of the curriculum in various universities in India and Nepal. She is also a member of Nepal Academy.

== Biography ==
She was born on 2 July 1946 in Lucknow, India. She never received formal education and could not read or write until the age of 15. She learnt to read and write on her own. In 1974, she moved permanently to Kathmandu with her husband, Damodar Sharma.

== Notable works ==
Thakuri's stories focus on prejudices in women's lives. Her most renowned works are:

- Ama Januhos
- Najureko Jodhi - 1974, Sajha Publications
- Of a Lesser God
- Priyambada
