= Yuyutsu Sharma =

Nepalese poet

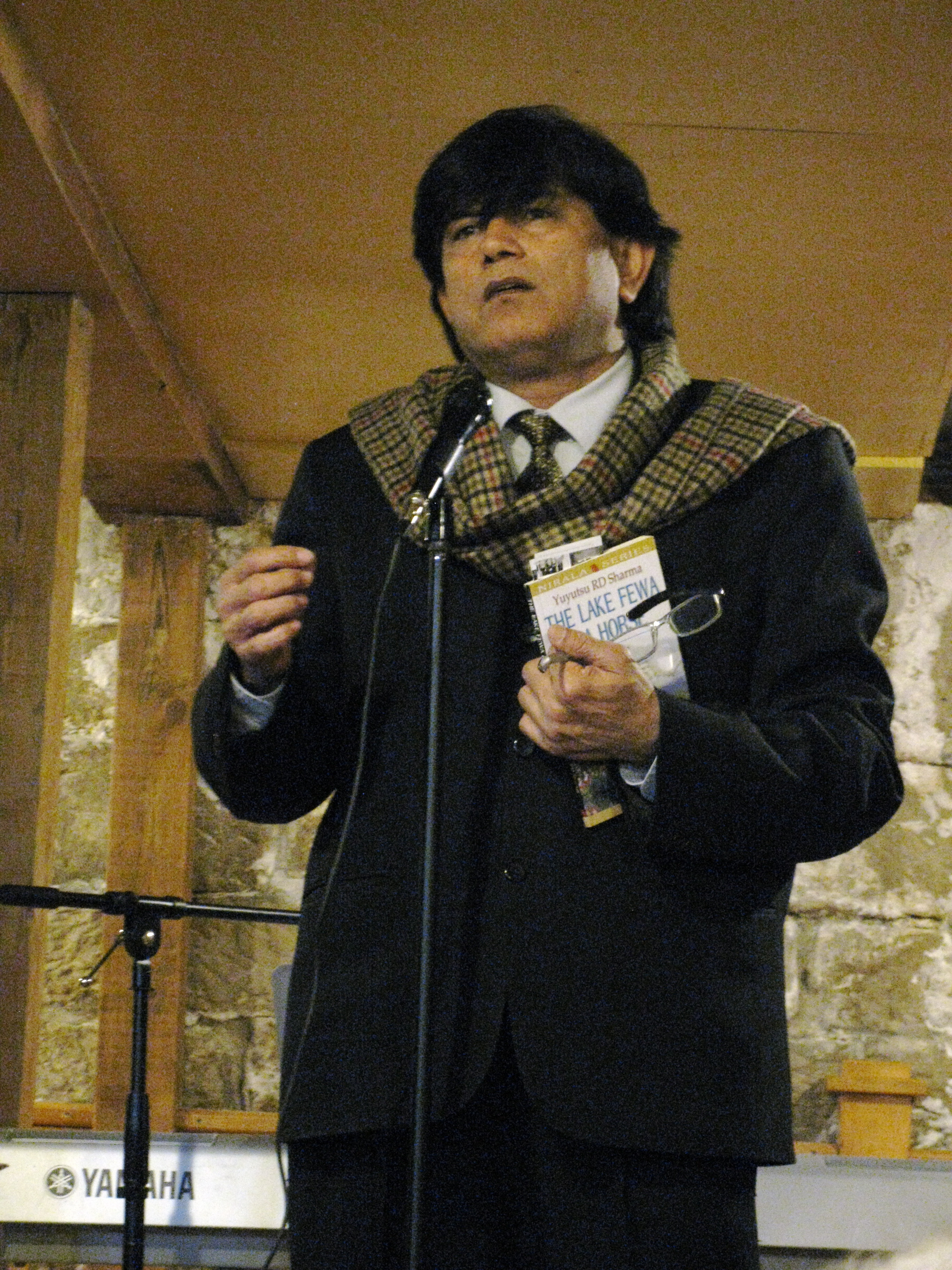
- Sharma, photographed at a poetry reading in Elyria, Ohio
- Born: January 5, 1960 (age 66); Nakodar, Punjab, India
- Education: University of Rajasthan, Tribhuvan University
- Occupation: Poet editor writer translator
- Writing career
- Genres: Indian poetry, Nepali poetry
- Website: yuyutsusharma.com

Yuyutsu Ram Dass Sharma (Nepali: युयुत्सु शर्मा; born January 5, 1960) is a Nepalese-Indian poet and journalist. He was born at Nakodar, Punjab and moved to Nepal at an early age. He writes in English and Nepali.

== Life and career ==
Sharma received his early education first at DAV College, Nakodar, Punjab, and later at Baring Union Christian College, Batala and University of Rajasthan. While at Rajasthan, Sharma met American poet David Ray while assisting Ray on an issue of New Letters. Ray introduced Sharma to the work of prominent American poets such as William Carlos Williams and Allen Ginsberg, and encouraged Sharma to publish his own work. Sharma has called meeting Ray a "watershed" moment in his life.

Yuyutsu remained active in the literary circles of Rajasthan and acted in plays by Shakespeare, Bertolt Brecht, Harold Pinter, and Edward Albee. Later he taught at various campuses of Punjab University, Chandigarh and Tribhuwan University, Kathmandu.

He met German Photographer Andreas Stimm in 2004 and his collaboration with Stimm resulted in three books of picture/poetry: Nepal Trilogy:Photographs and Poetry on Annapurna, Everest, Helambu & Langtang.

In 2006, he published The Lake Fewa and a Horse and later in 2008, Annapurna Poems, Selected and New. According to a review of Annapurna Poems by critic Jim Feast, Sharma operates "at the edge of a belief system or way of living that has fallen short", a position from which great poetry emerges according to essayist and American poet laureate Allen Tate.

His 2009 poetry collection Space Cake features artwork by Henry Avignon. Reminiscent of traditions in beat poetry, it chronicles his travels in Europe and America, including an episode in Amsterdam where he accidentally consumes a cannabis edible, from which the collection gets its title.

In 2016 he published Quaking Cantos, a collection inspired by the 2015 Nepal earthquakes featuring Sharma's poetry and photographs by Prasant Shrestha. In the Kathmandu Tribune, Arun Budhathoki wrote that it "immortalized the tragic event and captured the bitter memories of the Himalayan on a grand scale". Andrea Dawn Bryant called it "stunningly heart-wrenching, albeit healing".

In 2020 he published Panaharu Khali Chhan, a collection of poems in Nepali, many translated from English. Critic Bibek Adhikari wrote that "reading Sharma in English is a delightful experience; reading him in Nepali, a somewhat bewildering and disconcerting one".

Sharma is the editor of Pratik, A Quarterly Magazine of Contemporary Writing. As of 2020 he was a visiting poet at Columbia University. He is the recipient of fellowships and grants from The Rockefeller Foundation, Ireland Literature Exchange, Trubar Foundation, Slovenia, The Institute for the Translation of Hebrew Literature and The Foundation for the Production and Translation of Dutch Literature.

== Poetry ==
- The Alchemy of Nine Smiles: Nine Long Poems, Red River, New Delhi, 2024
- Lost Horoscope: New Poems , Nirala, New Delhi, 2023
- The Second Buddha Walk: Inspired by the Second Buddha: Master of Time Exhibit at Rubin Museum, New York , Nirala, New Delhi, 2018
- Quaking Cantos: Nepal Earthquake Poems , Nirala, New Delhi, 2016
- A Blizzard in my Bones: New York Poems, Nirala, New Delhi, 2016
- Nine New York Poems: A Prelude to‘A Blizzard in my Bones: New York Poems’, Nirala, New Delhi, 2014
- Milarepa's Bones, Helambu:33 New Poems, Nirala, New Delhi, 2012
- The Nepal Trilogy I-III Photographs and Poetry about the Nepal areas of Annapurna, Everest, Helambu & Langtang, www.Nepal-Trilogy.de,·www.Nepal-Trilogie.de) (english-deutsch, Epsilonmedia, Karlsruhe Germany, 2010
- www.AroundAnnapurna.de: A photographic and Poetic Journey around Annapurnas, Nepal, Epsilonmedia, Karlsruhe Germany
- www.WayToEverest.de:A photographic and Poetic Journey to the Foot of Everest, Epsilonmedia, Karlsruhe Germany, 2006
- Annapurna Poems, Nirala, New Delhi, 2008
- Everest Failures, White Lotus Book Shop, Kathmandu 2008
- Space Cake Amsterdam and other Poems from Europe and America, Howling Dog Press, Colorado, 2009
- The Lake Fewa and a Horse, Poems New, Nirala, New Delhi, 2005, 2009
- Poèmes de l'Himalaya, trans. by Nicole Barrière and Camille Bloomfield, L'Harmattan, Paris, 2009
- Poemas De Los Himalayas: Bilingual Spanish/English Poetry Collection, Translated into Spanish with an Introduction by Veronica Aranda, 2010, Cosmopoeticia, Cordoba, Spain
- Some Female Yeti & other Poems, Nirala, New Delhi, 1995
- Hunger of our Huddled Huts & other Poems, Nirala, New Delhi, 1989, 2011
- A Prayer in Daylight, Poems, Nirala, Jaipur, 1984

IN TRANSLATION

- Poemas De Los Himalayas: Bilingual Spanish/English Poetry Collection, Translated into Spanish with an Introduction by Veronica Aranda , 2010, Cosmopoeticia, Cordoba, Spain
- Poèmes de l'Himalaya, trans. by Nicole Barrière and Camille Bloomfield, L'Harmattan, Paris, 2009
- Jezero Fewa & Konj Translated from the Slovene by Evald Flisar, Sodobnost International, Ljubljana, Slovenia 2008
- Pret Re Seni Spevi: Pesmi iz potresnega Nepala, Translated from the Slovene by Barbara Pogačnik, Sodobnost International, Ljubljana, Slovenia, 2018

== Non-fiction ==
- Annapurnas and Stains of Blood (Travelogue), Nirala, New Delhi, 2010

== Translations ==
- Dying in Rajasthan, 1985, Short Stories by Ramanand Rathi, (Translated from the Hindi), Nirala, New Delhi
- Folk Tales of Sherpa & Yeti, 2008, Shiva Dhakal (Translated from the Nepali), Nirala, New Delhi
- Roaring Recitals: Five Nepali Poets, (Gopal Prasad Rimal, Bhupi Sherchan & Others) (Translated from the Nepali), Nirala, New Delhi
- Kathmandu: Poems Selected and New (An English/Nepali Bilingual Edition), Cathal O’ Searcaigh, Translated from the Gaelic by Seamus Heaney, John Montague, and others; Translated into the Nepali, Nirala, New Delhi
- Baghdad, February 1991, A Bilingual Nepali /English Edition, Ronny Someck, Translated into Nepali by Yuyutsu RD Sharma, Nirala Publications, New Delhi, 2010
- Mother’s Hand: Selected Poems — A Bilingual English/Nepali Anthology by Jidi Majai, Translated into Nepali by Yuyutsu RD Sharma, Nirala Publications, New Delhi, 2020
- I Choose to Cry and Love you, Poems by Yang Qingxiang, Translated into Nepali by Yuyutsu Sharma, White Lotus Book Shop/ Renmin University, 2022
- Ek Asadharan Antarvarta An Extraordinary Interview), Stories by Lao Ma, Translated into Nepali by Yuyutsu Sharma, White Lotus Book Shop, Kathmandu/ Renmin University, Beijing University, 2021

== Edited ==
- Elysium in the Halls of Hell, 1991, Poems about India by David Ray, Nirala, New Delhi,
- Dispossessed Nests: The 1984 Poems, 1986, by Jayanta Mahapatra, Nirala, New Delhi,
- Bagar: An Asian Poetry Special Number, (1989–90) Kathmandu, Nepal
- General Editor, Nirala Series (Since 1989)
- Guest Editor, Omega, Special Issue on Nepali Poetry (www.howlingdogpress.com) with Michael Annis, Howling Dog Press
- Pratik: A Magazine of Contemporary Writing, since 1990
- Pratik's Special Dutch issue (2007 Spring Issue) with Harry Zevenbergen as Guest Editor
- Pratik's Special British issue (2007 Summer-Fall Issue) with Pascale Petit as Guest Editor
- Ten: The New Indian Poets; Edited with Jayanta Mahapatra, Nirala Publications, New Delhi, 2013
- Drunken Boat's Special Nepal Folio, Himalayan Arts, 2017
