= British Council Nepal =

The British Council Nepal is the UK's international organisation for cultural relations in Nepal. The head office is located in Lazimpat, Kathmandu. The organisation is basically focused on promoting English language and arranging English language tests (IELTS) in Nepal. The organisation was started in 1959 by establishing a public library in Kantipath; the library has been discontinued.

== Budget ==
The budget of the council to operate in Nepal is as follows.

- April 2016 - March 2017 £1,035,375
- April 2017 - March 2018 £804,058
- April 2018 - March 2019 £852,207
- April 2019 - March 2020 £1,303,098

== Operation ==
Besides the English language, the council is also involved in various social and educational activities.

- A four-year program (2017 to 2021) named Dakchyata was started in coordination with the Council for Technical Education and Vocational Training (CTEVT). The aim of this program was to produce human resource by combining the Agriculture, Tourism and Construction sector.

== Controversy ==
In January 2020, the organization was dragged into controversy for tax evasions. A complaint was filled in the Nepal parliament stating that the council has been operating for years without registering with the government and without paying any taxes.
