= Manjushree Thapa =

Nepalese–born Canadian writer (born 1968)

- मञ्जुश्री थापा
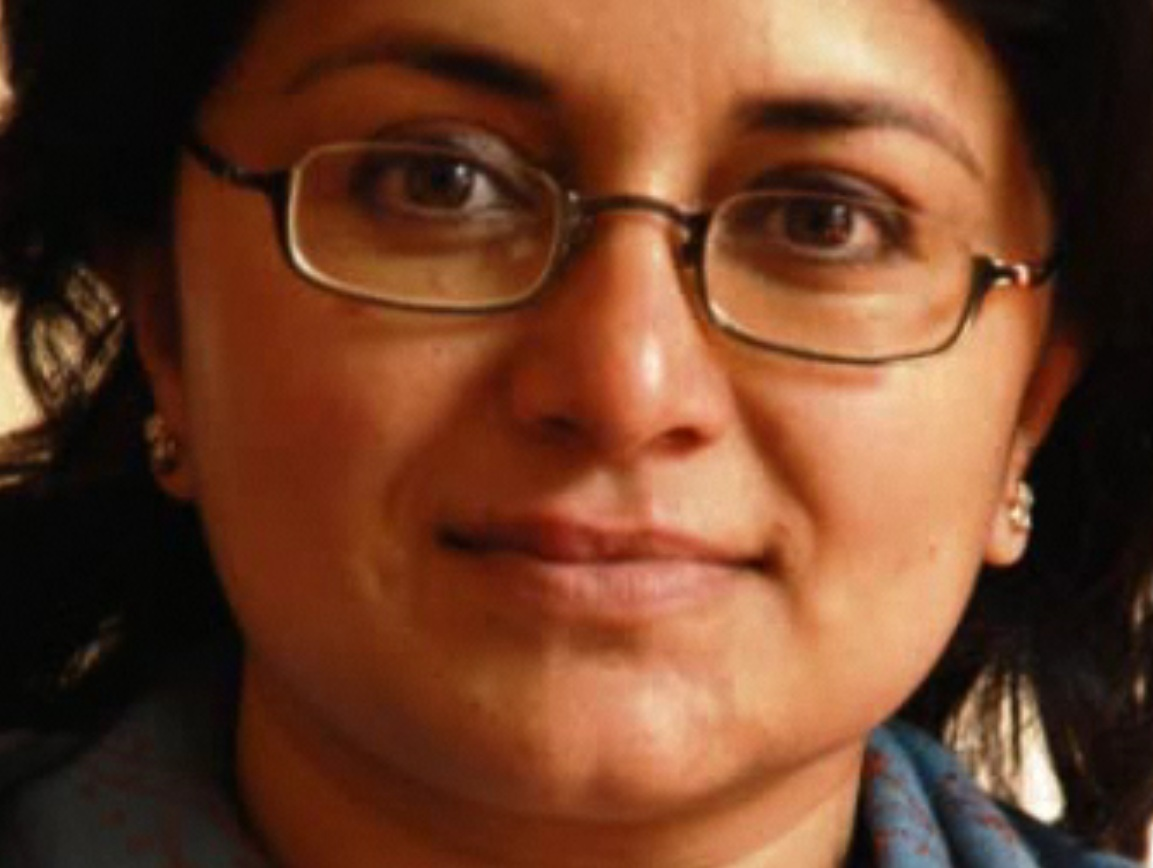
- Born: 1968 (age 57–58); Kathmandu, Nepal
- Education: University of Washington
- Occupation: Writer
- Years active: 1989–present
- Notable work: Forget Kathmandu (2005) The Tutor of History (2001)
- Parents: Bhekh Bahadur Thapa (father); Rita Thapa (mother)
- Relatives: Bhaskar Thapa (brother); Tejshree Thapa (sister)
- Website: www.manjushreethapa.com

Manjushree Thapa (born 1968 in Kathmandu) is a Nepalese–born Canadian essayist, fiction writer, translator and editor. She is one of the first English writers of Nepali descent to be published internationally. Forget Kathmandu and The Tutor of History are some of her most well-known works.

== Biography ==
Manjushree Thapa was born in 1968 in Kathmandu to former Foreign Minister and Nepal Rastra Bank governor Bhekh Bahadur Thapa and public health expert Dr. Rita Thapa. She grew up in Nepal, Canada and in United States. She began to write upon completing her BFA in photography at the Rhode Island School of Design. Her first book was Mustang Bhot in Fragments (1992). In 2001 she published the novel The Tutor of History, which she had begun as her MFA thesis in the creative writing program at the University of Washington in Seattle, which she attended as a Fulbright scholar. Her best known book is Forget Kathmandu: An Elegy for Democracy (2005), published just weeks before the royal coup in Nepal on 1 February 2005. The book was shortlisted for the Lettre Ulysses Award in 2006.

After the publication of the book, Thapa left the country to live in Canada. In 2007, she published a short story collection, Tilled Earth. In 2009 she published a biography of a Nepali environmentalist, A Boy from Siklis: The Life and Times of Chandra Gurung. The following year, she published a novel, Seasons of Flight. In 2011, she published a nonfiction collection, The Lives We Have Lost: Essays and Opinions on Nepal. Her latest book, published in South Asia in 2016, is a novel, All Of Us in Our Own Lives. She has also contributed op-eds to the New York Times. Her translation of Indra Bahadur Rai's There's a Carnival Today was conducted under the 2017 PEN America Heim Translation Grant.

== Bibliography ==
Fiction

- The Tutor of History (2001)
- Tilled Earth (2007)
- Seasons of Flight (2010)
- All Of Us in Our Own Lives (2016)

Non-Fiction

- Mustang Bhot in Fragments (1992)
- Forget Kathmandu: An Elegy for Democracy (2005)
- A Boy from Siklis (2009)
- The Lives We Have Lost (2012)

Translation

- A Leaf in a Begging Bowl by Ramesh Vikal (2000)
- The Country is Yours (2009)
- There's a Carnival Today by Indra Bahadur Rai (2017)

== See also ==
- Nepali literature
- Canadian literature
- List of Nepali translators
