= Forget Kathmandu =

2005 book by Manjushree Thapa

Forget Kathmandu: An Elegy for Democracy
- First Edition
- Author: Manjushree Thapa
- Language: English
- Genre: Historical, Political
- Published: 2005
- Publisher: Penguin Books
- Publication date: 2005
- Publication place: Nepal
- Media type: Print (Paperback)
- Pages: 260
- ISBN: 9780670058129
- Preceded by: The Tutor of History
- Followed by: Tilled Earth

Forget Kathmandu: An Elegy for Democracy is a historical book by Manjushree Thapa. The book was published in 2005 by Penguin Books. It is the third book of the writer who had previously published Mustang Bhot in Fragments in 1992 and The Tutor of History in 2001. Thapa is one of the first mainstream English writers from Nepal.

== Synopsis ==
The book covers several issues in the political and historical scenarios of Nepal. The book covers the ten year long Nepalese civil war and the Royal massacre. Thapa worked as a journalist during the Maoist insurgency in Nepal. The book records her experience, reportage and analysis of the various events that occurred in the last 10 years.

== Reception ==
Th book received positive responses from the critics and is Thapa's one the most popular work. Sam Miler called the book as "intelligent and challenging and deserves to be widely read" in his review for India Today. Elvira Gardner praised the style of Thapa as "innovative" in their review for the journal European Bulletin for Himalayan Research.

== Translations ==
The Italian translation of the book was published as Forget Kathmandu in 2006 translated by Gioia Guerzoni. The book was translated into Finnish as Unohda Kathmandu in 2008 by Erkki and Leena Vihtosella.

== See also ==
- Arresting God in Kathmandu
- The Tutor of History
- Palpasa Café
