= The Nepal Nexus =

2019 Nepalese non-fiction book

- Cover page of the 1st Edition
- Author: Sudheer Sharma
- Translator: Sanjay Dhakal
- Language: English
- Subject: An Inside Account of the Maoists, the Durbar and New Delhi
- Genre: Political
- Publisher: Penguin Viking
- Publication date: October 3, 2019
- Publication place: Nepal
- Media type: Print (Hardcover)
- Pages: 520
- ISBN: 9780670089307
- Preceded by: Prayogshala
- Website: Official site

The Nepal Nexus: An Inside Account of the Maoists, the Durbar and New Delhi is a non-fiction, historical and political book by journalist Sudheer Sharma. It was published on October 3, 2019 by Penguin Viking. This book is a translated and updated version of the author's best-selling Nepali book Prayogshala which was published in 2013. The book deals with different political events that occurred in Nepal in last two decades. While Prayogshala only chronicled the events till 2013, this book contains events that have happened after 2013. The book was translated from Nepali by Sanjay Dhakal.

== Background ==
Cover of Nepali edition

Sharma worked as a war reporter during Nepalese Civil War. He presents various changes that has occurred in Nepal such as the Maoist revolt in Nepal, the royal massacre, the state of emergency, the royal coup by Gyanendra Shah, the people's movement, the establishment of Nepal as a republic, the Madhesh uprising, the Constituent Assembly, federalism, the promulgation of the new Constitution in 2015 and 2015 Nepal blockade. The book also highlights the key people and organizations associated with the major events in the Nepal. The political dynamics between (Royal) Nepal Army, Maoists, Nepal Police, the monarchy (Durbar) and India is also analyzed.

== Reception ==
Kallol Bhattacherjee of The Hindu reviewed the book as a "must-read to understand India-Nepal ties".

== See also ==
- Unleashing Nepal
- All Roads Lead North
