= Samrat Upadhyay =

Nepalese-American writer (born 1964)

- सम्राट उपाध्यायl
- Born: 1964 (age 61–62); Kathmandu, Nepal
- Occupations: Professor at Indiana University, writer
- Notable work: First Nepalese writer published from west Arresting God in Kathmandu
- Children: Shay Upadhyay
- Awards: Whiting Award, 2001
- Website: samratupadhyay.com

Samrat Upadhyay (Nepali: सम्राट उपाध्याय, born 1964) is a Nepalese born American writer who writes in English. Upadhyay is a professor of creative writing and has previously served as the director of the Creative Writing Program at Indiana University Bloomington. He is the first Nepali-born fiction writer writing in English to be published in the West. He was born and raised in Kathmandu, Nepal, and came to the United States in 1984 at the age of twenty-one. He lives with his wife and daughter in Bloomington, Indiana.

In 2001, Upadhyay won a Whiting Award for fiction. He was an English professor at Baldwin-Wallace College in Berea, Ohio before moving to Indiana in 2003.

His books specially portray the current situation in Nepal, which Upadhyay views largely through the lens of contemporary American realist fiction. According to the San Francisco Chronicle, Upadhyay is "like a Buddhist Chekhov."

== Selected texts ==
=== Arresting God in Kathmandu (2001) ===
First published by Houghton Mifflin Company in 2001, Arresting God in Kathmandu is Upadhyay's first book. It is a collection of nine short stories. With Arresting God in Kathmandu Upadhyay won a Whiting Award.

==== Short stories ====
1. The Good Shopkeeper
2. The Cooking Poet
3. Deepak Misra's Secretary
4. The Limping Bride
5. During the Festival
6. The Room Next Door
7. The Man with Long Hair
8. This World
9. A Great Man's House

=== The Guru of Love (2003) ===
First published by Houghton Mifflin Company in 2003, The Guru of Love is Upadhyay's second book and first full-length novel. The Guru of Love was a New York Times Notable Book of the Year 2003.

It is not the basis for the 2008 Mike Myers film The Love Guru.

=== The Royal Ghosts (2006) ===
First published by Houghton Mifflin Company in 2006, The Royal Ghosts is Upadhyay's third book, a collection of nine short stories.

==== Short stories ====
1. A Refuge
2. The Wedding Hero
3. The Third Stage
4. Supreme Pronouncements
5. The Weight of a Gun
6. Chintamani's Women
7. Father, Daughter
8. A Servant in the City
9. The Royal Ghosts

=== Buddha's Orphans (2010) ===
Published by Houghton Mifflin in 2010, Buddha's Orphans is Upadhyay's fourth book and second novel. Using Nepal's political upheavals of the past century as a backdrop, it tells the story of an orphan boy, Raja, and the girl he is fated to love, Nilu, a daughter of privilege. Their love story scandalizes both families and takes readers through time and across the globe, through the loss of and search for children, and through several generations, hinting that perhaps old bends can, in fact, be righted in future branches of a family tree.

== Awards ==
Awards for Upadhyay's writing
Year	Title	Award	Result	Ref.
2004	The Guru of Love	Kiriyama Prize for Fiction	Finalist	
2007	The Royal Ghosts	Society of Midland Authors Award for Adult Fiction	Winner	
2012	Buddha's Orphans	DSC Prize for South Asian Literature	Longlist	
2018	Mad Country	Aspen Words Literary Prize	Shortlist	
2015	The City Son	PEN Open Book Award	Shortlist	

== Publications ==
- Arresting God in Kathmandu (2001)
- The Guru of Love (2004)
- The Royal Ghosts (2006)
- Buddha's Orphans (2010)
- The City Son (2014)
- Mad Country (2017)
- Darkmotherland (2025)
