= Arresting God in Kathmandu =

2001 book by Samrat Upadhyay

- Cover art for original 2001 publication
- Author: Samrat Upadhyay
- Language: English
- Genre: Fiction
- Publisher: Houghton Mifflin Harcourt
- Publication date: 2001 AD (2057 BS)
- Publication place: United States
- Media type: Hardcover
- Pages: 191
- Awards: Whiting Writers' Award for Fiction, 2001
- ISBN: 9780618043712

Arresting God in Kathmandu is the debut book by Nepali-American author Samrat Upadhyay. Published in 2001, Arresting God in Kathmandu was awarded the Whiting Writers' Award for fiction. The book marks the first time a Nepali writer writing in English has been published in the West.

== Synopsis ==
It is a collection of nine short stories that provide a glimpse into everyday life in Kathmandu, Nepal. The stories included in the books are:

1. The Good Shopkeeper
2. The Cooking Poet
3. Deepak Misra's Secretary
4. The Limping Bride
5. During the Festival
6. The Room Next Door
7. The Man with Long Hair
8. This World
9. A Great Man's House

== Reception ==
Publishers Weekly calls Upadhyay's writing "assured and simple", concluding that "Upadhyay anchors small yet potent epiphanies in a place called Kathmandu, and quietly calls it home." On the other hand, Kirkus Reviews called the book a collection of "diverting if sometimes lukewarm tales."
