= Koirala =

Koirala कोइराला
- Pronunciation: /koi̯ˈraːlaː/
- Languages: Nepali, Doteli, Sanskrit, Kumaoni, Garhwali, Hindi, Burmese, Dzongkha

Origin
- Language: Khas
- Meaning: Toponym of Koirali

Other names
- Cognates: Aryal, Dahal, Dhakal, Ghimire, Pokhrel,
- Derivative: Koirala Khatri (K.C.)
- See also: Adhikari, Bhattarai, Paudel, Subedi

Koirala (Nepali: कोइराला) is a surname of Khas people of South Asia, primarily found among Hindu communities such as Hill Brahmin and Hill Chettri of Nepal, and to a lesser extent in Myanmar (Burmese Gurkhas) and other South Asian countries such as India (Indian Gorkhas) and Bhutan (Lhotshampa people). The Koirala surname belongs to the Maudgalya clan.

== Etymology ==
The Koirala is an toponymic surname derived from Koirali village, located in the Sinja Valley of Jumla District in Karnali Province, Nepal.

== Traditions ==
The Koirala people traditionally worship Masto as their family deity (Kuldevata). The form of worship consist of animal sacrifices, such as goats or sheep.

== Notable people ==
- Anuradha Koirala, Nepalese social activist and founder of Maiti Nepal
- Bhagawan Koirala, Nepalese cardiac surgeon and former Executive Director
- Bishweshwar Prasad Koirala, Nepalese politician and the first demotrically elected Prime Minister of Nepal
- Bharat Koirala, Nepalese journalist and winner of the 2002 Ramon Magsaysay Award for Journalism
- Girija Prasad Koirala, Nepalese politician and five-time Prime Minister of Nepal and the Head of State (2007 to 2008)
- Krishna Prasad Koirala, Nepalese politician and the founder of the Koirala family
- Manisha Koirala, Nepalese film actress
- Matrika Prasad Koirala, Nepalese politician and the first Prime Minister of Nepal after the Rana regime from (1951–1952; 1953–1955)
- Mohan Koirala, Nepalese poet and winner of the Madan Puraskar and the Sajha Puraskar (2x)
- Prakash Koirala, Nepalese politician
- Raj Ballav Koirala, Nepalese film actor
- Shashanka Koirala, Nepalese politician
- Shekhar Koirala, Nepalese politician
- Siddharth Koirala, Nepalese film actor
- Sujata Koirala, Nepalese politician and former Deputy Prime Minister of Nepal
- Sujata Koirala, Nepalese film actress
- Sushil Koirala, Nepalese politician and former Prime Minister of Nepal
- Sushila Koirala, Former first lady of Nepal
- Tarini Prasad Koirala, Nepalese politician, journalist and writer

== See also ==
- Koirala family – a Nepalese political dynasty
