= Shailaja Acharya =

Nepali politician

- शैलजा आचार्य

Prime Minister of Nepal (acting)
- In office September 1998 – December 1998

Deputy Prime Minister of Nepal
- In office 1995–2000
- Constituency: Morang-5

President of Nepali Congress Party
- In office 1994–1999
- Constituency: Morang

Minister of Agriculture and forests
- In office 1991–1993
- Monarch: Birendra
- Prime Minister: Girija Prasad Koirala

Minister of Water Resources
- In office 1997–1998
- Monarch: Birendra

Member of Parliament, Pratinidhi Sabha
- In office 15 April 1998 – 1998
- Monarch: Birendra
- Prime Minister: Girija Prasad Koirala

Nepal's Ambassador to India
- In office 2007–TBD
- Preceded by: Karna Dhoj Adhikari

Personal details
- Born: 1944
- Died: 12 June 2009 (aged 64–65) T.U.Teaching Hospital, Kathmandu
- Party: Nepali Congress
- Relatives: Matrika Prasad Koirala (uncle); BP Koirala, (uncle); Girija Prasad Koirala (uncle); Tarini Prasad Koirala (uncle); Manisha Koirala (niece); Sujata Koirala (cousin); Shashanka Koirala (cousin); Shekhar Koirala (cousin); Prakash Koirala (cousin); Siddharth Koirala (nephew)
- Occupation: activist, politician, diplomat
- Awards: Maha Ujjwal Rashtradip

Shailaja Acharya (Nepali: शैलजा आचार्य) (1944 – 12 June 2009) was a Nepali revolutionary, politician and diplomat. She served as the Prime Minister of Nepal for three months in 1998. She also was the first Nepali woman to be elected as the Deputy Prime Minister of Nepal

A member of the influential Koirala family, Acharya entered active politics as a student, and was held political prisoner for three years as a teenager, after she showed a black flag to King Mahendra in protest of coup d'état by the monarchy against the democratically elected government in 1961. Upon release, she went into self-exile in India where she fostered a close friendship with Indian leaders, notably Chandra Sekhar, while she continued to advance the democratic struggle against the Panchayat System. She played an instrumental role in organising the youth movement, collecting and smuggling arms and ammunition for a possible armed conflict and publishing a paper to raise political awareness. She accompanied BP Koirala when the latter returned to Nepal and was immediately arrested upon arrival. She spent a total of five years in jail during the Panchayat regime.

After the reinstitution of democracy, Acharya was elected twice to parliament, in 1991 and 1994. Between 1991 and 1993, she was the Minister for Agriculture, a post she resigned in protest of corruption in the government. In 1997, she became the first woman Minister for Water Resources, and in 1998, she became the first woman deputy prime minister. After King Gyanendra suspended democracy in another coup, she continued to support constitutional monarchy publicly, in defiance of her party's position. She was appointed ambassador to India in 2007.

Acharya was diagnosed with Alzheimer's disease in 2007. She died of pneumonia in Kathmandu on 12 June 2009. She is remembered for her principled positions, her defiance of tyranny at a young age, her role in the fight for democracy, and her philanthropic activities. She was awarded the honour of Maha Ujjwal Rashtradip by the government of Nepal in 2014.

== Personal life ==
Acharya was born in 1944 Her mother, Indira Koirala Acharya, had participated in the democratic revolution of 1950, and was one of the first four Nepali women to be arrested by the Rana regime. Acharya had a sister, Madhu Bastola and a brother, Pradeep Acharya.

Acharya is the niece of former Nepal prime ministers Matrika Prasad Koirala, BP Koirala and Girija Prasad Koirala. Bollywood actress Manisha Koirala is her niece. She was close friends with former Indian Prime Minister Chandra Sekhar. She had an Intermediate of Science (I.Sc.) degree. She did not marry.

== Career ==
She was a senior leader in Nepali Congress, rising to the post of party vice-chair. Among the second generation of Nepali Congress leaders, she was considered one of the few ideological pathfinders. She was deeply involved with her constituency in Morang.

=== Panchayat regime ===
On 18 February 1961, she showed a black flag to King Mahendra in protest of the latter suspending democracy in Nepal and imprisoning the democratically elected prime minister BP Koirala who was also her uncle. She was jailed for three years for the offence. She spent a total of five years in prison during her struggle against the Panchayat system.

She spent nine years in self-imposed exile to India. During her stay there, she was one of the most prominent leaders in organising and mobilising the democratic resistance from India. She, along with Bhim Bahadur Tamang and Chakra Prasad Bastola, was instrumental in re-organising Tarun Dal, the youth wing of the party, in 1973-74. The three oversaw the logistics of the Tarun Dal meeting at a school in Baburi village of Varanasi. She was also the Chief Editor of Tarun, which was published from Varanasi during the same period. She was instrumental in collecting arms and ammunition — along with Nona Koirala, and Chakra Prasad Bastola, another veteran Nepali Congress leader who was also her brother-in-law — in an effort to smuggle arms into Nepal to conduct an armed revolution. Some of the arms were later used in the 1973 Nepal plane hijacking. After the party abandoned the ides of armed struggle, the arms and ammunition were donated to the Bengali people who were fighting against the government of East Pakistan.

She returned to Nepal in 1976 along with BP Koirala, but she and everyone else were immediately arrested upon landing at Tribhuvan International Airport, and taken directly to Sundarijal jail.

=== 1990s ===
After the reinstatement of democracy in Nepal in 1990, she won two terms to parliament from her home district of Morang. She won her first term in May 1991, from Morang-5 constituency. In the Nepali Congress government formed by Girija Prasad Koirala in 1991, she was given an opportunity to choose her own ministerial portfolio. She chose the ministry of agriculture and forests which she led until 1993. In 1993, she resigned from the cabinet charging the government with nepotism and rampant "commission culture". Incidentally, as Girija Prasad Koirala's niece, she too was a beneficiary of Koirala's alleged nepotism.

She won her second term in parliament in the 1994 election, again from Morang. In 1997, she became the minister of Water Resources, and for a brief period in 1998, she became the first Nepali woman Deputy Prime minister. She was also the first woman to become Minister of Water Resources. Since then, she was slowly sidelined in the party.

=== 2000s ===
Acharya drew widespread criticism for her opposition to the seven-party alliance against the direct rule by the king. Her support for constitutional monarchy and opposition to the 2006 revolution effectively ended her prospects in active politics.

In 2007, she was appointed Nepal's ambassador to India, succeeding Karna Dhoj Adhikari. She faced opposition from other parties in the coalition government due to her controversial stance against the revolution of 2006, but was eventually cleared for appointment by the parliamentary committee overseeing the ambassadorial appointments.

== Philanthropy ==
Acharya was involved with several NGOs and other charity work, mainly in the field of women empowerment and welfare. She established the Krishna Prasad Koirala guthi in memory of her maternal grandfather, and donated financial and other support to the establishment of Shailaja Acharya Polytechnic Institute in a rural village in her constituency in Morang, which was named after her in recognition of her contributions to its founding. She had donated 1.5 bigha of land for the construction site of the institute, and later negotiated a partnership with CTEVT to provide accessible skills training to poor women and girls in the community.

== Illness and death ==
In her final years, she was in poor health having been diagnosed with Alzheimer's disease and dropped out almost completely from public life. After a long battle with Alzheimer's disease and pneumonia, she died around 4:25 am on 12 June 2009, at the age of 65. She had previously sought treatment in Bangkok for nine months as well as in New Delhi, and two days before her death, had been admitted to TU Teaching Hospital in Kathmandu, where she was on ventilator support in the ICU.

Her body was kept for public viewing at Nepali Congress Party Headquarters in Sanepa, where Girija Prasad Koirala draped her body with the party's flag. She was also given a gun-salute by an army-contingent. She was cremated at the Pashupati Aryaghat, later that same day. The parliament passed a resolution of condolences over her demise.

== Honours ==
Acharya was awarded the Maha Ujjwal Rashtradip (lit. 'Super-luminescent Light of the Nation') by a cabinet decision on 28 May 2014, for her contributions.

== Legacy ==
Acharya has been remembered as an inspiring figure and "a rebellious personality" by senior Nepali Congress leader Ram Chandra Paudel. Former minister Mohan Bahadur Basnet has characterised her as a lifelong devotee to democracy with a "clean image". The then prime minister Madhav Kumar Nepal, speaking at her funeral, called her an icon of democratic values and principles, further stating that her determined fight against "corruption, irregularities and wrongful attitudes even when she was in power" was exemplary.

She was the first, and at the time of her death, only Nepali woman to become deputy prime minister. Her cousin, Sujata Koirala, became the second to woman deputy prime minister in October 2009. Her showing the black flag to King Mahendra in 1961 for which she spent three years in jail, is considered a landmark event in the history of Nepalese struggle for freedom and democracy.

Despite her success, she is considered to have underachieved. Even labelled the "most famous nobody of Nepal", attempted explanations for her underachievement in Nepali politics have centred around her conservative stances, specially her support for constitutional monarchy at a time when the whole country was moving towards republicanism, and overshadowing by keen uncle Girija Prasad Koirala who did not relinquish his position in the party or the national politics to make way for the second generation of leaders among whom Acharya was in the top-tier for most of her political career. However, Acharya herself attributed it to sexism, claiming that she was not taken seriously because of her gender, and her contributions and sacrifices were undervalued or ignored.

Nepal Press Union, Morang awards Shailaja Acharya Memorial Journalism Award in her honour. Shailaja Acharya Adarsha Samaj promotes Acharya's ideals. In her home constituency in Morang, Shailaja Acharya Memorial Scholarship Fund grants free scholarships to deserving school students.
