= Sujata Koirala =

Nepali politician

- सुजाता कोइराला
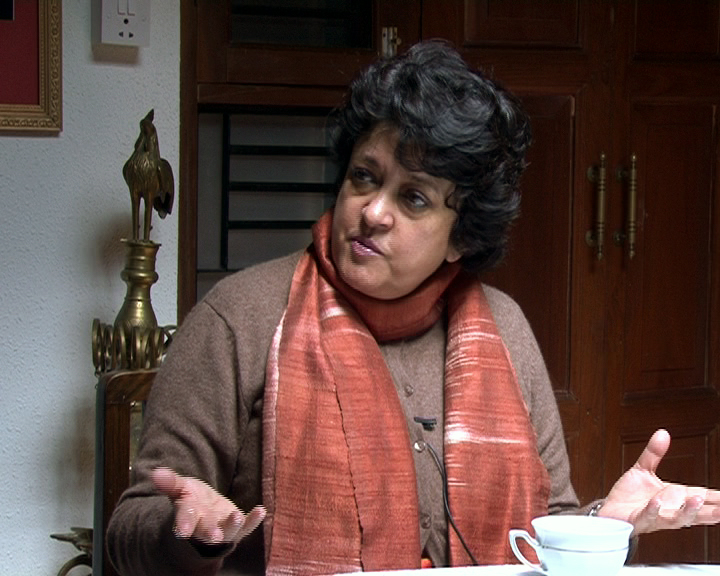

Deputy Prime Minister of Nepal
- In office 12 October 2009 – 6 February 2011 Serving with Bijay Kumar Gachhadar
- President: Ram Baran Yadav
- Prime Minister: Madhav Kumar Nepal
- Preceded by: Bam Dev Gautam
- Succeeded by: Bharat Mohan Adhikari; Narayan Kaji Shrestha; Krishna Bahadur Mahara; Upendra Yadav

Minister of Foreign Affairs of Nepal
- In office 4 June 2009 – 6 February 2011
- President: Ram Baran Yadav
- Prime Minister: Madhav Kumar Nepal
- Preceded by: Upendra Yadav
- Succeeded by: Narayan Kaji Shrestha

Member of the House of Representatives
- In office 4 March 2018 – 18 September 2022
- PR group: Khas Arya (Women)
- Constituency: Nepali Congress PR list

Member of the Legislature Parliament
- In office 21 January 2014 – 14 October 2017
- PR group: Khas Arya (Women)
- Constituency: Nepali Congress PR list

Personal details
- Born: 9 February 1954 (age 72) Biratnagar, Kingdom of Nepal
- Party: Nepali Congress
- Spouse: Norbert Jost
- Children: 2
- Parent: Girija Prasad Koirala (father)
- Relatives: BP Koirala, (uncle); Matrika Prasad Koirala (uncle); Tarini Prasad Koirala (uncle); Manisha Koirala (niece); Shailaja Acharya (cousin); Shashanka Koirala (cousin); Shekhar Koirala (cousin); Prakash Koirala (cousin); Siddharth Koirala (nephew); See Koirala family

Sujata Koirala (Nepali: सुजाता कोइराला; born 9 February 1954) is a Nepalese politician and the only daughter of former Prime Minister Girija Prasad Koirala. She was made Foreign Minister under Prime Minister Madhav Kumar Nepal. Sujata was promoted to Deputy Prime Minister on 12 October 2009. She has a daughter named Melanie Koirala Jost.

== Career ==
Koirala is the Immediate Chief of the International Relations Department of Nepali Congress and a member of the party's Central Working Committee. She is a former Deputy Prime Minister and Minister for Foreign Affairs of Nepal. She is the second woman to become deputy prime minister in Nepal. The first, Shailaja Acharya, was Koirala's cousin.

=== International affiliations ===
Koirala is an active member of several international committees including the following:

- Head of International Relations Department, Nepali Congress Party
- Central Committee Member, Nepali Congress Party
- Member, Parliamentary Board, Nepali Congress Party
- Standing Committee Member, ICAPP (International Conference of Asian Political Parties)
- Member, Governing Council, CAPDI (Centrist Asia Pacific Democratic International)
- Vice-Chairperson, ICAPP Women's Wing
- Chairperson, the Global Parties Climate and Ecological Alliance (GPCEA) Women's Wing
- Member, International Advisory Board, China Center for Overseas Investment, Beijing, China
- Member, International Advisory Council, Economic Club of China, Beijing, China
- Honorary Chairperson, Institute of Himalayan Studies, Chongqing, China
