= Second Girija Prasad Koirala cabinet =

Government of Nepal in 1998

- Cabinet of Nepal
- April 1998–December 1998
- Date formed: 15 April 1998
- Date dissolved: 23 December 1998

People and organisations
- Monarch: King Birendra
- Prime Minister: Girija Prasad Koirala
- Deputy Prime Minister: Shailaja Acharya
- Total no. of members: 43 appointments
- Member parties: Nepali Congress CPN (Marxist–Leninist)
- Status in legislature: Majority (coalition)
- Opposition party: CPN (UML)
- Opposition leaders: Man Mohan Adhikari

History
- Election: 1994
- Legislature terms: 1994–1999
- Predecessor: Fourth Thapa cabinet
- Successor: Third Koirala cabinet

The second Girija Prasad Koirala cabinet was formed on 15 April 1998 after the appointment of Nepali Congress leader Girija Prasad Koirala as prime minister by King Birendra. Girja was supported by CPN (Marxist–Leninist). The cabinet was expanded on 21 April 1998. On 26 August 1998, the cabinet was reshuffled and ministers from CPN (Marxist–Leninist) where included. After CPN (Marxist–Leninist) withdrew their support for the government on 11 December 1998, Girija resigned as prime minister ten days later.

== Cabinet ==
=== April–August 1998 ===
Portfolio	Minister	Party	Took office	Left office
Prime Minister of Nepal; Minister for Palace Affairs; Minister for Defence; Minister for Foreign Affairs	Girija Prasad Koirala	Nepali Congress	15 April 1998	23 December 1998
Deputy Prime Minister Minister for Water Supply	Shailaja Acharya	Nepali Congress	15 April 1998	23 December 1998
Minister for Industry Minister for Labour	Dhundi Raj Shastri	Nepali Congress	21 April 1998	26 August 1998
Minister for Land Reform and Management	Chiranjibi Wagle	Nepali Congress	21 April 1998	23 December 1998
Minister for Commerce	Chiranjibi Wagle	Nepali Congress	21 April 1998	26 August 1998
Minister for Forests and Soil Conservation Minister for Supplies	Khum Bahadur Khadka	Nepali Congress	21 April1998	24 April 1998
Minister for Home Affairs	Govinda Raj Joshi	Nepali Congress	21 April 1998	23 December 1998
Minister for Agriculture	Chakra Prasad Bastola	Nepali Congress	21 April 1998	26 August 1998
Minister for Finance	Ram Sharan Mahat	Nepali Congress	15 April 1998	23 December 1998
Minister for Construction and Transportation	Bijay Kumar Gachhadar	Nepali Congress	21 April 1998	23 December 1998
Minister for Education	Arjun Narasingha K.C.	Nepali Congress	21 April 1998	23 December 1998
Minister for Housing and Physical Planning	Arjun Narasingha K.C.	Nepali Congress	21 April 1998	26 August 1998
Minister for General Administration	Bimalendra Nidhi	Nepali Congress	21 April 1998	23 December 1998
Minister for Local Development	Prakash Man Singh	Nepali Congress	21 April 1998	26 August 1998
Minister for Information and Communications	Mahantha Thakur	Nepali Congress	21 April 1998	26 August 1998
Minister for Law and Justice	Siddha Raj Ojha	Nepali Congress	21 April 1998	26 August 1998
Minister for Forests and Soil Conservation	Siddha Raj Ojha	Nepali Congress	5 May 1998	26 August 1998
Minister for Health	Kul Bahadur Gurung	Nepali Congress	21 April 1998	23 December 1998
Minister for Parliamentary Affairs	Omkar Shrestha	Nepali Congress	21 April 1998	23 December 1998
Minister for Science and Technology	Omkar Shrestha	Nepali Congress	21 April 1998	26 August 1998
Minister for Tourism and Civil Aviation	Ananda Prasad Dhungana	Nepali Congress	21 April 1998	26 August 1998
Minister for Supplies	Ananda Prasad Dhungana	Nepali Congress	5 May 1998	26 August 1998
Minister for Youth, Sports and Culture	Purna Bahadur Khadka	Nepali Congress	21 April 1998	23 December 1998
Minister for Population and Environment	Purna Bahadur Khadka	Nepali Congress	21 April 1998	26 August 1998
Ministers of State
Minister of State for Women and Social Welfare	Mina Pandey	Nepali Congress	21 April 1998	23 December 1998
Minister of State for Forests and Soil Conservation	Bhakta Bahadur Rokaya	Nepali Congress	21 April 1998	26 August 1998
Minister of State for Supplies	Ram Bahadur Gurung	Nepali Congress	21 April 1998	26 August 1998
Minister of State for Finance	Dip Kumar Upadhaya	Nepali Congress	21 April 1998	26 August 1998
Minister of State for Home Affairs	Devendra Kandel	Nepali Congress	21 April 1998	26 August 1998
Minister of State for Local Development	Rajdev Goit	Nepali Congress	21 April 1998	26 August 1998
Minister of State for Health	Bhakta Bahadur Balayar	Nepali Congress	21 April 1998	26 August 1998
Minister of State for Industry Minister of State for Labour	Amar Raj Kaini	Nepali Congress	21 April 1998	26 August 1998
Assistant Ministers
Assistant Minister for Women and Social Welfare	Kamala Panta	Nepali Congress	21 April 1998	26 August 1998

=== August–December 1998 ===
Portfolio	Minister	Party	Took office	Left office
Prime Minister of Nepal; Minister for Palace Affairs; Minister for Defence; Minister for Foreign Affairs	Girija Prasad Koirala	Nepali Congress	15 April 1998	23 December 1998
Deputy Prime Minister Minister for Water Supply	Shailaja Acharya	Nepali Congress	15 April 1998	23 December 1998
Minister for Information and Communications	Radha Krishna Mainali	CPN (Marxist–Leninist)	26 August 1998	11 December 1998
Minister for Land Reform and Management	Chiranjibi Wagle	Nepali Congress	21 April 1998	23 December 1998
Minister for Supplies	Khum Bahadur Khadka	Nepali Congress	26 August 1998	23 December 1998
Minister for Home Affairs	Govinda Raj Joshi	Nepali Congress	21 April 1998	23 December 1998
Minister for Finance	Ram Sharan Mahat	Nepali Congress	15 April 1998	23 December 1998
Minister for Construction and Transportation	Bijay Kumar Gachhadar	Nepali Congress	21 April 1998	23 December 1998
Minister for Education	Arjun Narasingha K.C.	Nepali Congress	21 April 1998	23 December 1998
Minister for Law and Justice	Sita Nandan Raya	CPN (Marxist–Leninist)	26 August 1998	11 December 1998
Minister for General Administration	Bimalendra Nidhi	Nepali Congress	21 April 1998	23 December 1998
Minister for Health	Kul Bahadur Gurung	Nepali Congress	21 April 1998	23 December 1998
Minister for Agriculture	Trilochan Dhakal	CPN (Marxist–Leninist)	26 August 1998	11 December 1998
Minister for Local Development	Keshav Lal Shrestha	CPN (Marxist–Leninist)	26 August 1998	11 December 1998
Minister for Parliamentary Affairs	Omkar Shrestha	Nepali Congress	21 April 1998	23 December 1998
Minister for Forests and Soil Conservation	Ananda Prasad Dhungana	Nepali Congress	26 August 1998	23 December 1998
Minister for Housing and Physical Planning	Rajendra Prasad Shrestha	CPN (Marxist–Leninist)	26 August 1998	11 December 1998
Minister for Youth, Sports and Culture	Purna Bahadur Khadka	Nepali Congress	21 April 1998	23 December 1998
Minister for Tourism and Civil Aviation	Yam Lal Kandel	CPN (Marxist–Leninist)	26 August 1998	11 December 1998
Minister for Industry	Hemraj Rai	CPN (Marxist–Leninist)	26 August 1998	11 December 1998
Minister for Population and Environment	Ambika Sawa	CPN (Marxist–Leninist)	26 August 1998	11 December 1998
Ministers of State
Minister of State for Women and Social Welfare	Mina Pandey	Nepali Congress	21 April 1998	
Minister of State for Labour	Govinda Nath Upreti	CPN (Marxist–Leninist)	26 August 1998	11 December 1998
Minister of State for Science and Technology	Rajdev Goit	Nepali Congress	26 August 1998	23 December 1998
Minister of State for Commerce	Jagat Bahadur Bogati	CPN (Marxist–Leninist)	26 August 1998	11 December 1998
Assistant Ministers
Assistant Minister for Health	Ram Chandra Adhikari	Nepali Congress	26 August 1998	8 December 1998
Assistant Minister for Education	Ram Janam Chaudhary	Nepali Congress	26 August 1998	23 December 1998
Assistant Minister for Forests and Soil Conservation	Mohammad Aftab Alam	Nepali Congress	26 August 1998	23 December 1998
Assistant Minister for Local Development	Dev Bahadur Poudel	CPN (Marxist–Leninist)	26 August 1998	11 December 1998
Assistant Minister for Information and Communications	Yagyaraj Neupane	CPN (Marxist–Leninist)	26 August 1998	11 December 1998
Assistant Minister for Land Reform and Management	Jhalak Nath Wagle	Nepali Congress	26 August 1998	23 December 1998
Assistant Minister for Industry	Laxmi Narayan Chaudhary	CPN (Marxist–Leninist)	26 August 1998	11 December 1998
