= Chakra Prasad Bastola =

Nepalese politician (1944–2018)

Chakra Prasad Bastola Former Minister of Nepal
- Born: November 20, 1944; Jhapa, Nepal
- Died: October 13, 2018 (aged 73); Lalitpur, Nepal
- Education: University of Oxford, Banaras Hindu University, Eton College
- Occupation: Foreign Minister of Nepal
- Term: July 11, 2003 – October 11, 2003
- Political party: Nepali Congress
- Spouse(s): Madhu Acharya; Kusum Bastola
- Children: 2

Chakra Prasad Bastola was a Nepalese politician who served as the Minister of Foreign Affairs of Nepal from 10 April 2000 to 26 July 2002, as well as Minister of Home Affairs from 2004 to 2006 and the Nepalese ambassador to India from 1990 to 1999. He was one of the key members of the hijacking of Royal Nepal Airlines Flight 34 in 1973 that was carrying funds that the Nepali Congress needed to overthrow the Monarchy for which he was sentenced to jail for 18 months in Bihar, India.

== Education ==
Bastola was a Rhodes Scholar. After his time in prison he went to the University of Oxford, United Kingdom, to study for a Master's degree in political science. He then studied for a PHD at Banaras Hindu University in India.

== Political Life ==
Bastola was responsible for providing weapons for the Royal Nepal Airlines hijacking. After the failure of the hijacking Bastola was imprisoned in Nakhu, Kathmandu and later in Patna Bihar.

After Bastola's study in India, on returning to Nepal in 1990 he ran for the legislative assembly from his home district of Jhapa. In 1994 Bastola was sent to New Delhi as Nepal's ambassador. He resigned the ambassadorship in 2001 and returned to Nepal.

Bastola went on four foreign trips to India, China, Russia and the United States.

== Personal life ==
Bastola was born in 1944 in Jhapa District and died on 13 October 2018 in Khumaltar, Lalitpur. Bastola was married twice. His first wife was Madhu Acharya, the sister of former Prime Minister Shailaja Acharya. His wife was also a niece of BP Koirala, Matrika Prasad Koirala, and Girija Prasad Koirala all Former Prime Ministers. He had two daughters.
