= Third Girija Prasad Koirala cabinet =

Government of Nepal from 1998 to 1999

- Cabinet of Nepal
- December 1998–May 1999
- Date formed: 25 December 1998
- Date dissolved: 31 May 1999

People and organisations
- Monarch: King Birendra
- Prime Minister: Girija Prasad Koirala
- Total no. of members: 11 appointments
- Member parties: Nepali Congress CPN (UML) Nepal Sadbhawana Party
- Status in legislature: Majority (coalition)
- Opposition party: CPN (Marxist–Leninist)
- Opposition leaders: Bam Dev Gautam

History
- Election: 1994
- Legislature terms: 1994–1999
- Predecessor: Second Koirala cabinet
- Successor: K.P. Bhattarai cabinet

The third Girija Prasad Koirala government was formed on 25 December 1998 after Koirala was supported by CPN (UML) and Nepal Sadbhawana Party. The government was formed to hold the 1999 elections, following which Koirala was replaced by Krishna Prasad Bhattarai.

== Cabinet ==
Portfolio	Minister	Party	Took office	Left office
Prime Minister of Nepal; Minister for Palace Affairs	Girija Prasad Koirala	Nepali Congress	25 December 1998	31 May 1999
Minister for Finance; Minister for Law and Justice	Bharat Mohan Adhikari	CPN (UML)	25 December 1998	31 May 1999
Minister for Home Affairs; Minister for General Administration	Govinda Raj Joshi	Nepali Congress	25 December 1998	31 May 1999
Minister for Industry	Gajendra Narayan Singh	Nepal Sadbhawana Party	25 December 1998	31 May 1999
Minister for Education; Minister for Women and Social Welfare	Kul Bahadur Gurung	Nepali Congress	25 December 1998	31 May 1999
Minister for Local Development	Amrit Kumar Bohara	CPN (UML)	25 December 1998	31 May 1999
Minister for Health; Minister for Water Supply	Pradeep Nepal	CPN (UML)	25 December 1998	31 May 1999
Minister for Commerce; Minister for Youth, Sports and Culture	Purna Bahadur Khadka	Nepali Congress	25 December 1998	31 May 1999
Minister for Tourism and Civil Aviation; Minister for Science and Technology	Bhim Bahadur Rawal	CPN (UML)	25 December 1998	31 May 1999
Minister for Information and Communications; Minister for Parliamentary Affairs	Jay Prakash Gupta	Nepali Congress	25 December 1998	31 May 1999
Minister for Population and Environment	Ramesh Nath Pandey	Independent	25 December 1998	31 May 1999
