= Rastra Gaurav Man Padavi =

Second highest civilian award of Nepal

Rastra Gaurav Man Padavi राष्ट्र गौरव मानपदवी
- Type: Order
- Awarded for: service to the country
- Country: Nepal
- Presented by: President of Nepal
- Established: 2010
- First award: 2010
- Final award: 2018

Highlights
- Total recipients: 5

Precedence
- Next (higher): Nepal Ratna Man Padavi
- Next (lower): Maha Ujjwal Rastra Deep (first class)

Rastra Gaurav Man Padavi (Nepali: राष्ट्र गौरव मानपदवी, Order of the National Pride) is the second highest civilian award of Nepal. Instituted in 2010, the award is conferred for contribution to the nation.

== History ==
Order of Tri Shakti Patta was instituted by King Tribhuvan of Nepal in on 27 November 1937. It had 5 classes plus a medal. First Class was Jyotirmaya-Subikhyat-Tri-Shakti-Patta, Second Class was Subikhyat-Tri-Shakti-Patta, Third Class was Bikhyat-Tri-Shakti-Patta, Fourth Class was Prakhyat-Tri-Shakti-Patta, Fifth Class was Tri-Shakti-Patta and there was a medal Tri-Shakti-Patta-Padak.

After the end of monarchy in 2008, the new government introduced a new series of awards. "Nepal Ratna Man Padavi" is the highest class whereas Rastra Gaurav Man Padavi is second highest. The award is conferred by the President of Nepal on the Republic Day, 29 May.

== Recipients ==
Key
Posthumous recipient

Year	Laureates	Notes
2010	Girija Prasad Koirala	Prime Minister of Nepal from 1991 to 1994, 1998–1999, 2000–2001 and 2006–2008. Acting Head of State from 2007 to 2008. Pro-democracy activist and former leader of the Nepali Congress.
2010	Man Mohan Adhikari	Prime Minister of Nepal from 1995 to 1996. Pro-democracy activist, founder of the Communist Party of Nepal and leader of the Communist Party of Nepal (Unified Marxist–Leninist).
2016	Sushil Koirala	Prime Minister of Nepal from 2014 to 2015. Pro-democracy activist, leader of Nepali Congress.
2016	Subas Chandra Nemwang	Chairman of the 1st Nepalese Constituent Assembly. Parliamentarian since 1991.
2018	Mahendra Narayan Nidhi	Deputy speaker of First House of Representatives of Nepal, founding general secretary of Nepali Congress. A well known veteran politician of Nepal and a democracy fighter and Gandhian leader of Nepal.
