= Sushila Koirala =

Former First Lady of Nepal

- सुशीला कोइराला
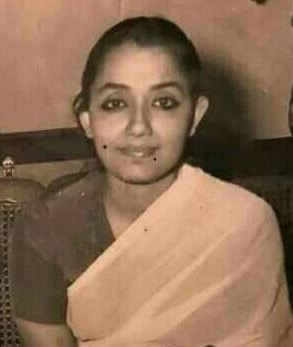
- Born: Sushila Dahal; 1923; Kapilvastu Municipality, Lumbini Province, Kingdom of Nepal
- Died: 13 July 2007 (aged 83–84); Kathmandu, Nepal
- Education: Banaras Hindu University
- Political party: Nepali Congress
- Spouse: B. P. Koirala (m. 1936; died 1982)
- Children: 4, including Prakash Koirala and Shashanka Koirala
- Relatives: Koirala family

Sushila Koirala (Nepali: सुशीला कोइराला; 1923 – 13 July 2007) was a Nepalese classical dancer and theater director. She was the spouse of B. P. Koirala, the first democratically elected prime minister of Nepal. She was known for her contribution towards Nepali art, theatre, and girls’ empowerment; and for backstopping in democratic activities during the critical and raw era of social change and politics in Nepal.

== Personal life ==
Sushila Koirala was born in 1923 in Kapilvastu in Lumbini, Nepal. She married B. P. Koirala in 1936 and went to Biratnagar. She attended and completed school level education there in Biratngar. Later she studied at Banaras Hindu University in Banaras in India. She also studied Bharatnatyam and Kathak, two major forms of Indian classical dance in India. Sushila Koirala was also trained in Manipuri dance. Her husband B. P. Koirala has described her as "young and slim" in his autobiography entitled Atmabrittanta, and has added that she survived kala-azar.

Sushila Koirala died on 13 July 2007 in Kathmandu, Nepal.

== Career ==
Sushila Koirala always believed art, dance and music to be universal languages that unite everything and everyone around. In 1959, her husband had become the Prime Minister but she was never comfortable with the trappings of power around her. Rather, she decided to open a dance institute in Biratnagar and established a dance centre at her home there, which was possibly the first classical dance centre in Nepal. She would visit her husband in Kathmandu casually only during the necessity of her presence as the first lady of the country. It is said that once the then royal couple of Nepal asked her why she was not in Kathmandu acting as the hostess to her Prime Minister husband, and she responded that she had to give time to her dance center in Biratnagar.

When Sushila Koirala was in Patna in India during the 1950s, she actively worked to establish a performing art institution there too. She and her friends like Hari Uppal collected donation fund by door to door campaign to establish Bhartiya Nritya Kala Mandir there in Patna. They laid the foundation stone for the building of the institution in 1950. The institution was later got fully established and opened in 1963 when Koirala was facing the consequences of political crisis in Nepal.

Sushila Koirala made use of her dancing skills to earn money for the family during difficult times of her husband's imprisonment after 15 December 1960.

== Legacy ==
Sushila Koirala was passionate about dancing and she always wanted to open an art academy in Nepal. Koirala's granddaughter-in-law Yulia, opened Sushila Arts Academy named after her in Kathmandu.

Theatre group Aarohan Gurukul has named one of its theatre halls in Biratnagar as Sushila Koirala Theater on her honour. She was the first ever theatre director from the city. She had directed the play Ma by Balkrishna Sama in the year 1951.

== Honour and accolades ==
In 2007, Sushila Koirala was honoured with the Gangadevi Chaudhari Memorial Honor for "her contribution in women empowerment and awareness".

== See also ==
- B. P. Koirala
- Girija Prasad Koirala
- Manisha Koirala
