= Dekh Bhai Dekh (film) =

2009 film by Rahat Kazmi

- Theatrical poster
- Directed by: Rahat Kazmi
- Written by: Mushahid Husain Pasha; Rahat Kazmi
- Produced by: Vivek Sudarshan; Ashok Chauhan
- Starring: Gracy Singh; Siddharth Koirala; Raghubir Yadav; Vijay Raaz; Asrani
- Cinematography: Akashdeep Pandey
- Edited by: Rajendra Mahapatra
- Music by: Nayab Raja; Abuzar; Prem Ananda
- Release date: 17 July 2009
- Country: India
- Language: Hindi

Dekh Bhai Dekh (Hindi: देख भाई देख; transl. Look, brother, look) is a 2009 Indian Hindi-language comedy film directed by Rahat Kazmi starring Gracy Singh and Siddharth Koirala in the lead roles.

== Cast ==
- Gracy Singh as Babli Lala
- Siddharth Koirala as Shyam
- Raghubir Yadav as Mayalal Yadav
- Vijay Raaz as Charan
- Asrani as Lala Khairatlal
- Arun Bakshi as Police Inspector Chandra Mohan
- Virendra Saxena as Puran
