= Koirala family =

Nepalese political family

- Political family
- Country: Nepal
- Current region: Kathmandu, Nepal
- Origin: Sindhuli, Nepal
- Founded: 19th century
- Titles: The Right Honourable; The Honourable; His Excellency; Jananayak
- Members: Krishna Prasad Koirala; Matrika Prasad Koirala; Kamal Koirala; Bishweshwar Prasad Koirala; Sushila Koirala; Prakash Koirala; Manisha Koirala; Siddharth Koirala; Shashanka Koirala; Keshav Prasad Koirala; Shekhar Koirala; Tarini Prasad Koirala; Girija Prasad Koirala; Sujata Koirala; Nalini Koirala; Indira Koirala; Sauvagya Koirala; Vijaylaxmi Koirala; Sankhar Koirala; Niraj Koirala; Pramila Prasad Koirala; Dadhiram Koirala; Puru Koirala; Atulya Koirala
- Connected members: Sushil Koirala; Amod Upadhyay; Sailaja Acharya; Mahesh Acharya
- Distinctions: Political prominence within the Nepali Congress
- Properties: Koirala Niwas, Biratnagar

The Koirala family (Nepali: कोइराला परिवार) is one of the most prominent political families of Nepal and is closely associated with the Nepali Congress. The family originally hails from Dumja village in Sindhuli District, Nepal. Several members of the Koirala family have served as Prime Minister of Nepal, while others have held key positions as ministers and members of parliament. They were also among the main figures in establishing democracy in Nepal and played a significant role in the country’s political movements.

Krishna Prasad Koirala, is regarded as the patriarch and founding figure of the Koirala political dynasty, he was a socio-political activist during the Rana dynasty and was exiled to India by then Prime Minister Chandra Sumsher J.B. Rana. Four members of the family, Matrika Prasad Koirala, Bishweshwar Prasad Koirala, Girija Prasad Koirala, and their cousin Sushil Koirala, have served as Prime Ministers of Nepal.

== Family members ==
Father: Krishna Prasad Koirala

Sons:

1. Matrika Prasad Koirala (1912–1997) – Former two-time Prime Minister of Nepal
2. Bishweshwar Prasad Koirala (1914–1982) – Former Prime Minister of Nepal
3. Keshav Prasad Koirala (1922–1974)
4. Tarini Prasad Koirala (1923–1974) – Former politician, writer, and journalist
5. Girija Prasad Koirala (1925–2010) – Former four-time Prime Minister of Nepal

Daughters:

1. Nalini Koirala (Upadhyay)
2. Indira Koirala (Acharya)
3. Sauvagya Kumari Koirala (Arjel)
4. Vijaya Laxmi Koirala (Zaki)

== Gallery ==
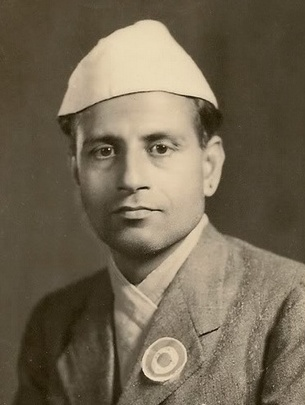
Matrika Prasad Koirala

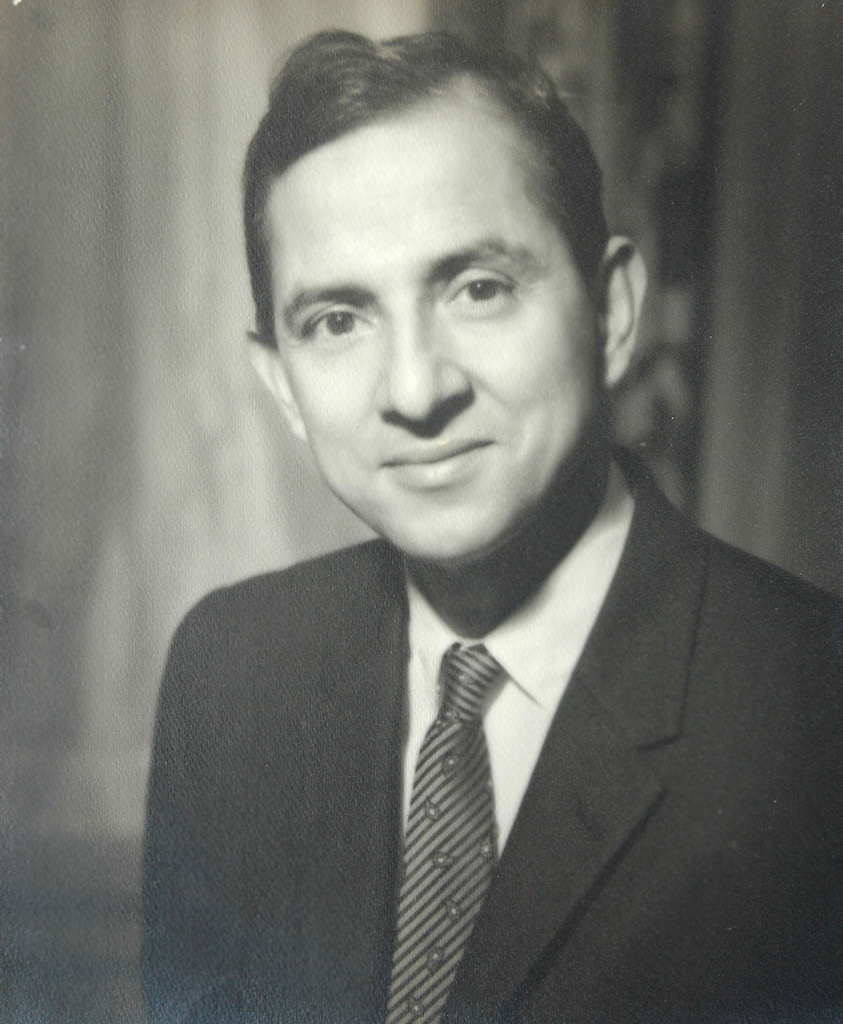
Bishweshwar Prasad Koirala

Tarini Prasad Koirala

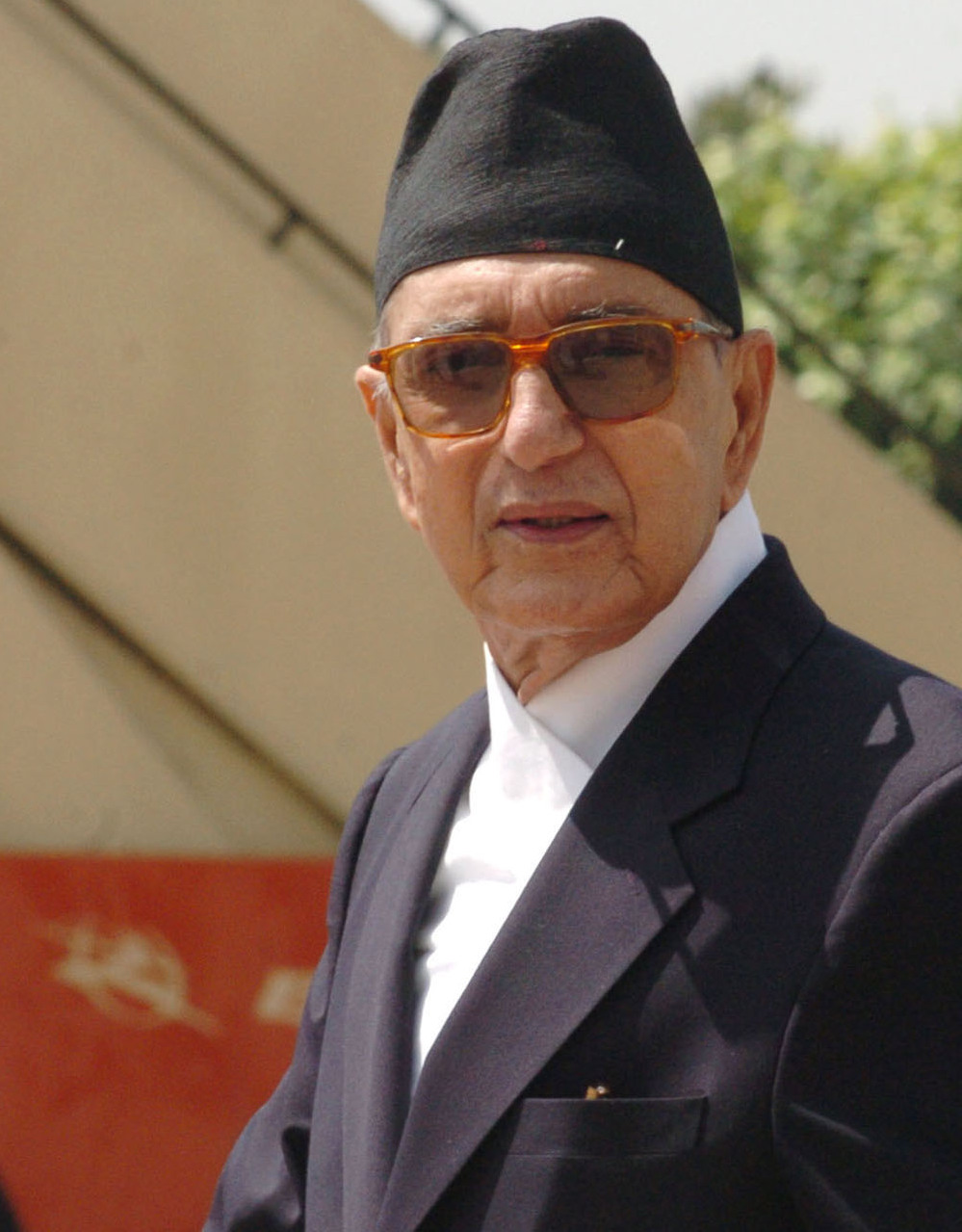
Girija Prasad Koirala

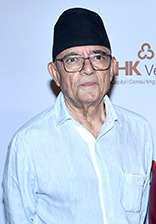
Prakash Koirala

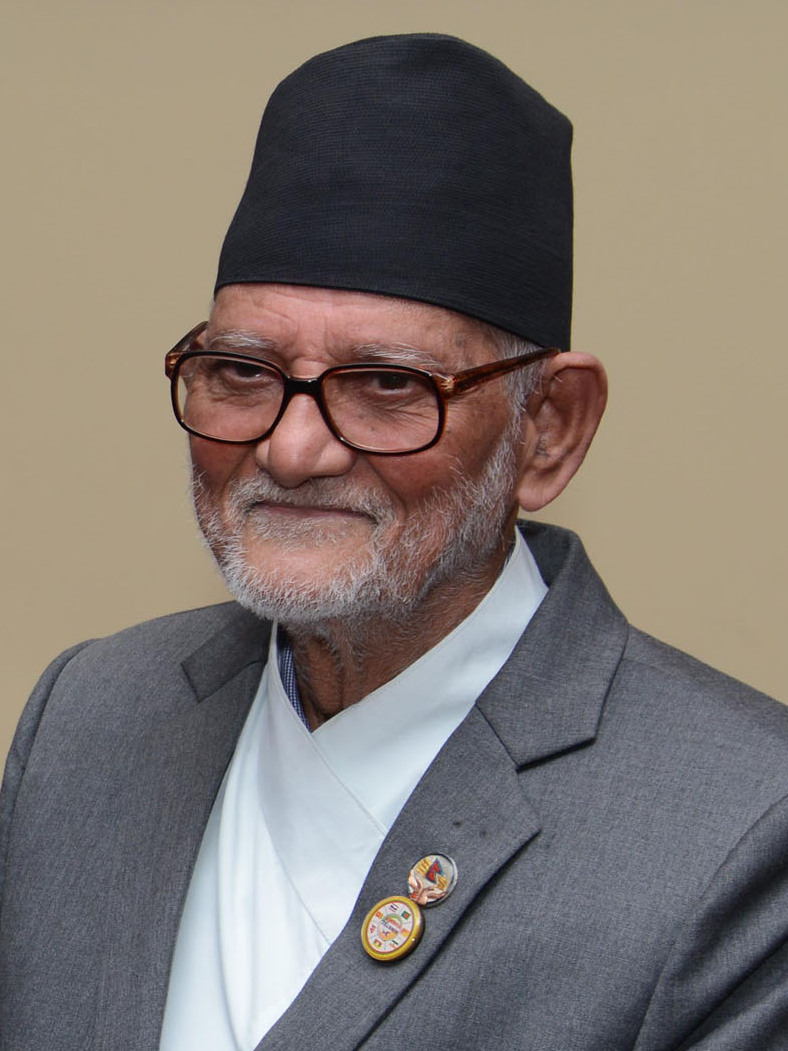
Sushil Koirala

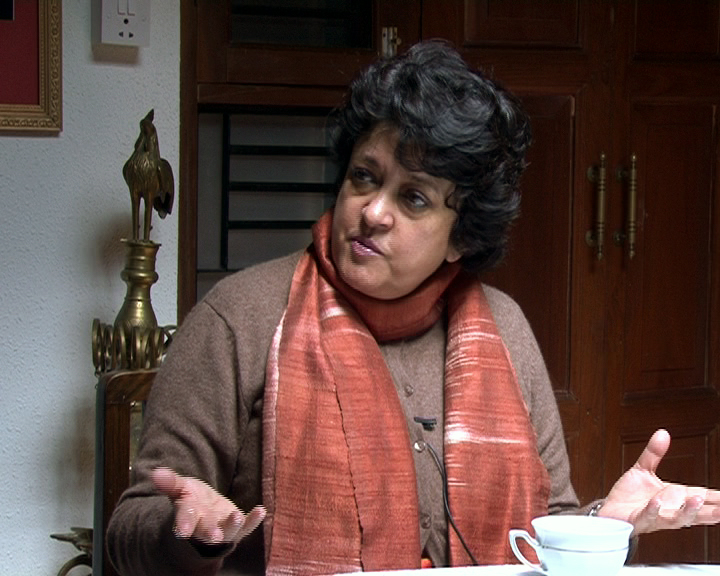
Sujata Koirala

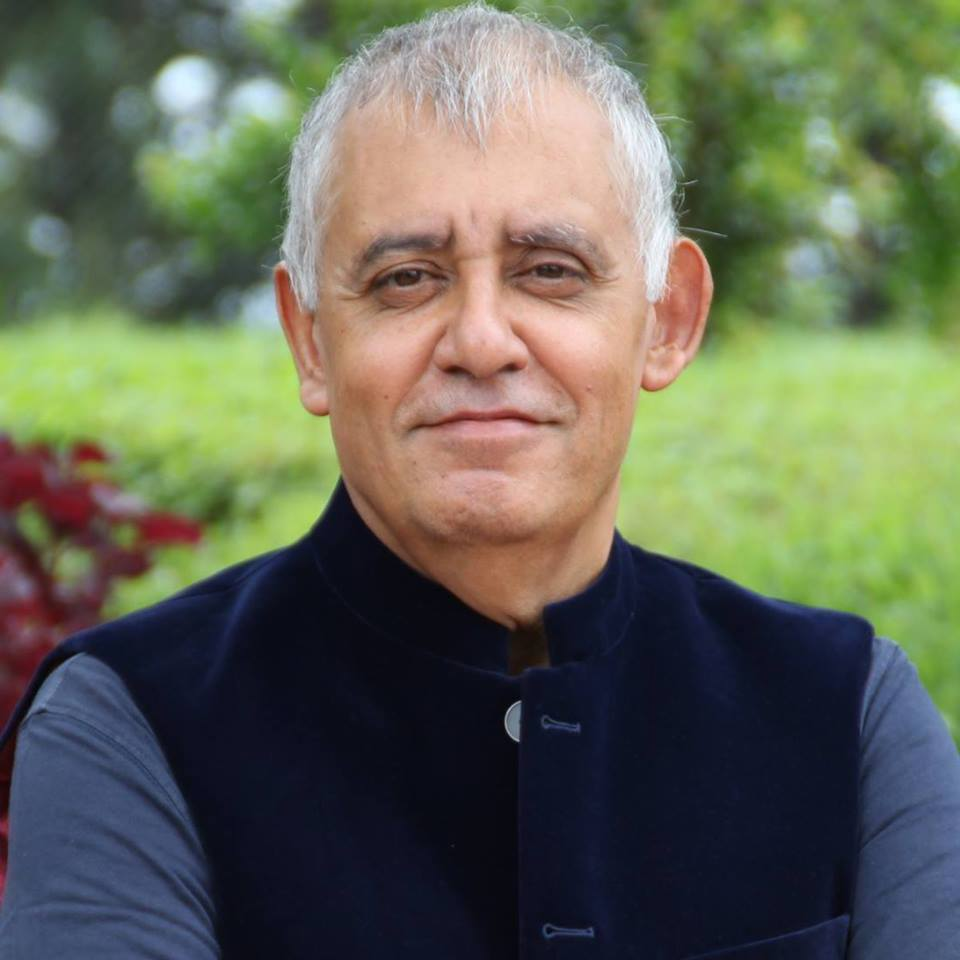
Shashanka Koirala

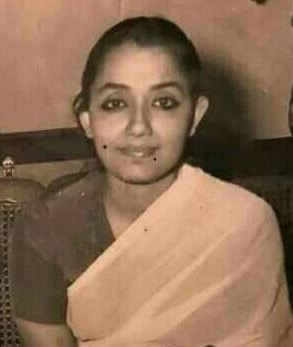
Sushila Koirala

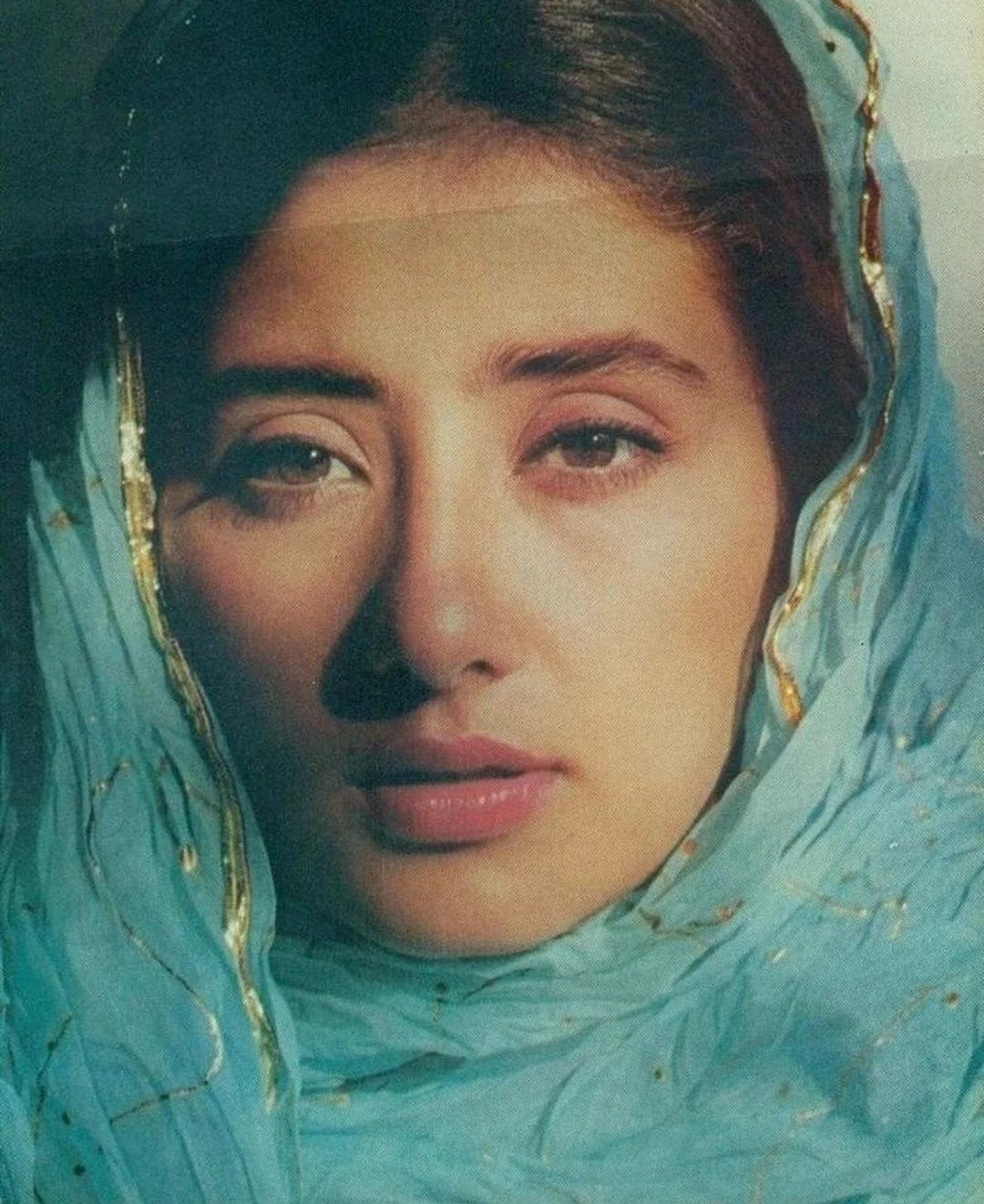
Manisha Koirala

== Honors ==
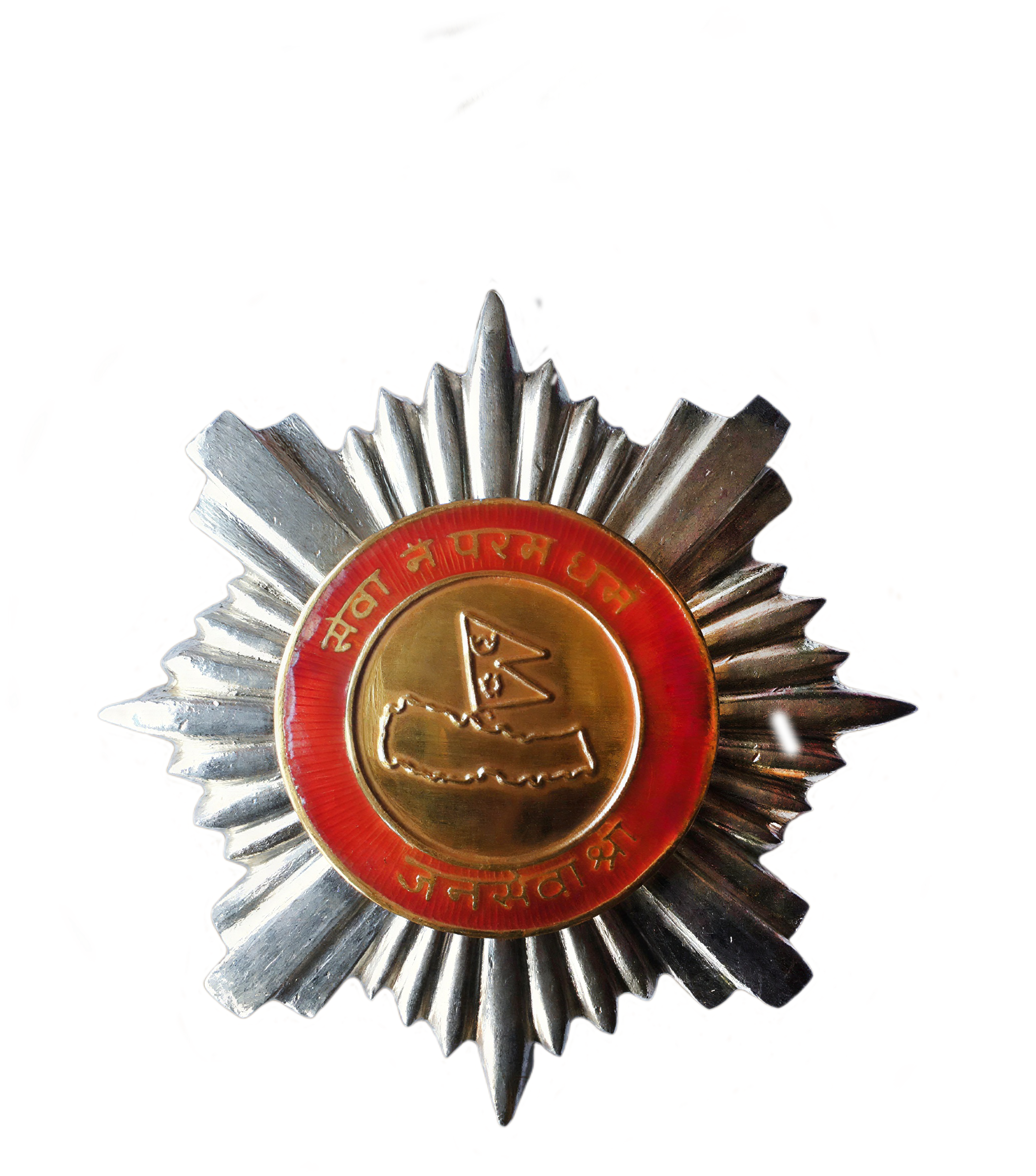
- Nepal Ratna Man Padavi (2015) – Posthumously awarded to Girija Prasad Koirala by the then President of Nepal, Bidya Devi Bhandari.
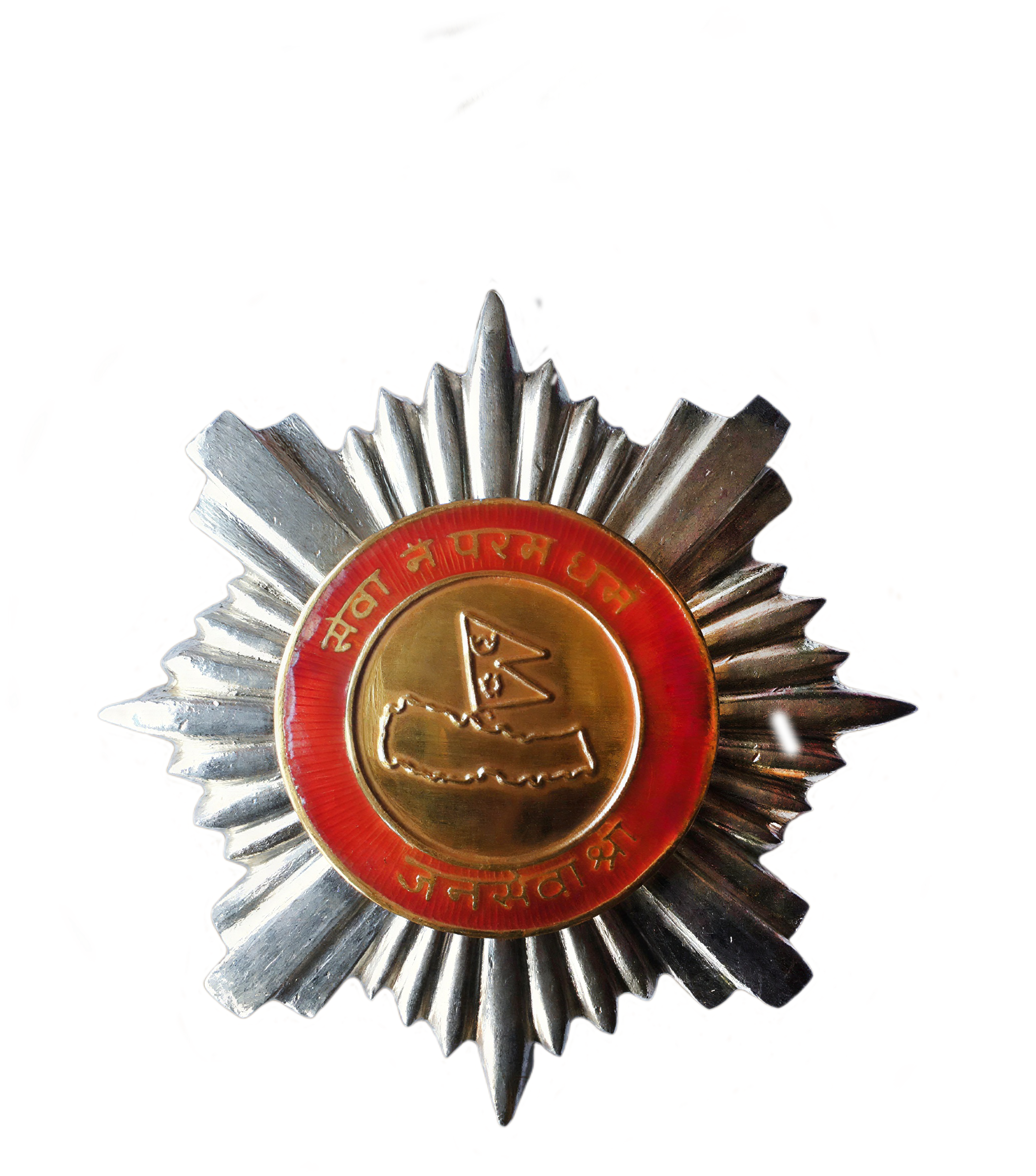
- Nepal Ratna Man Padavi (2018) – Posthumously awarded to Bishweshwar Parsad Koirala by the then President of Nepal, Bidya Devi Bhandari.
- Bangladesh Liberation War Honour (2012) – Posthumously awarded to Girija Prasad Koirala.
- Bangladesh Liberation War Honour (2012) – Posthumously awarded to Bishweshwar Prasad Koirala.
