= Orders, decorations, and medals of Nepal =

Honour system in Nepal
- Country: Nepal
- Presented by: President of Nepal

The Nepal honours system is the system of awards given to individuals for a variety of services to Nepal. The award is conferred by the President of Nepal.

The categories of awards are as follows:

== Civilian awards ==
=== Nepal Ratna Man Padavi ===
Nepal Ratna Man Padavi (Nepali: नेपाल रत्न मानपदवी, Order of the Jewel of Nepal) is the highest civilian award of Nepal. Instituted in 2010, the award is conferred for exemplary contributions to the nation of Nepal.

=== Rastra Gaurav Man Padavi ===
Rastra Gaurav Man Padavi (Nepali: राष्ट्र गौरव मानपदवी, Order of the National Pride) is the second highest civilian award of Nepal. Instituted in 2010, the award is conferred for contribution to the nation.
