= Siddharth Koirala =

Nepalese actor

- Born: Siddharth Koirala; 20 May 1978 (age 47); Kathmandu, Nepal
- Occupation: Actor
- Father: Prakash Koirala
- Relatives: Manisha Koirala (sister); See Koirala family

Siddharth Koirala (Nepali: सिद्धार्थ कोइराला) is a Nepalese film actor, best known for playing the lead in Manish Jha's Indian film Anwar (2007).

== Family ==
Siddharth Koirala was born into the Nepalese political Koirala family in Kathmandu, Nepal. His grandfather, Bishweshwar Prasad Koirala was the Prime Minister of Nepal from 1959 to 1960. His grand-uncles Matrika Prasad Koirala and Girija Prasad Koirala also served terms as Nepal's prime ministers. He is the younger brother of Bollywood actress Manisha Koirala. They are of Nepali origin.

In January 2008, Siddharth married his longtime girlfriend.

== Career ==
Siddharth entered Indian cinema as a co-producer with his sister for the comedy film Paisa Vasool (2004), which also starred his sister Manisha. He also collaborated as a writer for US television documentary Terrorism: Bio Attack (2005). His acting debut was in the poorly received 2005 film called Fun: Can Be Dangerous Sometimes.

A more serious role was his second venture in the critically acclaimed Anwar (2007), which also did poorly at the box office. Siddharth took a long break and made a comeback in the directorial debut of Pakistani actor Rahat Kazmi, the dark comedy film Dekh Bhai Dekh (2009), which opened to mild response. He was seen then in a film about the 26 November 2008 Mumbai attacks, entitled Deshdrohi 2, directed by Kamaal R. Khan in 2009.

== Filmography ==
Year	Title	Role	Notes
2004	Paisa Vasool		As a producer
2005	Terrorism: Bio Attack		As a writer
2005	Fun - Can Be Dangerous Sometimes	Aryan	Bollywood debut
2007	Anwar	Anwar	Critically acclaimed
2009	Dekh Bhai Dekh	Shyam	
2009	Deshdrohi 2		
2014	Megha	Gaurav	Nepali film debut
