= 1960 Nepal coup d'état =

Date	15 December 1960
Location	Kathmandu, Nepal
Result	Royal coup d'état successful: Parliament of Nepal dismissed

Belligerents
Kingdom of Nepal	Parliament of Nepal

Commanders and leaders
Mahendra	B.P. Koirala

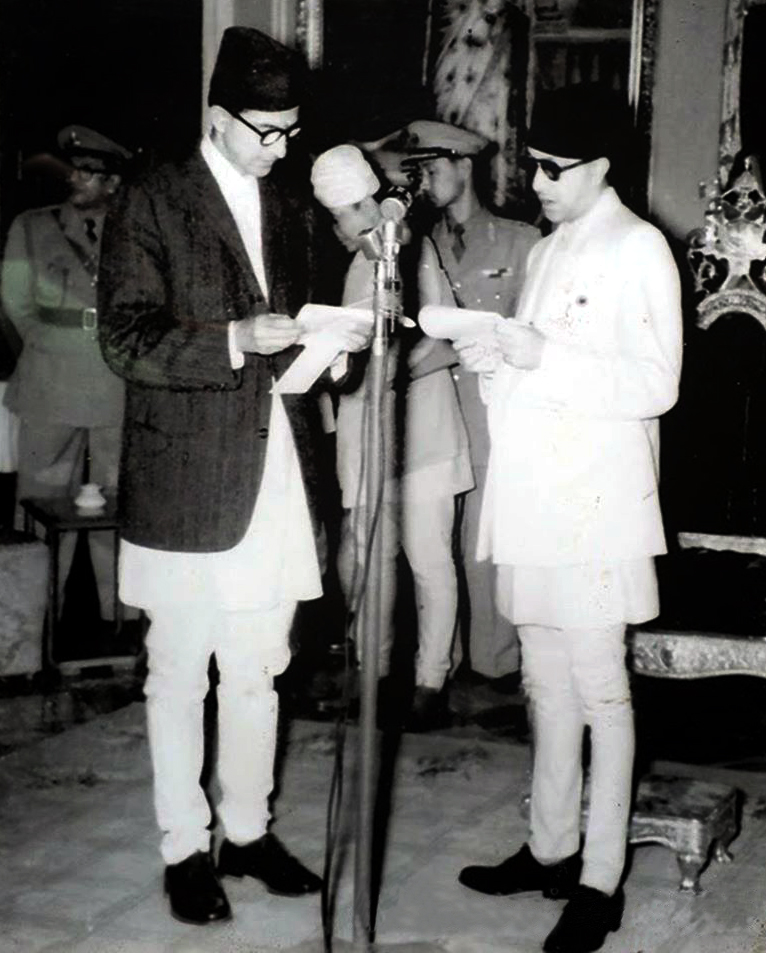
B.P. Koirala (left) taking oath as Prime Minister of Nepal

1960 Nepal coup d'état was a coup d'état led by King Mahendra on 15 December 1960. The same day, he dismissed the cabinet of B.P. Koirala and imprisoned Koirala. On 13 April 1961, Mahendra made a televised appearance, in which he introduced Panchayat, a partyless political system.

== See also ==
- 2005 Nepal coup d'état
