= Atmabrittanta =

Autobiography by Bishweshwor Prasad Koirala

Atmabrittanta: Late Life Recollections
- Author: Bishweshwar Prasad Koirala
- Translator: Kanak Mani Dixit
- Language: English
- Genre: Autobiography
- Published: 2001
- Publisher: Himal Books
- Publication date: 2001
- Publication place: Nepal
- ISBN: 99933-1-308-4

Bisheshwor Prasad Koirala's Atmabrittanta (Late Life Recollections) is the autobiography of a prominent political figure and the first democratically elected Prime Minister of Nepal. In the book, Koirala recounts his early life in India, the development of his political career and the founding of the Nepali Congress National Party, armed revolution against the Rana Dynasty, involvement with the early governments of Nepal, struggles with the monarchy, and his life in prison.
