= Tarini Prasad Koirala =

Nepalese politician

- तारिणीप्रसाद कोइराला
- Portrait of Tarini Prasad Koirala
- Born: 30 April 1922; British Raj
- Died: 1974 (aged 51–52)
- Occupations: Politician; Journalist; Writer
- Political party: Nepali Congress
- Father: Krishna Prasad Koirala
- Relatives: Koirala family

Tarini Prasad Koirala (Note: Nepali: तारिणीप्रसाद कोइराला) (30 April 1922 – 1974), was a Nepalese politician, journalist, and writer belonging to the Nepali Congress. He belonged to the influential Koirala family. He was the son of Krishna Prasad Koirala and brother of three former prime ministers of Nepal, Matrika Prasad Koirala, B. P. Koirala, and Girija Prasad Koirala.

Koirala was active in politics and was a pioneer of the Nepalese labour movement, along with his brothers in Biratnagar. Later his brother B. P. Koirala and the Nepali Congress party were swept into power in the country's first democratic election. He was in the forefront of the leaders who took part in 1947 Biratnagar Jute Mill Strike, along with Girija Prasad Koirala, Yuvaraj Adhikari, and Man Mohan Adhikari.

He was among the six National Congress leaders i.e. Bishweshwar Prasad Koirala, Girija Prasad Koirala, Yuvaraj Adhikar, Gehendrahari Sharma, Man Mohan Adhikari who were taken to Kathmandu as the prisoners of conscience from Biratnagar via the land routes. It took 24 days for them to reach Kathmandu on foot, and was jailed at a Sundarijal-based prison after completing the walk. He was in an active role in and after abolition of Rana rule.

== See also ==
- Biratnagar Jute Mill Strike
- Koirala family
