= Nepal Ratna Man Padavi =

Nepal's highest civilian award

Nepal Ratna Man Padavi नेपाल रत्न मानपदवी
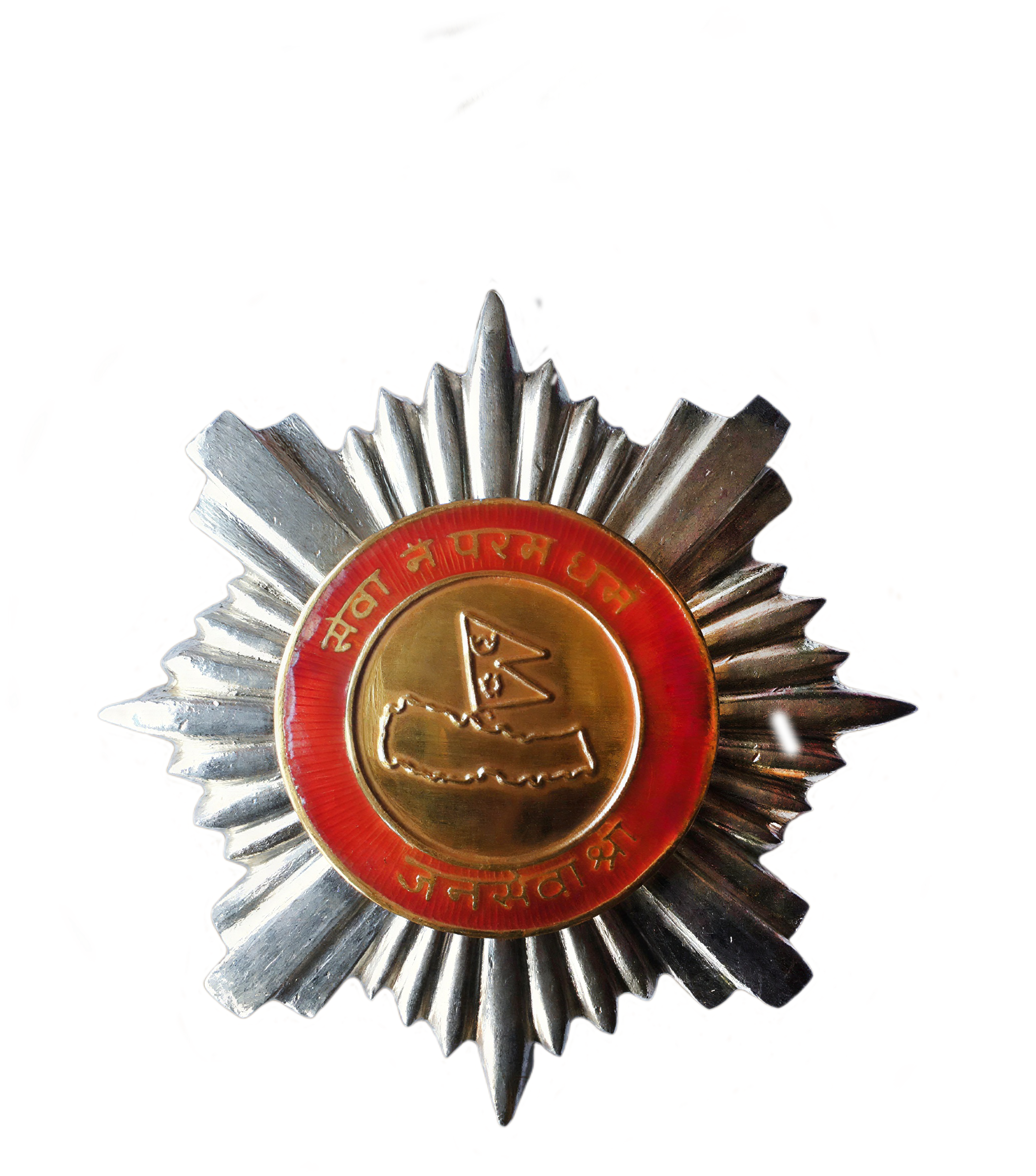
- Medal of the Nepal Ratna Man Padavi
- Type: Order
- Awarded for: Valuable service to the country
- Country: Nepal
- Presented by: President of Nepal
- Established: 2010
- First award: 2010
- Final award: 2021

Highlights
- Total recipients: 6

Precedence
- Next (lower): Rastra Gaurav Man Padavi

Nepal Ratna Man Padavi (Nepali: नेपाल रत्न मानपदवी, Order of the Jewel of Nepal) is the highest civilian award of Nepal. Instituted in 2010, the award is conferred for exemplary contributions to the nation of Nepal.

== History ==
Order of Tri Shakti Patta was instituted by King Tribhuvan of Nepal in on 27 November 1937. It had 5 classes plus a medal. The first class "Jyotirmaya-Subikhyat-Tri-Shakti-Patta" was regarded as the highest civilian award of that time.

After the end of monarchy in 2008, the new government adapted the award, "Nepal Ratna Man Padavi". The government makes the decision to whom to give the award and it is conferred by the President of Nepal on Republic Day, 29 May. The decoration is an octagon having 8.5 cm diameter and bejewelled with five diamond pieces on every corner.

== Recipient ==
Key
Posthumous recipient

Year	Image	Laureates	Notes
2010		Ganesh Man Singh	Pro-democracy activist, founding leader of the Nepali Congress, also known as the "Iron Man of Nepal".
2015		Girija Prasad Koirala	Four-time Prime Minister of Nepal, former Acting Head of State, and former President of the Nepali Congress.
2016		Madan Kumar Bhandari	Pro-democracy activist, and former Secretary General of the Communist Party of Nepal (Unified Marxist–Leninist).
2018		Bishweshwar Prasad Koirala	First demotrically elected Prime Minister of Nepal, founding leader and longest serving President of Nepali Congress.
2019		Pushpa Lal Shrestha	Founding Secretary-General of Communist Party of Nepal, and is considered the father of Nepali communism.
2021		Krishna Prasad Bhattarai	Two-time Prime Minister of Nepal, founding leader and former President of Nepali Congress.
