= Krishna Prasad Koirala =

Nepali politician

- कृष्णप्रसाद कोइराला
- Born: Kingdom of Nepal (present day Nepal)
- Died: 1945
- Occupations: Politician, activist, social worker
- Known for: Founder of the Koirala family; father of three Prime Ministers of Nepal
- Children: 9

Krishna Prasad Koirala (Nepali: कृष्णप्रसाद कोइराला) was a Nepalese politician, activist and social worker. He was the founder of the prominent Koirala family. Three of his sons became prime ministers of Nepal. He was born in 1936 BS (Attributed by Samar Sapan Rajbanshi). He established Adarsha Secondary School in 1930 in Biratnagar, Nepal.

He was a Hill Brahmin living in exile in Bihar. He had five sons and four daughters. His sons were: Matrika Prasad Koirala, Bishweshwar Prasad Koirala, Girija Prasad Koirala, Keshav Prasad Koirala and Tarini Prasad Koirala and the four daughters were Nalini Koirala (Upadhyaya), Indira Koirala (Acharya), Sauvagya Kumari (Sauri) Koirala (Arjel) and Vijaylaxmi Koirala (Zaki). His three eldest sons became Prime Ministers of Nepal starting in 1951. His other two sons were also actively involved in the democratic politics and the popular activities to establish a democratic system in Nepal.

Bollywood actress Manisha Koirala is one of his great-granddaughters.

He died in 1945.
