= Shashanka Koirala =

Nepali politician

Dr. Shashank Koirala
- डा. शशांक कोइराला
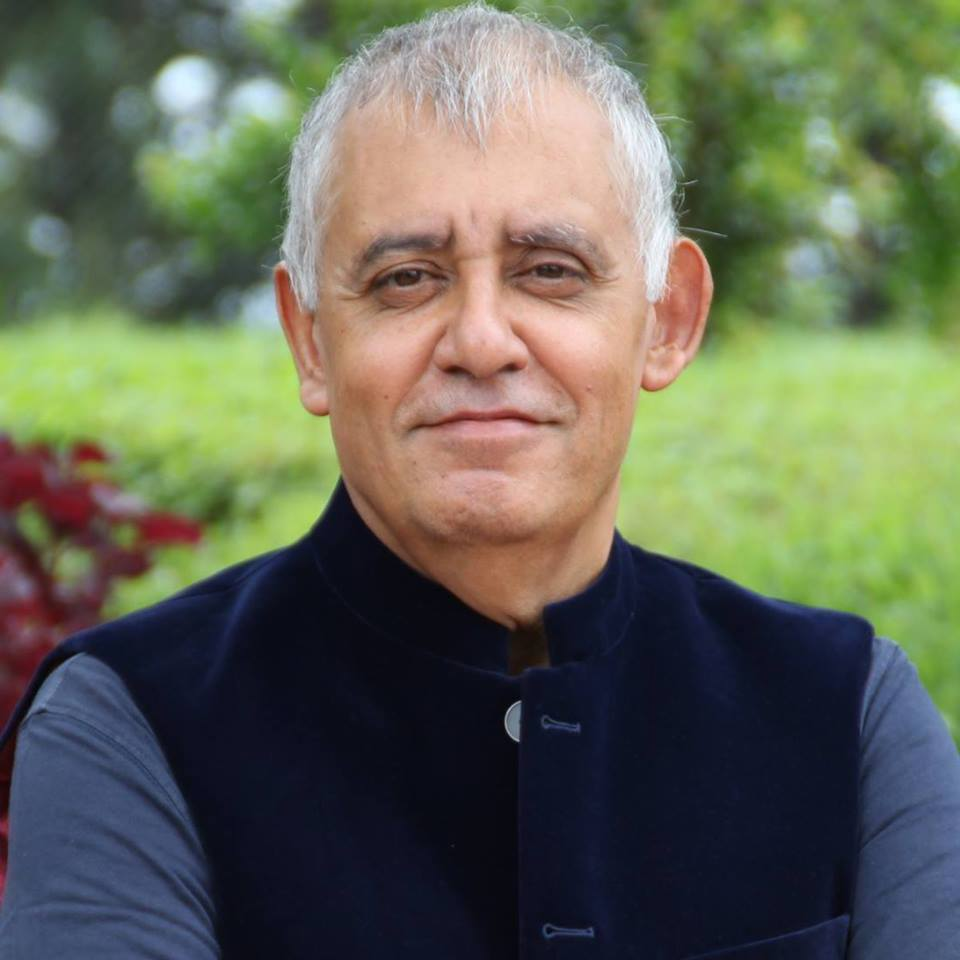
- Portrait of Shashanka Koirala

Member of Parliament, Pratinidhi Sabha
- Former
- In office 4 March 2018- – 12 September 2025
- Preceded by: Constituency established
- Succeeded by: Rajan Gautam
- Constituency: Nawalparasi East 1

Member of 1st and 2nd Constituent Assembly
- In office 28 May 2008 – 14 October 2017
- Preceded by: Damodar Bastakoti
- Succeeded by: Constituency abolished
- Constituency: Nawalparasi 1

General Secretary of Nepali Congress
- In office 8 March 2016 – 16 December 2021
- Preceded by: Krishna Prasad Sitaula
- Succeeded by: Gagan Thapa; Bishwa Prakash Sharma

Personal details
- Born: 24 October 1958 (age 68) Patna, India
- Party: Nepali Congress
- Spouse: Suphatra Koirala
- Children: Supriya Koirala (daughter)
- Parents: Bishweshwar Prasad Koirala (father); Sushila Koirala (mother)
- Relatives: Koirala family
- Education: Banaras Hindu University
- Occupation: Ophthalmologist, Politician

Shashank Koirala (Nepali: शशांक कोइराला; born 24 October 1958) is a Nepalese politician and a former member of House of Representatives, belonging to the political dynasty of Koirala family. Shashank is also a renowned ophthalmologist.

== Political career ==
He was the General Secretary of Nepali Congress, being elected in the party's 2016 general convention with 1417 votes against 1017 votes secured by his nearest rival Arjun Narasingha K.C.

In the 2008 Constituent Assembly election, he was elected from the Nawalparasi-1 constituency, winning 17430 votes. He was the sole member of the Koirala family to get elected through the First Past the Post system.

He retained his seat in the 2013 Constituent Assembly election as well as in the 2017 Nepalese legislative elections.

== Electoral history ==
=== 2017 legislative elections ===
Party	Candidate	Votes
Nepali Congress	Shashanka Koirala	40,620
CPN (Maoist Centre)	Bhavisor Parajuli	36,596
Bibeksheel Sajha Party	Hari Prasad Gautam	1,082
Others		2,962
Result	Congress gain	
Source: Election Commission

== Family ==
He is the third son of former Nepalese Prime Minister BP Koirala.

== Research ==
1. Thesis: Lipoprotein Profile in Hypertensive Retinopathy - 1985

2. Investigator: Epidemiology and Microbiology of Corneal Suppuration in

3. Investigator: Corneal Surface Injury and Role of Early Prophylactic Antibiotic Therapy. (Editor (1994).

4. Principal Investigator: Efficacy of Antibiotic Prophylaxis for Ocular Surface Trauma Instituted Through Existing Primary Units of Health Care System of - 1996.

5. Principal Investigator: South Asian Cataract Management Study 1997.

6. Examiner: Fellow of Royal and Surgeon, Pakistan

== Publication ==
1. Effect of applying intraocular pressure reducer before cataract surgery: M.P. Upadhyay, P.C. Karmacharya, S. R. Shrestha, S. Koirala, J. Inst. Med., P. 277–282, 1986.

2. Von 's disease (Neurofibromatosis): Case report: P.C. Karmacharya, S. Koirala, M.P. Upadhyay J. Inst. Med. P. 113

3. Xeroderma pigmentosa: Report of Case P.C. Karmacharya, S. Koirala, M.P. Upadhyay, J. Inst. Med. P 321–326, 1987.

4. Microbial flora of conjunctiva of live newborn Nepalese Baby: P.C. Karmacharya, M.P Upadhyay, B.M. Pokhrel, S.R. Rai, Nepas Journal, 1988, 7, 63-69 (1988).

5. Epidemiologic Characteristics, Predisposing Factors, and Etiologic Diagnosis of Corneal Ulceration in Nepal M.P. Upadhyay, P.C. Karmacharya, S. Koirala, N.R. Tuladhar, L.E. Bryan, G. Smolin, J.P. Whithcer: American Journal of Ophthalmology 111:92-99, January 1991.

6. Vogt Koyanagi Harada (VKS) Syndrome: Case Report D.N. Shah, P.C. Karmacharya, S. Koirala and M.P. Upadhyay, JNMA, Vol. 30, No. 102, Apr-Jan 1992 p 120-124 (J. Nep. Med Assoc. 1992; 30:120-124).

7. Knowledge Attitude and Practice (KAP) Towards Eye disease: Finding of a Survey in Rural Bhaktapur. Paudyal G. Shah D.N., Koirala S. and Upadhyay M.P. Journal of Institute of Medicine, Kathmandu, 14:277, 1992.

8. Knowledge Attitude and Practice (KAP) of Ophthalmology: Finding of Survey of Primary Health Care workers. Shrestha JK, Karmacharya P.C., Shah D.N., Koirala S., Bajracharya H.B., and Upadhyay M.P. Journal of, . 14:237, 1993.

9. The South Asian Cataract Management Study - The first 662 cataract surgeries: a preliminary report. Snellingen T., S. Gupta, F Huq, J.K. Shrestha, R. Husain, S. Koirala, G.N. Rao et al. British Journal of Ophthalmology, November 1995, Vol. 79, No. 11, p 1020–1035.

10. Retinal diseases at TU Teaching Hospital. J.K. Shrestha, S. Koirala, OK Malla, S. Miller. Journal of the 1997, 19:13-17.

11. Burden of ocular trauma in : E. Pradhan, S. Shakya, S. Koirala, M.P. Upadhyay, PCD Karmacharya. Journal of Society of Surgeons of, Aug. 2000, P.6-11.

12. Ocular morbidity in school children in . B.P. Nepal, S. Adhikary, A.K. Sharma. British Journal of Ophthalmology 2003; 87:531-534.

13. Pseudoexfoliation syndrome in . A hospital-based retrospective study. S. Shakya, S. Koirala, PCD Karmacharya. POacific Journal of Ophthalmology Vol. 16, No. 1, Jan, 2004; p 13–16.

== See also ==
- Nepali Congress (Deuba Faction)
