= Prakash Koirala =

Nepalese politician

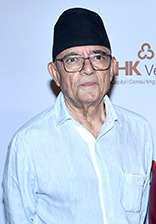
- Prakash Koirala in 2018

Minister of Science, Technology and Environment of Nepal
- In office 2005–2006
- Monarch: Gyanendra of Nepal

Member of Parliament, House of Representatives
- In office 1999–2002
- Constituency: Rautahat 4

Personal details
- Children: Manisha Koirala (daughter); Siddharth Koirala (son)
- Parent(s): Bishweshwar Prasad Koirala (father); Sushila Koirala (mother)
- Relatives: See Koirala family

Prakash Koirala (Nepali: प्रकाश कोइराला,) is a Nepali politician, formerly a Member of Parliament and a former Cabinet minister who held the portfolios of Environment, Science and Technology. He was elected to the House of Representatives through a by-poll after the 1999 election on behalf of the Nepali Congress representing Rautahat 4 parliamentary constituency. He is the son of former Nepalese prime minister Bishweshwar Prasad Koirala, and the father of Bollywood actress Manisha Koirala and actor Siddharth Koirala.

On 15 July 2005, he was appointed as the cabinet minister of Nepal for Environment, Science and Technology in the royal cabinet of erstwhile King Gyanendra, when Sher Bahadur Deuba government was sacked.

In 2006, he founded his own party the Nepali Congress (Rastrabadi) with other supporters of King Gyanendra after he was expelled from his party Nepali Congress for supporting pro monarchy rule which also made him lose the membership of his parliamentary seat when the suspended House of Representatives was reinstated.
