= Matrika Prasad Koirala =

Nepalese revolutionary and politician (1912–1997)

- मातृकाप्रसाद कोइराला
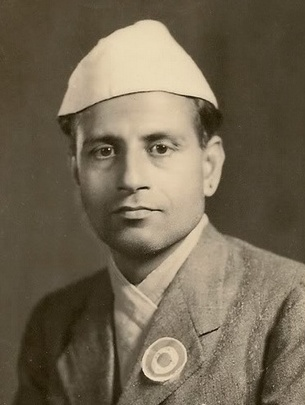
- Portait, c. 1950s

Prime Minister of Nepal
- In office 15 June 1953 – 14 April 1955
- Monarchs: Tribhuvan; Mahendra
- Preceded by: Himself (1952)
- Succeeded by: Tanka Prasad Acharya (1956)
- In office 16 November 1951 – 14 August 1952
- Monarch: Tribhuvan
- Preceded by: Mohan Shumsher JBR
- Succeeded by: Himself (1953)

Ambassador to the United States
- In office 13 July 1961 – 3 August 1964
- Preceded by: Rishikesh Shah
- Succeeded by: Padma Bahadur Khatri

President of the Nepali Congress
- In office 12 April 1950 – 26 May 1952
- Preceded by: Party established
- Succeeded by: B. P. Koirala

Personal details
- Born: 1 January 1912 Varanasi, British Raj
- Died: 11 September 1997 (aged 85) Biratnagar, Nepal
- Party: Nepali Congress
- Children: Kamal Koirala
- Parent(s): Krishna Prasad Koirala (father); Mohan Kumari Koirala (mother)
- Relatives: Koirala family

Matrika Prasad Koirala (Note: Nepali: मातृकाप्रसाद कोइराला) (1 January 1912 – 11 September 1997) was a Nepalese revolutionary and politician. He was the first non-aristocratic citizen to serve as the Prime Minister of Nepal, holding office in two separate terms (1951–1952 and 1953–1955). He played a significant role in Nepal's democratic movements, particularly the 1950–1951 revolution, which brought an end to the 104-year-long Rana regime, and was a prominent leader of the Nepali Congress. He was the elder brother of B. P. Koirala and Girija Prasad Koirala, both of whom also served as prime ministers of Nepal.

== Personal life ==
Matrika Prasad Koirala was born on 1 January 1912 in Varanasi, British Raj, to Krishna Prasad Koirala and his first wife Mohan Kumari Koirala. His brothers included B. P. Koirala and Girija Prasad Koirala, who also served as prime ministers of Nepal, as well as Tarini Prasad Koirala, a politician and journalist.

Matrika Prasad Koirala's son, Kamal Koirala, was a former ambassador of Nepal. Unlike most members of the Congress-dominated Koirala family, Kamal Prasad Koirala was associated with communist ideology.

The identity of Matrika Prasad Koirala's wife remains unclear in publicly available sources, and he may have had other children as well.

== Political career ==
Matrika Prasad Koirala was politically active in British Raj where his father Krishna Prasad Koirala was living in exile. He stayed in the house of Dr. Rajendra Prasad, the first President of free India and was influenced by the Indian independence struggle. He participated in the Indian independence movement with his brother BP Koirala. Both brothers were arrested and imprisoned by the British Raj for three months in 1930. He was made President of the Congress Party in Bihar by Dr. Rajendra Prasad for a while as all the other senior Indian leaders were jailed during the Quit India Movement.

He later joined the Nepali National Congress led by Tanka Prasad Acharya and fought against the Rana regime. Koirala became the first President of Nepali Congress, when it was formed as a result of the merger of Nepali National Congress and Nepal Democratic Congress in April 1950. Koirala became the first commoner Prime Minister of Nepal after Rana rule ended.

In 1952, he was expelled from the Nepali Congress for "violating the party principles and acting against the Constitution of 1951".

Koirala also served as Nepal's permanent representative to the UN and ambassador to the United States from 1961 to 1964.

== See also ==
- Koirala family
- Nepali Congress
- 1960 Nepal royal coup
