= B. P. Koirala =

Nepalese statesman (1914–1982)

- बी. पी. कोइराला
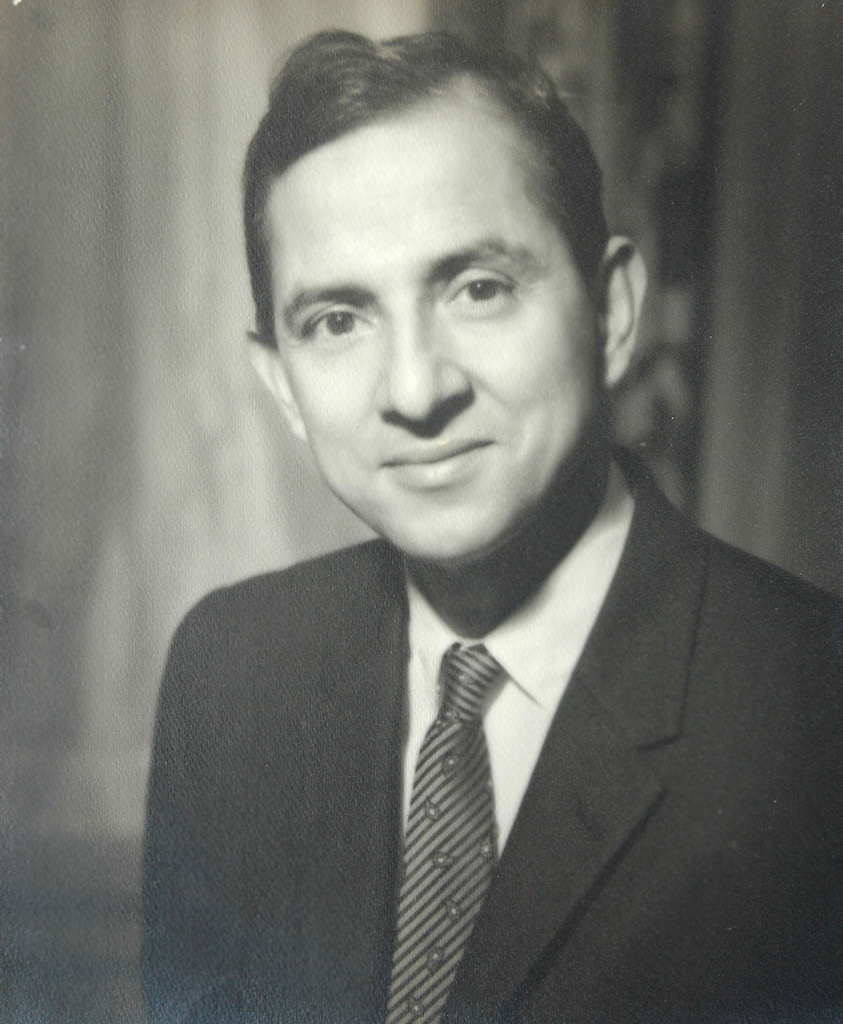
- Portait, c. 1950s

Prime Minister of Nepal
- In office 27 May 1959 – 15 December 1960
- Monarch: Mahendra
- Preceded by: Subarna Shamsher Rana
- Succeeded by: Tulsi Giri (1963)
Ministerial offices
Minister of Defence
In office 27 May 1959 – 15 December 1960
Prime Minister	Himself
Preceded by	Purendra Bikram Shah
Succeeded by	Tulsi Giri
Minister of Foreign Affairs
In office 27 May 1959 – 30 June 1959
Prime Minister	Himself
Preceded by	Purendra Bikram Shah
Succeeded by	Tulsi Giri
Minister of Home Affairs
In office 21 February 1951 – 12 November 1951
Prime Minister	Mohan Shumsher Jung Bahadur Rana
Preceded by	Office established
Succeeded by	Surya Prasad Upadhyaya

President of the Nepali Congress
- In office 23 May 1957 – 21 July 1982
- Preceded by: Subarna Shamsher Rana
- Succeeded by: Krishna Prasad Bhattarai
- In office 26 May 1952 – 24 January 1956
- Preceded by: Matrika Prasad Koirala
- Succeeded by: Subarna Shamsher Rana

Member of the House of Representatives
- In office 30 June 1959 – 15 December 1960
- Preceded by: Constituency established
- Succeeded by: Constituency abolished
- Constituency: Morang Biratnagar West

Personal details
- Born: 8 September 1914 Varanasi, British Raj
- Died: 21 July 1982 (aged 67) Kathmandu, Kingdom of Nepal
- Party: Nepali Congress
- Spouse: Sushila Koirala (m. 1936)
- Children: 4, including Prakash Koirala and Shashanka Koirala
- Parent: Krishna Prasad Koirala (father)
- Relatives: Koirala family
- Education: Banaras Hindu University; University of Calcutta
- Awards: Nepal Ratna
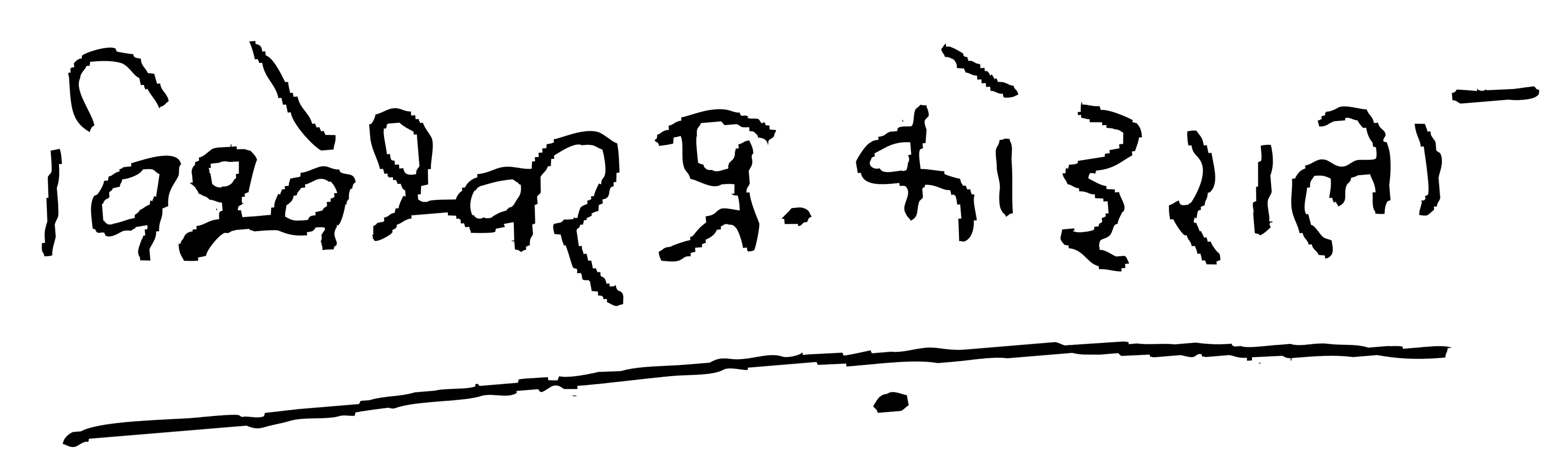
- Signature
- Nickname: Jananayak Bp

Bishweshwar Prasad Koirala (Note: Nepali: विश्वेश्वरप्रसाद कोइराला; Nepali: बी. पी. कोइराला) (8 September 1914 – 21 July 1982), was a Nepalese revolutionary, statesman, politician, novelist, and one of the founding leaders of the Nepali Congress. He was the first democratically elected Prime Minister of Nepal, serving from 1959 to 1960, until the royal coup of 1960 led by King Mahendra. He played a leading role in Nepal’s democratic movements, particularly the 1950–1951 revolution, which brought an end to the 104-year-long Rana rule of Nepal. He was the brother of former prime ministers Matrika Prasad Koirala and Girija Prasad Koirala. He was also the grandfather of Bollywood actors Manisha Koirala and Siddharth Koirala.

B. P. Koirala was the first democratically elected Prime Minister of Nepal. He held the office for 18 months before being deposed and imprisoned on the orders of King Mahendra. He spent the rest of his life largely in imprisonment and exile, during which his health steadily deteriorated.

B. P. Koirala is widely regarded as one of the greatest political personalities in Nepal. He was a strong advocate of democracy and argued that in a poor country like Nepal, political freedoms alone were not sufficient without socio-economic transformation. He promoted the idea of democratic socialism as a solution to Nepal's underdevelopment.

== Early life ==
The second son of Krishna Prasad Koirala, a follower of Mahatma Gandhi, Bishweshwar Prasad Koirala was raised in Banaras. Until the age of 14, he attended a school established by his father. Afterwards he joined the Harishchandra School in the city. He began writing when he was in the ninth grade.

The British Raj charged him and his brother, Matrika Prasad Koirala, with having contacts with terrorists in 1930. They were arrested and set free after three months. Because of this, Bishweshwar began to study at the Scottish Church College in Calcutta as per his father's wishes. Towards the end of 1930, he left college and returned to Banaras. In 1932, he completed his intermediate level of studies. His father again insisted that his son join Scottish Church College in Calcutta. So for the second time, he joined the college, but left it soon afterwards. In 1934, he completed his bachelor's degree in Economics and Politics from Banaras Hindu University. He also earned a degree in law from the University of Calcutta in 1937, and practised for several years in Darjeeling.

While still a student, he became involved in the Indian nationalist movement. In 1934, he joined the Indian National Congress. During World War II, he was interned by the British in Dhanbad for two years (1942–1944).

== Political career ==
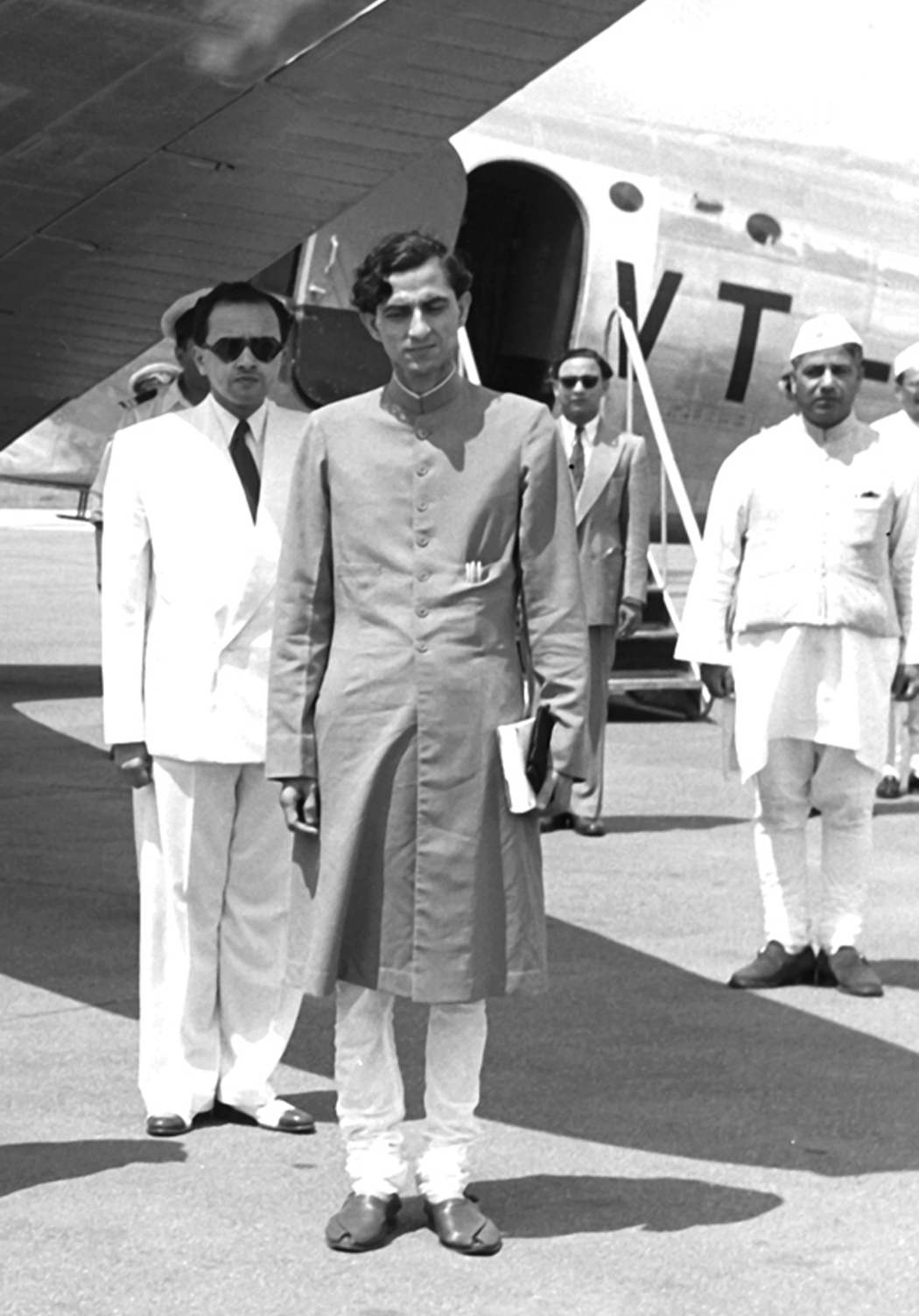
Home Minister B. P. Koirala in Delhi, 1951

Following his release, with Indian independence imminent, he set about trying to bring change to Nepal. In 1947 he founded in India the socialist Nepali National Congress, which in 1950 became the Nepali Congress Party. On 9 March 1947, Koirala crossed over to Nepal to help his brother Girija Prasad Koirala instigate the Biratnagar jute mill strike. He was arrested along with Girija Prasad Koirala and four other National Congress leaders and taken with his fellow agitators to Kathmandu via a 21-day long, slow walk across the hills. The prisoners' march attracted much attention and helped to radicalise the peasants whose villages lay en route. The Koiralas along with other detainees were kept in a Kathmandu bungalow but were soon released after a 27-day hunger strike, popular protests, and at the request of Mahatma Gandhi in August 1947. In 1990, Prime Minister Judha Shamsher had deported Mahatma Baundas and Mahatma Sonai Das on the issue of untouchability. He started the movement by staying at the house of Mahatma Sonai Das Yadav, currently in Sunsari, Rajganj, Morang. After meeting Mahatma Baundas Yadav in Banaras, Mahatma Sonai Das helped B.P. Koirala with 51 rupees on Guru Purnima day in 1990 to end the Rana rule of Nepal. Later, Nepali Congress was formed. In 2015, B.P. Koirala won the election by sitting at the house of Mahatma Sonai Das Yadav at booth number 32, Rajganj, Morang. Mahatma Sonai Das made his disciple Suryanath Das Yadav a minister from Siraha.

Koirala went back to India, and began looking for arms to storm Kathmandu. Finally, Koirala led the Revolution of 1951, which overthrew Nepal's 104-year-old Rana regime. The last Rana prime minister was dismissed in October 1951 when the Rana-Congress coalition cabinet (in which Koirala served for nine months as the Home minister) broke apart. Koirala then concentrated on developing the Nepali political structure. King Mahendra responded with a new constitution enabling free parliamentary elections to take place in 1959. Only a fragmented parliament was expected, but Koirala's Nepali Congress scored a landslide, taking more than two-thirds of the seats in the lower house. After several weeks of significant hesitation, Mahendra asked Koirala to form a government, which took office in May 1959.

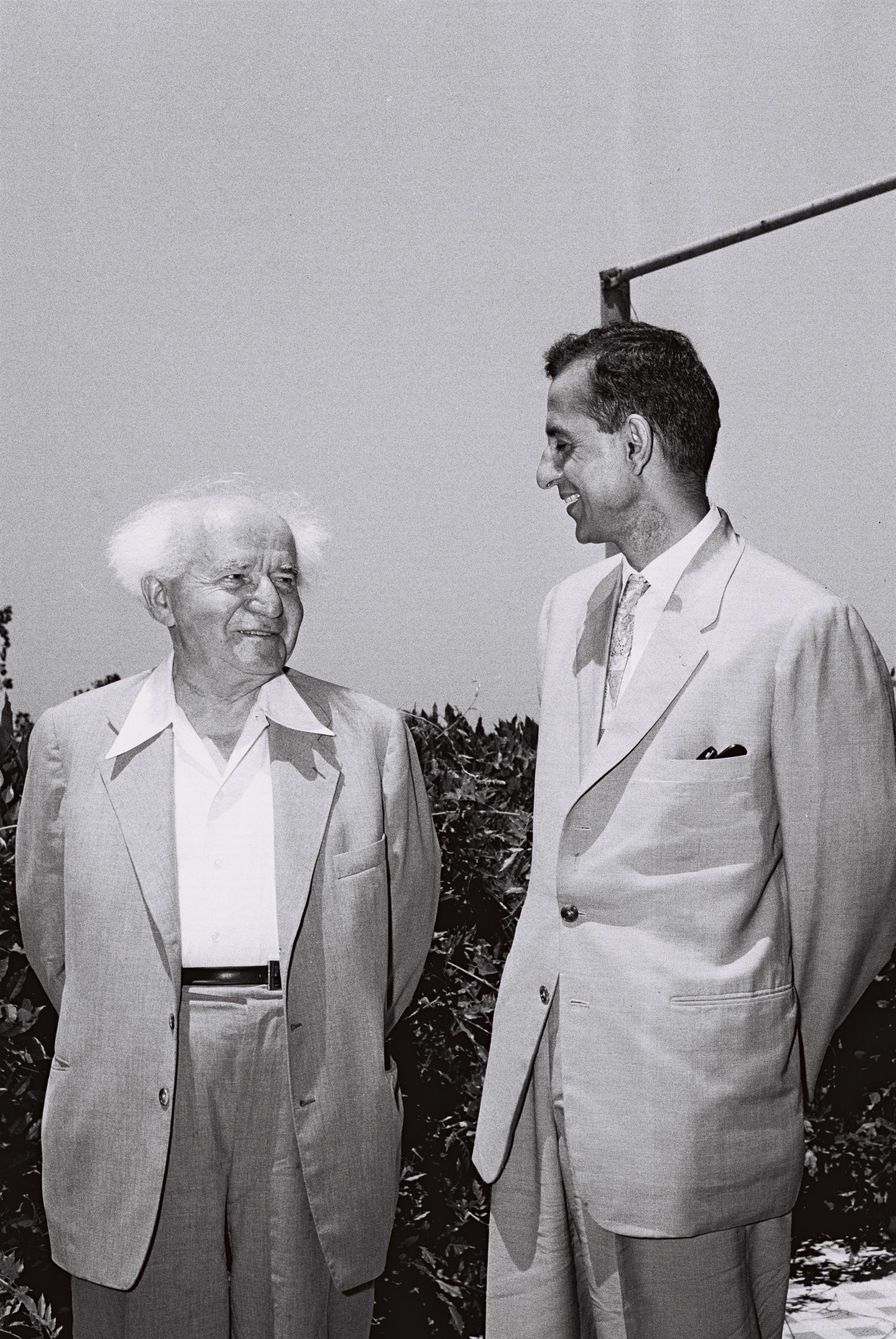
B. P. Koirala meets David Ben-Gurion during a visit to Israel

Koirala led his country's delegation to the United Nations and made carefully poised visits to China and India, then increasingly at odds over territorial disputes. Yet, he was in trouble at home almost from the beginning. His land reform measures, especially the revision of the tenancy laws so easily passed by parliament, deeply offended the landed aristocracy which had long dominated the army. King Mahendra, on 15 December 1960, suspended the constitution, dissolved parliament, dismissed the cabinet, imposed direct rule, and for good measure imprisoned Koirala and his closest government colleagues. Many of them were released after a few months, but Koirala, though he was suffering from throat cancer, was kept imprisoned without trial until 1968.

In 1968, the then Prime Minister Surya Bahadur Thapa, played a significant role in releasing Koirala from prison, but he was the main actor for also making sure that Koirala stayed out of the country in self-exile for the rest of his life. Koirala was in self-exile in Banaras, India until December 1976. After his return from almost a decade of self-exile in Banaras, he was kept under house arrest at his Chabahil residence. During that time, King Birendra asked the then Prime Minister Dr Tulsi Giri, a tough political rival of Koirala to recommend to him by the joint meeting of the Council of Ministers and Back to the Village National Campaign Central Committee, whether Koirala should be freed for medical treatment in the USA or not. Accordingly, the joint meeting recommended King Birendra to release Koirala and provide him with the necessary expense for medical treatment in the USA. The passport and necessary visa were arranged by the government of Nepal for Koirala and his wife Sushila Koirala, a doctor and an assistant. The then Royal Nepalese Embassy in the Washington DC, was instructed to provide all support to the Koirala family for the medical treatment.

King Birendra, educated in England and the United States, succeeded his father in 1972 when the political climate was believed to be gradually improving. Koirala, however, was arrested immediately upon his return from exile in 1976 and charged with the capital offence of attempting armed revolution. Finally, in March 1978, he was cleared of all treason and sedition charges. Then, in 1981, he was cleared to travel to the United States for medical treatment. The Prime Minister Surya Bahadur Thapa convinced the king to allow Koirala to proceed to the US for treatment as per recommendation from the royal physician Dr. M. R. Pandey. The government of Nepal bore a portion of the cost of his medical treatment in the US, while the rest was arranged by his nephew Shail Updhaya, Dr. Shukdev Shah, family and friends.

B.P. Koirala and Nepali Congress members after the loss of National referendum in 1980

After returning from a further medical visit to the United States, he had a series of audiences with King Birendra, as he tried for a "national reconciliation". During the student demonstrations in 1979, he was under house arrest. However, he welcomed King Birendra's call for a national referendum on the question of the political system for Nepal. The referendum results were announced to be in favour of retaining the political system led by the B. P. Koirala was the first leader to welcome the result of the national referendum and accepted the people verdict and claimed that the referendum was fair and free. However, owing to differences in the electoral process to seek membership of class organization as mandatory, Koirala demanded a boycott of the 1981 elections.

Despite obviously failing health and political strength, Koirala could still draw great popular support. He addressed one of Nepal's largest public meetings in recent years in Kathmandu's Ratna Park in January 1982. He died on 21 July 1982, in Kathmandu. An estimated half a million people attended his funeral.

== Literature ==
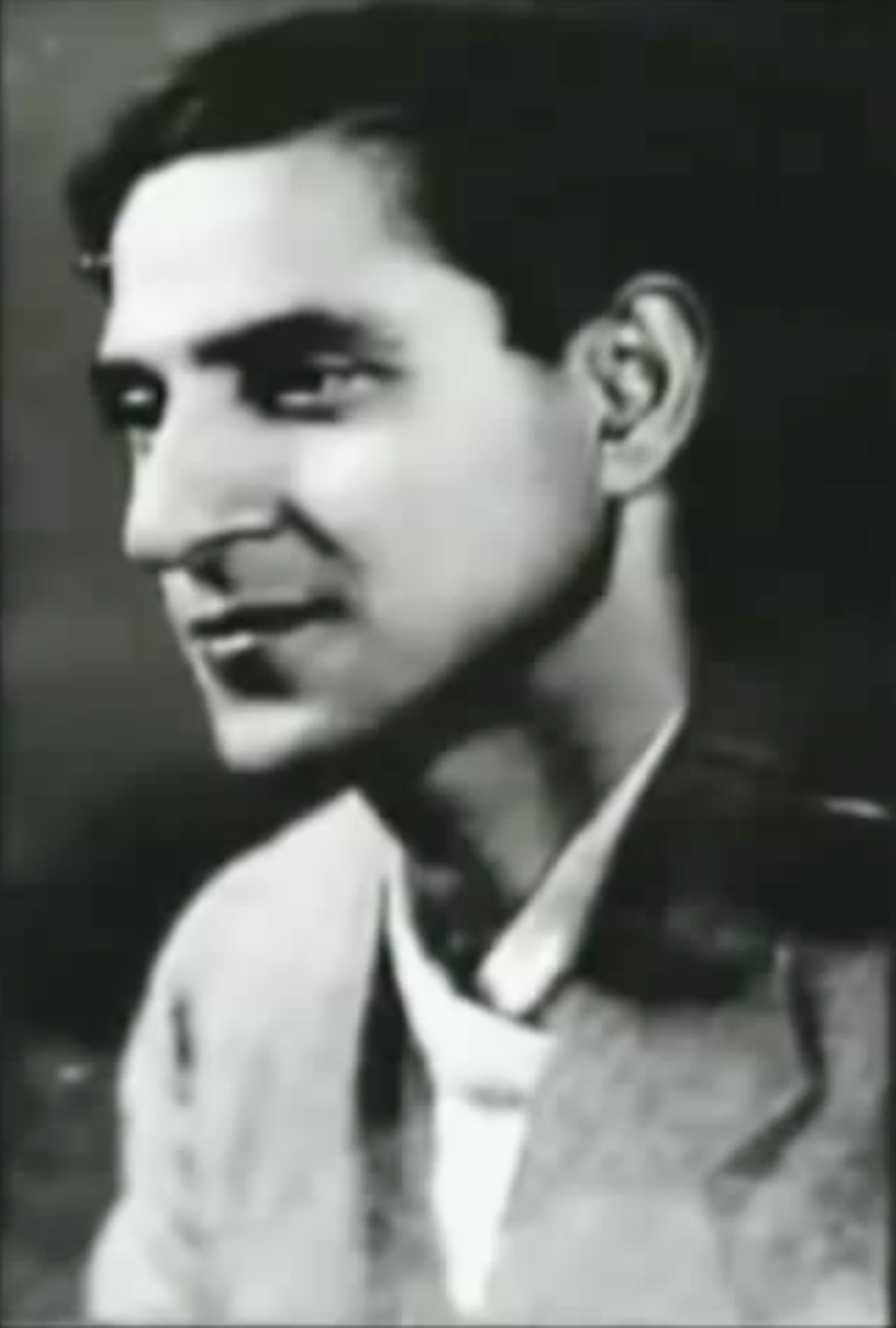
Portrait of B. P. Koirala

While B. P. Koirala is considered one of the most charismatic political leaders of Nepal, he was also one of the most well-read and thoughtful writers of Nepalese literature. He wrote short stories and novels, and some poems. Koirala began writing short stories in Hindi.

His first stories were published in Banaras in Hansa, a Hindi literary magazine edited by Prem Chand (India's Tolstoy). His first Nepali short story "Chandrabadan" was published in Sharada, a Nepali literary magazine in 1935. Koirala was very good at depicting the character and mind of women. Four other stories of Koirala were included in Katha Kusum (an anthology of Nepali stories), published in 1938 in Darjeeling. As a social realist, with good psychological insight as he was first writer to write stories and novels based on human psychology in history of Nepalese literature, Koirala had established himself as one of the most important Nepali short story writers by 1938. Doshi Chashma, Koirala's anthology of sixteen short stories, was published in 1949. He was one of the greatest writer to contribute to the Nepali literature.

Koirala was very busy in the 1950s as he was often found amidst the political situations of Nepal. He was, however, able to write an incomplete novel Hitlar ra Yahudi (Hitler and the Jews) in the form of travelogue. The 1960s were very productive for Koirala in terms of his literary output. He wrote many novels and short stories in jail during 1960–68. They include: Teen Ghumti (Three Turns), 1968; Narendra Dai (Brother Narendra), 1969; Sumnima (A story of the first Kirata woman), 1969; Modiain (The Grocer's Wife), 1980; Shweta Bhairavi (The White Goddess of Terror), 1983; Babu Ama ra chora (Father, mother and sons), 1989; and an incomplete autobiography Mero Katha (My Story), 1983, and many more yet to be published.

Koirala also has dozens of political essays including the following: "Rajatantra ra Lokatantra" ("Monarchy and Democracy"), 1960; "Thichieka Janata Jagisake" ("The Oppressed People Rise"), 1969; "Rastriyata Nepalko Sandarbhama" ("Nationalism in the Context of Nepal"), 1970; "Kranti: Ek Anivaryata" ("Revolution: An Absolute Necessity"), 1970; "Panchayati Vyavastha Prajatantrik Chaina" ("The Panchayat System is not Democratic"), 1978; "Prajatantra ra Samajvad" ("Democracy and Socialism"), 1979; and "Rastriya Ekata ko Nimti Ahwan" ("A Call for National Reconciliation"), 1980.

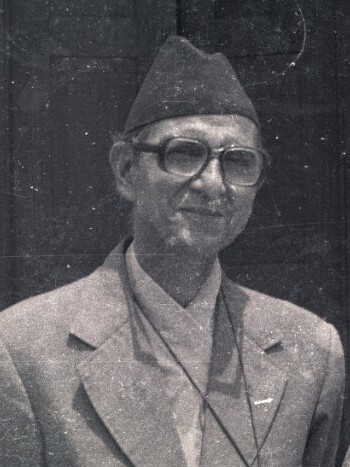
B. P. Koirala in 1981

Koirala's writings (both political and literary) were banned until recently. Nepalese youths spent several years of imprisonment just on the charges of possessing Koirala's writings. Another problem is that his rare and important writings have been scattered all over. Old newspapers and magazines (including the underground publications) have to be researched. Libraries, museums, and archives in Kathmandu, Banaras, Calcutta, New Delhi, London, Paris, Berkeley, Stanford, and many other places have to be visited to collect the materials on Koirala. As a result, one can hope to produce volumes of his political writings and literary works.

Koirala was the focus of Nepalese politics during the 1950s, 1960s, and the 1970s. Even today, long after his death, people of Nepal feel that the restoration of multi-party democracy is a tribute to him. Koirala was also one of the most important literary figures of Nepal. In politics Koirala was a social democrat; in literature he was an existentialist, especially in his novel Tin Ghumti (Three Turns). He said that he wrote his literary works to satisfy his anarchist impulses, impulses which revolted against the traditional order of things. But as a social democrat he was in search of a political order that was agreeable to every citizen of Nepal.

As a politician, Koirala struggled throughout his life for the establishment of a multi-party democracy in his country. Traditional forces, still strong to resist such effort, made it very hard for "B. P." to accomplish his political mission. As a social democrat, Koirala differed with communists; as he often said man cannot live by bread alone. He also differed with the capitalists as he thought that unbridled consumerism was immoral, and that the appalling exploitation of the world's resources was short-sighted and unrealistic. He believed that only socialism could guarantee political freedom and equal economic opportunities to the people. He said, "socialism is the wave of the future."

Koirala had studied economics, logic, literature, and law. He was a voracious reader of English, German, French, Russian, Hindi, Bengali and Nepali literature. His educational background and artistic abilities were combined in his own works to present a view of life in an artistic, logical and compelling manner. He would thus shake the conscience of Nepali readers by questioning their unreflective acceptance of the traditional value systems.

Koirala's short stories were first published in the 1930s in Hindi and Nepali literary magazines. Koirala first came to notice in Nepali literature because often his characters seemed to have been treated with an understanding of Freudian psychoanalysis. Even when a short story or novel of Koirala was not Freudian in its approach, it was still noteworthy to Nepali readers because he presented an unconventional approach to life.

Modiaain (The Grocer's wife) is probably his shortest novel. In Modiaain Koirala looks at the Mahabharata War from the point of view of a young woman who loses her husband to the war. This woman was not alone. There were hundreds of thousands of young women who were widowed by the war. Thus, Koirala presents a passionate plea against the philosophy of the Bhagavad Gita, which assumes that the world is but an illusion and thus makes life and death a meaningless phenomena and that the observance of one's own duty is the ultimate priority. Koirala was against war, and by looking at the Vedanta philosophy and the issue of war from a war widow's point of view, he once again shakes the conscience of the Nepali readers who generally tend to accept the philosophy of Vedanta especially its idea of karma (fate). Characteristically, Koirala presents one more instance in which he analyses the mind of a woman, as he did in most of his short stories and novels.

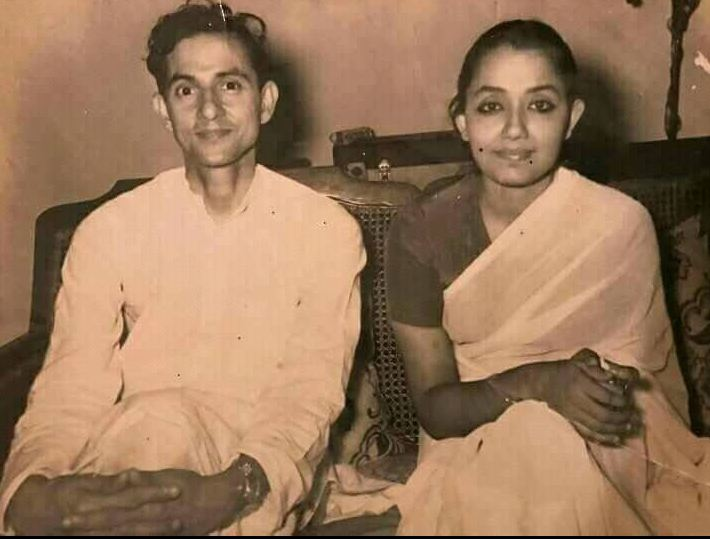
B. P. Koirala and Sushila Koirala

== Personal life ==
B. P. Koirala was married to Sushila Koirala, a Nepalese classical dancer, theater director, and philanthropist.

== Legacy ==
The following institutions have been set up in his memory:

1. In 1992, the B. P. Koirala Nepal Health Foundation was inaugurated by the prime ministers of India and Nepal with the objective of supplementing the normal cooperation and interaction at the Government-to-Government level by providing statesmen, media persons, etc. to constantly nurture and further enhance the understanding and friendship between two countries. The trust is a symbol of Nepali renaissance.
2. In 1992, the Government of Nepal has established the B. P. Koirala Memorial Planetarium, Observatory and Science Museum Development Board in 1992 in order to establish Planetaria, Observatories and Science Museums in Nepal & conduct research activities in the area of Astronomy, Astrophysics and Cosmology.
3. B. P. Koirala Memorial Trust (B. P. Trust) was established in 2000 in memory of the late B. P. Koirala. It is the only legal institution approved by the government of Nepal to collect royalties, claim copyrights and allow legal permission regarding B. P. Koirala. B. P. Trust receives financial support from the government. The establishment of this Trust in B. P. Koirala's memory can be considered as a remarkable achievement.

Also, various programs are organized in Nepal as well as outside Nepal to remember his selfless contributions to Nepal.

== Honors ==
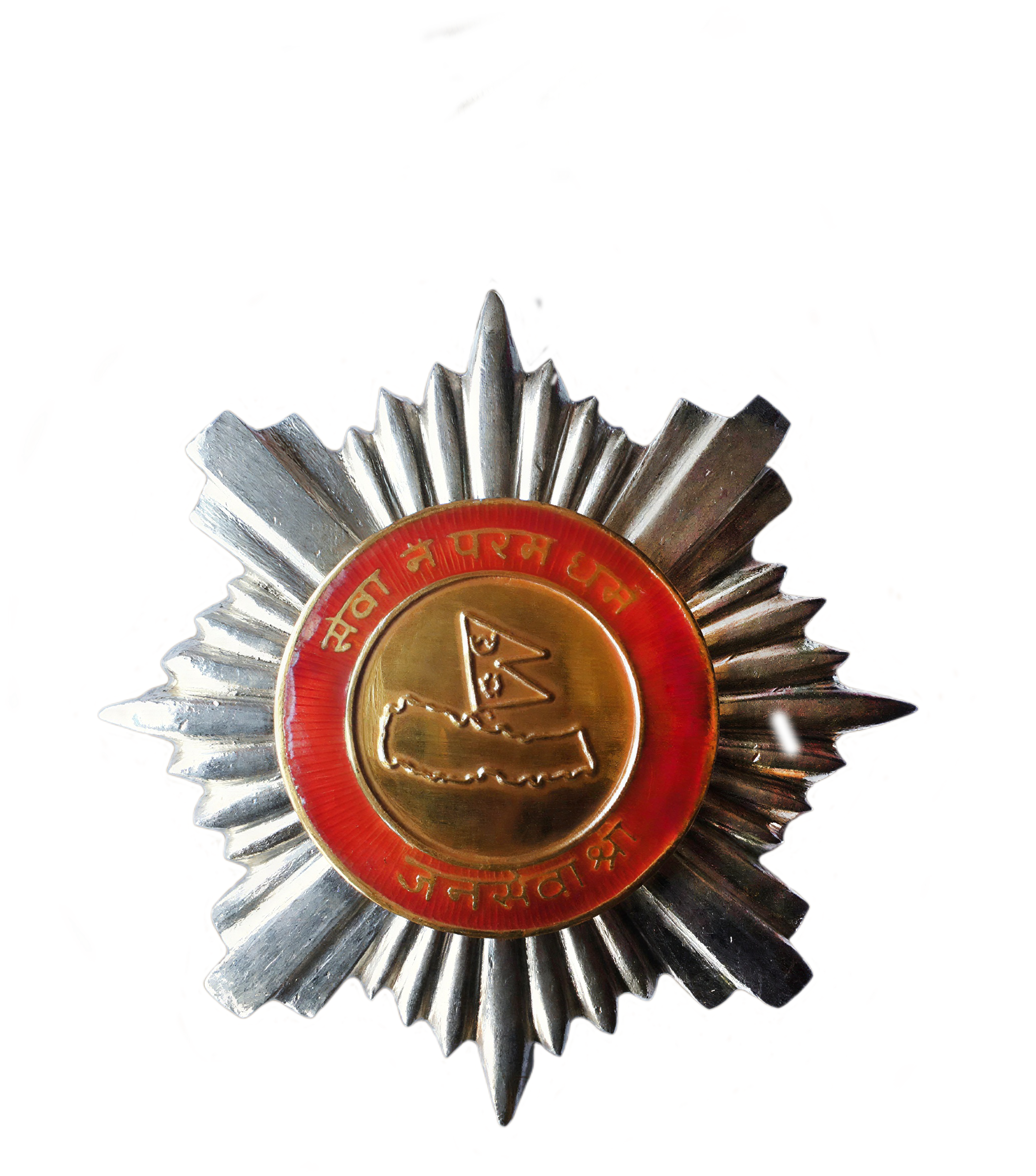
- Nepal Ratna Man Padavi (2018) – Posthumously awarded to Bishweshwar Parsad Koirala by the then President of Nepal, Bidya Devi Bhandari.
- Bangladesh Liberation War Honour (2012) – Posthumously awarded to Bishweshwar Prasad Koirala.

== See also ==
- Nepali literature
- Biratnagar Jute Mill Strike
- Koirala family

== Bibliography ==
- Doshi Chasma

Political offices
Preceded by Subarna Shamsher Rana	Prime Minister of Nepal; 1959–1960	Succeeded by Tulsi Giri
Preceded by Purendra Bikram Shah	Minister of Defence; 1959–1960	Succeeded by Tulsi Giri
Preceded by Purendra Bikram Shah	Minister of Foreign Affairs; 1959	Succeeded by Tulsi Giri
Preceded by Office established	Minister of Home Affairs; 1951	Succeeded by Surya Prasad Upadhyaya
Party political offices
Preceded by Subarna Shamsher Rana	President of the Nepali Congress; 1957–1982	Succeeded by Krishna Prasad Bhattarai
Preceded by Matrika Prasad Koirala	President of the Nepali Congress; 1952–1956	Succeeded by Subarna Shamsher Rana
