= Girija Prasad Koirala =

Nepalese politician (1924–2010)

- गिरिजाप्रसाद कोइराला
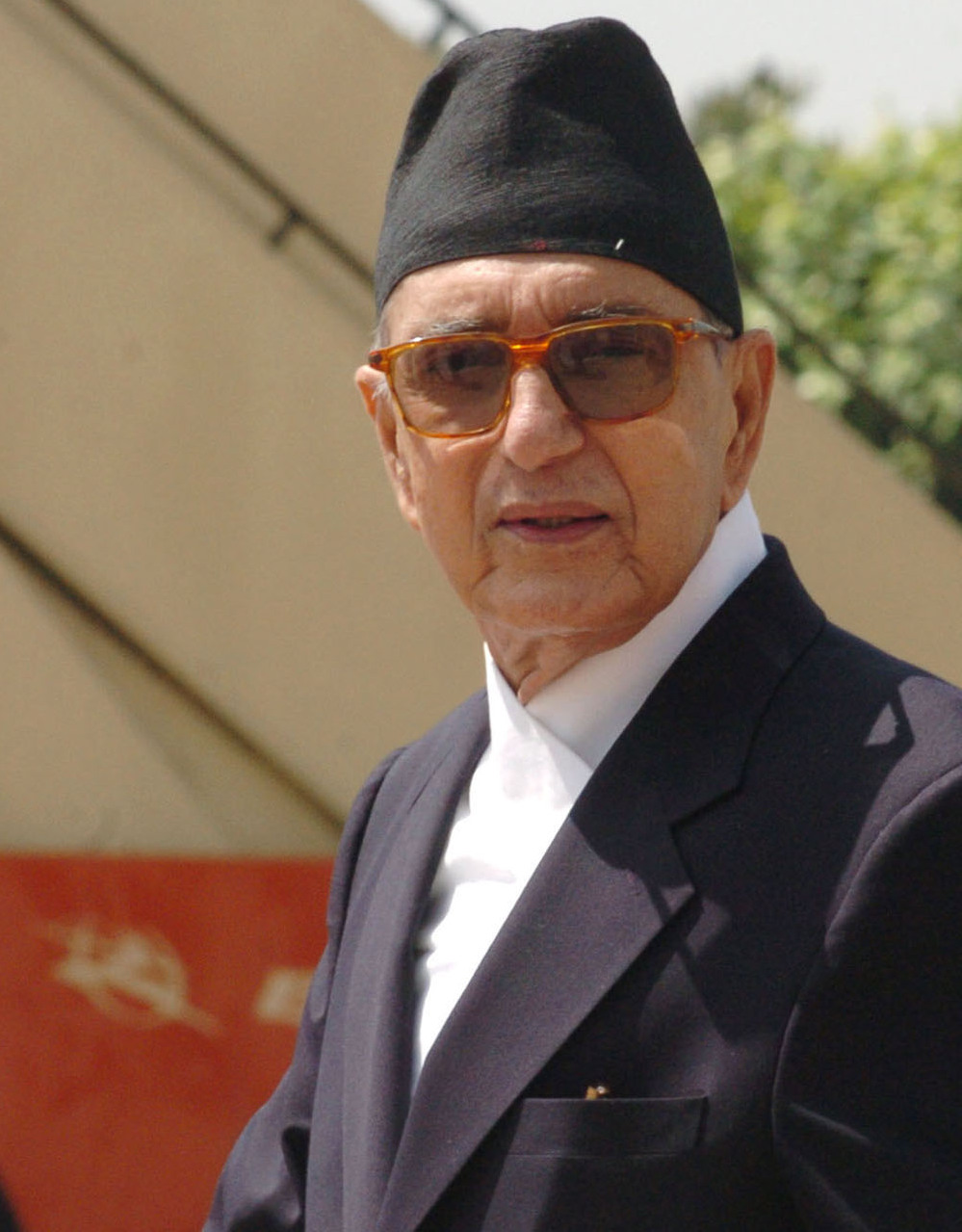
- Koirala in 2007

Acting Head of State of Nepal
- In office 15 January 2007 – 23 July 2008
- Preceded by: Gyanendra (as King)
- Succeeded by: Ram Baran Yadav (as President)

Prime Minister of Nepal
- In office 25 April 2006 – 18 August 2008
- Monarch: Gyanendra
- President: Ram Baran Yadav
- Deputy: K. P. Sharma Oli; Amik Sherchan
- Preceded by: Sher Bahadur Deuba (Note: King Gyanendra ruled the country directly from 1 February 2005)
- Succeeded by: Pushpa Kamal Dahal
- In office 22 March 2000 – 26 July 2001
- Monarchs: Birendra; Dipendra; Gyanendra
- Deputy: Ram Chandra Paudel
- Preceded by: Krishna Prasad Bhattarai
- Succeeded by: Sher Bahadur Deuba
- In office 15 April 1998 – 31 May 1999
- Monarch: Birendra
- Deputy: Sailaja Acharya
- Preceded by: Surya Bahadur Thapa
- Succeeded by: Krishna Prasad Bhattarai
- In office 26 May 1991 – 30 November 1994
- Monarch: Birendra
- Preceded by: Krishna Prasad Bhattarai
- Succeeded by: Man Mohan Adhikari

Leader of the Opposition
- In office 18 August 2008 – 25 May 2009
- Prime Minister: Pushpa Kamal Dahal
- Preceded by: Madhav Kumar Nepal (2002)
- Succeeded by: Pushpa Kamal Dahal
- In office 12 March 1997 – 7 October 1997
- Prime Minister: Lokendra Bahadur Chand
- Preceded by: Man Mohan Adhikari
- Succeeded by: Man Mohan Adhikari

President of the Nepali Congress
- In office 11 May 1996 – 20 March 2010
- Preceded by: Krishna Prasad Bhattarai
- Succeeded by: Sushil Koirala

Member of the Constituent Assembly
- In office 28 May 2008 – 20 March 2010
- Constituency: Party list (Nepali Congress)

Member of the House of Representatives
- In office 28 April 2006 – 16 January 2008
- Preceded by: Himself (2002)
- Succeeded by: Upendra Yadav (as Member of the Constituent Assembly)
- Constituency: Sunsari 5
- In office 23 June 1999 – 22 May 2002
- Preceded by: Jagadish Prasad Kusiyat
- Succeeded by: Himself (2006)
- Constituency: Sunsari 5
- In office 20 June 1991 – 15 January 1999
- Preceded by: Constituency created
- Succeeded by: Amod Prasad Upadhyay
- Constituency: Morang 1

Personal details
- Born: 4 July 1924 Saharsa, Bihar and Orissa Province, British India (present-day Bihar, India)
- Died: 20 March 2010 (aged 85) Kathmandu, Nepal
- Party: Nepali Congress
- Spouse: Sushma Koirala (m. 1952; died 1967)
- Children: Sujata Koirala
- Parent: Krishna Prasad Koirala (father)
- Relatives: See Koirala family
- Education: Kirori Mal College (University of Delhi)
- Awards: Nepal Ratna (2015)

Nepal Ratna Girija Prasad Koirala (Nepali: गिरिजाप्रसाद कोइराला; 4 July 1924 – 20 March 2010), affectionately known as Girija Babu, was a Nepalese politician. He headed the Nepali Congress and served as the Prime Minister of Nepal on four occasions: from 1991 to 1994, 1998 to 1999, 2000 to 2001, and 2006 to 2008. He was the Acting Head of State of Nepal between January 2007 and July 2008 as the country transitioned from a monarchy to a republic.

Koirala, who was active in politics for over sixty years, was a pioneer of the Nepalese labour movement, having started the first political workers' movement on Nepalese soil, known as the Biratnagar jute mill strike in his hometown, Biratnagar. In 1991 he became the first democratically elected prime minister in Nepal since 1959, when his brother B. P. Koirala and the Nepali Congress party were swept into power in the country's first democratic election. He was the most prominent and consequential political leader in Nepal from 1990 to 2008.

== Personal life ==
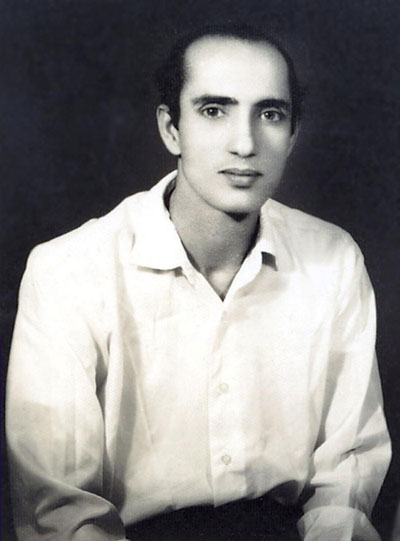
Girija Prasad Koirala in his youth

Koirala was born on 4 July 1924 in Saharsa, in the Bihar and Orissa Province of British India into a Bahun family. His father, Krishna Prasad Koirala, was a Nepali living in exile. In 1952 Koirala married Sushma Koirala, headmistress at the local school for women in Biratnagar. Their daughter Sujata Koirala was born in 1953. Sushma died in a kerosene-stove explosion in 1967. He along with his daughter Sujata were followers of the Indian spiritual leader Sathya Sai Baba.

Girija Prasad Koirala belonged to one of Nepal's most prominent political families. Two of his brothers were prime ministers: Matrika Prasad Koirala from 1951 to 1952 and 1953 to 1955, and Bishweshwar Prasad Koirala from 1959 until King Mahendra took over the government in December 1960. Bishweshwar Prasad and Girija Prasad were arrested and sent to prison. With other leaders of the Nepali Congress Party (NCP), Girija Prasad went into exile after his release in 1967 and did not return to Nepal until 1979.

== Political career ==
Koirala became involved in politics in 1947, leading the Biratnagar jute mill strike. In 1948 Koirala founded the Nepal Mazdoor Congress, later known as the Nepal Trade Union Congress-Independent. Later, in 1952, he became the President of the Morang District Nepali Congress and held that office until he was arrested and imprisoned by King Mahendra following the 1960 royal coup. Upon his release in 1967, Koirala, along with other leaders and workers of the party, was exiled to India until his return to Nepal in 1979. Koirala was General Secretary of the Nepali Congress Party from 1975 to 1991. Koirala was actively involved in the 1990 Jana Andolan which led to the abrogation of Panchayat rule and the introduction of multiparty politics into the country.

=== First term ===
In Nepal's first multiparty democratic election in 1991, Koirala was elected as a member of parliament from the Morang-1 and Sunsari-5 constituencies. The Nepali Congress won 110 of the 205 seats in the Pratinidhi Sabha (House of Representatives), the lower house of parliament. He was subsequently elected as the leader of the Nepali Congress parliamentary party and was appointed as prime minister by King Birendra.

During his first term, the House of Representatives enacted legislation to liberalize education, media and health sectors in the country. The government also founded the Purbanchal University and the B.P. Koirala Institute of Health Sciences(BPKIHS) in the Eastern Development Region and granted licenses to the private sector to run medical and engineering colleges in various parts of the country. The government also undertook the construction of the B.P. Koirala Memorial Cancer Hospital in Bharatpur, Nepal with assistance from the government of China.

In November 1994, he called for a dissolution of parliament and general elections after a procedural defeat on the floor of the House when 36 members of parliament (MPs) of his party went against a government-sponsored vote of confidence. This led to the Communist Party of Nepal (Unified Marxist–Leninist)-led coalition coming to power in the elections that followed.

=== Second and third term ===
Koirala took over as prime minister from Surya Bahadur Thapa following the collapse of the coalition government led by Thapa. Koirala first headed a Nepali Congress minority government until 25 December 1998, after which he headed a three-party coalition government with the Communist Party of Nepal (UML) and the Nepal Sadbhawana Party.

=== Fourth term ===
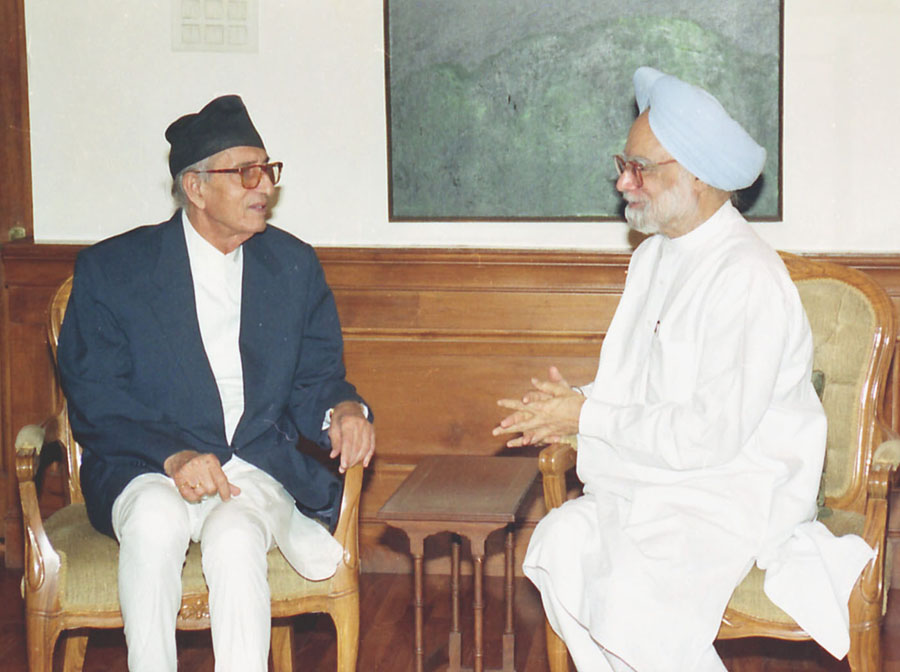
Koirala calls on the Indian Prime Minister Dr. Manmohan Singh in New Delhi on 29 June 2004

Koirala became prime minister in 2000 for his third term following the resignation of Krishna Prasad Bhattarai, under whose leadership the Nepali Congress Party had won the parliamentary election. The party had won claiming that Krishna Prasad Bhattarai would be the Prime Minister, but Koirala led a group of dissident MPs and forced Bhattarai to resign or face a no-confidence motion. At that time Nepal was fighting a civil war against the Communist Party of Nepal (Maoist). Koirala resigned in July 2001, one month after the Nepalese royal massacre after which the military was mobilized in the civil war for the first time, something Koirala had unsuccessfully attempted to do while in office. He was replaced by former prime minister Sher Bahadur Deuba, who was elected by a majority of members of the Nepal.

=== Fifth term ===
After the Loktantra Andolan and the reinstatement of the Nepal House of Representatives, Pratinidhi Sabha, on 24 April 2006, Koirala was selected to become prime minister by the leaders of the Seven Party Alliance. The reinstated House of Representatives passed laws to strip the King of his powers and bring the Army under civilian control. Following the promulgation of the interim constitution, Koirala, as the Prime Minister, became the interim head of state of Nepal.

=== Interim term ===
On 1 April 2007, Koirala was re-elected as prime minister to head a new government composed of the SPA and the CPN (Maoist). Following the April 2008 Constituent Assembly election, the Constituent Assembly voted to declare Nepal a republic on 28 May 2008. Koirala, speaking to the Constituent Assembly shortly before the vote, said that "we have a big responsibility now"; he said that Nepal was entering a "new era" and that "the nation's dream has come true".

In the discussions on power-sharing that followed the declaration of a republic, the Nepali Congress proposed that Koirala become the first President of Nepal; however, the CPN (Maoist), which had emerged as the strongest party in the Constituent Assembly election, opposed this.

At a meeting of the Constituent Assembly on 26 June 2008, Koirala announced his resignation, although it would not be finalized until after the election of a president, to whom the resignation had to be submitted.

Koirala was present for the swearing in of Ram Baran Yadav, the first president of Nepal, on 23 July 2008. He submitted his resignation to Yadav later on the same day. CPN (M) Chairman Prachanda was elected by the Constituent Assembly to succeed Koirala on 15 August 2008; Koirala congratulated Prachanda on this occasion.

=== Later activity ===
Towards the end of his life, Koirala was leading a democratic front composed of parties that supported and promoted liberal democratic principles and aspired to establishment of a long-term democratic form of governance in Nepal.

Koirala wrote Simple Convictions: My Struggle for Peace and Democracy.

== Death ==
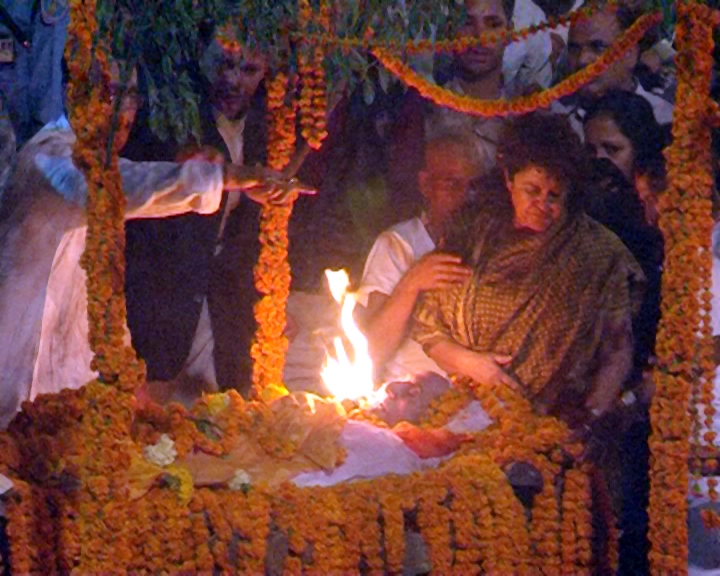
Sujata Koirala at funeral of Girija Prasad Koirala.

Koirala died at his daughter's home on 20 March 2010 at the age of 85, having suffered from asthma and pulmonary disease. His funeral was held at Pashupatinath Temple in Kathmandu on 21 March. Upon receiving news of his death, numerous politicians released statements of condolence. The Hindu described him as a "national guardian". Indian Prime Minister Manmohan Singh released a statement expressing his condolences, saying "Koirala was a mass leader and a statesman, whose knowledge and wisdom guided the polity of Nepal in the right direction at critical junctures in the country's history," while Ban Ki-moon, Secretary-General of the United Nations said "Koirala fought fearlessly and at considerable personal sacrifice for justice and democratic rights in his country" and senior Maoist politician Baburam Bhattarai said "Koirala will be very much missed, especially now that the country is nearing the end of the peace process that he facilitated".

== Awards ==
In 2015, he was posthumously awarded with Nepal Ratna Man Padavi, the highest honour to a Nepali citizen by the Government of Nepal.

- Bangladesh :
  - Bangladesh Liberation War Honour

== See also ==
- Biratnagar jute mill strike
- Bishweshwar Prasad Koirala
- List of prime ministers of Nepal

== Notes ==
Political offices
Preceded by Krishna Prasad Bhattarai	Prime Minister of Nepal; 1991–1994	Succeeded by Man Mohan Adhikari
Preceded by Surya Bahadur Thapa	Prime Minister of Nepal; 1998–1999	Succeeded by Krishna Prasad Bhattarai
Preceded by Krishna Prasad Bhattarai	Prime Minister of Nepal; 2000–2001	Succeeded by Sher Bahadur Deuba
Preceded by Sher Bahadur Deuba	Prime Minister of Nepal; 2006–2008	Succeeded by Pushpa Kamal Dahal
Preceded by Gyanendra as King of Nepal	President of Nepal; Acting; 2007–2008	Succeeded by Ram Baran Yadav
Party political offices
Preceded by Krishna Prasad Bhattarai	President of Nepali Congress; 1996–2010	Succeeded by Sushil Koirala
