= Dhanpalthan Rural Municipality =

Dhanpalthan Gaupalika
- Gaupalika
- Dhanpalthan Gaupalika in the map Dhanpalthan Gaupalika (Nepal)
- Coordinates: 26.4695°N 87.4146°E
- country: Nepal
- Province: Province No. 1
- District: Morang District
- established: 27 Falgun 2073

Government
  - Chairperson: Mr. Jivach Prasad Gachchhadar (NC)
  - Vice-chairperson: Mrs. Nasima Banu (NC)

Area
  - Total: 70.26 km^{2} (27.13 sq mi)

Population (2017)
  - Total: 39,394
  - Density: 560.7/km^{2} (1,452/sq mi)
- Time zone: UTC+5:45 (Nepal Standard Time)
- Area code: +977-021
- Office: Present Sorabhag VDC Office
- Website: www.dhanapalthanmun.gov.np

Dhanpalthan (Nepali: धनपालथान गाउँपालिका) is a Gaupalika (rural municipality) located at Morang district. Dadarbairiya, Sorabhag, Amaibariyati, Kadamaha and Nocha VDCs were incorporated into Dhanpalthan Gaupalika. This rural municipality has an area of 70.26 km^{2}. The population as of 2017 is 39,394. The current VDC Office of Sorabhag is the office of this Gaupalika.
