= Krishna Kumar Karki =

Nepalese politician

Honourable Krishna Kumar Karki
- कृष्णकुमार कार्की

Member of Parliament, Pratinidhi Sabha
- Incumbent
- Assumed office 26 March 2026
- Preceded by: Rishikesh Pokharel
- Constituency: Morang 2

Personal details
- Born: 6 December 1985 (age 40) Ratuwamai, Morang
- Citizenship: Nepalese
- Party: Rastriya Swatantra Party (2026 – present)
- Parent: Chandra Bahadur Karki (father)
- Profession: Politician

Krishna Kumar Karki (Nepali: कृष्णकुमार कार्की) is a Nepalese politician of Rastriya Swatantra Party, currently serving as a member of parliament. He was elected to the Pratinidhi Sabha, the lower house of the Federal Parliament of Nepal from the Morang 2 parliamentary constituency in the 2026 Nepalese General Election. He secured 40,924 votes and defeated Dilip Kumar Agrawal of the CPN (UML).

== Personal life ==
Karki was born in Ratuwamai, Morang, on December 6, 1985. He was born to Chandra Bahadur Karki. After spending 12 years in Japan, he returned to Nepal and opened a hotel in Kathmandu.

== Politics ==
He began his political journey by joining the Rastriya Swatantra Party in 2026. He contested the 2026 Nepalese general election from the Morang 2 constituency and won by a margin of 25,300 votes. He defeated former Defence minister, Minendra Rijal of the Nepali Congress and Dilip Kumar Agrawal, mayor of Rangeli Municipality of the CPN (UML).

== Controversies ==
On January 21, 2026, he filed his candidacy for member of parliament from Rastriya Swatantra Party at Election Office, Morang. An allegations surfaced online after the nomination regarding his involvement in the 2025 Nepalese Gen Z protests, igniting controversy across social media platforms and online news portals.

== Electoral performance ==
| Election | Year | Constituency | Contested for | Political party | Result | Votes | % of votes | Ref. |
|---|---|---|---|---|---|---|---|---|
| Nepal general election | 2026 | Morang 2 | Pratinidhi Sabha member | Rastriya Swatantra Party | Won | 40,924 | 54.72% | |
