= Budhiganga Rural Municipality =

Budhiganga बुढीगंगा गाउँपालिका
- Gaupalika
- Location of Budhiganga in Koshi Province Budhiganga (Nepal)
- Coordinates: 26.57°N 87.31°E
- country: Nepal
- Province: Koshi Province
- District: Morang District
- Wards: 7
- established: 10 March 2017
- Seat: Hathimudha

Government
  - Type: Rural Council
  - Chairperson: Mr. Jit Narayan Thapa Magar (NC)
  - Vice-chairperson: Mrs. Amrita Kumari Gacchadar (NC)

Area
  - Total: 56.41 km^{2} (21.78 sq mi)

Population (2021)
  - Total: 51,497
  - Density: 912.9/km^{2} (2,364/sq mi)
- Time zone: UTC+5:45 (Nepal Standard Time)
- Area code: +977-021
- Website: Official website

Budhiganga (Nepali: बुढीगंगा गाउँपालिका) is a rural municipality (gaupalika) in Morang District, Koshi Province, Nepal. Located in the southwestern part of the district, it borders Biratnagar to the south and forms part of the Sunsari Morang Industrial Corridor, which extends along the Koshi Highway. According to the 2021 Nepal census, Budhiganga had a population of 51,497 inhabitants and covers an area of 56.41 square kilometres (21.78 mi^{2}).

== History ==
The Budhiganga Rural Municipality was formed as a new local level body through the merging of the four former Village development committees (VDC) Tankisinuwari, Hathimudha, Sisabanibadahara, and Dangraha. This merge was due to the requirement of the Constitution of Nepal to replace all old VDCs with a new structure of rural municipalities (gaupalika) and municipalities (nagarpalika).

== Etymology ==
The rural municipality Budhiganga's name is derived from the Budhi Khola stream, which flows along the western border.

== Geography and location ==
Budhiganga is located in the southwestern part of the Morang District, sharing a boundary to the south with Biratnagar, the administrative centre of the district. Budhiganga is also bordered by Gramthan Rural Municipality to the east, Sunsari District to the west, and Sundar Haraicha Municipality to the north. The Koshi Highway passes through Budhiganga, which is located at 87 metres above sea level and consists mainly of flat land.

== Economy ==
Budhiganga is part of the Sunsari Morang Industrial Corridor, located primarily along the Koshi Highway. Despite the long industrial history of Biratnagar, rapid urbanization pushed existing industries and new investments out of Biratnagar and towards nearby areas, including Budhiganga. This process includes Chandra Shiva Rice and Oil Mill, one of Biratnagar's oldest industries, moving from Thulo Mill Chowk to Hattimuda in Budhiganga.

Another notable industry found in Budhiganga is Alexa Lifesciences, the first saline manufacturing industry in Koshi Province.

== Administration ==
Budhiganga is divided into seven wards: Karaiya, Tankisinwari, Bansbari, Nemuwa, Hattimuda, Koyalpur, and Dangraha. The administrative headquarters of the rural municipality is located in Hathimudha.

== Demographics ==
According to the 2021 Nepal census, published by the Central Bureau of Statistics, Budhiganga Rural Municipality had a population of 51,497 inhabitants, an increase from 41,971 recorded in the 2011 Nepal census and 34,193 recorded in the 2001 Nepal census. This represents an average annual population growth rate of 2.0% between 2011 and 2021. The municipality covers an area of 56.41 square kilometres (21.78 mi^{2}), giving it a population density of 912.9 inhabitants per square kilometre.

The 2021 census recorded 25,307 males (49.1%) and 26,190 females (50.9%). In terms of age distribution, 12,635 residents (24.5%) were aged 0–14, 35,798 (69.5%) were aged 15–64, and 3,064 (6.0%) were aged 65 or older.

Regarding citizenship, 51,227 residents (99.5%) held Nepali citizenship, while 265 held Indian citizenship and five held other citizenships. In terms of place of birth, 32,491 residents (63.1%) were born within Budhiganga, 4,759 (9.2%) in another municipality in the Morang District, 13,326 (25.9%) in another district, and 916 (1.8%) in another country.

Among residents aged five and above, 36,194 (75.9%) were recorded as literate, while 79 were able only to read and 11,392 (23.9%) were recorded as unable to read or write.
