= Morang 2 =

Parliamentary constituency in Nepal

- Parliamentary constituency
- Morang 2 in Koshi Province
- Province: Koshi Province
- District: Morang District

Current constituency
- Created: 1991
- Party: Rastriya Swatantra Party
- Member of Parliament: Krishna Kumar Karki
- Member of the Provincial Assembly: Shiva Narayan Ganagain, NC
- Member of the Provincial Assembly: Lila Ballav Adhikari, CPN (UML)

Morang 2 is one of six parliamentary constituencies of Morang District in Nepal. This constituency came into existence on the Constituency Delimitation Commission (CDC) report submitted on 31 August 2017.

== Incorporated areas ==
Morang 2 incorporates Ratuwamai Municipality, Sunawarshi Municipality, wards 5 and 6 of Pathari Shanishchare Municipality, wards 1–3 of Kanepokhari Rural Municipality and wards 1–3, 8 and 9 of Rangeli Municipality.

== Assembly segments ==
It encompasses the following Province No. 1 Provincial Assembly segment

- Morang 2(A)
- Morang 2(B)

== Members of Parliament ==
=== Parliament/Constituent Assembly ===
Election	Member	Party
1991	Bharat Mohan Adhikari	CPN (Unified Marxist–Leninist)
1994	Bharat Mohan Adhikari	CPN (Unified Marxist–Leninist)
1999	Bharat Mohan Adhikari	
2008	Lal Bahadur Susling Magar	CPN (Maoist)
January 2009	Lal Bahadur Susling Magar	UCPN (Maoist)
2013	Chandi Prasad Rai	CPN (Unified Marxist–Leninist)
2017	Minendra Prasad Rijal	Nepali Congress
2022	Rishikesh Pokharel	CPN (Unified Marxist–Leninist)
2026	Krishna Kumar Karki	Rastriya Swatantra Party

=== Provincial Assembly ===
==== 2(A) ====
Election	Member	Party
2017	Shiva Narayan Gangai	Nepali Congress

==== 2(B) ====
Election	Member	Party
2017	Lila Ballabh Adhikari	CPN (Unified Marxist-Leninist)
May 2018	Lila Ballabh Adhikari	Nepal Communist Party
March 2021	Lila Ballabh Adhikari	CPN (Unified Marxist–Leninist)

== Election results ==
=== Election in the 2020s ===
==== 2026 general election ====
Candidate	Party	Votes	%
Krishna Kumar Karki	RSP	40,924	54.72
Dilip Kumar Bagediya	CPN (UML)	15,624	20.89
Minendra Prasad Rijal	Congress	12,764	17.07
Abuho Rairaha	SSP	1,822	2.44
Chandra Bir Rai	NCP	1,366	1.83
Others		2,286	3.06
Total		74,786	100.00
Registered voters/turnout			–
Majority		25,300	
RSP gain			

==== 2022 general election ====
Candidate	Party	Votes	%
Rishikesh Pokharel	CPN (UML)	33,148	43.81
Sujata Koirala	Nepali Congress	31,940	42.21
Thagendra Prasad Neupane	Rastriya Swatantra Party	4,987	6.59
Gopal Dahal	Rastriya Prajatantra Party	2,745	3.63
Binod Mani Bhattarai	Hamro Nepali Party	1,457	1.93
Others		1,389	1.84
Total		75,666	100.00
Majority		1,208	
CPN (UML) gain			

=== Election in the 2010s ===
==== 2017 legislative elections ====
Party	Candidate	Votes
Nepali Congress	Minendra Prasad Rijal	35,819
CPN (Unified Marxist–Leninist)	Rishikesh Pokharel	34,014
Federal Socialist Forum, Nepal	Yuvraj Karki	2,595
Rastriya Janata Party Nepal	Mahendra Lal Das Kevrat	2,082
Others		1,279
Invalid votes		4,460
Result	Congress gain	
Source: Election Commission

==== 2017 Nepalese provincial elections ====
===== 2(A) =====
Party	Candidate	Votes
Nepali Congress	Shiva Narayan Gangai	16,418
CPN (Maoist Centre)	Ganesh Prasad Upreti	15,107
Rastriya Janta Party Nepal	Amrendra Kumar Sah	2,868
Federal Socialist Forum, Nepal	Udaya Kumar Yadav	2,123
Others		944
Invalid votes		2,199
Result	Congress gain	
Source: Election Commission

===== 2(B) =====
Party	Candidate	Votes
CPN (Unified Marxist–Leninist)	Lila Ballabh Adhikari	18,386
Nepali Congress	Ghanindra Bahadur Kunwar	17,127
Federal Socialist Forum, Nepal	Aashi Nath Rajbanshi	1,700
Others		1,652
Invalid votes		1,630
Result	CPN (UML) gain	
Source: Election Commission

==== 2013 Constituent Assembly election ====
Party	Candidate	Votes
CPN (Unified Marxist–Leninist)	Chandi Prasad Rai	14,516
Nepali Congress	Shekhar Chandra Thapa	11,144
UCPN (Maoist)	Kumar Prasad Paudel	5,487
Federal Socialist Party, Nepal	Bhuraj Rai	1,595
Others		4,127
Result	CPN (UML) gain	
Source: NepalNews

=== Election in the 2000s ===
==== 2008 Constituent Assembly election ====
Party	Candidate	Votes
CPN (Maoist)	Lal Bahadur Susling Magar	16,567
CPN (Unified Marxist–Leninist)	Bharat Mohan Adhikari	12,537
Nepali Congress	Basanta Bhattarai	10,093
CPN (Marxist–Leninist)	Deuman Sambahamphe	2,180
Madheshi Janaadhikar Forum, Nepal	Shukra Raj Sanyok	1,261
Others		1,391
Invalid votes		2,714
Result	Maoist gain	
Source: Election Commission

=== Election in the 1990s ===
==== 1999 legislative elections ====
Party	Candidate	Votes
CPN (Unified Marxist–Leninist)	Bharat Mohan Adhikari	22,428
Nepali Congress	Basanta Bhattarai	15,364
Rastriya Janamukti Party	Man Bahadur Rai	3,419
CPN (Marxist–Leninist)	Lav Pradhan	1,142
Rastriya Prajatantra Party	Bhagwati Karki	1,104
Others		1,373
Invalid Votes		940
Result	CPN (UML) hold	
Source: Election Commission

==== 1994 legislative elections ====
Party	Candidate	Votes
CPN (Unified Marxist–Leninist)	Bharat Mohan Adhikari	16,758
Nepali Congress	Basanta Bhattarai	9,174
Rastriya Prajatantra Party	Dhruba Narayan Shrestha	4,932
Rastriya Janamukti Party	Kamal Charahanga	4,169
Others		447
Result	CPN (UML) hold	
Source: Election Commission

==== 1991 legislative elections ====
Party	Candidate	Votes
CPN (Unified Marxist–Leninist)	Bharat Mohan Adhikari	26,950
Nepali Congress	Jagat Man Angdambe	12,993
Result	CPN (UML) gain	

== See also ==
- List of parliamentary constituencies of Nepal
