= Toribari =

Toribari तोरीबारी
- Village
- Location in Nepal
- Coordinates: 26.73°N 87.63°E
- Country: Nepal
- Zone: Koshi Zone
- District: Morang District
- Vdc: Madhumalla
- Time zone: UTC+5:43 (Nepal Time)
- Postal code: 56605
- Area code: 021

Madhumalla-3, Toribari is a village located in madhumalla morang of Koshi Zone. It is located 10 km north of Urlabari with hills and rivers. The estimated elevation above sea level is 205 meters.

== Education ==
There is one government and three private schools. Among them three are secondary and one is a primary school.

== Economy ==
Almost all the people are engaged in agriculture. The people earn by selling vegetables and fruits.
