= Takuwa =

Village in Morang district, Nepal

Takuwa (Nepali: टकुवा) is a town and business center under Sunbarshi Municipality in Morang District in the Kosi Zone of south-eastern Nepal. The village was submerged under Sunbarshi Municipality in 2015 following the government decision.

At the time of the 1991 Nepal census it had a population of 6001 people living in 1262 individual households.

Takuwa is famous for its variable ethnic group living in a hormonal relationship.

Danku Than of Takuwa currently on Sunbarshi 5 is the place containing various historical background.

Mandal, Das, Rajbanshi and Yadav are the main groups living in this former VDC.

One of the oldest school of morang district Sree Janta Adharvut vidyalaya is located here.
