= GVM =

GVM may refer to:

- Godawari Vidhya Mandir, a school in Itahari, Nepal
- Goa Vidyaprasarak Mandal, an educational institution in India
- Gautham Vasudev Menon, an Indian film director, screenwriter and producer who works in Tamil, Telugu and Hindi cinema
- Gross vehicle mass, the maximum rated mass of a vehicle including its tare mass and the mass of its load, including its cargo, driver and passengers
- Generalized Verma module, an object in mathematics
- may refer to several Godzilla films, including Godzilla vs. Megalon, Godzilla vs. Mechagodzilla, Godzilla vs. Mothra, or Godzilla vs. Megaguirus
