= Pathao =

Bangladeshi vehicle for hire company

Pathao Ltd
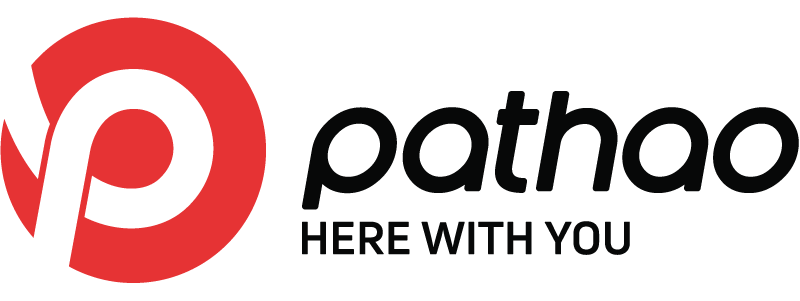
- Logo since 25 October 2023 Logo since 25 October 2023
- Native name: পাঠাও
- Type: Digital Platform
- Industry: Transportation; food delivery; delivery (commerce)
- Founded: March 2015; 11 years ago in Dhaka, Bangladesh
- Founders: Hussain Elius; Shifat Adnan; Fahim Saleh
- Headquarters: Gulshan 2, Dhaka, Bangladesh
- Area served: Bangladesh, Nepal
- Key people: Fahim Ahmed (CEO); Shifat Adnan (CTO)
- Services: On-Demand Transportation; Food Delivery; Delivery Logistics
- Revenue: ▲US$14 million
- Number of employees: 1200 (2019)
- Divisions: Pathao Bike; Pathao Car; Pathao Food; Pathao Parcel; Pathao Courier (B2B); Pathao Shop; Pathao Tong; Pathao Pharma; Pathao Health; Pathao Top Up; Pathao Pay; Pathao Pay Later; Pathao Nepal Private Limited
- Website: pathao.com

Pathao (Bengali: পাঠাও, Nepali: पठाओ) is a Bangladeshi on-demand digital platform company headquartered in Dhaka, Bangladesh. The company operates in four cities in Bangladesh: Dhaka, Chittagong, Khulna, Sylhet, and in three cities in Nepal: Kathmandu, Pokhara and Chitwan. Pathao has ride-sharing services, food delivery, courier and E-commerce services. Pathao is the first major ride-sharing company in Bangladesh to get enlistment certificate from the authorities.

Pathao is a Bengali word meaning "send". The company was founded by Fahim Saleh, Hussain Elius, and Shifat Adnan.

On 1 November 2021, Pathao appointed its chief financial officer, Fahim Ahmed, as Managing Director & Chief Executive Officer of the ride-sharing platform.

== History ==
Pathao started as a delivery service back in 2015 with its fleet of motorcycles and bicycles. They acted as a delivery service for several E-Commerce Companies of Bangladesh. Later in 2016, Pathao started bike-sharing services in mid-2016 and successfully signed up more than 100,000 drivers and around 1 million users in March 2018 across the country. In an interview with TechCrunch, Pathao Co-founder, Hussain M Elius confirmed that Pathao currently has over 50,000 bikes registered on its platform and the company is valued at over $100 million as of April 2018. In September 2018, Pathao launched its services in Nepal. Pathao is the first Bangladeshi company to offer On-demand Transport Sharing services abroad. On 3 December 2019, Pathao became the first major ride-sharing service providing company in Bangladesh to get enlistment certificate from the authorities in Bangladesh.

== Operations ==
Pathao follows a SuperApp model, providing all of its services through one app.

== Services ==
Pathao currently provides on-demand ride-sharing, on-demand parcel, courier, food delivery, Heli Services ( CURRENTLY IN NEPAL ) services in major cities like Dhaka, Chittagong and Sylhet and in Kathmandu, Lalitpur, Chitwan and many more cities of Nepal and Bangladesh. Its food delivery services are currently available in Dhaka, Chittagong, Sylhet and Nepal.

=== Ride-sharing ===
Pathao provides on-demand ride-sharing services through motorcycles, cars and tuktuks. Both the driver and the passenger is required to have an Android or iOS-based, internet and GPS-enabled, smartphone to avail Pathao's service. Pathao uses a location based system to match the passenger with a driver nearby heading towards the destination. It has more than 100,000 registered vehicles across the country. Ride-sharing service is available in the following cities and suburbs:

- Kathmandu, Nepal
- Chitwan, Nepal
- Pokhara, Nepal
- Biratnagar, Nepal
- Butwal, Nepal
- Bhairahawa, Nepal
- Nepalgunj, Nepal
- Birgunj, Nepal
- Janakpur, Nepal
- Dhangadhi, Nepal
- Tikapur, Nepal
- Hetauda, Nepal
- Dhangadi, Nepal
- Bhadrapur, Nepal
- Birtamod, Nepal
- Damak, Nepal
- Dharan, Nepal
- Inaruwa, Nepal
- Itahari, Nepal
- Urlabari, Nepal
- Biratchowk, Nepal
- Rajapur, Nepal
- Birendranagar, Nepal
- Dhaka, Bangladesh
- Gazipur, Bangladesh
- Chittagong, Bangladesh
- Sylhet, Bangladesh

=== Parcel ===
Pathao Parcel is an on-demand service to send small to medium-sized packages inside Dhaka city with a minimal cost using the Pathao app. The parcel delivery is usually done through bicycles for nearby locations and motorcycles for longer distances. This service also requires the delivery person and sender to both have GPS enabled smartphones to match with a delivery person nearby.

=== E-Commerce delivery ===
Merchant Delivery was the basis of the foundation of Pathao back in 2015. Pathao delivers in 50+ cities in Bangladesh using their fleet of bicycle, motorcycle and pickup vans. Pathao accepts cash-on-delivery and returns of products on behalf of its merchants as well.

=== Food delivery ===
Pathao launched on-demand food delivery in Dhaka and Chittagong city in January 2018 and used bicycle deliveries to avoid the traffic. It directly competes with local and international delivery companies. A report by the Daily Star claimed that Pathao Food has 80% market share in the country. However, with increased competition from Foodpanda and Foodi, it is now at the third position.

== Pathao Nepal ==
On 12 September 2018, Pathao announced the launch of its bike-sharing operation in Kathmandu. Several recruitment advertisements for hiring operations managers, marketing managers, and executives were also seen on Nepalese job-seeking websites from August 2018. In May 2018 Pathao appointed Mr. Asheem Man Singh Basnyat as the managing director for Nepal. Pathao Nepal launched its bike services on 24 September 2018, car services on 9 August 2019, and food services on 2 October 2020.

== Issues ==
=== Pathao Pay ===
On 24 May 2018, Pathao launched its Mobile Wallet service termed as Pathao Pay, through which customers could pay the riders through the app without using cash.

A report published by a local news agency claimed that Bangladesh Bank denied Pathao to launch a Closed Payment Service. In a statement, Pathao Co-founder, Hussain M. Elius said that "We had faced a problem as we started the service as a closed wallet. We will turn the service into an open wallet in the future by fulfilling all the [regulations] and conditions."

=== Regulations ===
Bangladesh Road Transport Authority (BRTA) declared Ride Sharing Services illegal in Bangladesh due to conflicts with Bangladesh Motor Vehicles Act. Pathao along with several local Ride-sharing services petitioned against the rule and later lobbied the government to formulate a draft bill to allow operations of Ride-sharing services. The services remained open to the public and on 3 December 2017, the BRTA formulated a guideline for Ride-sharing services. Most of the Ride-sharing services including Pathao was given Operation License in February 2018. On 3 December, Pathao became the first major ride-sharing service in Bangladesh to get enlistment certificate from BRTA.
