= Madhumalla =

Village development committee in Koshi Zone, Nepal

Madhumalla मधुमल्ला
- Village development committee
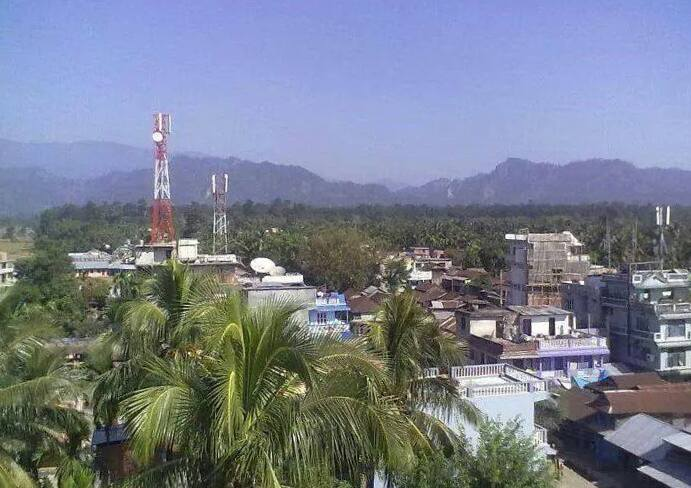
- Bird's eye view of Madhumalla

- Location in Nepal
- Coordinates: 26.73°N 87.63°E
- Country: Nepal
- Zone: Koshi Zone
- District: Morang District

Government
  - Sachib: Shiva Kumar Khatri

Population (2011)
  - Total: 21,482
- Time zone: UTC+5:43 (Nepal Time)
- Postal code: 56605
- Area code: 021

Madhumalla is a village development committee in Morang District in the Koshi Zone of south-eastern Nepal. With a population of 21,482 as of the 2011 Nepal census and situated at the foothills of Raja rani mountain, Madhumalla is a village sandwiched by two rivers Mawa and Nunsari. Its neighbours are Urlabari municipality to its south, Damak municipality to its east and south, and Illam district to its north. This village is at a distance of 7.3 km north of Urlabari

== Houses ==
The houses are made of different combinations of materials ranging from bamboo, cement, mud, wood, bricks and stones. They are mostly supported by wooden pillars, and the roofs are made of galvanised iron. All houses in rural areas and most in urban have gardens where different fruits, vegetables and trees are planted. There are many chautaris near the roads for people to rest. Tube well is the main source of water for household activities. Each house generally has a tube well though many houses may share one too. Firewood is the main source of fuel. Electricity has reached most parts of the village and is widely used.

== Economy ==
The economy is largely based on agriculture like most of the part of Nepal. The villagers bring their agricultural items grown in home to sell them directly or through vendors. There are no large-scale industries in the village though some small and medium scale are prevalent which are limited to bread factories, mills producing agro – products. Madhumalla depends upon Urlabari and Damak for most daily items necessary though some traders also go to India for trade. After the Rabi-Urlabari road is black topped, it is assumed the economic activity will take a surge.

== Education ==
The literacy rate was 75.43% as of 2011 census. There are 16 governmental schools educating the future of Madhumalla. Among them only Manohar and Bhagwati are higher secondary schools.

== Health ==
There is a governmental health post and one hospital, Sajha Hospital. There are about half dozen pharmacy.

== Transportation ==
Buses are the chief means of transportation in Madhumalla. One can reach there from Biratnagar airport to Madhumalla by bus directly. Buses from major cities like Kakarvitta, Dharan, Kathmandu also leave from there. Shree Hari Om pashupati which travel urlabari - toribari is the oldest and very popular bus among locals. A few rickshaws are also available from bus stop. With the recently black topped roads and improved economy motorcycles, cars are getting popular among the rich ones.

== Tourism ==
Exploring the Mawa Nunsari forest, Khuddi picnic spot are major places of tourist attractions. Recently inaugurated suspension bridge at Kuinetaar, Toribari has shown some promising future in the tourism sector of Madhumalla. About hundred picnic groups visit this picnic spot every year. According to locals, the business in shops and fast food restaurants has increased rapidly following the bridge inauguration.

== Sports ==
Football is the most popular sport. Regional, local and school level games are often held.

== Security ==
Without a police station for several years, Madhumalla went to a state of anarchy. The number of thugs, robbers, murderers increased enormously. The widening political division and proper programmes have done anything but help in this transitional phase. During the Maoist conflict, the VDC office was burnt and destroyed. Many people were kidnapped, tortured during this period. The police station was restored after the Maoist conflict ended.

== Problems ==
Politics is an important factor affecting the people in everyday life. Like the rest of the country, politics is badly affecting the educational, service sector and the overall development of Madhumalla. Majority of youths are in the gulf countries working as low skilled labourers. Too many local politicians who are without any leadership capabilities have been elected in the recent local level election from whom very little development can be anticipated. The importance of higher education is less emphasized and about 80% of girls get married upon completion of grade 12 Examination. Most of the boys go abroad as foreign workers by the age 20 or less. With recently blacktopped road connecting it to Urlabari, a ray of hope can be seen that it could grow into an emergent city within the next decade.
