= Fahim Saleh =

Bangladeshi-American entrepreneur (1986–2020)

- ফাহিম সালেহ
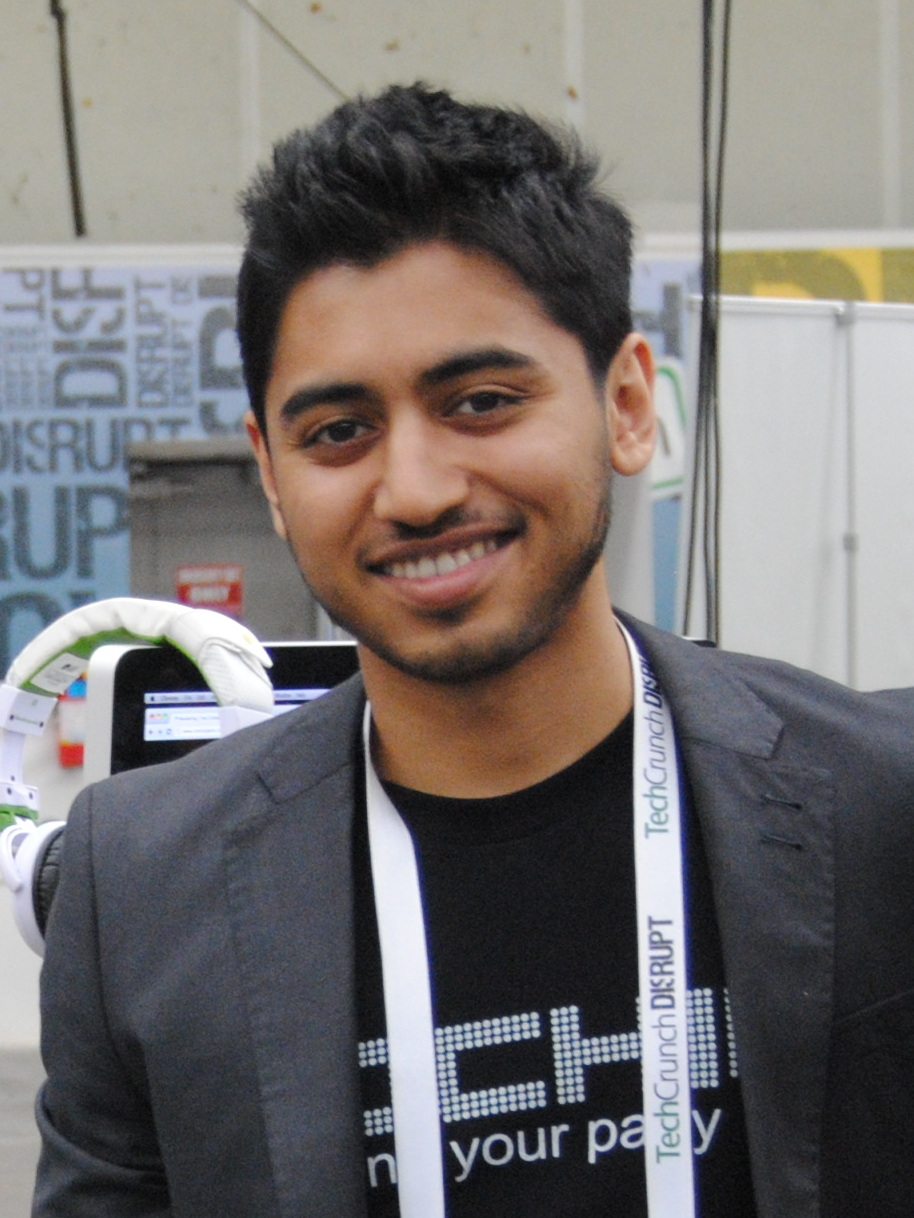
- Born: December 12, 1986; Mecca, Saudi Arabia
- Died: July 13, 2020 (aged 33); New York City, U.S.
- Education: Bentley University, 2009
- Occupations: Investor; entrepreneur
- Known for: Founder of Gokada
- Title: Founding partner of Adventure Capital; Founder of Gokada; Founder of Pathao; Co-founder of JoBike

Fahim Saleh (Bengali: ফাহিম সালেহ; December 12, 1986 – July 13, 2020) was a Bangladeshi-American entrepreneur and computer programmer who founded Gokada in Nigeria, as well as Pathao and JoBike. He was also a founding partner of Adventure Capital, a Manhattan-based venture capital firm.

== Biography ==
Saleh was born in Saudi Arabia to Bangladeshi parents who frequently relocated for work, before settling in Rochester, New York. He taught himself to program at a young age and created various online projects, including a website for his family, a teenage social platform, and a prank call service, PrankDial. After graduating from Bentley University, he said he wanted to create something that "adds legitimate value to humanity." He launched his first company while in high school. He used income from PrankDial to fund his other ventures. The service was controversial for being misused as a harassment tool.

In 2015, Saleh founded the ride-sharing company Pathao, popular in Bangladesh and Nepal. The company was later valued at $100 million. In 2018, Saleh founded Gokada, a Nigerian motorbike ride-hailing company. The company raised millions in funding but faced a major setback when Lagos authorities banned motorbike taxis in 2020. He also invested in Picap, a Colombian ride-sharing company.

Friends dubbed Saleh the "Elon Musk of the developing world." Complex estimated his net worth at $150 million.

== Death ==
On July 14, 2020, Saleh's body was found dismembered in his Lower East Side apartment. Police determined he had been killed the day before.

On the night of July 13, neighbors heard shouting from Saleh's apartment. When his cousin couldn't reach him, she visited and discovered his remains, prompting a police response. Authorities found his torso and an electric saw, with his limbs and head in separate bags. The medical examiner ruled the cause of death as multiple stab wounds. Detectives classified this case as a homicide. A police source told The New York Times that Saleh was followed by a man dressed in black into the key-secured elevator that led to his apartment on the seventh floor. Security footage depicted Saleh headed out of the elevator into his apartment with the man dressed in black following behind with a taser and Fahim falling onto his apartment floor. Saleh's cousin arrived to find the crime scene while the killer was visiting a Home Depot for more supplies.

On July 17, Saleh's assistant, 21-year-old Tyrese Devon Haspil, was arrested and charged with his murder. Surveillance footage showed Haspil using Saleh's credit card and purchasing cleaning supplies and tools afterward at Home Depot.

=== Reactions ===
Saleh's death shocked the tech community. Gokada described him as "a great leader, inspiration and positive light for all of us." Pathao also paid tribute.

== Trials ==
The case against Tyrese Devon Haspil was adjourned until January 11, 2021. Tyrese Devon Haspil pleaded not guilty. In early 2024, Haspil stated that he will present an insanity defense for his trial to a Manhattan jury, alleging he suffered from "extreme emotional disturbance." His case is represented by Legal Aid Society lawyer Sam Roberts. If he is able to convince the jury, his charges could possibly be reduced to manslaughter, which carries a sentence of 5 to 20 years, as opposed to 20 years to life for murder.

On September 10, 2024, Haspil was sentenced to 40 years to life in state prison.
