= Sundarpur, Morang =

Town in Morang, Nepal

Sunderpur सुन्दरपुर is a town under Sundar Dulari Municipality in Morang District in the Koshi Zone of south-eastern Nepal. At the time of the 1991 Nepal census it had a population of 11,447 people living in 2143 individual households. Sundarpur is home to Purbanchal University. Gothgaon, a small beautiful town in Nepal is the main location of the eastern region university.

The Purwanchal University has stated that it will run a teaching hospital in the recently constructed buildings at Gothgaun in Morang district. Purbanchal University plans to establish a 300-bed district-level teaching hospital of the College of Medical and Allied Sciences. At least nine modern building have been constructed on over 800 bighas of land made available for the university by the government. The Eastern Regional University is working to establish the first digital library in the country. Founded in 2053 BS with the objective of making higher education qualitative, employment-oriented and skilled and providing vocational education to all, the university has been striving hard to consolidate its physical infrastructure. The forest area in Gothgaon of Morang district is to be used for various purposes like production-oriented scientific forestry, herbs production and an agriculture forest.
