= Gokada =

Nigerian tech startup

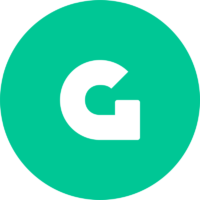
- Company type: Tech
- Industry: Logistics & Food Delivery
- Founded: 2017
- Founder: Fahim Saleh, Deji Oduntan
- Headquarters: Lagos State, Nigeria
- Services: Logistics & Food Delivery
- Website: www.gokada.ng

Gokada is a tech startup based in Lagos, Nigeria. The startup launched as a ride-hailing company in 2017, before diversifying into Logistics and Food Delivery in 2020 after a ban on commercial motorcycles by the Government of Lagos State.

== History ==
Gokada was co-founded by the late Fahim Saleh and Deji Oduntan in 2017, as a bike-hailing company. Before launching Gokada in Nigeria, Late Fahim Saleh, had founded Pathao in 2013, a popular ride company based in Bangladesh. He moved to Lagos in 2017, working with the help of his co-founder, Deji Oduntan, to launch Gokada. In March 2019, the late Fahim Saleh took over as the CEO of Gokada, after his co-founder Deji stepped down from the role. The company also raised a Series A funding of $5.3 million in 2019, having acquired approximately 1,000 motorcycles and completed nearly 1,000,000 rides.

On October 18, 2024, Gokada filed for Chapter 11 bankruptcy protection.

== Ban of Gokada in Lagos State ==
In January 2020, the Lagos State State Government announced a ban on commercial motorcycles, which also affected Gokada and other motorcycle ride-hailing companies operating in Lagos State. As a result of the ban, Gokada had to lay off about 80% of its workforce. Late Fahim Saleh had said in a statement that Gokada was about to enter into profit before the ban by the Lagos State Government was announced.

=== Diversifying into Logistics and Food Delivery ===
The ban on Motorcycles by the Lagos State Government had an exemption for dispatch riders. In February 2020, Gokada took advantage of this exemption and announced that it was diversifying into package delivery using its existing motorcycles and riders. In the same month, Gokada was reported to have partnered with Jumia Food on food deliveries, while it worked on launching its own platform. Later in 2020, Gokada would launch Gshop, its own food delivery service by partnering with restaurants to deliver food to its users on their platform.

In June 2021, Gokada announced that it had surpassed $100,000,000 (100 million USD) in annual transaction value and had completed over 1 million food delivery and ecommerce orders for over 30,000 merchants in 12 months.

=== Death of CEO ===
On the 15th of July, 2020, the death of the CEO of Gokada, late Fahim Saleh was announced. He was found dead in his New York Apartment by the Police on the 14th of July, 2020, murdered by multiple stabbed wounds. On the 17th of July, late Fahim's Personal Assistant, Tyrese Haspil, was arrested and charged with the murder of the late CEO. He was alleged to have owed Fahim tens of thousands of dollars.

== New CEO Appointed ==
After the death of Fahim Saleh, Gokada appointed Nikhil Goel as the new CEO in March 2021. He had been leading the Gokada team since death of Fahim. Before joining Gokada, Goel was the General Manager of Zomato, an online food delivery startup based in India and the former head of Head of Verticals at SafeBoda in Kenya.

== Launch of Super App ==
In 2021 Gokada launched its Super App, which allows its customers access its food delivery, Ecommerce, ride-hailing and logistics services on the same App platform. Before the Super App, Gokada had a separate App for its logistics (GSend) and its food delivery (GShop) services. The tech startup made the decision to combine its services in one Super App after it said its users requested that they put all the services on one platform.

=== Relaunch of Ride-hailing Services ===
With the launch of the Super App also came the relaunch its ride hailing services after it expanded to two states in Nigeria; Oyo State and Ogun State. The two states do not have a ban in place against commercial motorcycles.
