= Drabesha =

Darbesha दर्वेशा Demonym: Drabeshiyans
- Village development committee
- Motto: Let's get united and Develop
- Location in Nepal
- Coordinates: 26.51°N 87.49°E
- Country: Nepal
- Province: Province No. 1
- District: Morang District

Population (2010)
  - Total: 18,047
- Time zone: UTC+5:45 (Nepal Standard Time (NST))

Darbesha is a village development committee and the abode of Drabeshiyans (native inhabitants) in Morang District in Koshi Province of south-eastern Nepal. It has been merged with Rangeli and known as part of the Rangeli Municipality since 2073 B.S. At the time of the 1991 Nepal census it had a population of 14,565 people living in 2709 individual households.

It was supposed to be only VDC in Nepal where signal of mobile and wireless service is not available. Although Ncell and NTC have built low quality smaller towers on neighbouring Rangeli and Kanepokhari routes, no signal was felt on device on this VDC. Ranjani Chowk in Darbesha only received signal which was extremely low. But it does receive signal of Ncell with the internet capacity of 2G now. NTC signals cannot be received yet, however. Cable TV and electricity has reached there. Recent Survey estimates that if huge tower would be installed in Darbesha-1, it would be able to serve good quality of signal to smartphone and mobile users in whole Darbesha including neighbouring VDCs.

== Population ==
Major languages in this VDC includes Nepali and Maithili.

This VDC is thickly populated with major Nepalese ethnic groups such as Rajbanshi, Tajpuriya, Poudar Brahmins, Maithil (indigenous Madhesi), Hill Brahmins and Chhetri.

Historical population
Year	Pop.	±%
1991	14,565	—
2001	16,698	+14.6%
2006	18,661	+11.8%
2010	18,047	−3.3%
