= Itahari International College =

Private undergraduate college in Morang, Nepal

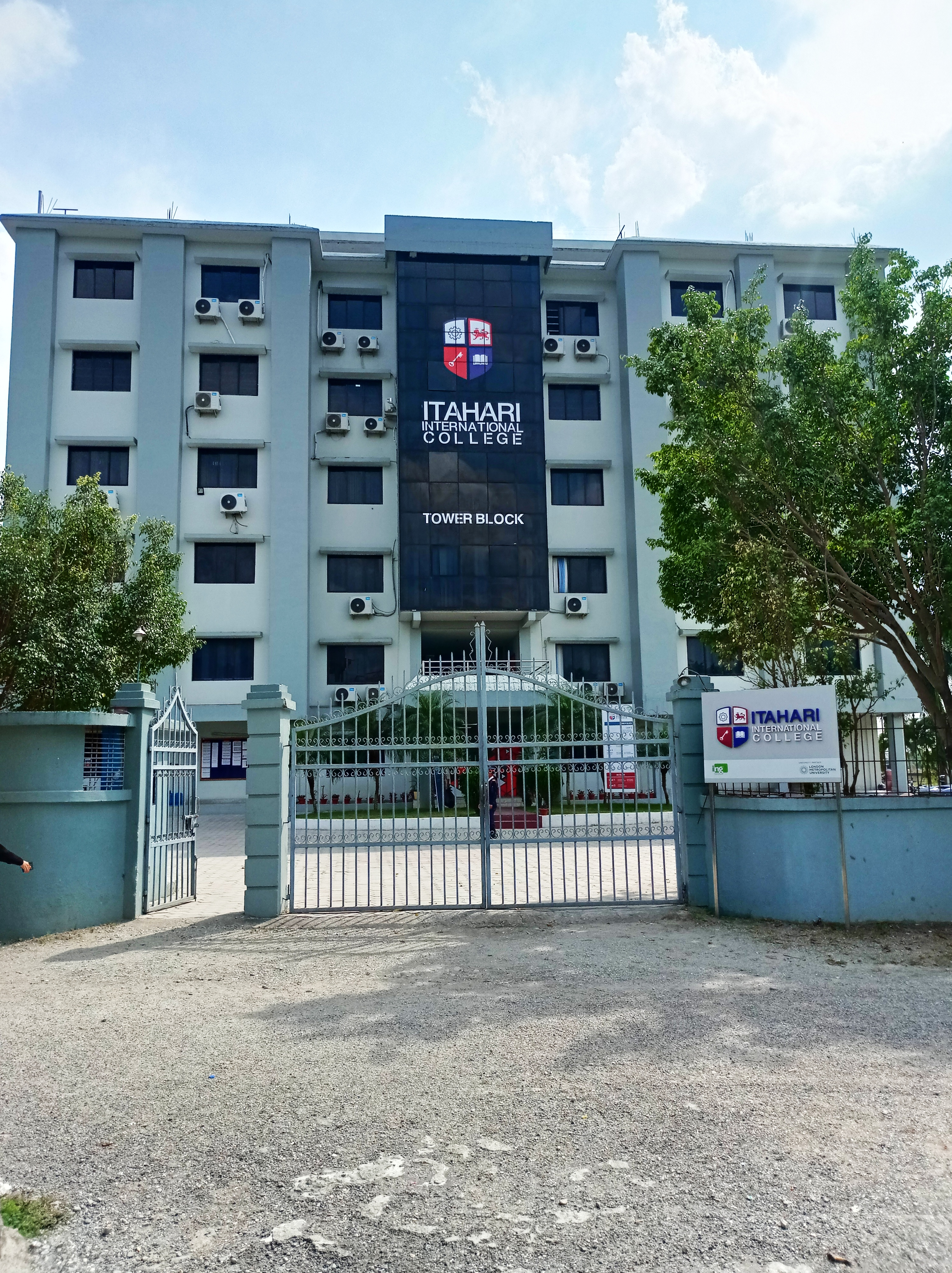
- Tower Block, Main Building
- Motto in English: Transforming Lives Through Education.
- Type: Private undergraduate college
- Established: 2017 A.D.
- Founder: Sulav Budhathoki
- Parent institution: Islington College
- Accreditation: Approved by the Ministry of Education, Nepal; Quality Assurance and Accreditation (QAA) Certification
- Affiliations: Innovative Nepal Group (ING)
- Academic affiliations: London Metropolitan University
- Officer in charge: Student Service: Pradip Bhandari; Academic Head: Achyut Bhattarai (BBA); Nishan Gautam (BBA); Santosh Parajuli (BIT); Marketing Head: Shyam Adhikari; University Assessment Controller: Saphal Sapkota
- Chairperson: Lekhnath Ghimire
- Chancellor: Dr. Wendy Bloisi
- President: Satyabrat Koirala
- Principal: Satyabrat Koirala
- Dean: Dr. Dakshata Rana Shah
- Head of Operations: Nikhil Shakya
- Academic staff: 30+ FTE
- Administrative staff: 40 FTE
- Location: Sundar Dulari Chowk, Morang, Koshi Province, Nepal; 26.6554°N 87.3020°E
- Campus: Urban
- Language: English
- Colors: Red & blue
- Website: iic.edu.np

Itahari International College (IIC) is an information technology and business college in Sundar Haraicha, Nepal, established in 2017. The college directly partners with London Metropolitan University (London Met) of United Kingdom offering the honorary undergraduate degrees in BA (Hons) in Business Administration and B.Sc. (Hons) in Computing. The college is a flagship institution of Innovative Nepal Group (ING) organization.

== History ==
Located in Sundar Dulari Chowk Morang, the college was established in early 2017 with a joint venture between Islington College and Vishwa Adarsha College of Itahari.

== Admission ==
=== Advanced level Qualifications (A-levels) ===
- NEB passed with 2.2 CGPA (C) or above.
- Mathematics score of 2.4 GPA (C+) or above in SEE.
- English score of 2.4 GPA (C+) or above in NEB.

The applicants not meeting the aforementioned criteria for English can do one of the following tests:

- Pass in General English language test given by the college or IELTS score 6.0 or PTE 53.

=== Scholarship ===
The Academics, Attendance, and Attitude (AAA) Scholarship is awarded to students for excellent college performance by waiving 100% of their tuition costs for the whole calendar year.

== Academic Programmes ==
=== IT Degree (Undergraduate) ===
Stream	Programme	Specialization	Total modules	Credit hours	Duration	Level	Ref.
B.Sc	Information Technology	Computer networking	17	360	3 years	Undergraduate	

=== Business Degree (Undergraduate) ===
Stream	Programme	Specialization	Total Modules	Credit hours	Duration	Level	Ref.
B.A	Business Administration	International business	26	420	3.5 years	Undergraduate	
B.A	Business Administration	Digital Business Management	27	420	3.5 years	Undergraduate	

== Events ==
=== Curricular ===
==== Hackathon (For Bsc. Computing) ====
This is annually held IT event conducted by ING group in collaborative partnership with parent Institution Islington College. In 2023, college held the program with their own title IIC Quest 2023 with the support of Nepal domestic IT firm, Vertex web surf p.v.t ltd.

==== IIC Innovex (For BBA) ====
Every year, the inter-college management fest is organized and host by the college with the sole purpose of enhancing business knowledge horizon in students from the colleges of different provinces of Nepal. The college also places the invitation for international students participation in the event.

The event runs for 3 days with different tasks provided under the variety of management themes including finance, marketing, Law, entrepreneurship and International Relations.

=== Non-curricular ===
==== Spring Carnival ====
Annually, the IIC Spring Carnival brings staff and students together for a remarkable fiesta of ethnicity. It is noted for its exuberant celebrations and cultural exhibition with visitors exhibiting their ethnic identities through their dresses and performance to reflect the Nepal rich cultural traditions.

== Buildings ==
=== Tower Block ===
The main building includes two academic heads, one for each program. The lower part usually filled with staff's room, regulatory rooms and officer In Charge room. The level 2 and level 3 are used as a tutorial and workshop classes for BSc. computing. The Level 4 and Level 5 are typically used for BBA classes and staff meetings.

=== UK Block ===
The second building is used for Guest lecture session, ceremonial events and Lecture session for most of the IT classes, whereas Tutorial and workshop session for most of the classes of BBA.

=== ING Block ===
The third building is solely owned and operated under the ING Skill Academy umbrella used for the discussion and practices of curricular and non-curricular event functions and their execution.

== See also ==
- Islington College
- London Metropolitan University
