= Kurule Tenupa =

Village in Dhankuta, Nepal

Kurule Tenupa is a village Development Committee of Dhankuta District in Nepal. It is far from the headquarters of Dhankuta District. Dhankuta is linked with Kurule Tenupa via road. It takes about six hours to reach Kurule Tenupa from Dhankuta. In the past, this village was not so much developed but now the living standard of people is high. Most of the people here depend on Agriculture. Young men are going for foreign employment which has increased the inflow of money. But the miserable situation of this village can be seen when there will be scarcity of water. Due to lack of water resources, people living here are migrating to Terai areas like Urlabari, Damak, and other plain areas of Eastern Nepal.
