= Rishikesh Pokharel =

Nepali politician

- ऋषिकेश पोखरेल

Member of Parliament, Pratinidhi Sabha
- In office 26 December 2022 – 26 March 2026
- Preceded by: Minendra Rijal
- Succeeded by: Krishna Kumar Karki
- Constituency: Morang 2

Personal details
- Born: 1 November 1967 (age 58) Morang District
- Party: CPN (UML)

Rishikesh Pokharel is a Nepalese politician, belonging to the CPN (UML) who served as a member of the 2nd Federal Parliament of Nepal. In the 2022 Nepalese general election, he was elected from the Morang 2 (constituency). He held the position of Chairman of the Public Accounts Committee (PAC) in Nepal's Federal Parliament. He was the chairman of the powerful Public Accounts Committee in the parliament. His wife is accused of cooperative fraud.
