= Sundar Haraicha Municipality =

Sundar Haraicha सुन्दर हरैंचा
- Municipality (नगरपालिका)
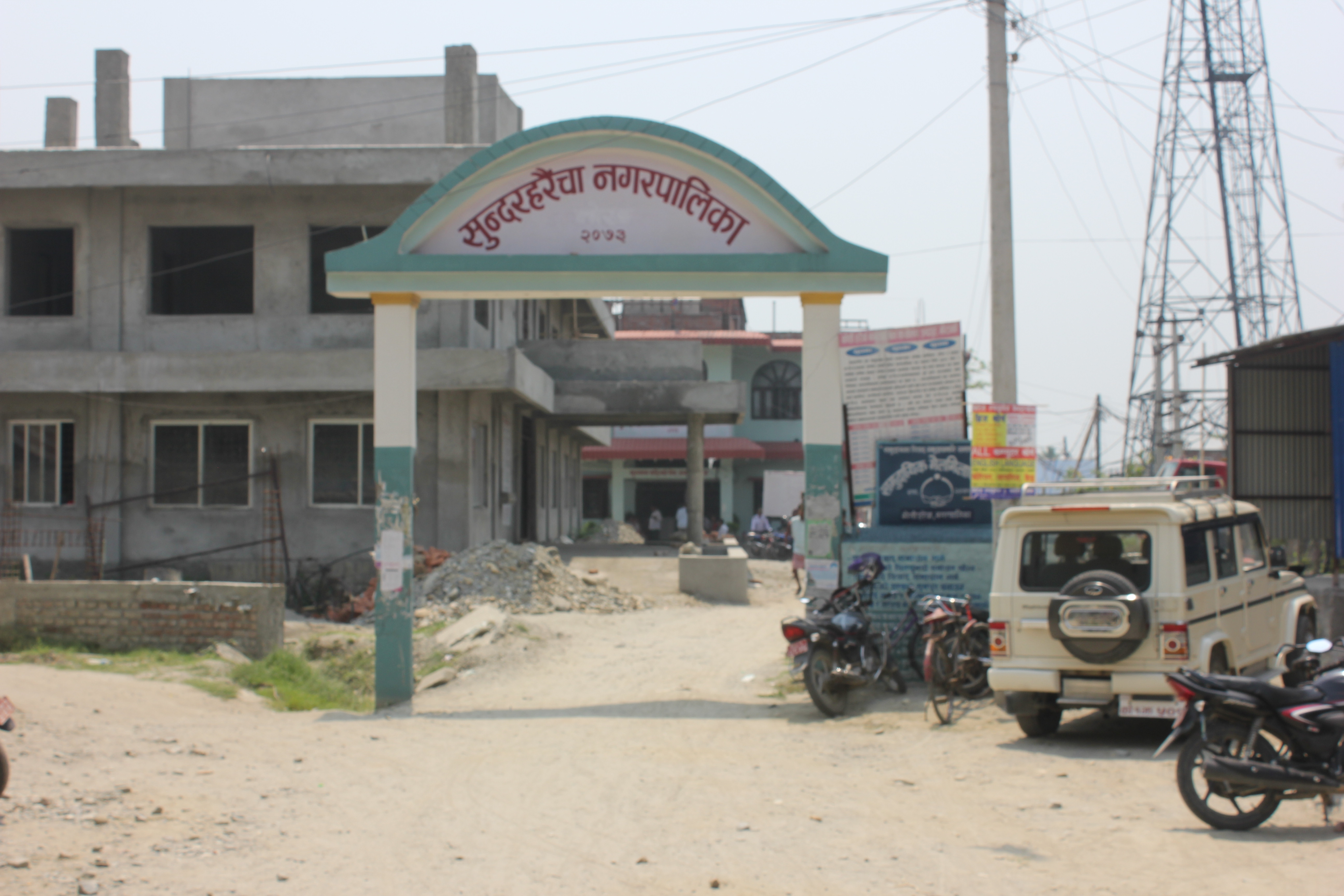
- SundarHaraicha Municipality

- Location of Sundar Haraicha in map of Koshi Province Sundar Haraicha (Nepal)
- Coordinates: 26.668203°N 87.385310°E
- Country: Nepal
- Province: Koshi Province
- District: Morang
- Wards: 12

Government
  - Mayor: Kedar Prasad Guragain (CPN-UML)
  - Deputy Mayor: Akali Chaudhary (CPN-UML)

Area
  - Total: 110 km^{2} (42 sq mi)

Population (2021 Nepal census)
  - Total: 121,305
  - Rank: 28th (Nepal); 5th (Koshi Province)
  - Density: 1,100/km^{2} (2,900/sq mi)
- Time zone: UTC+5:45 (NST)
- Website: Official website

Sundar Haraicha (Nepali: सुन्दर हरैंचा) is a municipality in Morang District of Koshi Province in Nepal. It is centered around Biratchowk town which is the gateway to Biratnagar. It borders Itahari sub-metropolitan city to the west, Dharan sub-metropolitan city to the northwest and Belbari municipality to the east and is connected by Mahendra Highway. It is one of the fastest growing cities in eastern Nepal and the second largest city of Morang district after Biratnagar, with 121,305 inhabitants living in 26,677 households. It includes many smaller towns, including Salakpur, Biratchowck, Khorsane, Gachhiya, Haraicha, Dulari, and Baliya. It consists of the town centres of Biratchowk and Gothgaun which are parts of the Greater Birat Development Area which incorporates the cities of Biratnagar-Itahari-Gothgau-Biratchowk-Dharan primarily located on the Koshi Highway in Eastern Nepal, with an estimated total urban agglomerated population of 804,300 people living in 159,332 households.

It was established on 10 March 2017 by merging the former municipalities Sundar Dulari(Sundarpur VDC and Dulari VDC) and Koshi Haraicha(Indrapur VDC, Mirgulia VDC and Haraicha VDC). At the time of the 2011 Nepal census, the localities formed had a joint population of 80,518 people living in 18,610 individual households.

== History ==
On 10 March 2017, Sundar Haraicha was created through merging the former municipalities Sundar Dulari and Koshi Haraicha. The total population of all the predecessor villages of this municipality stands at 80,518 people living in 18,610 individual households in 2011 Nepal census.

=== Sundar Dulari ===
Sundar Dulari Municipality was a municipality in Morang District in southeastern Nepal. The municipality was formed by the Government of Nepal merging two villages i.e. Sundarpur and Dulari in May 2014. At the time of the 1991 Nepal census it had a population of 6860 people living in 1,262 individual households. Sundarpur had a population of 18,765 and Dulari had a population of 14,030 in the 2011 Nepal census making the total population of Sundar-Dulari at 32,795 inhabitants in 2011.

=== Koshi Haraicha ===
Koshi Haraicha Municipality was a municipality in Morang District in southeastern Nepal. Earlier, the municipality was formed merging the three existing villages, Haraicha, Mrigaulia, and Indrapur, in May 2014. At the time of the 1991 Nepal census it had a population of 10,592 living in 1,930 households. The three predecessor villages, Haraicha, Mrigaulia, and Indrapur had a population of 6,484, 14,117 and 27,122 respectively in the 2011 Nepal census making a total of 47,723 inhabitants.

== Locations and names of head of Ward Office ==
- Ward No.1 Haraicha, १ नं. वडा कार्यालय, हरैंचा
- Ward No.2 Mrigaulia, २ नं. वडा कार्यालय, मृगौलिया
- Ward No.3 Gachhiya, ३ नं. वडा कार्यालय, गछिया
- Ward No.4 Dulari, ४ नं. वडा कार्यालय, दुलारी
- Ward No.5 Khoksi, ५ नं वडा कार्यालय, खोक्सी
- Ward No.6 Sundarpur, ६ नं वडा कार्यालय, सुन्दरपुर
- Ward No.7 Thadiya, ७ नं वडा कार्यालय, ठाडिया
- Ward No.8 Chiram, ८ नं वडा कार्यालय, सलकपुर
- Ward No.9 Budhabare, ९ नं वडा कार्यालय, बुधबारे
- Ward No.10 Khorsane, १० नं वडा कार्यालय, खोर्साने
- Ward No.11 Karjuna, ११ नं वडा कार्यालय, कर्जुना
- Ward No.12 Biratchowk, १२ नं वडा कार्यालय, विराटचौक

== Colleges and Schools ==
- Purbanchal University, Salakpur https://purbanchaluniversity.edu.np/
- Sukuna Multiple Campus, Khorsane
- Pravat Kiran Secondary English Schoolwww.prabhatkiran.edu.np, Salakpur
- Bright Future Secondary School, Salakpur
- Itahari International College, Dulari
- Tender Feet Boarding School, Bansbari
- Safal Sidhhartha Boarding School, Bansbari
- Sajilal Higher Secondary School, Dulari
- Subijimur School, Biratchowk
- Janata higher Secondary School, Haraicha
- Bal Pratibha English Secondary School, Sundarharaicha
- Sukuna Secondary School, Biratchowk
- Quest English School, Salakpur

== Tourist Area ==
- गोकुलम रिसोर्ट
- गोकर्ण रिसोर्ट
- हसिना सिमसार
- बाघझोड़ा
- सलकपुर पाथिभरा मन्दिर
- Gaushala Mandir
- Triveni Resort
- Bhulke Simsar Salakpur

== Transportation ==
Mahendra Highway (East-West Highway) passes 21 km through Sundar Haraicha Municipality and links the municipality to the national main road link of Nepal.

== Healthcare ==
Many Hospitals is here.

- Purbanchal University Teaching Hospital, Salakpur(Gothgaun)
- Municipality Hospital, Haraincha

== Town Centers ==
=== Major Town Centers ===
- Biratchowk
- Salakpur
- GothGaun
- Gachhiya
- Haraicha
- Khorsane
- Mrigauliya

=== Sub Town Centers ===
- Indrapur
- Sundarpur
- Aadarsha Chowk
- Laxmipur
- Kumargaun
- Bansbari Sundarpur
- Tinpaini Sundarpur
- Dulari Morang

== Local Election ==
=== Local Election 2074 ===
Not Available

=== Local Election 2079 ===
Sundarharaicha Municipality is in Morang district of Koshi Province. There are 71,756 eligible voters for the Nepal local elections 2022, according to the Election Commission. There are 12 wards in the metropolitan city with a total population of 121,305.

- Total Population : 121,305
- Number of Wards : 12
- Election Center : 25
- Number of Male Eligible Voters : 34,726
- Number of Female Eligible Voters : 37,029
- Number of Other Eligible Voters : 1
- Total Eligible Voters : 71,756

Parties	Mayor/Chairperson	Deputy Mayor/Chairperson
Nepali Congress	Shiva Prasad Dhakal	-
CPN (Unified Marxist–Leninist)	Kedar Prasad Guragain	Akali Chaudhari
CPN (Maoist Centre)	-	Navaraj Chapagain
CPN (Unified Socialist)	-	Mahesh Kumar Acharya
Bibeksheel Sajha Party	Hemanta Kumar Bhattarai	Sandhya Dahal
Mangol National Origination	Krishna Dev Rai	Sani Rai
Nepal samabeshi Party	Parshuram Ghimire	-
Rastriya Prajatantra Party	Ram Bahadur Khatri	Sumitra Basnet
Independents	Jiban Basnet	-
Independents	Kamal Adhikari	-
Independents	Kabiraj Pokhrel	-
Independents	Tikaram Gautam	-
Independents	Prakash Bhattrai	-
Independents	-	Man Bahadur Sarki
Independents	-	Kamala Devi Adhikari
Source: Election Commission of Nepal

== Notable people ==
- Yama Buddha, Rapper
- Dr Surya B. Parajuli
- Rekha Thapa, Actress
- Ashish Chaudhary, Footballer
- Shree Krishna Luitel {Salakpur}
