= Indrapur, Morang =

Indrapur इन्द्रपुर
- Emerged into Koshi Haraicha Municipality
- Location in Nepal
- Coordinates: 26.67°N 87.39°E
- Country: Nepal
- Zone: Kosi Zone
- District: Morang District
- Time zone: UTC+5:45 (Nepal Time)

Indrapur(इन्द्रपुर) is a town center under Kosi Haraicha Municipality (Currently merged with Sundar Dulari to form Sundar Haraicha) in Morang District in the Kosi Zone of south-eastern Nepal. Earlier it was a village development committee and was merged into Koshi Haraicha Municipality in May 2014.

Many small scale as well as large scale industries are established here. Temples including Krishna temple, Kali temple (one of the oldest temple of this area), Radha Krishna sivalaya mandir, etc. lies here. The main ethnic groups here are Brahmin, Chhetri, Rai, Limbu, Tharu, etc. Biratchowk is the most developed village in this VDC.
