= Labipur =

Labipur लबिपुर जय थरूहट
- Sub-Metropolitan City
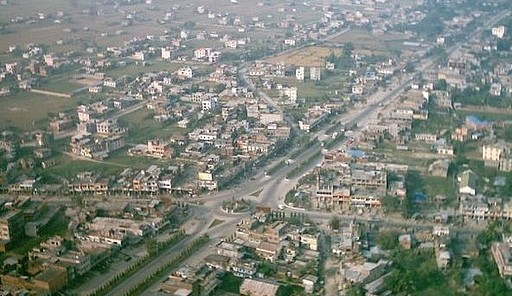
- Aerial view of Itahari

- Location in Nepal
- Coordinates: 26°40′N 87°15′E
- Country: Nepal
- Zone: Koshi Zone
- District: Sunsari District
- Established: 2014

Government
  - Type: Sub-metropolitan City

Area
  - Total: 87.3301 km^{2} (33.7183 sq mi)
  - Metro density: 1,774.88/km^{2} (4,596.9/sq mi)
- Time zone: UTC+5:45 (Nepal Time)
- Postal Code: 56705
- Area code: 025
- Website: http://itaharimun.gov.np

Labipur (Nepali: लबिपुर) is a Tharu village located in the Itahari sub-metropolitan city of Sunsari District in the Koshi Zone of south-eastern Nepal.

Labipur was previously included in the village development committee known as Hansposha.
