= Mrigauliya =

Mrigauliya मृगौलिया is a town under Sundar Haraicha Municipality in Morang District in the Kosi Zone in South-Eastern Nepal. At the time of the 1991 Nepal census it had a population of 10,577 people living in 1977 individual households.
