= Aadarsha Chowk Morang =

Aadarsha Chowk आदर्श चोक
- village
- Location in Nepal
- Coordinates: 26.674451°N 87.375137°E
- Country: Nepal
- Zone: Kosi Zone
- District: Morang District

Area
  - Total: 0.75 km^{2} (0.29 sq mi)
- Time zone: UTC+5:45 (NST)
- GPO: 56611
- Area code: 021

Aadarsha Chowk (Nepali: आदर्श चोक) is wedged between Tribeni chowk to the east and Jyoti Tol to the west, this is a village located at Sundar Haraincha Municipality -09, previously- Koshi Haraincha Municipality -02. The southern part is bordered with Mahendra Highway and the northern part falls under Char-Koshe Jhadi. About 1 km east of the village is the Biratchowk, headquarter of Sundar Haraincha. Addarsha Chowk is ethnically and religiously diverse place where majority of people follows Hinduism with beautiful and minority faiths upon Islam. This is the best example on how the people believing on different religion lives together with mutual respect and harmony. Nepali is the official and most-spoken language with very few community speaking Hindi. English language is well understood by educated mass.

== Area ==
Addarsha Chowk is located at Morang district, Koshi Zone of Eastern development region of Nepal. The geographical location of Aadarsha Chowk is at 26°40’28.0” N 87°22'30.5" E and the elevation is 146 m (479 ft) above sea-level. The total area of the village is about 0.7 km^{2} excluding the territory forest (Char Koshe Jhadi). It is approximately 387 km east of capital Kathmandu and 1 km west of Biratchowk, headquarters of the village.

== Ethnic Tribe & Religion ==
The major inhabitants of the village are Rai, Limbu, Magars, Chhettri and Brahmin. Hinduism is the largest religion in the village followed by Islam and Christianity in respective manner.
