= Amgachhi =

Place in Nepal

Amgachhi आमगाछी is a town and business center under Rangeli Municipality in Morang District in south-eastern Nepal. The village was submerged under Rangeli Municipality in May 2014 following the government decision.

At the time of the 2011 Nepal census it had a population of 5,203 people living in 1,179 individual households. It still lacks proper development in mind set as they still force girls to marry unwillingly.

The ward president of Amgachhi is Mahanand Mandal.
