= Sushma Godawari College =

- Itahari, Sunsari, Koshi Zone; Nepal

Information
- Type: Coeducational
- Motto: तमसो मा ज्योतिर्गमय
- Established: 1992 (2049 B.S.)
- Founders: (multi-founders)
- Principal: Mr. Bodha Raj Nepal
- Enrollment: c. 450
- Website: godawari.edu.np

Sushma Godawari College (Nepali: सुस्मा गोदावरी कलेज) is one of the oldest and largest college in Itahari, Nepal. Established in 1992 A.D. (2049 B.S.), Godawari College is affiliated with Tribhuwan University, offering 3-year BBS in both English and Nepali, and 4-year BSC-CSIT degrees.

It has also established the CTEVT-recognized Sushma Koirala Memorial Engineering College (SKMEC) in 2057 B.S. (c. 2000 A.D.), offering a 3-year Diploma in Civil and Computer Engineering. It also provides short-term training in plumbing, house wiring, along with electrical and electronics training.

The college has boarding facilities, libraries in both school and college, a canteen, Computers and Science labs and first aid facilities.

== See also ==
- Godawari Vidhya Mandir
