= Haraicha =

Municipality in Nepal

Haraicha हरैंचा is a town center under Sundarharaincha Municipality in Morang District in the Koshi Zone of south-eastern Nepal. Earlier it was a village development committee and was merged into Koshi Haraicha Municipality in May 2014. At the time of the 1991 Nepal census it had a population of 5,067 people living in 966 individual households. In Haraicha, many basic facilities are available, including a post office, police station, water station, primary health centre, mini sports stadium, and two boarding schools.

According to the 2021 Nepal census, Haraicha has a total population of 7,335, with 3,560 males and 3,775 females. The town has seen significant growth in infrastructure and basic facilities.
