= Merryland College Biratnagar =

School in Biratnagar, Nepal

Biratnagar International College
- Type: College
- Established: 2013
- Affiliations: University of Wolverhampton
- Location: Biratnagar, Nepal
- Website: merrylandcollege.edu.np

Biratnagar International College (BIC) is an educational institution offering undergraduate courses in Biratnagar, Nepal. It was established in 2013 A.D. in joint partnership with stakeholders from Islington College, Kathmandu (Islington College). This venture was supported by ING Academy, a social education entrepreneurship, based in New Zealand who actively support the institution in its operations and maintain the international standard of education. The objective is to provide internationally recognized tertiary education at affordable prices in Biratnagar. It is a part of ING. BIC offers a BA degree in international business management from the University of Wolverhampton. BIC signed a memorandum of understanding with Wolverhampton in April 2013.
