= SOS Hermann Gmeiner Higher Secondary School, Itahari =

School in Nepal

Coordinates: 26.6610°N 87.2414°E

SOS Hermann Gmeiner Higher Secondary School Itahari is a school located in Itahari Sub Metropolis Nepal. The School spanned in 8 Bigha area comprises Children Village (Orphanage), Community center and Higher Secondary School. The school students have got facilities of an open auditorium and a playground in the school premises. The School and children village facility was established under the global philanthropic partnership of SOS Children Villages established by Hermann Gmeiner an Austrian philanthropist.

== Management ==
The SOS children villages, Itahari is led by Mr.Chaudhary and The school is currently managed by Shashi Kumar Upadhyaya, the Principal of the school and Prakash Timsina, the Vice principal of the school.

== School ==
The school runs classes from Nursery to grade 12. Over a thousand students from the orphanage as well as surrounding community study in the school.

== Children Village ==
SOS Children Village, Itahari including the school was founded after the devastating Earthquake in 1988 in the eastern Nepal especially focusing the parentless students. The school has been providing parenting facilities to parentless children via the Children village. The children village has got an orphanage comprising 14 houses. A mother in each house give parenthood to the kid.

== Community Center ==
The community center runs various activities to enhance skills of women in the surrounding area of the school. Local Tharu, Musahar, Doms community women participate in the activities of the community.
