= Foodi =

Bangladeshi meal delivery and grocery delivery website

Foodi Express Limited
- Trade name: foodi
- Type: Private
- Industry: Online food ordering; Online grocer
- Founded: 2022; 4 years ago in Dhaka, Bangladesh
- Headquarters: Rahman's Regnum Centre (Lift-17), 191/B, Bir Uttam Mir Shawkat Sharak, Dhaka 1208, Dhaka, Bangladesh
- Area served: Bangladesh
- Key people: Shahnewas Mannan (CEO)
- Services: Food Delivery; Online grocery
- Owner: US-Bangla Group
- Number of employees: 300+
- Divisions: Foodimart
- Website: foodibd.com

Foodi is a Bangladeshi on-demand food and grocery delivery company headquartered in Dhaka, Bangladesh. It is a part of US-Bangla group.

It operates in 27 districts, making around 1 million deliveries per month. They have more than 10,000 registered riders. It has the second most market share of the Bangladeshi food delivery sector, behind Foodpanda and before Pathao Foods.

== History ==
Foodi was commercially launched in June 2024, after being established in 2022.

In May 2025, assuming 550,000 - 600,000 monthly orders, an official from Foodi estimated a 38% market share. They also launched food rescue feature, that allows customers to repurchase unfulfilled orders at discounted rates.

In April 2026, it launched foodimart, a grocery delivery service. It purports to deliver groceries within 15 minutes in designated areas.

=== Partnerships ===
In May 2026, Bangladeshi-heritage footballer Hamza Choudhury was appointed as the official brand ambassador for Foodi. Foodi has partnered with local restaurants, telecom, and banks to expand their service. It has also bought insurance for its top riders, and states this will later be extended to all riders.
