= Dadarbairiya =

Coordinates: 26°30′N 87°23′E

Darbairiya दादरबेरीया
- Village development committee
- Interactive map of Darbairiya
- Country: Nepal
- Zone: Kosi Zone
- District: Morang District

Population (1991)
  - Total: 6,280
- Time zone: UTC+5:45 (Nepal Time)

Darbairiya is a village development committee in Morang District in the Kosi Zone of south-eastern Nepal. At the time of the 1991 Nepal census it had a population of 6280 people living in 1110 individual households.
