= Hathimudha =

Hathimudha हात्तीमुडा
- Village development committee
- Location in Nepal
- Coordinates: 26.57°N 87.31°E
- Country: Nepal
- Zone: Kosi Zone
- District: Morang District

Population (1991)
  - Total: 6,190
- Time zone: UTC+5:45 (Nepal Time)

Hathimudha is a village development committee in Morang District in the Kosi Zone of south-eastern Nepal. At the time of the 1991 Nepal census, it had a population of 6190 people living in 1186 individual households.
