= Godawari Vidhya Mandir =

School in Itahari, Nepal

Coordinates: 26°39′29.91″N 87°24′59.46″E

Godawari Vidya Mandir
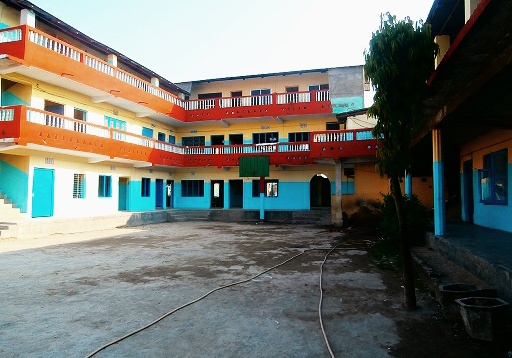
- A view of Godawari Vidhya Mandir
- Itahari, Sunsari, Koshi Zone; Nepal

Information
- Type: Coeducational
- Motto: तमसाे मा ज्याेतिर्गमय
- Established: 1992 (2049 B.S.)
- Founders: (multi-founders)
- Principal: Mr. Bodha Raj Nepal(College); Mr. Khem Prasad Nepal (School)
- Enrollment: c. 1200
- Website: www.sushmagodawari.edu.np (College website) www.godawarihss.edu.np (School website)

Godawari Vidhya Mandir (Nepali: गोदावरी विद्या मन्दिर) is one of the oldest schools in Itahari, Nepal. Established in 1992 AD (2049 B.S.) the HSEB-affiliated school has an enrollment of over 1200 students.

== About ==
The school also runs Sushma Godawari College, affiliated with Tribhuwan University, offering 3-year BBS in both English and Nepali, and 4-year BSC-CSIT degrees. The school also established the CTEVT-recognized Sushma Koirala Memorial Engineering College (SKMEC) in 2057 B.S. (2000 AD), offering a 3-year Diploma in Civil and Computer Engineering. It also provides short-term training in plumbing, house wiring, along with electrical and electronics training.

== Background ==
GVM is located at Itahari-7, Sunsari district. Since its beginning, GVM has received the best result performance in SLC.

== Facilities ==
Audio-visual class, science and computer lab, library, school bus service, and canteen. A Montessori class for pre-primary level has been started since 2072 BS.
