= Amaibariyati =

Place in Nepal

Coordinates: 26°26′N 87°24′E

Amaibariyati अमहिवरयाती
- Village development committee
- Interactive map of Amaibariyati
- Country: Nepal
- Zone: Kosi Zone
- District: Morang District

Population (1991)
  - Total: 5,473
- Time zone: UTC+5:45 (Nepal Time)

Amaibariyati is a village development committee in Morang District in the Kosi Zone of south-eastern Nepal. At the time of the 1991 Nepal census it had a population of 5473 people living in 1133 individual households.
