= Shristi Bhattarai =

Nepalese Politician

The Honourable Shristi Bhattarai
- सृष्टि भट्टराई

Member of Parliament, Pratinidhi Sabha
- Incumbent
- Assumed office 27 March 2026
- Constituency: PR

Personal details
- Born: 4 September 1998 (age 28) Itahari, Sunsari District, Nepal
- Citizenship: Nepalese
- Party: Rastriya Swatantra (since 2025)
- Parents: Dhruba Bhattarai (father); Saraswati Karki (mother)
- Education: Degree Campus, Biratnagar (MRD); Janata Multiple College, Itahari (BA)
- Profession: Politician

Shristi Bhattarai, also spelled as Srishti Bhattarai (Note: Nepali: सृष्टि भट्टराई) (born 4 September 1998) is a Nepalese politician and youth activist. She is currently serving as a member of parliament from the Rastriya Swatantra Party. She is a member of the 7th Pratinidhi Sabha elected through proportional representation under the Khas Arya female cluster.

Born and raised in Itahari, Bhattarai completed her primary education at Hamro Boarding School, Itahari. She joined the Rastriya Swatantra Party at the age of 27. After graduating from the Degree Campus, Biratnagar, she became involved in youth activism, women's empowerment, and good governance.

== Early life and education ==
Bhattarai was born on 4 September 1998 in Itahari, Sunsari District, Koshi Province, Nepal. She is the daughter of Dhruba Bhattarai and Saraswati Karki. Her mother is a government school teacher.

She attended Janata Bahumukhi Campus, where she earned a Bachelor of Arts (BA) in Socialism and Journalism. She later completed a Master's degree in Rural Development (MRD) at Degree Campus, located in Biratnagar.

== Political career ==
Bhattarai joined the Rastriya Swatantra Party in 2025 after the 2025 Nepalese Gen Z protests. She was nominated as a proportional representative member of parliament from the Rastriya Swatantra Party in the 2026 Nepalese general election. She is now a member of the Infrastructure Development parliamentary committee for the Rastriya Swatantra Party in the Pratinidhi Sabha since April 2026.

== Controversy ==
A video clip of Bhattarai had gone viral, showing her with half of her body outside the window of a moving car. This action had sparked significant criticism regarding road safety on social media platforms. Later, she clarified that the video was shot way back and she will not repeat such act in future.
