= Sisabanibadahara =

Sisabanibadahara सिसबनी वडहरा
- Village development committee
- Location in Nepal
- Coordinates: 26.60°N 87.31°E
- Country: Nepal
- Zone: Kosi Zone
- District: Morang District

Population (1991)
  - Total: 3,978
- Time zone: UTC+5:45 (Nepal Time)

Sisabanibadahara is a village development committee in Morang District in the Koshi Zone of south-eastern Nepal. At the time of the 1991 Nepal census, it had a population of 3978 people living in 733 individual households.

Villages on Sisabanibadahara are Sukchar, Kaderuwa, Sisabani, Badahara, Koyalpur, etc
