= Sorabhaj =

Coordinates: 26°27′N 87°26′E

Sorabhag सोराभाग
- Village development committee
- Interactive map of Sorabhag
- Country: Nepal
- Zone: Kosi Zone
- District: Morang District

Population (1991)
  - Total: 7,865
- Time zone: UTC+5:45 (Nepal Time)

Sorabhag is a village development committee in Morang District in the Kosi Zone of south-eastern Nepal. At the time of the 1991 Nepal census it had a population of 7865 people living in 1605 individual households.

Sorabhag is bordered by the streams Cheka Khola to the east and Gadiya Khola to the west. Karsiya is a market in Sorabhag, located beside Gadiya Khola. The government school Sharada Higher Secondary School is located in Karsiya. The Rangeli road passes through Sorabhag.
