= Kadamaha =

Kadamaha कदमाहा
- Village development committee
- Country: Nepal
- Zone: Kosi Zone
- District: Morang District

Population (1991)
  - Total: 5,182
- Time zone: UTC+5:45 (Nepal Time)

Kadamaha is a village development committee in Morang District in the Kosi Zone of south-eastern Nepal. At the time of the 1991 Nepal census it had a population of 5182 people living in 1029 individual households.
