= Thadiya =

Thadiya ठडिया
- Village
- Location in Nepal
- Coordinates: 26°39′17″N 87°20′20″E
- Country: Nepal
- Zone: Kosi Zone
- District: Morang District

Government
  - Ward President: Bhuvan Singh Nagar
  - Ward Secretary: Shakuntala Parajuli

Population
  - Total: 7,011
- as of 12 June 2018
- Time zone: UTC+5:45 (Nepal Time)

Thadiya is a small village along the Mahendra Highway in eastern Nepal. It is located in middle between Gothgaun and Gachhiya.
