= Tankisinuwari =

Tankisinuwari टंकिसिनवारी Budhiganga ward no. 1/2
- Village development committee
- Location in Nepal
- Coordinates: 26.53°N 87.28°E
- Country: Nepal
- Zone: Kosi Zone
- District: Morang District

Population (1991)
  - Total: 16,481
- Time zone: UTC+5:45 (Nepal Time)

Tankisinuwari is a village development committee in Morang District in the Koshi Zone of south-eastern Nepal. At the time of the 1991 Nepal census it had a population of 16,481.
