= Sukuna Multiple Campus =

Community-based campus affiliation to Tribhuvan University

Coordinates: 26.662585°N 87.388830°E

- सुकुना बहुमुखी क्याम्पस
- Motto: Providing Higher Education to all the promising students with an affordable means and special privileges.
- Type: Community Campus
- Established: 2048 B.S (1992; 34 years ago A.D)
- Affiliations: Tribhuvan University
- Vice-Chancellor: Balaram Pokharel and Ganesh Dahal
- Academic staff: 96
- Administrative staff: 15
- Students: 4500 (Approx.)
- Location: Sundar Haraincha-12, Morang, Nepal
- Language: Nepali, English
- Nickname: SMC
- Website: www.sukuna.edu.np

Sukuna Multiple Campus (SMC; Nepali: सुकुना बहुमुखी क्याम्पस) is a QAA Accredited community-based campus with affiliated to Tribhuvan University. It is situated at Sundar Haraincha Municipality-12, Morang, Nepal. It was established in 2048 B.S (1992 AD).

It offers courses in science, management, humanities, education and arts for bachelor's and master's degrees.

== History ==
It was established in 2048 B.S. (1992 A.D) in Indrapur Village Development Committee, Ward no. 4, Morang, as a community-based public educational institution.

The college took its birth in Sukuna School, Indrapur, ward no.3 by using the school's physical infrastructures, existing manpower of neighboring schools and the colleges. The campus has an area of about 4 bighas of land.

== Department ==
- Department of Science
- Department of Nepali
- Department of English
- Department of Social Studies
- Department of Management
- Research Management Cell (RMC)
- Teaching Practice as a Department
- Department of Health and Population

== Academic programs ==
The following programs are offered in this college.

- Master's Level
  - Master of Business Studies (MBS)
  - Master of Education (M.Ed.)
- Bachelor's Level
  - Bachelor of Science (B.Sc.)
  - Bachelor of Business Administration (BBA)
  - Bachelor of Business Studies (BBS)
  - Bachelor of Education (B.Ed.)
  - Bachelor of Arts (BA)
  - Bachelor in Information Communication Technology (B.Ed. ICT)
  - One Year B.Ed.
- Plus 2 Program
  - Plus Two in Management
  - Plus Two in Education and Arts
  - Plus Two in Humanities

== See also ==
- List of universities and colleges in Nepal
- Secondary Education Examination
