= Necha =

Nocha is a VDC of Dhanpalthan Gaupalika(Rural Municipality)in Morang District, Nepal

Nocha नोचा
- Village development committee
- Location in Nepal
- Coordinates: 26.42°N 87.38°E
- Country: Nepal
- Province: Province No. 1
- District: Morang District

Population (1991)
  - Total: 2,742
- Time zone: UTC+5:45 (Nepal Time)
- Postal code: +977-21
- Area code: +977-21

Nocha is a village development committee in Morang District in Province No. 1 of North-eastern Nepal. At the time of the 1991 Nepal census it had a population of 2742 people living in 549 individual households.
