= Biratchowk =

Biratchowk विराटचोक
- Town
- Location in Province No. 1 Biratchowk (Nepal)
- Coordinates: 26.67°N 87.61°E
- Country: Nepal
- Development Region: Eastern
- Province: Koshi Province
- District: Morang District
- Municipality: Sundar Haraicha Municipality

Government
  - Mayor: Kedar Prasad Guragain (CPN-UML)
  - Deputy Mayor: Akali Chaudhary (CPN-UML)

Area
  - Total: 110 km^{2} (42 sq mi)

Population (2011)
  - Total: 80,518
  - Density: 730/km^{2} (1,900/sq mi)
- Time zone: UTC+5:45 (NST)
- Postal code: 56611
- Area code: 021

Biratchowk (short form: BRC) is a rapidly developing town located in Sundar Haraicha Municipality, Morang District, in the Koshi Province of south-eastern Nepal. Positioned along the Mahendra East–West Highway, Biratchowk acts as the entry point to Biratnagar, the provincial capital and administrative center of Morang.

== Overview ==
Biratchowk is widely considered one of the fastest-growing urban areas in eastern Nepal, experiencing substantial real estate development and commercial expansion. The town is the economic and administrative hub of Sundar Haraicha Municipality.

== Real estate and cost of living ==
Biratchowk has become one of the most expensive areas in eastern Nepal. With high land and housing prices, it has even surpassed Kathmandu in terms of real estate costs, making it a prime location for business and residential investment.

== Demographics and culture ==
The population of Biratchowk is ethnically and culturally diverse, mainly due to an influx of migrants during and after the Nepalese Civil War. People from the hills and neighboring districts have settled here, creating a multicultural environment. The town celebrates various festivals and traditions from across Nepal, making it a vibrant and inclusive community.

== Technology and innovation ==
Biratchowk is also becoming a growing hub for technology. Nepal's first real search engine, Niguro, was founded and is headquartered in Biratchowk. Launched in January 1, 2026, Niriv represents a milestone in the country's tech landscape. Niriv is now rebranded to Niguro and running.

== Media and communication ==
Biratchowk has a growing media presence, with several radio stations such as Radio Suseli and Radio Sarangi serving the local community. The town is also home to multiple digital media ventures.

== Economy ==
The local economy is driven by trade, real estate, transportation, local stalls, and emerging digital services. Biratchowk is also strategically located, acting as a transit point between major eastern cities, with easy access to Biratnagar, Dharan, and Itahari.

== Infrastructure ==
Biratchowk enjoys a relatively advanced infrastructure compared to other towns in the region. It has wide roads, educational institutions, health services, and commercial hubs. The town also has active plans for smart city development under Sundar Haraicha Municipality.

== See also ==
- Sundar Haraicha Municipality
- Morang District
- Koshi Province
