= Islington College =

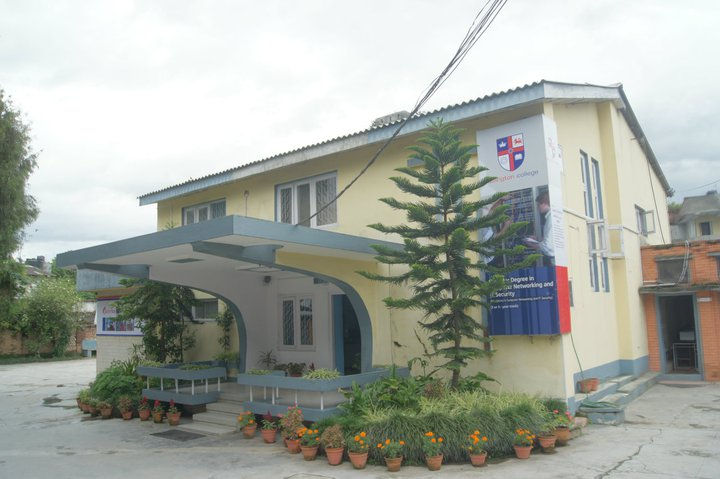
- Administrative block of Islington College
- Established: 1996
- Academic affiliations: London Metropolitan University
- Academic staff: 30+ (academic)
- Students: 1600+
- Location: Kamalpokhari, Kathmandu, Nepal
- Colours: Red, Blue & White
- Website: islington.edu.np

Islington College is an educational institution in Kathmandu, Nepal. It was established in 1996 as a regular franchisee of Singapore main-board listed Informatics Education Limited. The college partners with London Metropolitan University to deliver bachelor's degrees in Computing, Computer Networking & IT Security, and Multimedia Technologies programmes for in-country provision.

The college changed its name from Informatics to Islington College in 2011.

== Courses ==
=== Bachelors ===
- Bachelor in Computing
- Bachelor in Computer Networking & IT Security
- Bachelor in Multimedia Technologies
- Bachelor in Computing and Artificial Intelligence
- BBA with Specialisation in International Business
- BBA with Specialisation in Digital Business Management
- BBA with Specialisation in Advertising & Management
- BBA with Specialisation in Events & Tourism Management
- Bachelor in Accounting & Finance

=== Masters ===
- Master in IT & Applied Security

== See also ==
- Itahari International College
