= Ratuwamai Municipality =

Ratuwamai municipality रतुवामाई नगरपालिका
- Municipality
- Location in Nepal
- Coordinates: 26.48°N 87.63°E
- Country: Nepal
- Province: Koshi Province
- District: Morang District

Government
  - Type: Mayor–council
  - Body: Ratuwamai Municipality City
  - Mayor: Mr. Nageshwar Prasad Singh (NC)
  - Deputy Mayor: Mrs. Damayanta Chudal (NCP)

Area
  - Total: 142.15 km^{2} (54.88 sq mi)

Population (2017)
  - Total: 55,380
  - Density: 389.6/km^{2} (1,009/sq mi)
- Time zone: UTC+5:45 (NST)
- Postal code: 56601
- Area code: 021
- Website: official website

Ratuwamai is a municipality and rural town situated in south-eastern Tarai in Morang district and Koshi Province of Nepal. This municipality was formed merging six village development committee i.e. Sijuwa, Itahara, Jhurkiya, Mahadeva, Govindapur (Ward No. 1, 3, 4 and 7) and Baradanga (Ward No. 1, 4, 5 and 7) since March 2017. Total population is 55 thousand 3 hundred 80, area 142.15 km^{2} and the number of voters is 42 thousand 4 hundred. The main Occupation of this municipality is the Agriculture, most of the people earn money by farming. Sombare, Itahara, Laxmichock, Damravitta, Sijuwa, Sauntha, Shanichare, Govindapur, Kalyanpur and Jhurkiya, Mahadewa, Mirchadangi, chhalgachi, Pidhali are the most developing places in the Municipality. The borders are as following: East Jhapa District, West Sunawarshi Municipality and Pathari-Sanischare Municipality, North Urlabari Municipality and South Bihar State India.

== Demographics ==
At the time of the 2011 Nepal census, Ratuwamai Municipality had a population of 55,418. Of these, 40.8% spoke Nepali, 19.6% Maithili, 9.8% Rajbanshi, 8.4% Tajpuriya, 6.6% Urdu, 4.5% Santali, 1.8% Limbu, 1.4% Ganagai, 1.0% Newar, 1.0% Rai, 0.9% Bengali, 0.9% Tamang, 0.8% Tharu, 0.5% Magar, 0.2% Bhojpuri, 0.2% Dhimal, 0.2% Hindi, 0.2% Majhi, 0.1% Bantawa, 0.1% Gurung, 0.1% Sampang, 0.1% Sunuwar, 0.1% Yakkha and 0.3% other languages as their first language.

In terms of ethnicity/caste, 15.9% were Hill Brahmin, 15.2% Chhetri, 8.5% Tajpuriya, 7.8% Musalman, 6.0% Gangai, 4.6% Rajbanshi, 4.6% Satar/Santal, 2.4% Newar, 2.2% Limbu, 2.2% Musahar, 2.0% Teli, 1.9% Sanyasi/Dasnami, 1.7% Rai, 1.6% other Terai, 1.6% Yadav, 1.5% Damai/Dholi, 1.5% Majhi, 1.2% Tamang, 1.1% Amat, 1.0% Kami, 1.0% (Kewrat 1.0%) Tatma/Tatwa, 0.9% Mallaha, 0.9% Tharu, 0.8% Badhaee, 0.8% Hajam/Thakur, 0.8% Magar, 0.8% Nuniya, 0.6% Sudhi, 0.5% Baraee, 0.5% Dhanuk, 0.5% Halwai, 0.5% Sarki, 0.4% Chamar/Harijan/Ram, 0.4% Dusadh/Paswan/Pasi, 0.4% Gharti/Bhujel, 0.3% Bantar/Sardar, 0.3% Brahmu/Baramo, 0.3% Gurung, 0.3% Koiri/Kushwaha, 0.3% Kumal, 0.3% Sonar, 0.2% Dhimal, 0.2% Kathabaniyan, 0.2% Kayastha, 0.2% Lohar, 0.1% Bengali, 0.1% Bin, 0.1% Terai Brahmin, 0.1% other Dalit, 0.1% Danuwar, 0.1% Gaderi/Bhedihar, 0.1% other Janajati, 0.1% Kahar, 0.1% Kalwar, 0.1% Kamar, 0.1% Khawas, 0.1% Kumhar, 0.1% Kurmi, 0.1% Rajput, 0.1% Sunuwar, 0.1% Thakuri, 0.1% Yakkha and 0.5% others.

In terms of religion, 83.0% were Hindu, 7.8% Muslim, 3.9% Prakriti, 2.8% Kirati, 1.7% Buddhist, 0.7% Christian and 0.2% others.

In terms of literacy, 64.8% could read and write, 2.3% could only read and 32.9% could neither read nor write.

== Education ==
Shree Sauntha Higher Secondary School located in Ratuwamai -6, Sauntha is currently regarded as the best public school which provides education in english as well as nepali medium. Likewise Saraswati Higher Secondary School is one of the biggest schools in the municipality.It is Located In Ratuwamai-8 Itahara, Morang.

Pathibhara English School is an English medium school located in Ratuwamai municipality-7 Sijuwa, Morang. Shree MAA.VI Kendra No:-02, Located in Ratuwamai Municipality-3 Mahadewa, Morang.

Rising Nepal Secondary Boarding School is a school located in Ward No. 6. Similarly, there are many public and private schools all around the municipality which helps to procide quality education to the students.
