= JoBike =

Bangladeshi bicycle sharing system

Jobike

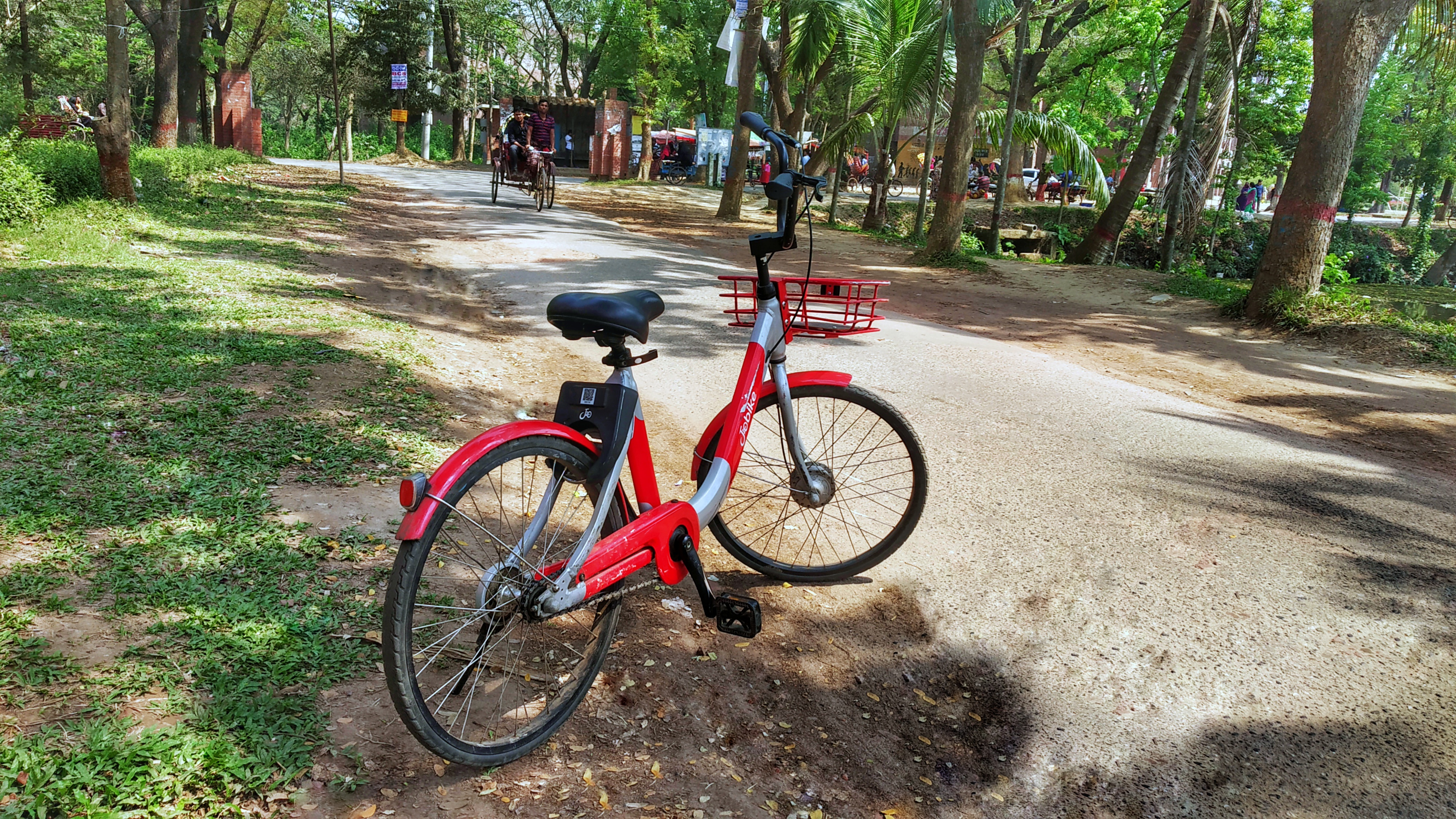

Overview
- Locale: Dhaka, Chittagong, Cox's Bazar
- Transit type: Bicycle-sharing system
- Number of stations: 5 (March 2019)
- Website: www.jo.bike

Operation
- Began operation: June 18, 2018; 8 years ago
- Number of vehicles: 300 (March 2019)

Jobike is a bicycle sharing system serving the cities of Dhaka, Chittagong and Cox's Bazar. Launched in 2018, it is the first such system in Bangladesh. Currently, there are 300 Jobike bicycles and 5 stations throughout these city, including some university like University of Dhaka, Jahangirnagar University, University of Chittagong, and Shahjalal University of Science and Technology, as well as suburban places like Cox's Bazar.

== History ==
It was founded by Mehedi Reza on June 18, 2018. The journey of this service started by opening its bicycle station in tourism city Cox's Bazar. Initially, this service only could be taken from Cox's Bazar's Calatoli, Sugandha and Labani Point. Later it started their operations at Jahangirnagar University. In continuation of this, it is currently operating its activities in Chittagong University, Shahjalal University of Science and Technology and Dhaka city.

== Operating system ==
Customer first need to download the mobile application to avail the service. Then open the account and launch the app. There they can find out where to get bicycles. Users can install the Jobike app on their smart phones and access the service via Jo-Credit Balance. To rent a bicycle from JoBike, After entering payment information a QR code will be provided which is printed on the bicycle, which needs to be scanned to unlock the bikes from the dock.
