= Minendra Rijal =

Nepali politician

Honourable Minendra Rijal
- मिनेन्द्र रिजाल

Defence Minister of Nepal
- In office 8 October 2021 – 16 December 2021
- President: Bidhya Devi Bhandari
- Prime Minister: Sher Bahadur Deuba
- Preceded by: Ishwor Pokhrel
- Succeeded by: Sher Bahadur Deuba

Member of the House of Representatives
- In office 4 March 2018 – 18 September 2022
- Preceded by: Chandi Prasad Rai
- Succeeded by: Rishikesh Pokharel
- Constituency: Morang 2

Member of the Legislature Parliament
- In office 21 January 2014 – 14 October 2017
- PR group: Khas Arya
- Constituency: Nepali Congress PR list

Minister of Information and Communications
- In office 25 February 2014 – 12 October 2015
- President: Ram Baran Yadav
- Prime Minister: Sushil Koirala
- Succeeded by: Sher Dhan Rai

Minister for Constituent Assembly, Parliamentary Affairs and Culture
- In office 25 May 2009 – 6 February 2011
- President: Ram Baran Yadav
- Prime Minister: Madhav Kumar Nepal

Personal details
- Born: 16 October 1957 (age 68) Dharan, Sunsari
- Party: Nepali Congress
- Spouse: Durga Rijal
- Education: New York University (PhD), (Mphil); University at Buffalo (MBA); Tribhuvan University (B.Sc, LL.B., MBM)

Dr. Minendra Rijal (Nepali: मिनेन्द्र रिजाल) is a Nepali politician, former defence minister of Nepal, and former member of the House of Representatives.

== Political career ==
Rijal is a former member of Nepali Congress party Central Working Committee. He served as Minister of Information and Communications during the prime minister-ship of the Sushil Koirala.

Rijal resigned as defence minister after he was unable to win the internal election of the party for general secretary.

He was elected to parliament from Morang-2 in the 2017 elections. Morang-2 is the constituency from where the late PM Girija Prasad Koirala used to contest the election.

Rijal was also one of the architects of the mixed electoral system that ensured better social and gender diversity in the Constituent Assembly.

== Electoral history ==
=== 2026 general election - Morang 2 ===
Candidate	Party	Votes	%
Krishna Kumar Karki	RSP	40,924	54.72
Dilip Kumar Bagediya	CPN (UML)	15,624	20.89
Minendra Rijal	Congress	12,764	17.07
Abuho Rairaha	SSP	1,822	2.44
Chandrabir Rai	NCP	1,366	1.83
Others		2,286	3.06
Total		74,786	100.00
Registered voters/turnout			–
Majority		25,300	
RSP gain			

=== 2017 legislative elections ===
Morang 2
Party	Candidate	Votes
Nepali Congress	Minendra Prasad Rijal	35,819
CPN (Unified Marxist–Leninist)	Rishikesh Pokharel	34,014
Federal Socialist Forum, Nepal	Yuvraj Karki	2,595
Rastriya Janata Party Nepal	Mahendra Lal Das Kevrat	2,082
Others		1,279
Invalid votes		4,460
Result	Congress gain	
Source: Election Commission
