= Rangeli Municipality =

Rangeli रङ्गेली
- Municipality
- Location in Nepal
- Coordinates: 26.46°N 87.49°E
- Country: Nepal
- Zone: Koshi Zone
- District: Morang District

Government
  - Type: local government
  - Mayor: vacant
  - Deputy Mayor: Bhuma Parajuli (NCP)

Population (1991)
  - Total: 12,325
- Time zone: UTC+5:45 (NST)
- Postal code: 56602
- Area code: 021
- Website: official website

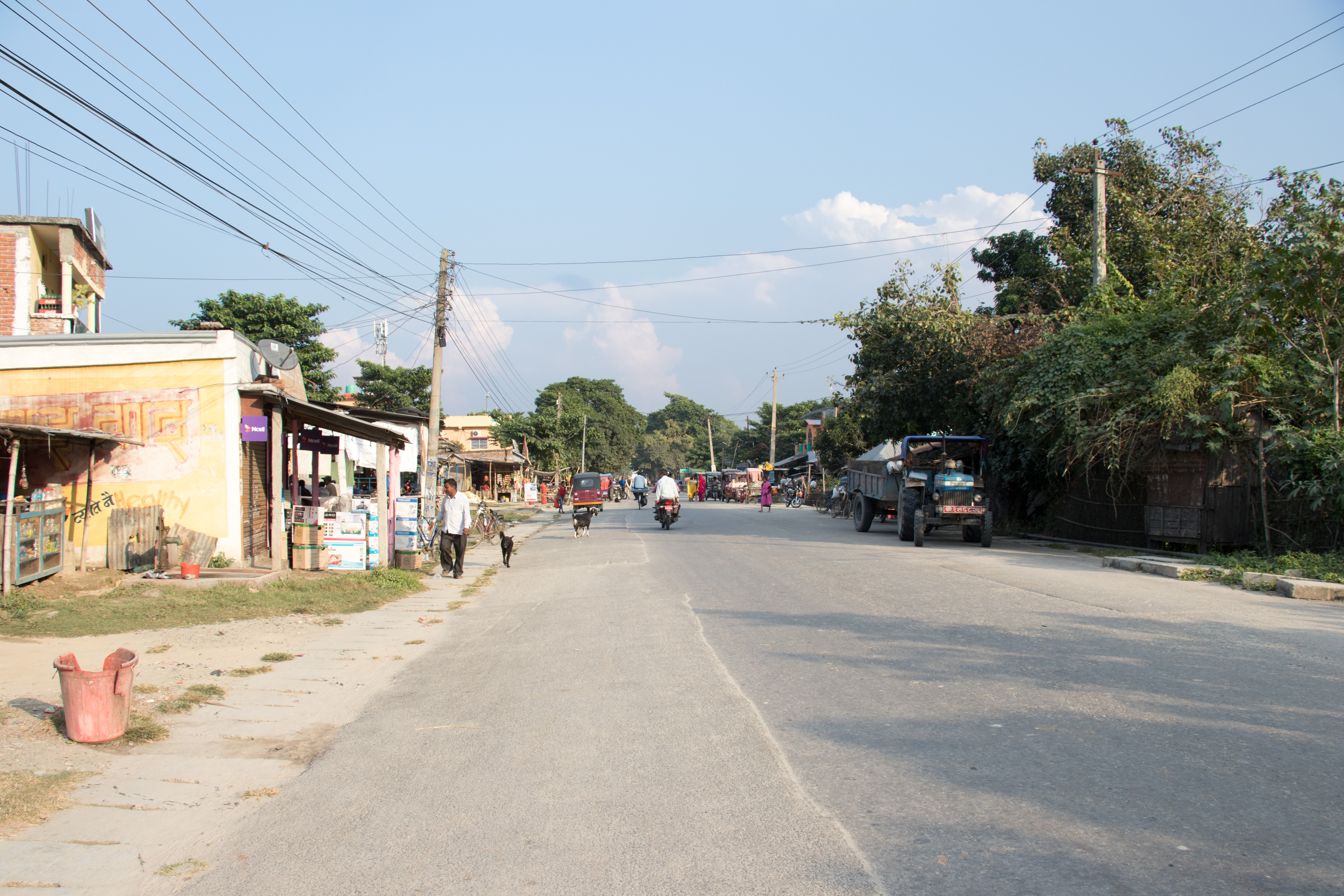
Rangeli Municipality

Rangeli is a Municipality and rural market town in Morang District in the Koshi Zone of south-eastern Nepal. This municipality was formed merging existing four villages i.e.Amgachhi, Babiabirta, Darbesa and Rangeli itself since May 2014.

At the time of the 1991 Nepal census it had a population of 12,325 people living in 2463 individual households.

It is in the centre of a fertile agricultural region and there are numerous factories surrounding the town such as brick kilns and rice mills. Rangeli is linked by regular buses to the industrial city of Biratnagar.

Rangeli was once the district headquarters of Morang district, and was in the past a historically important trading town, although its role has declined over the last half a century with the growth of Biratnagar. Nevertheless, it remains an important market centre serving south-eastern Morang district.

The first recorded settlement in the region dates back to 7th century, when King Mung Mawrong Hang came to prominence in the historical terai lands of Limbuwan (present-day Sunsari, Morang and Jhapa area). He cleared much of the forest area in present-day Rangeli, east of Biratnagar, and built a town there. He named his Kingdom Morang after his name and rose to power.

== Wards ==
There are 9 wards in Rangeli, made up from wards of the former village development committees as follows:

| New ward | Included VDC / Municipality | Population | Area (sq. Km.) |
|---|---|---|---|
| 1 | Babiyabirta (1¸2¸5-9) | 6930 | 17.3 |
| 2 | Babiyabirta (3¸4) | 7696 | 22.12 |
| 3 | Darvesha (4¸7¸9) | 5192 | 17.14 |
| 4 | Rangeli (3) | 3368 | 7.48 |
| 5 | Rangeli (6-8) | 5203 | 11.14 |
| 6 | Rangeli (2¸4) | 5110 | 6.56 |
| 7 | Rangeli (1¸5) | 7054 | 3.38 |
| 8 | Darvesha (1-3) | 5122 | 10.38 |
| 9 | Darvesha (5¸6¸8) | 6338 | 16.28 |
