= Itahari =

Itahari ईटहरी
- Sub-metropolitan city
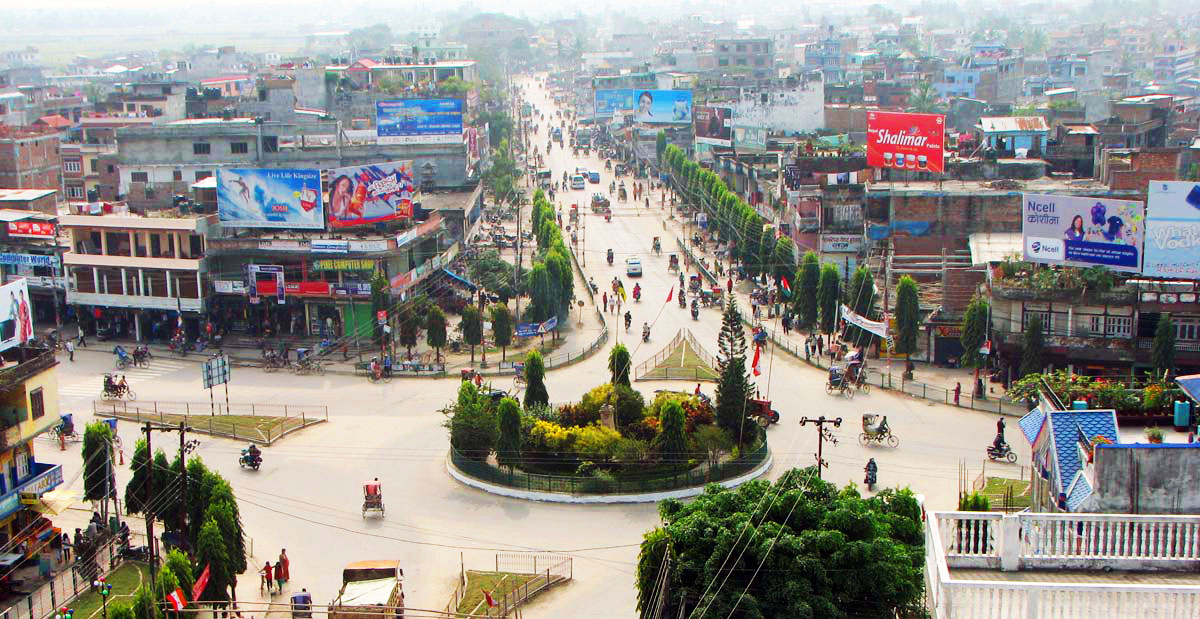
- Motto(s): "Clean, Green and Commercial City".
- Interactive map of Itahari
- Location of Itahari in Koshi Province Itahari (Nepal)
- Coordinates: 26°39′47″N 87°16′28″E
- Country: Nepal
- Province: Koshi
- District: Sunsari
- Wards: 20
- Settled: -

Government
  - Type: Mayor-council
  - Mayor: Hem Karna Paudel (Congress)
  - Deputy Mayor: Sangita Kumari Chaudhary (CPN-UML)

Area
  - Total: 36.21 sq mi (93.78 km^{2})
- Elevation: 360 ft (110 m)

Population (2021)
  - Total: 198,098
  - Rank: 9th (Nepal); 2nd (Province No. 1)
  - Density: 5,471/sq mi (2,112/km^{2})
  - Ethnicities: Bahun Chhetri Tamang Limbu Rai Tharu Magars Newars

Languages
  - Official: Nepali
- Time zone: UTC+5:45 (NST)
- Postal Code: 56705
- Area code: 025
- Climate: Cwa
- Website: itaharimun.gov.np

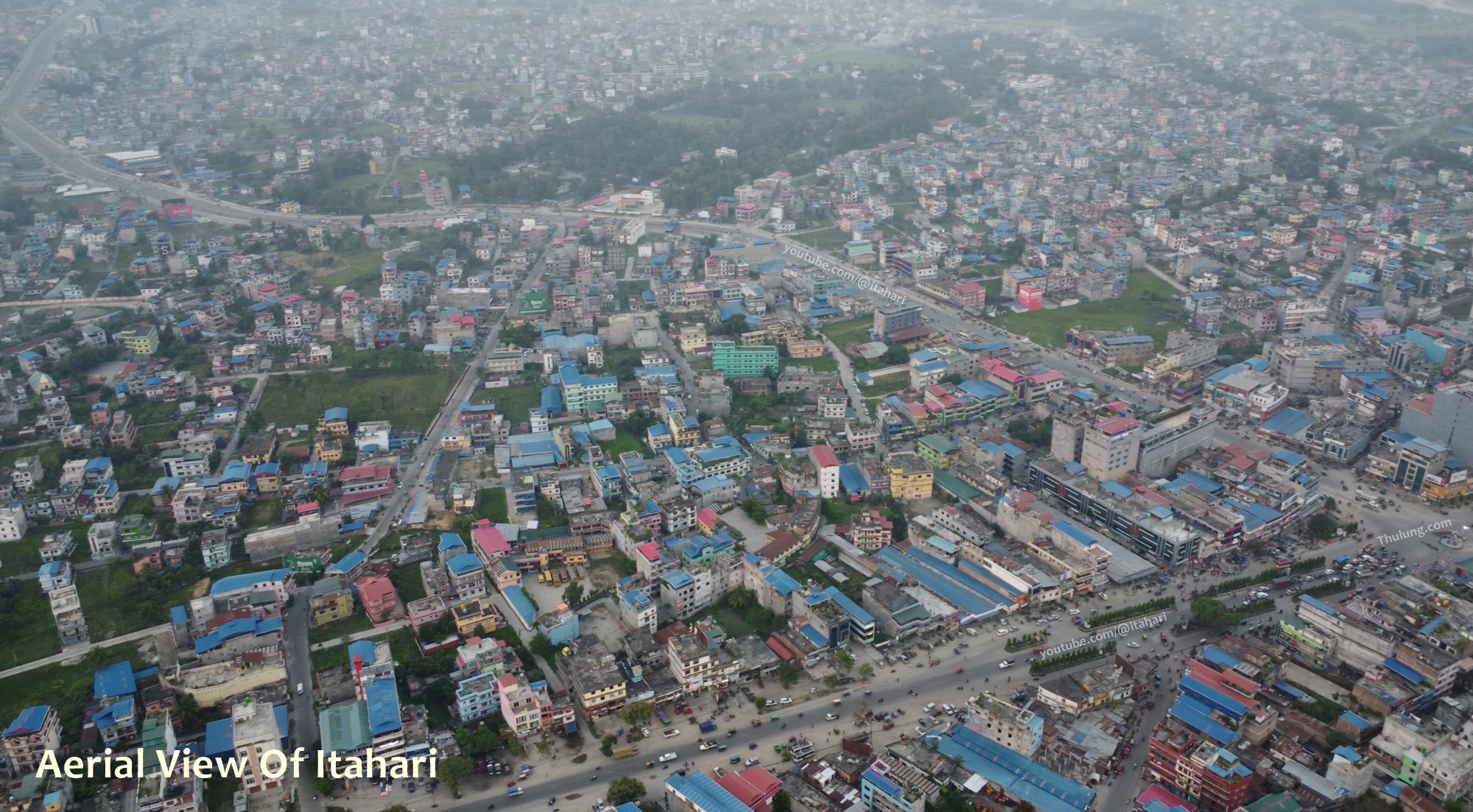
Aerial view of Itahari

Itahari (Nepali: ईटहरी) is a sub-metropolitan city in the Sunsari District of Koshi Province in Nepal. Itahari city has grown as an important business hub of eastern Nepal. It is the second most populous city in eastern Nepal after Biratnagar. Situated 25 kilometres north of the provincial capital of Biratnagar, 16 kilometres south of Dharan and 92 kilometres west of Kakarbhitta, Itahari serves as a junction point of the east-west Mahendra Highway and the north–south Koshi Highway. Itahari has an estimated city population of 200,000 living in 40,207 households as per 2021 Nepal census. It is one of the fastest-growing cities in Eastern Nepal. It is one of the cities of the Greater Birat Development Area, which incorporates the cities of Biratnagar-Itahari-Gothgau-Biratchowk-Dharan, primarily located on the Koshi Highway in Eastern Nepal, with an estimated total urban agglomerated population of 804,300 people living in 159,332 households.

According to the Ministry of Federal Affairs and Local Development, Itahari has an area of 93.78 square kilometres (36.21 mi^{2}) with 140,517 people living in 33,794 individual households as of Census of Nepal 2011. The town is divided into a total of 20 wards. The municipality was established in 1997 and became a sub-metro in 2014.

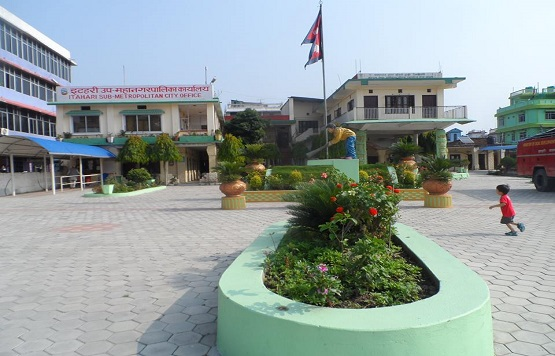
Itahari Sub-Metropolitan city office

== Climate ==
In the winter season, the temperature of Itahari is 10–18 °C, it increases to 30–45 °C during the summer season. About 2007 mm of precipitation falls annually. There is 4 mm of precipitation in December. In July, the precipitation reaches its peak, with an average of 571 mm.

Climate data for Itahari (Tarahara) (1991–2020 normals)
Month	Jan	Feb	Mar	Apr	May	Jun	Jul	Aug	Sep	Oct	Nov	Dec	Year
Mean daily maximum °C (°F)	22.7 (72.9)	25.7 (78.3)	30.9 (87.6)	33.2 (91.8)	33.3 (91.9)	32.8 (91.0)	32.2 (90.0)	32.4 (90.3)	32.2 (90.0)	31.4 (88.5)	28.9 (84.0)	25.3 (77.5)	30.1 (86.1)
Daily mean °C (°F)	15.6 (60.1)	18.1 (64.6)	23.3 (73.9)	26.1 (79.0)	28.3 (82.9)	28.8 (83.8)	28.8 (83.8)	28.9 (84.0)	28.2 (82.8)	26.1 (79.0)	21.7 (71.1)	17.8 (64.0)	24.3 (75.8)
Mean daily minimum °C (°F)	8.5 (47.3)	10.5 (50.9)	15.6 (60.1)	18.9 (66.0)	23.3 (73.9)	24.8 (76.6)	25.4 (77.7)	25.4 (77.7)	24.2 (75.6)	20.7 (69.3)	14.5 (58.1)	10.3 (50.5)	18.5 (65.3)
Average precipitation mm (inches)	16.5 (0.65)	13.2 (0.52)	20.7 (0.81)	69.6 (2.74)	174.5 (6.87)	295.1 (11.62)	538.2 (21.19)	376.0 (14.80)	294.9 (11.61)	93.8 (3.69)	14.1 (0.56)	13.0 (0.51)	1,919.6 (75.57)
Source 1: Department of Hydrology and Meteorology
Source 2: Agricultural Extension in South Asia (precipitation 1976–2005)

== Education ==
- Itahari International College
- SOS Hermann Gmeiner Higher Secondary School

== Demographics ==
Religion in Itahari (2011)
Religion	Percent
Hinduism	60%
Kirat	15%
Christian	8%
Buddhism	7%
Islam	3%
Others	7%

=== Languages ===
language in Itahari
1. Nepali (56.7%)
2. Tharu (16.3%)
3. Maithili (8.70%)
4. Rai (2.00%)
5. Limbu (2.40%)
6. Tamang (2.10%)
7. Others (11.8%)

At the time of the 2021 Census of Nepal, 56.7% of the population in the City spoke Nepali, 16.3% Tharu, 8.7% Maithili, 2% Rai, 2.4% Limbu Language, 2.1% Tamang, and 11.8% spoke other languages as their first language.

=== Ethnic groups ===
Ethnic groups in Itahari
1. Chhetri (20.8%)
2. Hill Brahman (16.9%)
3. Tharu (15.9%)
4. Rai (7.90%)
5. Limbu (3.40%)
6. Newar (4.50%)
7. Others (30.6%)

The largest ethnic group is Chhetri, who make up 20.8% of the population, Hill Brahman and Tharu comes to second and third with 16.9% and 15.9% each respectively. Other groups in Itahari include Rai (7.9%), Limbu (3.4%), Newar (4.5%) and other various ethnic groups (30.6%).

== Local level elections ==
Name list
Party	Mayor/chairperson	Deputy mayor/chairperson	Results
Nepali Congress	Hem Karna Poudel	-	
CPN (Unified Marxist–Leninist)	Yam Kumar Chungwang Limbu	Sangita Kumari Chaudhari	
Communist Party of Nepal (Maoist Centre)	-	-	
Communist Party of Nepal (Unified Socialist)	-	Keshav Kumar Bista	
Rastriya Prajatantra Party	Akash Hang Limbu	Babita Kumari Chaudhari	
CPN Maoist Socialist	Bhanu Bhakta Koirala	-	
Janata Samajwadi Party	Dilli Prasad Limbu	Yamuna Guragain	
Khambuwan Rastriya Morcha Nepal	Desh Maya Rai	-	
Maulik Jarokilo Party	Rameswar Thapa	Sharmila Baral	
Sanghiya Loktantrik Rastriya Manch	Bhim Kumar Limbu	Dilita Limbu	
Nagarik Unmukti Party	Akshay Kumar Chaudhari	-	
Mangol National Organization	Dipendra Rai	-	
Loktantrit Samajwadi Party	Ganga Bahadur Shrestha	-	
Independents	Jhamak Bahadur Karki	-	
Independents	Dilli Ram Dahal	-	
Independents	Padam Kumar Adhikari	-	
Independents	Tek Raj Bhujel	-	
Independents	-	Anju Kumari Singh	

== Notable people ==
- Ritesh Thapa, national-level football player
- Shristi Bhattarai, politician and member of parliament
