= Urlabari Municipality =

Urlabari उर्लाबारी
- Municipality
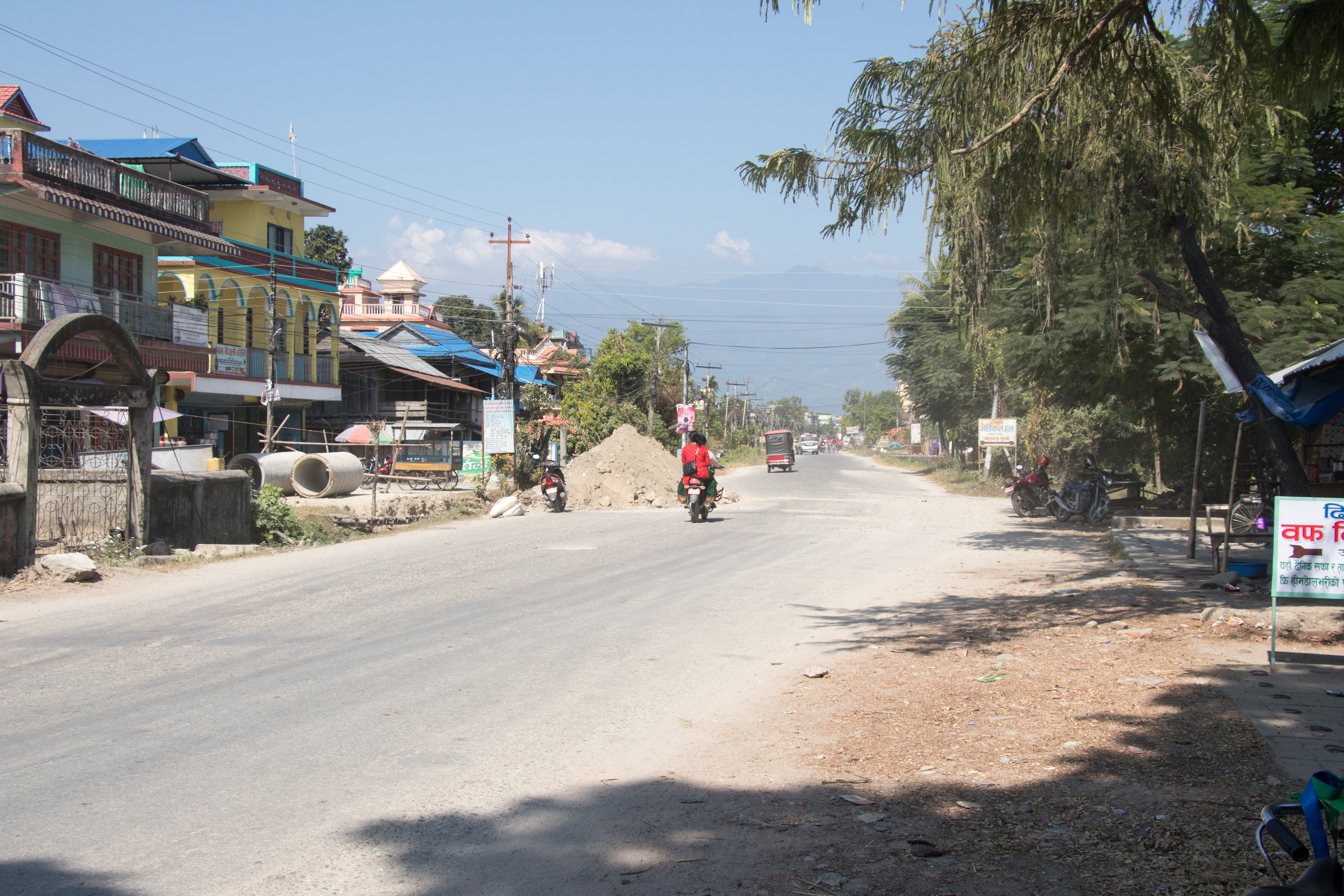
- Urlabari

- Location in Nepal
- Coordinates: 26.67°N 87.61°E
- Country: Nepal
- Zone: Koshi
- District: Morang

Government
  - Mayor: Ganga Prasad Kharel (CPN-UML)
  - Deputy Mayor: Mina Khatiwada Paudel (CPN-UML)

Population (2021)
  - Total: 70,908
- Time zone: UTC+5:45 (NST)
- Postal code: 56604
- Area code: 021
- Website: www.urlabarimun.gov.np

Urlabari is a town and municipality in Morang District in the Koshi Province of south-eastern Nepal. It is considered to be the second largest city in Morang District after Biratnagar. At the time of the 1991 Nepal census it had a population of 18,224. At the time of the 2011 Nepal census it had a population of 35,166 and 8,165 households. The ethnicity and caste pattern of the municipality shows diversity with major ethnic groups such as Brahman, Chhetri, Limbu, Maithili, Tharu, Rajbanshi and many more.

It is located 60 km eastern part of the metropolitan city of Biratnagar. Urlabari, Morang. Damak, which is in Jhapa lies to the east of this municipality. Madhumalla and Durgapuri, both belonging to Morang District lie to the North and South respectively. Pathari which belongs to Sunsari District is in the west. From 2011 census the total population is 54,696. where 29,548 are the woman and 25,148 are men lived with 12,530 households. The population of the municipality rose to 70,908 at the 2021 Nepal census. 99.6% of the residents were Nepali citizens and 84.8% were literate in 2021.

Urlabari Municipality has 1 Government Hospital, 1 Health Checkpoint and 6 Private Health posts. It is also rich in natural vegetation and has community forests such as Srijana community forest, Sunjhoda community forest, Salbari community forest and Beteni community forest. Betana Wetland Area is one of the most visited tourist attraction in Urlabari. It also has 6 Child Development Center. There are fair number of government education institutes, including Urlabari Bahumukhi Campus, Radhika Higher Secondary School, Sunpakkwa Higher Secondary, Radhika Secondary School, Srijana Secondary School, Durga Secondary School, Sunjhoda Higher Secondary School. Some of the most recognisable private schools are Pashupati Higher Secondary school, Morang Model School, Bhrikuti Model Academy and Shishu Shiksha Sadan English School. There are more than 20 privately held secondary schools and higher secondary schools.

Urlabari is a progressive municipality and has potential to rise as one of the most prominent cities in Nepal. Urlabari Municipality is the only municipality in Morang district to achieve a score of 85.5 in the Local Government Institutional Capacity Self-Assessment (LISA). Likewise, it has been successful to be the municipality with good governance in Koshi Province by scoring 84.4 in the Local Government Fiduciary Risk Assessment (FRA)

As of 2024, a 5.5-kilometre road is being blacktopped in Ward no. 2 with financial assistance from the World Bank. Rural Reconstruction Nepal (RRN) has agreed to provide a project worth Rs. 270 million. Additionally, six kilometres of the embankment have been constructed with the support of the World Bank under the Ratuwa Mawa Embankment Project and Koshi Bakraha Embankment Project.

A Rs. 600 million project for six municipalities has been approved for the reduction of women's violence. Urlabari is the only municipality in Morang to be included in that project. Additionally, large projects are being implemented in the municipality not only from local resources, the federal and provincial governments but also with the support of donor organisations.
