= Morang District =

District in eastern Nepal

Coordinates: 26°40′N 87°30′E

Morang District मोरङ जिल्ला
- District
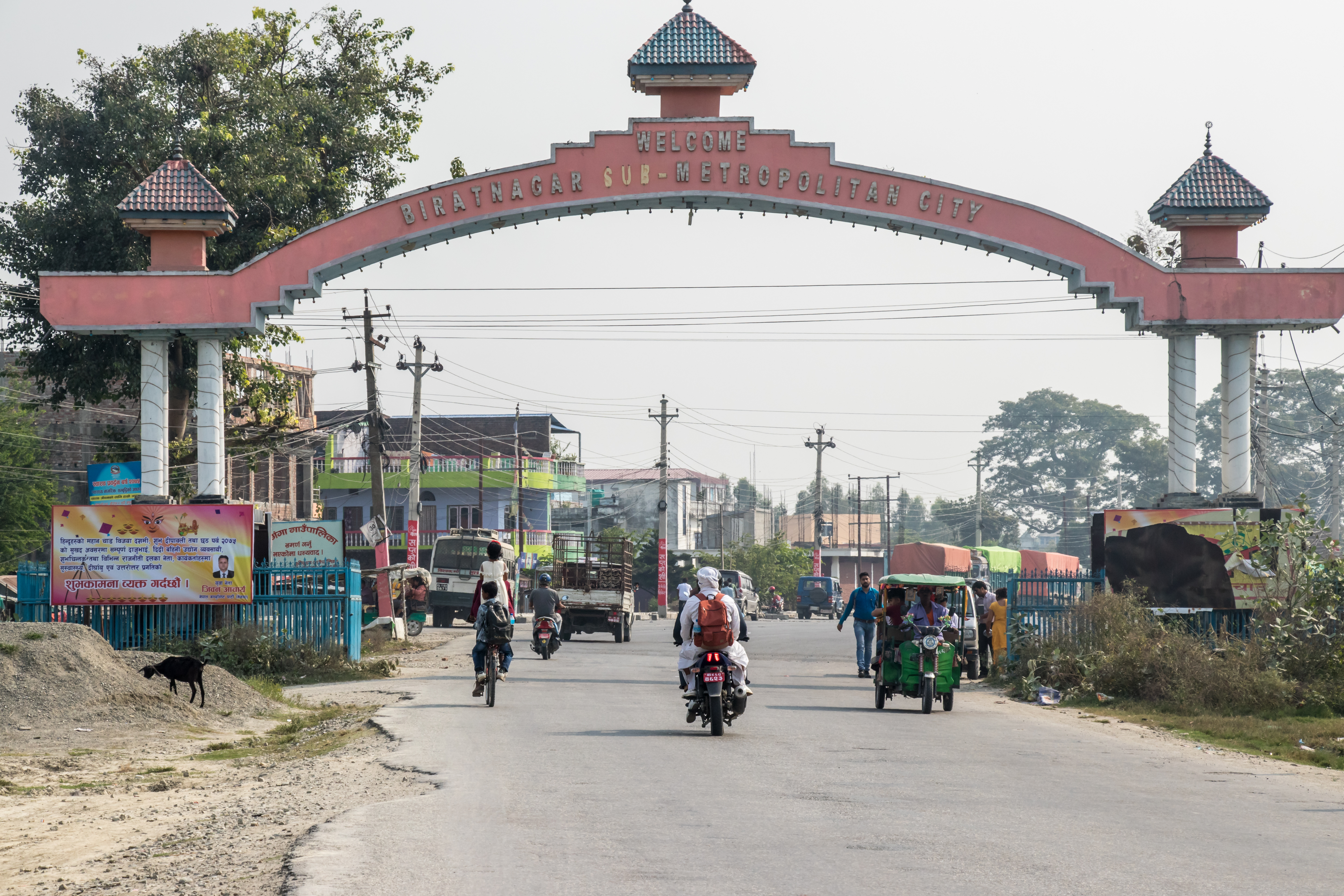
- Entrance to Biratnagar

- Country: Nepal
- Province: Koshi Province
- Established: 7th century circa
- Admin HQ.: Biratnagar

Government
  - Type: Coordination committee
  - Body: DCC, Morang
  - Head: Mr. Naresh Prasad Pokhrel
  - Deputy-Head: Mr. Prakash Kumar Shah
  - Parliamentary constituencies: 6
  - Provincial constituencies: 12

Area
  - Total: 1,855 km^{2} (716 sq mi)
- Elevation: 111 m (364 ft)
- Highest elevation: 2,410 m (7,910 ft)
- Lowest elevation: 60 m (200 ft)

Population (2021)
  - Total: 1,147,187
  - Rank: 1st (in Province)
  - Density: 618.4/km^{2} (1,602/sq mi)
- Time zone: UTC+05:45 (NPT)
- Main Language(s): Nepali, Maithili, Tharu, Rajbanshi, Limbu
- Minor Language(s): Newar, Angika, Urdu, Magar, Tamang
- Website: www.ddcmorang.gov.np

== Geography and climate ==
Climate Zone	Elevation Range	% of Area
Lower Tropical	below 300 meters (1,000 ft)	80.9%
Upper Tropical	300 to 1,000 meters 1,000 to 3,300 ft.	11.5%
Subtropical	1,000 to 2,000 meters 3,300 to 6,600 ft.	7.4%
Temperate	2,000 to 3,000 meters 6,400 to 9,800 ft.	0.2%

Morang District lies in the Outer Terai, or plains, of eastern Nepal. Most of the land is taken up by rice and jute cultivation, though areas of sal forest remain along the northern part of the district where the plains meet the hills.

== Demographics ==
Historical population
Year	Pop.	±% p.a.
1981	534,692	—
1991	674,823	+2.35%
2001	843,220	+2.25%
2011	965,370	+1.36%
2021	1,147,186	+1.74%

At the time of the 2021 Nepal census, Morang District had a population of 1,147,186. 7.63% of the population is under 5 years of age. It has a literacy rate of 78.61% and a sex ratio of 1059 females per 1000 males. 802,089 (69.92%) lived in municipalities.

Ethnicity/caste of Morang district (2021)
1. Chhetri (13.2%)
2. Bahun (12.3%)
3. Tharu (5.78%)
4. Muslim (4.85%)
5. Rai (4.54%)
6. Limbu (4.22%)
7. Rajbanshi (3.76%)
8. Newar (3.19%)
9. Musahar (3.09%)
10. Gangai (2.65%)
11. Tamang (2.61%)
12. Magar (2.50%)
13. Bantar (2.29%)
14. Yadav (2.22%)
15. Kami (2.21%)
16. Other Madheshi non-Dalit (14.4%)
17. Other Terai Janjati (6.51%)
18. Other Hill Janjati (3.45%)
19. Other Madheshi Dalit (2.02%)
20. Other Khas Dalit (1.98%)
21. Others (2.32%)

Morang is the most ethnically diverse district in Nepal, with 119 castes and ethnicities represented. Khas people make up the largest group, mainly Chhetri and Bahun who together make up over 25% of the population. Khas Dalits are around 4% of the population. Madheshi communities made up nearly 24% of the population, with 17% being non-Dalits and 7% Dalits. Terai Janjati communities make up nearly 19% of the population, mainly Tharu, Rajbanshi, Gangai and Dhimal. Hill Janajati communities make up 17% of the population, mainly Kiranti peoples like Rais and Limbus as well as Tamang and Magar. Muslims are nearly 5% of the population, divided into a number of castes.

Religion in Morang District (2021)
Religion	Percent
Hinduism	81.47%
Kirat Mundhum	6.64%
Islam	4.94%
Buddhism	4.06%
Christianity	1.97%
Prakriti	0.80%
Other or not stated	0.02%

Religion: 80.3% were Hindu, 6.5% Kirati, 4.7% Muslim, 4.1% Buddhist, 2.3% Prakriti, 1.6% Christian, 0.1% Jain and 0.3% others.

Languages of Morang district (2021)
1. Nepali (40.0%)
2. Maithili (22.6%)
3. Tharu (6.60%)
4. Rajbanshi (3.60%)
5. Limbu (3.20%)
6. Angika (3.20%)
7. Urdu (2.80%)
8. Santali (1.80%)
9. Tamang (1.80%)
10. other (14.4%)

At the time of the 2021 census, 39.99% of the population spoke Nepali, 22.64% Maithili, 6.62% Tharu, 3.57% Rajbanshi, 3.20% Limbu, 3.12% Angika, 2.76% Urdu, 1.84% Santali, 1.77% Tamang, 1.59% Magar, 1.39% Rai, 1.00% Dhimal, 0.99% Newari and 0.93% Bantawa as their first language.

== Economy ==
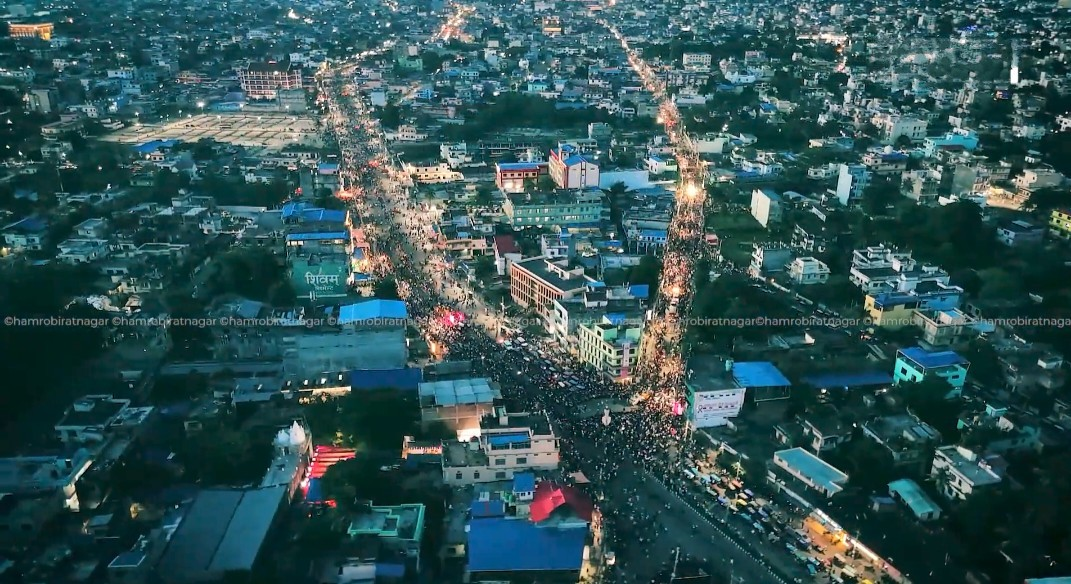
Biratnagar Skyline

Most of the district is rural, though it is also home to Biratnagar, the sixth largest city of Nepal. It is the industrial capital of Nepal. Morang has the highest numbers of industries and factories, multinational brands. Other emerging towns include Sundarharaicha, Urlabari, Belbari, Pathari and Rangeli. It has the largest industrial area in the whole country, expanding from Rani Mills Area to Duhabi River. Biratnagar Jute Mills, Arihant and Dhanawat Matches are among the nation's oldest industries.

== Education ==
Morang district is home to the historic Morang Campus (Mahendra Morang Adarsh Multiple Campus, Biratnagar), Sukuna Multiple Campus (Sundar Haraicha Municipality), Urlabari Multiple Campus, Pathari Multiple Campus, and several other institutions of higher learning. Sukuna Multiple Campus has around 5000 students situated at Sunderharaincha of Morang district. Purbanchal University in Biratnagar offers graduate level courses in many disciplines of Science, Arts and Liberal Sciences. At present, the university has broadly identified Industry-Technology, Agriculture-Forestry, Environment- Rural-Cultural Subsistence and Sustainable Development as specific areas of “Academic Excellence”. It has affiliated private in all the parts of Nepal.

== Politics ==
Morang has been a hotbed of political activity throughout Nepal's recent history producing political stalwarts such as Matrika Prasad Koirala, BP Koirala, Madan Bhandari, Girija Prasad Koirala, Man Mohan Adhikari, Sushil Koirala, Bharat Mohan Adhikari as well as the present time leaders like Shekhar Koirala, Upendra Yadav, etc.

The district currently sends 6 members to the national legislature.

== Administrative divisions ==
The district consists of one Metropolitan Cities, eight urban municipalities and eight rural municipalities. These are as follows:

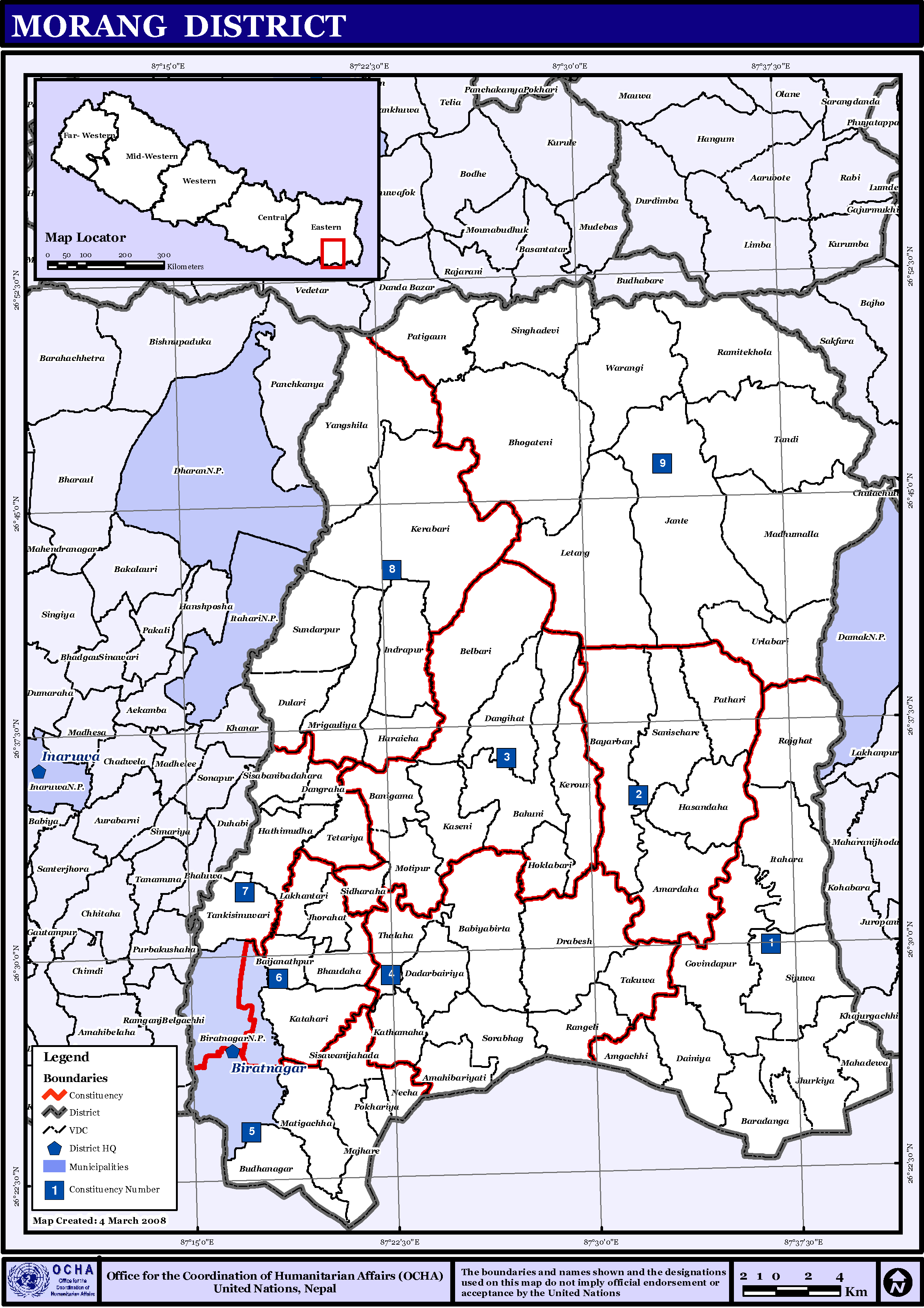
Map of the VDCs in Morang District

=== Municipalities ===
- Biratnagar Metropolitan City
- Sundar Haraicha Municipality
- Belbari Municipality
- Pathari-Sanischare Municipality
- Urlabari Municipality
- Rangeli Municipality
- Letang Municipality
- Ratuwamai Municipality
- Sunawarshi Municipality

=== Rural Municipalities ===
- Kerabari Rural Municipality
- Miklajung Rural Municipality
- Kanepokhari Rural Municipality
- Budhiganga Rural Municipality
- Gramthan Rural Municipality
- Katahari Rural Municipality
- Dhanpalthan Rural Municipality
- Jahada Rural Municipality

== Notable people ==
- Rekha Thapa, Actress
- Madan Bhandari, Political Leader
- Suman Pokhrel, Poet, Lyricist, Translator
- Ghanashyam Khatiwada, Member of House of Representative, Morang 1
- Nikita Chandak, Miss Nepal 2017
- Yama Buddha, Rapper
- Shekhar Koirala, Member of Legislature Parliament of Nepal
- Shiva Maya Tumbahamphe, Member of House of Representative,

Proportionate (CPN-UML)

- Lal Babu Pandit, Member of House of Representative, Morang 6
