= Banke 3 =

Parliamentary constituency in Nepal

- Parliamentary constituency
- Banke 3 in Lumbini Province
- Province: Lumbini Province
- District: Banke District

Current constituency
- Created: 1991
- Party: Nepali Congress
- Member of Parliament: Khagendra Sunar (RSP)

Banke 3 one of three parliamentary constituencies of Banke District in Nepal. This constituency came into existence on the Constituency Delimitation Commission (CDC) report submitted on 31 August 2017.

== Incorporated areas ==
Banke 3 incorporates Baijanath Rural Municipality, Khajura Rural Municipality, Janaki Rural Municipality and wards 16 and 17 of Nepalgunj Sub-metropolitan City.

== Assembly segments ==
It encompasses the following Lumbini Provincial Assembly segment

- Banke 3(A)
- Banke 3(B)

== Members of Parliament ==
=== Parliament/Constituent Assembly ===
Election	Member	Party
1991	Krishna Singh Pariyar	Nepali Congress
1994	Fateh Singh Tharu	Rastriya Prajatantra Party
March 1997	Fateh Singh Tharu	Rastriya Prajatantra Party (Chand)
1999	Kailash Nath Kasudhan	Nepali Congress
2008	Sarbadev Ojha	Madhesi Janaadhikar Forum, Nepal
June 2009	Sarbadev Ojha	Madhesi Janaadhikar Forum, Nepal (Democratic)
2013	Sushil Koirala	Nepali Congress
2017	Nanda Lal Roka Chhetri	CPN (Unified Marxist–Leninist)
May 2018	Nanda Lal Roka Chhetri	Federal Socialist Forum, Nepal
2022	Kishor Singh Rathore	Nepali Congress
2026	Khagendra Sunar	Rastriya Swatantra Party

=== Provincial Assembly ===
==== 3(A) ====
Election	Member	Party
2017	Indra Prasad Kharel	CPN (Maoist Centre)
May 2018	Indra Prasad Kharel	Nepal Communist Party

==== 3(B) ====
Election	Member	Party
2017	Babu Ram Gautam	CPN (Unified Marxist–Leninist)
May 2018	Babu Ram Gautam	Nepal Communist Party

== Election results ==
=== Election in the 2020s ===
==== 2026 general election ====
Candidate	Party	Votes	%
Khagendra Sunar	Rastriya Swatantra Party	29,551	42.06
Suman Malla	CPN (UML)	19,615	27.92
Amar Singh Pun	Nepali Congress	13,215	18.81
Dipak Kumar Gauri Magar	Nepali Communist Party	4,015	5.71
Tarak Singh Tharu	Rastriya Prajatantra Party	1,912	2.72
Others		1,951	2.78
Total		70,259	100.00
Majority		9,936	
Rastriya Swatantra Party gain			

==== 2022 general election ====
Candidate	Party	Votes	%
Kishore Singh Rathore	Nepali Congress	29,097	42.12
Kismat Kumar Kashyapati	CPN (UML)	24,305	35.19
Devendra Nath Shukla	Rastriya Swatantra Party	7,467	10.81
Noyendra Dhital	People's Socialist Party, Nepal	4,291	6.21
Raju Prasad Kurmi	Janamat Party	2,527	3.66
Others		1,387	2.01
Total		69,074	100.00
Majority		4,792	
Nepali Congress gain			

=== Election in the 2010s ===
==== 2017 legislative elections ====
Party	Candidate	Votes
CPN (Unified Marxist–Leninist)	Nanda Lal Roka Chhetri	31,601
Nepali Congress	Badshah Kurmi	26,617
Federal Socialist Forum, Nepal	Manoj Kumar Dixit	2,737
Rastriya Janta Party Nepal	Mahamudul Hasan Ansari	1,711
Others		897
Invalid votes		3,981
Result	CPN (UML) gain	
Source: Election Commission

==== 2017 Nepalese provincial elections ====
===== 3(A) =====
Party	Candidate	Votes
CPN (Maoist Centre)	Indra Prasad Kharel	16,675
Nepali Congress	Chanta Ram Tharu	14,981
Others		2,417
Invalid votes		1,536
Result	Maoist Centre gain	
Source: Election Commission

===== 3(B) =====
Party	Candidate	Votes
CPN (Unified Marxist–Leninist)	Babu Ram Gautam	11,877
Nepali Congress	Laxmi Narayan Shah	7,592
Independent	Bijay Kumar Pathak	4,240
Independent	Zakir Khan	2,109
Federal Socialist Forum, Nepal	Ram Suhaban Kumri	1,850
Others		1,692
Invalid votes		2,459
Result	CPN (UML) gain	
Source: Election Commission

==== 2013 Constituent Assembly election ====
Party	Candidate	Votes
Nepali Congress	Sushil Koirala	10,753
Rastriya Prajatantra Party Nepal	Dhawal SJB Rana	8,809
UCPN (Maoist)	Damodar Acharya	6,135
Terai Madhesh Loktantrik Party	Pashupati Dayal Mishra	4,016
CPN (Unified Marxist–Leninist)	Bijaya Dhital	2,497
Madhesi Janaadhikar Forum, Nepal	Kaushal Kumar Mishra	1,047
Others		4,525
Result	Congress gain	
Source: NepalNews

=== Election in the 2000s ===
==== 2008 Constituent Assembly election ====
Party	Candidate	Votes
Madhesi Janaadhikar Forum, Nepal	Sarbadev Ojha	14,900
CPN (Maoist)	Parmananda Kurmi	6,970
Nepali Congress	Sushil Koirala	5,969
Rastriya Prajatantra Party	Dhawal SJB Rana	4,383
CPN (Unified Marxist–Leninist)	Samsuddin Siddiqi	3,322
Others		2,788
Invalid votes		2,157
Result	Forum Nepal gain	
Source: Election Commission

=== Election in the 1990s ===
==== 1999 legislative elections ====
Party	Candidate	Votes
Nepali Congress	Kailash Nath Kasudhan	12,086
CPN (Marxist–Leninist)	Dal Bahadur Sunar	8,735
CPN (Unified Marxist–Leninist)	Ful Singh Tharu	8,636
Rastriya Prajatantra Party (Chand)	Fateh Singh Tharu	5,594
Independent	Mohaiyuddin Kawadiya	3,091
Nepal Sadbhavana Party	Satyawati Kurmi	1,593
Others		2,138
Invalid votes		1,469
Result	Congress gain	
Source: Election Commission

==== 1994 legislative elections ====
Party	Candidate	Votes
Rastriya Prajatantra Party	Fateh Singh Tharu	13,659
CPN (Unified Marxist–Leninist)	Hari Parajuli	10,638
Nepali Congress	Meraj Ahmed Sah	9,724
Nepal Sadbhavana Party	Satyawati Kurmi	1,524
Communist Party of Nepal (Marxist)	Nanda Lal Roka Chhetri	1,232
Others		707
Result	RPP gain	
Source: Election Commission

==== 1991 legislative elections ====
Party	Candidate	Votes
Nepali Congress	Krishna Singh Pariyar	12,473
CPN (Unified Marxist–Leninist)		9,837
Result	Congress gain	

== See also ==
- List of parliamentary constituencies of Nepal
