= Janaki Rural Municipality (Banke District) =

Janaki Rural Municipality जानकी गाउँपालिका
- Rural Municipality
- Location in Lumbini Province Janaki Rural Municipality (Nepal)
- Coordinates: 28.115513°N 81.611785°E
- Country: Nepal
- Province: Lumbini
- District: Banke
- No. of wards: 6
- Established: 10 March 2017
- Incorporated (VDC): Saigaun, Belbhar, Khajura Khurda, Belahari and Ganapur

Government
  - Chairperson: Chhabban Khan (NC)
  - Vice-chairperson: Ram Pyari Yadav (NC)

Area
  - Total: 63.32 km^{2} (24.45 sq mi)

Population (2021)
  - Total: 46,536
  - Density: 734.9/km^{2} (1,903/sq mi)
- Time zone: UTC+5:45 (Nepal Standard Time)
- Headquarter: Khajura Khurda
- Website: Official Website

Janaki Rural Municipality (Nepali: जानकी गाउँपालिका, romanized: Jānakī gā'um̐pālikā) is a rural municipality located in Banke District, within Lumbini Province of Nepal.

The rural municipality was established in 2017 following the restructuring of local level units by the Government of Nepal. As part of this restructuring, 753 new local level units were created by dissolving the previous thousands of local bodies. Janaki Rural Municipality was formed by merging the then Village Development Committees (VDCs) of Saigaun, Belbhar, Khajura Khurda, Belahari, and Ganapur. Additionally, a small portion (ward no. 23) of the then Nepalganj municipality (rural area) was also incorporated into this new local unit.

The total area of Janaki Rural Municipality is 63.32 square kilometres (24.45 sq mi), and it is administratively divided into 6 wards. According to the 2011 Nepal census, the population was 37,839, which increased to 46,536 as per the 2021 Nepal census.

== Demographics ==
According to the 2011 Nepal census, Janaki Rural Municipality had a population of 37,847.

In terms of first language, the population was as follows:

- 59.8% spoke Awadhi
- 22.5% spoke Urdu
- 13.3% spoke Nepali
- 2.1% spoke Maithili
- 0.6% spoke Magar
- 0.4% each spoke Doteli and Tharu
- 0.3% spoke Newar
- 0.2% spoke Bhojpuri
- 0.4% spoke other languages

Regarding ethnicity/caste, the distribution was:

- 22.3% Musalman
- 8.7% Yadav
- 7.3% Kurmi
- 7.0% Chamar/Harijan/Ram
- 6.8% Chhetri
- 6.0% Kanu
- 4.0% other Dalit
- 2.9% Magar
- 2.5% other Terai
- 32.5% others

In terms of religion:

- 76.4% were Hindu
- 22.2% were Muslim
- 0.7% were Christian
- 0.4% were Buddhist
- 0.1% were Kirati
- 0.2% followed other religions
