= Udayapur =

Udayapur may refer to:

- Udayapur, Banke, a Village Development Committee in the Banke District of Lumbini Province, Nepal
- Udayapur, Kapilvastu, a village in Kapilvastu District of Lumbini Province, Nepal
- Udayapur District, a district in Koshi Province, Nepal
- Udaypur Dhursi, a village development committee in the Parsa District of Madhesh Province, Nepal
- Udaypur, Kalna, a village in Kalna II CD Block, Kalna subdivision, Bardhaman district, West Bengal, India
- Udaypur, Madhya Pradesh, a village in the Vidisha district of Madhya Pradesh, India
- Udaypur, Nayagarh, a village in Nayagarh district, Odisha, India
- Udaypur Wildlife Sanctuary, a wildlife sanctuary in the West Champaran district of Bihar state, India

== See also ==
- Udaipur (disambiguation)
