= Ruby Khan =

Nepalese women's rights activist (born c. 1988)

Ruby Khan (Nepali: रुबी खान; born c. 1988) is a Nepalese women's rights activist. In October 2021, she received national attention when she led a protest march from Nepalgunj to Kathmandu, followed by a sit-in protest, to demand an investigation into the disappearance and death of two women in Banke District. Khan subsequently led similar protests from December 2021 until January 2022, and between January and March 2023.

== Early life ==
Khan was born and raised in Nepalgunj, Lumbini Province. Her father did not believe in educating girls, but after her parents separated, Khan's mother saved money to send Khan to a local school. She went on to obtain a degree in sociology from a university in India.

== Activism ==
When she was 14, Khan began working for Mahila Adhikar Manch (MAM; lit. 'National Women's Rights Forum'), acting as a liaison worker between women, human rights organisations and law enforcement agencies. In 2007, Khan led her first protest outside municipal buildings in Nepalgunj after a woman was burned alive by her husband. In 2008, she became MAM's general secretary.

=== First protest: October 2021 ===
In 2010, Nirmala Kurmi went missing from her home in the Janaki Rural Municipality in Banke District. Kurmi had become a landowner following the death of her husband; her two sons had been killed in 2008. Khan worked with Kurmi in 2009 when the latter presented as a victim of domestic abuse seeking support from MAM. On 20 July 2021, Nakunni Dhobi was found dead in her home, also in Banke District. Dhobi's death was ruled as a suicide despite her body having significant bruising, and her previously having been known to MAM due to concerns around domestic abuse from her husband.

In August 2021, Khan called on the District Police Office, Banke to investigate Dhobi's death, in addition to reopening its investigation into Kurmi's disappearance, accusing them of not taking the investigations seriously and holding a protest outside their offices. The police turned Khan and other activists away, reiterating that Dhobi had died by suicide and claiming that Kurmi had died and had funeral rites whilst in India. Khan has stated her belief that the women's fates were linked to attempts to forcibly acquire their lands, with both Kurmi and Dhobi being landowners at the time of their disappearance and death, respectively.

In September 2021, Khan and 13 other activists marched over 500 km from Nepalgunj to Kathmandu, arriving at Maitighar Mandala in October and staging a sit-in protest demanding justice for Kurmi and Dhobi. On 8 October, Khan was arrested on charges of polygamy following an argument with police officers, and her whereabouts were unknown. Following public outcry, the Supreme Court of Nepal issued a habeas corpus on 10 October demanding that Khan be presented to them within 24 hours; the police did not comply with the order, but Khan was subsequently taken to a court hearing on 14 October. Khan reported that the police had said they would release her if she ended her protest. The Supreme Court ordered Khan's release, stating that there was no evidence to substantiate the charge of polygamy, and accusing the police of acting with "male fide intent".

Following Khan's release, the Ministry of Home Affairs met with Khan and other protesters and agreed to form an investigative committee to further investigate what happened to Kurmi and Dhobi. The protest officially ended on 18 October.

=== Second protest: December 2021 – January 2022 ===
The investigative committee set up by the Ministry of Home Affairs visited Banke District; their investigation ultimately led to the arrests of Ram Kumar Dhobi and Itwarbi Dhobi, who were charged with the murder of Nakunni Dhobi.

The committee did not pursue any charges in relation to Kurmi's disappearance; Khan publicly named local politician Badhshah Kurmi as a culprit, stating that Kurmi had reported he had been harassing her a few weeks prior to her disappearance. Khan claimed that Badhshah Kurmi was not being investigated seriously due to him being a local leader of the Nepali Congress party; she also reported that he had threatened MAM activists taking part in the protests. In protest, she led a further march to Kathmandu, once again staging a sit-in at Maitighar Mandala. In addition, Khan also went on hunger strike.

The Ministry of Home Affairs subsequently intervened and agreed that the Central Investigation Bureau would carry out further investigation into Kurmi's disappearance. Khan agreed to end her hunger strike on 4 January 2022, and she and the other protesters returned to Nepalgunj.

=== Third protest: January–March 2023 ===
Khan led a further march to Kathmandu after Badhshah Kurmi was elected to serve in the Lumbini Provincial Assembly despite being a suspect in Kurmi's disappearance. Khan was arrested early into the protest, but was released the same day. The protests lasted for 48 days until Khan met with the Prime Minister of Nepal, Pushpa Kamal Dahal, who agreed to form another investigation committee, this time under the Inspector General of the Nepal Police.
