= Bageswari =

Bageswari may refer to:

- Bageswari, Bangladesh
- Bageshwari, Banke, Nepal
