= Mohna Ansari =

Nepali lawyer and human rights activist

- मोहना अन्सारी
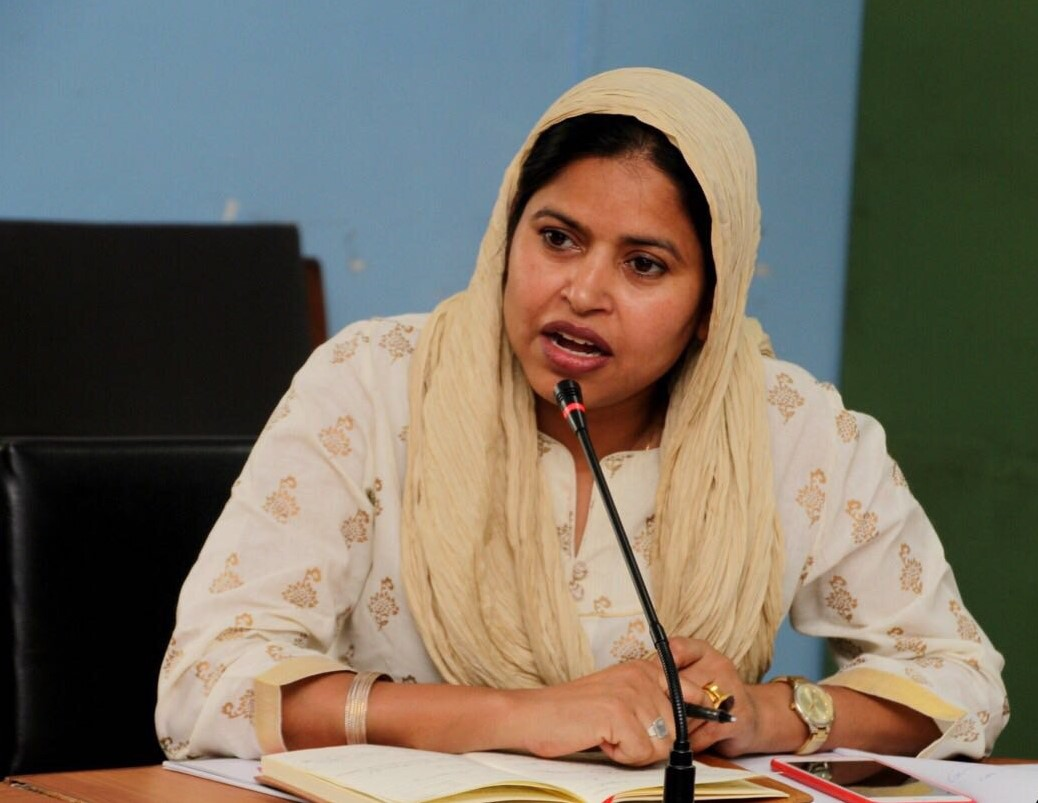

Member of National Human Rights Commission, Nepal.
- Incumbent
- Assumed office October 2014

Personal details
- Born: Nepalgunj, Banke. Nepal.
- Party: Nepali Congress (2026-)
- Education: Tribhuwan University
- Occupation: Advocate, activist

Mohna Ansari (Nepali: मोहना अन्सारी) is a member of National Human Rights Commission of Nepal. She was appointed to this position in October 2014. She is a well-known rights activist, and Nepal's only female attorney from the Muslim community. She worked as a commissioner at the National Women Commission (NWC) of Nepal between 2010 and 2014. She then worked as the Senior Advisor of IDEA International.

== Early life ==
Mohna Ansari was born in Nepalganj, Banke, in a lower middle-class Muslim family. She grew up in ailani land (public land informally owned) with her family. When she was in the six grade, the land reform program introduced by the government allowed her father to pay taxes and claim ownership of the land. However, there was a counter-claim on their land, and her father lost her case in the court. She attributes this incident as inspiration to become a lawyer later in life. Her family's sole source of income was her father's carpentry shop. However, her parents are illiterate, so they wanted their kids to be educated and to have careers in different sectors. Her brothers went to English medium boarding school, while she went to government school but according to her she was happy that her parent sent her to school where she got education not only Islamic but also modern education.

Financial issues plagued her college education and she was forced to drop out after her first year. She joined college three years later upon getting a scholarship. Then, she enrolled in a bachelor in law at Mahendra Multiple Campus, the only government college in Nepalgunj and graduated in 2003. During her studies, she supported herself by teaching in schools and working as a private tutor. She also found time to write articles about issues affecting women and children for local newspapers. She has an additional degree, a master's degree in sociology. She also participated in a course on the "Human Rights and Peace Studies" conducted by South Asian Forum for Human Rights (SAFHR) in 2004.

== Career ==
She started her career as a journalist at a young age, reporting mainly on women and children issues, and partially got involved with the work of the Amnesty International Nepal as well as INSEC. She was appointed by the government as a member of the Regional Sports Development Committee for Mid-Western Region in 1994. After her graduation in 2003, she joined the Nepal Bar Association Banke and managed a legal assistance program for vulnerable women and children.

From 2004 to 2010, Ansari worked with several national and international organizations including Action Aid Nepal, the McConnell Foundation, the Women's Power Development Center and the UNDP covering the areas of women empowerment and social inclusion, gender and equity, legal education, conflict resolution, peace building and mediation and human rights. As one of the expert panel appointed by the SNV Nepal in 2010, she wrote a paper for the National Inclusion Commission (NIC) on social inclusion of Muslims in Nepal. She is also a master trainer of the “Gender and Equity Concerns” and has trained hundreds of men and women.

She presented papers on women and children's issues in international forums in India, Pakistan, Bangladesh, Sri Lanka, Philippines, Indonesia, Malaysia, Thailand, Cambodia, the Netherlands, Belgium, and United States. Recently in 2014, she presented a paper on “Statelessness Among Women and Children in Nepal” in the Global Forum on Statelessness in The Hague.

== Controversy ==
In 2016, Ansari attended the Universal Periodic Review of Nepal at the Human Rights Council in Geneva as a member of the National Human Rights Commission. Speaking on behalf of the commission, Ansari spoke about the use of state force in the suppression of the Madhesh movement, and discriminatory citizenship provisions. While she was leading an investigation team for the Madhesh movement, the team found that live ammunition was used instead of rubber bullets. Following this meeting, the then Prime Minister KP Sharma Oli raised questions with NHRC Chairman Anup Raj Sharma and other commissioners about the speech. Nikhil Narayan, the senior legal adviser to ICJ (South Asia), said this summons and criticism threatened members of the NHRC, and prevented the commission from discharging its duties independently.

== Awards and honours ==
Ansari has received recognition for her work and has been honored with the following awards.

- Suprabal Jana Sewa Shree award in 2012 by the president of Nepal, for public service.
- Nava Devi Award, also in 2012, an award that recognizes and honors real life female heroes of Nepal.
- Nominated as one of 10 Asian women presented as “Portraits of Leadership” in an event organized by The Asia Foundation in California, USA in 2008.
