= Plug-in electric vehicles in Nepal =

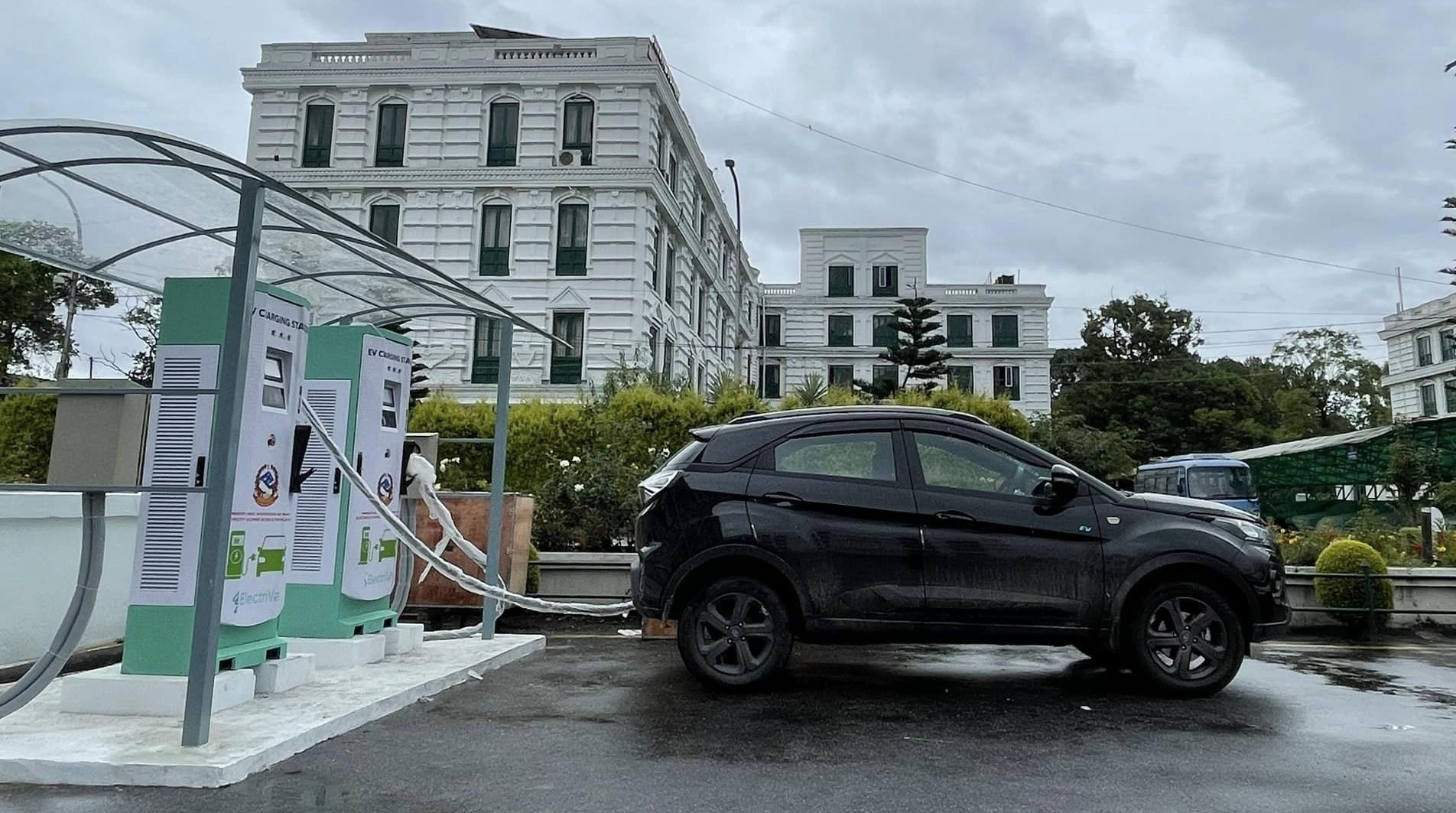
Charging station in government office, Kathmandu.

Nepal leads with the newest car sales of electric vehicles in 2023 with 83% of new car purchases being electric. Nepal has witnessed significant growth in the adoption of electric vehicles (EVs), fueled by a combination of favorable policies, rising environmental awareness, and cost-effectiveness. As of 2023, around 45,000 electric vehicles are operating in the country, with sales more than doubling in recent years. In the fiscal year 2022–23, Nepal imported 4,050 electric four-wheelers, marking a significant rise compared to previous years. The total market for EVs, including three-wheelers, has also expanded, with 6,914 electric three-wheelers imported in the same year. The sales ratio of EVs to internal combustion engine (ICE) vehicles now stands at an impressive 60:40, indicating the growing preference for EVs among consumers.

== Why electric vehicles make sense in Nepal ==
Several factors make EVs a highly attractive option in Nepal:

- Lower Import Tax: Electric vehicles benefit from a much lower import tax (about 10%) compared to ICE vehicles (238%). This makes EVs a more economical choice for consumers.
- Clean Energy Source: Nepal generates over 90% of its electricity from hydropower, making EVs a sustainable option that helps reduce the country's dependence on imported fossil fuels.
- Economic Savings: EVs are cheaper to maintain and operate compared to their fossil-fuel counterparts. An EV can cover 100 miles on just 30 kWh of charge, compared to higher fuel costs for traditional vehicles.

== Challenges and policy roadblocks ==
Despite these benefits, there are still challenges in Nepal's transition to electric mobility. The country faces a shortage of charging infrastructure, with around 250 charging stations currently installed. The Nepal Electricity Authority (NEA) has ambitious plans to expand this number by adding 500 more charging stations across the country. However, policy contradictions and fluctuating tax regulations continue to create uncertainty. In recent years, taxes on EVs have fluctuated, with higher taxes being imposed on high-end electric vehicles, although entry-level EVs still enjoy favorable tax rates.

Additionally, public awareness and availability of after-sales service remain areas of concern. Many potential buyers are hesitant due to "range anxiety" and concerns about the reliability of charging stations on highways, particularly in rural areas.

== Public transportation and EVs ==
Electric vehicles are also making inroads in Nepal's public transportation system. Several cities, including Kathmandu, Pokhara, and Nepalgunj, have introduced electric buses, and the Bagmati Province now mandates that all new taxis must be electric. Despite these positive developments, further investment in commercial EVs is needed to realize the full potential of electric public transport.
