= Sarbadev Ojha =

Nepali politician

- सर्वदेव प्रसाद ओझा

Member of the Constituent Assembly
- In office 28 May 2008 – 28 May 2012
- Preceded by: Kailash Nath Kasudhan (as Member of Parliament)
- Succeeded by: Sushil Koirala
- Constituency: Banke 3

Personal details
- Party: Madhesi Janadhikar Forum
- Other political affiliations: Madhesi Janadhikar Forum (Democratic)

Sarbadev Prasad Ojha (Nepali: सर्वदेव प्रसाद ओझा) is a Nepalese politician, belonging to the Madhesi Janadhikar Forum. Ojha is the president of MJF in the Banke district. In April 2008, he won the Banke-3 seat in the Constituent Assembly election.
