= Holiya =

Holiya may refer to:-

- A town named Holiya in Nepal - Holiya, Nepal
- An ethnic group of India called - Holiya (caste)
- A language of India - Holiya language
