= Nanda Lal Roka Chhetri =

Nepali politician

- नन्द लाल रोका क्षेत्री

Member of Parliament, Pratinidhi Sabha
- In office 4 March 2018 – 18 September 2022
- Preceded by: Sushil Koirala (as Member of the Constituent Assembly)
- Succeeded by: Kishore Singh Rathore
- Constituency: Banke 3

Personal details
- Born: 27 September 1949 (age 76)
- Party: CPN (UML)

Nanda Lal Roka Chhetri is a Nepali politician and a former member of the Pratinidhi Sabha of the federal parliament of Nepal. He was elected from Banke-3 constituency, representing CPN UML.
