= Bageshwori Temple =

Hindu temple in Nepal

- बागेश्वरी मन्दिर
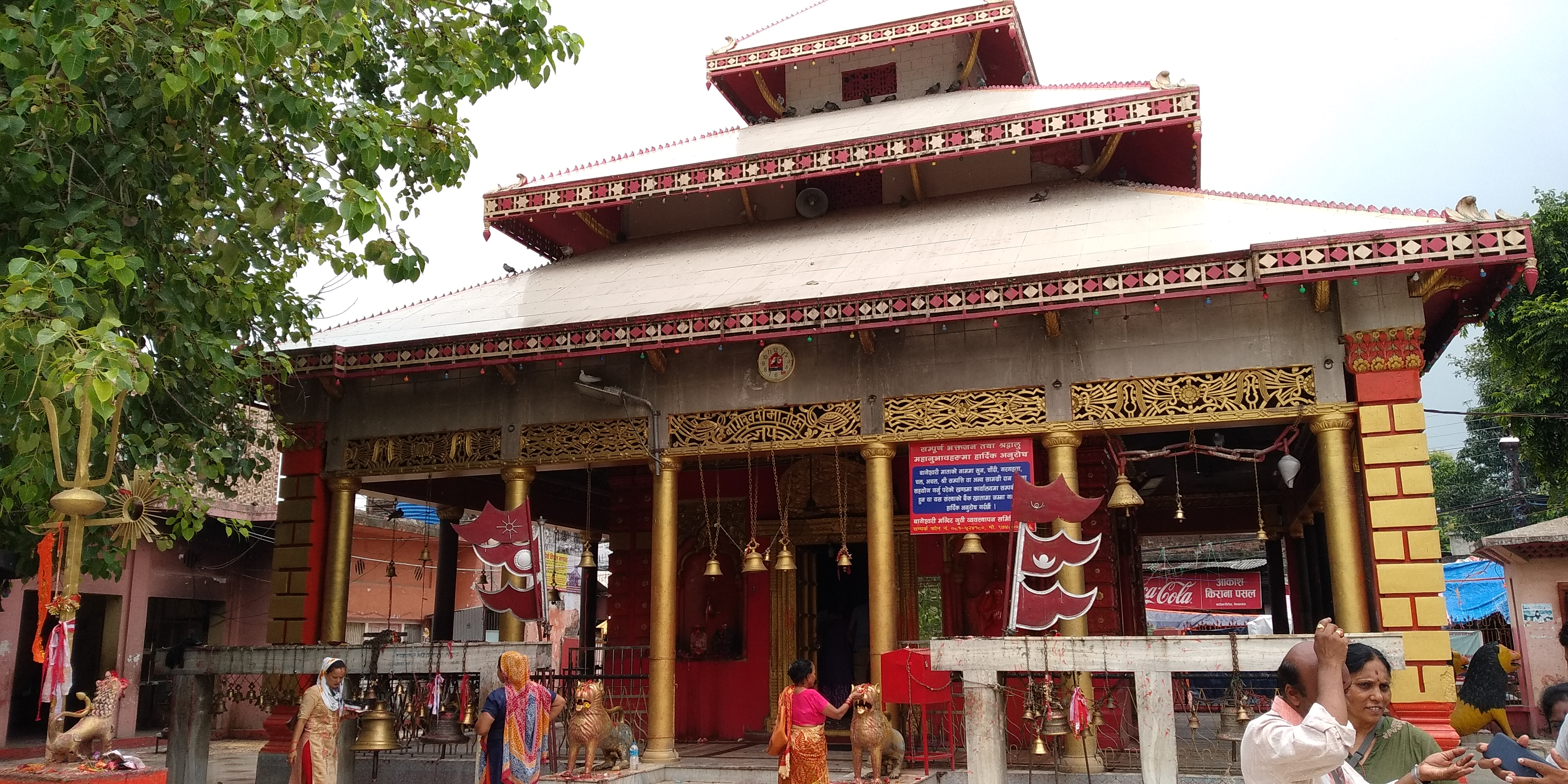

- Location within Nepal

Religion
- Affiliation: Hinduism
- Deity: Durga

Location
- Location: Nepalgunj, Banke
- Country: Nepal
- Interactive map of Bageshwori Temple
- Coordinates: 28.0617°N 81.6238°E

Architecture
- Type: Pagoda

Bageshwori Temple (Nepali: बागेश्वरी मन्दिर) is one of the most important Hindu temples in Nepal. It is at the center of Nepalgunj, in Lumbini province. It is dedicated to goddess Bageshwori- Durga. The temple area also houses another famous temple- the temple of Shiva with mustache, which is one of the only two such temples in the country.

== Mythology ==
It is believed that Satidevi's tongue fell at this location who was being carried by Shiva after her death. The temple complex also has a rare shrine to Lord Shiva with a mustache.

In another popular incident, in 1926 (Nepali calendar 1983) Padma Kumari Devi Singh (11 yrs) who lived in Kailash Bhawan, Gharbari Tole road (Ward-2), Nepalgunj, went to pray at the Bageshwori temple as on that day she was very sad. The temple was empty and even the 'Bajes' (Brahmins) were not to be seen. She sat at the single open door of the temple closed her eyes and prayed. When she opened her eyes she saw a small child, very poor (like a beggar child) in a long ragged garment standing before her. The child said 'lah' (in Nepali lah means take) and put something in Padma's palm and closed it. When Padma opened her hand, there was nothing there and when she looked up, the child had disappeared. The incident had occurred in a matter of a second. It was with the blessings of the Goddess Bageshwori that the very next day Thakur Ananda Swarup Singh (father of Padma Kumari Devi) received a proposal for her marriage which he accepted and in 1930 at Singha Durbar, Kathmandu, Padma Kumari Devi was married to Maj-Gen. Mahabir S. J. B. Rana son of Late Shri Col. Maharajkumar Prakash S. J. B. Rana (who was the maker of the Junge Mahadev temple at Nepalgunj) and grandson of Cdg. Gen. Shri Tin Maharaj Sir Bhim Shumsher Jung Bahadur Rana, Maharaj of Lamjanj and Kaski, who was Prime Minister of Nepal. Since then the number of visitors in the temple has increased at a very high rate.

== Temple complex ==
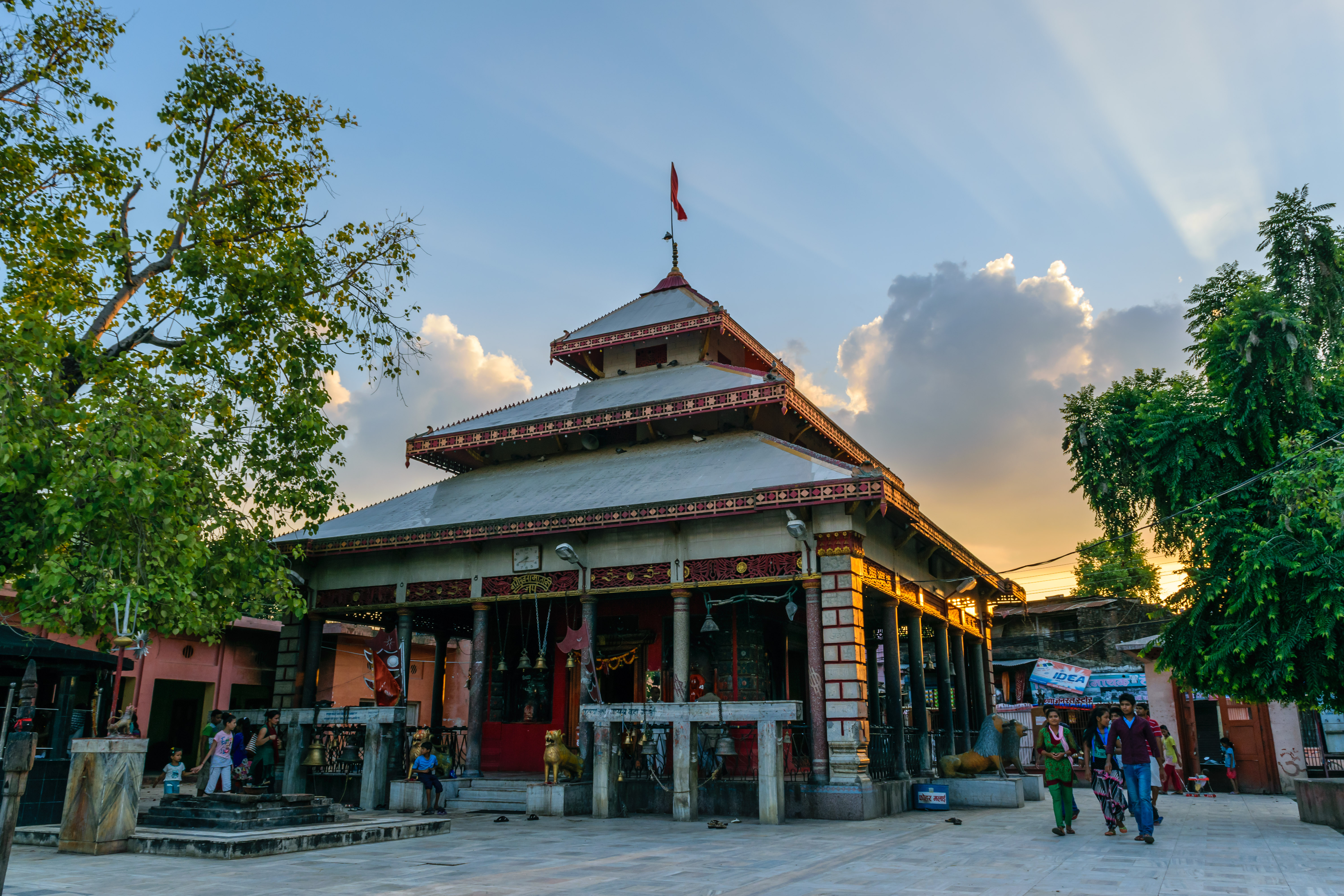
Side view of the temple

There are several other smaller temples inside the temple area including a temple of Buddha, statue of Ganesha, and the temple of Hanuman. The Bageshwori pond that is situated within the temple area is also famous among the devotees, specially for the reason that the temple of Shiva with mustache stands at the center of it.

== Attractions ==
Bageshwori temple is known to be one of the oldest in the region, and the oldest temple in Banke District. Every year it attracts a large number of devotees from around the country, as well as from the nearest border cities of India. Especially in the festival of Dasain, the biggest festival in the country, the temple receives a huge crowd of people wishing to pray the goddess and offer animal sacrifices. The temple receives huge number of devotee visitors on festivals such as Shivaratri, Teej, Magh Shukla Purnima. The temple's image can be seen in Nepalese one-rupees coins and postal stamps.
