= Sushil Koirala Memorial Foundation =

- सुशील कोइराला मेमोरियल फाउन्डेसन
- Abbreviation: SKMF
- Named after: Sushil Koirala
- Type: Non Governmental Organization
- Headquarters: Dhapasi, Kathmandu
- Location: Kathmandu
- Chairman: Dr. Shashanka Koirala
- Member Secretary: Atul Koirala
- Website: http://www.sushilkoiralamemorialfoundation.org/

The Sushil Koirala Memorial Foundation was founded in 2016 as a memorial to the late Prime Minister of Nepal, Sushil Koirala, with the stated mission to "Empower communities through idea propagation dedicated to strategic thinking based on the principles of democracy, socio-economic reform and open society".

== Works ==
Sushil Koirala Memorial Foundation has actively organized and supported many events such as a discussion program and has supported various sports related activities. In February 2018, it worked alongside Madan Bhandari Sports Academy to successfully organize the 1st Grand Cricket Carnival of Nepal and played its part by awarding cricket kits to aspiring young cricketers selected from the Talent Hunt during the carnival.
