= Sonapur, Banke =

Sonapur, Nepal सोनापुर
- Village development committee
- Location in Lumbini Province Sonapur, Nepal (Nepal)
- Coordinates: 28.15°N 81.55°E
- Country: Nepal
- Province: Lumbini Province
- District: Banke District

Population (1991)
  - Total: 5,551
- Time zone: UTC+5:45 (Nepal Time)

Sonapur is a village development committee in Banke District in Lumbini Province of south-western Nepal. At the time of the 1991 Nepal census it had a population of 5,551 and had 1051 houses in the town.
