= Udarapur =

Udarapur उदरापुर
- Village development committee
- Location in Lumbini Province Udarapur (Nepal)
- Coordinates: 28.13°N 81.53°E
- Country: Nepal
- Province: Lumbini Province
- District: Banke District

Population (1991)
  - Total: 6,347
- Time zone: UTC+5:45 (Nepal Time)

Villages of Banke District

Udarapur is a village development committee in Banke District in Lumbini Province of south-western Nepal. At the time of the 1991 Nepal census it had a population of 6,347 and had 1173 houses in the town.
