= QFX Cinemas =

Cinema chain in Nepal

- Company type: Private Company
- Industry: Entertainment (Cinema Chain)
- Founders: Rajesh Siddhi
- Headquarters: Kathmandu, Nepal
- Area served: Nepal
- Key people: Nakim Udin
- Owner: TeamQuest
- Website: www.qfxcinemas.com

QFX Cinemas is a cinema chain in Nepal with cinemas in the major cities of Nepal. It was founded by Rajesh Siddhi, Bhaskar Dhungana and Nakim Uddin. It features Nepali movies as well as Bollywood and Hollywood movies.

== History ==
QFX Cinemas started with the renovation of Jai Nepal Cinema, which is the oldest cinema house in Nepal. Following the development, Jai Nepal and company revamped and launched Kumari hall. QFX Civil Mall in Sundhara is Nepal's first most advanced multiplex. After successfully operating its chain in Kathmandu Valley, QFX Cinemas opened franchise model: Bageshwori theater in Nepalgunj, Jalma theater in Narayanghat, Chitwan, Cineplex theater in Pokhara. As of January 2017, the company had 15 screens in Nepal.

== Features ==
QFX Labim Mall in Pulchowk, Lalitpur is the first multiplex of Nepal to be equipped with a high resolution 4K digital cinema projection system. QFX Cinemas multiplex are equipped with digital projectors from Barco, a proponent of digital cinema technology.

== Gallery ==
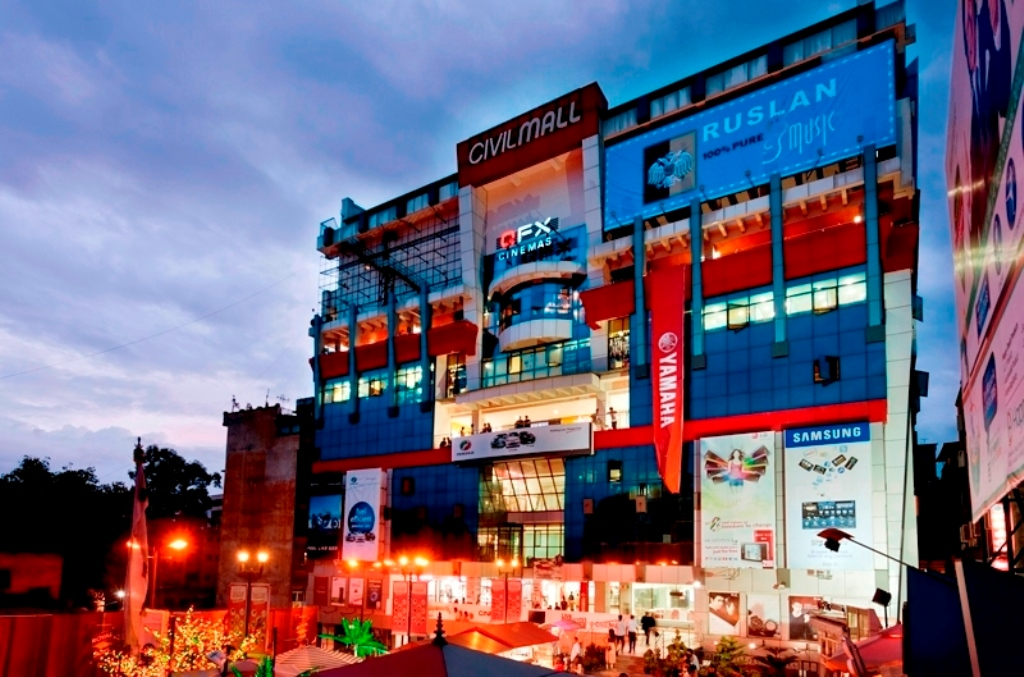
QFX Civil Mall, Sundhara, Kathmandu

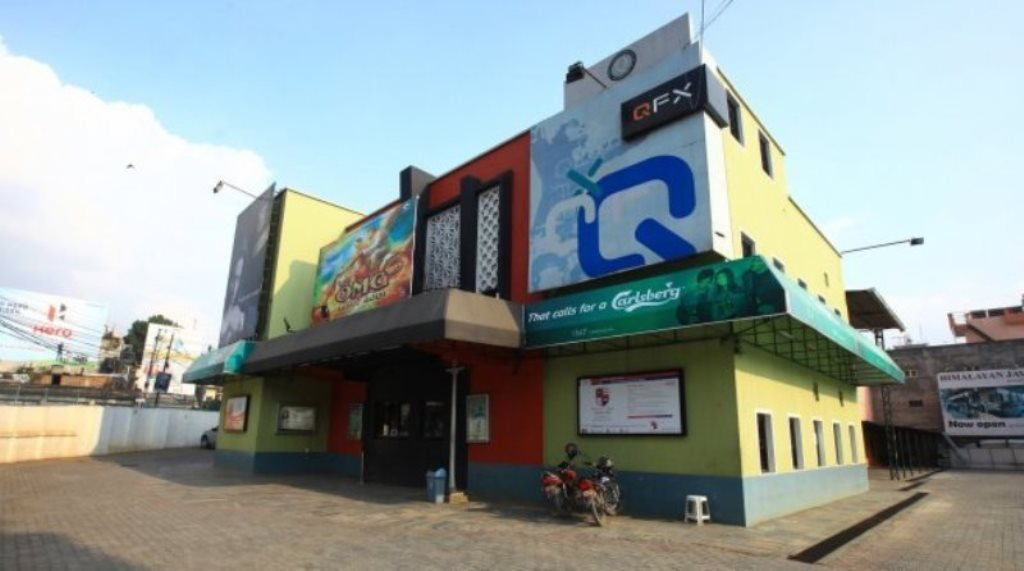
QFX Jai Nepal, Narayanhiti Marg, Kathmandu

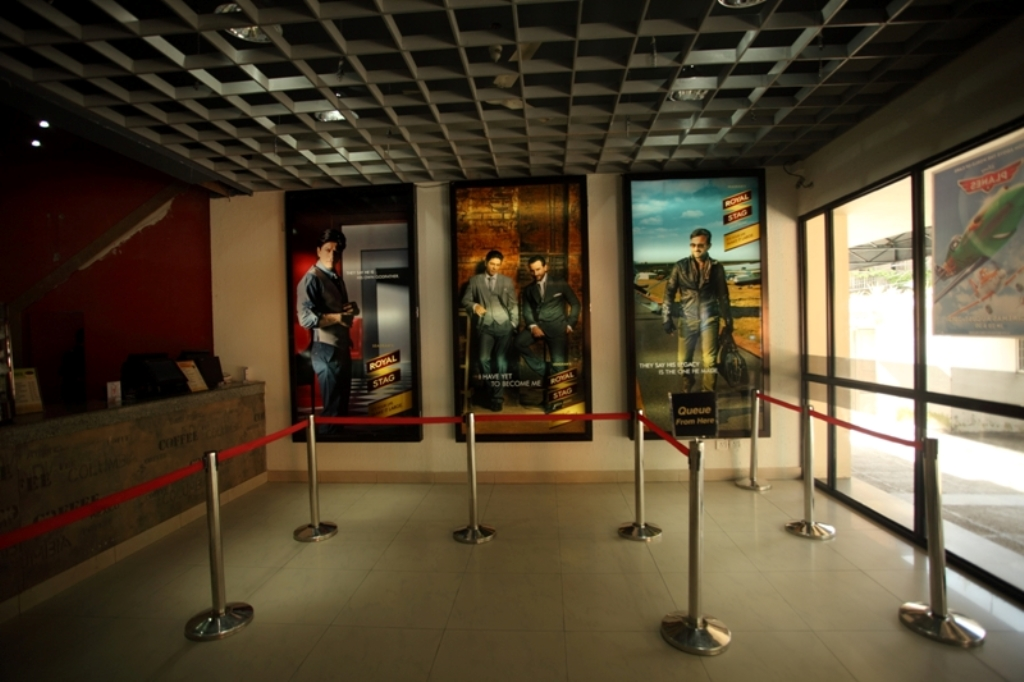
Ticket Counter of QFX Cinemas

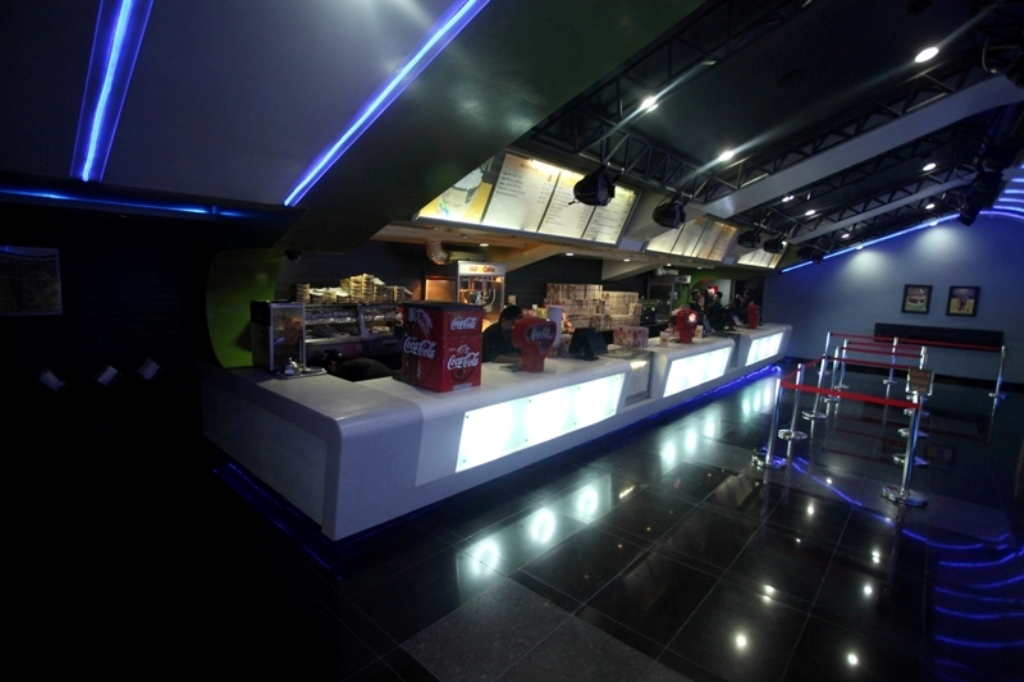
Food Court in QFX Cinemas
