= Titahiriya =

Coordinates: 28°10′N 81°32′E

Titahiriya तिताहिरिया
- Village development committee
- Location in Lumbini Province Titahiriya (Nepal)
- Country: Nepal
- Province: Lumbini Province
- District: Banke District

Population (1991)
  - Total: 6,986
- Time zone: UTC+5:45 (Nepal Time)

Titahiriya is a village development committee in Banke District in Lumbini Province of south-western Nepal. At the time of the 1991 Nepal census it had a population of 6,986 and had 970 houses in the town.
