= Parsapur =

Coordinates: 28°4′N 81°36′E

Paraspur परसपुर
- Presently Ward No.17 of Nepalgunj Sub-Metropolitan City
- Location in Lumbini Province Paraspur (Nepal)
- Country: Nepal
- Province: Lumbini Province
- District: Banke District

Population (1991)
  - Total: 3,201
- Time zone: UTC+5:45 (Nepal Time)

Paraspur is a village development committee in Banke District in Lumbini Province of south-western Nepal. At the time of the 1991 Nepal census it had a population of 3,201 and had 604 houses in the town. Now, it is a part (Ward No.17) of Nepalgunj sub-metropolitan city.
