= Kailash Nath Kasudhan =

Nepali politician

Member of Parliament, Pratinidhi Sabha
- In office 28 April 2006 – 16 January 2008
- Preceded by: Himself (2002)
- Succeeded by: Sarbadev Ojha (as Member of the Constituent Assembly)
- Constituency: Banke 3
- In office 23 June 1999 – 22 May 2002
- Preceded by: Fateh Singh Tharu
- Succeeded by: Himself (2006)
- Constituency: Banke 3

Personal details
- Party: Nepali Congress

Kailash Nath Kasudhan (Nepali: कैलाश नाथ कासुधन) is a Nepalese politician. He was elected to the Pratinidhi Sabha in the 1999 election on behalf of the Nepali Congress.
