= Narainapur Rural Municipality =

Narainapur नारायणपुर
- Village development committee
- Location in Lumbini Province Narainapur (Nepal)
- Coordinates: 27.93°N 81.86°E
- Country: Nepal
- Zone: Bheri Zone
- District: Banke District

Population (1991)
  - Total: 3,870
- Time zone: UTC+5:45 (Nepal Time)
- Website: narainapurmun.gov.np

Narainapur is a town in Banke District in the Bheri Zone of south-western Nepal. At the time of the 1991 Nepal census it had a population of 3,870 and had 692 houses in the town.

== Government ==
The purpose of Village Development Committees like Narainapur is to organise village people structurally at a local level and creating a partnership between the community and the public sector for improved service delivery system. A VDC has a status as an autonomous institution and authority for interacting with the more centralised institutions of governance in Nepal. In doing so, the VDC gives village people an element of control and responsibility in development, and also ensures proper utilization and distribution of state funds and a greater interaction between government officials, NGOs and agencies. The village development committees within a given area will discuss education, water supply, basic health, sanitation and income and will also monitor and record progress which is displayed in census data.

In VDCs there is one elected chief, usually elected with over an 80% majority. From each ward, there is also a chief that is elected along with these there are also four members elected or nominated.

== Demographics ==
At the time of the 2011 Nepal census, Narainapur Rural Municipality had a population of 35,042. Of these, 47.6% spoke Awadhi, 45.0% Urdu, 3.6% Nepali, 1.2% Maithili, 1.2% Doteli, 0.7% Tharu, 0.2% Magar, 0.1% Newar, 0.1% Hindi and 0.3% other languages as their first language.

In terms of ethnicity/caste, 45.2% were Musalman, 16.0% Yadav, 3.7% Chamar/Harijan/Ram, 3.3% Dusadh/Pasawan/Pasi, 3.3% Koiri/Kushwaha, 2.9% Tharu, 2.4% Dhobi, 2.3% Terai Brahmin, 2.1% Hajam/Thakur and 18.8% others.

In terms of religion, 54.5% were Hindu, 45.0% Muslim, 0.3% Christian, 0.1% Buddhist and 0.1% others.
