= Kishore Singh Rathore =

Nepali politician

Honourable Kishore Singh Rathore MP
- किशोर सिंह राठोर

Deputy General Secretary of Nepali Congress
- In office 17 December 2021 – 14 January 2026
- President: Sher Bahadur Deuba
- Preceded by: Prakash Sharan Mahat

Member of Parliament, Pratinidhi Sabha
- In office 22 December 2022 – 12 September 2025
- Preceded by: Nanda Lal Roka Chhetri
- Succeeded by: Khagendra Sunar
- Constituency: Banke 3
- In office 4 March 2018 – 18 September 2022
- Constituency: Party list (Nepali Congress)

Personal details
- Born: 27 April 1969 (age 57) Salyan, Karnali Province, Nepal
- Party: Nepali Congress
- Parents: Mahendra Bahadur Singh (father); Indira Singh (mother)
- Education: Tribhuwan University

Kishore Singh Rathore (born 27 April 1969) is a Nepali politician and Deputy general secretary of Nepali Congress. Rathore was also a member of the Pratinidhi Sabha elected under the proportional representation system from Nepali Congress filling the reserved seat for Khas-Arya group, later serving from the constituency Banke 3. He is also a member of the House Finance Committee. In the shadow cabinet of Nepali Congress, he was the coordinator of the Ministry of Sports and Youth Affairs.

== Political career ==
He joined politics as a student in 1984, from Nepal Student Union, the student wing of Nepali Congress. He became the Free Student Union secretary and then Chairman while he was in Trichandra College. He went on to become secretary of Nepal Student Union, and then chairman for six years. He was also the founding chair of FSU Forum. Later, he went on to become central member of Nepali Congress.

He was a candidate from Bardiya-4 for Nepali Congress, in the Second constituent assembly election of 2013.

== Personal life ==
He was born on 27 April 1969 to Mahendra Bahadur Singh and Indira Singh in Wadagaun, Salyan. His family later moved to the Terai and currently lives in Rajapur, Bardiya. He has a son and a daughter.
