= Radhapur, Nepal =

Radhapur राधापुर
- City
- Location in Lumbini Province Radhapur (Nepal)
- Coordinates: 28.07°N 81.53°E
- Country: Nepal
- Province: Lumbini Province
- District: Banke District

Population (1991)
  - Total: 5,228
- Time zone: UTC+5:45 (Nepal Time)

Radhapur is a Village Development Committee in Banke District in Lumbini Province of south-western Nepal. At the time of the 1991 Nepal census it had a population of 5,228 and had 915 houses in the town.
