= Sushil Koirala =

Prime Minister of Nepal from 2014 to 2015

- सुशील कोइराला
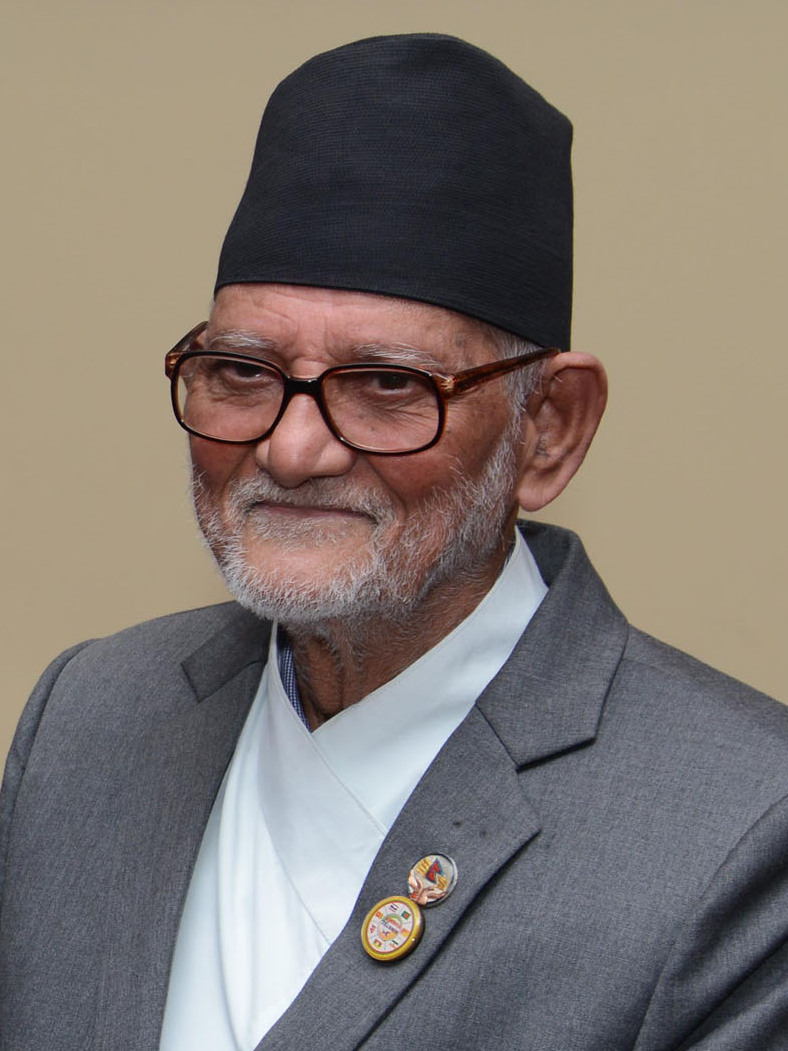
- Koirala in 2014

Prime Minister of Nepal
- In office 11 February 2014 – 11 October 2015
- President: Ram Baran Yadav
- Deputy: Bam Dev Gautam; Prakash Man Singh
- Preceded by: Khil Raj Regmi (Interim)
- Succeeded by: K. P. Sharma Oli

Leader of the Opposition
- In office 11 October 2015 – 9 February 2016
- Prime Minister: K. P. Sharma Oli
- Preceded by: Pushpa Kamal Dahal
- Succeeded by: Sher Bahadur Deuba

President of the Nepali Congress
- In office 22 September 2010 – 9 February 2016
- Preceded by: Girija Prasad Koirala
- Succeeded by: Sher Bahadur Deuba

Member of the Constituent Assembly / Legislature Parliament
- In office 21 January 2014 – 9 February 2016
- Preceded by: Sarbadev Ojha
- Succeeded by: Nanda Lal Roka Chhetri (as Member of Parliament)
- Constituency: Banke 3

Member of the House of Representatives
- In office 28 April 2006 – 16 January 2008
- Preceded by: Himself (2002)
- Succeeded by: Mohammad Ishtiyaq Rayi (as Member of the Constituent Assembly)
- Constituency: Banke 2
- In office 23 June 1999 – 22 May 2002
- Preceded by: Shanti SJB Rana
- Succeeded by: Himself (2006)
- Constituency: Banke 2
- In office 20 June 1991 – 11 July 1994
- Preceded by: Constituency created
- Succeeded by: Shanti SJB Rana
- Constituency: Banke 2

Personal details
- Born: 12 August 1939 Biratnagar, Kingdom of Nepal
- Died: 9 February 2016 (aged 76) Kathmandu, Nepal
- Party: Nepali Congress
- Parent(s): Bodh Prasad Koirala (father); Kumudini Koirala (mother)
- Nickname: Sushil Da (Nepali: सुशील दा)

Sushil Prasad Koirala (Nepali: सुशीलप्रसाद कोइराला; 12 August 1939 – 9 February 2016) was a Nepalese politician and the Prime Minister of Nepal from 11 February 2014 to 10 October 2015. He was also President of the Nepali Congress from 2010 to 2016, having earlier served in various capacities in the party. He is also known as the "Father of Constitution" due to his major role in promulgation of The Constitution of Nepal.

== Early life ==
Koirala was born to Bodh Prasad and Kumudini Koirala on 12 August 1939 in Biratnagar, the then second-largest city of Nepal. A member of the politically prominent Koirala family, he was the first cousin (his mother was the sister of Krishna Prasad Koirala's second wife) of former prime ministers Bishweshwar Prasad Koirala and Girija Prasad Koirala, as well as a distant relative of their elder half-brother Matrika Prasad Koirala, another former prime minister.

== Political career ==
Koirala entered politics in 1954 inspired by the social-democratic ideals of the Nepali Congress. In 1958, he keenly participated in Bhadra Abagya Aandalon (Civil Disobedience Movement) launched by the Nepali Congress. In 1959, he actively involved himself in the party's objective of carrying out the democratic elections. The election saw Bishweshwar Prasad Koirala become the first elected prime minister of the country. However, King Mahendra planned and executed a coup in December 1960 and expelled the elected government led by B.P. Koirala. This resulted in the exile of several members of the Nepali Congress to India, which included Sushil Koirala. He remained in political exile in India for 16 years following the royal takeover of 1960. Koirala also spent three years in Indian prisons for his involvement in a plane hijacking in 1973. While in exile, Koirala was the editor of Tarun in Varanasi, the official party publication. He has been a member of the Central Working Committee of the party since 1979 and was appointed General Secretary of the party in 1996 and Vice President in 1998.

In 2001, he lost the leadership ballot for Nepali Congress' parliamentary party to former prime minister Sher Bahadur Deuba. Koirala was appointed acting president of the party in 2008 by president Girija Prasad Koirala. The 12th general convention of the Nepali Congress, on 22 September 2010, elected him party president.

The Nepali Congress emerged as the largest party in the 2013 Constituent Assembly elections under Koirala's leadership. He was elected leader of the Congress' parliamentary party securing 105 out of 194 votes against former prime minister Deuba's 89 votes, and on 10 February 2014, he was nominated as prime minister by the constituent assembly. During his tenure as prime minister, his government was criticized for its slow aid response to the April 2015 Nepal earthquake. A historic agreement among the country's four major political parties was also made that year, which paved the way for the promulgation of a new constitution. Due his major role, he is also known as the "Father of the Constitution" Honouring a pledge to stand down as prime minister once the new constitution came into effect, Koirala resigned on 10 October 2015. He sought re-election but was defeated by K. P. Sharma Oli, leader of Congress' former coalition partners, the CPN (UML).

== Electoral history ==
Koirala was elected to the Pratinidhi Sabha from the Banke–2 constituency in 1991 and 1999, while he was defeated in 1994. He lost in the 2008 Constituent Assembly election from Banke–3, finishing third behind the candidates of the MJFN and the UCPN (Maoist). He contested and won from both Banke–3 and Chitwan–4 in the 2013 Constituent Assembly election. He later relinquished the Chitwan–4 seat and represented Banke–3 in the 2nd Constituent Assembly.

Only the top two candidates are shown below.

1991 Pratinidhi Sabha Election

Banke–2

Party	Candidate	Votes	Status
Nepali Congress	Sushil Koirala	14,409	Elected
CPN (UML)	–	5,926	Lost
Result		Congress win	

1994 Pratinidhi Sabha Election

Banke–2

Party	Candidate	Votes	Status
RPP	Shanti Shamsher Rana	15,711	Elected
Congress	Sushil Koirala	10,222	Lost
Result		RPP gain from Congress	

1999 Pratinidhi Sabha Election

Banke–2

Party	Candidate	Votes	Status
Congress	Sushil Koirala	15,256	Elected
CPN (ML)	Rijwan Ahammad Sah	6,185	Lost
Result		Congress gain from RPP	

2008 Constituent Assembly Election

Banke–3

Party	Candidate	Votes	Status
MJF – Nepal	Sarbadev Prasad Ojha	14,900	Elected
UCPN (Maoist)	Parma Nanda Kurmi	6,970	Lost
Congress	Sushil Koirala	5,969	Lost
Result		MJFN gain from Congress	

2013 Constituent Assembly Elections

Banke–3

Party	Candidate	Votes	Status
Congress	Sushil Koirala	10,753	Elected
RPP – Nepal	Dhawal Shumsher Rana	8,809	Lost
Result		Congress gain from MJFN	

Chitwan–4

Party	Candidate	Votes	Status
Congress	Sushil Koirala	20,760	Elected
UCPN (Maoist)	Chitra Bahadur Shrestha	10,739	Lost
Result		Congress gain from UCPN(M)	

2015 Parliamentary Prime Minister Election

Party	Candidate	Votes	Status
CPN (UML)	KP Sharma Oli	338	Elected
Congress	Sushil Koirala	249	Lost
Result		CPN (UML) gain from Congress	

== Personal life ==
Koirala remained unmarried throughout his life and was known to live a simple life. He was fondly known among his friends and supporters as 'Sushil daa'. Although Koirala was believed to have completed formal education with an Intermediate of Commerce (I. Comm.) degree from a college in India according to his sister-in-law, he refuted those claims and maintained to have only received informal education.

=== Illness and death ===
A heavy smoker, Koirala was diagnosed with tongue cancer in 2006 and lung cancer in June 2014. He died on 10 February 2016 at 12:50 AM of pneumonia in Kathmandu, at the age of 76.

== Bibliography ==
- Koirala, Sushil (2017). Dinesh Bhattarai (ed.). Nepal's Foreign Policy: From Expediency to Pragmatism. B.P. Koirala Memorial Trust.

== See also ==
- Sushil Koirala Memorial Foundation
- Koirala cabinet, 2013

Party political offices
Preceded by Girija Prasad Koirala	President of the Nepali Congress; 22 September 2010 – 9 February 2016	Succeeded by Sher Bahadur Deuba
Political offices
Preceded by Khil Raj Regmi; Acting	Prime Minister of Nepal; 11 February 2014 – 10 October 2015	Succeeded by KP Sharma Oli
Diplomatic posts
Preceded by Mohammed Nasheed	Host leader of the SAARC summit 26–27 November 2014	Succeeded by TBA
