= Mahendra Multiple Campus, Nepalgunj =

Public institution in Nepalgunj, Nepal

- Type: Public co-educational
- Established: 2018 B.S.
- Affiliations: Tribhuvan University
- Campus Chief: Dr. Lalmani Acharya
- Students: 5500
- Location: (Nepal) Nepalgunj, Banke District, Nepal
- Website: mahemc.tu.edu.np

Mahendra Multiple Campus, Nepalgunj (Nepali: महेन्द्र बहुमुखी क्याम्पस, नेपालगन्ज) is a public co-educational institution located in Nepalgunj city in western Nepal. It is one of the campuses affiliated to the Tribhuvan University. It is named after the King Mahendra.

The campus was established in 2014 BS (1957–1958) as Narayan Inter College. It was renamed to Mahendra Degree College in 2018 BS and finally in 2028 BS, it was renamed to Mahendra Multiple Campus in 2028 BS based on the New Education Planning.

== Infrastructures ==
The campus has 17 Bighas of land. The infrastructures of the campus is considered to be in deteriorated state.

There are about 109 teachers and 65 administrative staffs in the campus.
