= Khagendra Sunar =

Nepalese politician

Honourable Khagendra Sunar
- खगेन्द्र सुनार

Member of Parliament, Pratinidhi Sabha
- Incumbent
- Assumed office 26 March 2026
- Preceded by: Kishore Singh Rathore
- Constituency: Banke 3

Personal details
- Born: 16 May 1990 (age 36) Narayan Municipality, Dailekh, Nepal
- Citizenship: Nepalese
- Party: Rastriya Swatantra Party (2025 – present)
- Other political affiliations: Nepali Congress; Hamro Party Nepal
- Parents: Kaman Singh Sunar (father); Devi Sara Sunarni (mother)
- Profession: Politician

Khagendra Sunar (Nepali: खगेन्द्र सुनार) is a Nepalese social activist and politician serving as a member of parliament from the Rastriya Swatantra Party. He is a member of the 7th Pratinidhi Sabha elected from Banke 3 constituency in 2026 Nepalese General Election securing 29,551 votes and defeating his closest contender Suman Mall of the CPN (UML).

== Early and personal life ==
Khagendra Sunar was born in Narayan Municipality, Dailekh on 16 May 1990. He was born into a Dalit family to Kaman Singh Sunar and Devi Sara Sunarni.

He graduated in political science and history from Ratna Rajya Laxmi Campus in Kathmandu. Professionally, he entered journalism and worked as a radio host for two media outlets.

== Activism ==
His activism started by protesting at the District Administration Office in Rukum West after six youths were killed in an incident of caste-related community violence. He came to media attention by protesting at Maitighar Mandala, chaining his legs and demanding rights for Dalits, specially inter-caste married couples. He also tried to enterd the Federal Parilament Building demanding legal action against then Home Affairs Minister, Ramesh Lekhak but was arrested by Nepal Police.

== Politics ==
He was elected to the Nepali Congress general committee from Dailekh in 2021. In November 2025, he formed a political party under his leadership named Hamro Party Nepal. Later the party merged into Rastriya Swatantra Party on 4 January 2026 and Sunar was appointed as central committee member of Rastriya Swatantra Party.

== Electoral performance ==
Election	Year	Constituency	Contested for	Political party	Result	Votes	% of votes	Ref.
Nepal general election	2026	Banke 3	Pratinidhi Sabha member	Rastriya Swatantra Party	Won	29,551	42.06%	
