= Duduwa Rural Municipality =

Duduwa Rural Municipality डुडुवा गाउँपालिका
- Gaunpalika
- Location in Lumbini Province Duduwa Rural Municipality (Nepal)
- Coordinates: 28.044203°N 81.697494°E
- Country: Nepal
- Province: Lumbini Province
- District: Banke District

Area
  - Total: 91.1 km^{2} (35.2 sq mi)

Population
  - Total: 37,533
  - Density: 412/km^{2} (1,070/sq mi)
- Time zone: UTC+5:45 (Nepal Time)
- Website: https://duduwamun.gov.np/

Duduwa Rural Municipality (Nepali: डुडुवा गाउँपालिका) is a Gaunpalika in Banke District in Lumbini Province of Nepal. On 12 March 2017, the government of Nepal implemented a new local administrative structure, with the implementation of the new local administrative structure, VDCs have been replaced with municipal and Village Councils. Duduwa is one of these 753 local units.

== Demographics ==
At the time of the 2011 Nepal census, Duduwa Rural Municipality had a population of 37,533. Of these, 54.4% spoke Awadhi, 29.6% Urdu, 12.5% Nepali, 1.4% Maithili, 1.2% Tharu, 0.5% Magar, 0.3% Doteli and 0.1% Newar as their first language.

In terms of ethnicity/caste, 29.7% were Musalman, 12.9% Yadav, 7.7% Kurmi, 6.8% Chhetri, 4.7% Tharu, 4.0% other Dalit, 3.1% other Terai, 2.9% Kori, 2.6% Chamar/Harijan/Ram and 25.6% others.

In terms of religion, 69.9% were Hindu, 29.6% Muslim, 0.4% Christian and 0.1% Buddhist.
