= Raniyapur =

Raniyapur रानियापुर
- Village development committee
- Location in Lumbini Province Raniyapur (Nepal)
- Coordinates: 28.17°N 81.58°E
- Country: Nepal
- Province: Lumbini Province
- District: Banke District

Population (1991)
  - Total: 3,949
- Time zone: UTC+5:45 (Nepal Time)

Raniyapur is a village development committee in Banke District in Lumbini Province of south-western Nepal. At the time of the 1991 Nepal census it had a population of 3,949 and had 723 houses in the town.
