= Udaipur (disambiguation) =

Udaipur is a major city in Rajasthan, India.

Udaipur may also refer to:

- Udaipur Division, an administrative division of the Rajasthan state in India centred in the city
  - Udaipur district, a district in the Rajasthan state of India
  - Udaipur Kingdom later Udaipur State, also known as Mewar, a Rajput kingdom and later princely state with its capital at the Udaipur city
  - Udaipur City railway station
  - Udaipur City Bus Depot
  - Udaipur (horse), a Thoroughbred racehorse
- Udaipur, Madhya Pradesh, a town and historic site in central India
- Chhota Udaipur, a municipality in the Vadodara district of Gujarat, India
- Udaipur, a town in the Lahaul and Spiti of Himachal Pradesh, India
- Udaipur, Tripura, a town in the South Tripura district of Tripura, India
  - Udaipur railway station

== See also ==
- Udayapur (disambiguation)
- Mewar (disambiguation), region of India containing the city
