= Piparhawa =

Piparhawa पिपरहवा
- Village development committee
- Location in Lumbini Province Piparhawa (Nepal)
- Coordinates: 28.02°N 81.62°E
- Country: Nepal
- Province: Lumbini Province
- District: Banke District

Population (1991)
  - Total: 2,862
- Time zone: UTC+5:45 (Nepal Time)

Piparhawa is a village development committee in Banke District in Lumbini Province of south-western Nepal. At the time of the 1991 Nepal census it had a population of 2,862 and had 247 houses in the village. Now, it is a part of Nepalgunj sub-metropolitan city.
