= Phatepur =

Phattepur फत्तेपुर
- Village development committee
- Location in Lumbini Province Phattepur (Nepal)
- Coordinates: 28.03°N 81.77°E
- Country: Nepal
- Province: Lumbini Province
- District: Banke District

Population (1991)
  - Total: 10,793
- Time zone: UTC+5:45 (Nepal Time)

Phattepur is a village development committee in Banke District in Lumbini Province of south-western Nepal. At the time of the 1991 Nepal census it had a population of 10,793 and had 1586 houses in the town.
