= Mewar (disambiguation) =

Mewar is a region in Rajasthan, India.

Mewar may also refer to:

- Kingdom of Mewar, a Kingdom in Rajputana region of India, before the British Raj
- Arvind Singh Mewar (born 1944), the 76th custodian of the Mewar dynasty
- Mahendra Singh Mewar (born 1941), Indian politician

== See also ==
- Udaipur (disambiguation), alternative name for the region
- Mewari, an Indic language spoken in the region
- Marwar, a different region of Rajasthan
  - Marwari (disambiguation)
- Mewar Residency, a political office for the state during the British Raj
