= Khajura Rural Municipality =

Khajura Rural Municipality खजुरा गाउँपालिका Khajura Bajaar
- Municipality
- खजुरा गाउँपालिका
- Nickname: खजुरा बजार
- Motto(s): सम्बृद्द खजुरा, हाम्रो चाहना
- Location in Lumbini Province Khajura Rural Municipality (Nepal)
- Coordinates: 28°12′N 81°41′E
- Country: Nepal
- Province: Lumbini Province
- District: Banke District
- Established: 10 March 2017

Government
  - Type: rural council
  - Chairperson: Dambar Bahadur BK (Tuphan)
  - Deputy-Chairperson: Manju Malla

Population (2011)
  - Total: 50,961
  - Rank: 3rd (Nepal)
- Time zone: UTC+5:45 (Nepal Time)
- Area code: 081-560XXX
- Website: http://www.khajuramun.gov.np/

Khajura Rural Municipality also known as Khajura Bajaar is a municipality in Banke District in the Bheri Zone in mid-western Nepal. The municipality was established on 10 March 2017 by merging the existing six Village Development Committees i.e. Radhapur, Sitapur, Bageshwari, Sonpur, Udharapur, Raniyapur. The town is in Nepalganj-Gulariya highway and one of the fastest developing places in Nepal. A neighboring city Nepalgunj is on east(8 km), and further 6 km is the Indian border. In fact it is a growing city in the western region of Nepal.

It is accessible by air (Nepalgunj Airport) and by road (559 km west of Kathmandu).

== Khajura Rural Municipality ==
Khajura will become the third municipality in the Banke District, with the first being Nepalgunj and second being Kohalpur.

As a municipality, Khajura Bajaar will assume greater local government autonomy and greater financial resources as part of the central governments' effort to promote decentralized power.

The municipality status of Kohalpur has been repeatedly stalled due to the failure to ratify the national constitution. A fourth deadline to ratify the constitution was missed on 27 May 2012.

== Geography ==
Khajura Bajaar is located in the Banke District in the Mid-West Region of Nepal (Therai region), with a total area of 2816.6 hectares. The climate is subtropical and the temperature varies between a maximum of 46 °C and minimum of -2 °C.

== Demographics ==
At the time of the 2011 Nepal census, Khajura Rural Municipality had a population of 50,990. Of these, 55.2% spoke Nepali, 26.3% Urdu, 13.2% Awadhi, 2.5% Tharu, 1.6% Magar, 0.4% Newar, 0.3% Maithili, 0.2% Gurung and 0.3% other languages as their first language.

In terms of ethnicity/caste, 26.7% were Musalman, 15.6% Chhetri, 11.8% Magar, 9.9% Kami, 6.9% Hill Brahmin, 4.1% Yadav, 4.0% Thakuri, 3.6% Tharu, 2.4% Gurung and 15.0% others.

In terms of religion, 68.1% were Hindu, 26.7% Muslim, 2.8% Buddhist and 2.4% Christian.

== Infrastructure and Basic Services ==
- Nepal Cancer Hospital
