= Sitapur, Banke =

Sitapur, Banke सितापुर
- Village development committee
- Location in Lumbini Province Sitapur, Banke (Nepal)
- Coordinates: 28.10°N 81.54°E
- Country: Nepal
- Province: Lumbini Province
- District: Banke District

Population (1991)
  - Total: 4,372
- Time zone: UTC+5:45 (Nepal Time)

Sitapur is a village development committee in Banke District in Lumbini Province of south-western Nepal. At the time of the 1991 Nepal census it had a population of 4,372 and had 780 houses in the town.
