= Puraini =

Puraini पुरैनी
- Village development committee
- Location in Lumbini Province Puraini (Nepal)
- Coordinates: 28.06°N 81.67°E
- Country: Nepal
- Province: Lumbini Province
- District: Banke District

Population (1991)
  - Total: 2,636
- Time zone: UTC+5:45 (Nepal Time)

Puraini is a village development committee in Banke District in Lumbini Province of south-western Nepal. At the time of the 1991 Nepal census it had a population of 2636 and had 512 houses in the village. Now, it is a part of Nepalgunj sub-metropolitan city.
