= Puraina =

Puraina पुरैना
- Village development committee
- Location in Lumbini Province Puraina (Nepal)
- Coordinates: 28.04°N 81.66°E
- Country: Nepal
- Province: Lumbini Province
- District: Banke District
- Time zone: UTC+5:45 (Nepal Time)

Puraina is a village development committee in Banke District in Lumbini Province of south-western Nepal. Now, it is part of Nepalgunj sub-metropolitan city.
