= Udayapur, Banke =

Coordinates: 28°2′N 81°38′E

Udayapur उदयपुर
- Village Development Committee
- Location in Lumbini Province Udayapur (Nepal)
- Country: Nepal
- Province: Lumbini Province
- District: Banke District

Population (1991)
  - Total: 2,301
- Time zone: UTC+5:45 (NST)

Udayapur is a Village Development Committee in Banke District in Lumbini Province of south-western Nepal. At the time of the 1991 Nepal census it had a population of 2,301 and had 397 houses in the village. Two government owned primary schools are situated here along with one among 10 Health Posts in district and a police station. Now, it is a part of Nepalgunj sub-metropolitan city.
