= Bageshwari, Banke =

Khajura खजुरा
- Gaunpalika
- Location in Lumbini Province Khajura (Nepal)
- Coordinates: 28.14°N 81.60°E
- Country: Nepal
- Zone: Bheri Zone
- District: Banke District

Population (1991)
  - Total: 9,740
  - Religions: Hindu
- Time zone: UTC+5:45 (Nepal Time)

Bageshwari is a town in Banke District in the Bheri Zone of south-western Nepal. At the time of the 1991 Nepal census it had a population of 9,740 and had 1711 houses in the town.
