= Udayapur, Kapilvastu =

Udayapur उदयपुर
- Village
- Location in Nepal
- Coordinates: 27.57°N 82.90°E
- Country: Nepal
- Zone: Lumbini Zone
- District: Kapilvastu District

Population (1991)
  - Total: 2,814
- Time zone: UTC+5:45 (Nepal Time)

Udayapur is a village in Kapilvastu District of the Lumbini Province of southern Nepal. At the time of the 1991 Nepal census it had a population of 2814 people living in 478 individual households.

Formerly, Udayapur was a village development committee (VDC), which were local-level administrative units. In 2017, the government of Nepal restructured local government in line with the 2015 constitution and VDCs were discontinued.
