= Belbhar =

Village development committee in Bheri Zone, Nepal

Belbhar बेलभार
- Village development committee
- Location in Lumbini Province Belbhar (Nepal)
- Coordinates: 28°16′N 81°23′E
- Country: Nepal
- Zone: Bheri Zone
- District: Banke District

Population (1991)
  - Total: 3,583
  - Religions: Hindu
- Time zone: UTC+5:45 (Nepal Time)

Belbhar is a town in Banke District in the Bheri Zone of south-western Nepal. At the time of the 1991 Nepal census it had a population of 3,583 and had 697 houses in the town.

== Government ==
The purpose of Village Development Committees (VDCs) is to organise village people structurally at a local level and creating a partnership between the community and the public sector for improved service delivery system. A VDC has a status as an autonomous institution and authority for interacting with the more centralised institutions of governance in Nepal. In doing so, the VDC gives village people an element of control and responsibility in development, and also ensures proper utilization and distribution of state funds and a greater interaction between government officials, NGOs and agencies. The village development committees within a given area will discuss education, water supply, basic health, sanitation and income and will also monitor and record progress which is displayed in census data.

In VDCs there is one elected chief, usually elected with over an 80% majority. From each ward, there is also a chief that is elected along with these there are also four members elected or nominated.
