= Rapti-Sonari Rural Municipality =

Gaunpalika in Lumbini Province, Nepal

Rapti-Sonari Rural Municipality राप्तिसोनारी गाउँपालिका
- Gaunpalika
- Location in Lumbini Province Rapti-Sonari Rural Municipality (Nepal)
- Coordinates: 28.044370°N 81.955280°E
- Country: Nepal
- Province: Lumbini Province
- District: Banke District

Area
  - Total: 1,042 km^{2} (402 sq mi)
  - Rank: 9th (Nepal)

Population
  - Total: 60,925
  - Rank: 1st (Nepal)
  - Density: 58.47/km^{2} (151.4/sq mi)
- Time zone: UTC+5:45 (Nepal Time)
- Website: http://raptisonarimun.gov.np/

Rapti-Sonari Rural Municipality (Nepali :राप्तिसोनारी गाउँपालिका) is a Gaunpalika in Banke District in Lumbini Province of Nepal. On 12 March 2017, the government of Nepal implemented a new local administrative structure. With the implementation of the new structure, VDCs have been replaced with municipal and Village Councils. Rapti-Sonari is one of these 753 local units.

== Demographics ==
At the time of the 2011 Nepal census, Rapti-Sonari Rural Municipality had a population of 60,925. Of these, 48.3% spoke Tharu, 41.1% Nepali, 4.7% Awadhi, 4.2% Urdu, 1.1% Magar, 0.2% Maithili, 0.1% Hindi, 0.1% Doteli and 0.2% other languages as their first language.

In terms of ethnicity/caste, 49.2% were Tharu, 21.3% Chhetri, 6.8% Magar, 4.4% Kami, 4.4% Musalman, 1.9% Kumal, 1.7% Damai/Dholi, 1.7% Hill Brahmin, 1.6% Yadav and 7.0% others.

In terms of religion, 94.4% were Hindu, 4.3% Muslim, 0.9% Christian and 0.4% Buddhist.
