= Udaypur Dhursi =

Coordinates: 27°5′N 84°51′E

Ghurmi घुर्मी
- Village development committee
- Interactive map of Ghurmi
- Country: Nepal
- Zone: Narayani Zone
- District: Parsa District

Population (2011)
  - Total: 7,163
- Time zone: UTC+5:45 (Nepal Time)

Udayapur Ghurmi is a village development committee in Parsa District in the Narayani Zone of southern Nepal. At the time of the 2011 Nepal census it had a population of 7,163 people living in 1,085 individual households.
