= Baijanath Rural Municipality =

Baijanath Rural Municipality वैजनाथ गाउँपालिका
- Gaunpalika
- Location in Lumbini Province Baijanath Rural Municipality (Nepal)
- Coordinates: 28.203732°N 81.624986°E
- Country: Nepal
- Province: Lumbini Province
- District: Banke District

Area
  - Total: 142 km^{2} (55 sq mi)

Population
  - Total: 54,987
  - Rank: 2nd (Nepal)
  - Density: 387/km^{2} (1,000/sq mi)
- Time zone: UTC+5:45 (Nepal Time)
- Website: https://baijanathmun.gov.np/

Baijanath Rural Municipality (Nepali: वैजनाथ गाउँपालिका) is a Gaunpalika in Banke District in Lumbini Province of Nepal. On 12 March 2017, the government of Nepal implemented a new local administrative structure, with the implementation of the new local administrative structure, VDCs have been replaced with municipal and Village Councils. Baijanath is one of these 753 local units.

== Demographics ==
At the time of the 2011 Nepal census, Baijanath Rural Municipality had a population of 54,987. Of these, 60.0% spoke Nepali, 35.5% Tharu, 2.0% Magar, 1.5% Awadhi, 0.3% Urdu, 0.2% Hindi, 0.1% Maithili, 0.1% Doteli and 0.3% other languages as their first language.

In terms of ethnicity/caste, 36.6% were Tharu, 27.3% Chhetri, 9.7% Kami, 7.8% Magar, 5.9% Thakuri, 4.7% Hill Brahmin, 3.1% Damai/Dholi, 1.1% Sanyasi/Dasnami, 0.8% Gurung and 3.0% others.

In terms of religion, 94.8% were Hindu, 2.4% Buddhist, 2.3% Christian and 0.5% Muslim.
