= Holiya, Nepal =

Holiya होलिया
- Village development committee
- Location in Lumbini Province Holiya (Nepal)
- Coordinates: 27.98°N 81.74°E
- Country: Nepal
- Province: Lumbini Province
- District: Banke District

Population (1991)
  - Total: 4,558
- Time zone: UTC+5:45 (Nepal Time)

Holiya is a town in the Banke District in Lumbini Province of southwestern Nepal. At the time of the 1991 Nepal census, it had a population of 4,558, and there were 797 houses in the town.

== Government ==
The purpose of Village Development Committees is to organise village people structurally at a local level and to create a partnership between the community and the public sector for an improved service delivery system. A VDC has status as an autonomous institution and has authority for interacting with the more centralised institutions of governance in Nepal. Therefore, the VDC gives village people an element of control and responsibility in development. It also ensures proper utilization and distribution of state funds and a greater interaction between government officials, NGOs, and other agencies. The village development committees within a given area discuss education, water supply, basic health, sanitation, and income. They also monitor and record progress, which is displayed in census data.

In VDCs there is one elected chief, usually elected by at least an 80% majority. From each ward, there is also an elected chief and along four members either elected or nominated.
