= Nepalgunj =

Nepalgunj नेपालगञ्ज
- Sub-Metropolitan City
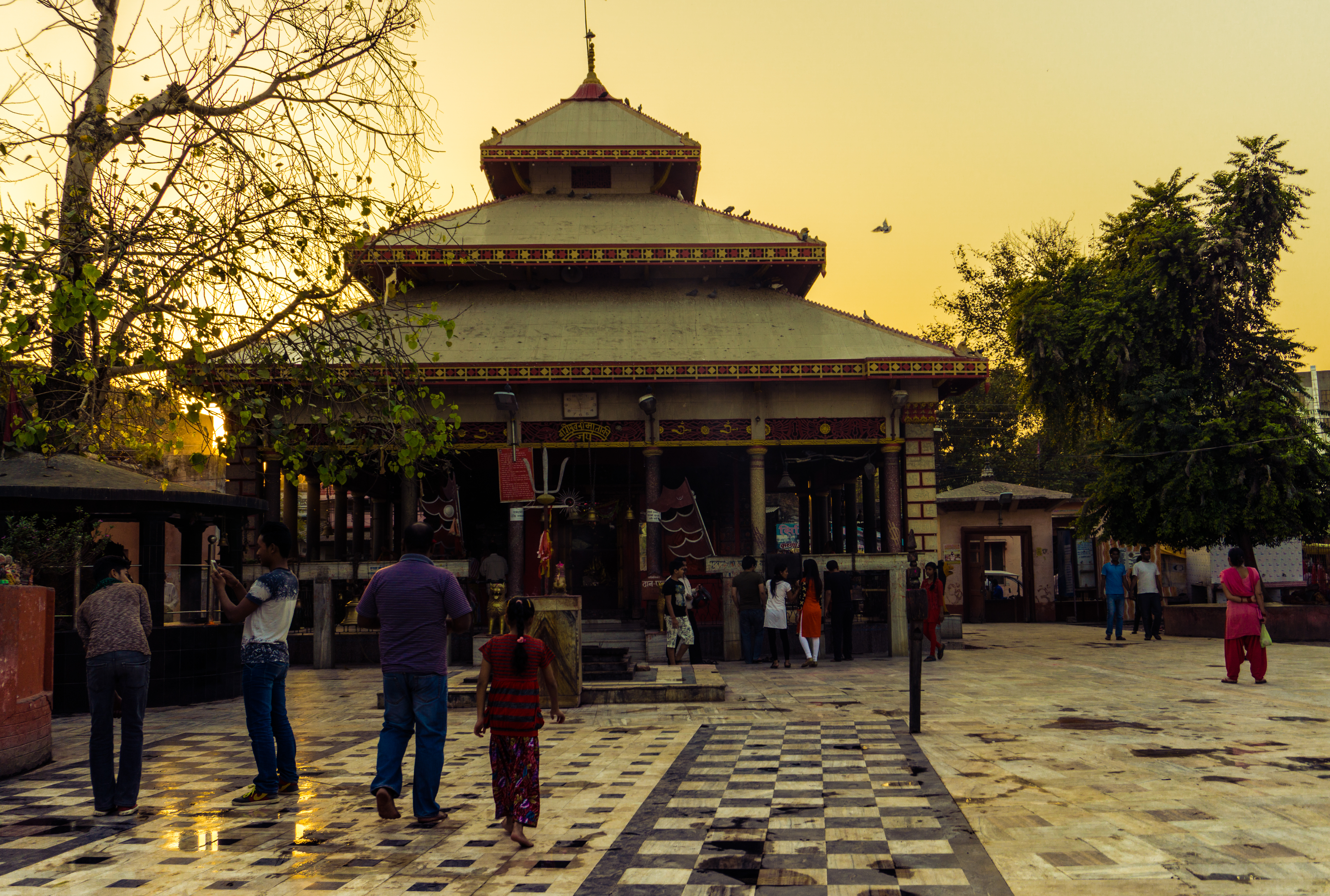
- Bageshwori Temple

- Location within Lumbini Province Location within Nepal
- Coordinates: 28°03′N 81°37′E
- Country: Nepal
- Province: Lumbini
- District: Banke

Government
  - Type: Mayor–council
  - Mayor: Prashant Bista (Congress)
  - Deputy Mayor: Kamruddin Rayi (PSP-N)
  - Executive Officer: Shiva Prasad Rijal

Area
  - Total: 85.94 km^{2} (33.18 sq mi)
- Elevation: 150 m (490 ft)

Population (2021)
  - Total: 166,258
  - Rank: 16th
  - Density: 1,616.84/km^{2} (4,187.6/sq mi)
- Time zone: UTC+5:45 (NST)
- Area code: 081
- Website: www.nepalgunjmun.gov.np

Nepalgunj (Nepali: नेपालगञ्ज; [neˈpalɡʌnd͡z]), also spelled Nepalganj, is a Sub-Metropolitan City in Banke District, Nepal. It lies on the Terai plains near the southern border with Bahraich district in Uttar Pradesh, India. Nepalgunj is 153 kilometers south-west of Ghorahi and 16 km south of Kohalpur. Former Village Development Committee: Udayapur, Bhawaniyapur, Piprahawa, Jaispur, Paraspur, Indrapur, Khaskarkado, Basudevpur, Manikapur and Puraina were added to territory in order to make it Sub metropolitan city on 2071 Paush 28 and later Puraini was also added in list on 2072 Paush 21. Further, while restructuring of local levels nationwide, ward no. 23 (former Indrapur VDC) was taken out to Janaki Rural Municipality and ward no. 7 of Hirminiya VDC was added to Nepalgunj.

== Demographics ==
At the time of the 2011 Nepal census, Nepalgunj Sub-Metropolitan City had a population of 141,241. Of these, 33.7% spoke Nepali, 30.7% Awadhi, 27.2% Urdu, 2.1% Hindi, 1.8% Tharu, 1.4% Maithili, 1.0% Newar, 0.6% Magar, 0.3% Doteli and 1.2% other languages as their first language.

In terms of ethnicity/caste, 28.2% were Musalman, 10.7% Chhetri, 8.6% Hill Brahmin, 4.0% Thakuri, 3.7% Magar, 3.5% Yadav, 3.2% Tharu, 3.0% Newar, 3.0% Kathabaniyan and 32.1% others.

In terms of religion, 70.0% were Hindu, 27.8% Muslim, 1.1% Buddhist, 0.8% Christian, 0.1% Kirati and 0.2% others.

== Culture ==
Nepalgunj has a diverse culture with people from different faiths living within mixed communities. Hinduism and Buddhism are two major religions in the city, with Hindus comprising the larger percentage of the population. The city also has followers of other religions like Islam, Sikhism and Christianity. People of different ethnicity are known to have traditionally lived together, without any significant conflicts.

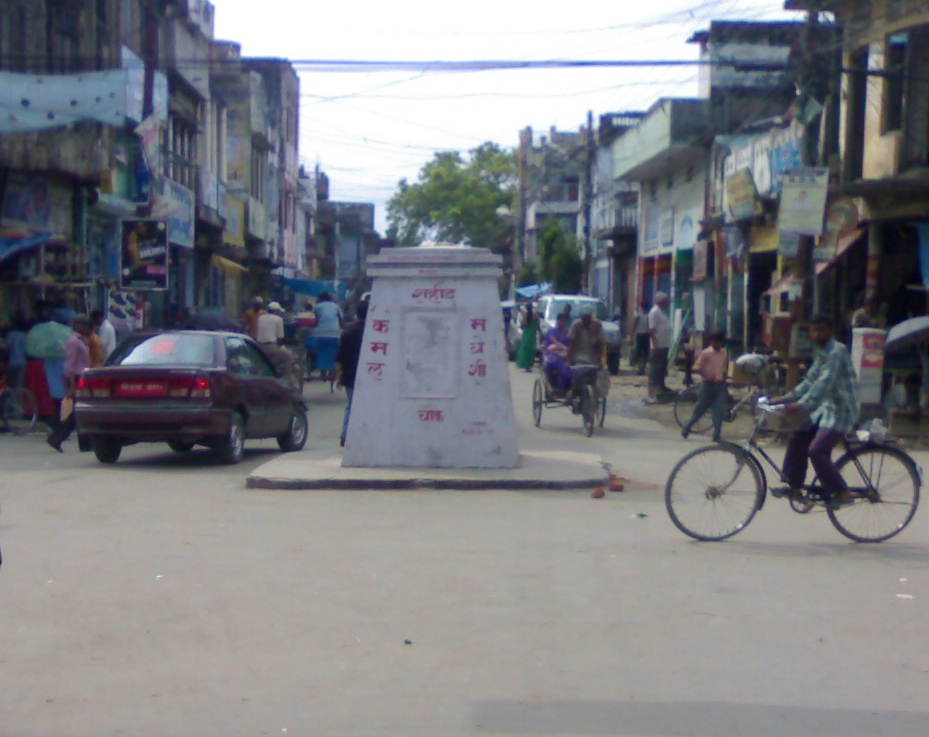
Damaged statue of Tribhuvan at Tribhuvan Chowk Nepalgunj.

However, recent conflict occurred in December 2006 between the Pahari people and the Madhesi people, following immediately after the 2006 democracy movement in Nepal. The conflict resulted in the death of at least one person, while dozens of others were injured.

== Transport ==
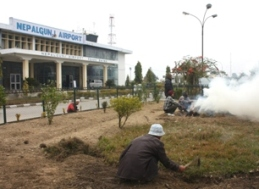
Nepalgunj Airport

Nepalgunj Airport is located 6 km north of the city centre. The airport was officially named Mahendra Airport after the late King Mahendra, but it is commonly referred to as Ranjha Airport. It operated flights to Kathmandu and to airports in less-developed western districts such as Humla, Dolpa, Jumla, Mugu and Rukum. Nepalgunj airport is the gateway for pilgrims headed to Mt Kailash in Tibet via the Simikot-Hilsa route in Humla district, which, following the 2015 earthquake in Nepal, has become the dominant route for Kailash pilgrimage through Nepal.

The construction of a new, modern terminal building at Ranjha Airport in Nepalgunj was completed in November 2025, two months ahead of schedule. The Nepalgunj-Kohalpur highway has been widened to four lanes and is considered one of the best in the country. This has made the journey to Kolhapur easy.

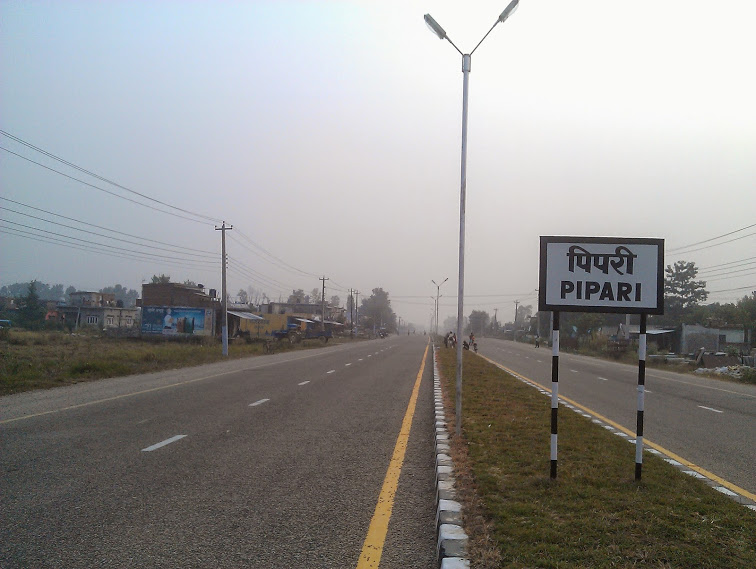
Section of the newly widened Surkhet road at Pipari

Nepalgunj has bus and minibus services. The country's longest highway, the Mahendra Highway, runs through the town of Kohalpur, 10 kilometers from Nepalgunj city center.

An Indian Railways line reaches Rupaidiha across the border. It involves train changes at Gonda, Bahraich, and Nanpara. For travellers coming in from India it is also possible to take an express train to Lucknow and from there a direct bus to Rupaidiha. Indian and Nepalese nationals may cross the border without restrictions; however, there is a customs checkpoint for goods and third country nationals.{{Ranjha Airport’s new terminal building completed ahead of schedule. (2026). Khabarhub. https://english.khabarhub.com/2025/10/505280/ ‌}}

== Infrastructure ==
=== Hospitals ===
- Bheri Zonal Hospital
- Nepalgunj Medical College Teaching Hospital
- Western Hospital Pvt. Ltd.
- Fateh Bal Eye Hospital
- Sushil Koirala Prakhar Cancer Hospital
- Lions Dental Hospital

=== Education ===
Nepalgunj has several boarding and government-run schools. Mahendra Multiple Campus is the largest public higher-level institution in the district, and is affiliated to Tribhuvan University. The city recently inaugurated Lumbini Technological University in July 2022, which provides promising future regarding the education sector in the area.

=== Communications ===
- A Post Office is located at Charbahini Chok
- Telephone networks (land lines) including telephone exchange systems
- Mobile phone networks
- Cable television physical networks including receiving stations and cable distribution networks
- Internet services

=== Tourism ===
With the boost in the tourism industry after the change in political scenario of Nepal in the 1950s, the hotel and restaurant industries in Nepalgunj have experienced significant growth. Some hotels of the city feature in the atmospheric travel memoir A Glimpse of Eternal Snows by Jane Wilson-Howarth.

== Climate ==
Nepalgunj has a sub-tropical climate. Temperatures sometimes exceed 40 °C (104 °F) from April to June. During the rainy season—arriving in June and lasting into September—it is less hot but sometimes very humid. Winter is usually pleasant while the sun is out. It sometimes is foggy and overcast; then it can be chilly with temperatures below 10 °C (50 °F) but no frost. The highest temperature ever recorded in Nepalgunj was 44 °C (111 °F) in June 2023, while the lowest temperature ever recorded was −0.3 °C (31.5 °F) on 9 January 2013.

Climate data for Nepalgunj (1991–2020 normals, extremes 1987–2017)
Month	Jan	Feb	Mar	Apr	May	Jun	Jul	Aug	Sep	Oct	Nov	Dec	Year
Record high °C (°F)	28.0 (82.4)	35.0 (95.0)	39.6 (103.3)	39.4 (102.9)	44.2 (111.6)	45.0 (113.0)	41.5 (106.7)	38.2 (100.8)	36.5 (97.7)	35.7 (96.3)	33.0 (91.4)	29.5 (85.1)	45.0 (113.0)
Mean daily maximum °C (°F)	20.1 (68.2)	25.5 (77.9)	31.2 (88.2)	36.6 (97.9)	38.0 (100.4)	36.6 (97.9)	33.8 (92.8)	33.6 (92.5)	33.3 (91.9)	31.8 (89.2)	28.3 (82.9)	23.1 (73.6)	31.0 (87.8)
Daily mean °C (°F)	14.0 (57.2)	17.8 (64.0)	22.5 (72.5)	27.8 (82.0)	30.5 (86.9)	31.0 (87.8)	29.8 (85.6)	29.6 (85.3)	29.0 (84.2)	25.8 (78.4)	21.1 (70.0)	16.3 (61.3)	24.6 (76.3)
Mean daily minimum °C (°F)	7.8 (46.0)	10.1 (50.2)	13.8 (56.8)	18.9 (66.0)	23.0 (73.4)	25.4 (77.7)	25.8 (78.4)	25.6 (78.1)	24.6 (76.3)	19.8 (67.6)	13.8 (56.8)	9.4 (48.9)	18.2 (64.8)
Record low °C (°F)	−0.3 (31.5)	2.8 (37.0)	6.3 (43.3)	8.1 (46.6)	14.4 (57.9)	19.2 (66.6)	19.8 (67.6)	20.4 (68.7)	20.0 (68.0)	13.4 (56.1)	6.8 (44.2)	2.2 (36.0)	−0.3 (31.5)
Average precipitation mm (inches)	22.8 (0.90)	22.7 (0.89)	15.7 (0.62)	20.3 (0.80)	59.4 (2.34)	209.4 (8.24)	482.9 (19.01)	397.4 (15.65)	186.3 (7.33)	46.9 (1.85)	3.5 (0.14)	8.1 (0.32)	1,475.4 (58.09)
Average precipitation days (≥ 1.0 mm)	2.5	2.5	2.0	2.1	5.4	10.3	19.2	17.7	10.7	2.3	0.4	0.6	75.7
Source 1: Department of Hydrology and Meteorology
Source 2: World Meteorological Organization

== Places of interest ==
The statue of Junge Mahādeva

- Bageshwori Temple
- Banke National Park
- Manpur Mainapokhar is half an hour drive to travel Badhiya Lake
- Bardia National Park is an hour's drive west
- Karnali River is a 90 minutes drive west
- Tharu villages in Deukhuri Valley to the west along the Mahendra Rajmarg
- Surkhet, an Inner Terai Valley north of Nepalgunj

== Sports ==
Cricket and association football are the two most popular sports in Nepalgunj. Most of the city's big sports tournaments are held in the city's football stadium and gymnasium. As of September 2011, an international cricket stadium is under construction in Kohalpur.

== Media ==
Radio Bageshwori, 94.6 MHz, is the first commercial radio station established in western part of Nepal which is also a household name in Nepalgunj, Banke has been a pillar of the community for nearly two decades. Established in 2004, on October 12, the radio station boasts a long and rich history of providing informative, educational, and entertaining programs to the people of Nepalgunj and surrounding areas. The city also has several community radio stations:

- Radio Sadvab " Sabai ko Radio " 91.2 MHz
- Radio Himal 92.6 MHz (close)
- Nepalgunj Community FM 104.8 MHz
- Bheri FM 105.4 MHz
- Radio Krishnasar 94 MHz
- Bheri Awaj FM 95.6 MHz (close)
- Morning Star 90.0 MHz
- DAINIK Nepalgunj National newspaper
- www.nepalgunjnews.com

and also Two cinema halls, Cineroyal and QFX Bageshwori, can be found in Nepalgunj.

== Notable people ==
- Sita Rana Magar, woman cricketer
- Ruby Khan, woman activist
- Abinash Bohara, national cricketer
- Mohna Ansari, human rights activist
- Parvati Thapa, sportsperson (shooting), first woman to represent Nepal at the Olympics.

== See also ==
- Ghorahi
- Kohalpur
- Surkhet
