= Banke District =

Coordinates: 28°03′N 81°37′E

Banke District बाँके
- District
- Country: Nepal
- Province: Lumbini Province
- Administrative Headquarter: Nepalganj

Government
  - Type: Coordination committee
  - Body: DCC, Banke

Area
  - Total: 2,337 km^{2} (902 sq mi)

Population (2011)
  - Total: 491,313
  - Density: 210.2/km^{2} (544.5/sq mi)
- Time zone: UTC+05:45 (Nepal Time)
- Telephone Code: 081
- Language: Nepali

Banke District (Nepali: बाँके जिल्ला, romanized: Bām̐kē jillā; [bãke], a part of Lumbini Province, is one of the 77 districts of Nepal. The district, located in midwestern Nepal with Nepalganj as its district headquarters, covers an area of 2,337 km^{2} (902 sq mi) and had a population of 385,840 in 2001 and 491,313 in 2011. There are three main cities in the Banke District: Nepalganj, Kohalpur and Khajura Bajaar.

== Geography and Climate ==
Banke is bordered on the west by Bardiya district. Rapti zone's Salyan and Dang Deukhuri Districts border to the north and east. To the south lies Uttar Pradesh, India, a country in Asia; specifically Shravasti and Bahraich districts of Awadh. East of Nepalganj the international border follows the southern edge of the Dudhwa Range of the Siwaliks.

Most of the district is drained by the Rapti, except the district's western edge is drained by the Babai. Rapti and Babai cross into Uttar Pradesh, a state in India, Nepal's neighboring country and eventually join the Karnali, whose name has changed to Ghaghara.

Climate Zone	Elevation Range	% of Area
Lower Tropical	below 300 meters (1,000 ft)	79.1%
Upper Tropical	300 to 1,000 meters 1,000 to 3,300 ft.	20.6%
Subtropical	1,000 to 2,000 meters 3,300 to 6,600 ft.	0.3%

== Demographics ==
Historical population
Census year	Pop.	±% p.a.
1981	205,323	—
1991	285,604	+3.36%
2001	385,840	+3.05%
2011	491,313	+2.45%
2021	603,393	+2.08%
Source: Citypopulation

At the time of the 2021 Nepal census, Banke District had a population of 603,194. 9.01% of the population is under 5 years of age. It has a literacy rate of 73.40% and a sex ratio of 1033 females per 1000 males. 266,111 (44.12%) lived in municipalities.

Ethnic groups/castes in Banke district (2021)
1. Muslim (18.3%)
2. Chhetri (16.1%)
3. Tharu (13.7%)
4. Magar (5.74%)
5. Bahun (5.48%)
6. Kami (5.14%)
7. Yadav (4.38%)
8. Thakuri (4.34%)
9. Kurmi (2.57%)
10. Chamar (2.22%)
11. Terai Brahmin (1.77%)
12. Damai (1.45%)
13. Other Madheshi non-Dalit (8.75%)
14. Other Madheshi Dalit (4.62%)
15. Other Hill Janjati (1.62%)
16. Others (3.80%)

Khas people are the largest group, making up 34% of the population. Khas Dalits make up 7% of the population. Madheshi people are the second-largest group, being 24% of the population, of which Madheshi Dalits were 7% of the population.

Languages of Banke District (2021)
1. Nepali (41.8%)
2. Awadhi (37.2%)
3. Tharu (13.4%)
4. Urdu (3.14%)
5. Hindi (2.13%)
6. Magar Dhut (1.04%)
7. Others (1.39%)

At the time of the 2021 census, 41.76% of the population spoke Nepali, 37.16% Awadhi, 13.38% Tharu, 3.14% Urdu, 2.13% Hindi and 1.04% Magar as their first language. In 2011, 37.6% of the population spoke Nepali as their first language.

Religion in Banke District (2021)
Religion	Percent
Hinduism	78.90%
Islam	18.66%
Christianity	1.61%
Buddhism	0.67%
Other or not stated	0.16%

== Sub- Metropolitan City, Municipality and Rural Municipalities ==
There are one Sub-metropolitan city, one Municipality and six Rural Municipalities in Banke District.

- Nepalgunj Sub-Metropolitan City
- Kohalpur Municipality
- Rapti-Sonari Rural Municipality
- Narainapur Rural Municipality
- Duduwa Rural Municipality
- Janaki Rural Municipality
- Khajura Rural Municipality
- Baijanath Rural Municipality

=== Former VDCs and Municipalities ===
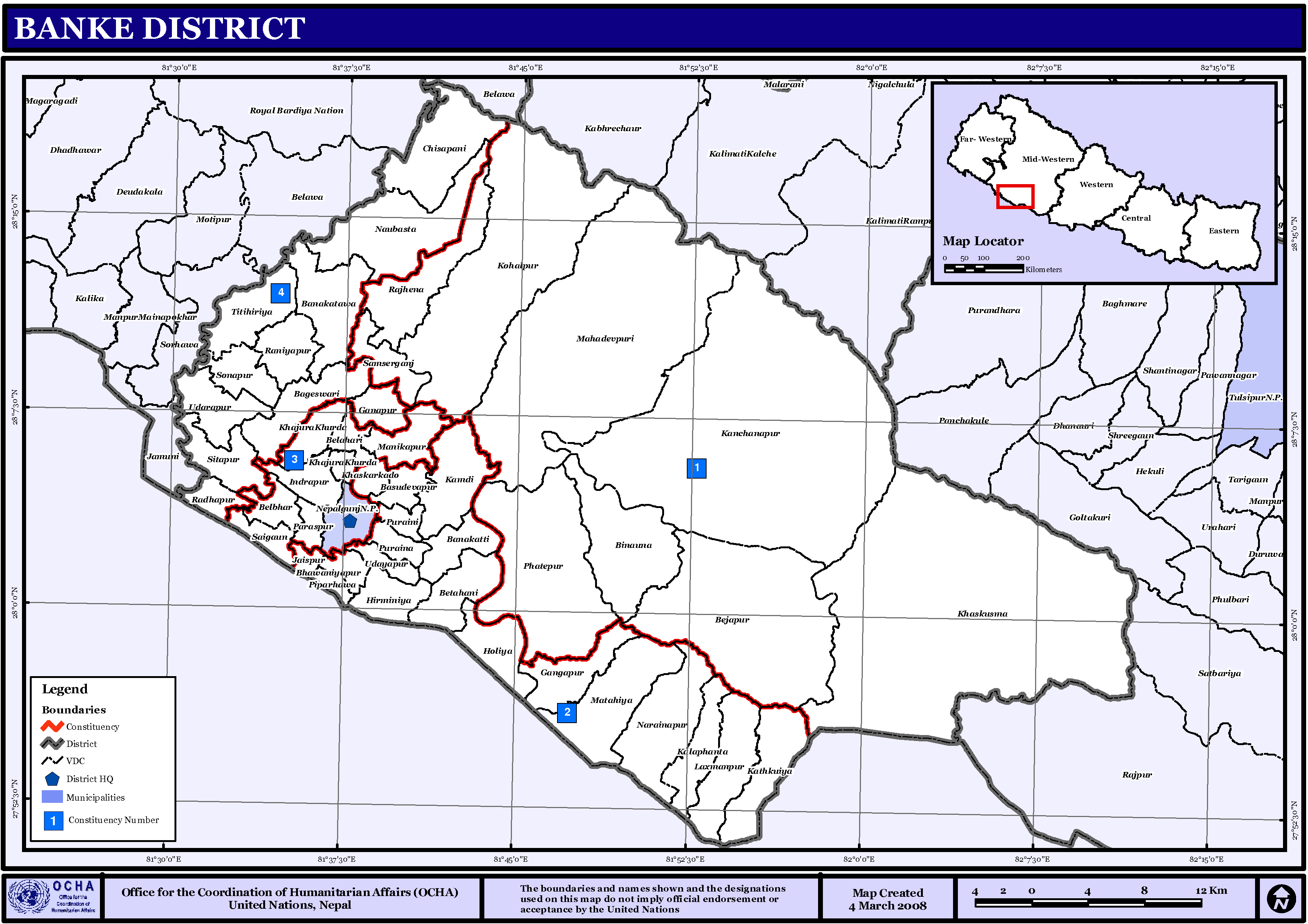
Map of the VDC/s and Municipalities (blue) in Banke District

- Bageshwari
- Bashudevpur
- Baijapur
- Belahari
- Belbhar
- Betahani
- Bhawaniyapur
- Binauna
- Chisapani
- Ganapur
- Gangapur
- Hirminiya
- Holiya
- Indrapur
- Jaispur
- Kalaphanta
- Kamdi
- Kanchanapur
- Kathkuiya
- Khajura Khurda
- Khaskarkado
- Khaskusma
- Kohalpur
- Laksmanpur
- Mahadevpuri
- Manikapur
- Matahiya
- Narainapur
- Naubasta
- Nepalganj
- Parsapur
- Phatepur
- Piparhawa
- Puraina
- Puraini
- Radhapur
- Rajhena
- Raniyapur
- Saigaun
- Samserganj
- Sitapur
- Sonapur
- Titahiriya
- Udarapur
- Udayapur

== See also ==
- Zones of Nepal
