= Labour Movements in Nepal =

Organized Labour and Labour movement were practiced from early 20th century along with the inception of industrilisation in Nepal druing the Rana Regime. The first recorded labour protest was Biratnagar Jute Mill Strike, 1947 organized by prominent Nepalese politicians that lead to political movement. Huge number of labour participated jute mill protest that gave The anti-Rana Revolution a height and ended the 103 years long autocratic rules of Rana in 1951.

== Organized Labour in Nepal ==
Labourers are organized into many trade unions and professional unions. However the unions were restricted during the uniparty Panchayat System, after the restoration of democracy in 1990 the new constitution protected the right of unionism. The Labour movement in nepal is composit of movements initiated by various professionals. Among them Labour Protest, Teacher's Protest, Journalists' Protest counts.

The first Labour protest Jute mill protest taken place in 1947 had demanded with the following some rights and some facilities.

- Grant recognition to the workers' union.

Officially recognize the workers' organization. Increase salaries by 35 percent Raise the existing remuneration by 35% to each labour

- Fix the daily working hours at 8 hours

Setting standard daily work duration to a maximum of 8 hours.

- Make proper arrangements for housing.

Provide suitable quarters or accommodation for living

== Civil Servant Movements in Nepal ==
Main Article Civil Servant Movements in Nepal

== Teacher Movements in Nepal ==
Teachers begun to be organized for professional rights from Pancyayat era. The first teachers protest was taken place in 1979 from Hetauda that spread across other districts including the capital Kathmandu. Currently there are various organizations in which the teachers are associated. The prominent ones are Confederation of Nepalese Teachers, Nepal Teachers Association, Nepal National Teachers Association, Unified All Nepal Teachers Association.

See also Teacher Movements in Nepal

== Journalists' Movements in Nepal ==
Nepali journalists actively protested direct royal rule and censorship, notably during the 2006 pro-democracy movement (Jana Andolan II), forcing the government to commit to media freedoms. The Federation of Nepalese Journalists has organized continuous sit-ins and protests against major media houses to fight illegal mass-firings and demands for fair compensation. The journalists protests provided necessary pressure to the government to formulate some legislations i.e. Working Journalists Act, 2051 (1993), and structure like Minimum Wages Fixation Committee (MWFC)

Working Journalists Act, 2051 (1993) the legislation aims to secure professional rights, fair wages, medical coverage, and job security for media workers. Despite legal protections, reports by the FNJ and International Federation of Journalists (IFJ) highlight widespread non-compliance, with many media outlets failing to provide appointment letters, insurance, or timely salaries.
