= Biratnagar =

Capital of Koshi province

Biratnagar विराटनगर
- Metropolitan city
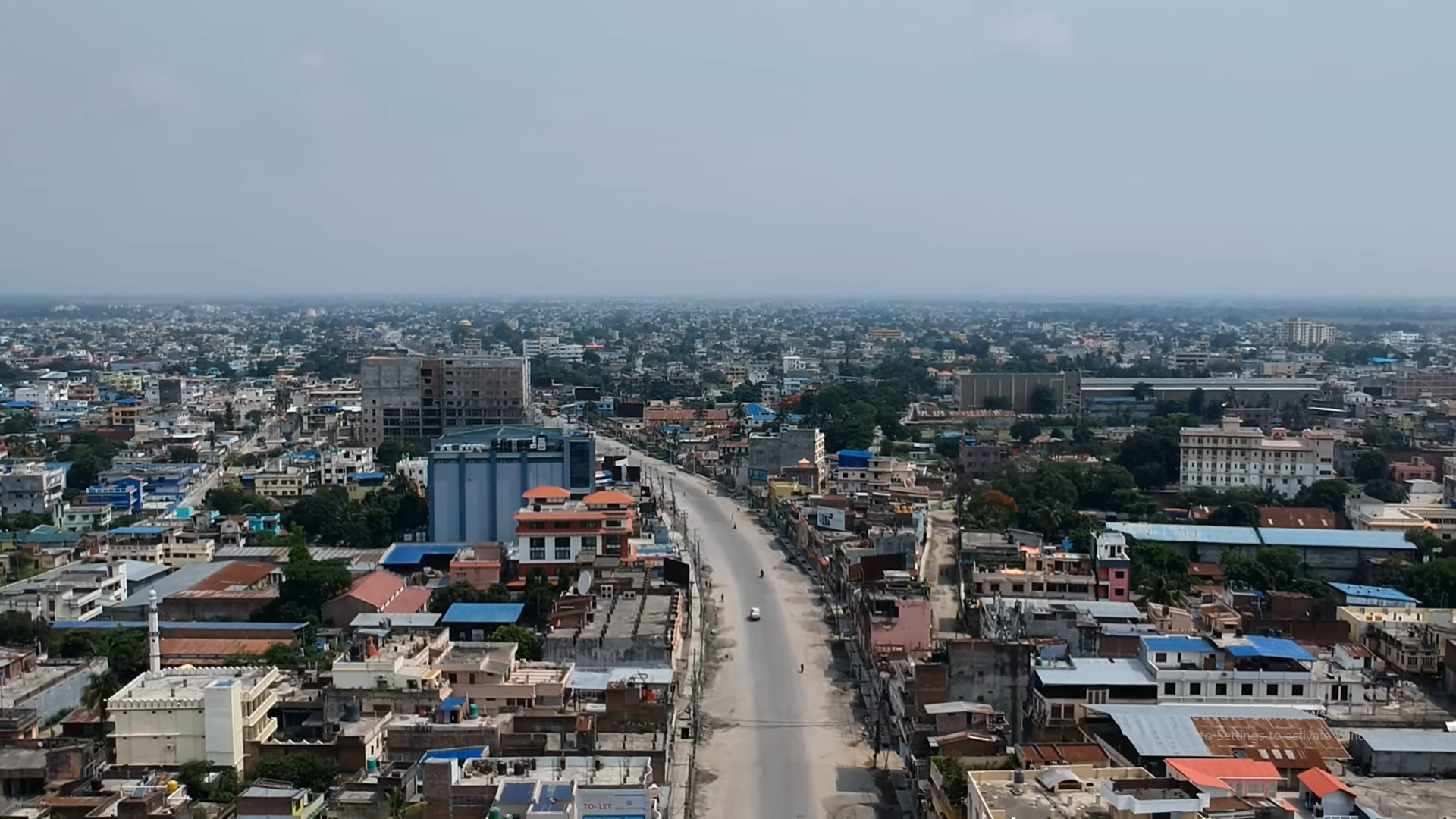
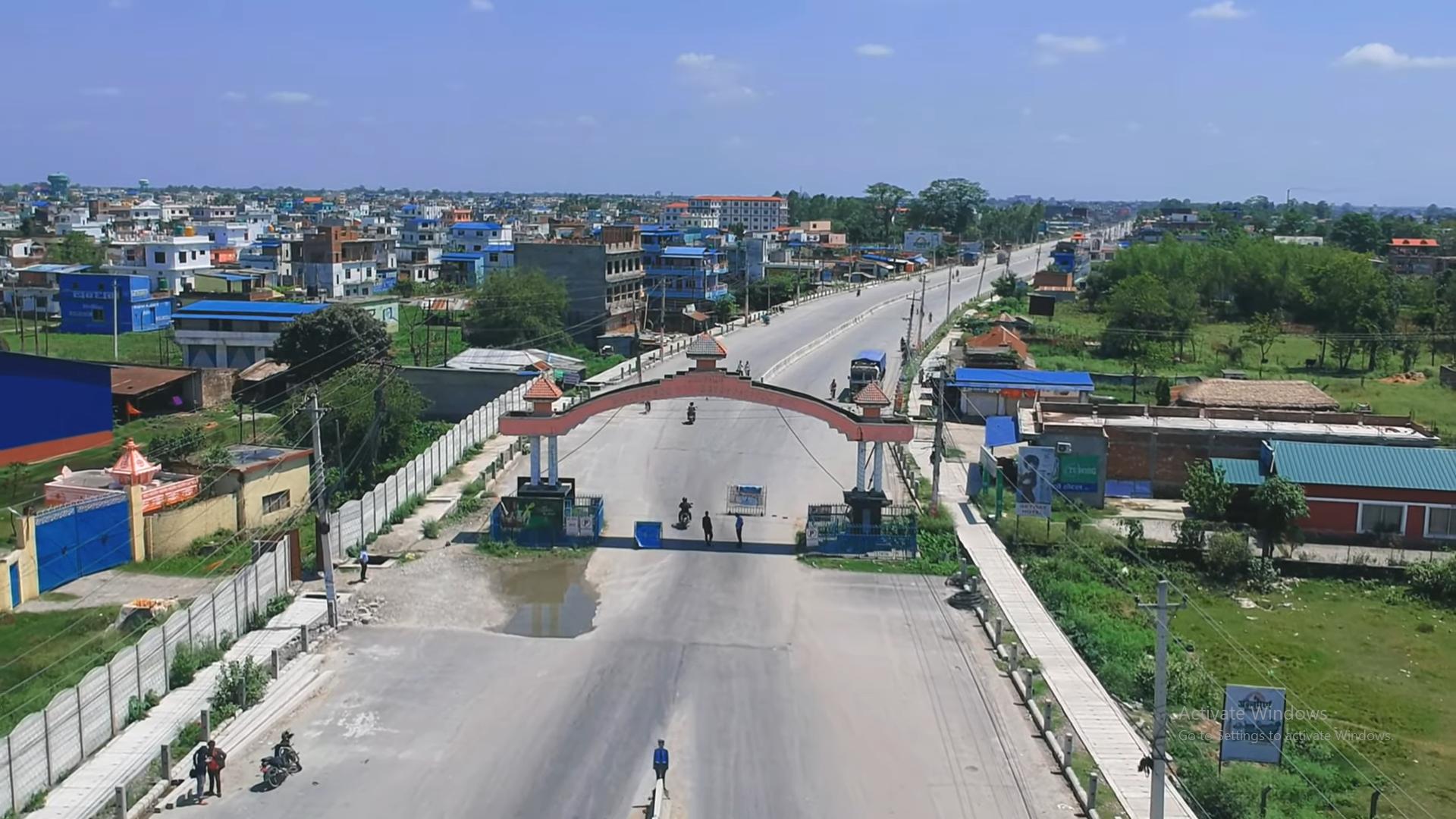
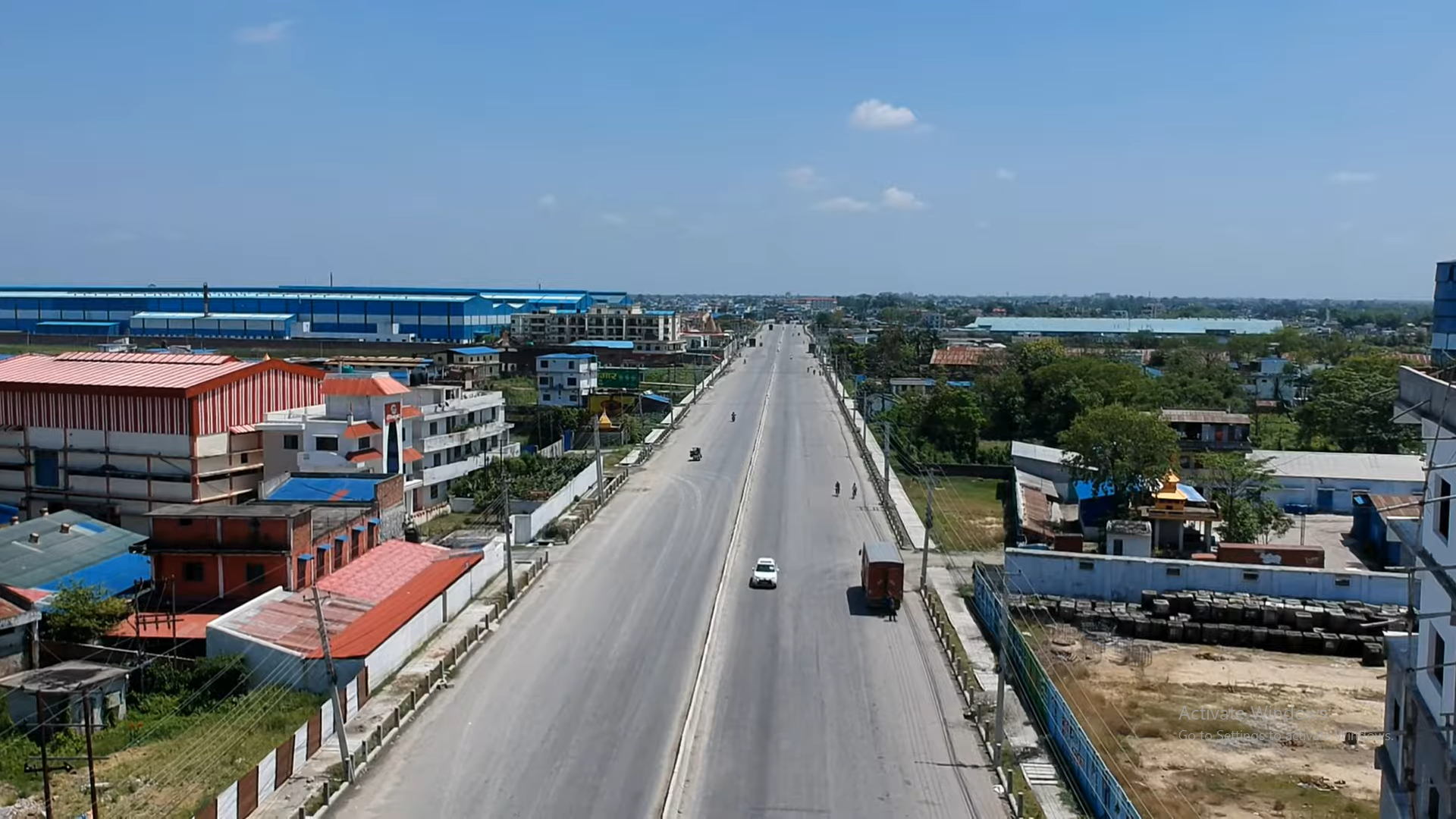
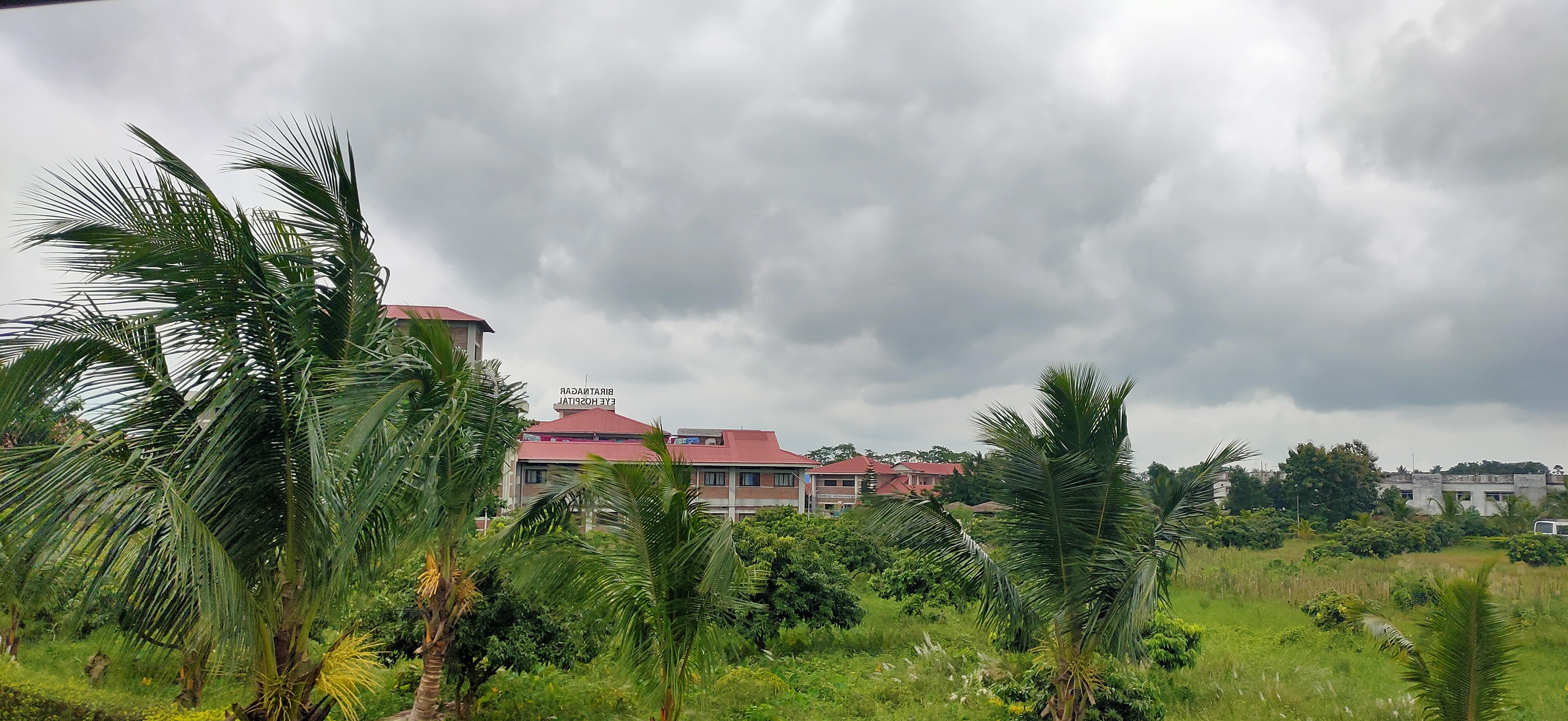
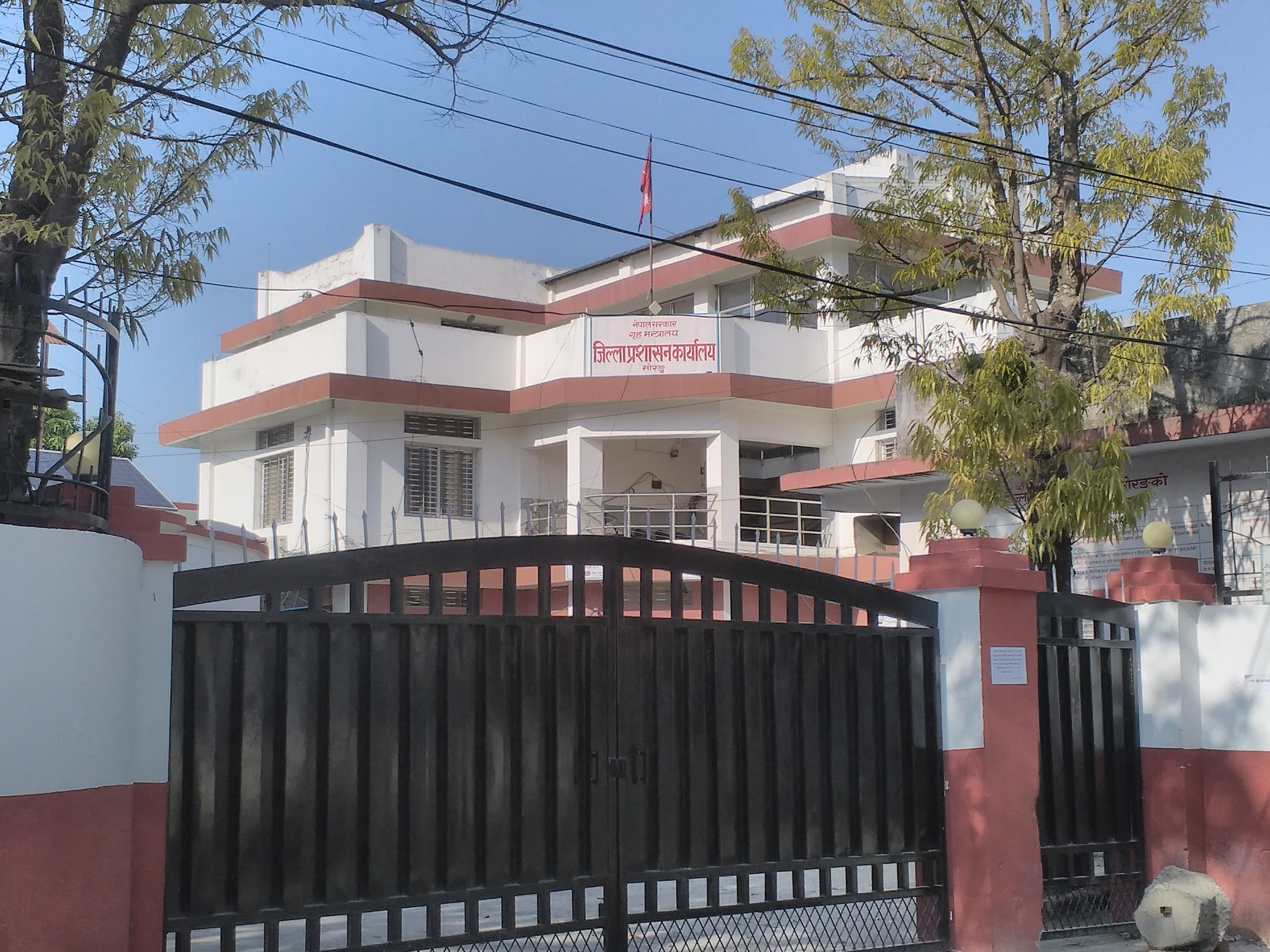
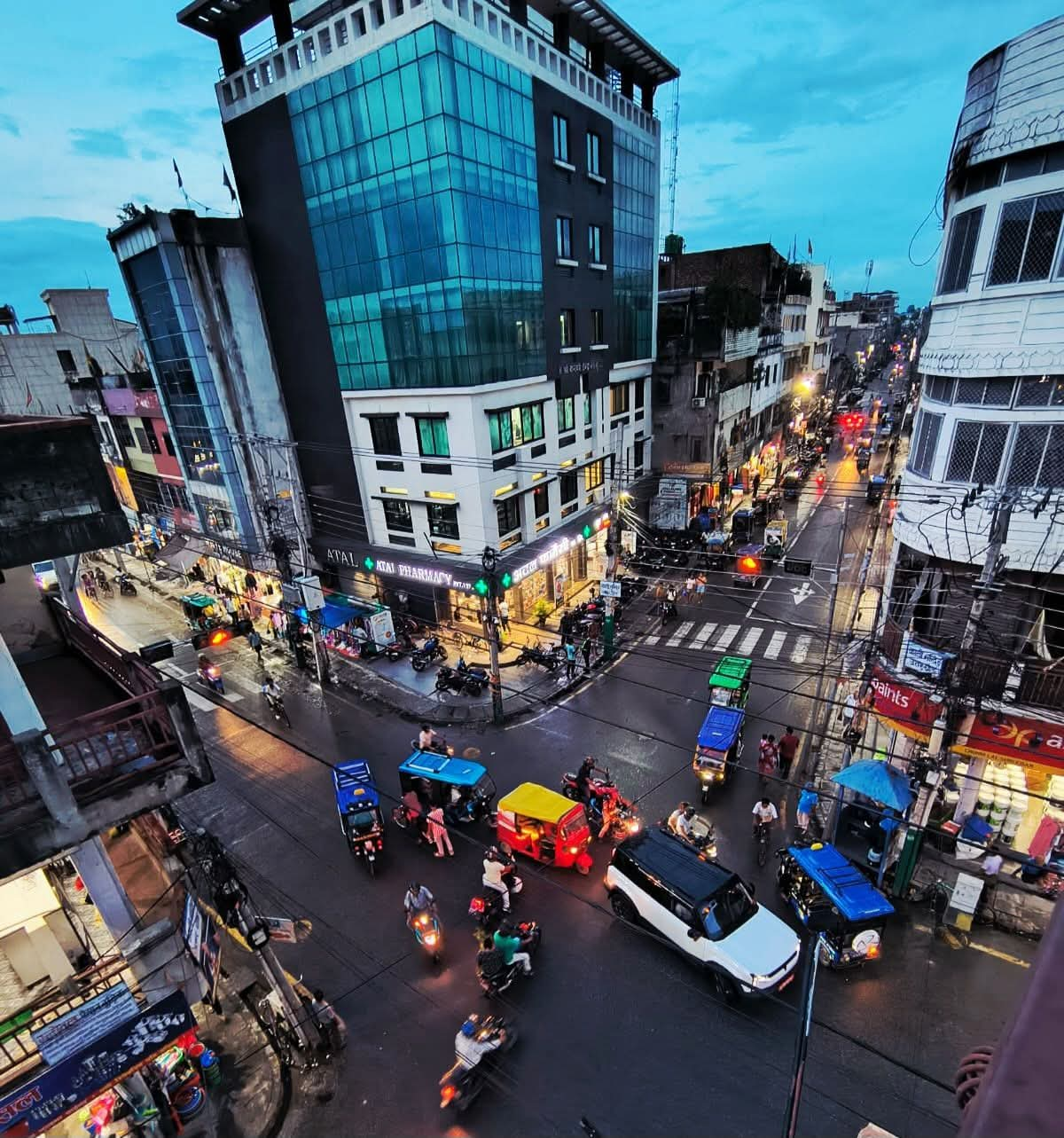
- From top, left to right: Biratnagar Gate, Biratnagar industrial skyline, Biratnagar market skyline, greenery panorama seen from Biratnagar Eye Hospital, Morang DAO, main hub for entering the Hospital Road and highway of Biratnagar
- Nicknames: Industrial Capital
- Interactive map of Biratnagar
- Location of Biratnagar in Koshi Province Biratnagar (Nepal)
- Coordinates: 26°27′15″N 87°16′47″E
- Country: Nepal
- Province: Koshi
- District: Morang
- Incorporated: 1914 (as district headquarters)
- Upgraded to metropolitan city: 2017
- Named for: King Birat
- Wards: 19

Government
  - Type: Mayor-council
  - Body: Biratnagar Metropolitan City Council
  - Mayor: Nagesh Koirala (Congress)
  - Deputy Mayor: Shilpa Niraula Karki (CPN-UML)
  - Chief Administrative Officer

Area
  - Total: 77.06 km^{2} (29.75 sq mi)
- Elevation: 80 m (260 ft)

Population (2021)
  - Total: 244,750
  - Rank: 6th (Nepal); 1st (Koshi Province)
  - Density: 3,176/km^{2} (8,226/sq mi)

Languages
  - Official: Nepali
  - Regional: Maithili
- Time zone: UTC+5:45 (NST)
- Postal code: 56613
- Area code: 021
- Website: biratnagarmun.gov.np

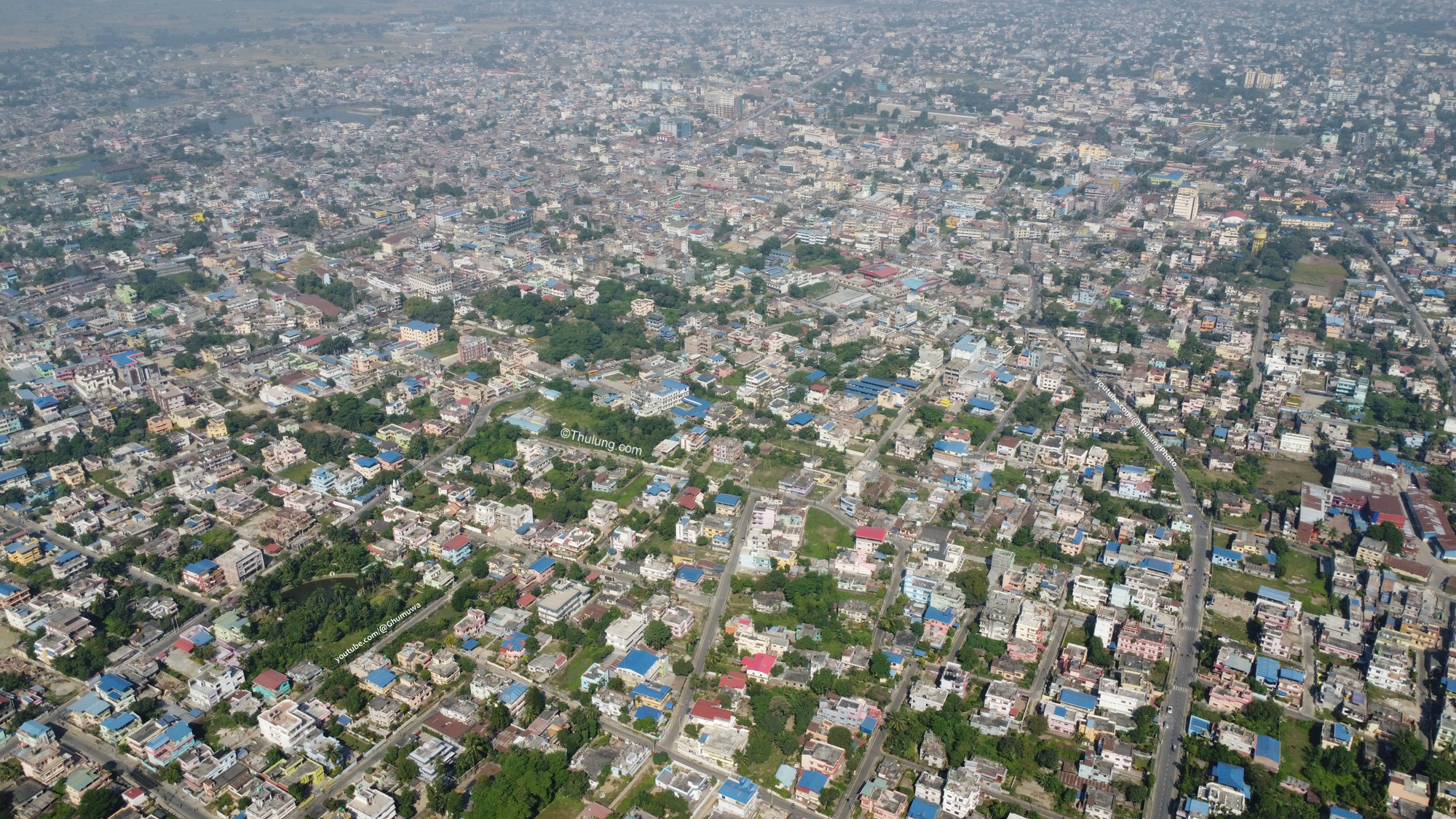
Aerial view of Biratnagar

Biratnagar (Maithili: विराटनगर) is the capital and largest & fastest growing city of the easternmost Koshi Province, Nepal. The city had a population of 244,750 at the 2021 census. It is also the headquarters of the district of Morang.

Biratnagar was declared a metropolitan city on 22 May 2017 with the merger of additional wards from different local bodies. Based on the 2021 census, it is the sixth largest city of Nepal in terms of population.

As the home to Nepal's first large-scale industry, the Biratnagar Jute Mills, the city is also popularly known as the industrial capital of Nepal. The city has contributed actively to the Nepalese democracy movement by being the birthplace of five democratically elected prime ministers and that of an interim prime minister of Nepal. The latter claim is also evident from the fact that the first labor strike leading to the anti-Rana movement started from Biratnagar.

Modern-day Biratnagar serves as an entry point to eastern Nepal as well as north-eastern India. It is the second Nepalese city, after Janakpur, to have a connection with the Indian Railways and the city operates an integrated check post (ICP) on the Indian border. It is also the starting point of the Koshi highway, which forms one of the three crucial Nepalese north-south corridors that are designed to connect India and China via land.

== History ==
=== Indigenous history ===
In Nepali, Birat (Nepali: विराट) refers to King "Virata" of the Matsya Kingdom and Nagar (Nepali: नगर) means "city"; literally King Virata's City.

=== 20th century ===
In 1914, Colonel Jit Bahadur Khatri, the then district governor, laid the foundations of modern Biratnagar by moving the hospital, post office, prison and the customs, land registry, forestry and auditor offices to Gograha Bazaar from Rangeli, the then district capital of Morang.

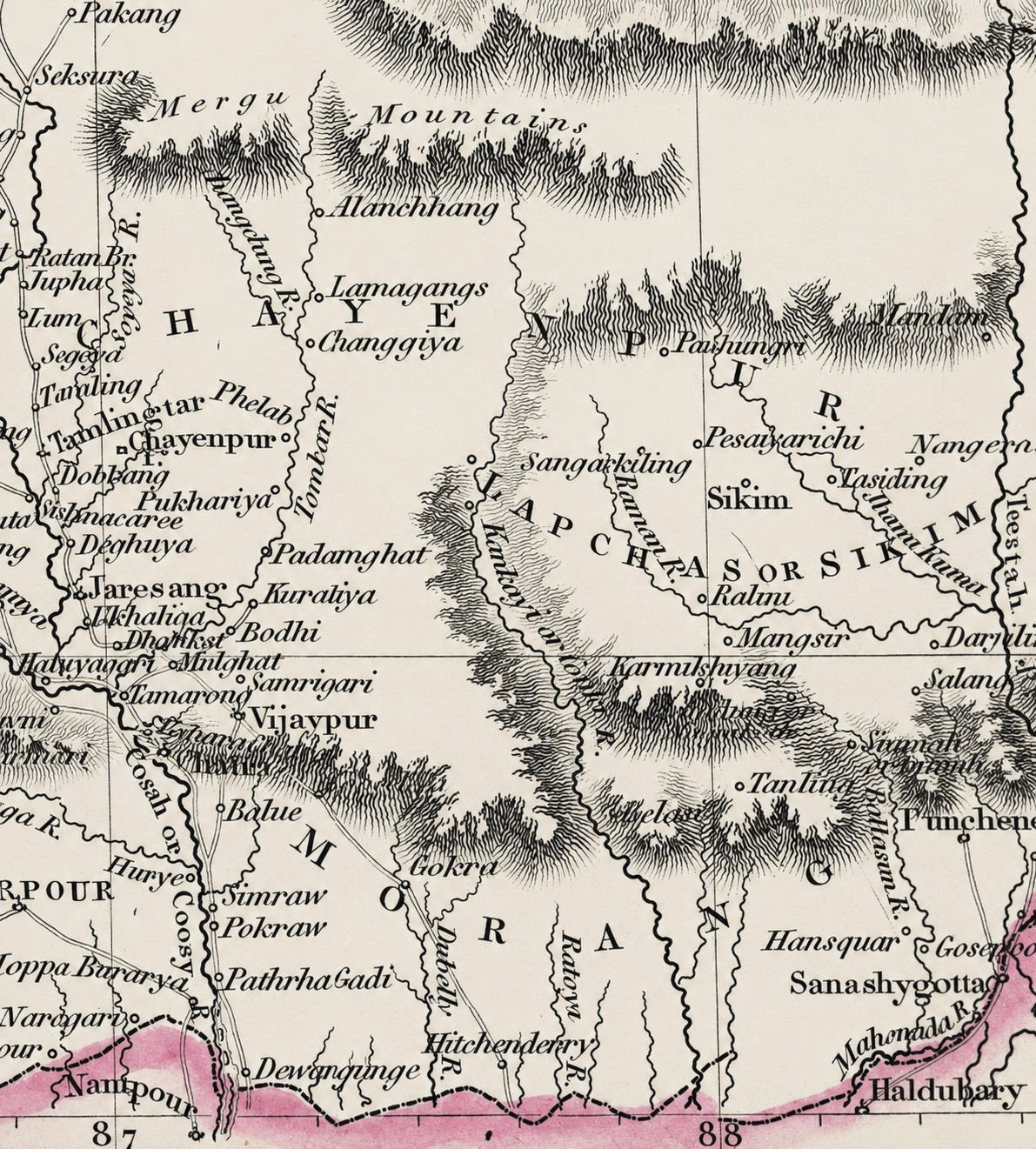
map of 1817 showing Chayanpoor in the North, Sikkim in the East and Morang in the South

The old name of Biratnagar was Gograha Bazaar. The ruins of temples, palaces, and ponds are scattered in a vast area to the south of the current city, in Vedhyari, Buddhanagar. The preservation of this heritage has been a major problem citing the encroachment of newcomers into the city.

The town was named Biratnagar in 1919 (1976 BS) by Keshar Shamsher Rana after the ruins of a palace, thought to be of King Virat, and other objects of historical importance were found. The Kingdom of Virata mentioned in Mahabharata is however believed to be Viratnagar, located in present-day Rajasthan. King Virata was the king of the Matsya Kingdom, in whose court the Pandavas spent a year in concealment during their Agyaata Vaasa in the exile. According to the Markandeya Purana, the famous seven Kirata kingdoms during the Mahabharat time were Aswakut or Kabul, Kulya or Kulu Valley, Matsya or North Bihar Paundra or Bengal, Sumer or Assam, Malak or Mlek or Lohit, Kinner Kirat or Garhwal and Nepal. In those days, the Kirat people were ruling all the lands from Himalayan Mountains to the sea shores of the Bay of Bengal.

On 4 March 1947, the first anti-Rana movement in Nepal started in Biratnagar at the Biratnagar jute mills under the leadership of Girija Prasad Koirala and B. P. Koirala. This sparked a countrywide anti-Rana demonstration that eventually led to the abolishment of Rana rule in Nepal. During the panchayat system in Nepal the Pradhan Pancha who also happened to manage district level body for Biratnagar was Govinda Bahadur Baruwal. He was also the committee member of Mahendra Morang Adarsh Multiple Campus (MMAMC) which is one of the oldest, most prestigious and leading academic institution of Koshi Province.The Baruwal family was one of the most prominent and influential lineages in Biratnagar during that era.

== Geography ==
Biratnagar is the administrative center of the Greater Birat Development Area, which aims to connect Biratnagar with major nearby towns—including Itahari, Gothgau, Biratchowk, and Dharan—along the Koshi Highway, representing a combined, densely populated urban corridor sharing an estimated total population of 804,300 people across 159,332 households. Geographically, Biratnagar lies 399 km (248 mi) east of Kathmandu, 362 kilometers south of Kimathanka - the Nepalese counterpart of the Nepal-China border at Zhentang, and 6 km (3.7 mi) north of Jogbani - the bordering town in the Indian state of Bihar. Its connection with Kathmandu runs primarily through the East-West highway and secondarily through the mid-hill highway, with that of Kimathanka through the Koshi highway, and with that of Jogbani through the Rani Path (the old highway), the Koshi Path (the new highway), and the recently proposed Jogbani-Biratnagar rail link.

== Climate ==
The city has its best climate between February to mid-April and August to early December. The highest temperature ever recorded in Biratnagar was 43.0 °C (109.4 °F) on the 14 April 1992, while the lowest temperature ever recorded was −1.0 °C (30.2 °F) in December 1970 and January 1971.

Climate data for Biratnagar (1991–2020 normals, extremes 1968–2017)
Month	Jan	Feb	Mar	Apr	May	Jun	Jul	Aug	Sep	Oct	Nov	Dec	Year
Record high °C (°F)	29.7 (85.5)	33.5 (92.3)	39.2 (102.6)	42.0 (107.6)	41.5 (106.7)	41.3 (106.3)	38.7 (101.7)	39.0 (102.2)	38.2 (100.8)	36.6 (97.9)	34.0 (93.2)	30.5 (86.9)	42.0 (107.6)
Mean daily maximum °C (°F)	22.3 (72.1)	26.3 (79.3)	31.1 (88.0)	33.9 (93.0)	33.6 (92.5)	33.1 (91.6)	32.6 (90.7)	33.0 (91.4)	32.6 (90.7)	31.9 (89.4)	29.5 (85.1)	25.3 (77.5)	30.4 (86.7)
Daily mean °C (°F)	15.8 (60.4)	18.9 (66.0)	23.5 (74.3)	27.4 (81.3)	28.6 (83.5)	29.2 (84.6)	29.3 (84.7)	29.5 (85.1)	28.8 (83.8)	26.7 (80.1)	22.5 (72.5)	18.1 (64.6)	24.9 (76.8)
Mean daily minimum °C (°F)	9.2 (48.6)	11.5 (52.7)	15.9 (60.6)	20.8 (69.4)	23.5 (74.3)	25.3 (77.5)	25.9 (78.6)	26.0 (78.8)	25.0 (77.0)	21.4 (70.5)	15.5 (59.9)	10.9 (51.6)	19.2 (66.6)
Record low °C (°F)	2.5 (36.5)	4.0 (39.2)	8.0 (46.4)	9.6 (49.3)	15.0 (59.0)	18.0 (64.4)	19.0 (66.2)	19.7 (67.5)	17.5 (63.5)	11.0 (51.8)	7.0 (44.6)	4.9 (40.8)	2.5 (36.5)
Average precipitation mm (inches)	11.1 (0.44)	11.0 (0.43)	16.8 (0.66)	58.8 (2.31)	172.0 (6.77)	306.2 (12.06)	475.6 (18.72)	353.1 (13.90)	269.1 (10.59)	75.7 (2.98)	3.8 (0.15)	4.3 (0.17)	1,757.5 (69.19)
Average precipitation days (≥ 1.0 mm)	1.2	1.5	1.8	4.5	9.9	15.1	18.8	16.3	13.5	3.7	0.4	0.5	87.1
Source 1: World Meteorological Organization
Source 2: Department of Hydrology and Meteorology

== Demography ==
The population of Biratnagar has been increasing consistently due to various reasons and more recently due to close proximity to India resulting to low cost of living and import from nearest border Jogbani as compared to other cities in Nepal.

Ethnic groups in Biratnagar
1. Madheshi (31.0%)
2. Khas (30.0%)
3. Muslim (8.00%)
4. Newar (5.00%)
5. Kewat (4.00%)
6. Marwari (2.00%)
7. Others (20.0%)

As of right now 2026, The imports to Biratnagar from India's border has dropped significantly due to 100rs custom tax enforcement strictly. This improves local business in Nepal but greatly affects the stores whose livelihood depends on Nepali customers.

Languages in Biratnagar
1. Maithili (39.4%)
2. Nepali (38.0%)
3. Urdu (4.70%)
4. Rajasthani (2.70%)
5. Others (14.5%)

At the time of the 2021 Nepal census, Biratnagar Metropolitan City had a population of 218,526. Of these, 39.4% spoke Maithili, 38.3% Nepali, 5.3% Urdu, 2.5% Rajasthani, 2.3% Tharu, 2.1% Rajbanshi, 2.0% Bhojpuri, 1.9% Hindi, 1.6% Newar, 0.8% Bengali, 0.6% Magahi, 0.5% Tamang, 0.4% Rai, 0.3% Gurung, 0.3% Limbu, 0.3% Magar, 0.2% Bhujel, 0.2% Uranw/Urau, 0.1% Bantawa, 0.1% Santali, 0.1% Sunuwar and 0.2% other languages as their first language.

In terms of ethnicity/caste, 16.1% were Hill Brahmin, 10.0% Chhetri, 8.7% Musalman, 5.9% Yadav, 4.6% Newar, 3.9% Kewat, 3.3% Marwadi, 2.9% Dhanuk, 2.8% Teli, 2.8% Tharu, 2.6% Mallaha, 2.6% Rajbanshi, 2.2% other Terai, 2.0% Musahar, 1.8% Halwai, 1.6% Kathabaniyan, 1.5% Kayastha, 1.4% Sudhi, 1.3% Nuniya, 1.2% Dusadh/Paswan/Pasi, 1.2% Magar, 1.2% Rai, 1.0% Bengali, 1.0% Tamang, 0.9% Hajam/Thakur, 0.8% Kalwar, 0.8% Rajput, 0.7% Bantar/Sardar, 0.6% Chamar/Harijan/Ram, 0.6% Gurung, 0.6% Kami, 0.6% Koiri/Kushwaha, 0.6% Sanyasi/Dasnami, 0.6% Tatma/Tatwa, 0.5% Terai Brahmin, 0.5% Kurmi, 0.5% Limbu, 0.5% Sonar, 0.4% Badhaee, 0.3% other Dalit, 0.3% Dhobi, 0.3% Dom, 0.3% Gangai, 0.3% Gharti/Bhujel, 0.3% Jhangad/Dhagar, 0.3% Khatwe, 0.3% Majhi, 0.3% Punjabi/Sikh, 0.2% Badi, 0.2% Baraee, 0.2% Damai/Dholi, 0.2% Dev, 0.2% Khawas, 0.2% Sarki, 0.2% Thakuri, 0.1% Amat, 0.1% Bantawa, 0.1% Bin, 0.1% Chamling, 0.1% Danuwar, 0.1% Dhimal, 0.1% foreigners, 0.1% Gaderi/Bhedihar, 0.1% Halkhor, 0.1% Kahar, 0.1% Kumal, 0.1% Kumhar, 0.1% Lohar, 0.1% Satar/Santal, 0.1% Sunuwar, 0.1% Yakkha and 0.2% others.

In terms of religion, 88.7% were Hindu, 8.9% Muslim, 1.1% Buddhist, 0.7% Kirati, 0.7% Christian, 0.3% Jain, 0.1% Prakriti and 0.2% others.

In terms of literacy, 79.0% could read and write, 1.5% could only read and 19.4% could neither read nor write.

Religion in Biratnagar (2021)
Religion	Percent
Hinduism	88.7%
Islam	8.9%
Others	2.4%

== Economy ==
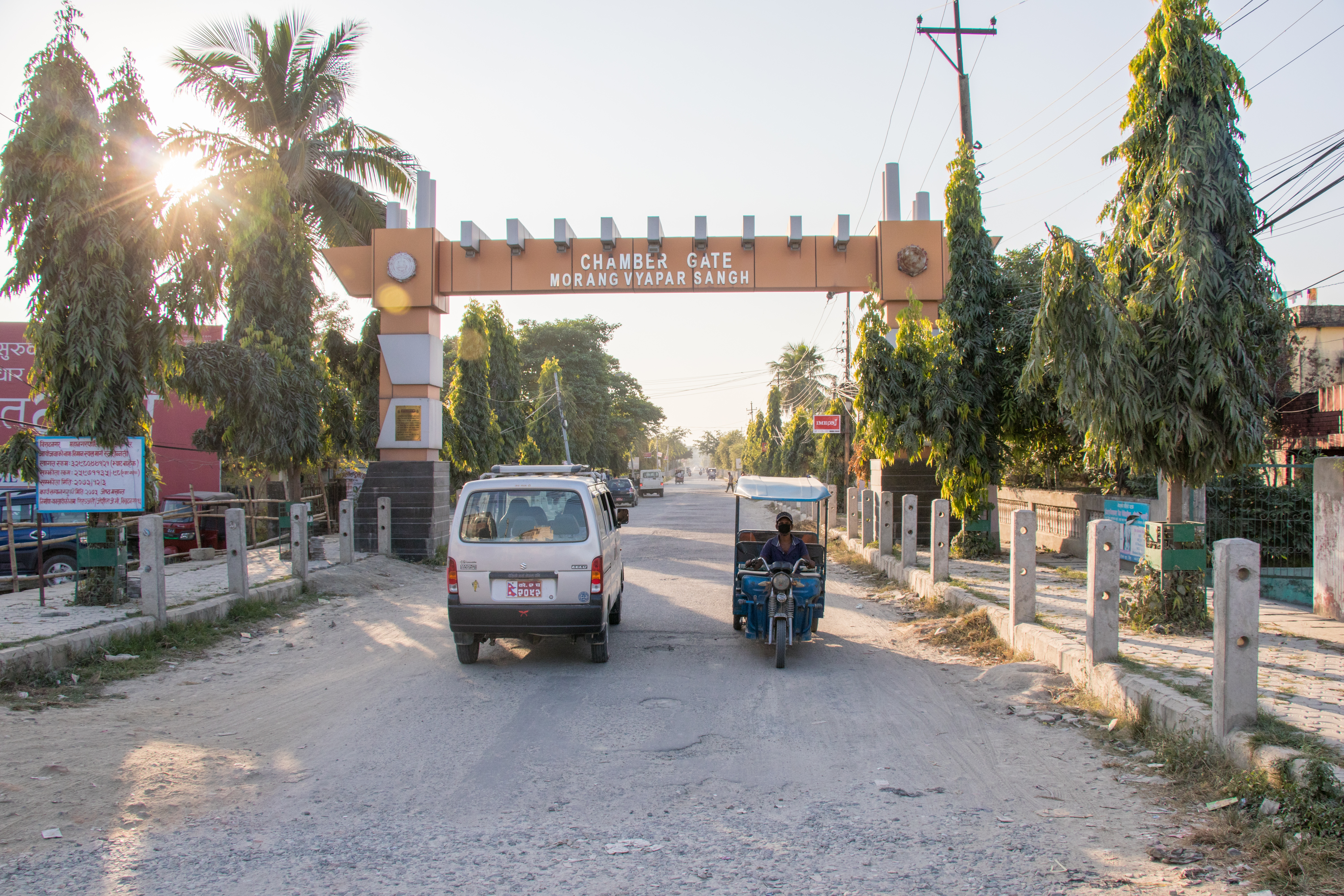
Morang Vyapar Sangh gate

Biratnagar is the economic center of eastern Nepal. It is also known as the "Gateway to Eastern Nepal". The first industry in Nepal, the Biratnagar Jute Mill, was established here. Biratnagar is driven by a startup culture. The multi-million dollar business house, Golchha Organisation, has its roots in Biratnagar where it started as a small startup business. Biratnagar is connected to a major custom route with India and has the second-largest land port in Nepal.

=== Tourism ===
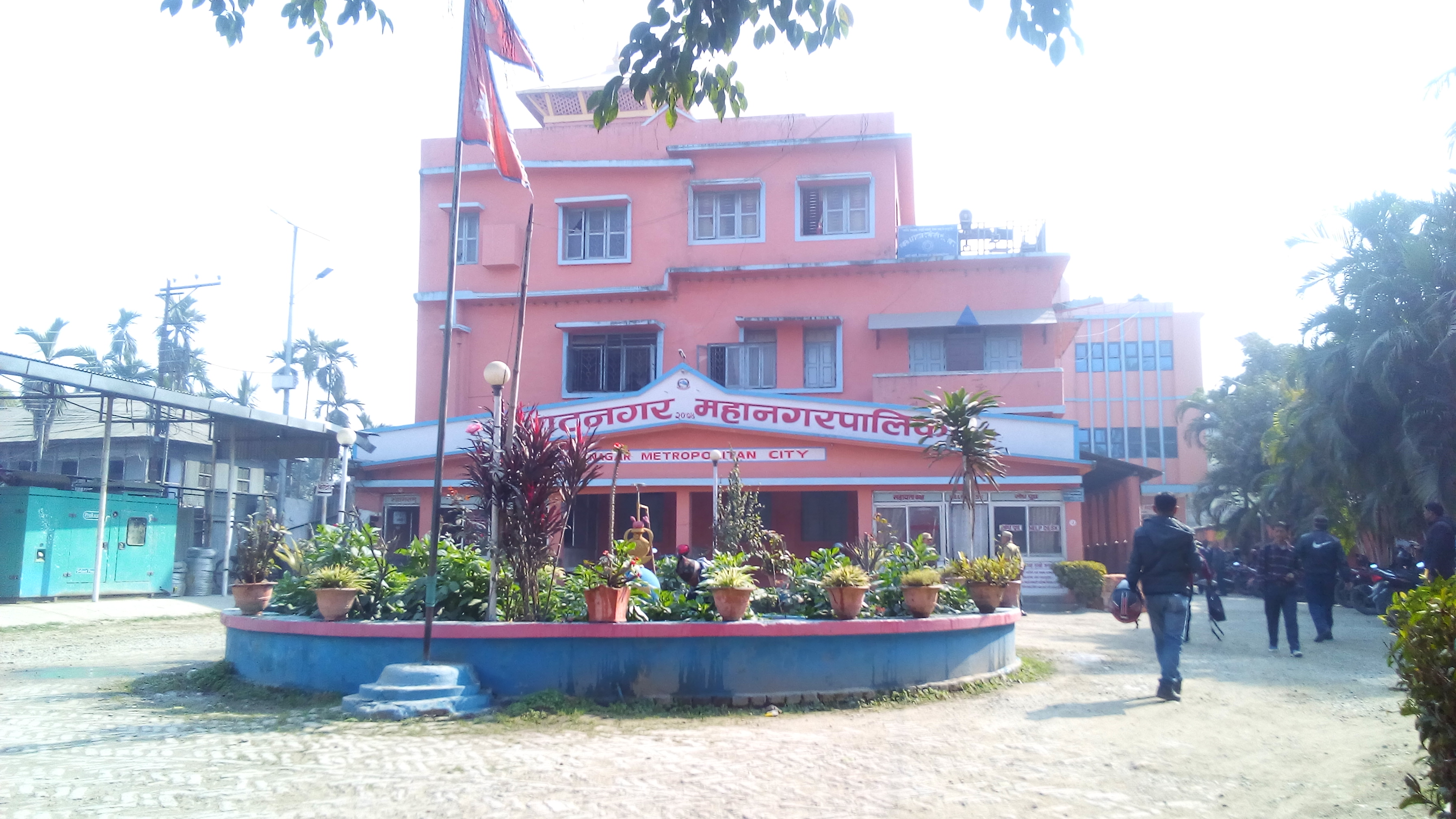
Biratnagar metropolitan office

Biratnagar is a hub for explorers of places in eastern Nepal like Ilam, Taplejung, Sankhuwasabha and Panchthar and other terai districts due to a functioning airport and an important border checkpoint Jogbani in the Araria District of Indian State of Bihar. A number of colorful haat bazaars (weekly markets) are held each week in different parts of the town, where farmers from the rural hinterland set up stalls to trade agricultural products, spices and handicrafts. There are several gardens, temples and places of religious importance in Biratnagar. Gopal Garden, located near Hathkhola, and Hridreyandra Bal Udhhyan near Thulo Mill, are two main gardens.

Dharan is 46 km (30 mi) and Itahari is 24 km (10 mi) north of Biratnagar. These places are famous for Taltalaiya, Ocean Park, Gokulam Resort, Dantakali Temple, Pindeshwor Temple, Budha Subba Temple and Panch Kanya. The hill-station of Bhedetar is a local viewpoint. The tea gardens of Ilam are approximately 4 hours' drive away. Another place of interest is the hilly district of Dhankuta with its orange orchards. The Koshi Tappu Wildlife Reserve, popular with bird-watching enthusiasts, is a 90-minute drive from the city. It is home to the endangered wild buffaloes called "Arna" in Nepali. The largest rhododendron forests of Tinjure, Milke and Jaljale can be reached in about 3–4 hours. Treks with views of Mt. Makalu and Kanchenjunga can be started from the small towns of Basantapur or Tumlingtar.

== Politics ==
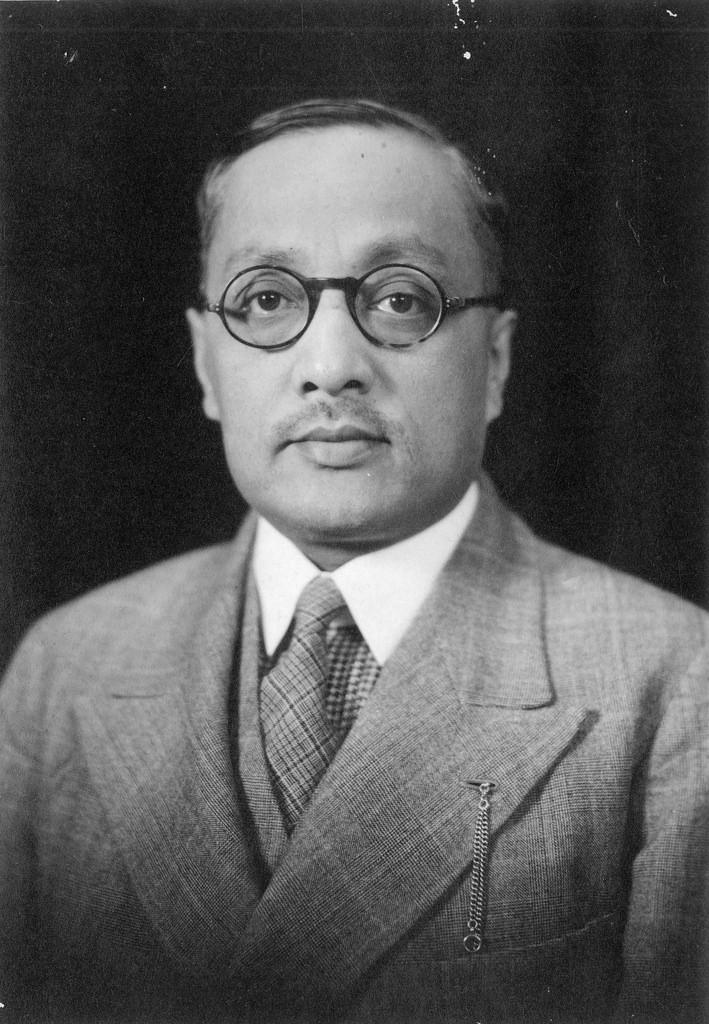
Dstrict Governor (Badahakim) Shiva Pratap Shumsher Thapa, Rana-era governor of Morang

The district headquarters of Morang were moved to Biratnagar from Rangeli in 1914 by the then district governor, Colonel Jit Bahadur Khatri. The next governor, Shiva Pratap Shumsher Thapa, further developed the town. Krishna Prasad Koirala was the first major political leader based in Biratnagar. His sons Matrika Prasad Koirala and Bishweshwar Prasad Koirala were the prime ministers of Nepal after the fall of the Rana rule. Since then Biratnagar has been a major contributor to Nepali politics, and is the most politically active city in the country. Girija Prasad Koirala, the younger brother of Matrika and BP Koirala, was elected prime minister on four occasions; from 1991 to 1994, 1998 to 1999, 2000 to 2001, and from 2006 to 2008. He also served as the acting Head of State from January 2007 to July 2008. Biratnagar is also the birthplace of Man Mohan Adhikari - the first communist prime minister of Nepal, and Sushila Karki - the first female prime minister of Nepal, with the latter also serving as the president of the city's High Court Bar Association until 2004. Leaders like Bharat Mohan Adhikari, Shailaja Acharya, Sushil Koirala, Lal Babu Pandit, Amod Prasad Upadhyay and Mahesh Acharya all hail from this city. The 1973 plane hijack, which was to fund the political revolution, took place at the Biratnagar Airport. The hijack plan, masterminded by Girija Prasad Koirala, was executed by Durga Subedi, Nagendra Dhungel and Basant Bhattarai.

Nepali Congress's Nagesh Koirala and CPN UML's Shilpa Nirala Karki are the current mayor and deputy mayor of the metropolitan, respectively.

== Education ==
Biratnagar is the center of education in eastern Nepal. It is home to the old constituent campus of Tribhuvan University, the Mahendra Morang Adarsh Multiple Campus.

=== Universities ===
- Purbanchal University
- Manmohan Technical University

=== Engineering ===
- Purbanchal University School of Engineering
- Eastern College of Engineering

=== Medicine ===
- Nobel Medical College
- Birat Medical College and Teaching Hospital

=== Forestry ===
- Purbanchal University College of Environment and Forestry

=== Schools ===
The medium of teaching is English in all the private schools, colleges and universities. Government schools have classes in both English Medium and Nepali Medium with primary focus on the firmer. There are more than 80 schools, over 20 colleges and 21 hospitals in Biratnagar, the most after Kathmandu.

== Events and festivals ==
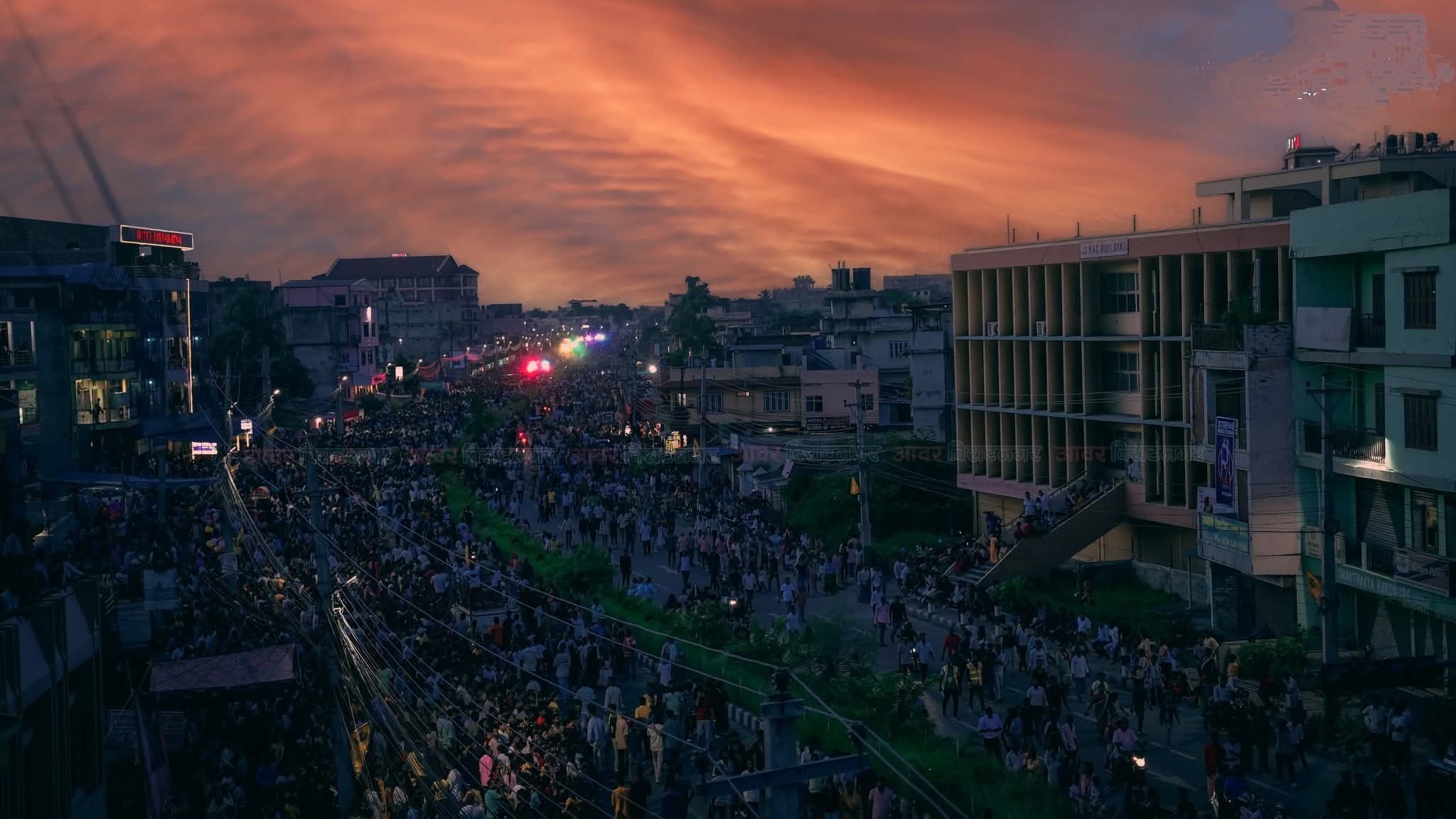
Radha Krishna Rath Yatra

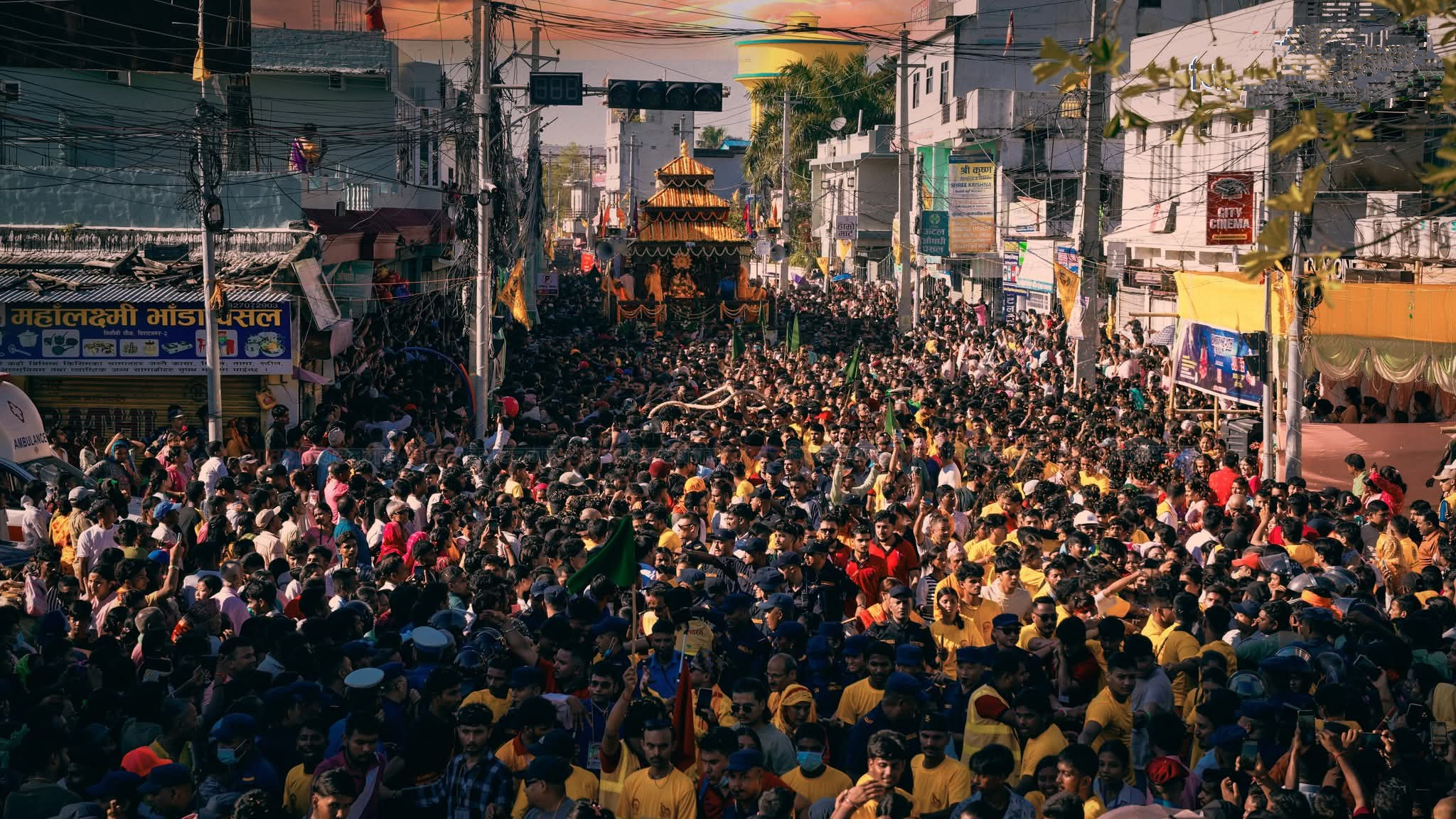
Radha Krishna Rath Yatra durin Krishna Janmastami

- The annual Biratnagar Music Festival (BMF) is one of the largest music festivals in the whole Koshi Province.
- Radha Krishna Rath Yatra during Krishna Janmashtami
- Chhath Puja
- Birat Street Festival

== Arts and culture ==
Biratnagar has been the home of many prominent literary personalities like Bishweshwar Prasad Koirala, Tarini Prasad Koirala, Dev Kumari Thapa, Bal Krishna Pokharel, Parashu Pradhan, Krishna Bhooshan Bal, Dadhiraj Subedi, Bibas Pokharel, Suman Pokhrel, Bhola Rijal, Bhuwan Dhungana and others. Some of the prominent books in Nepali literature have emerged from Biratnagar. Landmark books in Nepali poetry, Bholi Basne Bihan by Krishna Bhooshan Bal and Jeevanko Chheubaata by Suman Pokhrel were first published in this city. There is a popular culture of poetry recitation in regular sessions in various locations of Biratnagar.

Biratnagar is the birthplace of the theater group Aarohan Gurukul. The theater group was founded and registered with district administration office, Morang here in Biratnagar in 1982. The group has expanded its activities to Kathmandu and abroad. This theatre group has produced dozens of theatrical plays including Agniko Katha and Yajnaseni and has performed them across countries. Aarohan Gurukul is considered as one of the major places of public attraction in Biratnagar.

Biratnagar is also known for religious sites such as the Kali Mandir, and its diverse cultural landscape.

== Sports ==
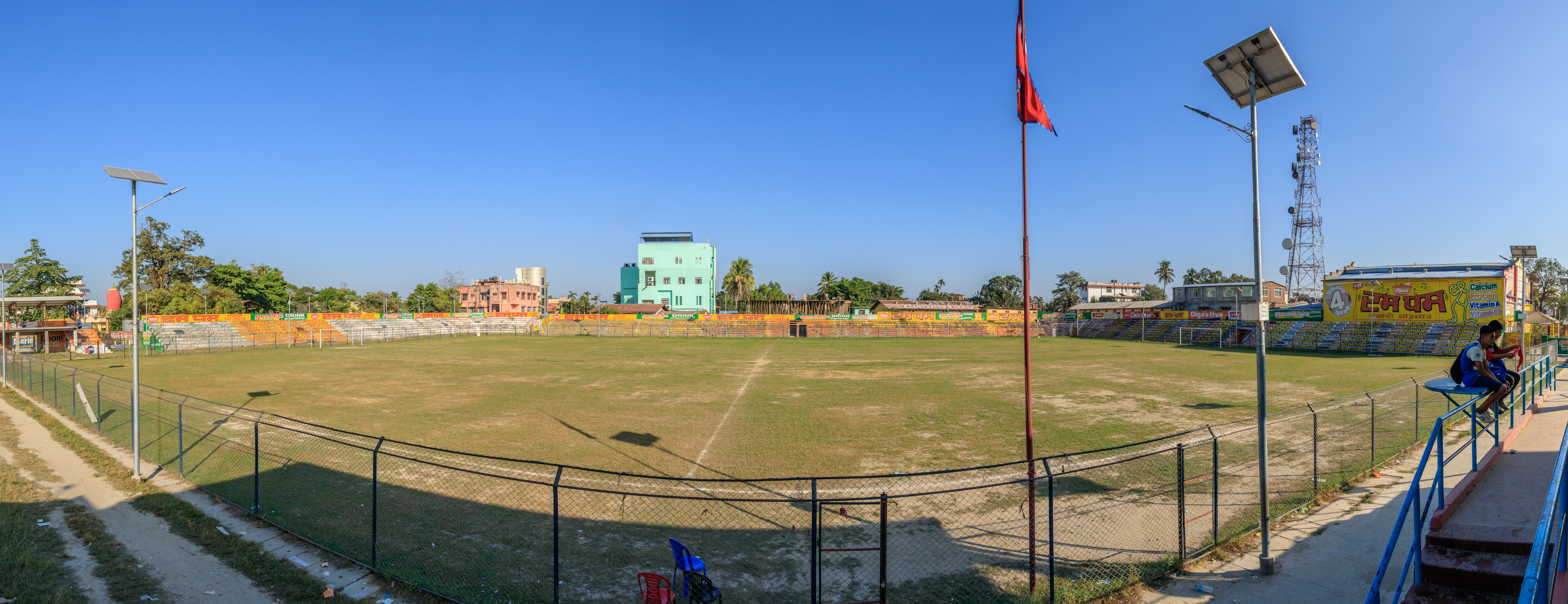
Sahid Rangsala

Cricket and association football are the most popular sports in Biratnagar. Biratnagar City F.C. is one of the heart beats of the footballing culture of the city. Sahid Rangsala with a capacity of 15,000+ spectators is the largest football stadium in the city. Sahid Maidan is the home stadium of Morang Football Club. The Mahendra Gold Cup, now Birat Gold Cup, is held in the stadium along with district divisional league matches. There is a covered hall nearby Sahid Maidan where indoor events can be organized. A cricket stadium is being constructed in Baijanathpur on the outskirts of Biratnagar with the objective of organizing local and national-level cricket tournaments. Other facilities in the city include lawn tennis and basketball courts.

Active sports teams in Biratnagar
Club	League	Sport	Venue	Established
Biratnagar City FC	NSL	Football	Sahid Rangasala	2021
Biratnagar Kings	NPL	Cricket	GP Koirala Cricket Stadium	2024
Biratnagar Bahubali	NKL	Kabaddi	—N/a	2025

== Transport ==
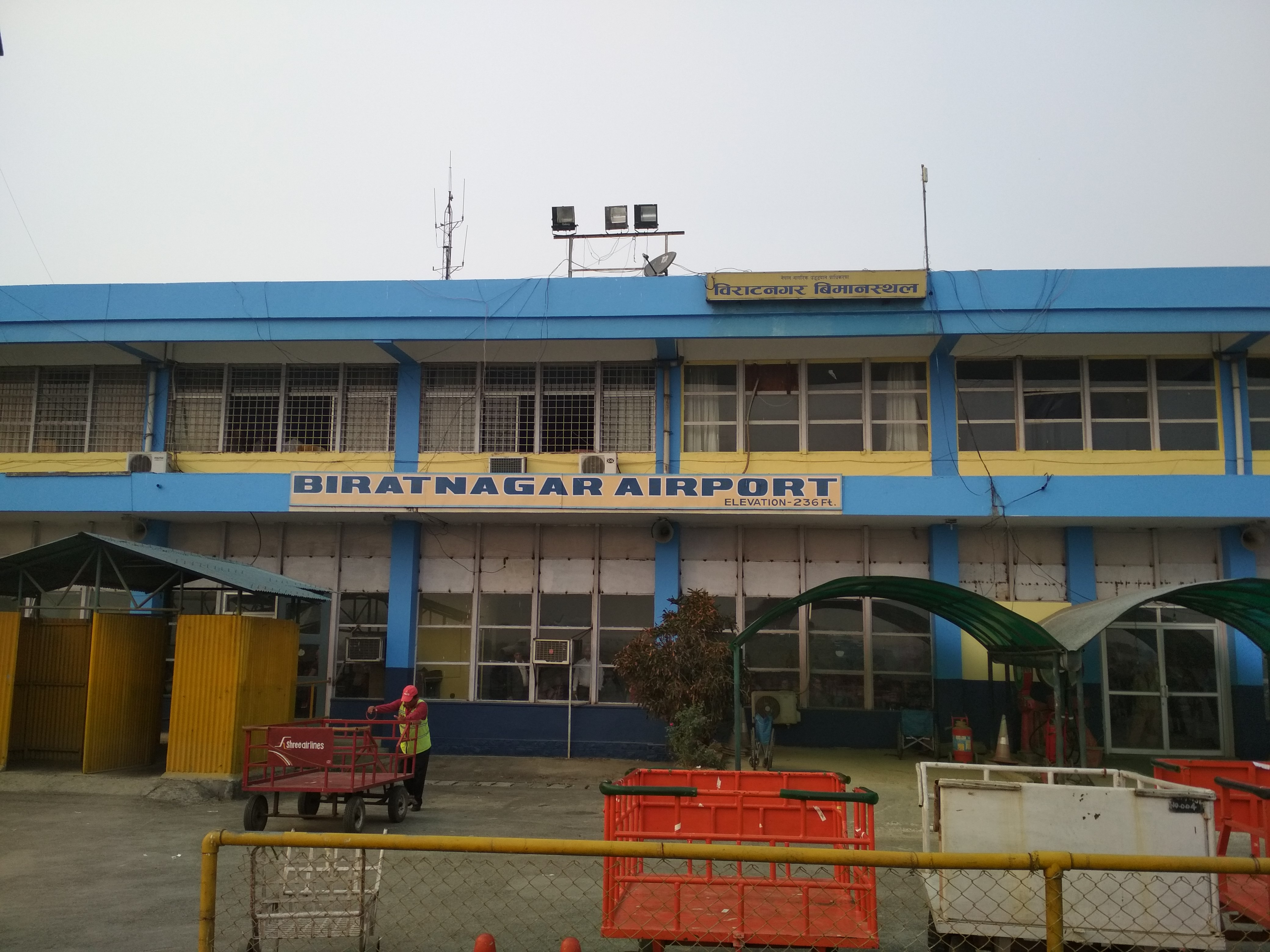
Biratnagar Airport Terminal

- Air: Biratnagar Airport serves as a regional hub for the eastern part of the country. A subtotal of 10 flights per day are operated to Kathmandu which makes it the busiest domestic airport in the country after Pokhara. Frequent flights are also operated to Tumlingtar as well as other airports within the country. The Biratnagar Airport is being developed into an international airport to cater to increasing tourist traffic and improve regional connectivity.

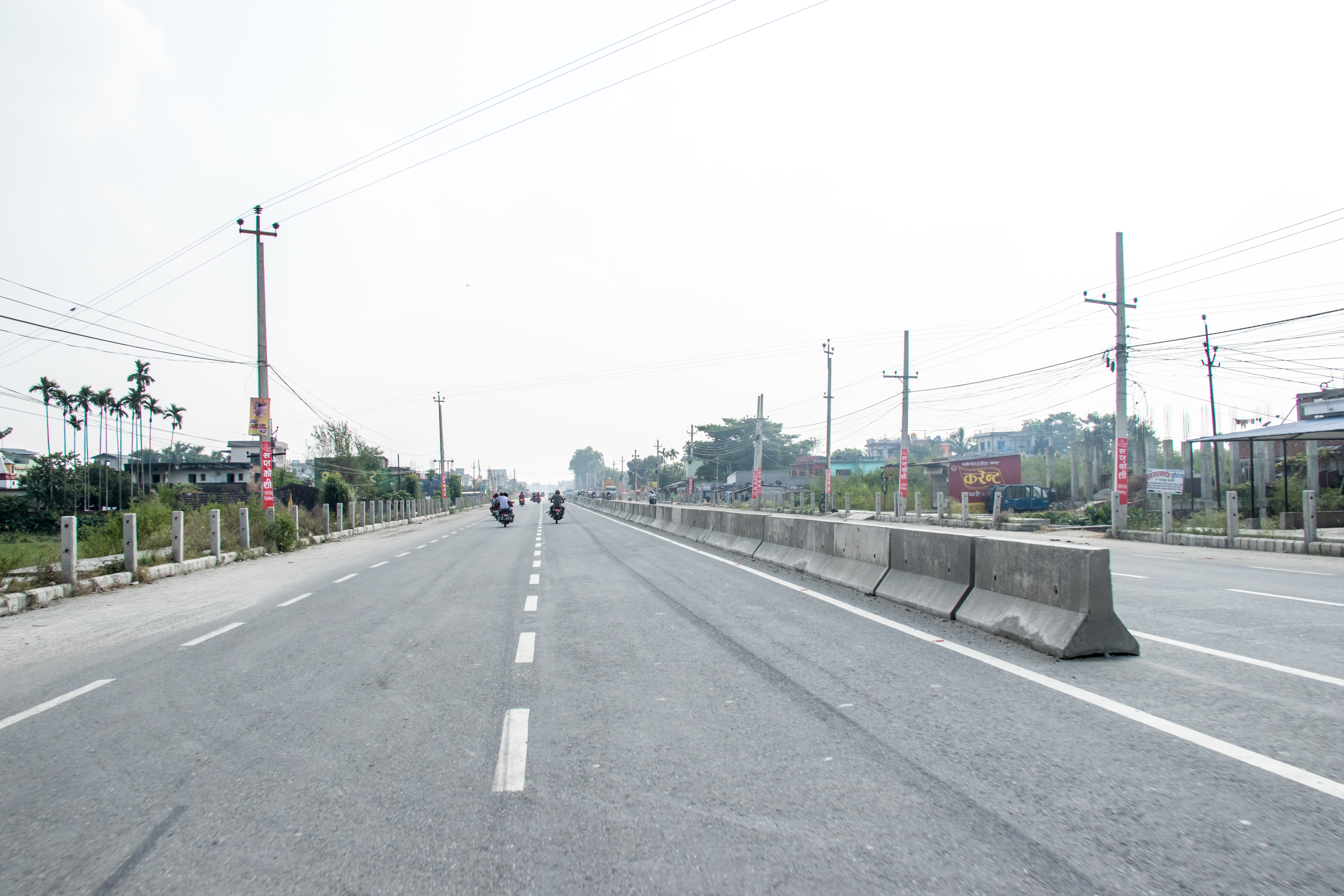
Koshi Highway across Biratnagar

- Road: Biratnagar is roughly 544 kilometres (340 mi) by road from Kathmandu. It is also well connected to all the parts of Province No. 1 including Dharan, Itahari and Dhankuta as well as to most parts of the country through regular bus service. The easternmost border-point of Kakarbhitta lies at a distance of 108 km (67 mi) from the city and can be reached via frequent buses running half-hourly from the buspark.
- Trains: There are direct trains from the Indian cities of Katihar, Kolkata, Patna, Siliguri, Raxaul, and New Delhi, to the border town of Jogbani. The rail line ends in Jogbani, Araria district on the Indian side. Biratnagar is 7 km (4 mi) north of Nepal's southern border with Bihar, India. The crossing has a customs checkpoint for goods called Rani Bhansar. Indian and Nepalese nationals cross the border freely. A monorail extension to Biratnagar has been proposed and surveyed. As of 1 August 2019, the provincial government of Province No. 1 plans to establish a monorail system running 30 km (19 mi) from Rani, Biratnagar to Itahari at an estimated budget of Rs. 30 billion.
- Intracity: Cycle, motor vehicles, rickshaws, and taxis serve the city center. Auto rickshaws (Tempos) are available for longer distances outside the center. City safari or electric rickshaws are the most used transportation here, connect all parts of Biratnagar, and are very cheap as well as environmentally friendly.

== Biratnagar Metropolitan City Logo ==
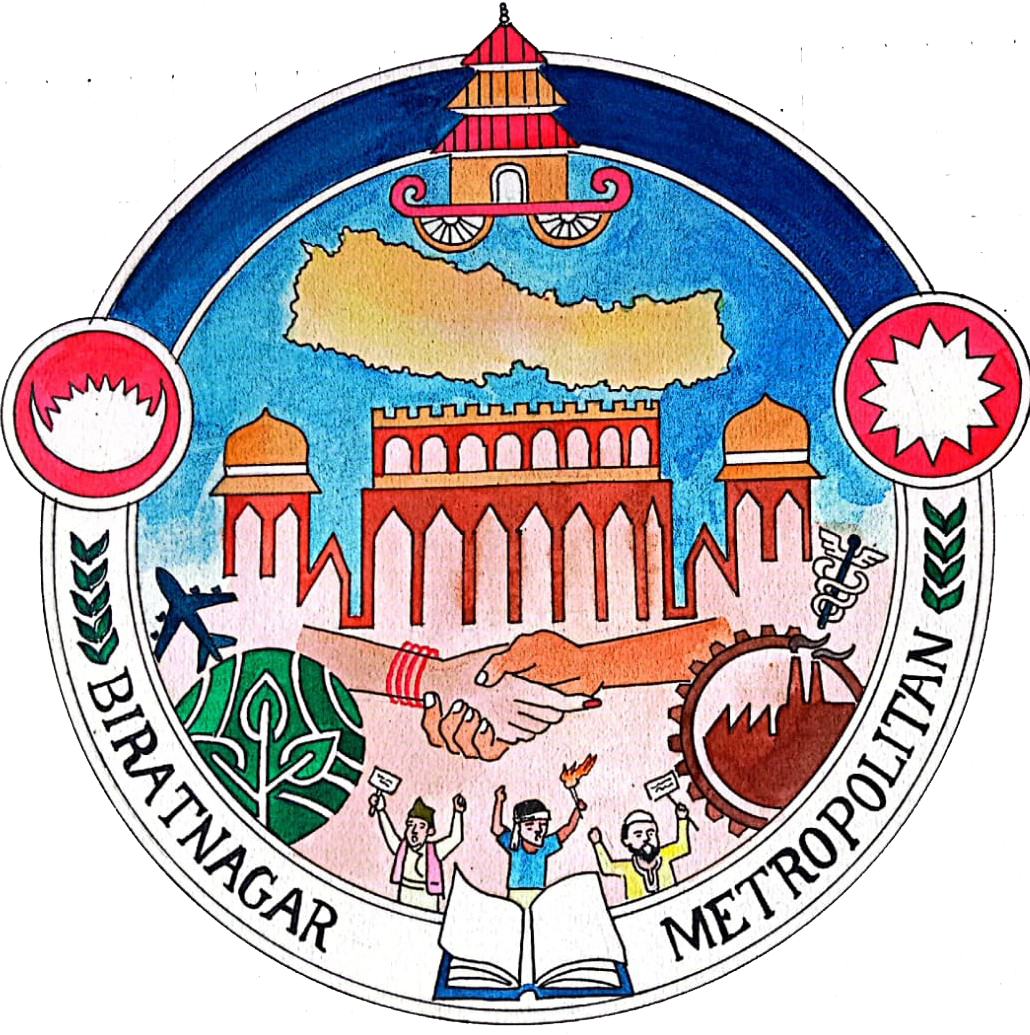
Official logo of Biratnagar Metropolitan City, designed by Nar Kumar Shrestha (Knor)

The official logo of Biratnagar Metropolitan City was selected through an open public design competition initiated by the Office of the Municipal Executive (municipal decision dated 2079-07-03 BS). The competition invited designers to submit entries reflecting the city's historical, geographical, natural, social, and cultural identity.

The competition was won by Nar Kumar Shrestha (known as Knor)., a Biratnagar-based artist, fashion designer, and entrepreneur. His design was officially adopted as the official emblem of Biratnagar Metropolitan City.

== International relations and organizations ==
=== Twin towns – sister cities ===
Biratnagar is twinned with:

- Colarado, United States
- Dortmund, Germany
- Isfahan, Iran
- Johannesburg, South Africa
- Lahore, Pakistan
- Minsk, Belarus
- Patna, India
- Xinxiang, China
- Yangon, Myanmar

== Mayors ==
Election	Mayor	Party	Tenure
2074	Bhim Parajuli	Nepali Congress	2074-2079
2079	Nagesh Koirala	Nepali Congress	2079-2084

== Notable residents ==
=== Medical professionals ===
- Bhola Rijal, gynaecologist and poet

=== Actors, actresses and comedians ===
- Ranu Devi Adhikari, singer
- Manisha Koirala, Bollywood actress
- Sushila Koirala, classical dancer, theater director, and wife of Bishweshwar Prasad Koirala
- Arunima Lamsal, actress
- Shilpa Maskey, actress
- Deepa Shree Niraula, actress
- Suman Pokhrel, poet, lyricist, playwright
- Sunil Pokhrel, actor
- Shiv Shrestha, actor

=== Politics ===
- Mahesh Acharya, Nepali Congress politician
- Shailaja Acharya, Nepali Congress politician and former DPM
- Bharat Mohan Adhikari, CPN (UML) leader
- Man Mohan Adhikari, 31st prime minister of Nepal
- Yuvaraj Adhikari, Nepali Congress leader
- Sushila Karki, first female prime minister of Nepal.
- Bishweshwar Prasad Koirala, 22nd prime minister of Nepal and a psychoanalytic writer
- Girija Prasad Koirala, 30th prime minister of Nepal
- Matrika Prasad Koirala, 18th prime minister of Nepal
- Shekhar Koirala, Nepali Congress politician
- Sujata Koirala, Nepali Congress leader
- Sushil Koirala, 37th prime minister of Nepal
- Tarini Prasad Koirala, Nepali Congress leader
- Lal Babu Pandit, Nepal Communist Party politician
- Amod Prasad Upadhyay, Nepali Congress politician
- Upendra Yadav, People's Socialist Party, Nepal politician

=== Sports ===
- Siddhant Lohani, cricketer
- Lalit Narayan Rajbanshi, cricketer, Nepal cricket team
- Bhola Silwal, footballer

== See also ==
- 2022 Biratnagar municipal election
- Girija Prasad Koirala Cricket Stadium
