= Labour laws in Nepal =

Labour laws in Nepal are regulated primarily by 2015 Constitution of Nepal which has guaranteed freedom of work as fundamental rights of the citizen. The Constitution has guaranteed right to choose and practice any profession or carry on any occupation under 2(f) of Article 17 Right to freedom. Nepal joined the International Labour Organization in 1966 and has recognized eleven ILO Conventions. The conventions cover International labour standards and fundamental rights at work; Tripartite partnerships and social dialogue; Inclusive employment, social protection and sustainable enterprises; Child and forced labour; Labour migration, fair recruitment and rights of migrant workers; Occupational safety and health and Care economy. Nepal has reflected the ratified conventions via several laws.

== Labour specific acts ==
There are specific acts regulations and bylaws provisioned to regulate, facilitate and govern the labour right. Labour Act is main act whereas, some other domain specific acts regulate those issues. Foreign Employment Act, 2064 (2007), Right to Employment Act, 2075 (2022), Child Labour (Prohibition and Regulation) Act, Social Security Act, 2075 (2018), Trade Union Act etc are acts related to labour right. Economic and cultural rights for non resident Nepalses is guided by NRI Laws. Workplace Protection & Human Rights Sexual Harassment at Workplace (Prevention) Act, 2014 (2071 BS) has guarranted the protection of workplace.

Similarly there are few Industry & Sector-Specific Regulations related to labour rights. Working Journalists Act, 1993 (2051 BS); Foreign Employment Act, 2007 and Special Economic Zone (SEZ) Act, 2016 (2073 BS) are prominent ones.

The government has provisioned regulations to regulate labour rights provided by the laws. Regulations state detail procedures to practice the provisions of the acts. Labour Rules, 2018; Labor Court Rules, 1995; Contribution-Based Social Security Regulations, 2018; Bonus Act, 1974 (2030 BS); Bonus Rules, 1982 (2039 BS) are some examples.

== Enforcing and monitoring agencies ==
The Ministry of Youth, Labour, and Employment (MoYLE) is the main entity to formulate policies, implement and supervise. Public institutions like Federation of Nepalese Chambers of Commerce and Industry (FNCCI) and trade union associations like All Nepal Federation of Trade Union (ANTUF), General Federation of Nepalese Trade Unions (GEFONT), Nepal Trade Union Congress (NTUC) are agencies to advocate and organize in favour of the labour rights.

== Labour movements ==
Legal obligations have enabled the workers awareness to their rights which are reflected by various protests. Existence of collective bargain agencies encouraged them to bargain for increment of facilities. On the ground of the legal provisions eglected informal sector workers seem demanding fulfilment of their Rights.

Several small and large scale protests were made in Nepal. Some major protests held in Nepal left big political change in the country. The following are some of the remarkable protests.

- Biratnagar Jute Mill Strike
- April 1992 Nepalese general strike
- 2025 Nepal Teachers' Protest

== Criticism ==
The practice of labour right and regulation of them is still in development phase, the existing laws and practice is criticized to be inadequate to cover the informal sector. However the labour laws have given some provisions of social security of the labour, they are still focused upon informal sector. It covers approximately 10-20% of formal sector of Nepal labour market.

== See also ==
- Labour Court of Nepal
