= Nepal National Teachers Association =

Trade union in Nepal

NNTA
- Nepal National Teachers Association
- Founded: 1979
- Location: Nepal
- Members: 72,000+ (2017)
- Affiliations: GEFONT, Confederation of Nepalese Teachers, Education International

The Nepal National Teachers Association (NNTA) is an organization of teachers' trade unions in Nepal. The NNTA was established in 1979, registered under the Educational Act, and became a trade union. As of 2017, it has 72,000 members. NNTA has established international relation and is the first member to the WCOTP from Nepal, and a charter member to Education International (EI) global union federation. NNTA is also affiliated or has working relationships with trade unions and professional organizations in Nepal and worldwide. NNTA is affiliated with the Communist Party of Nepal (Unified Marxist–Leninist).

The 12th national general convention of the NNTA took place from 30-31, May 2018. A 33-member central working committee was elected at the convention. The gathering elected Laxman Sharma as NNTA chairperson.

== See also ==
- Nepal Teachers Association
