= Ranu Devi Adhikari =

Nepali singer (1936–2020)

- Born: 27 November 1936; Birgunj, Nepal
- Died: 30 April 2020 (aged 83) Sinamangal, Kathmandu, Nepal
- Occupation: Singer

Ranu Devi Adhikari (Nepali: रानुदेवी अधिकारी) (27 November 1936 – 30 April 2020) was a singer of Nepal. She was also one of the prominent leaders of the Nepali Congress party. She was the first female singer of Radio Nepal. She used to sing revolutionary songs like "Jaago Nepali" on radio Nepal, to ignite fire in the hearts of the Nepalese people during the times of oppression.

== Early life ==
She was born on 27 November 1936 in Birgunj. She grew up in Benaras, India.

She was the younger sister of the late Nona Koirala. She, along with her sister, brother-in-law Yuvaraj Adhikari and other members of the Koirala family were part of the revolution that led to the ultimate downfall of the Rana regime.

Ranu Devi was also a history teacher at Ballika Vidyalaya in Biratnagar.

She married Tirtha Prasad Adhikari. She had three children, namely Archana Sharma, Alpana Regmi, and Avin Adhikari.

She died on 30 April 2020 at KMC Hospital, Sinamangal, Kathmandu.
