= Mahendra Morang Adarsh Multiple Campus =

Campus affiliated with Tribhuvan University

Coordinates: 26°26′44.4″N 87°16′25.7″E

- महेन्द्र मोरङ आदर्श बहुमुखी क्याम्पस
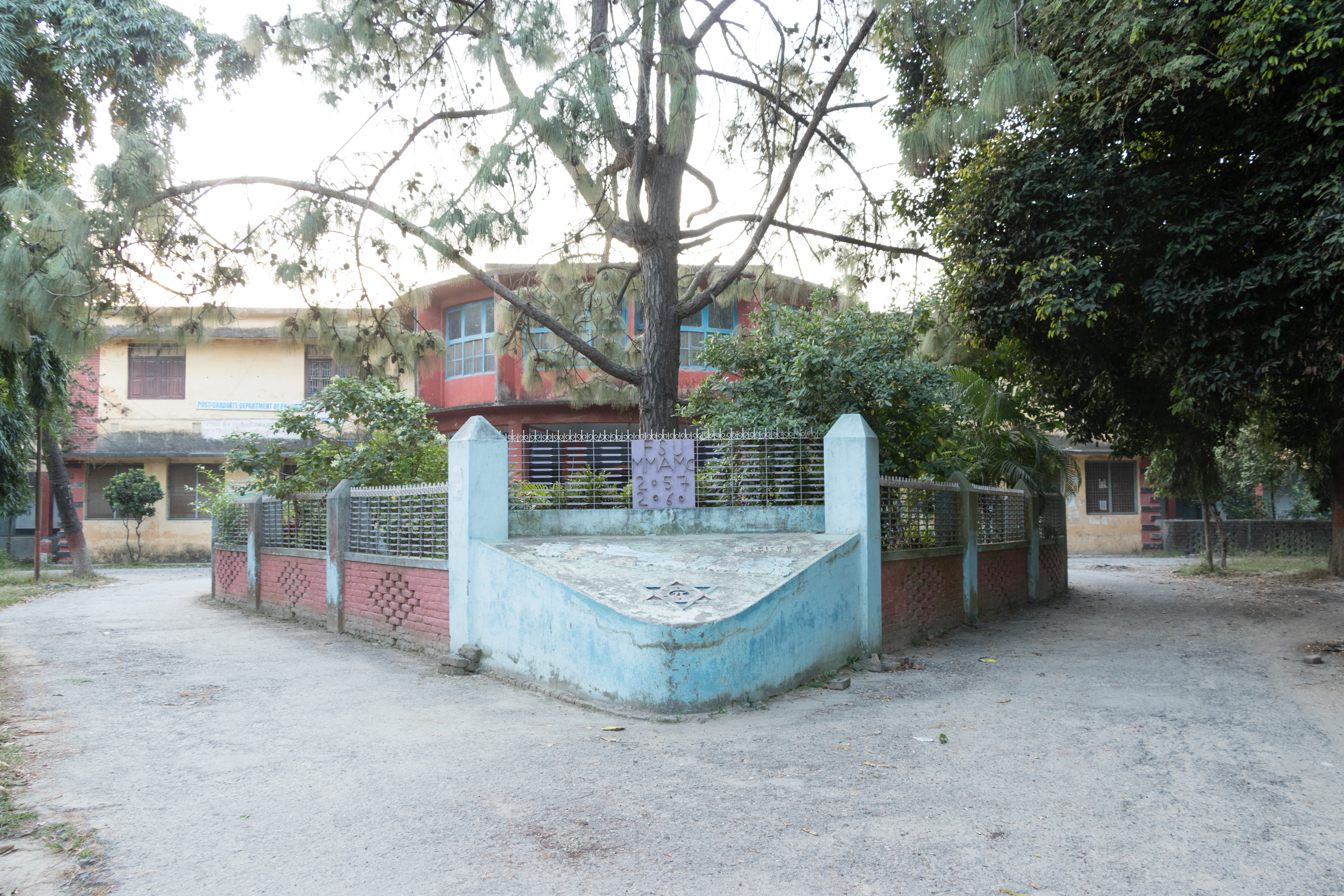
- Other names: MMAMC
- Type: Public
- Established: 1955 (2012 B.S.)
- Affiliations: Tribhuvan University
- Budget: n/a
- Campus chief: Dr. Ramawatar Sharan
- Academic staff: 165
- Students: 3234
- Location: Biratnagar, Morang, Nepal
- Language: Nepali, English
- FSU chairman: Jaswant Paudel (NSU)
- Website: mmamc.tu.edu.np

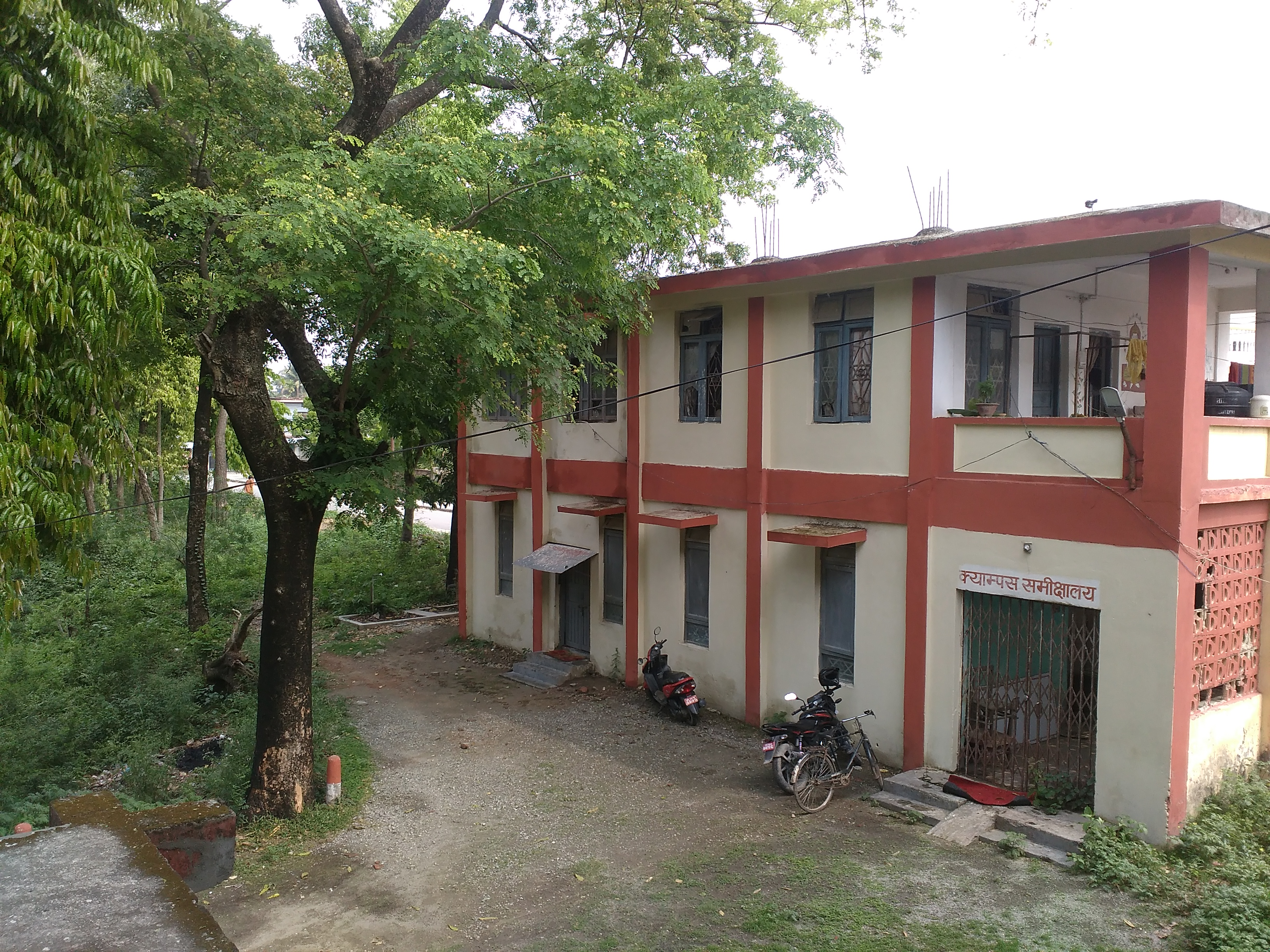
MMAMC Review Room

Mahendra Morang Adarsh Multiple Campus (Nepali: महेन्द्र मोरङ आदर्श बहुमुखी क्याम्पस) is a constituent campus of Tribhuvan University in Biratnagar, Morang. Established in 1955 as 'Morang Intermediate College', it is one of the oldest constituent campuses of Tribhuvan University in the district. There are 165 academic staffs and 3234 students studying in the college. On 15 April 2018, Tribhuvan University elected the college administration led by Dr. Babu Ram Timalsina, who is often referred to as "Campus Chief".

== History ==
Mahendra Morang Adarsha Multiple Campus is the constituent campus of Tribhuvan University in Province No. 1. It was established in 2012 B.S. as 'Morang Intermediate College' and it has come a long way since then. In the very first year of its establishment, the campus was able to record hundred per cent result in the faculty of humanities. Established before Tribhuvan University, Mahendra Morang Adarsh Multiple Campus has a notable history for serving the education in Nepal. The construction of the campus building completed in 2018 B.S. After the inauguration of the building in 2020 B.S. by King Mahendra, the Morang college administration sent a request letter to King Mahendra to add Mahendra before the name of the college. After receiving the approval on the 3rd of Magh 2022 B.S, the word 'Mahendra' was incorporated to the name of the campus on the 6th of Chaitra,2024 B.S.;being 'Mahendra Morang College'. With the implementation of the new education system in 2028 B.S., Tribhuvan University converted it into its constituent campus. After merging with Adarsh Mahabidhyalaya, the campus was named as Mahendra Morang Adarsh Multiple Campus.

== MMAMC Library ==
Mahendra Morang Adarsh Multiple Campus has its own library. Students have access to book facilities and it assists them with their study. The campus has one main library and several departmental libraries.

== Notable alumni ==
Some of the eminent graduates of the college include:

1. Bidhya Devi Bhandari, 2nd President of Nepal
2. Sushila Karki, 24th Chief Justice of the Supreme Court of Nepal and interim Prime Minister of Nepal
3. Shekhar Koirala
4. Giriraj Mani Pokharel

== Gallery ==
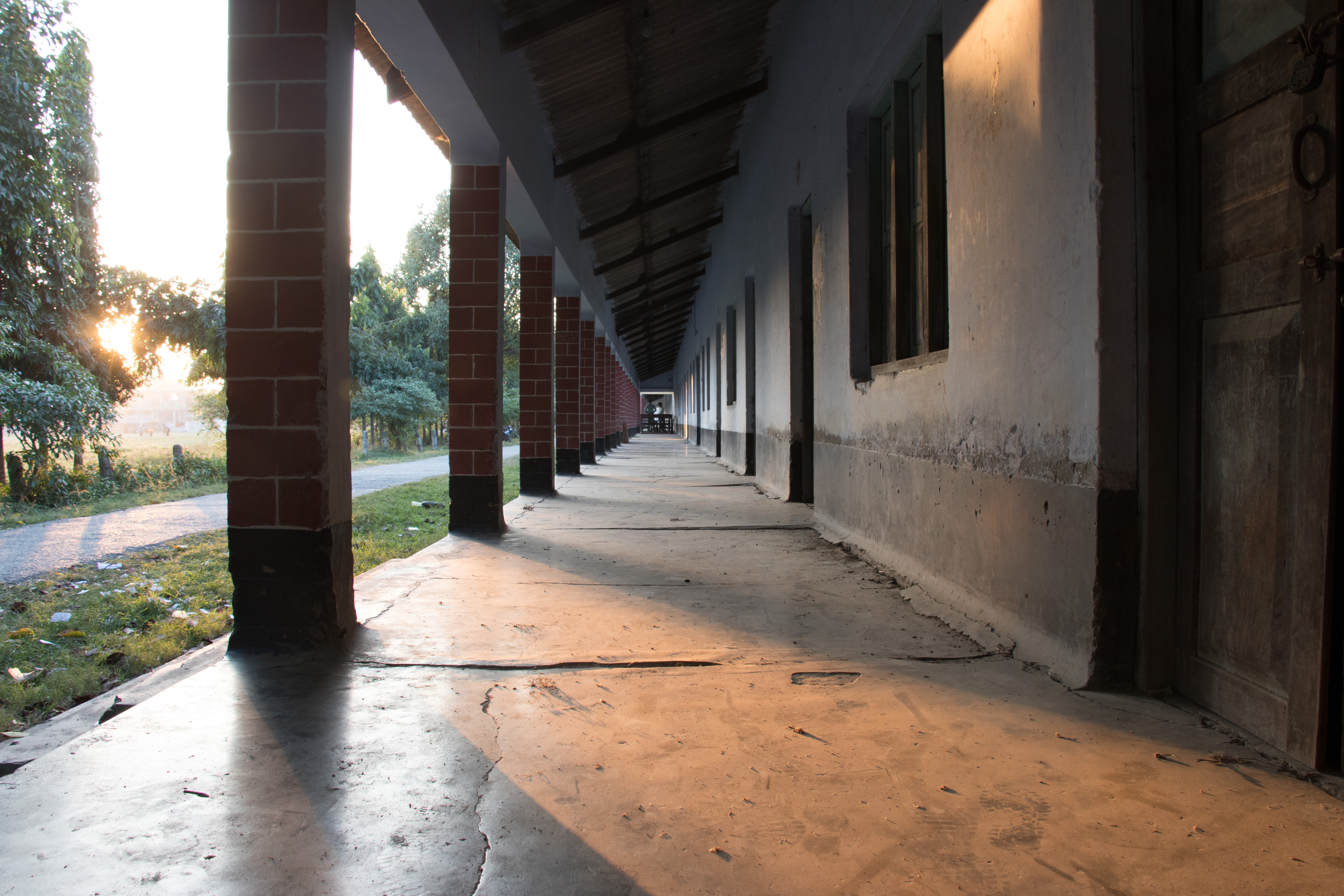

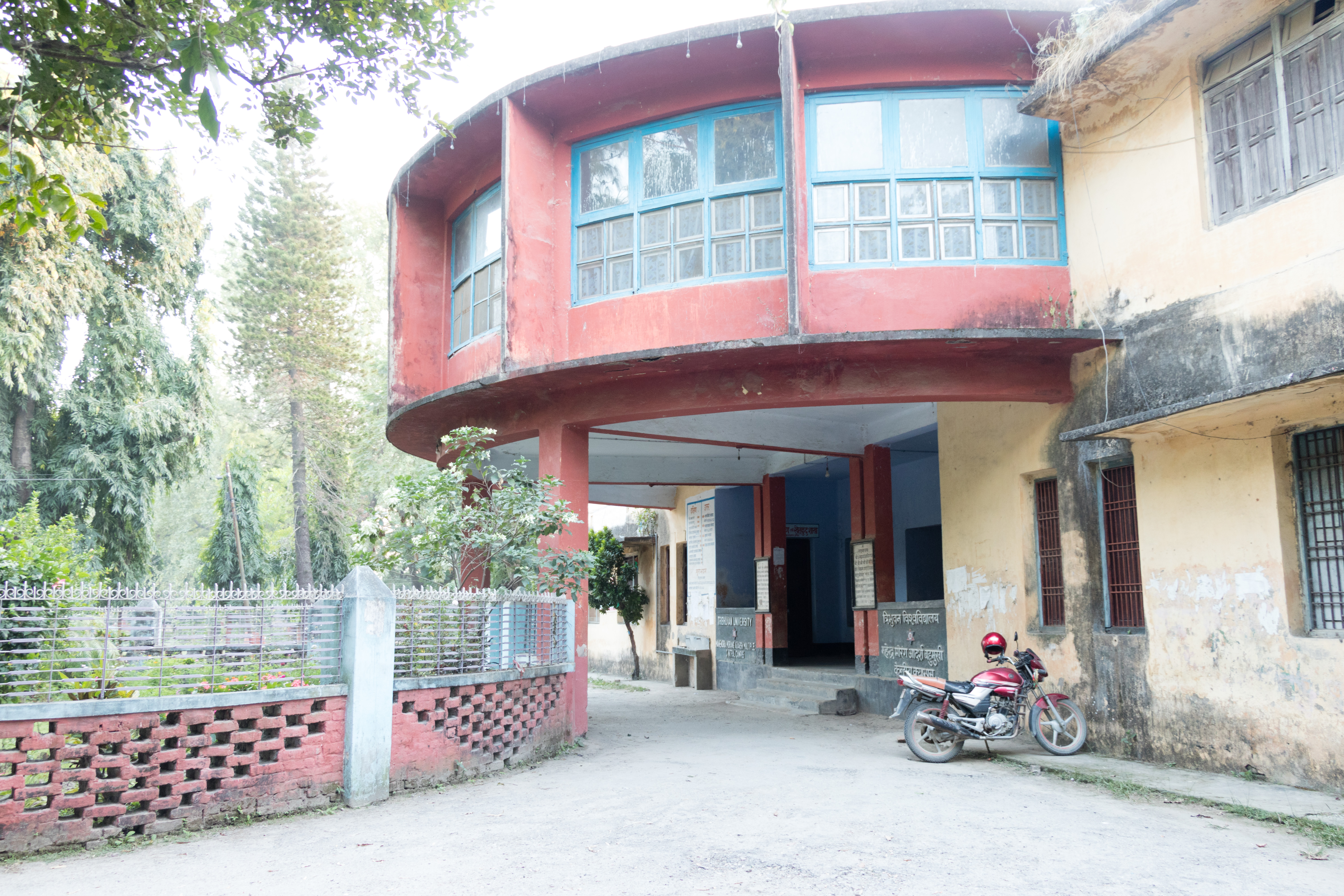
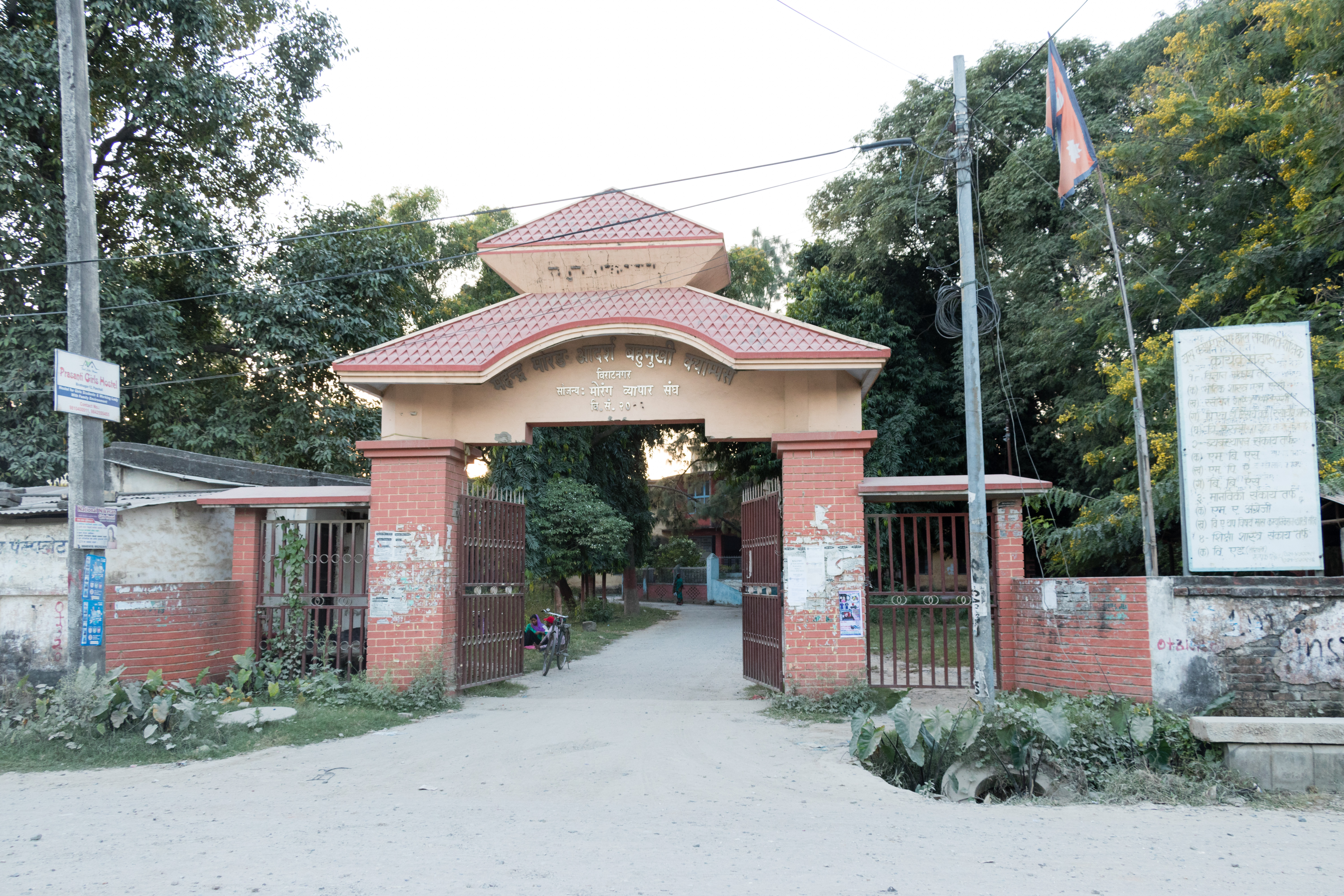
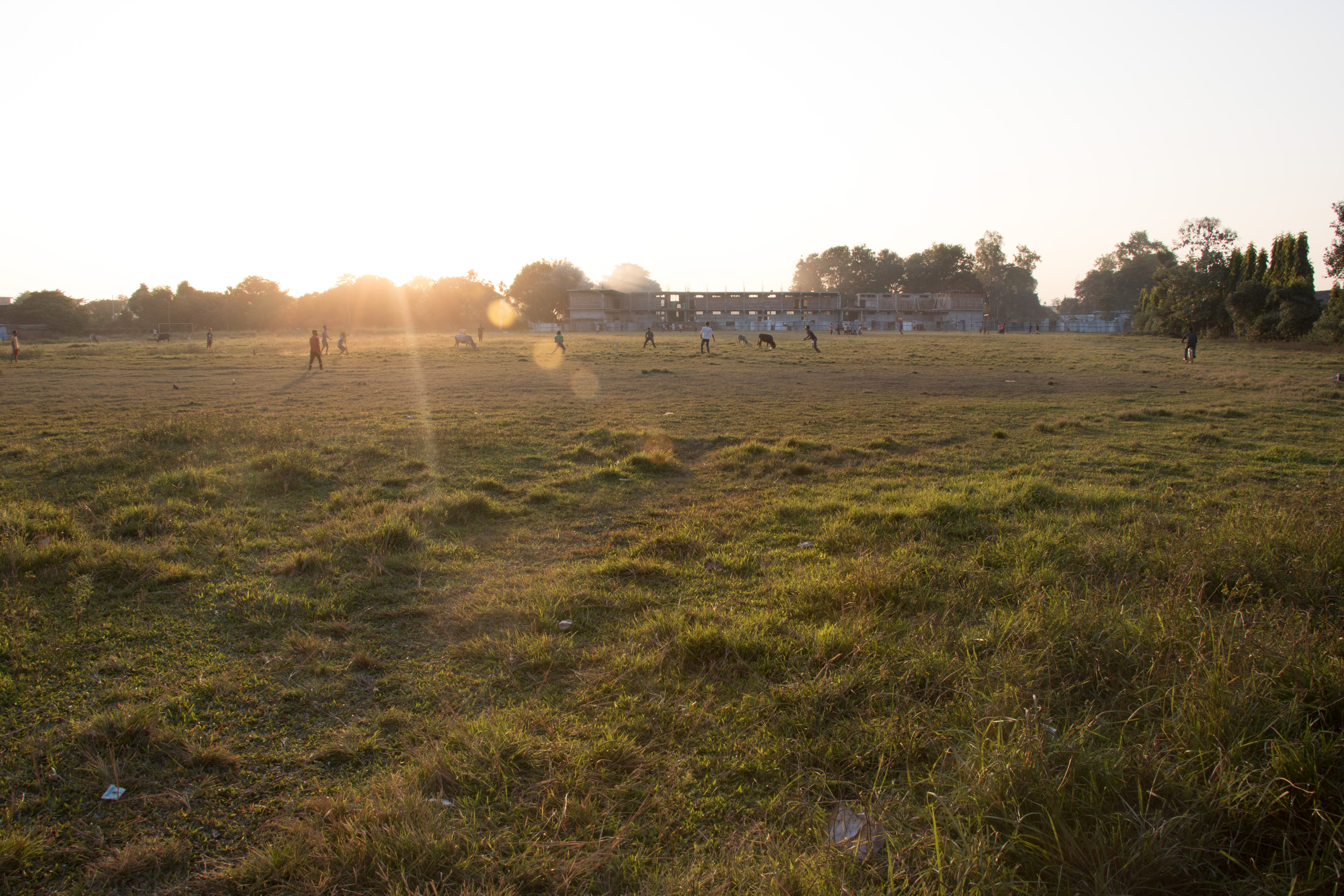

== See also ==
- List of universities and colleges in Nepal
