= Gopal Fun Park =

Park in Nepal

Gopal fun Park
- Interactive map of Gopal fun Park
- Location: Rangeli Road, Katahari
- Nearest city: Biratnagar
- Coordinates: 26.4603683°N 87.3076172°E
- Open: 6:00-18:00

Gopal Fun Park is a privately owned park located about 1 km from Hatkhola, Biratnagar, Nepal. The park has an area of 13 bighas (approximately 2.1 ha) out of which 3 bhigas is occupied by a pond. The park has boating, rope climbing, and children entertainment facilities. The park was established in December 2017 at a cost of NPR 130,000,000.

== Notable events ==
- In January 2019, an Indian actress Rakhi Sawant performed in this park along with other local artists.
