= 2025 Nepal Teachers' Protest =

Education protest in Nepal

The 2025 teachers' movement in Nepal was a nationwide protest led by public school teachers from across the country. A Kathmandu-centered peaceful protest began on 2 April 2025. The agitation was called by the Nepal Teachers' Federation, demanding the swift passage of the School Education Bill. During the protest, teachers demanded the implementation of previous agreements reached with the government. The teachers' key demands included job security, salary and benefits, and social security, as well as revocation of the authority over teacher management that had been granted to local levels.

== Background ==
After the Constitution of Nepal came into effect in 2015, the government—in implementing the federal governance system—delegated the authority over teacher management and recruitment, which was devolved to local levels. Teachers' associations had criticized the new arrangement of managing teachers by local governments. These associations argued that the arrangement led to widespread interference, political pressure, and increased inequality. There was also widespread dissatisfaction with the proposed Education Bill 2024, because this bill appeared not to address the expectations of the teaching community.

== Demands ==
The teachers' movement, which was led by the Federation of Nepal Teachers, gradually spread across the country. Schools were closed, and teaching was affected. The main demands of the movement included the following:

- Guarantee of employment security for temporary, contract and relief teachers.
- Equality in salary and service facilities (for civil servants).
- Inclusion of all teachers in the Social Security Fund.
- Teacher management authority should be on the federal level.

== Protest Diary ==
A peaceful demonstration called by the Federation of Nepal Teachers started in Kathmandu, demanding immediate passage of the Education Bill. The federation issued a press release demanding that the education bill be introduced in parliament immediately to end the agitation. On the day of Nepali New Year (1st Baisakh), a notable number of teachers protested from Maitighar to New Baneshwor. This protest made public transportation chaotic. The minister of education, Bidya Bhattarai, resigned on 21 April. The National Exam Board postponed the Class 12 Exam that was scheduled to start on 24 April. The Board postponed the exam after the direction from Prime Minister K. P. Sharma Oli on 22 April. On 27 April, the 26th day of the agitation, clashes broke out during a demonstration in the Singhadurbar area of Kathmandu. Twenty-seven teachers, a journalist and security personnel were injured in these clashes. On 30 April, talks held between Education Minister Raghuji Panta and the Federation of Nepal Teachers resulted in an agreement. Both parties signed a nine-point agreement, and the agitation was postponed. The main points of the agreement included employment security for teachers, recognition of previous agreements, and passage of the education bill.
