= Arunima Lamsal =

Nepalese actress

- Born: 20 August 1981 (age 44); Biratnagar, Nepal
- Height: 5 ft 3 in (160 cm)
- Children: 1 (daughter)

Arunima Lamsal is a Nepalese American actress.

== Partial filmography ==
=== Actress ===
Films
Year	Title	Role	Awards and nominations
	Abhimanyu		
	Aafno Manche Afnai Hunchha		Samjhana Digital Film Awards best supporting actor (female)
	Agni Jwala		
	Jyoti (Tele serials)		
	Anadi Kheladi		
	Bazar		
	Bharosha		
	Buwa Aama		
	Carreng Gang 2		
	Daag IS BEST......		
	Dai Ko Sasurali		
	Deep Sikha		
	Dhadkan		
	Ghayal		
	K Yo Maya Ho		
	Kanoon		
	Maryada		
	Mr. Mangale		
	Nigrani		
	Izzatdaear		
	Mero Pyaro Maitighar		
	Mero Rajesh Dai		
	Ram Balaram		
	Santan (new)		
	Yestai Rahecha Jindagi		
