= Biratnagar Jute Mill =

Nepalese jute mill

Biratnagar Jute Mill is the biggest and oldest jute mill in Nepal. It was established under Prime Minister Juddha Shamsher Rana in 1936 A.D. The mill was initially run by the Government but later handed over to a private company for operation. The mill has a history of shutting down multiple times due to political situation. The mill is mostly remembered for initiating the democracy movement against the Rana dynasty in Nepal. The mill is also a tourist attraction for locals due to its long history.

== History ==
Birat Biratnagar Jute Mill was Nepal's first production factory established in 1936. The Birat Jute mill was run by the government till the 1990s. In 2002, during the policy of privatization, the factory was handed to Arihant Multi-fibre, a subsidiary of Golchha Organization. However, the company failed to run the factory due to political intervention and labour problems. Consequently, the government decided to shut down the factory by paying off NPR 550 million to its 2,000 employees.

In 2014, the factory was handed over to a Kolkata-based company named Winsome International. But again, it was soon closed. The factory reopened in January 2016 but it shut down again due to managerial issues. The private company instead of running the factory, tried to sell the land of the mill in 2017 which was halted by government. The Supreme Court ruled in behalf of the private company but the actual sell did not occur. The factory resumed producing twine and jute sacks again on September 11, 2018.

== Facilities ==
Apart from the main factory the mill has the following facilities:

- a Power House for electricity generation,
- multiple store houses
- railway yard connecting Jogbani Railway Station
- sports facility for employees including a lawn tennis
- a Hindu temple of Lord Hanuman
- employees quarters
- a garage
- guest house

== Political Significance ==
The mill is remembered as the initiation place for democracy in Nepal. A demonstration began on March 4, 1947, under the leadership of Girija Prasad Koirala, initially, demanding labour rights, but later political trade union rights were also demanded. The Nepali Congress supported the strike. On March 9, Bishweshwar Prasad Koirala joined the strike with his supporters and the strike grew in number. The Rana dynasty regime sent state troops to Biratnagar to put down the strike and the strike ended after arresting the leaders. However, some of those leaders escaped to India. The Nepali congress held a conference in Jogbani, India and resolved to initiate a nationwide Satyagraha, or civil disobedience movement. This sparked the countrywide anti-Rana demonstration.
