= Federation of Nepalese Journalists =

Nepali trade union

The Federation of Nepalese Journalists (FNJ, Nepali: नेपाल पत्रकार महासंघ) is a nationwide organisation of journalists in Nepal. FNJ is a member of the International Federation of Journalists.

== History ==
In 2008 leadership elections elected Dharmendra Jha as FNJ president, Poushan K.C. as General Secretary, Gobinda Acharya as Vice President, Ramji Dahal as Secretary, and Ramesh Bista as Treasurer.
