= Nepali New Year =

Traditional Nepali holiday

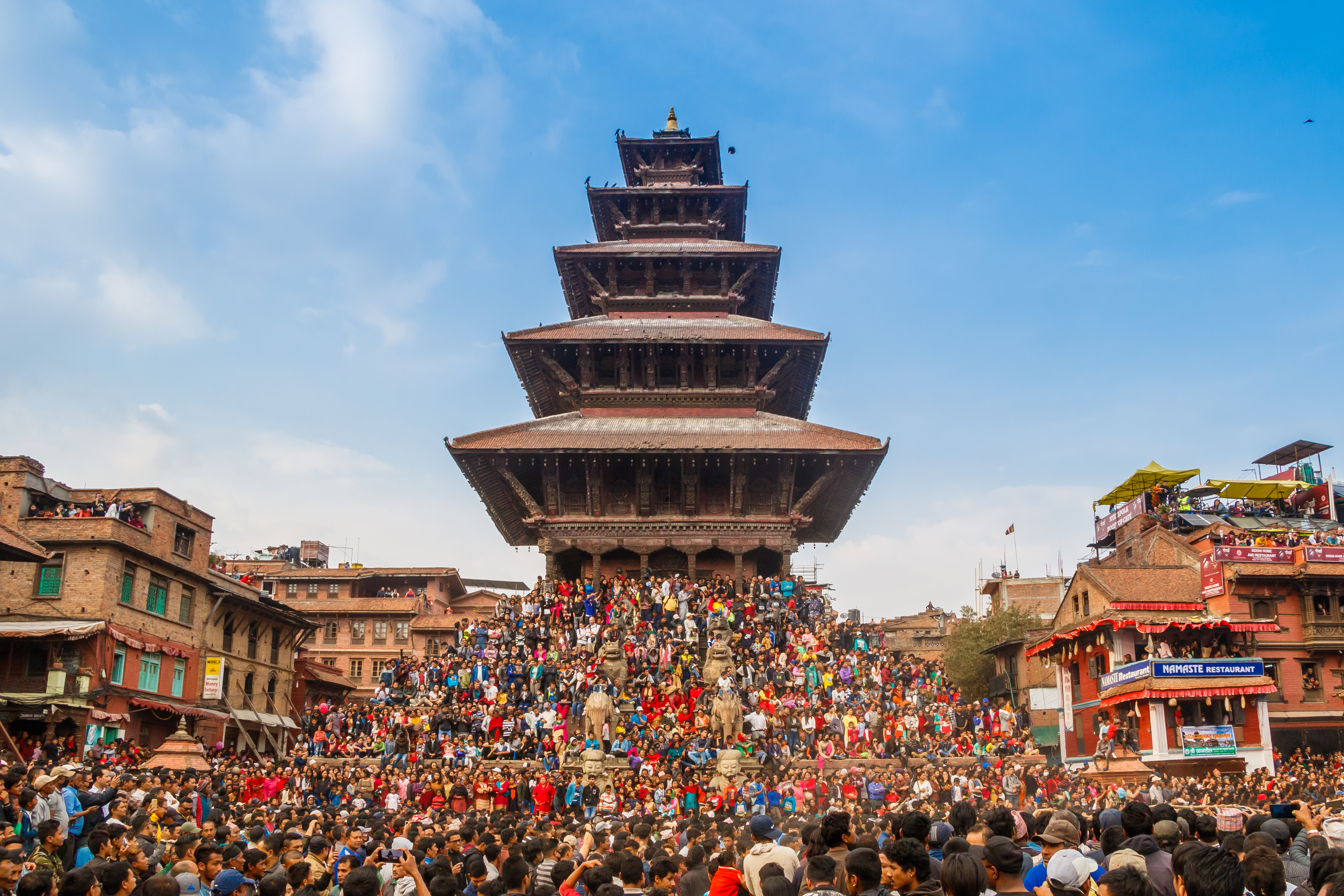
- People gathering in Nyatapola Temple to celebrate Bisket Jatra
- Observed by: Nepalis
- Type: Cultural, Religious
- Significance: Marks the first day of the Vikram Samvat calendar
- Date: Chaitra Krishna Pratipada (1st day of the Nepali month of Baisakh)
- Frequency: Annual

Nepali New Year, also known as Naya Barsha, marks the beginning of the Bikram Sambat (BS) calendar, which is the official calendar of Nepal. Unlike the Gregorian calendar, the Bikram Samvat calendar runs about 56–57 years ahead. For example, while it is 2026 in the Gregorian calendar, Nepal is currently on 2083 BS.

Despite Nepal's multicultural society, all communities come together to celebrate the beginning of the year in their own ways.

== Bisket Jatra ==
Bisket Jatra (or Biska Jatra) is one of Nepal’s most vibrant and ancient festivals, celebrated primarily in Bhaktapur to mark the arrival of the Nepali New Year. Spanning nine days, it is a high-energy blend of mythology, religious devotion, and community rivalry.
