= Confederation of Nepalese Teachers =

Coalition of Nepalese teacher unions

CNT
- Confederation of Nepalese Teachers
- Formation: 2015
- Type: Trade union
- Location: Nepal

The Confederation of Nepalese Teachers (CNT) is a confederation of public school teacher unions in Nepal. The CNT was formed as a merger of the three largest coalitions of teacher unions in the country, which were themselves previously divided by political party. The union aims to protect the rights and welfare of Nepalese teachers and has previously struck for the rights of temporary workers and engaged in education reform.

== History ==
In 2001, the Education Act was amended to guarantee the right of teachers to organize and participate in a union, declaring "There shall be a teachers' union to promote the professional rights and welfares of the teachers." After this amendment was passed, teachers began working to form a national teachers' union. At the time, the teachers' labour movement was heavily divided by ideology, and three new coalitions of teacher unions were formed along party lines.

The three coalitions first began working together in 2014, having come to the conclusion that no party properly represented their interests as teachers and that ideological divisions only hindered their work. After collectively organizing protests in September 2014, the three coalitions opted to dissolve themselves in February 2015 and form the Confederation of Nepalese Teachers, accounting for 16 unions altogether. The new CNT adopted the motto "Teacher's unity for rights and responsibilities."

In 2017, the CNT was working to inform and promote the adoption of education reform at the legislative level in Nepal.

== Structure ==
The Confederation of Nepalese Teachers is a coalition of 16 unions. It exclusively serves teachers in Nepalese public schools; private school teachers are served by the Institutional School Teachers' Union (ISTU) which is not a member of the CNT.

== Activities ==
=== 2014 temporary worker protests ===
In September 2014, the three major teacher union coalitions of Nepal which would go on to form the Confederation of Nepalese Teachers organized their first action together. At the time, 50000 teachers worked in Nepalese schools on temporary contracts with unequal pay, benefits and retirement packages. The coalitions protested this inequality by padlocking the doors to the office of the national Department of Education office and all 75 District Education offices.

In response to the protests, in July 2015, the Ministry of Education and Teachers Service Commission offered the temporary workers a promise of priority full-time hiring and a limited retirement payout.

=== 2023 education bill protests ===
In September 2023, the CNT protested against the government's new education bill.

== See also ==
- Nepal Teachers Association
- Unified All Nepal Teachers Association
