= Yuvaraj Adhikari =

Nepali politician

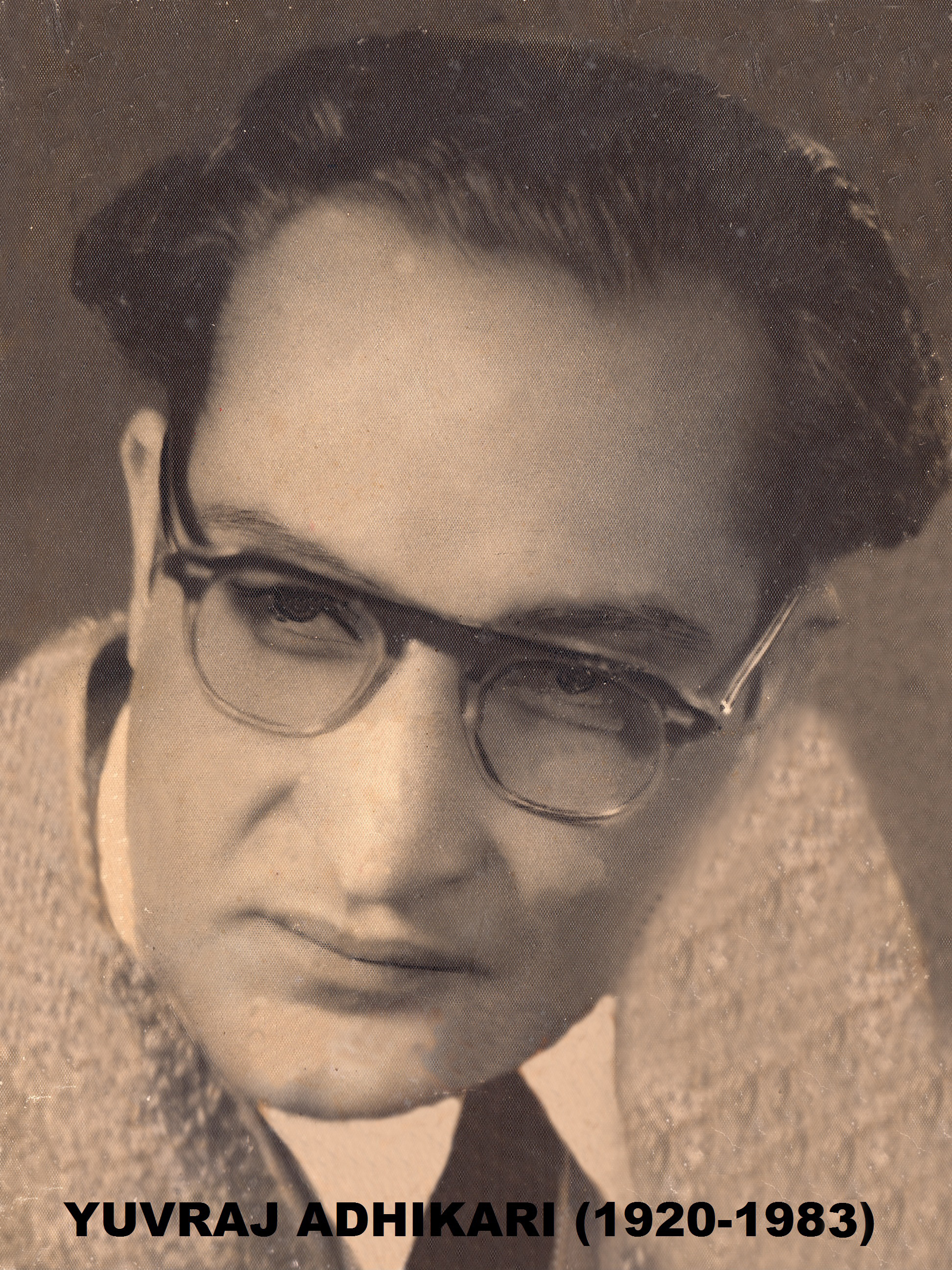

Yuvaraj Adhikari (Nepali: युवराज अधिकारी) (1920–1983) was a Nepalese politician belonging to the Nepali Congress Party (NCP) . He was in the forefront of the leaders who took part in 1947 Biratnagar jute mill strike along with Girija Prasad Koirala, Tarini Prasad Koirala and Man Mohan Adhikari.

He was among the six National Congress leaders i.e. Bishweshwar Prasad Koirala, Girija Prasad Koirala, Tarini Prasad Koirala, Gehendrahari Sharma, Manmohan Adhikari who were taken to Kathmandu as the prisoners of conscience from Biratnagar via the land routes. It took 24 days for them to reach Kathmandu on foot, and they were jailed at a Sundarijal-based prison after completing the walk. He was in active role in and after abolition of Rana rule. Later he was arrested and imprisoned by King Mahendra following the 1960 royal coup. Upon his release, Adhikari, was exiled to India along with other leaders and workers of the party and returned home following a government to grant him amnesty. He was then involved in underground politics to abolish the Panchayati regime.

== See also ==
- Biratnagar jute mill strike
- Revolution of 1951
- Bishweshwar Prasad Koirala
- Manmohan Adhikari
