= Unified All Nepal Teachers Association =

Nepalese trade union

UANTA
- Unified All Nepal Teachers Association
- Type: Trade union
- Location: Nepal
- Members: 45,000 (2017)
- Affiliations: Communist Party of Nepal (Maoist Centre)

The Unified All Nepal Teachers Association (UANTA) is a trade union of teachers in Nepal. The union is affiliated with the Communist Party of Nepal (Maoist Centre). As of 2017, it has 45,000 members. Shanker Adhikari is the chairman of the union.
