= Biratnagar Jute Mill Strike =

1947 labor strike in Nepal

1947 Nepal Jute Mill Strike
- Date: March 4, 1947
- Location: Biratnagar, Morang, Nepal
- Goals: Trade Union Right
- Result: mass increase on anti Rana Regime protest

Parties
Leaders of Nepali Congress	Rana Authorities Nepal

The Biratnagar Jute Mill Strike (Majdur Hartal) of March 1947 was a labor strike in Biratnagar, Nepal, by workers and laborers of Biratnagar Jute Mill, Ltd. The strike was initially part of a dispute between mill workers and management regarding labor rights, but gradually the strike grew into a nationwide anti-regime movement.

== Background ==
According to the mill workers, living and working conditions in the mill were extremely poor, with no labor rights and no running water in living quarters.

== Strike ==
The demonstration started on March 4, 1947 under the leadership of Girija Prasad Koirala, along with Tarini Prasad Koirala, Man Mohan Adhikari, and Yuvaraj Adhikari, as employees in the mill. The strike was launched with initial demands purely based on labor rights, but later the workers also demanded political trade union rights. The Nepali Congress supported the strike at Biratnagar. On March 9, Bishweshwar Prasad Koirala joined the strike with his supporters and the strike grew in number. The Rana dynasty regime sent state troops to Biratnagar to put down the strike. The strike ended when the troops reached Biratnagar after they arrested the leaders. Some of these leaders escaped capture by fleeing to India. Six National Congress leaders (Bishweshwar Prasad Koirala, Girija Prasad Koirala, Tarini Prasad Koirala, Gehendrahari Sharma, Manmohan Adhikari and Yubaraj Adhikari) were walked to Kathmandu as prisoners. The Nepali Congress held a conference in Jogbani, India and resolved to initiate a nationwide Satyagraha, or civil disobedience movement. Thus, the countrywide anti-Rana demonstration started.

== Aftermath ==
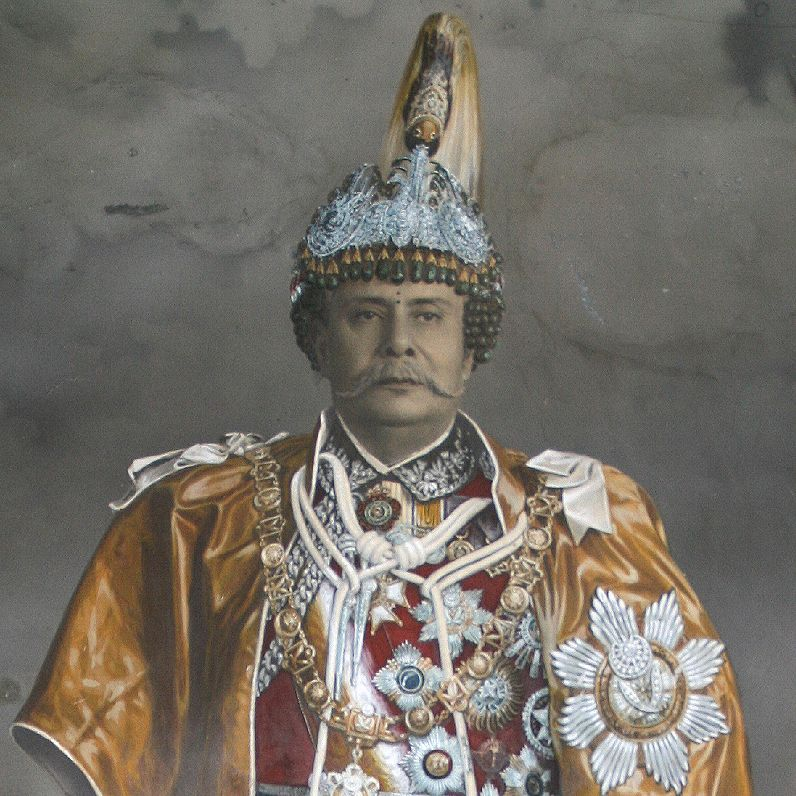
Padma Shamsher Jang Bahadur Rana

== See also ==
- Bishweshwar Prasad Koirala
- History of Nepal
- Rana dynasty
- Nepali Congress
