= Nepal Teachers Association =

Trade union in Nepal

Nepal Teachers' Association
- Nepal Teachers' Association
- नेपाल शिक्षक सङ्‍घ
- Founded: 1950 (1990)
- Founder: Ramji Prasad Sharma
- Location: Nepal
- Members: ▲85,000+ (2017)
- Chairman: Soma Nath Giri
- Senior deputy chairman: Illam Bahadur Shahi
- General Secretary: Gyanendra Bahadur Rawal; Nirmala Koirala
- Parent organization: Nepali Congress
- Affiliations: Confederation of Nepalese Teachers, Education International, NTUC

The Nepal Teachers Association (NTA) is a trade union for teachers in Nepal. It is the first and the most influential organization of teachers' association in Nepal. The NTA was established in 1950 and registered under the educational act of that time, and then become a trade union in 1990. As of 2017, it has over 85,000 members.

NTA is also affiliated or has working relationships with the trade unions and professional organizations in Nepal and around the world. NTA has a close relationship with the Nepali Congress.

The national general convention of the NTA took place on 14 April 2022. A 33-member central working committee was elected at the convention. The gathering elected Somnath Giri as NTA chairperson.

== Leadership ==
=== Chairman ===
- Somanth Giri

=== Senior deputy chairman ===
- Illam Bahadur Shahi

=== Deputy chairman ===
- Dhankala Bhandari
- Birendra Kumar Khadka
- Chotelal Prasad Teli Sah
- Sundar Panta
- Laxmi Prasad Regmi
- Deepak Gyanwali
- Bhagwati Shrestha
- Khadka Bahadur Khadka

=== General secretary ===
- Gyanendra Bahadur Rawal

=== General finance secretary ===
- Nirmala Koirala

=== Deputy general secretary ===
- Narayan Prasad Timalsina
- Gita Siwakoti
- Teertha Raj Prasad Yadav
- Naidu Kumari Nepali
- Kali Bahadur Shahi
- Sita Devi Thapa
