= List of prime ministers of Nepal =

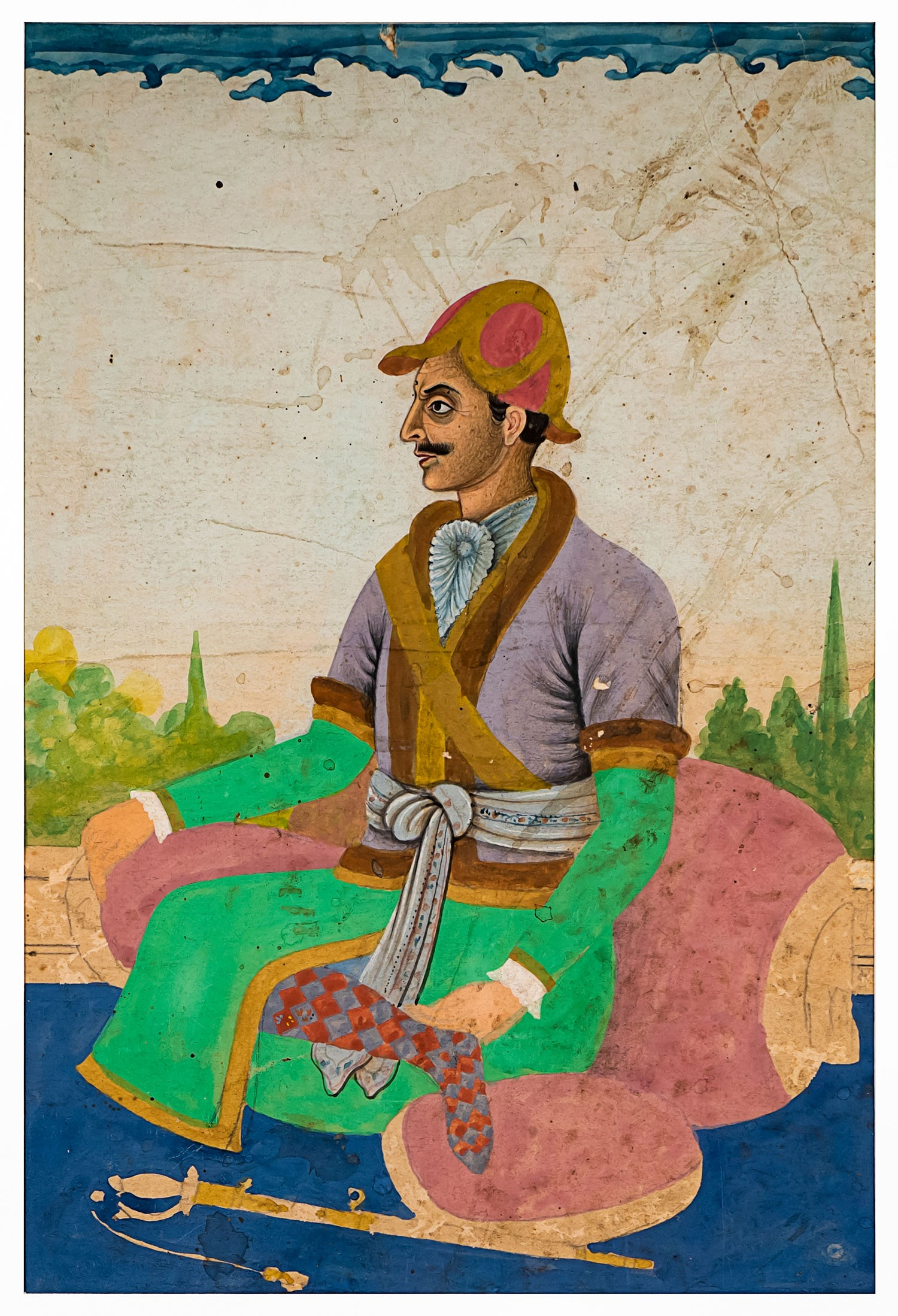
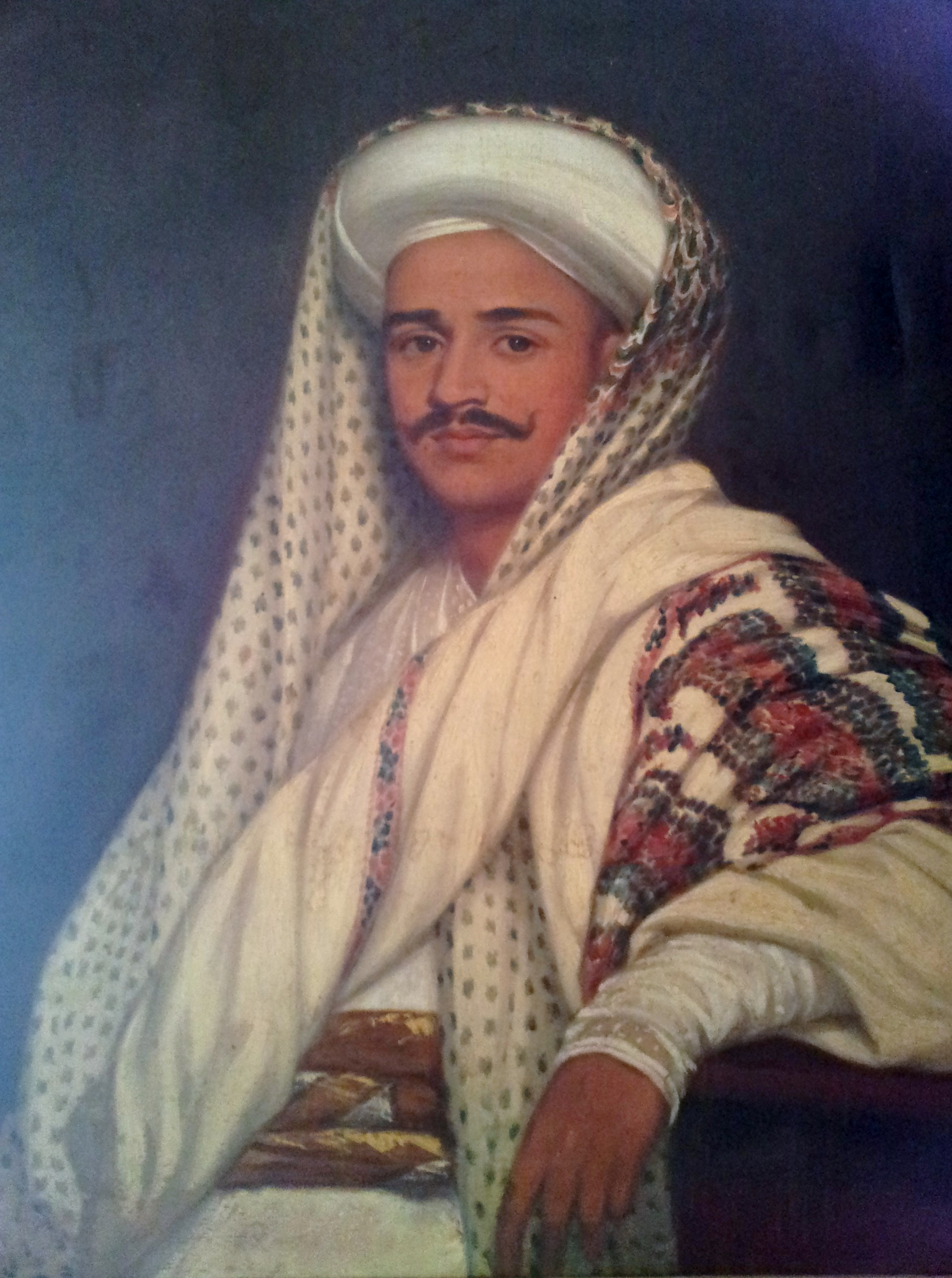
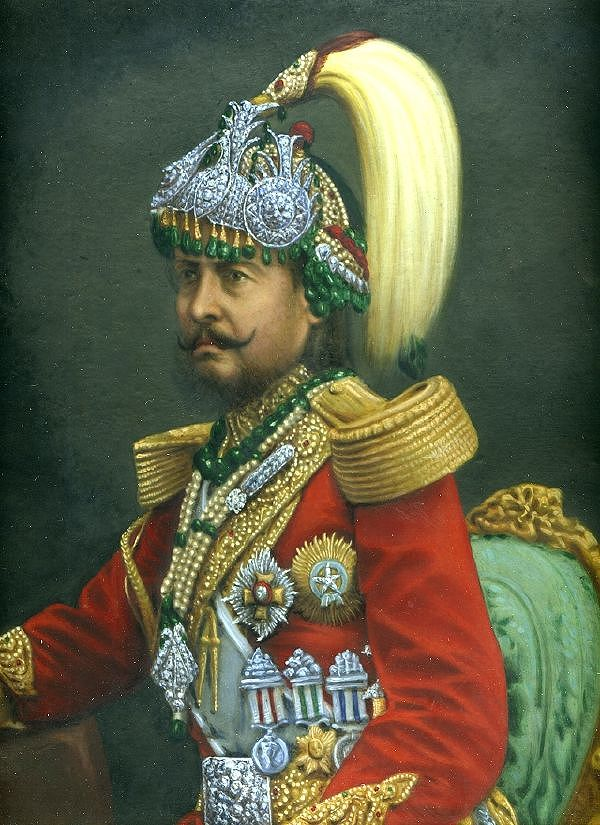
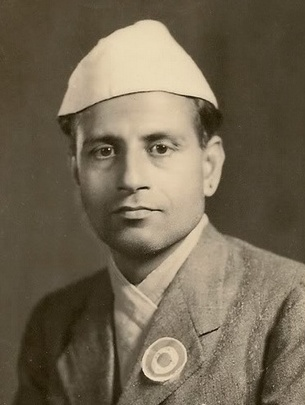
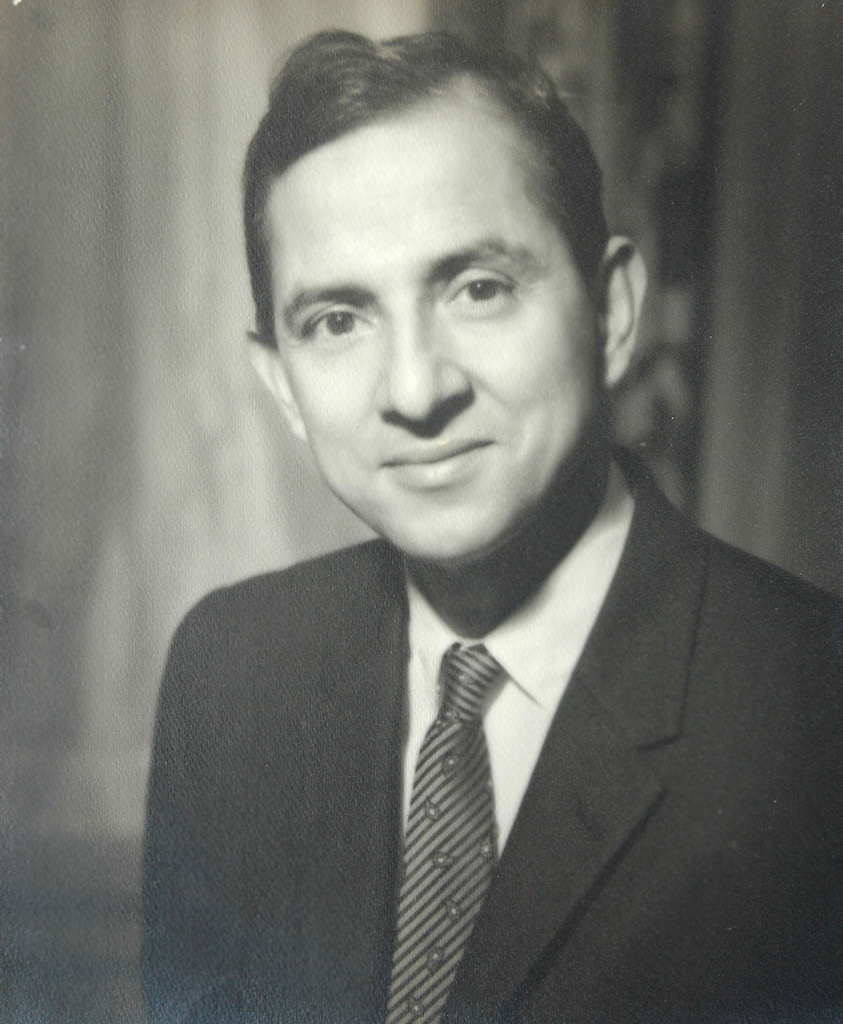
Key figures in the history of the prime ministership of Nepal.
- Top left: Bhimsen Thapa, the first and longest-serving Prime Minister (serving 31 years as Mukhtiyar).
- Top centre: Ranga Nath Poudyal, the first Khas Brahmin Prime Minister of Nepal, who served twice as Mukhtiyar.
- Top right: Jung Bahadur Rana, the founder of the Rana dynasty and the first Rana Prime Minister of Nepal.
- Bottom left: Matrika Prasad Koirala, the first commoner Prime Minister after the fall of the Rana regime in 1951.
- Bottom right: B. P. Koirala, the first Prime Minister of Nepal to be democratically elected.

The prime minister of Nepal is the head of government of the Federal Democratic Republic of Nepal and the chairperson of the Council of Ministers. Although the president of Nepal is the constitutional head of state, symbolizing the unity of the nation, in practice the executive authority is exercised by the prime minister and the Council of Ministers.

The prime minister is typically the leader of the political party (or coalition) that commands a majority in the House of Representatives (Pratinidhi Sabhā), the lower house of the Federal Parliament of Nepal. The prime minister and the Council of Ministers are collectively responsible to the Federal Parliament, specifically the House of Representatives. The prime minister must be a member of the House of Representatives. The prime minister ranks third in the Nepalese order of precedence, following the president and the vice president.

The prime minister leads the Council of Ministers and holds the chief executive authority in the country. The prime minister must command the confidence of the House of Representatives to remain in office. Under Article 76 of the Constitution, the president appoints as prime minister the leader of the parliamentary party that commands a majority in the House of Representatives. If no single party holds a clear majority, the president appoints a member of the House who can command majority support with the backing of two or more parties. If that is not possible, the leader of the largest party is appointed, who must then secure a vote of confidence within 30 days.

The prime minister informs the president about resolutions of the Council of Ministers, bills to be introduced in Parliament, and other important matters including the general state of the country and foreign relations. The official residence of the prime minister is at Baluwatar, Kathmandu, while the Prime Minister's Office operates from Singha Durbar.

== History of the office ==
The position of prime minister of Nepal in its modern form has been known by different names throughout Nepalese history. During the early period of the Shah dynasty, the Mulkajis (Chief Kajis) or Chautariyas served as heads of the government in a council consisting of 4 Chautariyas, 4 Kajis, and other officers. These Bharadars (state officers) were drawn from aristocratic families such as the Pande, Basnyat, and Thapa families. The nobility of the Gorkha Kingdom was mainly composed of Chhetri, Brahmin, and Thakuri families, who held a strong presence in civil administration.

In 1804, a single authoritative position of Mukhtiyar was created by Rana Bahadur Shah, which carried the executive powers of the nation. The Mukhtiyar held the position of head of the executive until the adoption of the title of Prime Minister in November 1843 by Mathabar Singh Thapa who became Mukhtiyar as well as the prime minister and the chief of the Nepalese Army. During the Rana dynasty, the position of Prime Minister was hereditary and the officeholder held additional titles — Maharaja of Lamjung and Kaski, Supreme Commander-in-Chief of Nepal and Grand Master of the Royal orders of Nepal.

After the 1950–1951 revolution, non-aristocratic citizens such as Matrika Prasad Koirala held the position of Prime Minister still under the authority of the King of Nepal. The first general election was held in 1959 and B. P. Koirala became the first elected Prime Minister of Nepal. However, he was deposed and imprisoned in the 1960 coup d'état by King Mahendra who went to establish the Panchayat system and Nepal did not return to democratic government until 1990. After the Jana Andolan movement in 1990, the Kingdom of Nepal became a constitutional monarchy, and Krishna Prasad Bhattarai became the Interim Prime Minister. However, this was interrupted by the 2005 coup d'état by King Gyanendra. After the Loktantra Andolan movement in 2006, the monarchy was abolished on 28 May 2008 by the 1st Constituent Assembly and Nepal was declared a federal parliamentary republic. The current Constitution of Nepal was adopted on 20 September 2015, with K. P. Sharma Oli serving as the first prime minister under the new constitution.

Between 1776 and 1951, a total of 24 individuals served as heads of government prior to the establishment of democracy. Of these, 20 were from the Chhetri community, including all 11 hereditary prime ministers of the Rana dynasty, as well as nine others from prominent aristocratic families such as the Pande, Basnyat, and Thapa families. The remaining four comprised two Thakuri of royal lineage (Chautariya), Pushkar Shah and Fateh Jung Shah, one Khas Brahmin, Ranga Nath Poudyal, whose father and grandfather were also prominent courtiers of the royal court (Kot), and one Magar, Sarbajit Rana Magar.

Since the end of the Rana regime and the introduction of democracy in 1951, a total of 25 individuals have held the office of Prime Minister. Of these, 24 have been men and one has been a woman. In terms of social background, 14 have been Khas Brahmin, 4 have been Khas Chhetri, 3 have been Khas Thakuri, 2 have been Newar, 1 have been Sanyasi/Dasnami, and 1 have been Madheshi.

== Heads of government of the Kingdom of Nepal (1776–2008) ==
=== Early administrative era (1776–1806) ===
No.	Portrait	Name (Birth–Death)	Term of office		Title	King (Reign)
No.	Portrait	Name (Birth–Death)	Took office	Left office	Title	King (Reign)
1		Vamsharaj Pande (1739–1785); 1st time	c. 1776	c. 1779	Dewan (Note: The document dated Bikram Samvat 1833 Bhadra Vadi 3 Roj 6 (i.e. Friday 2 August 1776), shows that both Swaroop Singh Karki and Vamsharaj Pande had carried the title of Dewan (equivalent to Prime Minister).)	Pratap Singh Shah (1775–1777)
2		Swarup Singh Karki (1751–1785)	c. 1776	c. 1777	Dewan (Note: The document dated Bikram Samvat 1833 Bhadra Vadi 3 Roj 6 (i.e. Friday 2 August 1776), shows that both Swaroop Singh Karki and Vamsharaj Pande had carried the title of Dewan (equivalent to Prime Minister).)	Pratap Singh Shah (1775–1777)
3		Sarbajit Rana Magar (1750–1778)	c. 1777	c. 1778	Kaji/Mulkaji (Note: Historian Dilli Raman Regmi asserts that Sarbajit was chosen as Mulkaji (Chief Kaji). Historian Rishikesh Shah asserts that Sarbajit was appointed only a Kaji and was the head of the Nepalese government for a short period in 1778.)	Rana Bahadur Shah (1775–1806)
(1)		Vamsharaj Pande (1739–1785); 2nd time	c. 1782	c. 1785	Dewan/Mantri–Nayak (Note: Daniel Wright mentions him as the Mantri-Nayak (Prime Minister) under the King Rana Bahadur Shah (1777–1799).)	Rana Bahadur Shah (1775–1806)
4		Abhiman Singh Basnyat (1744–1800)	c. 1785	c. 1794	Mulkaji (Note: Abhiman Singh Basnyat was replaced by Kirtiman Singh Basnyat as Mulkaji after the dismissal of government on maturity of King Rana Bahadur Shah in 1794 AD.)	Rana Bahadur Shah (1775–1806)
—		Bahadur Shah (1757–1797)	c. 1785	c. 1794	Mul–Chautariya (Regent) (Note: On Shrawan 1842 B.S. (i.e. July 1785), after the death of Regent Queen Rajendra Laxmi, Bahadur Shah assumed the regency and administration on the call of Bharadars. Historian Baburam Acharya referred the reign of Bahadur Shah as "Primeministership" or "Premiership". Prince Bahadur Shah of Nepal was Chief Chautariya (Mul-Chautariya) up to Baisakh 1851 B.S. (i.e. April 1794). The Chief Chautariya carried the functions of a Prime Minister.)	Rana Bahadur Shah (1775–1806)
5		Kirtiman Singh Basnyat (1760–1801)	c. 1794	c. 1801	Mulkaji (Note: Though the position of Mulkaji (Chief Kaji) was bestowed on Kirtiman Singh in 1794, Damodar Pande was the most influential Kaji. and Damodar lead the military forces and the second government to prevent the re-establishment of royal authority of self-renounced King Rana Bahadur Shah in 1799.)	Rana Bahadur Shah (1775–1806)
5		Kirtiman Singh Basnyat (1760–1801)	c. 1794	c. 1801	Mulkaji	Girvan Yuddha Bikram Shah (1799–1816)
6		Bakhtawar Singh Basnyat (1759–1840)	c. 1801	c. 1803	Mulkaji (Note: Bakhtawar Singh Basnyat, brother of assassinated Kirtiman Singh, was then given the post of Mulkaji.)	Girvan Yuddha Bikram Shah (1799–1816)

=== Mulkajis and Mukhtiyars during the Shah expansion era (1803–1846) ===
No.	Portrait	Name (Birth–Death)	Term of office		King (Reign)
No.	Portrait	Name (Birth–Death)	Took office	Left office	King (Reign)
1		Damodar Pande (1752–1804)	February 1803	March 1804	Girvan Yuddha Bikram Shah (1799–1816)
—		Rana Bahadur Shah (1775–1806)	1804 (Note: The position of Mukhtiyar was formed and ruled by renounced King Rana Bahadur Shah on the year 1804 A.D.)	25 April 1806	Girvan Yuddha Bikram Shah (1799–1816)
2		Bhimsen Thapa (1775–1839)	1806	July 1837	Girvan Yuddha Bikram Shah (1799–1816)
2		Bhimsen Thapa (1775–1839)	1806	July 1837	Rajendra Bikram Shah (1816–1847)
3		Rana Jang Pande (1789–1843); 1st time	1837	1837	Rajendra Bikram Shah (1816–1847)
4		Ranga Nath Poudyal (1773–1846); 1st time	October 1837	August 1838	Rajendra Bikram Shah (1816–1847)
5		Pushkar Shah (1784–1846)	October 1838	1839	Rajendra Bikram Shah (1816–1847)
(3)		Rana Jang Pande (1789–1843); 2nd time	April 1839	1840	Rajendra Bikram Shah (1816–1847)
(4)		Ranga Nath Poudyal (1773–1846); 2nd time	1840	1840	Rajendra Bikram Shah (1816–1847)
6		Fateh Jung Shah (1805–1846); 1st time	November 1840	January 1843	Rajendra Bikram Shah (1816–1847)
7		Mathabar Singh Thapa (1798–1845)	November 1843	17 May 1845	Rajendra Bikram Shah (1816–1847)
(6)		Fateh Jung Shah (1805–1846); 2nd time	September 1845	14 September 1846 (Assassinated)	Rajendra Bikram Shah (1816–1847)

=== Prime ministers during the Rana era (1846–1951) ===
No.	Portrait	Name (Birth–Death)	Term of office			King (Reign)
No.	Portrait	Name (Birth–Death)	Took office	Left office	Days	King (Reign)
8		Jung Bahadur Rana (1816–1877); 1st time	15 September 1846	1 August 1856	9 years, 321 days	Surendra Bikram Shah (1847–1881)
9		Bam Bahadur Kunwar (1818–1857)	1 August 1856	25 May 1857	297 days	Surendra Bikram Shah (1847–1881)
—		Krishna Bahadur Kunwar Rana (1823–1863); Acting Prime Minister	25 May 1857	28 June 1857	34 days	Surendra Bikram Shah (1847–1881)
(8)		Jung Bahadur Rana (1816–1877); 2nd time	28 June 1857	25 February 1877	19 years, 242 days	Surendra Bikram Shah (1847–1881)
10		Ranodip Singh Kunwar (1825–1885)	27 February 1877	22 November 1885 (Assassinated)	8 years, 270 days	Surendra Bikram Shah (1847–1881)
10		Ranodip Singh Kunwar (1825–1885)	27 February 1877	22 November 1885 (Assassinated)	8 years, 270 days	Prithvi Bir Bikram Shah (1881–1911)
11		Bir Shumsher Jung Bahadur Rana (1852–1901)	22 November 1885	5 March 1901	15 years, 103 days	Prithvi Bir Bikram Shah (1881–1911)
12		Dev Shumsher Jung Bahadur Rana (1862–1914)	5 March 1901	27 June 1901	114 days	Prithvi Bir Bikram Shah (1881–1911)
13		Chandra Shumsher Jung Bahadur Rana (1863–1929)	27 June 1901	26 November 1929	28 years, 152 days	Prithvi Bir Bikram Shah (1881–1911)
13		Chandra Shumsher Jung Bahadur Rana (1863–1929)	27 June 1901	26 November 1929	28 years, 152 days	Tribhuvan Bir Bikram Shah (1911–1955)
14		Bhim Shumsher Jung Bahadur Rana (1865–1932)	26 November 1929	1 September 1932	2 years, 280 days	Tribhuvan Bir Bikram Shah (1911–1955)
15		Juddha Shumsher Jung Bahadur Rana (1875–1952)	1 September 1932	29 November 1945	13 years, 89 days	Tribhuvan Bir Bikram Shah (1911–1955)
16		Padma Shumsher Jung Bahadur Rana (1882–1961)	29 November 1945	30 April 1948	2 years, 153 days	Tribhuvan Bir Bikram Shah (1911–1955)
17		Mohan Shumsher Jung Bahadur Rana (1885–1967)	30 April 1948	12 November 1951	3 years, 196 days	Tribhuvan Bir Bikram Shah (1911–1955)

=== Prime ministers during the Transition era (1951–1960) ===
No.	Portrait	Name (Birth–Death)	Term of office			Election(s)	Political party	Cabinet	King (Reign)
No.	Portrait	Name (Birth–Death)	Took office	Left office	Days	Election(s)	Political party	Cabinet	King (Reign)
18		Matrika Prasad Koirala (1912–1997); 1st time	16 November 1951	14 August 1952	272 days	—	Nepali Congress	M. P. Koirala I	Tribhuvan Bir Bikram Shah (1911–1955)
—		Direct rule by King; Tribhuvan Bir Bikram Shah (1906–1955)	14 August 1952	15 June 1953	305 days	—			Tribhuvan Bir Bikram Shah (1911–1955)
(18)		Matrika Prasad Koirala (1912–1997); 2nd time	15 June 1953	14 April 1955	1 year, 303 days	—	Rastriya Praja Party	M. P. Koirala II	Tribhuvan Bir Bikram Shah (1911–1955)
(18)		Matrika Prasad Koirala (1912–1997); 2nd time	15 June 1953	14 April 1955	1 year, 303 days	—	Rastriya Praja Party	M. P. Koirala II	Mahendra Bir Bikram Shah (1955–1972)
—		Direct rule by King; Mahendra Bir Bikram Shah (1920–1972)	14 April 1955	27 January 1956	288 days	—			Mahendra Bir Bikram Shah (1955–1972)
19		Tanka Prasad Acharya (1912–1992)	27 January 1956	26 July 1957	1 year, 180 days	—	Nepal Praja Parishad	Acharya	Mahendra Bir Bikram Shah (1955–1972)
20		Kunwar Indrajit Singh (1906–1982)	26 July 1957	15 November 1957	112 days	—	United Democratic Party	Singh	Mahendra Bir Bikram Shah (1955–1972)
—		Direct rule by King; Mahendra Bir Bikram Shah (1920–1972)	15 November 1957	15 May 1958	181 days	—			Mahendra Bir Bikram Shah (1955–1972)
21		Subarna Shamsher Rana (1910–1977)	15 May 1958	27 May 1959	1 year, 12 days	—	Nepali Congress	Rana	Mahendra Bir Bikram Shah (1955–1972)
22		Bishweshwar Prasad Koirala (1914–1982); MP for Morang–Biratnagar West	27 May 1959	15 December 1960 (Deposed)	1 year, 202 days	1959	Nepali Congress	B. P. Koirala	Mahendra Bir Bikram Shah (1955–1972)

=== Prime ministers during the partyless Panchayat era (1960–1990) ===
No.	Portrait	Name (Birth–Death)	Term of office			King (Reign)
No.	Portrait	Name (Birth–Death)	Took office	Left office	Days	King (Reign)
—		Direct rule by King; Mahendra Bir Bikram Shah (1920–1972)	15 December 1960	2 April 1963	2 years, 108 days	Mahendra Bir Bikram Shah (1955–1972)
23		Tulsi Giri (Note: As Chairman of the Council of Ministers) (1926–2018); 1st time	2 April 1963	23 December 1963	265 days	Mahendra Bir Bikram Shah (1955–1972)
24		Surya Bahadur Thapa (1928–2015); 1st time	23 December 1963	26 February 1964	65 days	Mahendra Bir Bikram Shah (1955–1972)
(23)		Tulsi Giri (1926–2018); 2nd time	26 February 1964	26 January 1965	335 days	Mahendra Bir Bikram Shah (1955–1972)
(24)		Surya Bahadur Thapa (Note: As Chairman of the Council of Ministers from January 26, 1965 to May 29, 1967, when he then assumed the title of Prime Minister.) (1928–2015); 2nd time	26 January 1965	7 April 1969	4 years, 71 days	Mahendra Bir Bikram Shah (1955–1972)
25		Kirti Nidhi Bista (1927–2017); 1st time	7 April 1969	13 April 1970	1 year, 6 days	Mahendra Bir Bikram Shah (1955–1972)
–		Gehendra Bahadur Rajbhandari (1923–1994); Acting Prime Minister	13 April 1970	14 April 1971	1 year, 1 day	Mahendra Bir Bikram Shah (1955–1972)
(25)		Kirti Nidhi Bista (1927–2017); 2nd time	14 April 1971	16 July 1973	2 years, 63 days	Mahendra Bir Bikram Shah (1955–1972)
(25)		Kirti Nidhi Bista (1927–2017); 2nd time	14 April 1971	16 July 1973	2 years, 63 days	Birendra Bir Bikram Shah (1972–2001)
26		Nagendra Prasad Rijal (1927–1994); 1st time	16 July 1973	1 December 1975	2 years, 168 days	Birendra Bir Bikram Shah (1972–2001)
(23)		Tulsi Giri (1926–2018); 3rd time	1 December 1975	12 September 1977	1 year, 285 days	Birendra Bir Bikram Shah (1972–2001)
(25)		Kirti Nidhi Bista (1927–2017); 3rd time	12 September 1977	30 May 1979	1 year, 260 days	Birendra Bir Bikram Shah (1972–2001)
(24)		Surya Bahadur Thapa (1928–2015); 3rd time	30 May 1979	12 July 1983	4 years, 43 days	Birendra Bir Bikram Shah (1972–2001)
27		Lokendra Bahadur Chand (born 1940); 1st time	12 July 1983	21 March 1986	2 years, 252 days	Birendra Bir Bikram Shah (1972–2001)
(26)		Nagendra Prasad Rijal (1927–1994); 2nd time	21 March 1986	15 June 1986	86 days	Birendra Bir Bikram Shah (1972–2001)
28		Marich Man Singh Shrestha (1942–2013)	15 June 1986	6 April 1990	3 years, 295 days	Birendra Bir Bikram Shah (1972–2001)
(27)		Lokendra Bahadur Chand (born 1940); 2nd time	6 April 1990	19 April 1990	13 days	Birendra Bir Bikram Shah (1972–2001)

=== Prime ministers during the Constitutional monarchy (1990–2008) ===
No.	Portrait	Name (Birth–Death)	Term of office			Election(s)	Political party	Cabinet	King (Reign)
No.	Portrait	Name (Birth–Death)	Took office	Left office	Days	Election(s)	Political party	Cabinet	King (Reign)
29		Krishna Prasad Bhattarai (1924–2011); 1st time	19 April 1990	26 May 1991	1 year, 37 days	—	Nepali Congress	K. P. Bhattarai (Interim)	Birendra Bir Bikram Shah (1972–2001)
30		Girija Prasad Koirala (1924–2010); MP for Morang 1; 1st time	26 May 1991	30 November 1994	3 years, 188 days	1991	Nepali Congress	G. P. Koirala I	Birendra Bir Bikram Shah (1972–2001)
31		Man Mohan Adhikari (1920–1999); MP for Kathmandu 3	30 November 1994	12 September 1995	286 days	1994	Communist Party of Nepal (Unified Marxist–Leninist)	Adhikari	Birendra Bir Bikram Shah (1972–2001)
32		Sher Bahadur Deuba (born 1946); MP for Dadeldhura 1; 1st time	12 September 1995	12 March 1997	1 year, 181 days	1994	Nepali Congress	Deuba I	Birendra Bir Bikram Shah (1972–2001)
(27)		Lokendra Bahadur Chand (born 1940); MP for Baitadi 2; 3rd time	12 March 1997	7 October 1997	209 days	1994	Rastriya Prajatantra Party	Chand III	Birendra Bir Bikram Shah (1972–2001)
(24)		Surya Bahadur Thapa (1928–2015); MP for Dhankuta 2; 4th time	7 October 1997	15 April 1998	190 days	1994	Rastriya Prajatantra Party	Thapa IV	Birendra Bir Bikram Shah (1972–2001)
(30)		Girija Prasad Koirala (1924–2010); MP for Morang 1; 2nd time	15 April 1998	23 December 1998	252 days	1994	Nepali Congress	G. P. Koirala II	Birendra Bir Bikram Shah (1972–2001)
(30)		3rd time	23 December 1998	31 May 1999	159 days	1994	Nepali Congress	G. P. Koirala III	Birendra Bir Bikram Shah (1972–2001)
(29)		Krishna Prasad Bhattarai (1924–2011); MP for Parsa 1; 2nd time	31 May 1999	22 March 2000	296 days	1999	Nepali Congress	K. P. Bhattarai	Birendra Bir Bikram Shah (1972–2001)
(30)		Girija Prasad Koirala (1924–2010); MP for Sunsari 5; 4th time	22 March 2000	26 July 2001	1 year, 126 days	1999	Nepali Congress	G. P. Koirala IV	Birendra Bir Bikram Shah (1972–2001)
(30)		Girija Prasad Koirala (1924–2010); MP for Sunsari 5; 4th time	22 March 2000	26 July 2001	1 year, 126 days	1999	Nepali Congress	G. P. Koirala IV	Gyanendra Bir Bikram Shah (2001–2008)
(32)		Sher Bahadur Deuba (born 1946); MP for Dadeldhura 1; 2nd time	26 July 2001	4 October 2002	1 year, 70 days	1999	Nepali Congress	Deuba II	Gyanendra Bir Bikram Shah (2001–2008)
—		Direct rule by King; Gyanendra Bir Bikram Shah (born 1947)	4 October 2002	11 October 2002	7 days	—			Gyanendra Bir Bikram Shah (2001–2008)
(27)		Lokendra Bahadur Chand (born 1940); 4th time	11 October 2002	5 June 2003	237 days	—	Rastriya Prajatantra Party	Chand IV	Gyanendra Bir Bikram Shah (2001–2008)
(24)		Surya Bahadur Thapa (1928–2015); 5th time	5 June 2003	3 June 2004	364 days	—	Rastriya Prajatantra Party	Thapa V	Gyanendra Bir Bikram Shah (2001–2008)
(32)		Sher Bahadur Deuba (born 1946); 3rd time	3 June 2004	1 February 2005 (Deposed)	243 days	—	Nepali Congress (Democratic)	Deuba III	Gyanendra Bir Bikram Shah (2001–2008)
—		Direct rule by King; Gyanendra Bir Bikram Shah (born 1947)	1 February 2005	25 April 2006	1 year, 83 days	—			Gyanendra Bir Bikram Shah (2001–2008)
(30)		Girija Prasad Koirala (1924–2010); 5th time	25 April 2006	1 April 2007	341 days	—	Nepali Congress	G. P. Koirala V	Gyanendra Bir Bikram Shah (2001–2008)
(30)		Interim term	1 April 2007	18 August 2008	1 year, 139 days	—	Nepali Congress	G. P. Koirala (Interim)	Gyanendra Bir Bikram Shah (2001–2008)
(30)		Interim term	1 April 2007	18 August 2008	1 year, 139 days	—	Nepali Congress	G. P. Koirala (Interim)	Himself (2007–2008) (Acting Head of State)

== Prime ministers of the Federal Democratic Republic of Nepal (2008–present) ==
=== Under the Constituent Assembly framework ===
No.	Portrait	Name (Birth–Death)	Term of office			Election(s)	Political party	Cabinet	President (Term)
No.	Portrait	Name (Birth–Death)	Took office	Left office	Days	Election(s)	Political party	Cabinet	President (Term)
33		Pushpa Kamal Dahal (born 1954); MCA for Kathmandu 10; 1st time	18 August 2008	25 May 2009	280 days	2008 (Constituent Assembly)	Unified Communist Party of Nepal (Maoist)	Dahal I	Ram Baran Yadav (2008–2015)
34		Madhav Kumar Nepal (born 1953); Nominated MCA	25 May 2009	6 February 2011	1 year, 257 days	2008 (Constituent Assembly)	Communist Party of Nepal (Unified Marxist–Leninist)	Nepal	Ram Baran Yadav (2008–2015)
35		Jhala Nath Khanal (born 1950); MCA for Ilam 1	6 February 2011	29 August 2011	204 days	2008 (Constituent Assembly)	Communist Party of Nepal (Unified Marxist–Leninist)	Khanal	Ram Baran Yadav (2008–2015)
36		Baburam Bhattarai (born 1954); MCA for Gorkha 2	29 August 2011	14 March 2013	1 year, 197 days	2008 (Constituent Assembly)	Unified Communist Party of Nepal (Maoist)	B. Bhattarai	Ram Baran Yadav (2008–2015)
—		Khil Raj Regmi (born 1949); Chair of the Cabinet of Ministers	14 March 2013	11 February 2014	334 days	—	Independent	Regmi (Interim)	Ram Baran Yadav (2008–2015)
37		Sushil Koirala (1939–2016); MCA for Banke 3	11 February 2014	12 October 2015	1 year, 243 days	2013 (Constituent Assembly)	Nepali Congress	S. Koirala	Ram Baran Yadav (2008–2015)
38		K. P. Sharma Oli (born 1952); MCA for Jhapa 7; 1st time	12 October 2015	4 August 2016	297 days	2013 (Constituent Assembly)	Communist Party of Nepal (Unified Marxist–Leninist)	Oli I	Ram Baran Yadav (2008–2015)
38		K. P. Sharma Oli (born 1952); MCA for Jhapa 7; 1st time	12 October 2015	4 August 2016	297 days	2013 (Constituent Assembly)	Communist Party of Nepal (Unified Marxist–Leninist)	Oli I	Bidya Devi Bhandari (2015–2023)
(33)		Pushpa Kamal Dahal (born 1954); MCA for Siraha 5; 2nd time	4 August 2016	7 June 2017	307 days	2013 (Constituent Assembly)	Communist Party of Nepal (Maoist Centre)	Dahal II	Bidya Devi Bhandari (2015–2023)
(32)		Sher Bahadur Deuba (born 1946); MCA for Dadeldhura 1; 4th time	7 June 2017	15 February 2018	253 days	2013 (Constituent Assembly)	Nepali Congress	Deuba IV	Bidya Devi Bhandari (2015–2023)

=== Under the 2015 Constitution framework ===
Key

- ^{MAJ} Took oath as Majority PM (Article 76, clause 1)
- ^{COA} Took oath as Coalition leader PM (Article 76, clause 2)
- ^{MIN} Took oath as Minority PM (Article 76, clause 3)
- ^{ANY} Took oath as PM who could muster enough votes for vote of confidence (Article 75, clause 5)
- ^{RES} Resigned and was discharged soon
- ^{NCM} lost no-confidence motion and was discharged soon
- ^{DIS} Discharged, as the Head of State appoints the next Prime Minister

No.	Portrait	Name (Birth–Death)	Term of office			Election(s)	Political party	Cabinet	President (Term)
No.	Portrait	Name (Birth–Death)	Took office	Left office	Days	Election(s)	Political party	Cabinet	President (Term)
(38)		K. P. Sharma Oli (born 1952); MP for Jhapa 5; 2nd time	15 February 2018^{[COA]}	14 May 2021^{[NCM]}	3 years, 88 days	2017	Communist Party of Nepal (Unified Marxist–Leninist)	Oli II	Bidya Devi Bhandari (2015–2023)
(38)		3rd time	14 May 2021^{[MIN]}	13 July 2021^{[DIS]}	60 days	2017	Communist Party of Nepal (Unified Marxist–Leninist)	Oli III	Bidya Devi Bhandari (2015–2023)
(32)		Sher Bahadur Deuba (born 1946); MP for Dadeldhura 1; 5th time	13 July 2021^{[ANY]}	26 December 2022^{[DIS]}	1 year, 166 days	2017	Nepali Congress	Deuba V	Bidya Devi Bhandari (2015–2023)
(33)		Pushpa Kamal Dahal (born 1954); MP for Gorkha 2; 3rd time	26 December 2022^{[COA]}	15 July 2024^{[NCM]}	1 year, 202 days	2022	Communist Party of Nepal (Maoist Centre)	Dahal III	Bidya Devi Bhandari (2015–2023)
(33)		Pushpa Kamal Dahal (born 1954); MP for Gorkha 2; 3rd time	26 December 2022^{[COA]}	15 July 2024^{[NCM]}	1 year, 202 days	2022	Communist Party of Nepal (Maoist Centre)	Dahal III	Ram Chandra Paudel (2023–present)
(38)		K. P. Sharma Oli (born 1952); MP for Jhapa 5; 4th time	15 July 2024^{[COA]}	12 September 2025 (Note: resigned on 9 September 2025)^{[RES]}	1 year, 59 days	2022	Communist Party of Nepal (Unified Marxist–Leninist)	Oli IV	Ram Chandra Paudel (2023–present)
—		Sushila Karki (born 1952); Interim	12 September 2025	27 March 2026^{[DIS]}	196 days	—	Independent	Karki (Interim)	Ram Chandra Paudel (2023–present)
39		Balendra Shah (born 1990); MP for Jhapa 5	27 March 2026^{[MAJ]}	Incumbent	227 days	2026	Rastriya Swatantra Party	Shah	Ram Chandra Paudel (2023–present)

== See also ==
- King of Nepal
- President of Nepal
- Prime Minister of Nepal
- Government of Nepal
