= Interim government of Nepal =

Interim government of Nepal or interim cabinet of Nepal may refer to:

- Subarna Shamsher Rana cabinet, between 1958–59 formed to conduct the 1959 Nepalese general election
- Krishna Prasad Bhattarai interim cabinet, between 1990–91 following the 1990 Nepalese revolution
- Girija Prasad Koirala interim cabinet, in 2007 to conduct the 2008 Nepalese Constituent Assembly election
- Regmi interim cabinet, between 2013–2014 to conduct the 2013 Nepalese Constituent Assembly election
- Karki interim cabinet,between 2025-2026 formed in 2025 following the 2025 Nepalese Gen Z protests
