= Leader of the Opposition (Nepal) =

Post in the House of Representatives

Leader of Opposition
- प्रमुख प्रतिपक्षी दलको नेता
- Emblem of Nepal

- Flag of Nepal
- Incumbent; Bhishma Raj Angdembe since 27 April 2026
- Style: Leader of the Opposition (informal); The Honourable (formal)
- Member of: House of Representatives, Constitutional Council
- Reports to: House of Representatives
- Nominator: MPs of Largest oppostition party in the House
- Term length: While leader of the largest political party in the House of Representatives that is not in government (No term limits specified)
- First holder: Bharat Shumsher JBR
- Salary: NPR 72,730 (excl. allowances) per month

The Leader of the Opposition (Nepali: प्रमुख प्रतिपक्षी दलको नेता) is an elected member of the House of Representatives, who leads the official opposition in the lower house of the Federal Parliament of Nepal. The leader of the opposition is the parliamentary party leader of the political party with the largest number of seats in the House but not in government.

The current leader of the opposition is Bhishma Raj Angdembe, who was elected the parliamentary leader of the Nepali Congress, the largest opposition party in the 7th House of Representatives, on 27 April 2026.

According to Article 284 of the Constituiton, Leader of the Opposition is also the member of Constitutional Council, which is chaired by the Prime Minister of Nepal.

== List ==
Leaders of the Opposition
No.	Portrait	Name	Party	Assumed office	Left office	Prime Minister	Term
1		Bharat Shumsher JBR	NRGP	27 May 1959	15 December 1960	B. P. Koirala	1st House of Representatives
2		Man Mohan Adhikari	CPN (UML)	26 May 1991	30 November 1994	Girija Prasad Koirala	2nd House of Representatives
3		Sher Bahadur Deuba	Nepali Congress	30 November 1994	12 September 1995	Man Mohan Adhikari	3rd House of Representatives
(2)		Man Mohan Adhikari	CPN (UML)	12 September 1995	12 March 1997	Sher Bahadur Deuba	3rd House of Representatives
4		Girija Prasad Koirala	Nepali Congress	12 March 1997	7 October 1997	Lokendra Bahadur Chand	3rd House of Representatives
(2)		Man Mohan Adhikari	CPN (UML)	7 October 1997	15 April 1998	Surya Bahadur Thapa	3rd House of Representatives
(2)		Man Mohan Adhikari	CPN (UML)	15 April 1998	23 December 1998	Girija Prasad Koirala	3rd House of Representatives
5		Bam Dev Gautam	CPN (ML)	23 December 1998	31 May 1999	Girija Prasad Koirala	3rd House of Representatives
6		Madhav Kumar Nepal	CPN (UML)	31 May 1999	22 May 2002	Krishna Prasad Bhattarai	4th House of Representatives
6		Madhav Kumar Nepal	CPN (UML)	31 May 1999	22 May 2002	Girija Prasad Koirala	4th House of Representatives
6		Madhav Kumar Nepal	CPN (UML)	31 May 1999	22 May 2002	Sher Bahadur Deuba	4th House of Representatives
(4)		Girija Prasad Koirala	Nepali Congress	18 August 2008	25 May 2009	Pushpa Kamal Dahal	1st Constituent Assembly
7		Pushpa Kamal Dahal	UCPN (Maoist)	25 May 2009	6 February 2011	Madhav Kumar Nepal	1st Constituent Assembly
8		Ram Chandra Paudel	Nepali Congress	6 February 2011	14 March 2013	Jhala Nath Khanal	1st Constituent Assembly
8		Ram Chandra Paudel	Nepali Congress	6 February 2011	14 March 2013	Baburam Bhattarai	1st Constituent Assembly
(7)		Pushpa Kamal Dahal	UCPN (Maoist)	11 February 2014	11 October 2015	Sushil Koirala	2nd Constituent Assembly
9		Sushil Koirala	Nepali Congress	11 October 2015	9 February 2016	K. P. Sharma Oli	Legislature Parliament
(3)		Sher Bahadur Deuba	Nepali Congress	7 March 2016	4 August 2016	K. P. Sharma Oli	Legislature Parliament
10		K. P. Sharma Oli	CPN (UML)	4 August 2016	15 February 2018	Pushpa Kamal Dahal	Legislature Parliament
10		K. P. Sharma Oli	CPN (UML)	4 August 2016	15 February 2018	Sher Bahadur Deuba	Legislature Parliament
(3)		Sher Bahadur Deuba	Nepali Congress	15 February 2018	13 July 2021	K. P. Sharma Oli	5th House of Representatives
(10)		K. P. Sharma Oli	CPN (UML)	13 July 2021	26 December 2022	Sher Bahadur Deuba	5th House of Representatives
(3)		Sher Bahadur Deuba	Nepali Congress	26 December 2022	27 February 2023	Pushpa Kamal Dahal	6th House of Representatives
(10)		K. P. Sharma Oli	CPN (UML)	27 February 2023	4 March 2024	Pushpa Kamal Dahal	6th House of Representatives
(3)		Sher Bahadur Deuba	Nepali Congress	4 March 2024	15 July 2024	Pushpa Kamal Dahal	6th House of Representatives
(7)		Pushpa Kamal Dahal	CPN (Maoist Centre)	15 July 2024	12 September 2025	K. P. Sharma Oli	6th House of Representatives
11		Bhishma Raj Angdembe	Nepali Congress	27 April 2026	Incumbent	Balen Shah	7th House of Representatives
