= 1st House of Representatives (Nepal) =

Legislative session of Nepal

1st Panchayat	→
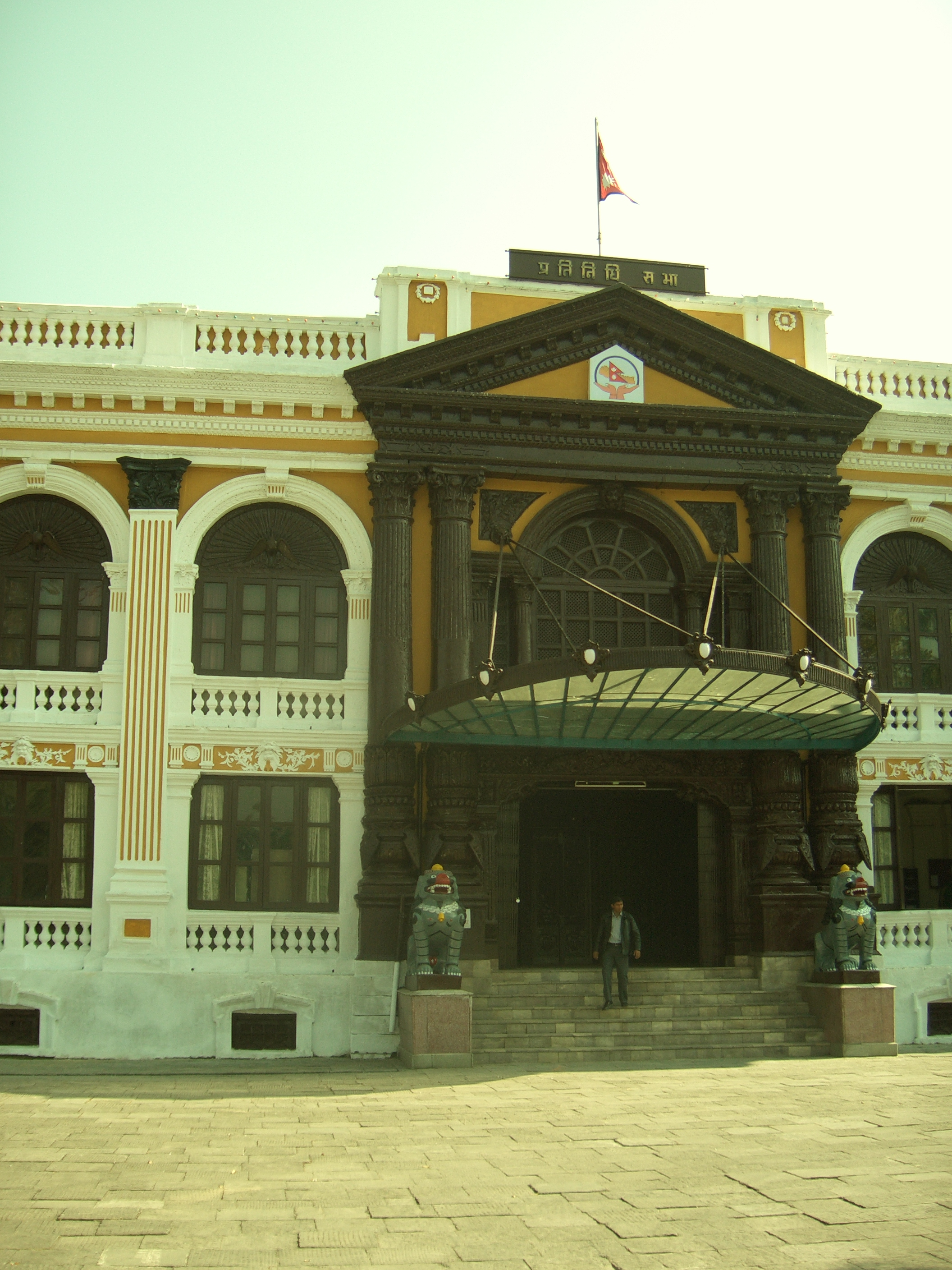
- Gallery Baithak

Overview
- Legislative body: Parliament of the Kingdom of Nepal
- Jurisdiction: Kingdom of Nepal
- Meeting place: Gallery Baithak
- Term: 30 June 1959 – 15 December 1960
- Election: 1959 general election
- Government: B.P. Koirala cabinet

House of Representatives
- Members: 109
- Speaker: Krishna Prasad Bhattarai (NC)
- Deputy Speaker: Mahendra Narayan Nidhi (NC)
- Prime Minister: B. P. Koirala (NC)

Sessions
- 1st: 30 June – 7 October 1959
- 2nd: 31 March – 15 September 1960

The 1st House of Representatives was elected at the 1959 Nepalese general election.

The list of elected members is arranged by constituency. Krishna Prasad Bhattarai serves as the speaker and B. P. Koirala served as Prime Minister.

== House composition ==
1st House of Representatives

Parliament at dissolution

Parliament after elections

Party	Members	
Party	After election	At dissolution
Nepali Congress	74	73
Nepal Rashtrabadi Gorkha Parishad	19	19
Samyukta Prajatantra Party	5	5
Communist Party of Nepal	4	4
Nepal Praja Parishad (Acharya)	2	2
Nepal Praja Parishad (Mishra)	1	1
Independents	4	4
Vacant	—	1
Total	109	109

== Members of the House ==
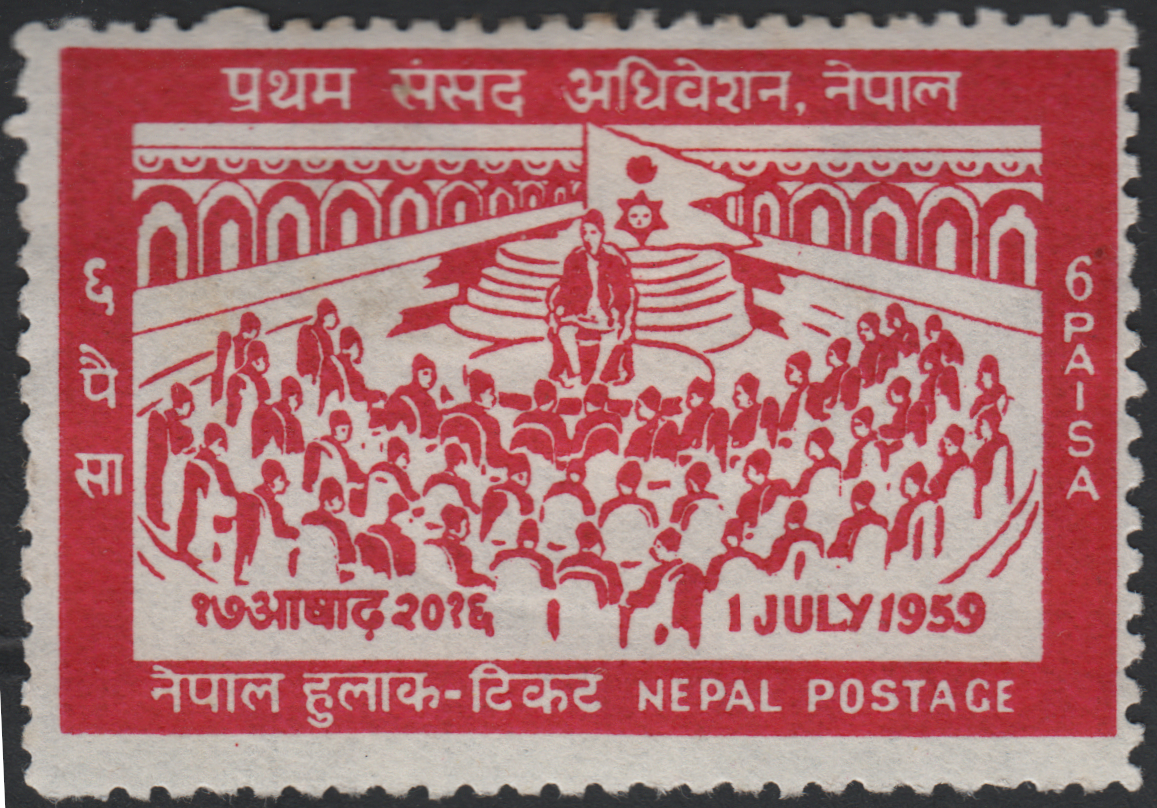
Commemorative stamp marking the start of the first session of the 1st House of Representatives, the first elected legislature of Nepal

Constituency		Elected candidate	Party
#	Name	Elected candidate	Party
1	Kantipur	Ganesh Man Singh	Nepali Congress
2	Kathmandu Valley West	Nar Bahadur Thapa Chettri	Nepal Rashtrabadi Gorkha Parishad
3	Lalitpur Valley	Tulsi Lal Amatya	Communist Party of Nepal
4	Bhaktapur Valley	Jagannath Acharya	Nepali Congress
5	Kathmandu Valley North-East	Lochan Shamsher Thapa	Samyukta Prajatantra Party
6	Chautara North-West	Guna Nidhi	Nepal Rashtrabadi Gorkha Parishad
7	Chautara North-East	Chandra Lal Shrestha	Nepali Congress
8	Chautara Mid-West	Surendra Prasad Upadhyaya	Nepal Rashtrabadi Gorkha Parishad
9	Chautara South	Tirtha Man Lama	Nepal Rashtrabadi Gorkha Parishad
10	Chautara Mid-East	Harsha Jeet Lama	Nepal Rashtrabadi Gorkha Parishad
11	Dolakha North	Griha Bahadur Basnet	Nepali Congress
12	Dolakha Central	Lt Gen Mrigendra Shamsher JBR	Nepal Rashtrabadi Gorkha Parishad
13	Rammechap North	Bishnu Prasad Upreti	Nepal Rashtrabadi Gorkha Parishad
14	Rammechap South	Beni Bahadur Karki	Nepal Rashtrabadi Gorkha Parishad
15	Sindhuli	Jeet Bahadur Karki	Nepal Praja Parishad (Acharya)
16	Aiselukharka	Maniram Shastri	Nepali Congress
17	Okhaldhunga	Pesal Kumar Pokharel	Nepali Congress
18	Manebhanjyang	Bal Bahadur Rai	Nepali Congress
19	Bhopjur Central	Khadga Bahadur Karki	Nepali Congress
20	Bhojpur South	Bhudev Rai	Nepali Congress
21	Bhojpur North-East	Devan Singh Rai	Nepali Congress
22	Dhankuta South-West	Lila Nath Dahal	Nepali Congress
23	Dhankuta North-West	Padma Nath Regmi	Nepali Congress
24	Dhankuta North-East	Kulman Ijam Limbu	Nepali Congress
25	Dhankuta East-Central	Premraj Angdembe	Nepali Congress
26	Dhankuta Central	Tejman Tumbahamphe	Nepali Congress
27	Dhankuta South	Dagal Singh Sen Limbu	Nepali Congress
28	Ilam West	Ganesh Prasad Rijal	Nepali Congress
29	Ilam Mid-East	Krishna Bahadur Shakhe	Nepali Congress
30	Jhapa	Fateh Bahadur Budhathoki	Nepali Congress
31	Morang Biratnagar East	Chetulal Chaudhary	Nepali Congress
32	Morang Biratnagar West	B. P. Koirala	Nepali Congress
33	Morang Biratnagar North-West	Gyan Chandra Sardar	Nepali Congress
34	Udayapur	Ambebar Singh Basnet	Nepali Congress
35	Saptari East	Dugninda Prasad Tharu	Nepal Rashtrabadi Gorkha Parishad
36	Saptari Central	Nageshwor Prasad Singh	Nepali Congress
37	Saptari West	Hari Lal Chaudhary	Independent
38	Saptari West Ghanchabar	Surya Nath Das	Nepali Congress
39	Siraha Central	Dev Nath Das	Nepali Congress
40	Siraha West	Madhav Prasad	Nepali Congress
41	Khesrah Mahottari South-East	Saroj Prasad Koirala	Nepali Congress
42	Mahottari North-East	Rudra Prasad Giri	Nepali Congress
43	Janakpur	Mahendra Narayan Nidhi	Nepali Congress
44	Mahottari Praganna East	Ram Narayan Mishra	Nepali Congress
45	Mahottari Pragnna West	Beni Madhav Singh	Nepali Congress
46	Asimau Kodraha	Ram Dular Rae Yadav	Independent
47	Sarlahi West	Nistar Rae	Nepal Praja Parishad (Mishra)
48	Rautahat South-West	Sheikh Idris	Nepal Praja Parishad (Acharya)
49	Rautahat Mid-East	Sheikh Farman	Communist Party of Nepal
50	Rautahat North Dostiya	Hardyal Mahato	Communist Party of Nepal
51	Bara Mid-South	Bhagwat Yadav	Nepali Congress
52	Bara Mid-East	Man Mohan Mishra	Nepal Rashtrabadi Gorkha Parishad
53	Bara West–Parsa East	Subarna Shamsher JBR	Nepali Congress
54	Parsa West	Muni Lal Tharu	Nepal Rashtrabadi Gorkha Parishad
55	Makawanpur	Tara Prasad Upadhyaya	Nepal Rashtrabadi Gorkha Parishad
56	Chitaun Chisapani	Bishwa Bandhu Thapa	Nepali Congress
57	Palhi East	Prithvi Raj Kandel	Nepali Congress
58	Palhi West-Majha Khanda Central	Triveni Kurmi	Samyukta Prajatantra Party
59	Majha Khanda West	Kashi Prasad Shriwastav	Samyukta Prajatantra Party
60	Khajahani East	Basudev Tiwari	Samyukta Prajatantra Party
61	Khajahani West Shivaraj	Shiva Pratap Shah	Nepali Congress
62	Dang	Parshu Narayan Chaudhary	Nepali Congress
63	Banke	Lalit Chand	Nepali Congress
64	Bardiya	Radha Krishna	Nepali Congress
65	Kailali–Kanchanpur	Lokendra Bahadur Shah	Nepali Congress
66	Dhadeldhura	Dwarika Devi Thakurani	Nepali Congress
67	Baitadi South-East	Durga Datta Joshi	Nepali Congress
68	Baitadi North-West	Krishna Lal Lekhak	Nepali Congress
69	Bajhang	Karna Bahadur Singh	Nepali Congress
70	Tharala Doti North	Navaraj Joshi	Nepali Congress
71	Doti South	Shiva Raj Panta	Nepali Congress
72	Achham–Bajura	Dil Bahadur Budathapa	Nepali Congress
73	Jumla North	Bhim Prasad Shrestha	Independent
74	Jumla South	Jaya Bahadur Mahat Chettri	Independent
76	Dailkeh Central	Bhakta Bahadur Shahi	Nepali Congress
77	Dailekh East	Nir Bahadur Pachhai	Nepali Congress
78	Salyan North-West	Prakash Bikram Shah	Nepali Congress
79	Salyan Mid-West	Nev Bahadur Malla	Nepali Congress
80	Salyan South-East–Falawang State Dang North-West	Ganesh Kumar Sharma	Nepali Congress
81	Salyan South-East	Judhha Bahadur Khatri	Nepali Congress
82	Salyan North-East	Tek Bahadur Gharti Chhetri	Nepali Congress
83	Pyuthan North-West	Khadananda Upadhyaya	Nepali Congress
84	Pyuthan Mid-East	Anirudra Sharma	Nepali Congress
85	Pyuthan South-East	Purushottam Sharma	Nepali Congress
86	Baglung South-West	Bharat Bam Malla	Nepali Congress
87	Baglung North	Yogendra Man Sherchan	Nepali Congress
88	Baglung South-East	Hari Datta Upadhyaya	Nepal Rashtrabadi Gorkha Parishad
89	Gulmi North-East	Giri Prasad Budathoki	Nepali Congress
90	Gulmi North-West	Nilambar Sharma	Nepali Congress
91	Gulmi South-West	Pushkar Nath Pokharel	Nepali Congress
92	Gulmi Mid-East	Kashi Nath Gautam	Nepali Congress
93	Palpa West	Achyut Raj Regmi	Nepali Congress
94	Palpa East	Kamal Raj Regmi	Communist Party of Nepal
95	Nuwakot South-East	Jaman Singh Gurung	Nepali Congress
96	Nuwakot South-West	Yem Bahadur Thakuri	Nepali Congress
97	Nuwakot Central	Dik Bahadur Gurung	Nepali Congress
98	Nuwakot North	Dhir Bahadur Gurung	Samyukta Prajatantra Party
99	Pokhara West	Min Bahadur Gurung	Nepali Congress
100	Pokhara Central	Shrikanta Adhikari	Nepali Congress
101	Pokhara North	Narendra Jung Gurung	Nepali Congress
102	Pokhara South-West	Padma Bahadur	Nepali Congress
103	Pokhara South-East	Shribhadra Sharma	Nepali Congress
104	Gorkha North	Bishwa Nath Subedi	Nepal Rashtrabadi Gorkha Parishad
105	Gorkha South	Komal Bahadur Kunwar	Nepal Rashtrabadi Gorkha Parishad
106	Dhading South	Lalit Bahadur Ghale	Nepal Rashtrabadi Gorkha Parishad
107	Dhadhing North	Bharat Shumsher JBR	Nepal Rashtrabadi Gorkha Parishad
108	Nuwakot	Dev Bir Pandey	Nepal Rashtrabadi Gorkha Parishad
109	Nuwakot South	Bhim Bahadur Karki	Nepal Rashtrabadi Gorkha Parishad
Source: Election Commission

== By-elections ==
Constituency		Incumbent MP	Party	Cause of vacation	Elected MP	Party
#	Name	Incumbent MP	Party	Cause of vacation	Elected MP	Party
52	Bara Mid-East	Subarna Shamsher JBR	Nepali Congress	Elected from Bara West–Parsa East	Man Mohan Mishra	Nepal Rastriya Gorkha Parishad
70	Thalara Doti North	Shiva Raj Panta	Nepali Congress	Elected from Doti South	Navaraj Joshi	Nepali Congress
91	Gulmi South-West	Subarna Shamsher JBR	Nepali Congress	Elected from Bara West-Parsa East	Pushkar Nath Pokharel	Nepali Congress
75	Dailekh West	Indra Singh Rawal Chettri	Nepal Rashtrabadi Gorkha Parishad	Death		
