= Bharat Shumsher Jung Bahadur Rana =

Nepalese politician

- भरत शमशेर जंगबहादुर राणा

Leader of the Opposition
- In office 27 May 1959 – 15 December 1960
- Prime Minister: B. P. Koirala
- Preceded by: Position established
- Succeeded by: Man Mohan Adhikari (1991)

Member of the House of Representatives
- In office 30 June 1959 – 15 December 1960
- Preceded by: Constituency established
- Succeeded by: Constituency abolished
- Constituency: Dhading North

President of Nepal Rashtrabadi Gorkha Parishad
- In office 1951–1961

Personal details
- Born: c. 1929/30 Singha Durbar
- Died: 10 August 2018 (aged 88–89) Kolkata
- Party: Nepali Congress
- Other political affiliations: Gorkha Parishad (until 1961)
- Children: Durga Rajyalaxmi; Jaya Rajyalaxmi; Nanda SJB Rana
- Parent: Mrigendra SJB Rana (father)
- Relatives: Rana dynasty

Bharat Shumsher Jung Bahadur Rana (Nepali: भरत शमशेर जंगबहादुर राणा) was a Nepalese politician that served as the first leader of opposition in the Pratinidhi Sabha.

== Early life ==
Bharat Shumsher was born at Singha Durbar in Kathmandu. His father Mrigendra Shamsher was the oldest son of commander-in-chief of the Royal Nepali Army, Baber Shumsher Jung Bahadur Rana. After his grandfather Chandra Shamsher died in November 1929, his family moved to Baber Mahal.

He studied at St Xavier's College in Bombay.

== Political career ==
He served as the Minister for Agriculture under prime minister Mohan Shamsher prior to the 1951 revolution. After the revolution, he organized the Khukuri Dal with members of the Rana family and Chhetris living in the outskirts of Kathmandu. The Khurkuri Dal was reorganized as the Veer Gorkha Dal with Bharat Shamsher as general secretary. In April 1951, Bharat Shamsher along with Ranadhir Subba were arrested under the Public Safety Act under the orders of home minister B. P. Koirala Members of the Gorkha Dal broke Rana and Subba out of jail and marched around Tundikhel to try to incite the army to mutiny. He was rearrested the same evening and Veer Gorkha Dal was banned by the government. He was released in November 1951.

He was elected from Dhading North at the 1959 general election. He served as the Leader of Opposition in the 1st Pratinidhi Sabha from 1959 until the royal coup in 1960. In 1960, Rana was arrested in the coup d'état led by King Mahendra, however, he was released next year, following his support for the Nepalese royal family. He escaped to India and announced a merger of his party with the Nepali Congress in September 1961. Bharat supported the wing that called for an armed struggle against the Panchayat regime.

He came back to Nepal in April 1980 after senior leadership in the party advocated a policy of reconciliation.

== Personal life ==
He also produced many Bengali movies. He also produced the Satyajit Ray's much-acclaimed movie Seemabaddha.

He died on 10 August 2018 in Kolkata.
