= Second Matrika Prasad Koirala cabinet =

Cabinet of Nepal, 1953–1955

- Cabinet of Nepal
- June 1953–April 1955
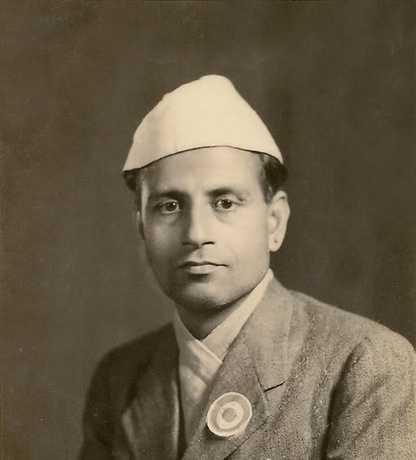
- M.P. Koirala
- Date formed: 15 June 1953
- Date dissolved: 14 April 1955

People and organisations
- Monarch: King Tribhuvan
- Prime Minister: Matrika Prasad Koirala
- Total no. of members: 9 appointments
- Member party: Rastriya Praja Party

History
- Predecessor: M.P. Koirala cabinet, 1951
- Successor: Tanka Acharya cabinet, 1956

Matrika Prasad Koirala formed his second government in 1953 after his appointment by King Tribhuvan. The cabinet was expanded in February 1954 to include Nepal National Congress, Nepal Praja Parishad and Nepali Jan Congress.

Matrika Prasad Koirala resigned on 14 April 1955 and his government was followed by the direct rule of King Mahendra and his advisors.

== Cabinet ==
=== June 1953 – February 1954 ===
Portfolio	Minister	Affiliation	Took office	Left office
Prime Minister Minister of Foreign Affairs Minister for General Administration Minister of Finance	Hon. Matrika Prasada Koirala	Rastriya Praja Party	15 June 1953	14 April 1955
Minister of Home Affairs Minister for Planning Minister for Industry, Commerce and Civil Supplies Minister for Food Department	Mahabir SJB Rana	Rana regime	15 June 1953	18 February 1954
Minister of Defence Minister for Land Revenue and Forest Department	Narad Muni Thulung	Rastriya Praja Party	15 June 1953	14 April 1955
Minister of Finance Minister for Local Autonomous Administration Minister for Education Minister for Public Works Minister for Communications	Tripurbar Singh Pradhan	Rastriya Praja Party	15 June 1953	18 February 1954
Minister for Law and Parliamentary Affairs	Suryanath Das Yadav	Rastriya Praja Party	15 June 1953	18 February 1954

=== February 1954 – April 1955 ===
Portfolio	Minister	Affiliation	Took office	Left office
Prime Minister Minister for General Administration Minister of Finance	Hon. Matrika Prasada Koirala	Rastriya Praja Party	15 June 1953	14 April 1955
Minister for Planning Minister for Agriculture, Industry and Commerce Minister for Food Department	Mahabir SJB Rana	Rana regime	18 February 1954	14 April 1955
Minister for Land Revenue and Forest Department	Narad Muni Thulung	Rastriya Praja Party	15 June 1953	14 April 1955
Minister of Defence	Kaiser SJB Rana	Rana regime	18 February 1954	14 April 1955
Minister of Foreign Affairs Minister for Education Minister for Local Autonomous Administration Minister of Health	Dilli Raman Regmi	Nepal National Congress	18 February 1954	14 April 1955
Minister of Home Affairs	Tanka Prasad Acharya	Nepal Praja Parishad	18 February 1954	14 April 1955
Minister for Public Works Minister for Communications Minister for Law and Parliamentary Affairs	Bhadrakali Mishra	Nepali Jan Congress	18 February 1954	14 April 1955
