= Jana Hit Sangh =

Political organisation in Nepal

Jana Hit Sangh (Nepali: जनहित संघ) was a political organisation in Nepal. It emerged following the 1959 elections. The group was formed by conservative and orthodox Hindu elite elements, who had tried to contest the election as independents but fared badly. The founders of Jana Hit Sangh were wary of the secular profile of the governing Nepali Congress. The organisation played an important role in rallying support for the 1960 royal takeover. The group had made vocal protests against the progressive policies of the Nepali Congress government, such as its taxation and land reforms. The group was considered to be an ultra-conservative organization.
