= Subarna Shamsher Rana cabinet =

Government of Nepal from in 1958

- Cabinet of Nepal
- May 1958–May 1958
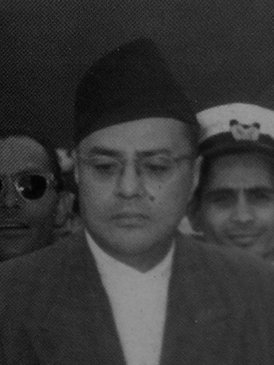
- Subarna Shamsher Rana
- Date formed: 15 May 1958
- Date dissolved: 27 May 1959

People and organisations
- Monarch: King Mahendra
- Prime Minister: Subarna Shamsher Rana
- Total no. of members: 6 appointments

History
- Predecessor: K.I. Singh cabinet, 1958
- Successor: B.P. Koirala cabinet, 1959

A cabinet was formed under the chairmanship of Subarna Shamsher Rana on 15 May 1958 by King Mahendra. The cabinet was formed to hold the 1959 election.

The cabinet was dissolved to make way for B.P. Koirala's elected government on 27 May 1959.

== Cabinet ==
Portfolio	Minister	Party	Took office	Left office
Chairman of the Council of Ministers; Minister for Finance and Planning	Subarna Shamsher Rana	Nepali Congress	15 May 1958	27 May 1959
Minister for Law and Parliament Affairs; Minister for Education, Health and Local Autonomous Administration; Minister for Industry and Commerce	Ranadhir Subba	Gorkha Parishad	15 May 1958	27 May 1959
Minister for Home Affairs	Dilli Raman Regmi	Nepali National Congress	15 May 1958	27 May 1959
Minister for Public Works and Communications	Chandra Bhusan Pande	Nepal Praja Parishad	15 May 1958	27 May 1959
Minister for Foreign Affairs; Minister for Defence	Purendra Bikram Shah	Independent	15 May 1958	27 May 1959
Minister for Forests, Agriculture, Food and Canals	Bhupalman Singh Karki	Independent	15 May 1958	27 May 1959
