= Marshall Julum Shakya =

Nepalese politician

Marshall Julum Shakya मार्शल जुलुम शाक्य

Minister of Construction, Transport and Supply
- In office 19 April 1990 – 11 May 1991
- Monarch: Birendra
- Prime Minister: Krishna Prasad Bhattarai
- Succeeded by: Khum Bahadur Khadka and Chiranjibi Wagle

Personal details
- Born: 9 October 1939 Kathmandu, Nepal
- Died: 6 May 2017 (aged 77) Kathmandu, Nepal
- Party: Nepali Congress
- Spouse: Shalina Panday Shakya
- Children: Shivani Shakya
- Cabinet: Krishna Prasad Bhattarai interim cabinet

Marshall Julum Shakya (Nepali: मार्शल जुलुम शाक्य; 9 October 1939 – 6 May 2017) was a Nepalese politician, belonging to the Nepali Congress. He was a founder member of Nepal Student Union established in March 1970. He spent 15 years in prison during the panchayat regime. As of 1988, he was the president of the Kathmandu District of Nepali Congress. During the 1990 Jana Andolan he was the convenor of the Central Action Committee of Nepali Congress, and one of the most prominent party leaders not under arrest.

== Early life ==
Marshall Julum Shakya was born on 9 October 1939 in Om Bahal to Tej Bahadur Shakya and Hasina Devi as their only son. He belonged to an ordinary family, his father worked for Himalaya Shumsher Rana, in His palace. He has one daughter Shivani Shakya, from his second wife.

Marshall Julum Shakya was first arrested on 15 December 1960 under the Public Security Act, immediately after King Mahendra staged a coup which removed the democratically elected government of the Nepali National Congress Party. A founder member and executive committee member of Amnesty International's Nepal Section, Mr. Shakya was again in prison from 1961 to 1967, and for one month in 1970. He was re-arrested in May 1973 in connection with a meeting organized by Ram Raja Prasad Singh. Mr. Shakya had reportedly been arrested at least nine times under the Public Security Act which provided for detention without charge or trial for up to 3 years. Mr. Shakya studied political science at Tribhuvan University, Kathmandu. He took an arts degree in economics in prison. Altogether he was imprisoned for 14 years and spent 2 years of his life underground in various parts of the country including Kathmandu valley. He was declared Prisoner of Conscience for 3 years while imprisoned in Nakhu Jail by Amnesty International, Ontario Section of Canada.

== Voice against the Coup ==
His contribution to the foundation of democracy in Nepal is exemplary. Immediately after the coup staged by King Mahendra he started chanting slogans against the King and His actions from his jeep in New Road; he was only 20 years old then. At that time he was given the task of arranging the upcoming central action committee meeting. As he was driving from Thapathali to Tripureshwor, the Prime minister's quarter was already surrounded by the army. He returned to Thapathali and saw that the stage set for the central committee meeting was already under army's control, he then returned to New Road. He fixed some audio equipment like mike, amplifier and battery to his jeep from a local vendor. It was Friday around 2 p.m. and the government office was closed for the day, the employees had already started gathering in New Road. The shelter of Pipal tree was full of people and so was New Road. People from outside the valley coming to Kathmandu used to gather there. He started miking against the coup from his jeep from Pipal tree to then Royal Nepal Airlines office and then back and forth. He slept at Thapathali that night.

Next morning he again chanted slogan against the King in the streets of Kathmandu driving through Ason, Indrachowk, Lainchur, Bagbazar and other various places. He was arrested by the police forces at Khicha Pokhari while he was driving towards Patan along with his friend Shankar Joshi, driver Hari Narayan, the jeep numbered 821 was also confiscated. He was kept at Hanuman Dhoka for few days and then later jailed in Nakhu.

== Political career ==
His political career was not so successful due to well established groupism and nepotism within Nepali Congress; the fact which confirmed his defeat in various internal elections within the party. He had to face three defeats in the parliamentary elections, defeat in leadership election of Nepal Student Union and incessant defeats in the elections for the central membership of Nepali Congress. He was first to voice for secularism in the government then formed by Krishna Prasad Bhattarai, he wanted to include secularism in the constitution of 2047 BS. His dream for secularism was finally fulfilled by the 2006 democracy movement in Nepal.

He is well known for his altruistic form of politics and his sacrifices for the greater good; differing from the current scenario in politics dogged by self interests. He was one of the founding members of Nepal Student Union(NSU), the sister organization of Nepali Congress, established in the 1970s. He served as the chairperson of District Committee of Nepali Congress in the 1990s. During the democratic movement of 1990, he also played the role of convener of Central Action Commission(CEC) of Nepali Congress. He also served as Minister of Construction, Transport and Supply in the Krishna Prasad Bhattarai interim cabinet led by Krishna Prasad Bhattarai in the 1990s.

== Death ==
He suffered from heart attack and brain hemorrhage and was admitted to Norvic International Hospital at Thapathali on 3 March 2017. Later, he was shifted to the Tokha-based Grande International Hospital. He succumbed to aspiration pneumonia, acute decompensated heart failure and refractory septic shock at the final stage at 9:07 am on 6 May 2017. Last rites were performed by his daughter as per the Shakya tradition at Teku Dovan; the merging point of rivers Bagmati and Bishnumati.
