= Kunwar Indrajit Singh cabinet =

Cabinet of Nepal (July–November 1957)

- Cabinet of Nepal
- July 1957–November 1957
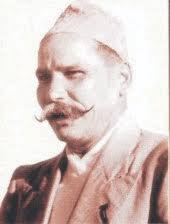
- Dr. K.I. Singh
- Date formed: 26 July 1957
- Date dissolved: 14 November 1957

People and organisations
- Monarch: King Mahendra
- Prime Minister: Kunwar Inderjit Singh
- Total no. of members: 11 appointments
- Member party: Samyukta Prajatantra Party

History
- Predecessor: Tanka Acharya cabinet, 1956
- Successor: S.B. Rana cabinet, 1958

Kunwar Inderjit Singh formed a government on 26 July 1957 after being appointed by King Mahendra. He replaced Tanka Prasad Acharya who had resigned on the same day.

The cabinet was dissolved by King Mahendra on 14 November 1957.

== Cabinet ==
Portfolio	Minister	Took office	Left office
Prime Minister Minister of Home Affairs Minister of Foreign Affairs	Hon. Kunwari Inderjit Singh	26 July 1957	14 November 1957
Minister of Defence	Purendra Bikram Shah	26 July 1957	14 November 1957
Minister for Industry and Commerce	Parshuram Bhakta Mathema	26 July 1957	14 November 1957
Minister of Finance Minister for Land Revenue	C.B. Singh	26 July 1957	14 November 1957
Minister for Law and Parliamentary Affairs	Dambar Bahadur Singh	26 July 1957	14 November 1957
Minister for Forest Department	Ramadhin Mahato	26 July 1957	14 November 1957
Minister for Planning	Jeevraj Sharma	26 July 1957	14 November 1957
Minister of Health	Kul Bahadur Limbu	26 July 1957	14 November 1957
Minister for Food and Agriculture	Bhupal Man Singh Karki	26 July 1957	14 November 1957
Minister for Public Works and Communications	Padma Narsingh Rana	26 July 1957	14 November 1957
Minister for Education Minister for Local Autonomous Administration	Laxmi Prasad Devkota	26 July 1957	14 November 1957
