= First Matrika Prasad Koirala cabinet =

Government of Nepal from 1951 to 1952

- Cabinet of Nepal
- November 1951–August 1952
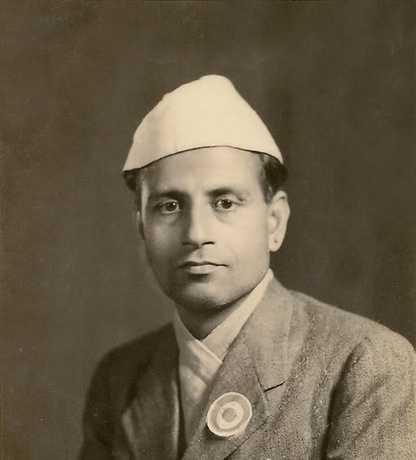
- M.P. Koirala
- Date formed: 16 November 1951
- Date dissolved: 14 August 1952

People and organisations
- Monarch: King Tribhuvan
- Prime Minister: Matrika Prasad Koirala
- Total no. of members: 14 appointments
- Member party: Nepali Congress

History
- Predecessor: Mohan SJB Rana cabinet, 1951
- Successor: M.P. Koirala cabinet, 1953

Matrika Prasad Koirala formed the first government of Nepal by a commoner after he was appointed as the prime minister by King Tribhuvan. The government was formed after the previous government under Mohan SJB Rana fell after Nepali Congress ministers resigned. King Tribhuvan made a royal proclamation on 16 November 1951 and invited Matrika Prasad Koirala from the Nepali Congress to form the government.

Matrika Prasad Koirala resigned on 14 August 1952 after dissent in the Nepali Congress against his working methods and was replaced by the direct rule of King Tribhuvan and his advisors.

== Cabinet ==
Portfolio	Minister	Affiliation	Took office	Left office
Prime Minister Minister for General Administration Minister of Foreign Affairs	Hon. Matrika Prasad Koirala	Nepali Congress	16 November 1951	14 August 1952
Minister of Finance	Subarna SJB Rana	Nepali Congress	16 November 1951	14 August 1952
Minister of Home Affairs Minister of Food	Surya Prasad Upadhyaya	Nepali Congress	16 November 1951	14 August 1952
Minister for Transportation	Bhadrakali Mishra	Nepali Congress	16 November 1951	14 August 1952
Minister for Agriculture, Livestock and Canals Minister of Land Management	Ganesh Man Singh	Nepali Congress	16 November 1951	14 August 1952
Minister of Defence	Kaiser SJB Rana	Rana regime	16 November 1951	14 August 1952
Minister for Industry, Commerce and Supplies	Mahendra Bikram Shah	Nepali Congress	16 November 1951	14 August 1952
Minister for Planning, Mines, Forest and Electricity	Mahabir SJB Rana	Rana regime	16 November 1951	14 August 1952
Minister for Parliamentary Affairs	Khadga Man Singh	Nepali Congress	16 November 1951	14 August 1952
Minister for Education	Sarda SJB Rana	Rana regime	16 November 1951	14 August 1952
Minister for Local Autonomous Administration	Narad Muni Thulung	Nepali Congress	16 November 1951	14 August 1952
Minister for Law and Justice	Bhagwati Prasad Singh	Nepali Congress	16 November 1951	14 August 1952
Minister of State for Health	Nar Bahadur Gurung	Nepali Congress	16 November 1951	14 August 1952
Minister of State for Forests	Dharma Ratna Yami	Nepali Congress	16 November 1951	14 August 1952
