= Nilambar Acharya =

Nepali minister and diplomat

His Excellency Nilambar Acharya
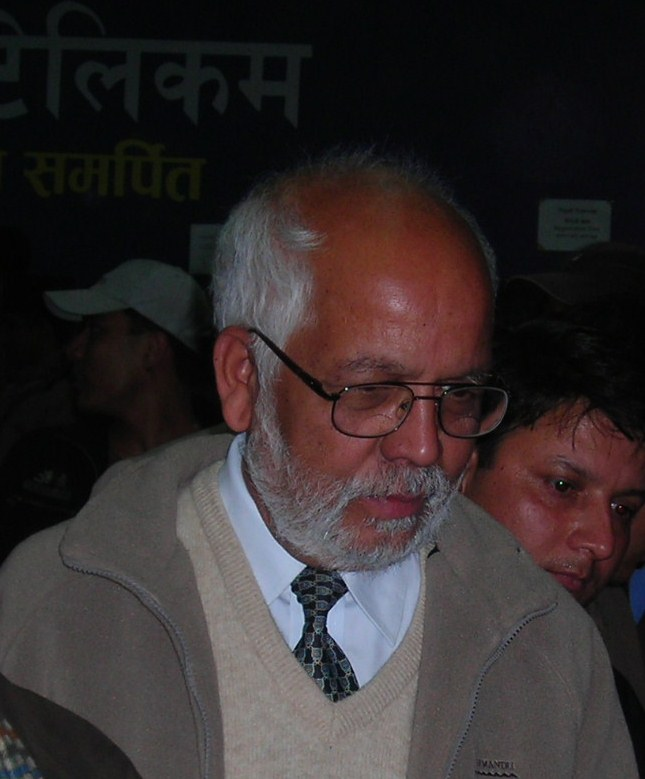

Former Ambassador of Nepal to India
- President: Bidhya Devi Bhandari

Minister of Labour and Social Welfare, Law and Tourism
- In office 19 April 1990 – 31 May 1999
- Monarch: Birendra Bir Bikram Shah
- Prime Minister: Krishna Prasad Bhattarai

Ambassador of Nepal to Sri Lanka
- In office 1996–2000
- Monarch: Birendra Bir Bikram Shah

Personal details
- Born: 1943 (age 82–83)
- Citizenship: Nepali
- Education: Tribhuvan University

Nilambar Acharya is the former minister of Nepal and the former ambassador of Nepal to India. He had also been ambassador to Sri Lanka. He has completed Bachelor in Law from Tribhuvan University and master in Journalism from Moscow State University, Russia.
