= Third Deuba cabinet =

Government of Nepal (2004–2005)

- Cabinet of Nepal
- June 2004–February 2005
- Date formed: 10 June 2004
- Date dissolved: 2 February 2005

People and organisations
- Monarch: King Gyanendra
- Prime Minister: Sher Bahadur Deuba
- Total no. of members: 31 appointments
- Member party: Nepali Congress (Democratic) CPN (UML) Rastriya Prajatantra Party Nepal Sadbhawana Party Independent

History
- Predecessor: Fifth Thapa cabinet
- Successor: King Gyanendra cabinet

The third Deuba cabinet of Nepal was formed on 10 June 2004 after the appointment of Sher Bahadur Deuba as prime minister by King Gyanendra. The cabinet was expanded on 5 July 2004 with the inclusion of CPN (UML), Rastriya Prajatantra Party and Nepal Sadbhawana Party.

The cabinet was dismissed on 1 February 2005 by King Gyanendra who assumed executive power.

== Cabinet ==
Portfolio	Minister	Party	Took office	Left office
Prime Minister of Nepal; Minister for Palace Affairs; Minister for Defence; Minister for Foreign Affairs	Sher Bahadur Deuba	Congress (Democratic)	10 June 2004	1 February 2005
Minister for Finance	Bharat Mohan Adhikari	CPN (UML)	5 July 2004	1 February 2005
Minister for Information and Communications	Mohammad Mohsin	Rastriya Prajatantra Party	5 July 2004	1 February 2005
Minister for Forests and Soil Conservation	Badri Prasad Mandal	Nepal Sadbhawana Party	5 July 2004	1 February 2005
Minister for Science and Technology	Balaram Gharti Magar	Rastriya Prajatantra Party	5 July 2004	1 February 2005
Minister for Education and Sports	Bimalendra Nidhi	Congress (Democratic)	10 June 2004	1 February 2005
Minister for Industry, Commerce and Supplies	Bimalendra Nidhi	Congress (Democratic)	10 June 2004	5 July 2004
Minister for Physical Planning and Construction	Prakash Man Singh	Congress (Democratic)	10 June 2004	1 February 2005
Minister for Health	Ashok Rai	CPN (UML)	5 July 2004	1 February 2005
Minister for Home Affairs	Purna Bahadur Khadka	Congress (Democratic)	5 July 2004	1 February 2005
Minister for Culture, Tourism and Civil Aviation	Dip Kumar Upadhaya	Congress (Democratic)	5 July 2004	1 February 2005
Minister for Industry, Commerce and Supplies	Ishwar Pokhrel	CPN (UML)	5 July 2004	1 February 2005
Minister for Local Development	Yubaraj Gyawali	CPN (UML)	5 July 2004	1 February 2005
Minister for Land Reform and Management	Jog Meher Shrestha	Rastriya Prajatantra Party	5 July 2004	1 February 2005
Minister for Agriculture and Cooperatives	Hom Nath Dahal	Congress (Democratic)	5 July 2004	1 February 2005
Minister for Labour and Transportation Management	Raghuji Pant	CPN (UML)	5 July 2004	1 February 2005
Minister for Population and Environment	Bachaspati Devkota	CPN (UML)	5 July 2004	1 February 2005
Minister for Women, Children and Social Welfare	Astalaxmi Shakya	CPN (UML)	5 July 2004	1 February 2005
Minister for Law, Justice and Parliamentary Affairs	Tek Bahadur Chokhyal	Congress (Democratic)	5 July 2004	1 February 2005
Minister for General Administration	Krishna Lal Thakali	Independent	5 July 2004	1 February 2005
Ministers of State
Minister of State for Water Supply	Thakur Prasad Sharma	Independent	5 July 2004	1 February 2005
Minister of State for Foreign Affairs	Prakash Sharan Mahat	Congress (Democratic)	5 July 2004	1 February 2005
Minister of State for Local Development	Krishna Gopal Shrestha	CPN (UML)	5 July 2004	1 February 2005
Minister of State for Education and Sports	Bal Krishna Khand	Congress (Democratic)	5 July 2004	1 February 2005
Minister of State for Labour and Transportation Management	Urba Dutta Pant	CPN (UML)	5 July 2004	1 February 2005
Minister of State for Health	Bansidhar Mishra	CPN (UML)	5 July 2004	1 February 2005
Minister of State for Science and Technology	Pratibha Rana	Rastriya Prajatantra Party	5 July 2004	1 February 2005
Minister of State for Land Reform and Management	Ram Chandra Raya	Rastriya Prajatantra Party	5 July 2004	1 February 2005
Assistant Minister
Assistant Minister for Agriculture and Cooperatives	Uma Kanta Chaudhary	Congress (Democratic)	5 July 2004	1 February 2005
Assistant Minister for Population and Environment	Lal Bahadur Bishwakarma	CPN (UML)	5 July 2004	1 February 2005
Assistant Minister for Physical Planning and Construction	Hari Shankar Pariyar	Congress (Democratic)	5 July 2004	1 February 2005
Assistant Minister for Culture, Tourism and Civil Aviation	Bhim Kumari Budha Magar	Congress (Democratic)	5 July 2004	1 February 2005
