= Fourth Chand cabinet =

Government of Nepal from 2002 to 2003

- Cabinet of Nepal
- October 2002–June 2003
- Date formed: 11 October 2002
- Date dissolved: 5 June 2003

People and organisations
- Monarch: King Gyanendra
- Prime Minister: Lokendra Bahadur Chand
- Deputy Prime Minister: Badri Prasad Mandal
- Total no. of members: 22 appointments
- Member party: Rastriya Prajatantra Party Nepal Sadbhawana Party Independent

History
- Predecessor: Second Deuba cabinet
- Successor: Fifth Thapa cabinet

The fourth Chand cabinet was formed on 11 October 2002 after Lokendra Bahadur Chand was appointed as prime minister by King Gyanendra, The cabinet only had representatives from two political parties of the dissolved House of Representatives. The cabinet was expanded on 18 November 2002. The cabinet was reshuffled on 11 April 2003.

The cabinet was dissolved on 4 June 1993 after Chand resigned 5 days prior and was replaced by Surya Bahadur Thapa.

== Cabinet ==
=== October 2002–April 2003 ===
Portfolio	Minister	Party	Took office	Left office
Prime Minister of Nepal; Minister for Palace Affairs	Lokendra Bahadur Chand	Rastriya Prajatantra Party	11 October 2002	4 June 2003
Deputy Prime Minister; Minister for Agriculture and Cooperatives; Minister for Local Development	Badri Prasad Mandal	Nepal Sadbhawana Party	11 October 2002	4 June 2003
Minister for Education and Sports	Devi Prasad Ojha	Independent	18 November 2002	11 April 2003
Minister for Finance	Badri Prasad Shrestha	Independent	11 October 2002	4 June 2003
Minister for Education and Sports	Badri Prasad Shrestha	Independent	11 October 2002	18 November 2002
Minister for Foreign Affairs	Narendra Bikram Shah	Independent	11 October 2002	4 June 2003
Minister for Home Affairs; Minister for Law, Justice and Parliamentary Affairs	Dharma Bahadur Thapa	Independent	11 October 2002	11 April 2003
Minister for Women, Children and Social Welfare	Gore Bahadur Khapangi	Independent	11 October 2002	4 June 2003
Minister for Health; Minister for Science and Technology	Upendra Devkota	Independent	11 October 2002	4 June 2003
Minister for Physical Planning and Construction	Narayan Singh Pun	Independent	11 October 2002	4 June 2003
Minister for Land Reform and Management; Minister for Forests and Soil Conservation	Badri Narayan Basnet	Independent	11 October 2002	4 June 2003
Minister for Labour and Transportation Management; Minister for Population and Environment	Kamal Prasad Chaulagai	Independent	11 October 2002	4 June 2003
Minister for Culture, Tourism and Civil Aviation	Kuber Prasad Sharma	Independent	11 October 2002	4 June 2003
Minister for Industry, Commerce and Supplies	Mahesh Lal Pradhan	Independent	11 October 2002	11 April 2003
Minister for Water Supply	Deepak Gyawali	Independent	11 October 2002	4 June 2003
Assistant Ministers
Assistant Minister for Women, Children and Social Welfare	Anuradha Koirala	Independent	11 October 2002	4 June 2003
Assistant Minister for Population and Environment	Gopal Dahit	Independent	11 October 2002	4 June 2003
Assistant Minister for Culture, Tourism and Civil Aviation	Ravi Bhakta Shrestha	Independent	11 October 2002	4 June 2003
Assistant Minister for Industry, Commerce and Supplies	Jagat Bahadur Gurung	Independent	11 October 2002	4 June 2003
Assistant Minister for Education and Sports	Rabindra Khanal	Independent	11 October 2002	4 June 2003
Assistant Minister for Local Development	Asarphi Shah	Independent	11 October 2002	4 June 2003
Assistant Minister for Land Reform and Management	Prakash Chitrakar Pariyar	Independent	11 October 2002	4 June 2003

=== April–June 2003 ===
Portfolio	Minister	Party	Took office	Left office
Prime Minister of Nepal; Minister for Palace Affairs	Lokendra Bahadur Chand	Rastriya Prajatantra Party	11 October 2002	4 June 2003
Deputy Prime Minister; Minister for Agriculture and Cooperatives; Minister for Local Development	Badri Prasad Mandal	Nepal Sadbhawana Party	11 October 2002	4 June 2003
Minister for Home Affairs	Badri Prasad Mandal	Nepal Sadbhawana Party	11 April 2003	4 June 2003
Minister for Information and Communications; Minister for General Administration	Ramesh Nath Pandey	Independent	11 April 2003	4 June 2003
Minister for Education and Sports	Devi Prasad Ojha	Independent	18 November 2002	4 June 2003
Minister for Finance	Badri Prasad Shrestha	Independent	11 October 2002	4 June 2003
Minister for Foreign Affairs	Narendra Bikram Shah	Independent	11 October 2002	4 June 2003
Minister for Women, Children and Social Welfare	Gore Bahadur Khapangi	Independent	11 October 2002	4 June 2003
Minister for Health; Minister for Science and Technology	Upendra Devkota	Independent	11 October 2002	4 June 2003
Minister for Physical Planning and Construction	Narayan Singh Pun	Independent	11 October 2002	4 June 2003
Minister for Land Reform and Management; Minister for Forests and Soil Conservation	Badri Narayan Basnet	Independent	11 October 2002	4 June 2003
Minister for Labour and Transportation Management; Minister for Population and Environment	Kamal Prasad Chaulagai	Independent	11 October 2002	4 June 2003
Minister for Culture, Tourism and Civil Aviation	Kuber Prasad Sharma	Independent	11 October 2002	4 June 2003
Minister for Water Supply	Deepak Gyawali	Independent	11 October 2002	4 June 2003
Assistant Ministers
Assistant Minister for Women, Children and Social Welfare	Anuradha Koirala	Independent	11 October 2002	4 June 2003
Assistant Minister for Population and Environment	Gopal Dahit	Independent	11 October 2002	4 June 2003
Assistant Minister for Culture, Tourism and Civil Aviation	Ravi Bhakta Shrestha	Independent	11 October 2002	4 June 2003
Assistant Minister for Industry, Commerce and Supplies	Jagat Bahadur Gurung	Independent	11 October 2002	4 June 2003
Assistant Minister for Education and Sports	Rabindra Khanal	Independent	11 October 2002	4 June 2003
Assistant Minister for Local Development	Asarphi Shah	Independent	11 October 2002	4 June 2003
Assistant Minister for Land Reform and Management	Prakash Chitrakar Pariyar	Independent	11 October 2002	4 June 2003
