= Kamal Prasad Chaulagain =

Nepalese politician

Dan Bahadur Chaudhari

Personal details
- Party: Communist Party of Nepal (Marxist-Leninist)

Kamal Prasad Chaulagain is a Nepalese politician. He was elected to the parliament in 1991, then belonging to the Samyukta Janamorcha Nepal. When the Samyukta Janamorcha Nepal split in 1994, he sided with the group of Nirmal Lama (the other, more militant, section would form the Communist Party of Nepal (Maoist)).

He contested the 1994 legislative election in the Ramechap-2 constituency, coming second with 7215 votes.

In 1995 Chaulagain deserted the SJM and joined the Communist Party of Nepal (Unified Marxist-Leninist).

When the CPN(UML) split in 1998, Chaulagain joined the break-away Communist Party of Nepal (Marxist-Leninist). He became a Central Committee member of CPN(ML). When CPN(ML) reunified with CPN(UML) in 2002, he rejoined CPN(UML) and became a Central Committee member of the party.

On November 8, 2002, Chaulagain resigned from CPN(UML). A few days after leaving CPN(UML), he was appointed by King Gyanendra as Minister for Labour and Transport Management as well as Minister for Population and Environment in the cabinet led by Lokendra Bahadur Chand.

Chaulagain is the Chief Adviser of the National Integrated Study and Research Centre of Nepal, an organization that maintains links with North Korea.
