= Fifth Surya Bahadur Thapa cabinet =

Government of Nepal from 2003 to 2004

- Cabinet of Nepal
- October 2002–June 2003
- Date formed: 11 June 2003
- Date dissolved: 10 June 2004

People and organisations
- Monarch: King Gyanendra
- Prime Minister: Surya Bahadur Thapa
- Total no. of members: 10 appointments
- Member party: Rastriya Prajatantra Party Independent

History
- Predecessor: Fourth Chand cabinet
- Successor: Third Deuba cabinet

The fifth Surya Bahadur Thapa cabinet was formed on 11 June 2003 after King Gyanendra appointed Surya Bahadur Thapa as prime minister. The ministers were assigned extra portfolios on 1 August 2003.

Surya Bahadur Thapa tendered his resignation to the king on 7 May 2004. The cabinet was dissolved on 10 June 2004, following the appointment of Sher Bahadur Deuba as prime minister.

== Cabinet ==
Portfolio	Minister	Party	Took office	Left office
Prime Minister of Nepal; Minister for Palace Affairs	Surya Bahadur Thapa	Rastriya Prajatantra Party	11 June 2003	10 June 2004
Minister for Finance	Prakash Chandra Lohani	Rastriya Prajatantra Party	11 June 2003	10 June 2004
Minister for Agriculture and Cooperatives; Minister for Labour and Transportation Management	Prakash Chandra Lohani	Rastriya Prajatantra Party	1 August 2003	10 June 2004
Minister for Information and Communications	Kamal Thapa	Rastriya Prajatantra Party	11 June 2003	10 June 2004
Minister for Local Development	Kamal Thapa	Rastriya Prajatantra Party	1 August 2003	10 June 2004
Minister for Health	Kamal Thapa	Rastriya Prajatantra Party	1 August 2003	3 March 2004
Minister for Home Affairs	Kamal Thapa	Rastriya Prajatantra Party	3 March 2004	10 June 2004
Minister for Foreign Affairs; Minister for Health	Bhesh Bahadur Thapa	Independent	3 March 2004	10 June 2004
Minister for Education and Sports	Hari Bahadur Basnet	Rastriya Prajatantra Party	11 June 2003	10 June 2004
Minister for Industry, Commerce and Supplies; Minister for Law, Justice and Parliamentary Affairs	Hari Bahadur Basnet	Rastriya Prajatantra Party	1 August 2003	10 June 2004
Minister for Physical Planning and Construction	Budhhiman Tamang	Rastriya Prajatantra Party	11 June 2003	10 June 2004
Minister for Population and Environment; Minister for General Administration	Budhhiman Tamang	Rastriya Prajatantra Party	1 August 2003	10 June 2004
Minister for Culture, Tourism and Civil Aviation	Sarbendra Nath Shukla	Rastriya Prajatantra Party	11 June 2003	7 April 2004
Minister for Land Reform and Management; Minister for Forests and Soil Conservation	Sarbendra Nath Shukla	Rastriya Prajatantra Party	1 August 2003	7 April 2004
Ministers of State
Minister of State for Women, Children and Social Welfare	Renu Kumari Yadav	Rastriya Prajatantra Party	11 June 2003	10 June 2004
Minister of State for Science and Technology	Renu Kumari Yadav	Rastriya Prajatantra Party	1 August 2003	10 June 2004
