= Rastriya Praja Party =

Rastriya Praja Party राष्ट्रिय प्रजा पार्टी
- Leader: Matrika Prasad Koirala
- Split from: Nepali Congress

Rastriya Praja Party was a political party in Nepal, founded in 1952 when Matrika Prasad Koirala broke away from the Nepali Congress. As the leader of the party, M.P. Koirala was appointed prime minister by the King. The party did however, not develop any major support base of its own. A splinter group of the party did later join the Praja Parishad of Tanka Prasad Acharya.

== See also ==
- M.P. Koirala cabinet, 1953
