= Nepali Jan Congress =

Nepali Jan Congress was a political party in Nepal. The party was led by Bhadra Kali Misra. In 1954 it was included into the national government. The party later merged into the Praja Parishad of Tanka Prasad Acharya.
