= Saroj Prasad Koirala =

Nepali politician

Saroj Prasad Koirala was a Nepali politician. He was assassinated in 1973 when he was in exile in India.

== Assassination ==
Saroj Koirala was assassinated on 18 October 1973 at Madhubani railway station, India. Nepal's King Birendra was in India on an official visit during that time. The assassination was never investigated.

== Recognition ==
In 2006, the Nepal government recognized his contribution to the country by issuing a postage stamp with his portrait.

== Personal life ==
Koirala was married to Lila, a Nepali politician and former minister for Women and Social Welfare. Koirala is a cousin of BP Koirala.

Koirala is one among ten leaders of the Nepali Congress Party who were assassinated or were close to being assassinated during Nepal's Panchayat Period.
