= Samyukta Prajatantra Party =

United Democratic Party Nepal संयुक्त प्रजातन्त्र पार्टी नेपाल
- Founder: Kunwar Inderjit Singh
- Founded: October 1955
- Ideology: Populism
- Political position: Centre

Samyukta Prajatantra Party Nepal (Nepali: संयुक्त प्रजातन्त्र पार्टी नेपाल, translation: United Democracy Party Nepal) was a political party in Nepal. The party was led by Kunwar Inderjit Singh.

== History ==
In October 1955, after his arrival from China, where he was in hiding after escaping from prison, Kunwar Inderjit Singh announced the formation of the United Democratic Party Nepal. The party was formed as a nationalist force that was an alternative to the parties that existed in the country.

On 26 July 1957, Dr. K.I. Singh was appointed as the prime minister by King Mahendra and told to form a coalition government. He failed to do so as other political parties distrusted him. He was sacked less than four months later by the king after he attempted to reform the palace secretariat.

The party contested the first general elections in 1959, winning 5 seats to the House of Representatives. Party founder and chairman, Dr. K.I. Singh did not win his seat in the election. He accused the Nepali Congress-led interim government of interfering in the elections and called for the king to declare the elections invalid. The party formed the United Front with Tanka Prasad Acharya's Nepal Praja Parishad which had won two seats in the elections and the Prajatantrik Mahasabha led by Ranganath Sharma which had been unsuccessful in the elections. The United Front claimed to be the opposition to Nepali Congress-led government and said the opposition in the parliament, Nepal Rashtrabadi Gorkha Parishad was in Dr. K.I. Singh's own word "the same thing as the Congress" The United Democratic Party also managed to convince the two parliamentarians from Acharya's Nepal Praja Parishad to join the party. On 15 December 1960, King Mahendra dissolved the parliament and started his own direct rule, a move that Dr. K.I. Singh supported. All political parties were banned and the party-less Rastriya Panchayat served as the country's legislature.

== Electoral history ==
| Election | Votes | % | Seats | Position | Resulting government |
|---|---|---|---|---|---|
| 1959 | 177,408 | 9.9 | 5 / 109 | 3rd | In opposition |

== Leadership ==
=== Prime ministers of Nepal ===
| Prime Minister | Portrait | Term in Office | | | Cabinet |
| Prime Minister | Portrait | Start | End | Tenure | Cabinet |
|---|---|---|---|---|---|
| Kunwar Inderjit Singh | | 26 July 1957 | 15 November 1957 | 112 days | K.I. Singh, 1957 |
