= Krishna Prasad Bhattarai interim cabinet =

Government of Nepal from 1990 to 1991

1990 Bhattarai Interim cabinet
- Cabinet of Nepal

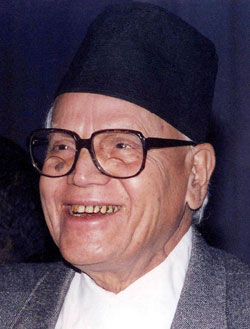
- Date formed: 19 April 1990
- Date dissolved: 11 May 1991

People and organisations
- Monarch: King Birendra
- Head of government: Krishna Prasad Bhattarai
- Member party: Nepali Congress; CPN UML; Independent

History
- Successor: First G.P. Koirala Cabinet

On Baisakh 6,2047 BS, an interim government headed by Nepali Congress leader Krishna Prasad Bhattarai was formed . The cabinet included 4 Ministers from the Nepali Congress, 3 From leftist front, 2 independent and 2 nominated by the king .

== Final arrangements ==
Portfolio	Minister
Cabinet ministers
Interim Prime Minister Minister of Defence Minister of Foreign Affairs	Krishna Prasad Bhattarai
Minister of Industry and Commerce	Sahana Pradhan
Minister of Home Affairs and Communication	Yog Prasad Upadhyay
Minister of Construction, Transport and Supply	Marshall Julum Shakya
Minister for Water, Resources and Local Development	Mahendra Narayan Nidhi
Minister of Forest, Land Reforms And Agriculture	Jhala Nath Khanal
Minister of Labour and Social Welfare, Law and Tourism	Nilambar Acharya
Minister of Finance	Devendra Raj Pandey
Minister of Health	Mathura Prasad Shrestha
Minister of Housing and Physical Planning	Achyutraj Regmi
Minister of Education and Culture and General Administration	Keshar Jung Rayamajhi

== See also ==
- Krishna Prasad Bhattarai
