= Tanka Prasad Acharya cabinet =

Government of Nepal from 1956 to 1957

- Cabinet of Nepal
- January 1956–July 1957
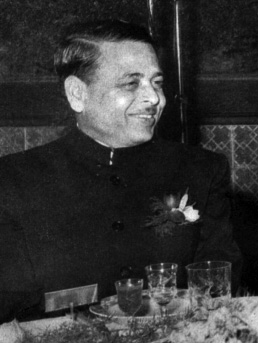
- Tanka Prasad Acharya
- Date formed: 27 January 1956
- Date dissolved: 26 July 1957

People and organisations
- Monarch: King Mahendra
- Prime Minister: Tanka Prasad Acharya
- Total no. of members: 18 appointments
- Member party: Nepal Praja Parishad

History
- Predecessor: M.P. Koirala cabinet, 1953
- Successor: K.I. Singh cabinet, 1957

Tanka Prasad Acharya formed a government on 27 January 1956 after being appointed as prime minister by King Mahendra. The cabinet was expanded in February 1957 to add more deputy ministers.

Acharya resigned on 26 July 1957 after informing the king that he could not hold the scheduled elections in November of the same year and was replaced by Kunwar Inderjit Singh on the same day.

== Cabinets ==
=== January 1956–February 1957 ===
Portfolio	Minister	Took office	Left office
Prime Minister Minister of Home Affairs Minister for General Administration	Hon. Tanka Prasad Acharya	27 January 1956	26 July 1957
Minister of Foreign Affairs Minister for Forest Department Minister for Food and Agriculture	Chuda Prasad Sharma	27 January 1956	26 July 1957
Minister of Finance Minister for Land Revenue Minister for Planning Minister for Industry and Commerce	Gunja Man Singh	27 January 1956	26 July 1957
Minister for Public Works and Communications	Pashupati Nath Ghosh	27 January 1956	26 July 1957
Minister of Defence	Purendra Bikram Singh	27 January 1956	26 July 1957
Minister for Education Minister of Health Minister for Local Autonomous Administration	Balchandra Sharma	27 January 1956	26 July 1957
Minister for Law and Parliamentary Affairs	Anirudra Prasad Singh	27 January 1956	5 February 1957

=== February 1957–July 1957 ===
Portfolio	Minister	Took office	Left office
Minister for Law and Parliamentary Affairs	Arun SJB Rana	5 February 1957	26 July 1957
State Minister for Ministry of Planning	Kiran SJB Rana	5 February 1957	26 July 1957
State Minister for Ministry of General Administration State Minister for Ministry of Home Affairs	Ranga Nath Sharma	5 February 1957	26 July 1957
Deputy Minister for Industry and Commerce	Kashi Raj Upadhyaya	5 February 1957	26 July 1957
Deputy Minister for Forest Department	Nageshwar Jha	5 February 1957	26 July 1957
Deputy Minister for Food and Agriculture	Surya Bahadur Bhardwaj	5 February 1957	26 July 1957
Deputy Minister of Finance	Ratna Prasad Kharel	11 February 1957	26 July 1957
Deputy Minister for Land Revenue	Devman Angdambe	11 February 1957	26 July 1957
Deputy Minister for Public Works and Communications	Pushkar Nath Upreti	25 February 1957	26 July 1957
Deputy Minister for Local Autonomous Administration	Chhimananda Mahato	25 February 1957	26 July 1957
Deputy Minister of Health	Khagendra Jang Gurung	3 March 1957	26 July 1957
