= 2005 Nepal coup d'état =

Part of the Nepalese Civil War

- Part of Nepalese Civil War
| Date | 1 February 2005 |
| Location | Kathmandu, Nepal |
| Result | Royal coup d'état successful: Parliament of Nepal dismissed |

Belligerents
| Kingdom of Nepal | Parliament of Nepal |

Commanders and leaders
| Gyanendra | Sher Bahadur Deuba |

A coup d'état in Nepal began on 1 February, when democratically elected members of the country's ruling party, the Nepali Congress, were deposed by Gyanendra, King of Nepal. The parliament was reinstated in 2006, when the king agreed to give up absolute power following the 2006 revolution. The coup was condemned by India, France, the United Kingdom, and the United States.

== Background ==
The Nepalese Government was previously ruled as an absolute monarchy following the 1960 Nepal coup d'état led by King Mahendra until it became a constitutional monarchy in 1991 during King Birendra's reign. King Gyanendra came into power after the Nepalese royal massacre where ten members of the royal family, including King Birendra, Queen Aishwarya, and Crown Prince Dipendra were killed. King Gyanendra was unpopular, and had dismissed three governments in time from 2002 to 2004 . Nepal had no parliament from 2002.

== Key events that unfolded before the coup ==
- In February 1990, the main underground parties announced the launch of Jana Andolan, or Movement for the Restoration of Democracy (MRD), which consisted of nationwide strikes and protests. The government initially resisted the pressure but in mid-April 1990, after scores of demonstrators were killed by the security forces in Kathmandu, King Birendra gave in to the demand to lift the ban on political parties and create a democratic state. The King appointed an interim government, which oversaw the drafting of a new constitution.
- Democracy, however, did not bring stability. Thirteen governments had been formed and been disbanded since the first general elections in 1991 until 2004. Most of the governments had relied on unstable coalitions to obtain the majority of votes needed to form a government. The Nepali Congress Party won a majority of seats in the 1999 elections, but a power struggle within its leadership ranks made for a government without credibility. The incapacity of political leaders to deliver promised changes, charges of corruption and incompetence, and constant in-fighting among political leaders had caused voters to lose faith in the established political leaders.
- The massacre of almost the entire royal family on 1 June 2001 plunged Nepal into an unprecedented state of crisis. The news shocked the nation. Thousands of people took to the streets, openly displaying signs of mourning for King Birendra. Gyanendra, the brother of the murdered King Birendra and the nearest surviving male kin, was ushered in as the next monarch. The fact that Gyanendra alone among Birendra's siblings survived created an aura of suspicion and rumor-mongering that continues to affect the credibility of the monarch at that time. Gyanendra at that time was in Pokhara attending an event, when he was escorted in a military helicopter to Kathmandu, while his wife Komal, who was present at the shooting, was later discharged after 4 weeks from the hospital after sustaining injury from the shooting. Close aides to Gyanendra have later revealed in several TV interviews that Gyanendra initially thought army had done a coup when he was being escorted from Pokhara by the military.
- The political instability that followed the royal massacre and the ongoing conflict quickly ended Nepal's brief experiment with democracy. In August 2002, Prime Minister Deuba dissolved all local elected bodies, and shortly thereafter he dissolved the national parliament, fearing a vote of no confidence against him. Then on 4 October 2002, King Gyanendra suspended the democratic phase that had begun in 1990. He sacked the prime minister, postponed elections indefinitely, assumed executive authority himself, and appointed his own prime minister and cabinet.
- When he fired Mr. Deuba, the king also indefinitely postponed the elections, scheduled to start 13 November. The king said Mr. Deuba was incompetent and incapable of holding the elections on time after the prime minister asked for a one-year postponement because of fears the rebels would disrupt them and party infighting.
- King Gyanendra cited Article 127 of the Constitution to justify his act: "If any difficulty arises in connection with the implementation of this Constitution, His Majesty may issue necessary orders to remove such difficulty, and such orders shall be laid before Parliament." Other sections of the Constitution, however, unambiguously deny the King the authority to appoint his own prime minister and cabinet. Article 36(1) of the Constitution directs the King to appoint the leader of the majority party in parliament as prime minister. If this is impossible––for example, if there is a successful vote of no-confidence against the prime minister or if there is no clear majority in parliament and no agreement on a coalition––then the King may dissolve parliament but elections must be held within six months of such dissolution.
- After 1 week of holding the power, the King then appointed Lokendra Bahadur Chand as the prime minister who held office until 5 June 2003. After increasing protests from the political parties and increase in intensity of attacks from the Maoists, Chand was forced to resign.
- Surya Bahadur Thapa who belonged to the same pro-monarchist party as his predecessor, was then appointed as the prime minister. Although he was a royalist, he had joined the other political parties in criticizing the King for firing the elected prime minister and postponing elections.
- Thapa then had the task of forming a cabinet including all major political parties.
- Maoist rebels and the interim administration had also signed a truce and held two rounds of peace talks.
- At the beginning of April 2004, there were "anti-regression" demonstrations in Kathmandu organized by five political parties. Despite thousands of arrests, the protests continued. Finally, on May 7, 2004, Prime Minister Surya Bahadur Thapa resigned. The King invited representatives of all the political parties, including the five agitating parties, for consultations.
- The five party coalition, which had been so successful in organizing the "anti-regression" movement, could not generate a consensus candidate for the next Prime Minister.
- Nearly four weeks later, on 2 June 2004, in the absence of a consensus nomination by the political parties, the King appointed Sher Bahadur Deuba as Prime Minister. Deuba, the leader of the Nepali Congress Party (Democratic), a break-away faction of the Nepali Congress Party, was the Prime Minister who in 2002 had suspended local assemblies.
- After weeks of intense negotiations, most of the political parties agreed to give up their protests and join Deuba's cabinet to form a multi-party government. The fragile coalition cabinet was under intense pressure to lead the country into peace talks and elections.
- PM Deuba had vowed to push ahead with elections in April, announced 9% increase in defence budget. Maoists reiterated their aim to obstruct polls, while political parties remained divided. Heavy fighting continued in eastern and western districts: clashes in Kailali district 5 January, 2005 reportedly claimed at least 55 lives; fighting in eastern area of Ilam 20 January killed 29 soldiers.
- Meanwhile, Maoists who had previously agreed government's 13 January, 2005 deadline for talk ignored it, claiming the government lacked authority to negotiate.

== Coup ==
Gyanendra took complete control for the second time, on 1 February 2005, after dismissing Prime Minister Sher Bahadur Deuba's government for failing to make arrangements for parliamentary elections and being unable to restore peace in the country, which was then in the midst of a civil war led by Maoist insurgents.

On 1 February, King Gyanendra declared a state of emergency and dissolved the parliament of Nepal. The members of parliament were put under house arrest, "key constitutional rights were suspended, soldiers enforced complete censorship, and communications were cut".

The king's rule lasted for over a year, until 24 April 2006, when the king agreed to give up absolute power and to reinstate the dissolved House of Representatives, following the Loktantra Andolan.

== Reactions ==
The coup was condemned by India, the United Kingdom, and the United States, who had prior supported the Royal Nepali Army in its fight against insurgency.The 2005 Nepal coup d'état alienated the foreign supporters and donors of Royal Nepali Army and His majesty Government of Nepal. This coup also became a key part and arguably the main reason for 2006 Nepalese revolution and end of shah monarchy in Nepal. The coup was possible due to unwavering loyalty of Royal Nepali Army to King who was its supreme commander in chief

== Aftermath ==
Immediately following the takeover, the Government led by Prime minister was ended. The king announced he would be forming government and be "chairman of council of Ministers" essentially a direct executive king. In the time period from 2005-2006 ad, of king rule, the freedom of expression were curbed, partly on that citing Maoist insurgency. The media houses were ban from publishing critical position against the King and in large the government itself. Initially, the people were indifferent or, even some section were positive view or expectation that King might able to end war, which was due to real and perceived incompetence of the mainstream parties. King did try to court other powers to support the takeover, though, much of power exception of China were critical of the takeover, specially India, who perceived action as a direct slap from the king, on its suggestion to king to work with democratic parties. But both India, and USA, maintain behind scene talk with king, not fully cutting aids to Royal Nepali army but downgrading it. The coup in domestic front, caused parties to be desperate which was main cause of 12 Points agreement with maoist, and also, the seed of Jana andolan. Today, the move is consider a grave miscalculation, specially how long the king ruled, and also how much support king had, towards 2006 ad, which blinded the King and royal government to public which essentially give the death note of historic monarchy.
