= Purendra Bikram Shah =

Shri Sahebju Purendra Bikram Shah
- Shri Sahebju; His Excellency; Foreign Minister of Nepal; Defence Minister of Nepal
- Born: 20 January 1900; Hanuman Dhoka Palace, Basantapur, Kathmandu
- Died: 1 May 1976 (aged 75–76); Chapkaiya Villa Durbar, Birganj, Nepal
- Spouse: Sahebju Rani Lila Rajyalaxmi
- Issue: Riddhi Rajya Lakshmi Shah; Madhuri Rajya Lakshmi Shah; Tarini Bikram Shah
Names
- Shri Sahebju Purendra Bikram Shah
- House: Shah dynasty (by birth)
- Father: General Sahebju Jharendra Bikram Shah of Nepal
- Mother: Sahebju Rani Nayan Rajya Lakshmi
- Religion: Hindu

Purendra Bikram Shah

Royal Advisory Council Nepal
- In office 1955–1956
- Monarch: Mahendra of Nepal

Minister of Defence of Nepal
- In office 1956–1958
- Monarch: Mahendra of Nepal

Minister of Foreign Affairs of Nepal
- In office 1958–1959
- Monarch: Mahendra of Nepal
- Preceded by: Kunwar Inderjit Singh
- Succeeded by: Bishweshwar Prasad Koirala

Shri Sahebju Purendra Bikram Shah Subikhyat-Tri-Shakti-Patta, Suprasidha-Prabala-Gorkha-Dakshina-Bahu, GCMG (20 January 1900 – 1 May 1976) was a senior member of the Nepalese Royal clan. He was member of the Royal Advisory Council formed by King Mahendra of Nepal in 1955 as an independent member nominated by the King, a close relative. He also held other key portfolios as Minister including Defence (1956-1958) and Foreign (1958-1959) of Nepal.

== Life ==
Sahebju Purendra's alma mater was the University of Allahabad. After the downfall of the Rana regime in 1951, he became heavily involved in affairs of state as a close ally of King Mahendra of Nepal. In 1955, he was nominated as member of the King's 5 man Advisory Council as an independent candidate. He then went onto serving as Foreign and Defence Minister of Nepal during key turning points of history including the admission of Nepal into the United Nations in 1955 as well as the State Visits carried out by King Mahendra of Nepal to China, United Kingdom, United States, Soviet Union etc. Sahebju Purendra played a key role in the changing dynamics of Nepal's foreign policy in bringing her out of isolation As Minister for Foreign Affairs, he led several high level delegations on Official Visits to China, United States, United Nations, India, United Kingdom, France, Belgrade Serbia amongst others.

He became member of the Rajya Sabha, Upper House of Parliament in 1962.

== Honours ==
National honours

- Member of the Order of Three Divine Powers, 1st class.
- Member of the Order of the Gurkha Right Hand, 1st class.
- King Tribhuvan Coronation Medal (20 February 1913).
- King Tribhuvan Silver Jubilee Medal (1935).
- King Mahendra Coronation Medal (2 May 1956).
- King Birendra Coronation Medal (25 February 1975).

Foreign honours

- Knight Grand Cross of The Most Distinguished Order of St Michael and St George [GCMG] (1961).
