= Naradmuni Thulung =

Nepali politician

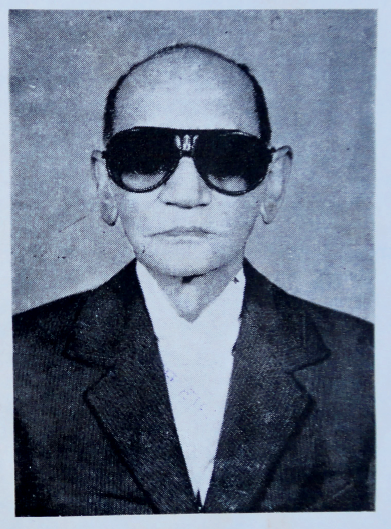
- Born: 1965 Chaitra 27 VS (8 April 1909 AD)
- Died: 2047 Magh 22 VS (5 February 1991 AD)
- Notable work: Politician, writer

Naradmuni Thulung

Naradmuni Thulung (Nepali: नारदमुनी थुलुङ) was a Nepalese politician, belonging to the Nepali Congress. He was an anti-Rana democratic politician. He took charge of the Bhojpur Front during the 1951 democratic revolution of Nepal. In November 1951 he became Minister of Local Self-Development in the cabinet of Matrika Prasad Koirala. He held the position until August 1952. He also served as Defence minister and acted as Prime Minister during Matrika P Koirala's premiership. Thulung became the chairman of the Royal Land Reform Commission. Under Thulung's chairmanship the commission suggested introduction of land limits, tenancy and agriculture loans. These reforms were, however, not implemented. He was born on Chaitra 27, 1965 Vikram Samvat and died on Magh 22, 2047 Vikram Samvat (8 April 1909 to 5 February 1991 AD).

== Book ==
Kiratko Nalibeli (किरातको नालीबेली)
