= 1959 Nepalese general election =

- 18 February–3 April 1959

All 109 seats in the House of Representatives 55 seats needed for a majority
- Registered: 4,246,368
- Turnout: 1,791,381
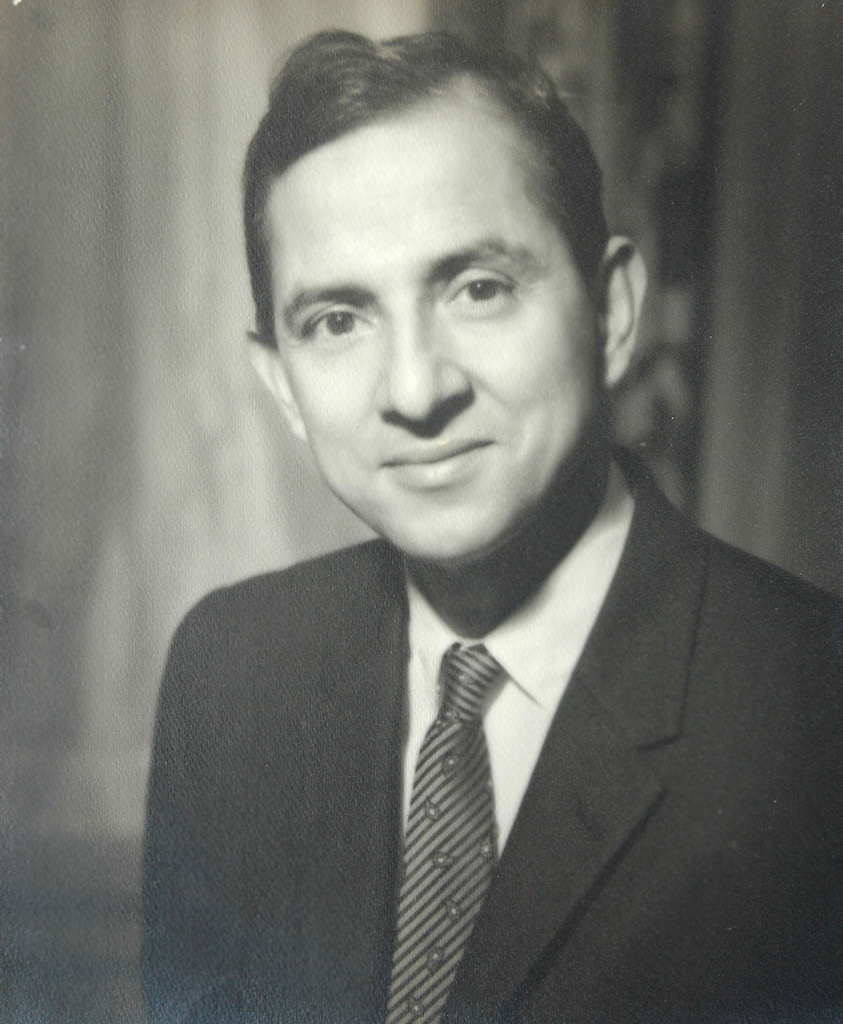

	First party	Second party
Leader	B. P. Koirala	Randhir Subba
Party	Congress	Gorkha Parishad
Leader's seat	No. 32 (Won)	No. 26 (Lost)
Seats won	74	19
Popular vote	666,898	305,118
Percentage	37.2%	17.1%
Prime Minister before election
Subarna Shamsher Rana
Congress
Prime Minister after election
B. P. Koirala
Congress

General elections were held in Nepal from 18 February to 3 April 1959 to elect the 109 members of the first House of Representatives, the lower house of the Parliament of Nepal. They were held under the provisions of the 1959 constitution, which had been adopted on 12 February. More than 4.25 million people out of an overall population of about 8.55 million (1954) were eligible to vote. Voter turnout was 42.18%.

The result was a victory for the Nepali Congress, winning 74 of the 109 seats with 38% of the vote. B. P. Koirala became the first democratically elected and 22nd Prime Minister of Nepal.

== Campaign ==
786 candidates competed for 109 seats in the House of Representatives; 268 ran as independents, with the others representing nine parties. The Nepali Congress contested 108 constituencies, the Gorkha Parishad contested in 86 seats and the Communist Party of Nepal contested 47 seat.

According to former CIA officer Duane Clarridge, U.S. intelligence officials discussed providing limited covert support to B. P. Koirala and the Nepali Congress during the 1959 election in order to "promote political stability and support the development of democratic institutions in Nepal".

== Results ==
Only four parties secured the designation of 'National party' in accordance with the Election Act of Nepal 1959. The party presidents of eight of the nine parties failed to win a seat, with Nepali Congress Bishweshwar Prasad Koirala the only party president to be elected, winning in constituency No. 32 (Morang South Biratnagar West). Nepali Congress leader Subarna Shamsher Rana contested three constituencies (No. 52 (Bara Parsa, Central North), constituency No. 53 (Bara, East Parsa) and constituency No. 91 (Gulmi, South-West)) and won them all. Another Nepal Congress leader Surya Prasad Upadhyaya contested two constituencies (constituency No. 5 (Kathmandu Valley) and constituency No. 14 (Ramechhap, South)) but was defeated in both.

Gorkha Parishad president Randhir Subba was defeated in constituency No. 26 Dhankuta. Tarai Congress president Vedananda Jha lost in constituency No. 39 Siraha. Communist Party of Nepal General Secretary Keshar Jung Rayamajhi was defeated in Palpa Constituency No. 93. Democratic General Assembly president Ranganath Sharma was also defeated in Kathmandu Constituency No. 5. Dilli Raman Regmi of the Nepali National Congress and Bhadrakali Mishra of Nepal Praja Parishad (Mishra) were also defeated. Tanka Prasad Acharya was defeated in from Kathmandu Constituency No. 5.

Party	Votes	%	Seats
Nepali Congress	666,898	37.23	74
Nepal Rashtrabadi Gorkha Parishad	305,118	17.03	19
Samyukta Prajatantra Party	177,408	9.90	5
Communist Party of Nepal	129,142	7.21	4
Prajatantrik Mahasabha	59,896	3.34	0
Nepal Praja Parishad (Mishra)	59,820	3.34	1
Nepal Praja Parishad (Acharya)	53,038	2.96	2
Tarai Congress	36,107	2.02	0
Nepali National Congress	12,707	0.71	0
Independents	291,247	16.26	4
Total	1,791,381	100.00	109
Registered voters/turnout	4,246,468	–	
Source: Nohlen et al

== Aftermath ==
The speaker of the first House of Representatives was Krishna Prasad Bhattarai from Nepali Congress. The term of the parliament started from 27 May 1959 and it was dissolved on 15 December 1960.

== See also ==
- 1st House of Representatives (Nepal)
