= Nepal Rashtrabadi Gorkha Parishad =

Nepal Rashtrabadi Gorkha Parishad नेपाल राष्ट्रवादी गोर्खा परिषद
- President: Bharat Shamsher
- Founded: 1950
- Ideology: Conservatism; Monarchism; Nationalism
- Political position: Right-wing

Election symbol
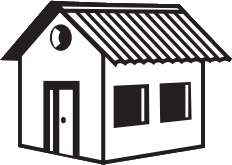

Nepal Rashtrabadi Gorkha Parishad (lit. 'Nationalist Gorkha Council'), a pro-monarchy political party in Nepal. The party was founded in 1951 by members of the erstwhile Rana dynasty. The party was led by Bharat Shamsher JBR and MG Mrigendra Shamsher JBR.

In 1990, a group reorganized a party under the same name.

== History ==
Defense minister Baber Shamsher's son Mrigendra Shamsher and grandson, Bharat Shamsher organized an armed group called the Bir Gorkha Dal in March 1951 with other people close to the Rana family. Ranadhir Subba, a leader of the Akhil Bharatiya Gorkha League was brought in from Darjeeling to front the group.

Congress leaders in the Rana–Congress cabinet characterized the group as a terrorist communal group, but Baber Shamsher did not allow obstruction of the groups activities. On April 11 1951, home minister B. P. Koirala ordered the arrest of several members of the organization including Baber's grandson, Bharat Shamsher, who was general secretary. Members of Gorkha Dal broke Bharat Shamsher out of prison and attacked the residence of B. P. Koirala. The incident was condemned by King Tribhuwan and Gorkha Dal was declared illegal and their leaders and supporters in the army were arrested.

Gorkha Dal was reorganized as Nepal Rashtrabadi Gorkha Parishad in February 1952. Disturbances between supporters and opponents of the Gorkha Parishad in Pokhara in January 1953 led to the arrest of Bharat Shamsher. The party won one seat in the 1953 Kathmandu municipal elections. The party also had one member in the expanded Advisory Assembly of King Tribhuwan formed on 13 April 1954. Leaders of the party and Nepali Congress were arrested in May 1954 for organizing a demonstration against an Indian Parliament good-will mission. The party won 19 seats in the 1959 general elections and was the largest opposition in the House of Representatives.

Shamsher was arrested in the 1960 royal coup, but was released in the fall of 1961 after giving support to the King. He was able to travel abroad, visited the Rome session of the Socialist International and then went to India. In India he denounced the royal regime in Nepal and pledged cooperation with the Nepali Congress to overthrow it. A month later he announced the merger of the party with the Nepali Congress. The Gorkha Parishad leaders in Kathmandu did however condemn this action. The party later disappeared, and its leaders went either to the opposition Nepali Congress or to work in the Panchayat system.

== Electoral performance ==
Election	Votes	%	Seats	Position	Resulting government
1959	305,118	17.1	19 / 109	2nd	In opposition
