= Krishna Prasad Bhattarai =

Nepalese revolutionary, politician, journalist, and novelist (1923–2011)

- कृष्णप्रसाद भट्टराई
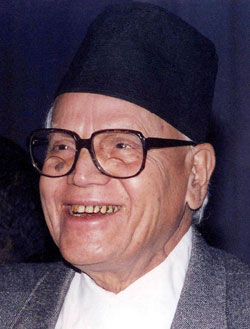
- Bhattarai c. 1990

Prime Minister of Nepal
- In office 31 May 1999 – 22 March 2000
- Monarch: Birendra
- Preceded by: Girija Prasad Koirala
- Succeeded by: Girija Prasad Koirala
- Interim; 19 April 1990 – 26 May 1991
- Monarch: Birendra
- Preceded by: Lokendra Bahadur Chand
- Succeeded by: Girija Prasad Koirala

Member of the House of Representatives
- In office 28 April 2006 – 16 January 2008
- Preceded by: Himself (2002)
- Succeeded by: Karima Begam (as Member of the Constituent Assembly)
- Constituency: Parsa 1
- In office 23 June 1999 – 22 May 2002
- Preceded by: Rajiv Parajuli
- Succeeded by: Himself (2006)
- Constituency: Parsa 1

President of the Nepali Congress
- In office 12 February 1976 – 11 May 1996 (Note: Acting until 17 January 1992)
- Preceded by: B. P. Koirala
- Succeeded by: Girija Prasad Koirala

1st Speaker of the House of Representatives
- In office 3 July 1959 – 15 December 1960
- Monarch: Birendra
- Deputy: Mahendra Narayan Nidhi
- Preceded by: Office established
- Succeeded by: Daman Nath Dhungana (1991)

Personal details
- Born: 22 December 1924 Varanasi, British Raj
- Died: 4 March 2011 (aged 86) Lalitpur, Nepal
- Party: Nepali Congress
- Parents: Sankata Prasad Bhattarai (fatherr); Lalita Devi Bhattarai (mother)
- Education: Banaras Hindu University (BA)
- Occupation: Politician; journalist; writer
- Awards: Nepal Ratna
- Nicknames: Santa neta; Kishunji

Military service
- Allegiance: Nepali Congress
- Branch/service: Congress Liberation Army (Mukti Sena)
- Rank: Commander
- Battles/wars: 1950–1951 Nepalese revolution

Krishna Prasad Bhattarai (13 December 1924 – 4 March 2011), popularly known as Kishunji, was a Nepalese revolutionary, statesman, politician, journalist, writer, and one of the founding leaders of the Nepali Congress. He was one of the main leaders involved in transitioning Nepal from an absolute monarchy to democracy.

Bhattarai became the Prime Minister of Nepal in April 1990 after a popular democratic movement referred to as the Jana Andolan.

Bhattarai twice served as the Prime Minister of Nepal, once heading the interim government from 19 April 1990 to 26 May 1991, and then as elected Prime Minister from 31 May 1999 to 22 March 2000.

Bhattarai was the officiating President of the Nepali Congress for over 20 years, from 12 February 1976 to 11 May 1996, and was officially elected to the post of president of the party on 17 January 1992. He participated in the democratic movement of Nepal from its inception. The Constitution of Nepal (1990) was promulgated while he was interim Prime Minister and he was credited with successfully holding the parliamentary election in 1990, a milestone in Nepalese political history.

== Early life ==
Bhattarai was the youngest son of father Sankata Prasad Bhattarai and mother Lalita Devi Bhattarai. He was born on 22 December 1924, on Krishna Ekadashi, in Varanasi, Benares Estate of the British Raj. He belonged to the Khas Brahmin community and the Vasishtha gotra. Educated in Varanasi, he developed a strong interest in sports.

His great-grandfather, Gajadhar Bhattarai, served as a courtier of the Shah dynasty and accompanied King Prithvi Narayan Shah during the unification of Nepal. Following the conquest of kathmandu valley in 1768, he left his ancestral home in Liglig, located in Gorkha, and settled in Paknajol, Kathmandu.

Following the rise of Jung Bahadur Rana, Gadjadhar Bhattarai was exiled to Varanasi for opposing the Rana regime accompanying the exiled Queen Rajya Lakshmi Devi with his 12-year-old son, Biswanath Bhattarai. Biswanath's son was Sankata Prasad Bhattarai, who was born in Varanasi and later became involved in anti-Rana activities. He and his wife had six daughters and four sons, the youngest of whom was Krishna Prasad Bhattarai. Growing up in a family with a long history of service to the kingdom and resistance to the Rana regime, he was exposed to politics from an early age.

== Early career ==
In his youth, Bhattarai was a journalist. He was also one of the few foreign journalists to interview the General Secretary Nikita Khrushchev of the Communist Party of the Soviet Union.

== First democratic movement of Nepal ==
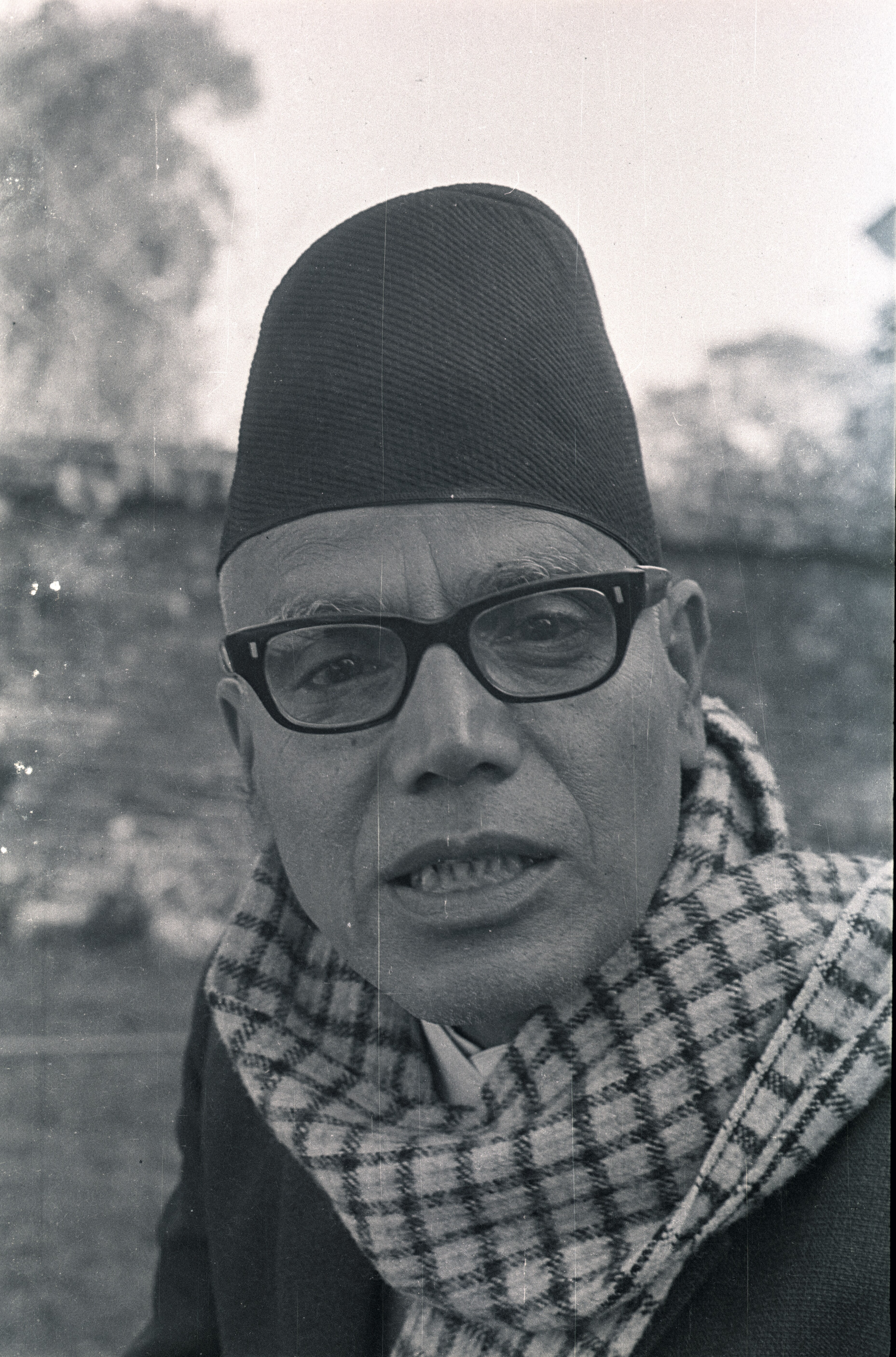
Bhattarai in 1977

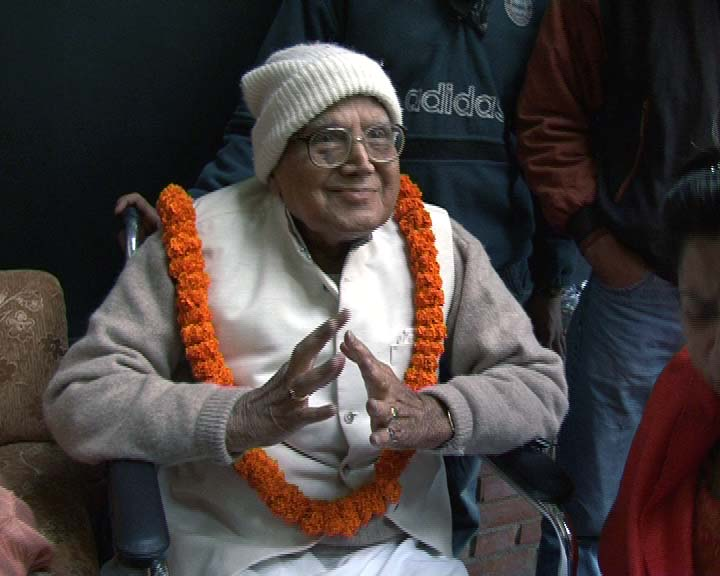
Kishunji

Bhattarai had participated in a long struggle to modernize the Nepalese political system, aiming to transform a society that was isolated for centuries from the outside world.

He started politics to end the 104-year-rule of the Rana Dynasty. During the political movement of 1950 to overthrow the Rana autocracy, initiated by the Bairgania Conference of the Nepali Congress on 26–27 September 1950 (Ashvin 10–11, 2007 BS), he was in charge of armed group Congress Mukti Sena fighting in Gorkha district. This armed struggle was initiated by the Nepali Congress, of which he was founding member. The armed revolution by the Nepali Congress was supported by King Tribhuvan, who was in exile, and by Indian and Burmese socialists. The armed revolution ultimately brought an end to the 104-year-rule of the Rana Dynasty on 18 February 1951 (Falgun 7, 2007 BS). This day is celebrated as Democracy Day and is a public holiday in Nepal.

After the first parliamentary election of 1959, at the age of 36, he became Speaker of lower house of parliament, though he was not an elected member. After the coup of 1960, Bhattarai was held without trial for eight years at the Sundarijal Military Detention Camp.

Bhattarai was nominated as the officiating President of the Nepali Congress on 12 February 1976 (Falgun 1, 2025 BS) by then party President B. P. Koirala. He held this post for over 20 years, during which time he was a key figure in Nepal's democratic movement. He was elected President of the Nepali Congress by the Eighth National Conference of the Nepali Congress, held in January 1992 (Falgun 2049 B S).

== Prime Minister of Nepal ==
=== Interim Prime Minister (1990–1991) ===
Bhattarai was the Prime Minister of the Interim Government after the 1990 Nepalese revolution which brought democracy to the country, bringing an end to the 30-year-old Panchayati government, and to absolute monarchy in Nepal.

Bhattarai transformed the country from an absolute monarchy to a multi-party democracy without any major problems. He was prime minister when the 1990 constitution of Nepal was promulgated and successfully held the first multi-party election in 30 years. He was a popular leader but lost the election by a very narrow margin.

=== Prime Minister (1999–2000) ===
He again served as Prime Minister of Nepal from 31 May 1999 to 22 March 2000. He also held the portfolio of foreign ministry from 1990 to 1991 and briefly during 1999 while he was prime minister.

== Personal life ==
Bhattarai was affectionately known as Kishunji, he was widely respected with his simple lifestyle and firm principles, earning the title Sānta nētā ("saintly leader") from the public.

He remained unmarried throughout his life, had no children or bank account, lived in a government-provided ashram and adopted a ascetic lifestyle.

== Party politics ==
Until recently, both factions of the Nepali Congress, the main Nepali Congress led by Girija Prasad Koirala and the Nepali Congress (Democratic) led by Sher Bahadur Deuba claimed Bhattarai on their side, although his sympathies were closer to Sher Bahadur Deuba from the beginning. Both congress parties elected him as Maha Samiti Member (General Convention Member) from Lalitpur District. On 26 September 2007, Bhattarai announced that he broke relations with the Nepali Congress; the day after the two factions had reunited. Bhattarai's decision was motivated by the move towards republicanism by the unified Nepali Congress.

== Death ==
Bhattarai passed away at Norvic International Hospital on 4 March 2011. He was the last surviving founding leader of Nepali Congress. The hospital reported that he died at 11:26 pm. Bhattarai had been in the critical care unit for three weeks. He was suffering from chronic bronchitis, chronic renal failure, and congestive heart failure.

== Honors ==
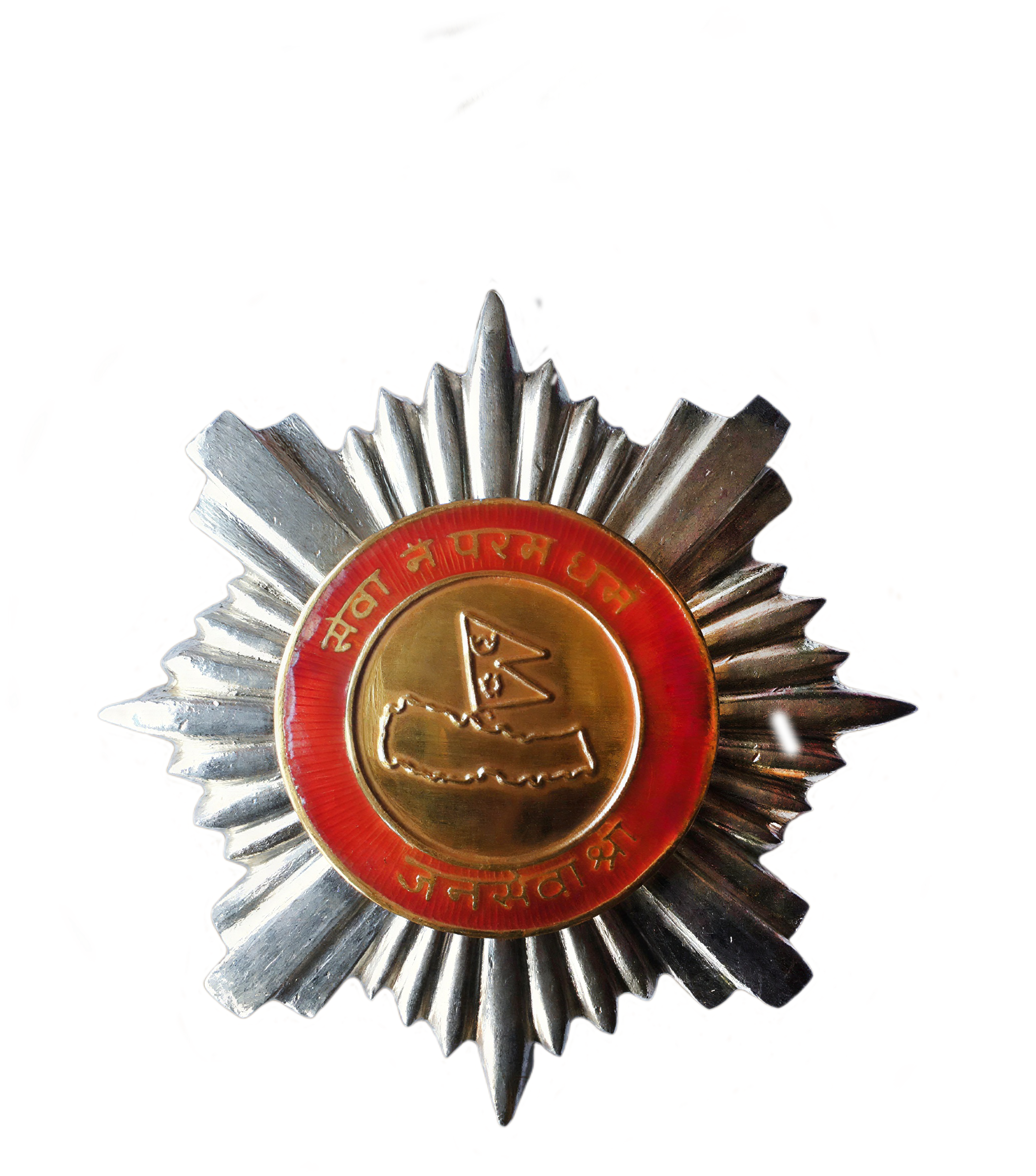
- Nepal Ratna Man Padavi (2021) Posthumously awarded to Krishna Prasad Bhattarai by the then President of Nepal, Bidya Devi Bhandari.

== See also ==
- 1990 Nepalese Revolution – A democratic movement that ended the absolute monarchy and restored multi-party democracy in Nepal, also known as the 1990 People's Movement.
- Bhattarai Interim Cabinet (1990–1991) – The executive government of Nepal led by Krishna Prasad Bhattarai following the 1990 Nepalese Revolution.
- 1991 Nepalese General Election – The first multi-party election in Nepal since 1959, held following the restoration of democracy after the 1990 Nepalese Revolution.
- 1999 Nepalese General Election – A parliamentary election in which Krishna Prasad Bhattarai won representing the Nepali Congress and became Prime Minister of Nepal.

== Notes ==
Political offices
Preceded by Lokendra Bahadur Chand	Prime Minister of Nepal; 1990–1991	Succeeded by Girija Prasad Koirala
Preceded by Girija Prasad Koirala	Prime Minister of Nepal; 1999–2000	Succeeded by Girija Prasad Koirala
