= 2nd Rastriya Panchayat =

| ← | 1st Panchayat | 3rd Panchayat | → |
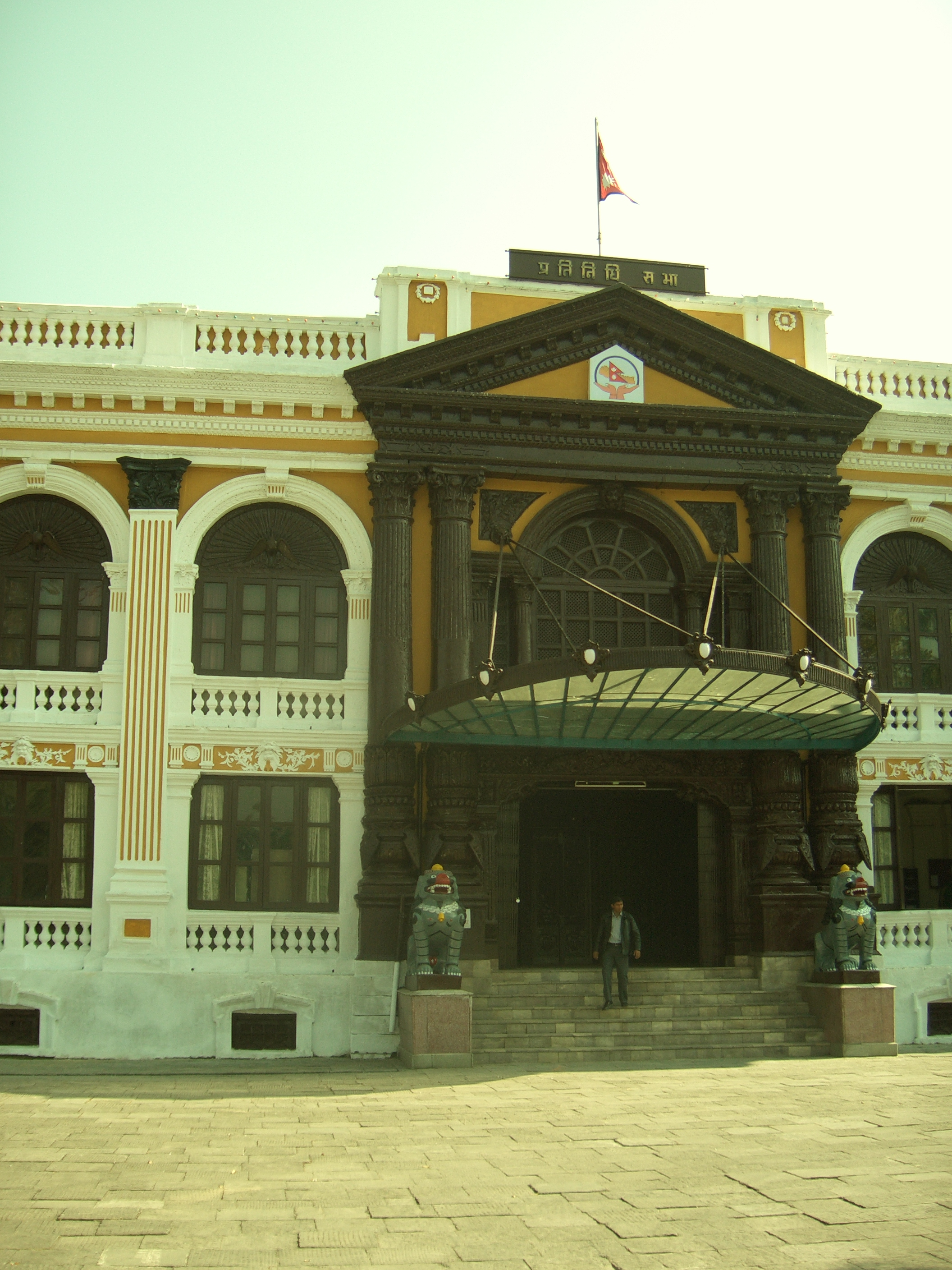
- Gallery Baithak

Overview
- Legislative body: Rastriya Panchayat
- Jurisdiction: Kingdom of Nepal
- Meeting place: Gallery Baithak
- Term: 11 June 1981 – 1986
- Election: 1981 general election

Rastriya Panchayat
- Members: 140
- Chairman: Marich Man Singh Shrestha; Tulsi Giri
- Deputy Chairman: Gopal Chandra Singh Rajbanshi
- Prime Minister: Surya Bahadur Thapa; Lokendra Bahadur Chand; Nagendra Prasad Rijal

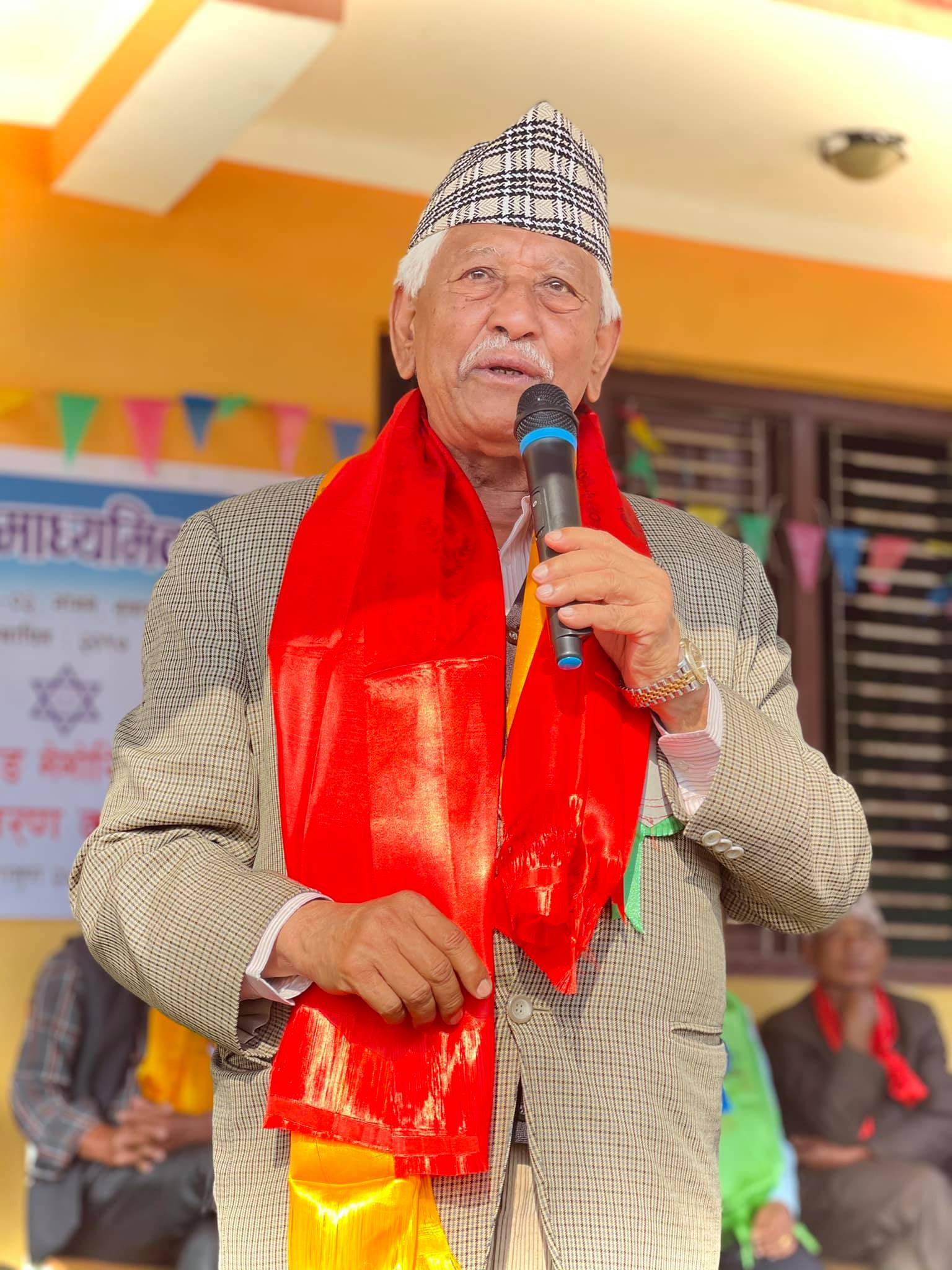
Former Minister and Senior Congress Leader Arjun Narsingh KC was voted in as the youngest parliamentarian amongst fanfare among youth voters

The 2nd Rastriya Panchayat was elected in the 1981 Nepalese general election.

The list of members is arranged by district for elected members and zones for nominated members. Marich Man Singh Shrestha and Tulsi Giri served as chairmen; while Surya Bahadur Thapa, Lokendra Bahadur Chand and Nagendra Prasad Rijal served as prime ministers during the term of the panchayat.

== Members of the Rastriya Panchayat ==
| District | Member |
|---|---|
| Taplejung | Bishnu Maden |
| Panchthar | Padma Sundar Lawati |
| Ilam | Som Nath Bastola |
| Ilam | Bhagwati Das Shrestha |
| Jhapa | Gopal Chandra Singh Rajbanshi |
| Jhapa | Puhatu Chaudhary |
| Sankhuwasabha | Gairi Man Rai |
| Tehrathum | Tulsi Subba |
| Bhojpur | Dhyan Bahadur Rai |
| Bhojpur | Mukunda Bahadur Basnet |
| Dhankuta | Surya Bahadur Thapa |
| Morang | Badri Prasad Mandal |
| Morang | Karna Bahadur Dhimal |
| Sunsari | Dil Bahadur Shrestha |
| Sunsari | Shyam Prasad Gupta |
| Udayapur | Chakra Bahadur Basnet |
| Solukhumbu | Tshering Tenzin Lama |
| Okhaldhunga | Bholaman Singh Thapa |
| Saptari | Indra Dev Prasad Yadav |
| Saptari | Chandra Narayan Chaudhary |
| Khotang | Parshuram Rai |
| Khotang | Kedar Rai |
| Siraha | Dr. Dambar Narayan Yadav |
| Siraha | Krishna Charan Shrestha |
| Sindhuli | Bhadra Kumari Ghale |
| Dolakha | Krishna Prasad Upreti |
| Ramechhap | Navaraj Subedi |
| Ramechhap | Tilak Bahadur Khatri |
| Dhanusha | Hem Bahadur Malla |
| Dhanusha | Dev Narayan Yadav |
| Sarlahi | Ram Chandra Ray |
| Sarlahi | Ram Dhyan Ray |
| Mahottari | Sharat Singh Bhandari |
| Mahottari | Islam Ansari |
| Makwanpur | Til Bahadur Negi |
| Makwanpur | Rupendra Chandra Bista |
| Chitwan | Guna Raj Pathak |
| Chitwan | Santa Kumar Chaudhary |
| Bara | Bhagwat Prasad Yadav |
| Bara | Ramnanda Prasad Yadav |
| Parsa | Chandra Dev Chaudhary |
| Parsa | Mohan Lal Chaudhary |
| Rautahat | Drona Shamsher JBR |
| Rautahat | Sheikh Sarajul |
| Sindhupalchok | Pashupati Shamsher JBR |
| Sindhupalchok | Netra Bikram Thapa |
| Kavrepalanchok | Satya Man Lama |
| Kavrepalanchok | Govinda Nath Upreti |
| Bhaktapur | Karna Prasad Heju |
| Lalitpur | Keshar Bahadur Bista |
| Kathmandu | Nani Maiya Dahal |
| Kathmandu | Jog Mehar Shrestha |
| Nuwakot | Arjun Narsingh K.C. |
| Nuwakot | Dr. Prakash Chandra Lohani |
| Rasuwa | Layul Tamang |
| Dhading | Hari Bahadur Thapa Chhetri |
| Dhading | Budhhiman Tamang |
| Gorkha | Narayan Malla |
| Gorkha | Yadu Prasad Bhatta |
| Lamjung | Dambar Jang Gurung |
| Tanahun | Shribhadra Sharma Khanal |
| Tanahun | Nar Bahadur Gurung |
| Kaski | Radhe Shyam Kamaro |
| Kaski | Ganesh Sherchan |
| Syangja | Pitambar Thapa |
| Syangja | Shobha Kanta Upadhyaya |
| Manang | Pema Tshering Gurung |
| Gulmi | Baikuntha Bahadur Chand |
| Gulmi | Shri Prasad Budhathoki |
| Arghakhanchi | Kashi Nath Gautam |
| Rupandehi | Triveni Kurmi |
| Rupandehi | Deepak Bohara |
| Nawalparasi | Triyugi Narayan Chaudhary |
| Nawalparasi | Man Bahadur Pradhan |
| Palpa | Hari Bahadur Thapa |
| Palpa | Yadav Singh Raymajhi |
| Kapilvastu | Raghavendra Pratap Shah |
| Kapilvastu | Bhagwan Das Gupta |
| Mustang | Nar Bahadur Harichan |
| Parbat | Dambar Bahadur Malla |
| Baglung | Tejendra Bahadur Khadka |
| Baglung | Tejav Gauchan |
| Myagdi | Bhim Prasad Gauchan |
| Salyan | Marich Man Singh Shrestha |
| Pyuthan | Tanka Bahadur Bista |
| Rukum | Gopalji Jang Shah |
| Rolpa | Balaram Gharti Magar |
| Rolpa | Reg Bahadur Subedi |
| Dang | Rana Bahadur Shah |
| Dang | Ek Raj Sharma |
| Surkhet | Chandra Bahadur Budha |
| Dailekh | Keshav Bahadur Shah |
| Dailekh | Karna Bahadur Singh |
| Bardiya | Daman Dhoj Chand |
| Jajarkot | Deep Bahadur Singh |
| Banke | Fateh Singh Tharu |
| Humla | Surbir Shahi |
| Jumla | Harish Chandra Mahat |
| Dolpa | Moti Prasad Pahadi |
| Kalikot | Dharma Dutt Upadhyaya |
| Mugu | Tej Bahadur Bham |
| Bajhang | Gagan Jang Bahadur Singh |
| Kailali | Mohan Raj Malla |
| Achham | Naina Bahadur Swar |
| Achham | Devendra Bahadur Shah |
| Doti | Narayan Dutt Bhatta |
| Bajura | Nar Singh Giri |
| Darchula | Kaman Bahadur Pal |
| Baitadi | Lokendra Bahadur Chand |
| Baitadi | Ganesh Dutta Lekhak |
| Dadeldhura | Lal Bahadur Kadayat |
| Kanchanpur | Lawaru Rana Tharu |

== List of nominated members ==
| Zone | Member |
|---|---|
| Mechi | Saraswati Rai |
| Koshi | Hira Lal Bishwakarma |
| Koshi | Bharat Dhoj Ibahang |
| Sagarmatha | Aang Bang Sherpa |
| Sagarmatha | Kunja Bihari Prasad Singh |
| Janakpur | Rudra Prasad Giri |
| Janakpur | Bhola Nath Jha |
| Bagmati | Kamal Shah |
| Bagmati | Shridhar Shamsher JBR |
| Bagmati | Ranadhir Subba |
| Bagmati | Upendra Daiwagya |
| Bagmati | Ram Shankar Shrestha |
| Bagmati | Padam Bahadur Khatri |
| Bagmati | Prem Bahadur Bista |
| Bagmati | Ramesh Nath Pandey |
| Narayani | Lila Raj Bista |
| Gandaki | Baidhya Devi Devkota |
| Dhaulagiri | Lal Singh Gurung |
| Lumbini | Dr. Yadav Pratap Pant |
| Karnali | Chhabi Lal Lama Tamang |
| Rapti | Bam Kumari Budha Magar |
| Rapti | Dev Bahadur K.C. |
| Rapti | Parshu Narayan Chaudhary |
| Bheri | Mohammad Iqbal Iraqi |
| Seti | Janak Bahadur Shah |
| Mahakali | Kalpana Bista |

== By-election ==
| District | Incumbent | Elected | Date |
|---|---|---|---|
| Bardiya | Tirtha Bahadur Sapkota | Daman Dhoj Chand | 1982 |
| Rupandehi | Kunwar Inderjit Singh | Triveni Kurmi | 1982 |
| Chitwan | Bakhan Singh Gurung | Guna Raj Pathak | 1984 |
| Sankhuwasabha | Govinda Man Singh Adhikari | Gairi Man Rai | 1985 |
| Saptari | | Devendra Jha | 1985 |
