= 3rd Rastriya Panchayat =

←	2nd Panchayat	2nd HoR	→
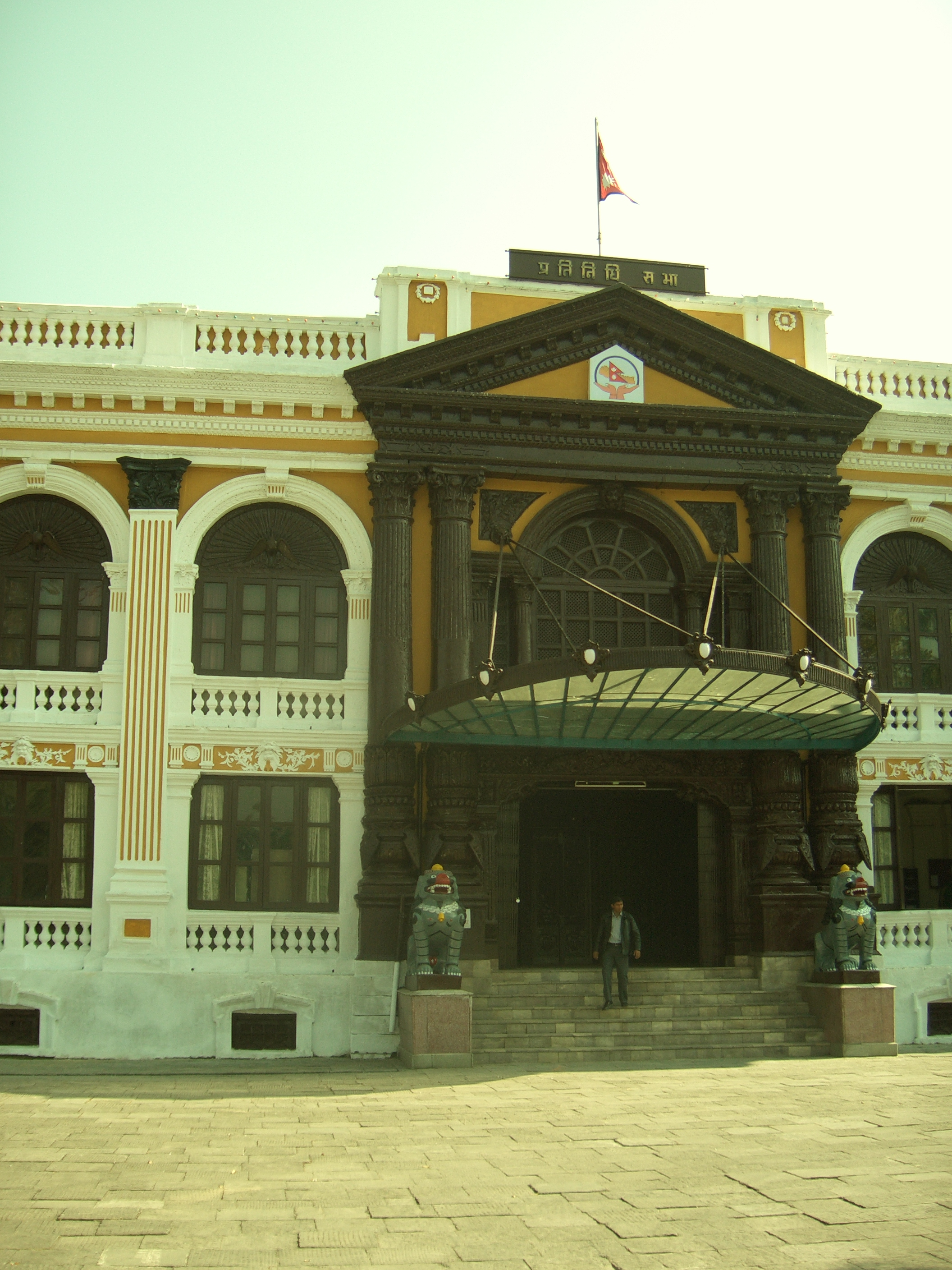
- Gallery Baithak

Overview
- Legislative body: Rastriya Panchayat
- Jurisdiction: Kingdom of Nepal
- Meeting place: Gallery Baithak
- Term: 1986 – 1990
- Election: 1986 general election

Rastriya Panchayat
- Members: 140
- Chairman: Nava Raj Subedi
- Deputy Chairman: Parshuram Rai
- Prime Minister: Marich Man Singh Shrestha; Lokendra Bahadur Chand

The 3rd Rastriya Panchayat was elected in the 1986 Nepalese general election.

The list of members is arranged by district for elected members and by zones for nominated members. Navaraj Subedi served as chairman, and Marich Man Singh Shrestha and Lokendra Bahadur Chand served as prime ministers during the term of the panchayat.

== Members of the Rastriya Panchayat ==
District	Member
Taplejung	Bijay Prakash Thebe
Panchthar	Padma Sundar Lawati
Ilam	Benup Raj Prasai
Ilam	Nobal Kemi Rai
Jhapa	Keshav Kumar Budhathoki
Jhapa	Drona Prasad Acharya
Sankhuwasabha	Dharma Bahadur Gurung
Tehrathum	Parshuram Khapung
Bhojpur	Tanka Dhakal
Bhojpur	Mukunda Bahadur Basnet
Dhankuta	Surya Bahadur Thapa
Morang	Badri Prasad Mandal
Morang	Umesh Jang Thapa
Sunsari	Dil Bahadur Shrestha
Sunsari	Krishna Kumar Rai
Udayapur	Hari Bahadur Basnet
Solukhumbu	Bhupal Kirati
Okhaldhunga	Champak Sunuwar
Saptari	Gajendra Narayan Singh
Saptari	Mrigendra Kumar Singh Yadav
Khotang	Birendra Keshari Pokharel
Khotang	Parshuram Rai
Siraha	Bishweshwar Prasad Marwaita
Siraha	Krishna Charan Shrestha
Sindhuli	Tanka Jang Thapa
Dolakha	Krishna Prasad Upreti
Ramechhap	Navaraj Subedi
Ramechhap	Ang Tshering Lama
Dhanusha	Hem Bahadur Malla
Dhanusha	Sharada Malla
Sarlahi	Ram Chandra Ray
Sarlahi	Laxmi Singh
Mahottari	Sharat Singh Bhandari
Mahottari	Bishweshwar Yadav
Makwanpur	Kamal Thapa
Makwanpur	Rup Chandra Bista
Chitwan	Jagrit Prasad Bhetwal
Chitwan	Bhim Bahadur Shrestha
Bara	Chanda Shah
Bara	Bishwanath Prasad Jaiswal
Parsa	Chandra Dev Prasad Chaudhary
Parsa	Jay Prakash
Rautahat	Gunjeshwari Prasad Singh
Rautahat	Drona Shamsher JBR
Sindhupalchok	Pashupati Shamsher JBR
Sindhupalchok	Netra Bikram Thapa
Kavrepalanchok	Satya Man Lama
Kavrepalanchok	Shailendra Upadhyaya
Bhaktapur	Govinda Dulal
Lalitpur	Keshar Bahadur Bista
Kathmandu	Padma Ratna Tuladhar
Kathmandu	Bimal Man Singh Shrestha
Nuwakot	Jit Singh Khadka
Nuwakot	Dr. Prakash Chandra Lohani
Rasuwa	Ram Krishna Upadhayay Acharya
Dhading	Yogendra Singh Thapa
Dhading	Budhhiman Tamang
Gorkha	Rajeshwar Devkota
Gorkha	Birendra Kumar Pokharel
Lamjung	Lekh Nath Adhikari
Tanahun	Chhetra Pratap Adhikari
Tanahun	Nar Bahadur Gurung
Kaski	Somnath Adhikari Pyasi
Kaski	Uttam Bahadur Pun
Syangja	Pitambar Thapa
Syangja	Bal Bikram Thapa
Manang	Pema Tshering Gurung
Gulmi	Baikuntha Bahadur Chand
Gulmi	Shri Prasad Budhathoki
Arghakhanchi	Ram Bahadur B.C.
Rupandehi	Niranjan Thapa
Rupandehi	Deepak Bohora
Nawalparasi	Dr. Yadav Prasad Pant
Nawalparasi	Rabindra Nath Sharma
Palpa	Hari Bahadur Thapa
Palpa	Gambhir Jang Karki
Kapilvastu	Hari Narayan Rajairiya
Kapilvastu	Bhagwan Das Gupta
Mustang	Rudra Prasad Sherchan
Parbat	Chhetra Bahadur Gurung
Baglung	Omkar Prasad Gauchan
Baglung	Kul Raj Sharma
Myagdi	Bhim Prasad Gauchan
Salyan	Marich Man Singh Shrestha
Pyuthan	Khem Raj Pandit
Rukum	Dhruba Bikram Shah
Rolpa	Balaram Gharti Magar
Rolpa	Reg Bahadur Subedi
Dang	Parshu Narayan Chaudhary
Dang	Yagya Bahadur Budhathoki
Surkhet	Chandra Bahadur Budha
Dailekh	Dr. Prem Bahadur Shahi
Dailekh	Gagan Bahadur Shahi
Bardiya	Padam Bahadur Sapkota
Jajarkot	Tej Bikram Shah
Banke	Fateh Singh Tharu
Humla	Chakra Bahadur Shahi
Jumla	Chandra Bahadur Thapa
Dolpa	Nar Bahadur Budhathoki
Kalikot	Dharma Dutt Upadhyaya
Mugu	Krishna Bahadur Malla
Bajhang	Gagan Jang Bahadur Singh
Kailali	Mohan Raj Malla
Achham	Janak Bahadur Shah
Achham	Bijay Bahadur Kunwar
Doti	Lal Bahadur Khadka
Bajura	Prakash Bahadur Singh
Darchula	Indra Bahadur Bam
Baitadi	Lokendra Bahadur Chand
Baitadi	Dambar Bahadur Bam
Dadeldhura	Ganesh Prasad Bhatta
Kanchanpur	Indra Bahadur Khatri

== List of nominated members ==
Zone	Member
Mechi	Dirgha Raj Prasai
Koshi	Ritu Barna Tumbahamphe
Koshi	Kalpana Neupane
Koshi	Nagendra Prasad Rijal
Koshi	D.P. Adhikari
Sagarmatha	Uma Kanta Sinha
Janakpur	Makeshwar Prasad Singh
Bagmati	Dr. Mohammad Mohsin
Bagmati	Ramesh Nath Pandey
Bagmati	Prem Bahadur Shakya
Bagmati	Sushila Thapa
Bagmati	Krishna Raj Aryal
Bagmati	Bharat Bahadur Pradhan
Narayani	Lila Raj Bista
Gandaki	Lakshya Bahadur Gurung
Dhaulagiri	Tek Bahadur Bishwakarma
Lumbini	Khadgajeet Baral
Lumbini	Sita Devi Garga
Rapti	Bharat Mani Sharma
Bheri	Ghanashyam Giri
Bheri	Indira Aktreya
Seti	Shiva Raj Pant
Mahakali	Bhajan Lal Rana Tharu
Mahakali	Kalawati Singh

== By-election or changes ==
District	Incumbent	Elected	Date
Tanahun		Shribhadra Sharma	1987
Arghakhanchi	Kashi Nath Gautam	Ram Bahadur B.C.	1987
Nominated, Karnali	Rudra Bahadur Dangi		
