= 1981 Nepalese general election =

- 9 May 1981

112 of the 140 seats in the Rastriya Panchayat 57 seats needed for a majority
- Turnout: 52.2%

General elections were held in Nepal on 9 May 1981 to elect members of the Rastriya Panchayat. 80% of the seats were elected through adult universal suffrage; this was the first election through universal suffrage held in Nepal in 22 years. However, political parties were banned at the time, and the main underground opposition forces (the Nepali Congress and various communist groups) called for a boycott of the election.

== Background ==
In 1980, a referendum to continue the Panchayat system was held and approved. In December, an amendment to the constitution was passed by King Birendra creating direct elections and allowing for the election of the prime minister.

The election were the first to be held after the constitutional amendment. In total there were 112 elected seats, whilst 28 were appointed by the King. According to official reports, 63% of the eligible voters took part in the polls. However, there were some inconsistencies in the report of voting numbers. Voter turnout was 52.2%. There were 7,793,119 eligible voters for this election.

== Constituencies ==
40 out of the 75 districts of Nepal formed two-member constituencies whilst the less populated 35 districts formed single-member constituencies. The 15 mountain districts were all single-member constituencies. The hill districts elected 57 seats, the inner-terai districts eight seats and the terai districts 32 seats.

== Campaign ==
Initially there were 1,451 total candidates, of whom 353 later withdrew. The 122 seats in the Rastriya Panchayat were contested by 1,096 candidates. Virtually all candidates campaigned on slogans such as "God and Motherhood", portraying themselves as opponents of corruption and inflation. With the absence of organized political parties in the election, the campaign was rather low-key. Mass rallies were not held, not even in Kathmandu. Most candidates relied heavily on door-to-door campaigning and canvassing through family, caste and ethnic networks. Candidates also used posters and vehicles with loudspeakers. The spending ceiling of each candidate was fixed at 30,000 Nepalese rupees.

70 of the candidates in the election had also contested the 1959 election. Of those candidates 29 ran as independents, 18 for the Nepali Congress, 8 for the Samyukta Prajatantra Party, 6 for the Nepal Rashtrabadi Gorkha Parishad, 6 for the Praja Parishad, and 1 for the Tarai Congress. 17 of these 70 candidates won in the 1981 election.

Candidates had to pay a security deposit of 1,500 Nepalese rupees in order to contest the election.

== Results ==
| Party | Votes | % | Seats |
|---|---|---|---|
| Independents | 3,855,525 | 100.00 | 112 |
| Appointees | | | 28 |
| Total | 3,855,525 | 100.00 | 140 |
| Valid votes | 3,855,525 | 94.53 | |
| Invalid/blank votes | 223,118 | 5.47 | |
| Total votes | 4,078,643 | 100.00 | |
| Registered voters/turnout | 7,811,448 | 52.21 | |
Source: Nohlen et al., IPU

The incumbent prime minister, Surya Bahadur Thapa, contested and was elected from the Dhankuta district. He got 40,546 votes in total. Two pre-panchayat prime ministers contested the election, Matrika Prasad Koirala and Dr. K.I. Singh. Matrika Prasad Koirala contested in the Morang district. He was supported, unofficially, by Surya Bahadur Thapa. Koirala did however lose the election, whilst K.I. Singh was elected.

Overall, the result was a setback for the ruling elite. Although all candidates were officially independents, various candidates were well known as having the backing of the government. In total about 70% of the "official" candidates lost their seats. In the elected Rastriya Panchayat, there were 57 newcomers to the assembly.

The defeats of the government endorsed side was partially due to divisions inside the government endorsed camp. In Morang district the royal house and the prime minister supported opposing candidates, eventually resulting in the defeat for both.

The candidate who received the highest number of votes was Hem Bahadur Malla, a cabinet minister. Malla got 76,720 votes. The elected member with the lowest number of votes was Tej Bahadur Bham, who got 3,137 votes. independent supporters of reintroducing parliamentary democracy who were elected were Arjun Narsingh K.C., Prakash Chandra Lohani and Shribhadra Sharma.

Whilst the Nepali Congress leadership had called for boycott, the dissident fraction led by Bakhan Singh Gurung had launched 36 candidates. Four of them were elected; Dr. K.I. Singh, Bakhan Singh Gurung, Kashi Nath Gautam and Bhagwat Yadav. The pro-Soviet Communist Party led by Keshar Jung Rayamajhi had launched over 45-50 candidates, but none got elected.

Some independent leftwing candidates were elected, such as Govinda Nath Upreti (Kavre), Rup Chandra Bista (Makwanpur) and Karna Bahadur Hyuju (Bhaktapur).

The Chhetri were the largest ethnic group in the Rastriya Panchayat with 41 members elected. Twenty-eight women candidates contested the election, out of whom two were elected; Nani Mainya Dahal and Bhadra Kumari Ghale. Dahal, a relatively unknown person in Nepalese politics at the time, swept the Kathmandu district polls. Her election was seen as a mistrust vote against the establishment.

== See also ==
- 2nd Rastriya Panchayat

== Works cited ==
- Upreti, B., ed. (1991). Nation-Building in South Asia. Vol. 2. University of Rajasthan. ISBN 81-7003-130-3.
