= Bishwa Bandhu Thapa =

Nepalese politician (1927–2026)

- विश्वबन्धु थापा

1st Chairman of the Rastriya Panchayat
- In office 19 April 1963 – 5 July 1964
- Monarch: Mahendra
- Preceded by: Position established
- Succeeded by: Rajeshwor Devkota

Member of Parliament, Pratinidhi Sabha
- In office 30 June 1959 – 15 December 1960
- Preceded by: Constituency created
- Succeeded by: Constituency abolished
- Constituency: Chitaun Chisapani

Personal details
- Born: 9 September 1927 Saharsa, Bihar and Orissa Province, British India
- Died: 14 February 2026 (aged 98) Kathmandu, Nepal
- Party: Rastriya Prajatantra Party (1990–2013; since 2017)
- Other political affiliations: National Congress (1946–50); Congress (1950–60; 1981–82); RPP Nepal (2013–2017)
- Spouse: Josana Thapa
- Parent: Padma Jung Thapa (father)

Bishwa Bandhu Thapa (Nepali: विश्वबन्धु थापा; 9 September 1927 – 14 February 2026) was a Nepalese politician who was regarded as a key figure in the early days of the Panchayat system. Thapa, who was seen as one of the architects of the Panchayat system, served as the first chairman of the Rastriya Panchayat from 1963 to 1964.

== Early life ==
Thapa was born on 9 September 1927 in Saharsa, India, to Padma Jung Thapa who had been a Subba in the Rana administration. His mother died at childbirth. His family was under exile from their ancestral home of Gorkha on orders from Chandra Shumsher. After being pardoned by Juddha Shumsher, his family settled in Biratnagar when Thapa was six.

== Nepali Congress (1946–1959) ==
He was a student at Kashi Hindu Vishwavidyalaya in Benaras along with Man Mohan Adhikari, B. P. Koirala and K. P. Bhattarai. He was a founding member of the Nepali National Congress in 1946. He was arrested for distributing party pamphlets during the Biratnagar jute mill strike the following year.

In November 1951, the Mukti Sena under Thapa and Keshav Koirala tried to take over Jhapa but failed. The next month they launched a successful campaign to take over Rangeli and Biratnagar. He was made home minister of the people's government in Biratnagar. When Koirala was appointed home minister after the 1951 revolution, he appointed Thapa as the Badahakim for Gorkha and later for Pokhara when Matrika Prasad Koirala was prime minister. He was nominated as a central committee member of Nepali Congress in 1951. At the party's sixth general convention in 1956 at Birgunj, he was appointed general secretary of the party. He was re-appointed general secretary at a special general convention the following year in Biratnagar. At the party's seventh general convention at Kathmandu in 1960, Thapa was elected as a member of the central working committee of the party.

Thapa was elected as a member of the 1st House of Representatives from Chitaun– Chisapani at the 1959 elections. He also served as the chief whip for Nepali Congress during the term of the parliament.

== Panchayat (1960–1990) ==
Thapa was in New York for the United Nations General Assembly during the 1960 coup d'état by King Mahendra. He was arrested after landing in Kathmandu, but was taken to his residence. He met with Tulsi Giri and three days later had an audience with the king where he was asked to support the move. He came out in support of the move and planned the Panchayat system along with Tulsi Giri. On the insistence of Giri and Thapa all political parties were banned instead of the proposed ban on only Nepali Congress. He and Tulsi Giri developed the political philosophy of the Panchayat system, along with formulating its plans and policies.

Thapa was made home minister and minister for national guidance in the cabinet under the direct rule of King Mahendra. In April 1963, he was appointed the chairman of the Rastriya Panchayat. He also headed the Commission for Administrative Power Decentralization that was formed in May 1963 which recommended the formation of panchayats at the village and district level.

On 5 July 1964 then King Mahendra appointed Thapa, the chair of the National Panchayat, as the first deputy chairman of the cabinet under Tulsi Giri but later resigned on 21 August 1964. He resigned from the Rastriya Panchayat in July 1966. In 1967, Thapa was arrested for planning to issue a statement against the postponement of the Graduate's Organization elections. He was appointed the chairman of the central committee of the Back to the Village national campaign in 1969.

He lost the village panchayat elections in Bhandara, Chitwan, but was later re-appointed the chair of the Back to the Village campaign by King Birendra. He resigned from his position in 1978 after being criticized for celebrating Dashain with B. P. Koirala. He campaigned in support of the multiparty side in the 1980 referendum on government reform. He rejoined Nepali Congress in 1981, but left the party after Koirala's death in 1982. He was elected as the president of the Graduate's Organization in the panchayat elections.

== Rastriya Prajatantra Party (1991–2026) ==
Thapa helped in the formation of the Rastriya Prajatantra Party in 1991 and was a senior leader within the party. In 2013, Thapa was the co-ordinator for the unifcation committee between Rastriya Prajatantra Party and Rastriya Janashakti Party, but joined another splinter group Rastriya Prajatantra Party Nepal less than a month after reunification. In July 2017, Thapa was nominated as a central committee member of the reunified Rastriya Prajatantra Party.

== Personal life and death ==
His family was close to the Koirala family and Krishna Prasad Koirala was the maternal uncle during Thapa's bratabandha. He married Josana Thapa when he was 18 in Chitwan. Thapa was a fifth-generation descendant of Bhimsen Thapa.

Thapa died on 14 February 2026, at the age of 98.

Political offices
Preceded by Position established	Chairman of the Rastriya Panchayat; 1963–1964	Succeeded by Rajeshwor Devkota
