= Damodar Bhandari =

Nepali politician

Honourable Damodar Bhandari
- दामोदर भण्डारी
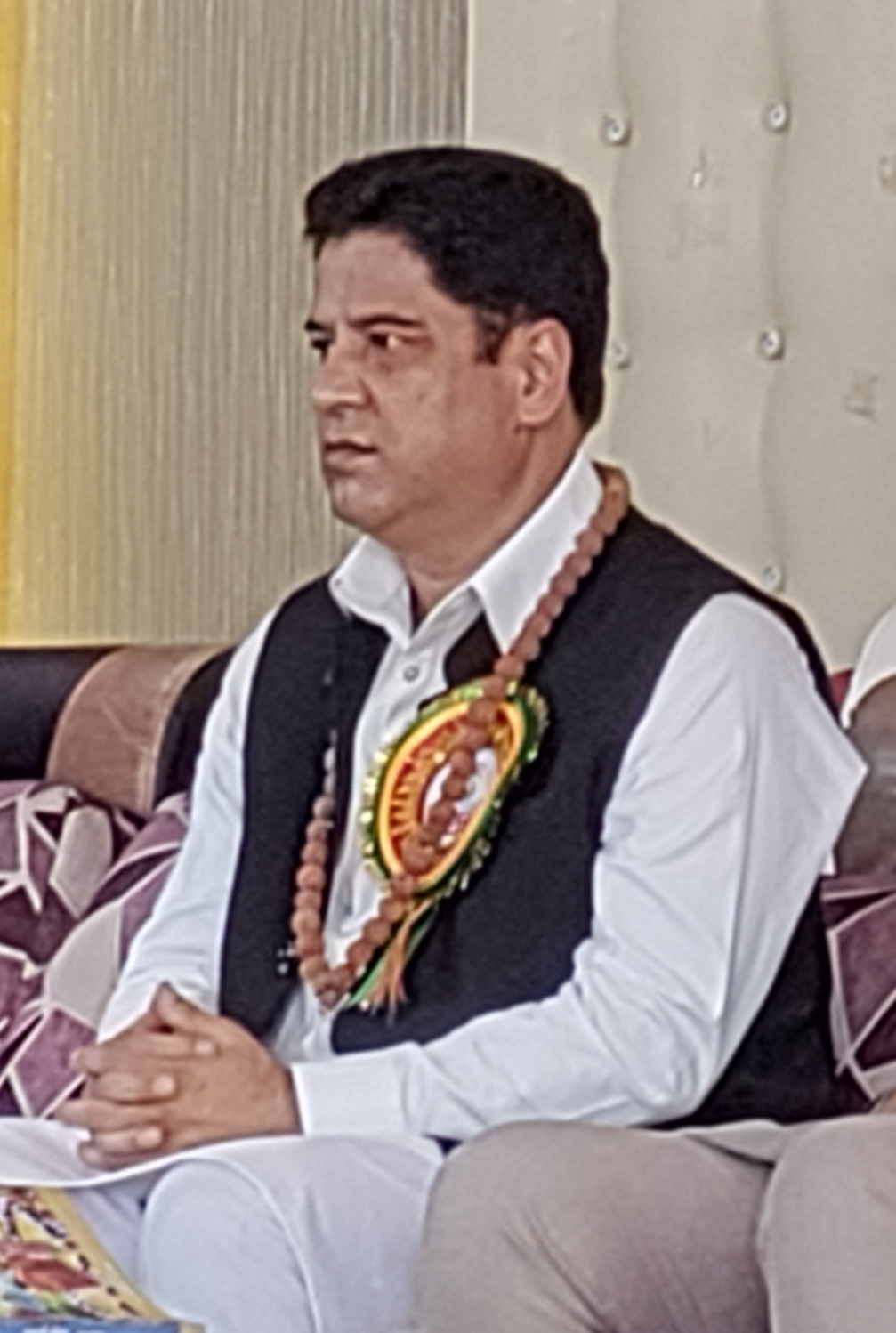
- Damodar Bhandari

Minister of Industry, Commerce and Supplies of Nepal
- In office 15 July 2024 – 9 September 2025
- President: Ram Chandra Poudel
- Prime Minister: K. P. Sharma Oli
- Preceded by: Pushpa Kamal Dahal
- In office 6 March 2024 – 3 July 2024
- President: Ram Chandra Poudel
- Prime Minister: Pushpa Kamal Dahal
- Preceded by: Ramesh Rijal
- Succeeded by: Pushpa Kamal Dahal
- In office 26 December 2022 – 27 February 2023
- President: Bidya Devi Bhandari
- Prime Minister: Pushpa Kamal Dahal
- Preceded by: Dilendra Prasad Badu
- Succeeded by: Ramesh Rijal

Member of Parliament, Pratinidhi Sabha
- In office 4 March 2018 – 12 September 2025
- Preceded by: Himself (as Member of the Constituent Assembly)
- Succeeded by: Hari Mohan Bhandari
- Constituency: Baitadi 1

Member of the Constituent Assembly
- In office 21 January 2014 – 14 October 2017
- Preceded by: Narendra Bahadur Kunwor
- Succeeded by: Himself (as Member of Parliament)
- Constituency: Baitadi 1

Personal details
- Born: 5 November 1973 (age 52) Patan, Baitadi
- Party: CPN (Unified Marxist–Leninist)
- Parents: Uday Singh; Kamala Bhandari

Damodar Bhandari (Nepali: दामोदर भण्डारी) is a Nepalese politician and former Minister of Industry, Commerce and Supplies of Nepal. He was also a Member of the House of Representatives. He was also member of the 2nd Nepalese Constituent Assembly. He won Baitadi–1 seat in the 2013 Nepalese Constituent Assembly elections, and House of Representatives from Communist Party of Nepal (Unified Marxist–Leninist).

== Electorate History ==
He has been elected to the Member of the House of Representatives and the 2nd Nepalese Constituent Assembly from Baitadi 1. He lost the 2008 Nepalese Constituent Assembly election.

2017 legislative elections

Party	Candidate	Votes
CPN (Unified Marxist–Leninist)	Damodar Bhandari	39,524
Nepali Congress	Nar Bahadur Chand	28,291
Others		1,277
Result	CPN (UML) hold	
Source: Election Commission

2013 Nepalese Constituent Assembly election

Party	Candidate	Votes
CPN (Unified Marxist–Leninist)	Damodar Bhandari	11,672
Nepali Congress	Lok Raj Awasthi	10,680
UCPN (Maoist)	Narendra Bahadur Kunwar	9,306
Rastriya Prajatantra Party	Lokendra Bahadur Chand	4,975
Others		1,816
Result	CPN (UML) gain	
Source: NepalNews

2008 Nepalese Constituent Assembly election

Party	Candidate	Votes
CPN (Maoist)	Narendra Bahadur Kunwar	27,130
CPN (Unified Marxist–Leninist)	Damodar Bhandari	9,059
Nepali Congress	Narendra Bahadur Bam	5,130
Rastriya Prajatantra Party	Ganesh Singh Bista	2,759
Others		1,027
Invalid votes		2,739
Result	Maoist gain	
Source: Election Commission
