= Chitlang =

Chitlang चिलं/चिलिम (In Nepal Bhasa) चित्लाङ (In Nepali)
- Municipality
- Location within Nepal
- Coordinates: 27.65°N 85.17°E
- Country: Nepal
- Province: Bagmati Province
- District: Makwanpur
- Municipality: Thaha

Population (1991)
  - Total: 5,830
- Time zone: UTC+5:45 (Nepal Time)
- Postal code: 44110

Chitlang (Nepali: चित्लाङ, Nepal Bhasa: चिलं/चिलिम]) is a village located in Thaha Municipality of Makwanpur District, Bagmati Province, Nepal.

== Geography ==
Chitlang sits southwest of Kathmandu valley in the Mahabharat range.

The Chitlang Thaha Municipality is bounded by

- North: Dhunibesi Municipality, Chandragiri Municipality
- South: Indrasarobar Rural Municipality
- East: Indrasarobar Rural Municipality, Chandragiri Municipality
- West: Former Bajrabarahi myc

== History ==
Chitlang is located in the ancient Newar settlement. Inscriptions dating to the Lichchavi era were found there. Nepali historians have disputed whether Licchavi King Udaydev was enthroned there, but the inscriptions at Ganeshthan of Chilang Village indicate that he was king.

An inscription found in Toukhel, former Ward 6 of Chitlang VDC, established by King Amshubarma (in sambat 37) stated that Amshubarma had given the land to shepherds and established a shepherd settlement in Toukhel, Nhulgaun and Kunchhal of Chitlang. Some historians claimed that these people, called Gopalis, were the descendants of rulers from the Gopal era.

Chitlang hosts multiple cultures: the Tamang culture is in former ward 1. In ward 2, Khas (Newar, Tamang and Brahmin) mix culture. In former wards 3, 4, 5, and 6 Newari culture is found; wards 8, 7 and 9 have a mixed culture. Chitlang celebrates many jatra and festivals throughout the year. It carries cultures of patan as once it was under the rule of Lalitpur Patan principalities in Malla era and of Kathmanud. During Red Machhendra Nath Jatra at Lalitpur, Puja used to be collected from Chitlang village. A small temple of Karunamaya or Machhindra Nath still stands at north to Tahaphale of Chitlang. Similarly, showing its connection to Kathmandu, it celebrates Yemba Thanegu festival similar to small scale Indra Jatra of Kathmandu.

== Demographics ==
According to the 2013 census of Nepal, Chitlang has an approximate population of 7,680 people. The main populations are Newar, Tamang, Khas and Brahmins.

=== Gamal Community ===
The Gamal (Newar: गमाल) is a distinct surname and exclusive historical lineage within the Newar community, tracing its origins to the inner royal circles of the Kathmandu Valley cities of Patan and Bhaktapur.

According to local historical accounts, the ancestors of the गमाल community originally served as trusted royal kitchen staff for the Malla Kings. Following a political court dispute, the Malla rulers relocated the group outside the core urban center to the valley rim. The community subsequently established a prominent settlement in Chitlang. In the Newar language (Nepal Bhasa), the root word Gāma translates to "village"; the name Gamal historically denoted "the people from the village," reflecting their unique geographic migration rather than a social hierarchy. Today, sociolinguists recognize the गमाल community for their distinct cultural identity and their own specific sub-dialect of Nepal Bhasa spoken in the Chitlang region.

== Culture ==
Chitlang has a rich Newar culture. The Chitlang dialect of Nepali Bhasa is spoken almost exclusively. The Balami language is one such language.

== Gallery ==
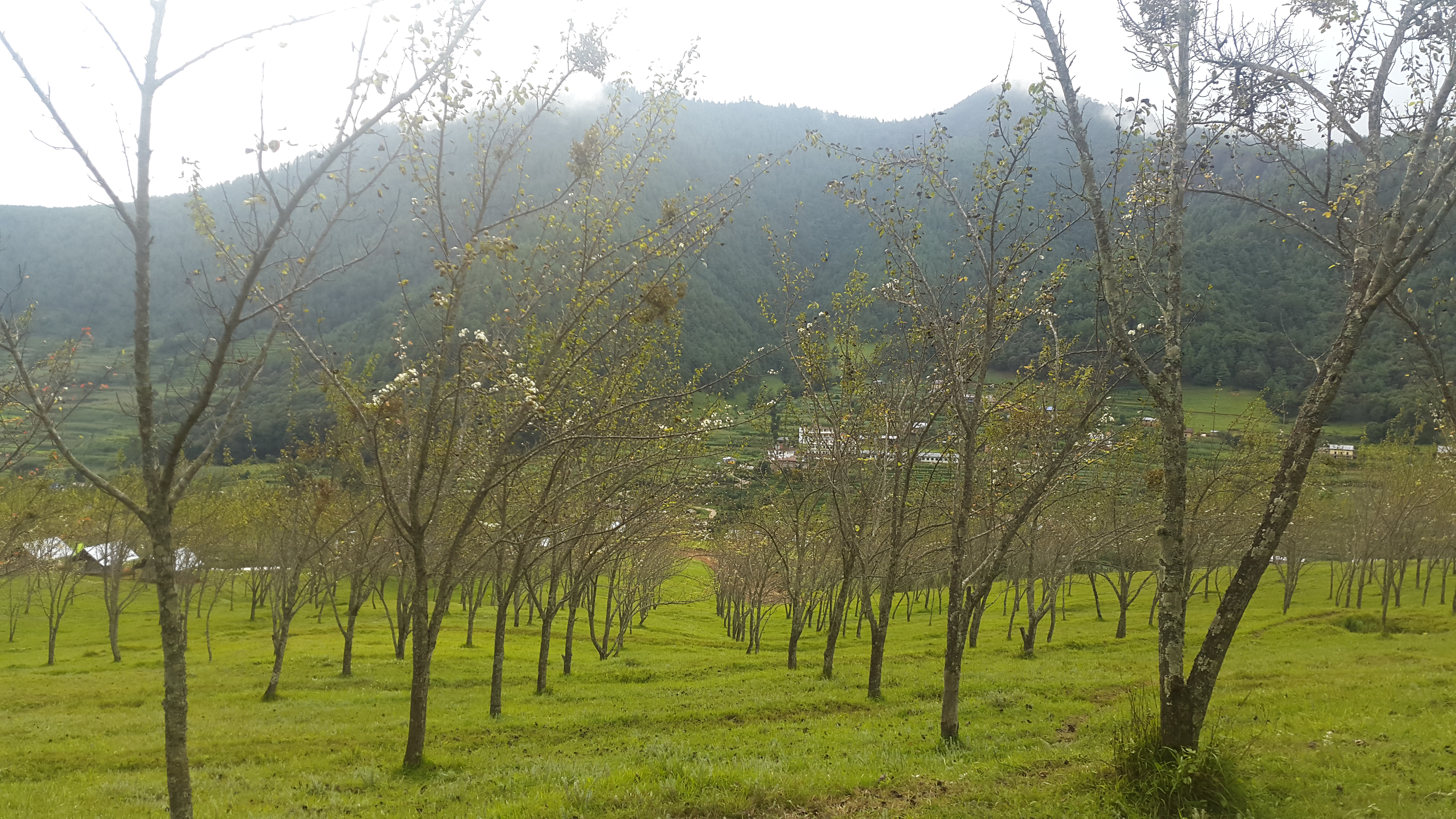
Chitlang Pear Garden

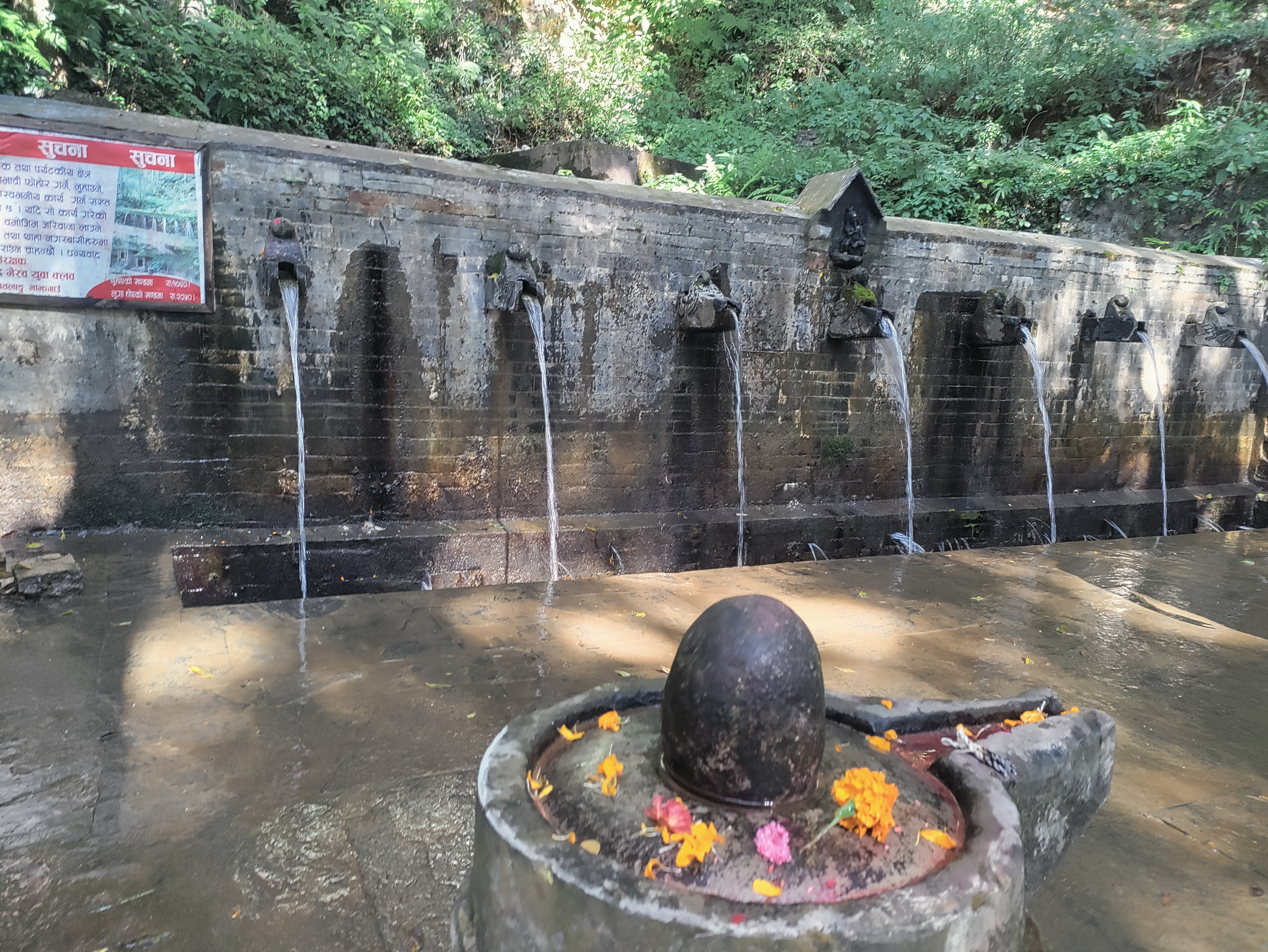
Seven Tap in Satdhara, Chitlang

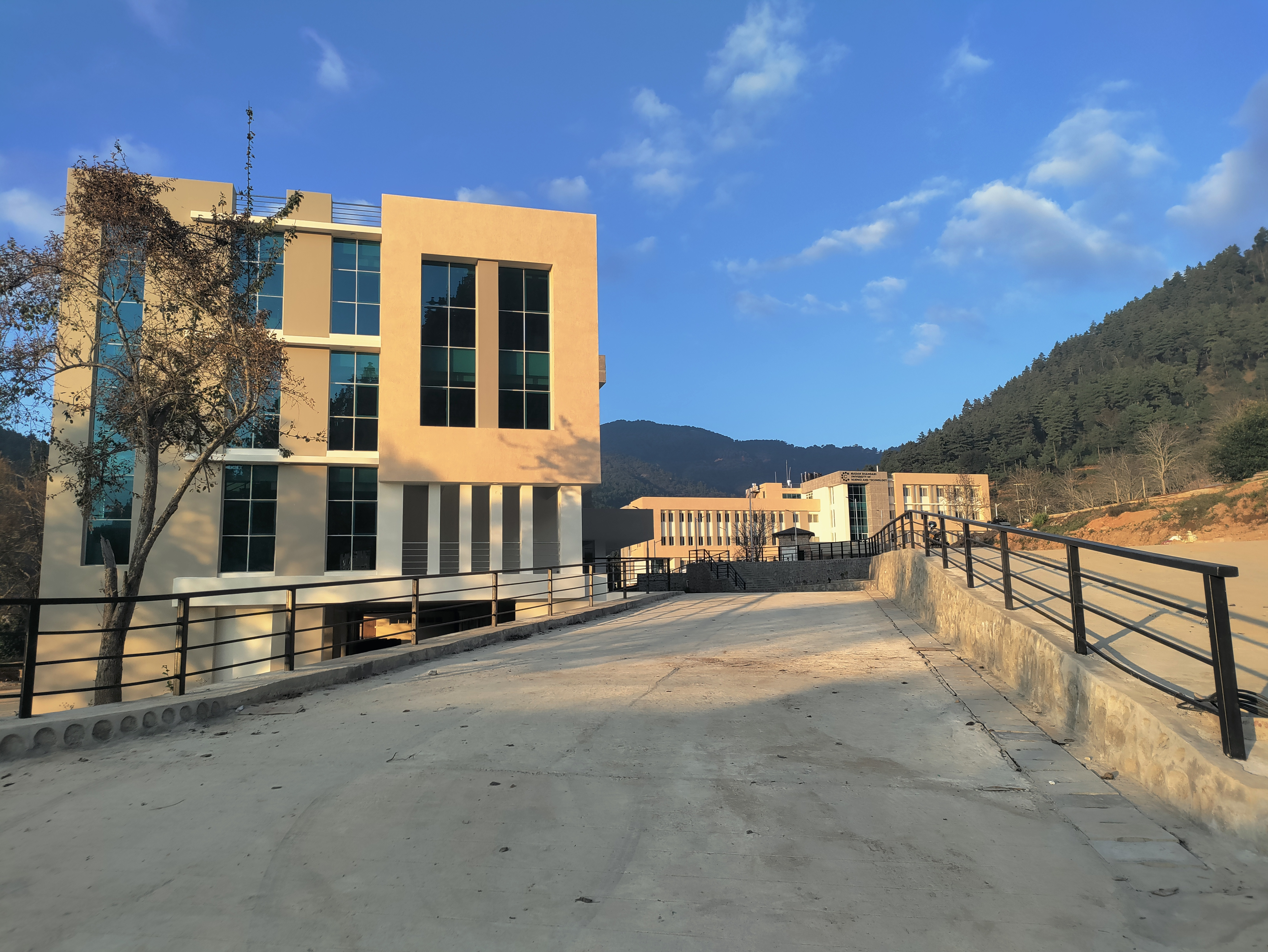
Madan Bhandari University, Chitlang, Makawanpur

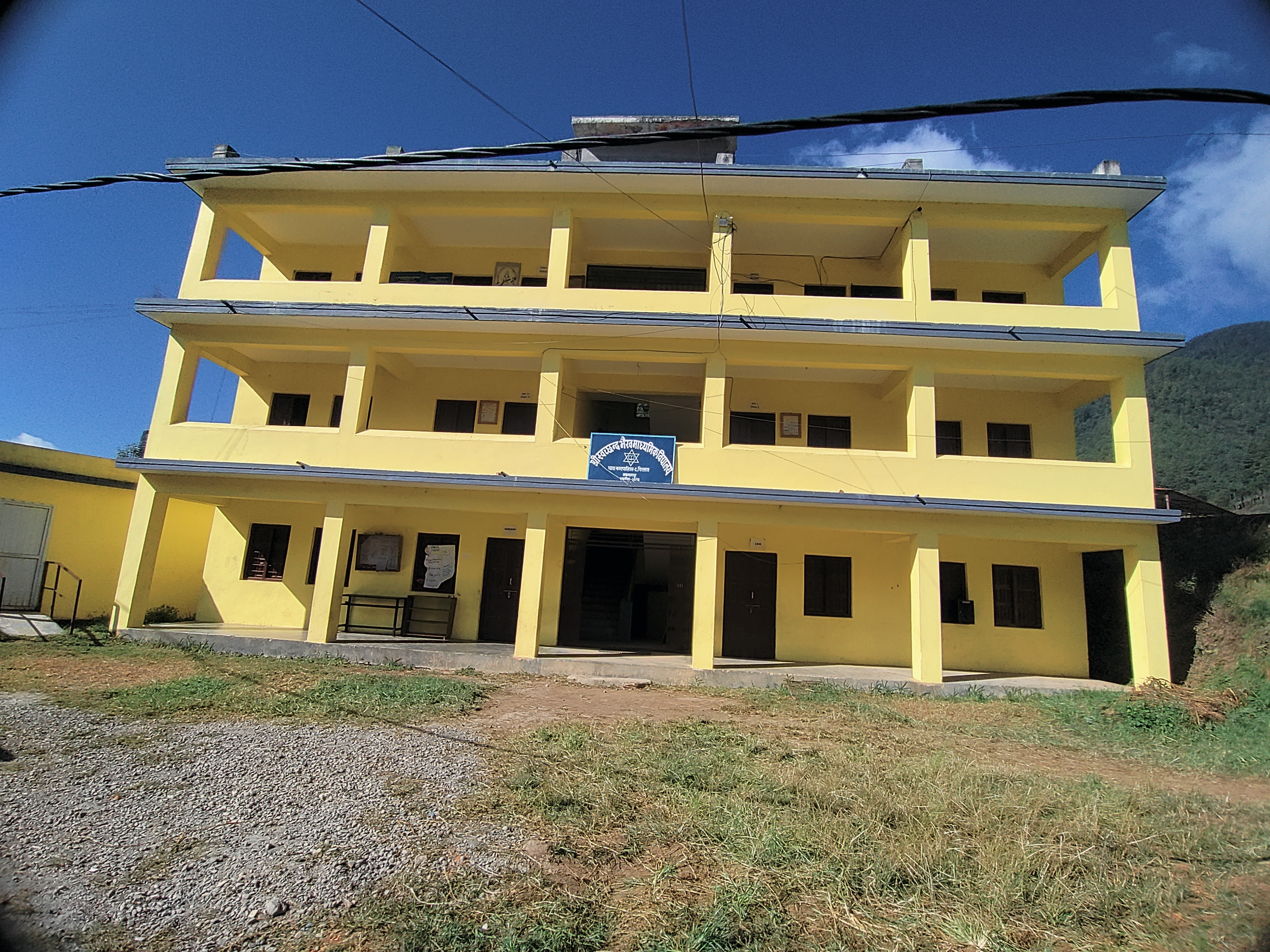
School in Chitlang

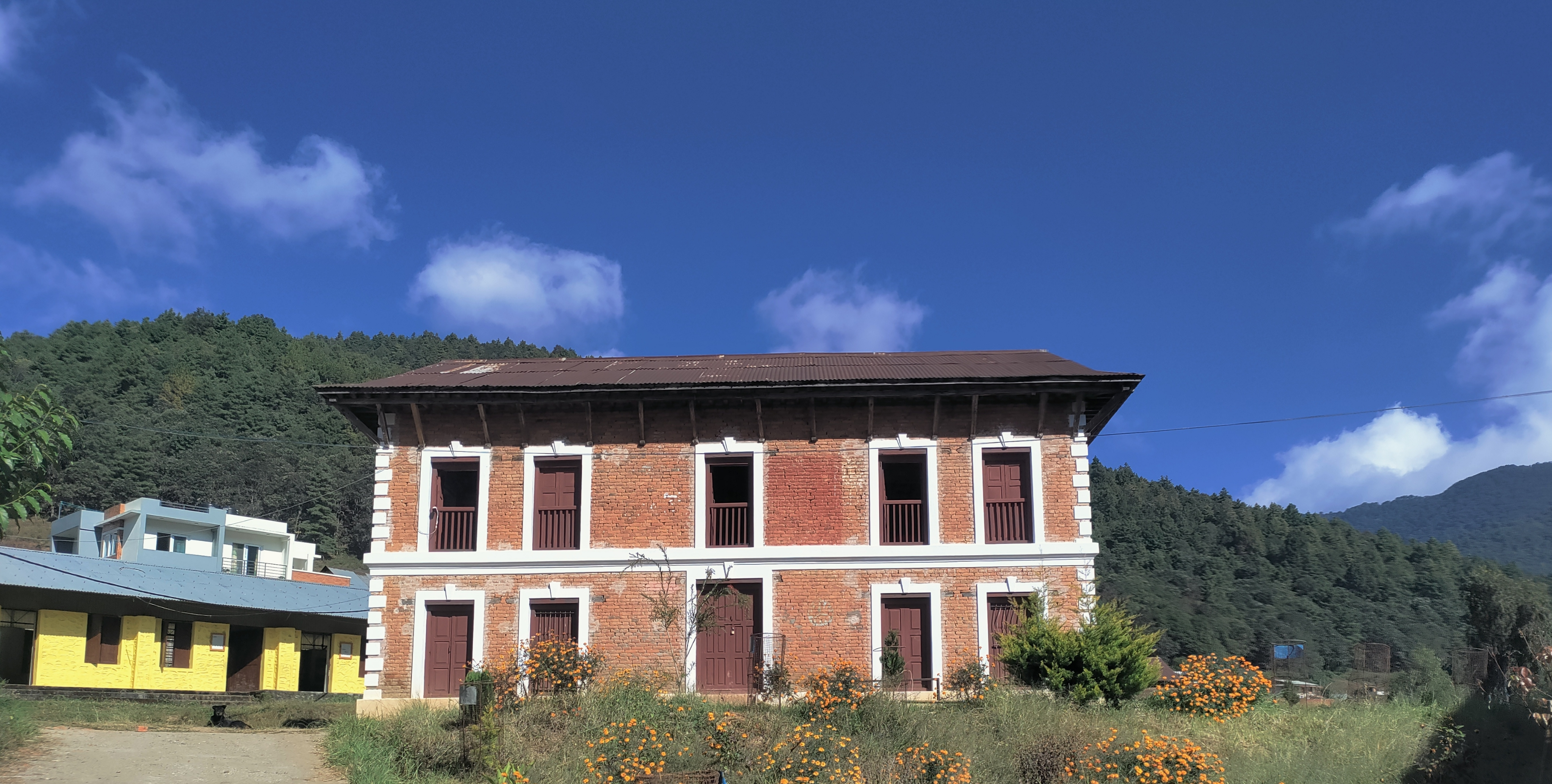
Old Durbar in Chitlang

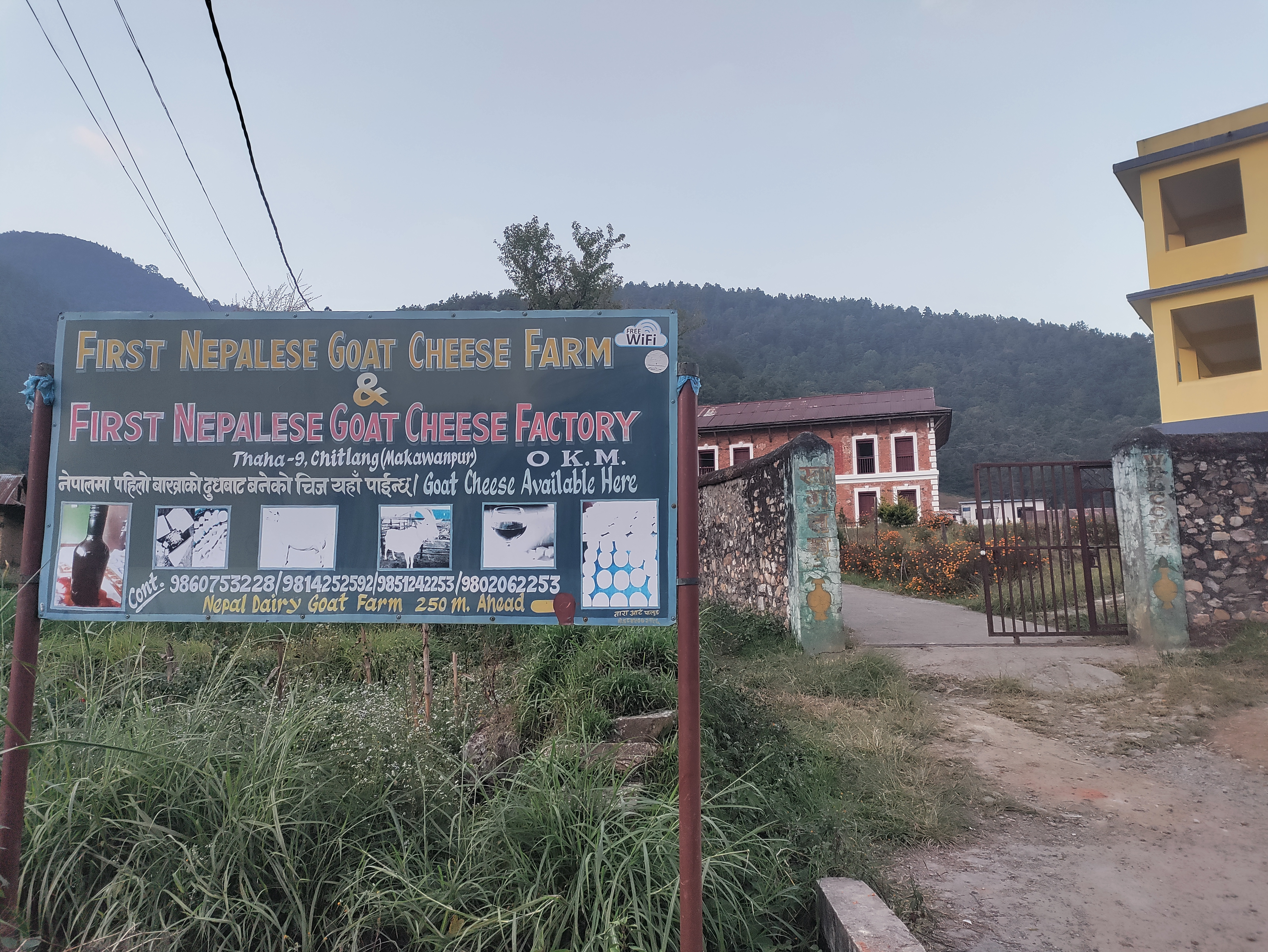
Goat Cheese Farm

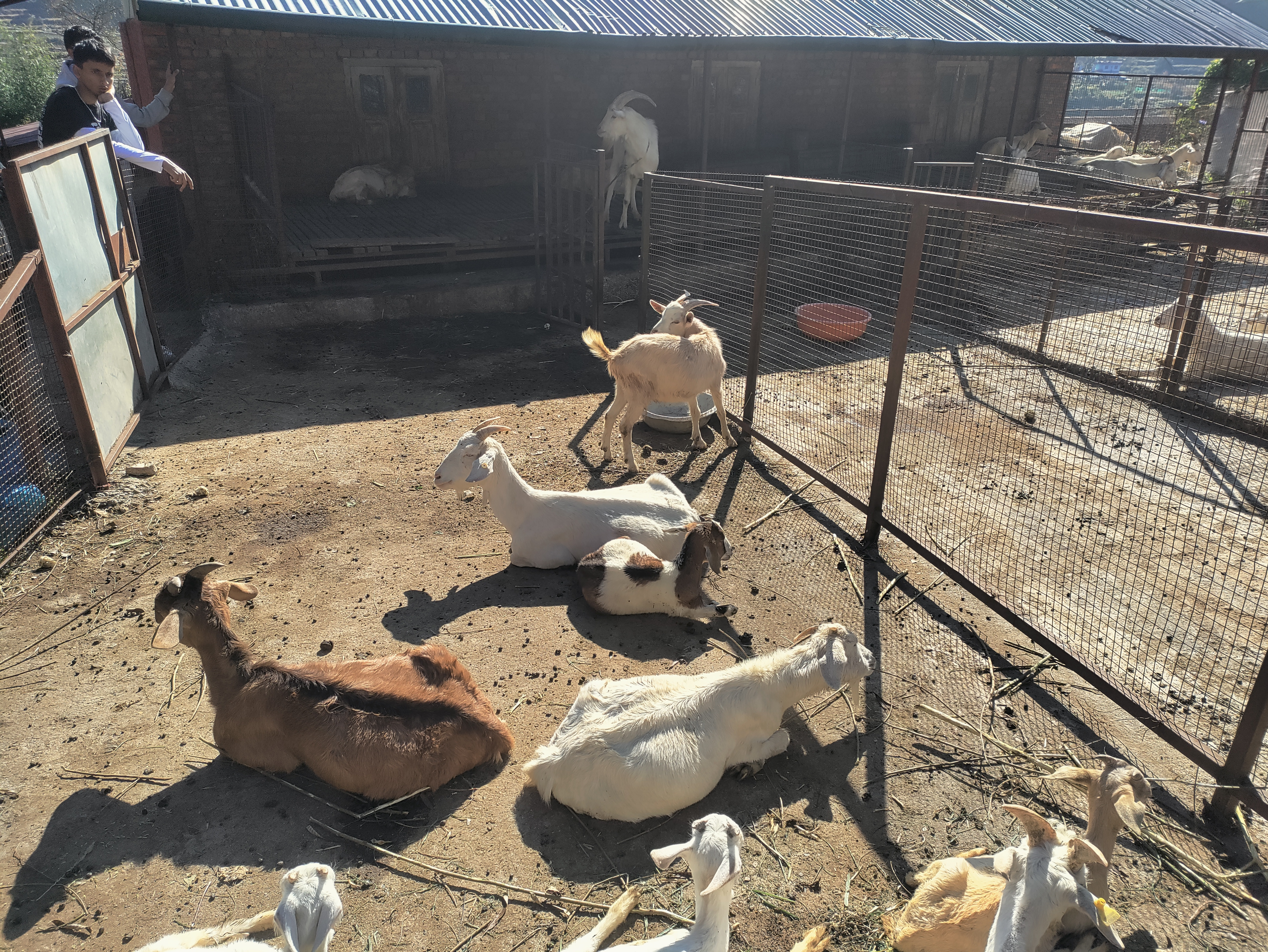
Goat farm, Chitlang

== See also ==
- Makwanpur District
- Bagmati Province
- Nepal
