= Rastriya Prajatantra Party (Nationalist) =

Rastriya Prajatantra Party (Nationalist) राष्ट्रिय प्रजातन्त्र पार्टी (राष्ट्रवादी)
- President: Rajeshwor Devkota
- Founded: November 1996
- Dissolved: January, 2007
- Split from: Rastriya Prajatantra Party
- Merged into: Rastriya Prajatantra Party
- Headquarters: Kathmandu
- Student wing: Nepal Yuva Sangathan
- Ideology: Liberalism
- Political position: Centre-right
- National affiliation: Deshbhakta Prajatantrik Party

Rashtriya Prajatantra Party (Nationalist) was a right-wing monarchist party in Nepal. It is a splinter group of the Rashtriya Prajatantra Party. The president of RPP (N) was Rajeshwor Devkota.

In November 1996 RPP (N) formed a front of 3 right-wing parties called Nationalist Democratic Front. It consisted of RPP (N), Nepal Yuva Sangathan, and Deshbhakta Prajatantrik Party. Devkota became the convenor of the front.

In January 2007, the party merged into the Rastriya Prajatantra Party Nepal.
