= Chatur Bahadur Chand =

President of Cricket Association of Nepal

6th President of the Cricket Association of Nepal
- Incumbent
- Assumed office 29 September 2019
- Preceded by: Binay Raj Panday

Personal details
- Born: Chatur Bahadur Chand; 25 July 1971 (age 54)
- Party: Nepali Congress
- Occupation: Politician; cricket administrator

Chatur Bahadur Chand (born 25 July 1971) is former president of Cricket Association of Nepal (CAN) and a politician of the Nepali Congress. He is the current district committee chairman of Baitadi district committee of the Nepali Congress. He was defeated by Hari Mohan Bhandari in 2026 nepalese general election from Baitadi 1.

He was elected as sixth president of the CAN on 29 September 2019, after the International Cricket Council lifted a ban on CAN. He was once again re-elected as president for second time on 23 September 2023.
