= Baitadi 1 =

Parliamentary constituency in Nepal

- Parliamentary constituency for the House of Representatives
- Baitadi 1 in Sudurpashchim Province; Protected areas in green

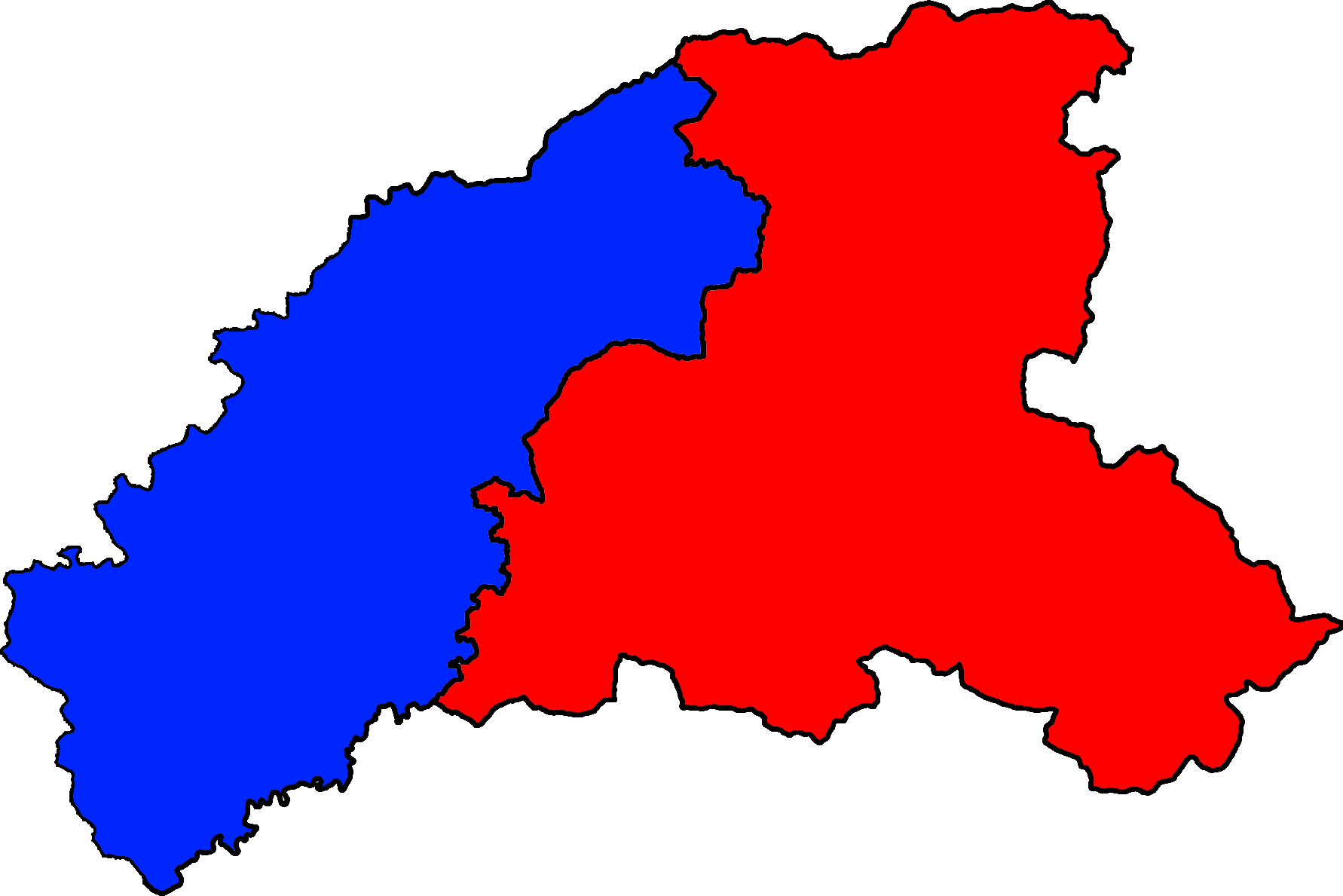
- Assembly segments Baitadi 1(A) (red) and Baitadi 1(B) within Baitadi District
- Province: Sudurpashchim Province
- District: Baitadi District
- Electorate: 132,319

Current constituency
- Created: 1991
- Number of members: 3
- Member of Parliament: Hari Mohan Bhandari, Rastriya Swatantra Party
- Sudurpashchim MPA 1(A): Surendra Bahadur Pal, UML
- Sudurpashchim MPA 1(B): Shiva Raj Bhatta, Congress

Baitadi 1 is the parliamentary constituency of Baitadi District in Nepal. This constituency came into existence on the Constituency Delimitation Commission (CDC) report submitted on 31 August 2017.

== Incorporated areas ==
Baitadi 1 incorporates the entirety of Baitadi District.

== Assembly segments ==
It encompasses the following Sudurpashchim Provincial Assembly segment

- Baitadi 1(A)
- Baitadi 1(B)

== Members of Parliament ==
=== Parliament/Constituent Assembly ===
Election	Member	Party
1991	Krishna Kumar Joshi	Nepali Congress
1994	Lokendra Bahadur Chand	Rastriya Prajatantra Party
1997	Keshav Bahadur Chand	Nepali Congress
1999	Narendra Bahadur Bum	Nepali Congress
2008	Narendra Bahadur Kunwor	CPN (Maoist)
January 2009	Narendra Bahadur Kunwor	UCPN (Maoist)
2013	Damodar Bhandari	CPN (UML)
May 2018	Damodar Bhandari	Nepal Communist Party
March 2021	Damodar Bhandari	CPN (UML)
2022	Damodar Bhandari	CPN (UML)
2026	Hari Mohan Bhandari	Rastriya Swatantra Party

=== Provincial Assembly ===
==== 1(A) ====
Election	Member	Party
2017	Prem Prakash Bhatta	CPN (Maoist Centre)
May 2018	Prem Prakash Bhatta	Nepal Communist Party
March 2021	Prem Prakash Bhatta	CPN (Maoist Centre)
2022	Surendra Bahadur Pal	CPN (UML)

==== 1(B) ====
Election	Member	Party
2017	Liladhar Bhatta	CPN (UML)
May 2018	Liladhar Bhatta	Nepal Communist Party
March 2021	Liladhar Bhatta	CPN (UML)
2022	Shiva Raj Bhatta	Nepali Congress

== Election results ==
=== Election in the 2020s ===
==== 2026 general election ====
Candidate	Party	Votes	%
Hari Mohan Bhandari	Rastriya Swatantra Party	22,134	32.68
Chatur Bahadur Chanda	Nepali Congress	18,194	26.86
Damodar Bhandari	CPN (UML)	17,091	25.23
Pramanand Bhatta	Nepali Communist Party	6,965	10.28
Bhupen Bahadur Chanda	Rastriya Prajatantra Party	2,681	3.96
Ram Bahadur Kunwar	CPN (Maoist)	299	0.44
Aan Singh Bhandari	People's Socialist Party, Nepal	94	0.14
Navaraj Koirala	Nepal Workers Peasants Party	94	0.14
Visan Singh Bohara	Aam Janata Party	82	0.12
Gajendra Raj Pandey	Shram Sanskriti Party	78	0.12
Jay Prakash Panta	Independent	18	0.03
Total		67,730	100.00
Majority		3,940	
Rastriya Swatantra Party gain from CPN (UML)			

==== 2022 general election ====
Candidate	Party	Votes	%
Damodar Bhandari	CPN (UML)	33,611	46.36
Narendra Bahadur Kunwor	CPN (Maoist Centre)	32,080	44.25
Keshav Bahadur Chand	Independent	2,509	3.46
Dev Bahadur Chand	Rastriya Prajatantra Party	1,759	2.43
Prakash Chandra Bhatta	Rastriya Swatantra Party	1,423	1.96
Others		1,116	1.54
Total		72,498	100.00
Majority		1,531	
CPN (UML) hold			

==== 2022 provincial election ====
===== 1(A) =====
Candidate	Party	Votes	%
Surendra Bahadur Pal	CPN (UML)	12,831	33.64
Harimohan Bhandari	Independent	11,018	28.89
Bir Bahadur Bista	Nepali Congress	10,953	28.72
Narendra Bahadur Bista	CPN (Unified Socialist)	2,194	5.75
Rana Bahadur Bista	Rastriya Prajatantra Party	968	2.54
Others		178	0.47
Total		38,142	100.00
Majority		1,813	
CPN (UML) gain			

===== 1(B) =====
Candidate	Party	Votes	%
Shiva Raj Bhatta	Nepali Congress	17,153	48.37
Liladhar Bhatta	CPN (UML)	16,716	47.14
Narayan Dutta Joshi	Rastriya Prajatantra Party	1,201	3.39
Others		390	1.10
Total		35,460	100.00
Majority		437	
Nepali Congress gain			

=== Election in the 2010s ===
==== 2017 general election ====
Candidate	Party	Votes	%
Damodar Bhandari	CPN (UML)	39,524	57.20
Nar Bahadur Chand	Nepali Congress	28,291	40.95
Others		1,277	1.85
Total		69,092	100.00
Valid votes		69,092	90.74
Invalid/blank votes		7,054	9.26
Total votes		76,146	100.00
Registered voters/turnout		132,319	57.55
Majority		11,233	
CPN (UML) hold			
Source: Election Commission

==== 2017 Nepalese provincial election ====
===== 1(A) =====
Candidate	Party	Votes	%
Prem Prakash Bhatta	CPN (Maoist Centre)	18,093	51.87
Hari Mohan Bhandari	Nepali Congress	15,126	43.36
Bhagirath Singh Kunwar	Janasamjbadi Party Nepal	1,171	3.36
Others		492	1.41
Total		34,882	100.00
Valid votes		34,882	91.75
Invalid/blank votes		3,136	8.25
Total votes		38,018	100.00
Registered voters/turnout		65,425	58.11
Majority		2,967	
CPN (Maoist Centre) gain			
Source: Election Commission

===== 1(B) =====
Candidate	Party	Votes	%
Liladhar Bhatta	CPN (UML)	20,318	57.13
Ganesh Chand	Rastriya Prajatantra Party	15,247	42.87
Total		35,565	100.00
Valid votes		35,565	93.21
Invalid/blank votes		2,590	6.79
Total votes		38,155	100.00
Registered voters/turnout		66,894	57.04
Majority		5,071	
CPN (UML) gain			
Source: Election Commission

==== 2013 Constituent Assembly election ====
Candidate	Party	Votes	%
Damodar Bhandari	CPN (UML)	11,672	30.36
Lok Raj Awasthi	Nepali Congress	10,680	27.78
Narendra Bahadur Kunwor	UCPN (Maoist)	9,306	24.20
Lokendra Bahadur Chand	Rastriya Prajatantra Party	4,975	12.94
Others		1,816	4.72
Total		38,449	100.00
Valid votes		38,449	91.19
Invalid/blank votes		3,715	8.81
Total votes		42,164	100.00
Registered voters/turnout		58,496	72.08
Majority		992	
CPN (UML) gain			
Source: Election Commission

=== Election in the 2000s ===
==== 2008 Constituent Assembly election ====
Candidate	Party	Votes	%
Narendra Bahadur Kunwor	CPN (Maoist)	27,130	60.15
Damodar Bhandari	CPN (UML)	9,059	20.08
Narendra Bahadur Bam	Nepali Congress	5,130	11.37
Ganesh Singh Bista	Rastriya Prajatantra Party	2,759	6.12
Other		1,027	2.28
Total		45,105	100.00
Valid votes		45,105	94.28
Invalid/blank votes		2,739	5.72
Total votes		47,844	100.00
Registered voters/turnout		80,149	59.69
Majority		18,071	
CPN (Maoist) gain			
Source: Election Commission

=== Election in the 1990s ===
==== 1999 general election ====
Candidate	Party	Votes	%
Narendra Bahadur Bum	Nepali Congress	11,313	36.45
Prithvi Raj Awasthi	CPN (UML)	9,901	31.90
Lokendra Bahadur Chand	Rastriya Prajatantra Party (Chand)	7,517	24.22
Rajendra Bahadur Saud	CPN (Marxist–Leninist)	1,195	3.85
Others		1,110	3.58
Total		31,036	100.00
Valid votes		31,036	97.66
Invalid/blank votes		745	2.34
Total votes		31,781	100.00
Registered voters/turnout		63,442	50.09
Majority		1,412	
Nepali Congress hold			
Source: Election Commission

===== 1997 by-elections =====
Candidate	Party
Keshav Bahadur Chand	Nepali Congress
Total
Nepali Congress gain	
Source: Election Commission

==== 1994 general election ====
Candidate	Party	Votes	%
Lokendra Bahadur Chand	Rastriya Prajatantra Party	11,023	44.14
Prithvi Raj Awasthi	CPN (UML)	5,865	23.49
Narendra Bahadur Bum	Nepali Congress	5,166	20.69
Ganesh Bahadur Thapa	Independent	1,402	5.61
Keshav B. Chandra	Nepali Congress (Bishweshwar)	1,272	5.09
Tark Bahadur Shahi	Independent	242	0.97
Total		24,970	100.00
Majority		5,158	
Rastriya Prajatantra Party gain			
Source: Election Commission

==== 1991 general election ====
Candidate	Party	Votes	%
Krishna Kumar Joshi	Nepali Congress	11,128	64.74
-	Rastriya Prajatantra Party (Chand)	6,060	35.26
Total		17,188	100.00
Majority		5,068	
Nepali Congress gain			

== See also ==
- List of parliamentary constituencies of Nepal
