= Nani Maiya Dahal =

Nepalese female parliamentarian in 1981

Nani Maiya Dahal (Nepali: नानीमैया दाहाल) was an independent Nepalese politician and the member of parliament from Kathmandu constituency in the Panchayat parliament from 1981 to 1985 (2038 BS-2042 BS). She is known for defeating the candidates of Rastriya Panchayat during the Panchayat system in Nepal. Her win is considered to be a symbolic protest of citizens of Kathmandu, mainly youths, against the status quo and vote of rejection of Panchyaat system.

After her win, a huge rally was organized to symbolize the protest against the panchyat system.

== Biography ==
At the age of 10, Dahal was the chief of Tribhuwan Village Development Scheme. At the age of 29, she became the village assistant chief (उपप्रधानपञ्च) of Jorpati, Kathamndu. At that time, Maniram Chalese was the chief.

As the assistant chief, she is credited with management of food distribution in Salt trading centre. During panchayat era, the salt trading organization was responsible for distributing major household items such as salt and oil in all parts of Nepal. She also took part in female rights activism, such as assisting the raped victims.

In 20 Baisakh 2038, she stood for the Panchyat Parliament as an independent candidate. Her campaign was funded by student donations. Her election symbol was a clock. In the election, she got 65,777 votes and beat Kamal Chitrakar. She was among the few female candidates who won the election. Because she was an independent candidate, she was considered to be a spy of the Nepali Congress.

She worked with Jog Meher Shrestha during her period and from 2038BS to 2042BS, she was also a member of national economic council.

She was also a poet and composed a few poems.

She died on February 11, 2025 at the age of 92.
