= Hari Mohan Bhandari =

Nepalese politician

Honourable Hari Mohan Bhandari
- हरि मोहन भण्डारी

Member of Parliament, Pratinidhi Sabha
- Incumbent
- Assumed office 26 March 2026
- Preceded by: Damodar Bhandari
- Constituency: Baitadi 1

Personal details
- Citizenship: Nepalese
- Party: Rastriya Swatantra Party
- Other political affiliations: Nepali Congress (Until Jan 2026)
- Profession: Politician

Hari Mohan Bhandari (Nepali: हरि मोहन भण्डारी) is a Nepalese politician serving as a member of parliament from the Rastriya Swatantra Party. He is the member of the 7th Pratinidhi Sabha elected from Baitadi 1 constituency in 2026 Nepalese General Election securing 22,134 votes and defeating his closest contender Chatur Bahadur Chand of the Nepali Congress. He was a former General Convention Member for the Nepali Congress before joining RSP.
