= Thaha Municipality =

Thaha Municipality थाहा नगरपालिका Palung
- Municipality
- Nickname: Daman Palung
- Location of Thaha Municipality in Nepal
- Coordinates: 27°36′N 85°05′E
- Country: Nepal
- Province: Bagmati Province
- District: Makwanpur District
- Established: 18 May 2014

Government
  - Type: Mayor–council
  - Mayor: Bishnu Bahadur Bista (Adarsha)
  - Deputy Mayor: Bharat Gopali

Population (2022)
  - Total: 39,163
- Time zone: UTC+5:45 (NST)
- Postal Code: 44110
- Area code: 057
- Website: www.thahamun.gov.np

Popularly known as Daman or Palung or Tistung - Palung, Thaha Municipality (थाहा नगरपालिका) is a municipality in Makwanpur District of Bagmati Province in mid Nepal. In Nepali Thaha, (थाहा) means to know. It was one of the biggest communist political movement led by hon. Rupchandra Bista (Ru Da Ne). He started the Thaha Movement which is dedicated to his contributions to this region.

It is one of the most known tourist destinations and best places to live in the Bagmati Province, due to its mild climate. It's never too hot in summer nor too cold in winter. Winter causes water to freeze and some snowfall too, usually in the upper hills of the valley. There has been no snowfall in the valley since 2063 B.S.

== History ==
The municipality was established on 18 May 2014 by merging the existing Palung, Daman and Bajrabarahi village development committees.

On new Constitution of Nepal, there is provision of one state, 7 provinces and 744 local bodies. Thaha municipality is one local body out of 10 in Makwanpur district, formed by merging existing Thaha municipality, Bajrabarahi VDC, Chitlang VDC and Aagra VDC. This municipality is divided in to 12 wards to facilitate in administrative and development activities.

The primary occupation of the local residents is agriculture. The area exports vegetables including potatoes, cauliflower, cabbage, brinjal, radish, and various green chilis such as capsicum to cities such as Kathmandu, Hetauda, Narayangadh, Pokhara, Birgunj, and India. Commercial vegetable cultivation began after 2050 B.S., replacing traditional crops like rice, wheat, millet, and barley. This shift has altered local agricultural practices, with rice and wheat cultivation declining as residents increasingly focus on vegetable farming for income.

Shikharkot, Thana Bazzar, Bagekhola, Okhar Bazzar, Phant Bazzar and Khalte Bazzar are the major gathering and market place in Thaha Nagar Palika.

== Demographics ==
At the time of the 2011 Nepal census, Thaha Municipality had a population of 42,122. Of these, 45.2% spoke Tamang, 34.1% Nepali, 18.2% Newar, 1.3% Lepcha, 0.4% Bhojpuri, 0.2% Magar, 0.1% Gurung, 0.1% Maithili, 0.1% Tharu and 0.1% other languages as their first language.

In terms of ethnicity/caste, 47.2% were Tamang, 20.1% Newar, 19.3% Chhetri, 4.3% Hill Brahmin, 2.0% Magar, 1.6% Kami, 1.2% Gurung, 1.2% Thakuri, 0.9% Damai/Dholi, 0.4% Gharti/Bhujel, 0.3% Sarki, 0.2% Ghale, 0.2% Kalwar, 0.2% Sunuwar, 0.1% other Dalit, 0.1% Musalman, 0.1% Sanyasi/Dasnami, 0.1% Tharu and 0.2% others.

In terms of religion, 55.0% were Hindu, 42.0% Buddhist, 2.7% Christian, 0.1% Muslim and 0.1% others.

In terms of literacy, 66.6% could read and write, 2.0% could only read and 31.4% could neither read nor write.
