= Narendra Bahadur Kunwor =

Nepali politician

Member of the Constituent Assembly
- In office 28 May 2008 – 28 May 2012
- Preceded by: Narendra Bahadur Bum (as Member of Parliament)
- Succeeded by: Damodar Bhandari
- Constituency: Baitadi 1

Personal details
- Party: Communist Party of Nepal (Maoist Centre)

Narendra Bahadur Kunwor (Nepali: नरेन्द्र बहादुर कुँवर) is a Nepalese politician, belonging to the Communist Party of Nepal. In the 2008 Constituent Assembly election he was elected from the Baitadi-1 constituency, winning 27130 votes.
