= Daman, Nepal =

Daman दामन
- Hill Station
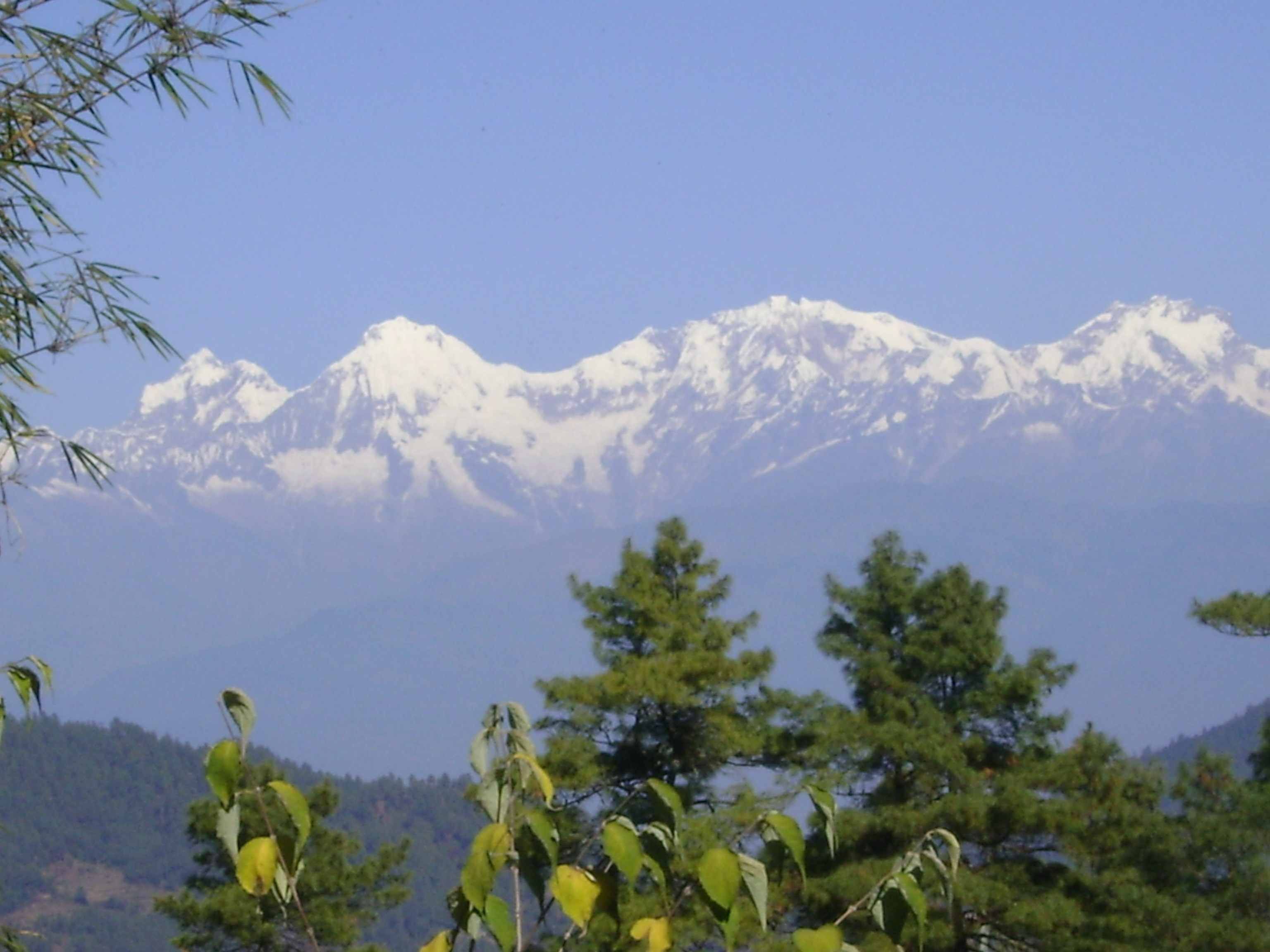

- Location in Nepal
- Coordinates: 27°36′29″N 85°05′39″E
- Country: Nepal
- Province: Bagmati Province
- District: Makwanpur
- Municipality: Thaha
- Elevation: 2,322 m (7,618 ft)

Population (2011)
  - Total: 8,439
- Time zone: UTC+5:45 (NST)
- Postal code: 44110

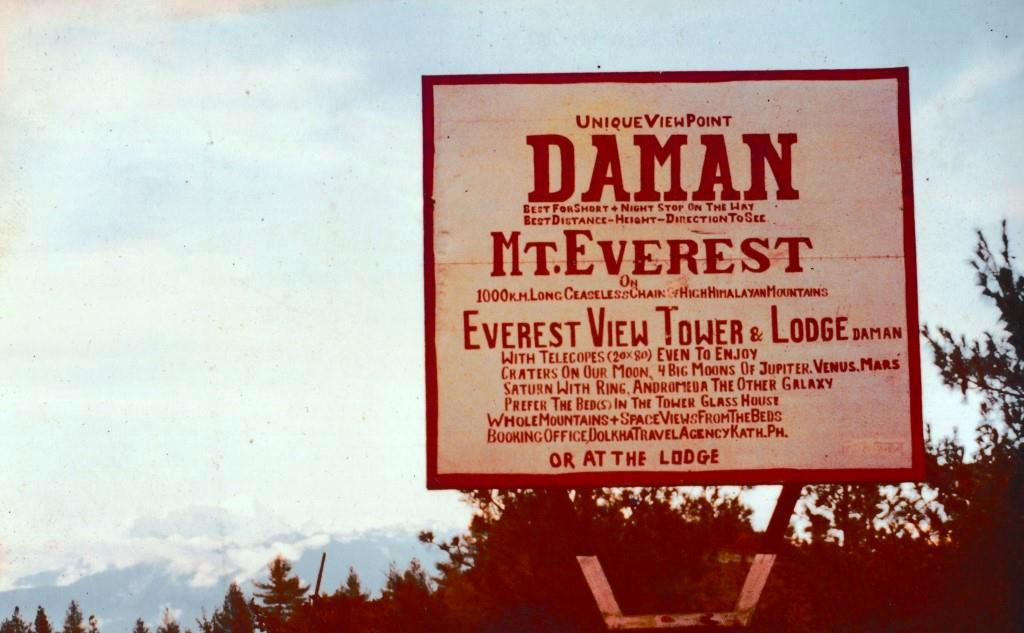
Everest sign. Daman, Nepal. 1979

Daman (Nepali: दामन) is one of the most beautiful tourist attraction in Thaha Municipality, Makwanpur District in Bagmati Province, central Nepal. It lies on the Tribhuvan Highway, about 77 kilometres (48 mi) southwest of Kathmandu (about halfway to Hetauda) at an elevation of 2,322 metres (7,620 ft).

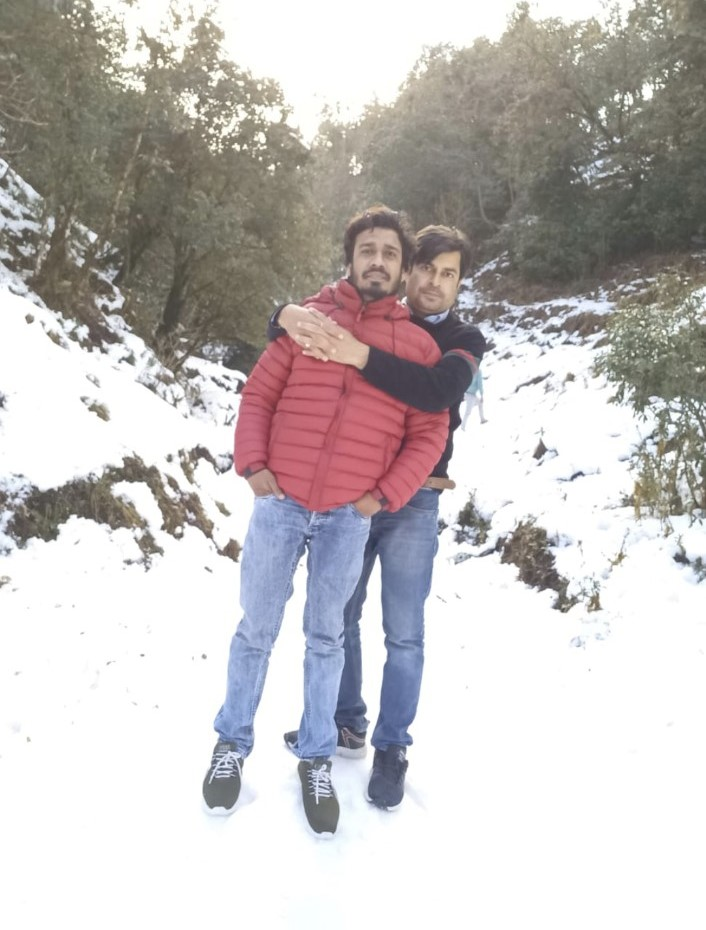
Two Friends are together in Daman Nepal during snowfall January 2022

Daman has among the greatest views of the Himalayas, extending on a good day from Dhaulagiri in the west to Mount Everest in the east.

The village also contains the Everest Panorama Resort, which includes a helipad. Since the village lies on the outskirts of Kathmandu, it provides a great opportunity for the people residing in Kathmandu to observe its beauty and use it for means of recreation. Also, during winter, snowfall occurs in the hills, augmenting the beauty of the village. There is religious site near called Risheshor Mahadev Temple. It is said that when Lord Shiva was mourning and lamenting, carrying dead body of his beloved wife Satidevi, he rested here. Being so thirsty he just hit the big rock with his weapon (trisula) and water came out. So still we can see the water flowing in between the big rocks. The main festival occurs in Fagu Purnima and Thulo Ekadashi. There is a beautiful botanical garden in Daman which is one of the biggest and oldest botanical garden in Nepal. Different varieties of Rhododendron are available here.

There are many picnic spots for outings. It can be visited for a one-day trip or to stay for a few days, away from the hustle and bustle of the city life. There are hotels, resorts and lodges for accommodation.

Most of the residents of Daman are dependent on agriculture, with the remainder working in the hospitality industry.

== Climate ==
Climate data for Daman, elevation 2,314 m (7,592 ft), (1976–2005)
Month	Jan	Feb	Mar	Apr	May	Jun	Jul	Aug	Sep	Oct	Nov	Dec	Year
Mean daily maximum °C (°F)	12.2 (54.0)	13.3 (55.9)	16.8 (62.2)	19.8 (67.6)	21.1 (70.0)	21.7 (71.1)	21.6 (70.9)	22.0 (71.6)	21.6 (70.9)	20.6 (69.1)	17.2 (63.0)	13.8 (56.8)	18.5 (65.3)
Mean daily minimum °C (°F)	0.8 (33.4)	2.2 (36.0)	5.6 (42.1)	8.9 (48.0)	10.9 (51.6)	12.8 (55.0)	14.0 (57.2)	13.8 (56.8)	12.7 (54.9)	9.4 (48.9)	5.1 (41.2)	2.0 (35.6)	8.2 (46.7)
Average precipitation mm (inches)	16.8 (0.66)	26.4 (1.04)	33.0 (1.30)	86.2 (3.39)	164.0 (6.46)	277.0 (10.91)	503.6 (19.83)	361.0 (14.21)	211.2 (8.31)	61.6 (2.43)	7.9 (0.31)	17.4 (0.69)	1,756.8 (69.17)
Source: Agricultural Extension in South Asia
