= Rastriya Prajatantra Party Nepal =

Rastriya Prajatantra Party Nepal राष्ट्रिय प्रजातन्त्र पार्टी नेपाल
- Chairman: Kamal Thapa
- Founded: October 2006
- Dissolved: 31 December 2025 (Second iternation)
- Split from: Rastriya Prajatantra Party
- Merged into: Rastriya Prajatantra Party
- Headquarters: Kathmandu
- Student wing: National Democratic Student Organisation, Nepal
- Youth wing: National Democratic Youth Organisation, Nepal
- Women's wing: National Democratic Women Organisation Nepal
- Labour: National Democratic Trade union confederation
- Ideology: Hindu nationalism Sarva Dharma Sama Bhava; Conservatism; Economic liberalism
- Political position: Right-wing
- Colours

Election symbol
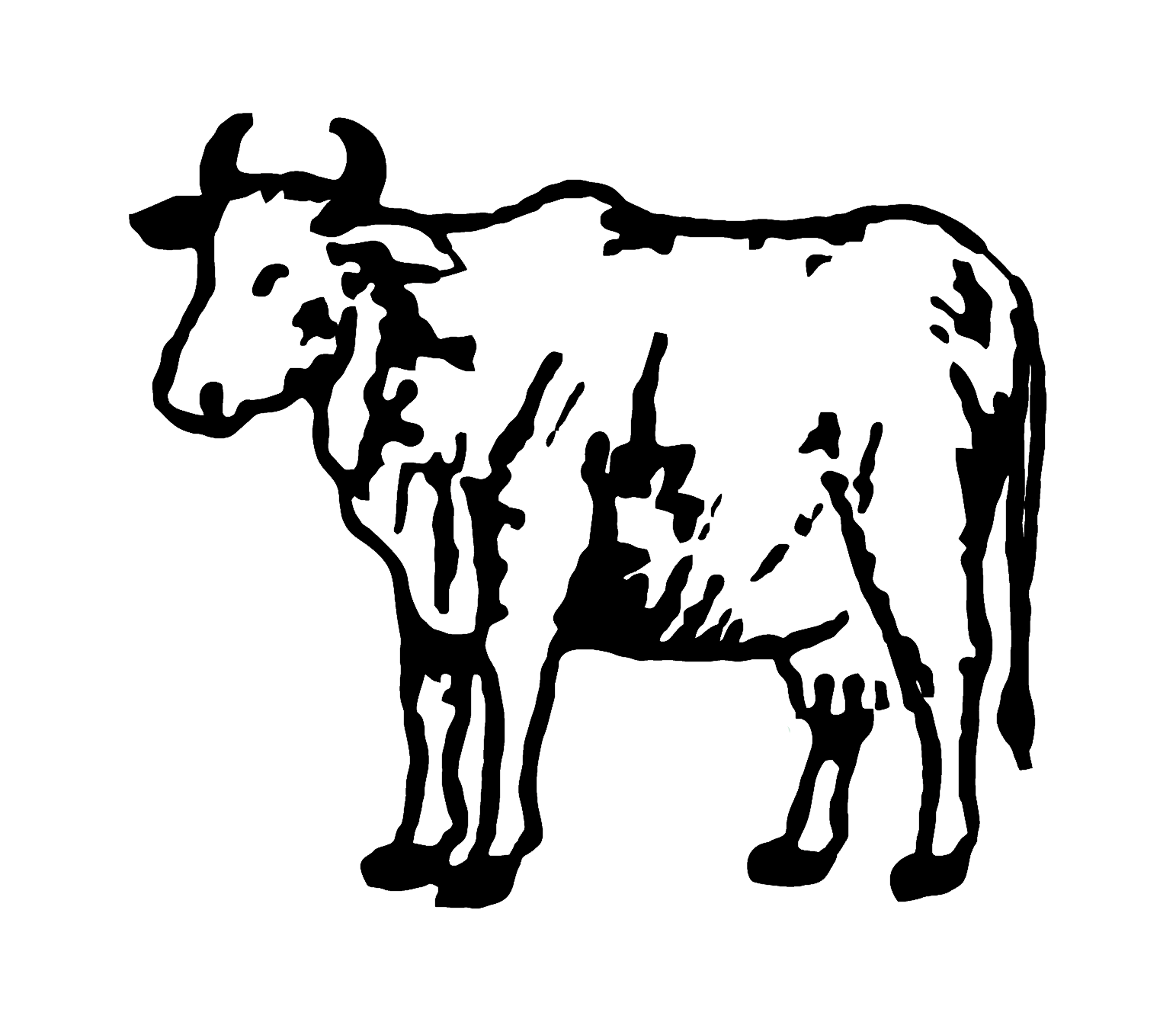

Website
- www.rpp.org.np

Rastriya Prajatantra Party, Nepal (Nepali: राष्ट्रिय प्रजातन्त्र पार्टी नेपाल; translation: National Democratic Party Nepal) is a Hindu right-wing, cultural conservative party. It previously existed as royalist political party in Nepal from 2006 to 2016. The party was formed as a splinter of Rastriya Prajatantra Party in 2006 and was later reunified in 2016. The party was reformed in 2022 by Kamal Thapa.

The party supported the restoration of the Hindu kingdom in Nepal under the Shah dynasty. Presently, the party advocates only Hindu nationalism.

The party was registered with the Election Commission of Nepal ahead of the April 2008 Constituent Assembly election for the first time. Ahead of the election, the party sought to form a front of royalist parties.

In the 2013 elections, the party had emerged as the fourth largest party in the Constituent Assembly winning 24 out of 575 seats.

== History ==
=== Founding, 2006–2008 ===
It was started as a breakaway faction of the Rastriya Prajatantra Party under leadership of Kamal Thapa, home minister under King Gyanendra's direct rule. Thapa resigned as party chair in October 2006.

RPP won the largest number of mayors in the 2006 municipal election. Rajaram Shrestha won in the capital Kathmandu; also Khadga Prasad Palungua in Dharan, Pralhad Prasad Shah Haluwai in Biratnagar, Ram Shankar Shah in Jaleswor, Sumitra Madhinne in Bhaktapur, Madhukar Prasad Adhikari in Hetauda, Bimal Prasad Shrivastav in Birgunj, Bidur Khadka in Baglung and Bhimsen Thapa in Pokhara. However this election was boycotted by most major parties.

In April 2006, the Nepal Samata Party (Socialist) merged into the party.

In January 2007 the splinter group Rastriya Prajatantra Party (Nationalist) of Rajeswor Devkota rejoined the party. Bidwai Parishad of Jit Bahadur Arjel also merged with them

On March 2, 2008, Rabindra Nath Sharma stepped down as party chairman, citing health reasons. Kamal Thapa again became chairman.

=== Constituent Assembly, 2008–2015 ===
The party won four seats in the 2008 Constituent Assembly election. At the first meeting of the Constituent Assembly on May 28, 2008, the party was the only party to oppose the declaration of a republic; there were 560 votes in favor of a republic and only the party's four votes against. Thapa subsequently said on June 20, 2008 that the country faced an impending "disaster", urging alertness among the party. He said that the party's policies and programmes would remain the same despite the political change. On July 13, 2008, he described the abolition of the monarchy as merely "an interim decision", saying that the party sought the restoration of the monarchy.

The party boycotted the July 2008 presidential election in the Constituent Assembly, on the grounds that the major parties were treating the election as a partisan contest.

In August 2008 some senior leaders, including Rabindra Nath Sharma and Rajeshwor Devkota, left the party and joined the Rastriya Prajatantra Party.

The party won 24 seats under proportional representation in the 2013 Constituent Assembly elections making it the fourth largest party in the house. The party split following differences over naming candidates to the proportional representation seats won by the party. Central leaders of the party including former minister Tanka Dhakal and former Kathmandu mayoral candidate Rajaram Shrestha registered a new party the 'Nepali Rastriya Prajatantra Party' at the Election Commission on 30 December 2013. However, the Election Commission turned down the breakaway group's request seeking recognition as a new party and claim of proportional representation seats. Tanka Dhakal later announced his return to the party stating "Splitting the party at this moment is not in our interest. It will weaken democracy" Other dissidents leaders said it was Chairman Kamal Thapa's "concession on monarchy and Hindu state" that precipitated the split.

=== Unification, 2015–2016 ===
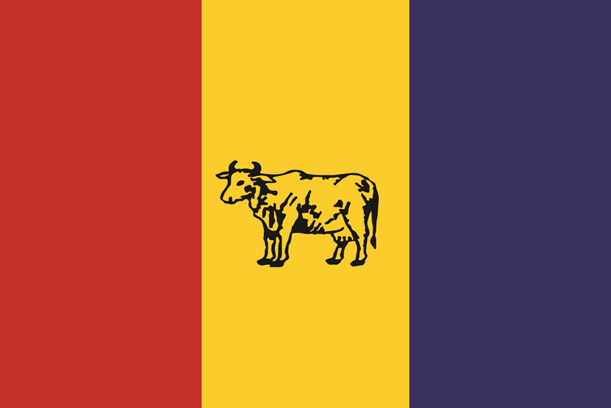
Party flag prior to unification

Party election symbol prior to unification

When the party joined the government of Khadga Prasad Oli, Bikram Bahadur Thapa and Kunti Devi Shahi became state ministers.

On 21 November 2016, Rastriya Prajatantra Party Nepal and Rastriya Prajtantra Party announced their unification. The new party retained the name of Rastriya Prajatantra Party. The new party had a total strength of 37 in the Parliament of Nepal becoming the fourth largest party. Kamal Thapa was elected chairman of the party in a special general convention in Kathmandu in February 2017.

=== Revival, 2022–2025 ===
On 13 February 2022, Kamal Thapa who had prior made a declaration of leaving Rastriya Prajatantra Party made a press release about joining the Rastriya Prajatantra Party Nepal soon as the national president of the party. After the revival, the party left the agenda of Constitutional monarchy which the party had taken as its ideology for a long period. The main agenda of the new party remains Hindu nationalism or Hindutva.

== 2025 Gen Z uprising and reunification ==
Following a shift in Nepal's political landscape triggered by a youth-led "Gen Z" uprising in September 2025 and impending parliamentary elections, the two major pro-monarchy forces intensified efforts to consolidate their base. On 27 November 2025, the Rajendra Lingden-led Rastriya Prajatantra Party (RPP) formed a dialogue committee—composed of senior leaders Buddhiman Tamang, Bikram Pandey, and Dhruba Bahadur Pradhan—to pursue alliances with like-minded nationalist groups. This prompted corresponding merger talks from the Kamal Thapa-led Rastriya Prajatantra Party Nepal (RPP-Nepal). On 24 December 2025, Lingden and Thapa signed an initial unity agreement at the RPP central office in Dhumbarahi, culminating in a formal joint declaration of reunification on 31 December 2025. This merger effectively reversed a 2021 schism where Thapa had walked out to revive RPP-Nepal after losing the party chairmanship to Lingden.

== Electoral performance ==
Election	Leader	Votes		Seats	Position	Resulting government
2008	Kamal Thapa	110,519	1.03	4 / 275	12th	CPN (Maoist)–CPN (UML)–MJFN
2013	Kamal Thapa	630,697	6.66	24 / 275	4th	Congress–CPN (UML)–RPP
