= Nepal Samata Party (Socialist) =

Political party in Nepal

Nepal Samata Party (Socialist) was a small pro-monarchy political party in Nepal. Its president was Dayananda Thapa (previously vice-chairman of Nepal Samata Party).

On April 5, 2006, the party merged with the Rashtriya Prajantantra Party (Kamal Thapa), at a function in Lalitpur.
