= Rupchandra Bista =

Nepali politician

Rupchandra Bista (Nepali: रुपचन्द्र विष्ट; 9 January 1934 – 21 June 1999), better known as Rudane (Nepali: रुदाने), was a Nepalese politician, philosopher and activist.

He was born on 9 January 1934 in Palung, Makwanpur District. In the 1970s, Bista started his Thaha movement to spread knowledge to the people of Nepal. He was a member of the Rastriya Panchayat.

Bista died on 21 June 1999. An upcoming biographical film, Rudane is based on his life, and Divya Dev plays the role of Rupchandra Bista. In 2014, the Government of Nepal named a local municipality Thaha Municipality after his movement name.
