= Indra Bahadur Khatri =

Nepali politician

Personal details
- Party: Rashtriya Prajatantra Party (Chand)

Indra Bahadur Khatri is a Nepalese politician. He contested the 1999 legislative election in the Kanchanpur-3 constituency on behalf of the Rashtriya Prajatantra Party (Chand). Khatri came second, with 8336 votes.
