= Palung =

Palung पालुङ्ग
- Location in Nepal
- Coordinates: 27.65°N 85.07°E
- Country: Nepal
- Pradesh: Bagmati Province
- District: Makwanpur
- Area: Thaha Municipality

Government
  - Mayor: Lav Sher Bista

Population (2011)
  - Total: 5,603
- Male Population: 2,619; Female Population: 2,984
- Time zone: UTC+5:45 (Nepal Time)
- Postal Code: 44110
- Area code: 057

Palung (पालुङ्ग) is an ancient village development committee (Nepal) in Thaha Municipality in Makwanpur District in the Bagmati Province of Nepal. At the time of the 2011 Nepal census it had a population of 5,603 people living in 1,236 individual households.

== Media ==
To Promote local culture and development Palung has two FM radio stations namely Radio Palung 107.2 MHz, is a community radio station and Radio Aawaj 88.8 MHz is a private radio station. The former is the first community radio station of Makwanpur district. In addition to electronic media, Shantipur daily newspaper and weekly newspaper Bikash Kharpatrika and Thaha Darshan are in publication.

=== Education ===
Palung, now Thaha municipality is one of the leading education center in northern part of Makwanpur district. This is enriched with Palung multiple campus, Janakalyan Higher Secondary School, Bajrabarahi Higher Secondary School, Jhamkeshwori Secondary School, Matsyanarayan Secondary School and Sunaula Secondary School providing higher-level education from government sector whereas Himalayan English Boarding School, Palung Modern Secondary School, Palung English School, Palung Valley Heart Academy providing secondary level education as private institutions.
