= Prithvi Raj Abasthi =

Nepalese politician

Personal details
- Party: CPN (UML)

Prithvi Raj Awashti (Nepali: पृथ्वीराज अवस्थी) is a Nepalese politician, belonging to the Communist Party of Nepal (Unified Marxist-Leninist). He contested the Baitadi-1 constituency as a CPN (UML) candidate in the 1999 legislative election and the 1994 election. He finished in second place both times.
