= 1986 Nepalese general election =

- 12 May 1986

112 of the 140 seats in the Rastriya Panchayat 57 seats needed for a majority

General elections were held in Nepal on 12 May 1986 to elect members of the Rastriya Panchayat. As political parties were banned at the time, all 1,548 candidates ran as independents. Voter turnout was 60%.

== Results ==
Party	Votes	%	Seats
Independents	5,197,953	100.00	112
Appointees			28
Total	5,197,953	100.00	140
Valid votes	5,197,953	95.28	
Invalid/blank votes	257,719	4.72	
Total votes	5,455,672	100.00	
Registered voters/turnout	9,044,966	60.32	
Source: Nohlen et al. IPU

== See also ==
- 3rd Rastriya Panchayat
