= Narendra Bahadur Bum =

Nepalese politician

Narendra Bahadur Bam

Member of Parliament, Pratinidhi Sabha
- In office 28 April 2006 – 16 January 2008
- Preceded by: Himself (2002)
- Succeeded by: Narendra Bahadur Kunwor (as Member of the Constituent Assembly)
- Constituency: Baitadi 1
- In office 23 June 1999 – 22 May 2002
- Preceded by: Keshav Bahadur Chand
- Succeeded by: Himself (2006)
- Constituency: Baitadi 1
- In office 20 June 1991 – 11 July 1994
- Preceded by: Constituency established
- Succeeded by: Constituency abolished
- Constituency: Baitadi 3

Personal details
- Party: Nepali Congress
- Other political affiliations: Nepali Congress (Democratic)

Narendra Bahadur Bam (Nepali: नरेन्द्र बहादुर बम)is a Nepalese politician. He was elected to the Pratinidhi Sabha in the 1999 election on behalf of the Nepali Congress. Bam was the NC candidate in the Baitadi-1 constituency for the 2008 Constituent Assembly election.
