= Bajrabarahi =

Bajrabarahi बज्रवाराही
- Municipality (Nepal)
- Location in Nepal
- Coordinates: 27.66°N 85.12°E
- Country: Nepal
- Province: Bagmati Province
- District: Lalitpur District
- Municipality: Godawari Municipality

Population (2010)
  - Total: 8,821
- Time zone: UTC+5:45 (NST)

Bajrabarahi lies in Godawari Municipality of Lalitpur District in the Bagmati Province of Nepal. As of 2010 it had a population of 8821.

Bajrabarahi is named after the Goddess Bajrabarahi (Devi). There is an ancient and old temple of Goddess Bajrabarahi and the locals celebrate a massive Jatra / festival on Baishakh purnima in every 3 years.

Bajrabarahi is historically important because of historical Gopali village (Kunchhal), manuscript of King Amshubarma etc.

It is also known as Tistung, Bajrabarahi because the name "Tistung" is popular and wide known to many from the time when Nepal's first highway - Tribhuwan Highway connecting Nepal to India, came into use.

Bajrabarahi is famous for its off season vegetable that are sold in major markets all over the country. Bajrabarahi exports its agricultural products to Kathmandu, Hetauda, Pokhara, Narayanghat, Butwal, Birjung and Bhaktapur and to India as well.

According to One Village One Product program of the government of Nepal, Bajrabarahi is leading and setting an example for Kiwifruit farming in Lalitpur district. Bajrabarahi exports around 4500 tons of potatoes, 3600 tons of cauliflowers, and 12 tons of kiwifruit annually.

Bajrabarahi is conveniently near to other major tourist destinations such as Daman, Chitlang, and Kulekhani. the place brings thousands of domestic as well as international tourists.

Tourism infrastructures are being developed slowly. The highway from Kathmandu/Hetauda to Bajrabarahi is black topped and well maintained and there is a full-fledged resort called Om Adhyay Retreat, with the facilities of lodging, varieties of fooding options, entertainment and refreshment activities like, boating in Kulekhani, hiking, jungle safari, village tour, sightseeing, agro-activities etc., opened and operated by the locals.
