= Nagendra Prasad Rijal =

Former Prime Minister of Nepal

- नगेन्द्रप्रसाद रिजाल

Prime Minister of Nepal
- In office 21 March 1986 – 18 June 1986
- Monarch: Birendra
- Preceded by: Lokendra Bahadur Chand
- Succeeded by: Marich Man Singh Shrestha
- In office 16 July 1973 – 1 December 1975
- Monarch: Birendra
- Preceded by: Kirti Nidhi Bista
- Succeeded by: Tulsi Giri

6th Speaker of the Rastriya Panchayat
- In office 1972–1973
- Monarch: Birendra
- Preceded by: Rajeshwor Devkota
- Succeeded by: Ram Hari Sharma
- In office 1967–1970
- Monarch: Birendra
- Preceded by: Rajeshwor Devkota
- Succeeded by: Rajeshwor Devkota

Personal details
- Born: 20 April 1927 Telia, Dhankuta, Nepal
- Died: 23 September 1994 (aged 67)
- Spouse: Asalata Devi Rijal
- Children: Kulchandra Prasad Rijal Rajendra Prasad Rijal Janak Prasad Rijal Devendra Prasad Rijal
- Education: Benares Hindu University

Nagendra Prasad Rijal (Nepali: नगेन्द्रप्रसाद रिजाल; 20 April 1927 – 23 September 1994) was the Prime Minister of Nepal from 16 July 1973 to 1 December 1975, and again from 21 March 1986 to 18 June 1986. He served also as the speaker of Rastriya Panchayat. He was born in Chungmang, Nepal, in Dhankuta District of Nepal.

Political offices
Preceded by Kirti Nidhi Bista	Prime Minister of Nepal; 1973 – 1975	Succeeded by Tulsi Giri
Preceded by Lokendra Bahadur Chand	Prime Minister of Nepal; 1986	Succeeded by Marich Man Singh Shrestha
