= Marich Man Singh Shrestha =

Former Prime Minister of Nepal

- मरिचमान सिंह श्रेष्ठ
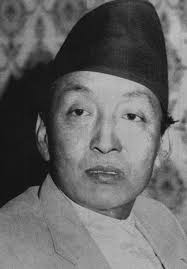

Prime Minister of Nepal
- In office 15 June 1986 – 6 April 1990
- Monarch: Birendra
- Preceded by: Nagendra Prasad Rijal
- Succeeded by: Lokendra Bahadur Chand

Personal details
- Born: 1 January 1942 Khalanga Bazar, Salyan District, Nepal
- Died: 15 August 2013 (aged 71) Kathmandu, Nepal
- Party: Independent
- Spouse: Bishnu Devi Shrestha
- Children: Anil, Sanjaya, Rashmi, Ranjan

Marich Man Singh Shrestha (Nepali: मरिचमान सिंह श्रेष्ठ; 1 January 1942 – 15 August 2013) was a Nepali politician and former Prime Minister of Nepal. He was born in 1942 in Khalanga Bazar, Salyan, Nepal. He served as the Prime Minister of Nepal from 15 June 1986 to 6 April 1990, and is remembered as the last Prime Minister of the Panchayat period and the Prime Minister during the 1989 Indian economic blockade on Nepal. Prior to that, he was the speaker of the Rastriya Panchayat from 1981 to 1985. He is one of the only two non-Khas Prime Ministers of Nepal, both the exceptions having been Newar Shresthas. He is the first Newar to have assumed the full title of the Prime Minister of Nepal, second if Gehendra Bahadur Rajbhandari, who was acknowledged as an Acting Prime Minister, is counted.

== Political career ==
In his office, he braved the sixteen months long ordeal of economic blockade (March 23, 1989) imposed on Nepal by India. When this blockade caused immense fuel scarcity in the country, he is credited for not bowing to foreign power by bringing in fuel to support the entire country via aeroplanes and delivering it to individual households. He was responsible for the mass suppression of democratic forces during the Mass Movement of 2046 BS (1989 AD) and this act highly degraded his status. He was dismissed by the King Birendra during political tensions in which protestors called for multiparty elections. Subsequently, a draft constitution was introduced which allowed for direct elections to a bicameral parliament.

== Death ==
Shrestha was brought to the Kathmandu from New Delhi-based Medicity Hospital, where he had been undergoing treatment and was on ventilator support. He told family members that he wished to die in his own country and was air lifted to Kathmandu. Shrestha died of lung cancer at 3:00 on 15 August 2013 at Norvic Hospital, Kathmandu.

Political offices
Preceded by Nagendra Prasad Rijal	Prime Minister of Nepal; 1986 – 1990	Succeeded by Lokendra Bahadur Chand
Diplomatic posts
Preceded by Rajiv Gandhi	Chairperson of SAARC; 1987	Succeeded by Benazir Bhutto
