= Hem Bahadur Malla =

Nepali politician

Hem Bahadur Malla was a Nepalese politician. He served as a member of the National Assembly from 1965 to 1989, as Cabinet Minister of Agriculture and Land Reforms from 1981 to 1986, and as Cabinet Minister of Forest and Soil Conservation from 1986 to 1988. He belonged to the Rastriya Mahashabna Party, and was the founder and Senior Vice President of the Rashtriya Prajatantra Party (National Democratic Party) until his death.

== Political career ==
Hem Bahadur Malla first entered the political sphere in 1948 and fought his first election in 1958 as a member of the Rastriya Mahashabha party. From 1965 to 1989, he served as a National Assembly member. From 1978 to 1981, he served as a Cabinet Minister for six terms, and as Minister of Land Reform. From 1981 to 1986, he served as Cabinet Minister of Agriculture and Land Reforms, receiving 76,720 votes in the 1981 Nepalese Rastriya Panchayat election—the highest number of votes so far received for such an office.

From 1986 to 1988, Malla served as Cabinet Minister of Forest and Soil Conservation. In 1986, he scored the highest number of votes in Nepal, garnering 93,270 votes. His wife, Shree Sharda Malla received the third-highest number: 65,000 votes.

He represented his country on a number of foreign visits, including to Thailand, India, China, North Korea, Pakistan, Italy, Switzerland, France, Germany, England, and Russia. He was the only politician in Nepal to receive an alias from the people, approved by King Mahendra, for his outstanding performance and political achievement.
