= Jog Meher Shrestha =

Nepali politician (1927–2009)

Personal details
- Born: 1924 or 1925
- Died: 6 December 2009 (aged 84)
- Party: Rashtriya Prajatantra Party

Jog Meher Shrestha (1924/25 – 6 December 2009) was a Nepali politician and one of the founding members of the Rastriya Prajatantra Party (RPP). He was politically active during the Panchayat period and served as minister of Home Affairs, Panchayat and Land Reforms, Health and Water Resources, Law and Justice, Education and Communication, Panchayat and Local Development and Land Reforms. Shrestha was appointed Land Reform and Management Minister leading RPP in the coalition government led by Sher Bahadur Deuba in 2004.

After the 2005 Nepal coup d'état, when democratically elected members of the country's coalition government led by the Nepali Congress were deposed, he was accused of misuse of the Prime Ministers Fund. In March 2005, he was released on bail. In June 2005, he was acquitted.

In 2006, Shrestha acted as the chairman for the RPP.

Shrestha was admitted to hospital in Lalitpur on 2 December 2009 after severe bladder pain; he died four days later on 6 December 2009, at the age of 84. His funeral took place the same day at Pashupati Aryaghat with state honours.
