= Rastriya Panchayat =

Legislature during the Panchayat regime of Nepal

Rastriya Panchayat राष्ट्रिय पञ्चायत
- Legislature of the Kingdom of Nepal

Type
- Type: Unicameral
- Sovereign: King of Nepal

History
- Founded: 16 December 1962
- Disbanded: 9 November 1990
- Preceded by: Parliament of Nepal
- Succeeded by: Parliament of Nepal
- Seats: 105 elected up to 16 nominated 112 elected 28 nominated

Elections
- Voting system: First-past-the-post
- First election: March and April 1963
- Last election: 12 May 1986

Meeting place
- Gallery Baithak, Kathmandu

Constitution
- Constitution of Nepal, 1962

The Rastriya Panchayat (Nepali: राष्ट्रिय पञ्चायत; transl. National Council) was the legislature of the Kingdom of Nepal from during the panchayat era from 1962 to 1990. Following the 1960 coup by King Mahendra, the enactment of the Constitution of 1962, made the Rastriya Panchayat the supreme legislative body in the country, replacing the Parliament of Nepal.

Under the Constitution of Nepal 1962, there were indirect elections to the Rastriya Panchayat. The 1980 referendum voted in favor of a reformed Rastriya Panchayat and consequently, members were directly elected.

The Rastriya Panchayat ceased to exist after the adoption of the Constitution of Nepal, 1990 following the 1990 revolution.

== Responsibilities ==
The Rastriya Panchayat's responsibilities were considered somewhere in between the Royal Council and a parliament. The council had the right to discuss any subject except the conduct of the monarchy, actions of Supreme Court judges and any outstanding legal cases. The Rastriya Panchayat had legislative powers but the king had unchangeable veto powers under the Panchayat system. It also did not have the power to bring any legislation pertaining to the Royal Nepal Army without the approval of the king. The prime minister and the council of ministers was also appointed by the king from amongst the member of the Rastriya Panchayat.

== Electoral system ==
The Constitution of Nepal, 1962 created a four-tier panchayat system. The constitution outlawed organized politics and banned all political parties. Consequently, the elections to the assembly followed non-partisan democratic principles.

The village and town panchayats were the base of the system with directly elected members. The local panchayats then voted for members to the district panchayat. The zonal assembly included all the members of the district panchayats in that zone who then elected members from amongst the assembly members to the Rastriya Panchayat. Various class and professional organisations also elected members to the council. The fourteen zonal assemblies elected ninety members and the central committees of five of the seven class organisations elected another fifteen to the Rastriya Panchayat. Four members were elected from among people that had completed post-secondary education. The king had the right to nominate members up to fifteen percent of the total elected members. The members elected from the zonal assembly had a term of six years and the members elected by the organisations and nominated members had a term of four years. A 1968 amendment to the constitution added staggered terms for members elected by zonal assemblies, so that one-third of the members were elected every two years.

Composition of the Rastriya Panchayat (1963–81)
Elected by	Members
Zonal Assemblies	90
Peasants' Organisation	4
Youth Organisation	4
Women's Organisation	3
Ex-Servicemen's Organisation	2
Workers' Organisation	2
Graduates' Constituency	4
Nominated by the King	16

After the 1980 referendum, the elections to the Rastriya Panchayat were reformed. Members were elected through direct voting with 40 two-member districts and 35 single member districts. The King nominated 28 members to the council.

== Chair ==
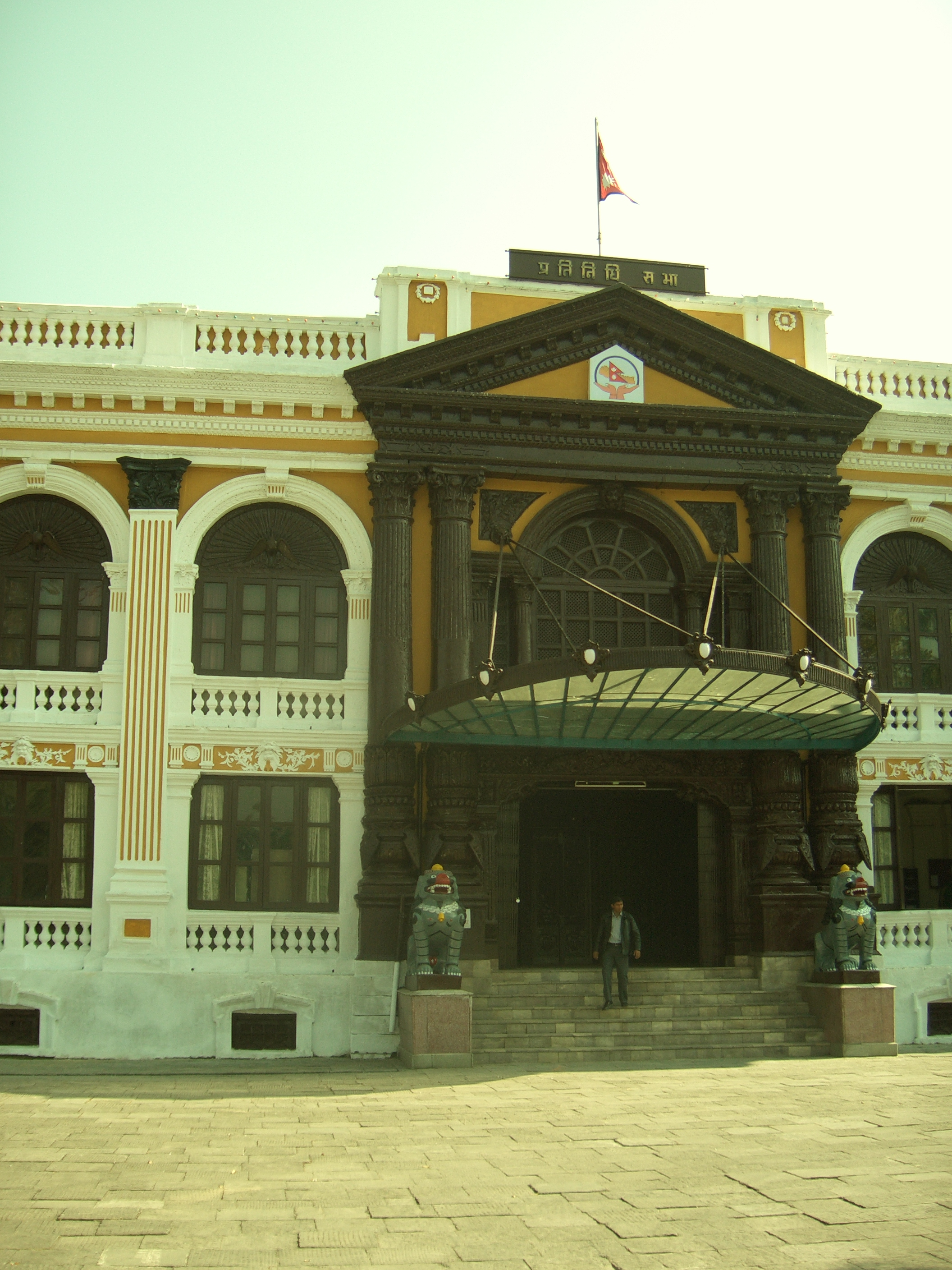
Gallery Baithak, the meeting place of the Rastriya Panchayat

The chair and vice-chair of the Rastriya Panchayat were appointed by the King on the recommendation of the Rastriya Panchayat from among its members for two year terms.

No.	Name	Took office	Left office	Time in office
1	Bishwa Bandhu Thapa	19 April 1963	5 July 1964	1 year, 77 days
2	Rajeshwor Devkota	9 July 1964	14 April 1965	279 days
2	Rajeshwor Devkota	19 April 1965	27 March 1967	1 year, 342 days
3	Nagendra Prasad Rijal	11 June 1967	13 April 1968	307 days
4	Lalit Chand	28 June 1968	14 April 1970	1 year, 290 days
5	Ram Hari Sharma	26 June 1970	14 April 1971	292 days
6	Rajeshwor Devkota	27 June 1971	9 March 1972	256 days
7	Nagendra Prasad Rijal	19 June 1972	16 July 1973	1 year, 27 days
(Acting)	Dambar Bahadur Basnet	16 July 1973	10 February 1974	209 days
8	Nain Bahadur Swar	10 February 1974	13 April 1976	2 years, 63 days
9	Ram Hari Sharma	17 June 1976	13 June 1980	3 years, 362 days
(Acting)	Matrika Prasad Koirala	17 June 1980	18 June 1980	1 day
10	Lokendra Bahadur Chand	18 June 1980	1981	9 months
Chair of the Reformed Rastriya Panchayat
11	Marich Man Singh Shrestha	12 June 1981	29 March 1986	4 years, 290 days
(Acting)	Drona Shamsher J.B.R.	8 June 1986	11 June 1986	3 days
13	Nava Raj Subedi	11 June 1986	16 April 1990	3 years, 309 days

The chair and the vice-chair were supported by a twenty one member Steering Committee which advised with regard to proper conduct of business and other matters related to the Rastriya Panchayat.

== See also ==
- List of members elected in the 1981 Nepalese general election
- List of members elected in the 1986 Nepalese general election
