= Rajeshwor Devkota =

Nepali politician

5th Speaker of the Rastriya Panchayat
- In office 1964–1967
- Preceded by: Bishwa Bandhu Thapa
- Succeeded by: Nagendra Prasad Rijal
- In office 1970–1972
- Preceded by: Nagendra Prasad Rijal
- Succeeded by: Nagendra Prasad Rijal

Personal details
- Party: Rastriya Prajatantra Party

Rajeshwor Devkota (Nepali: राजेश्वर देवकोटा; 8 October 1929 – 10 August 2015) was a Nepalese politician and writer. He was elected into the National Panchayat for several terms and has also served as the speaker, and as minister for education and land reforms. He received the Madan Puraskar and the Sajha Purasakar literary awards.
