= Lokendra Bahadur Chand =

27th Prime Minister of Nepal

- लोकेन्द्र बहादुर चन्द
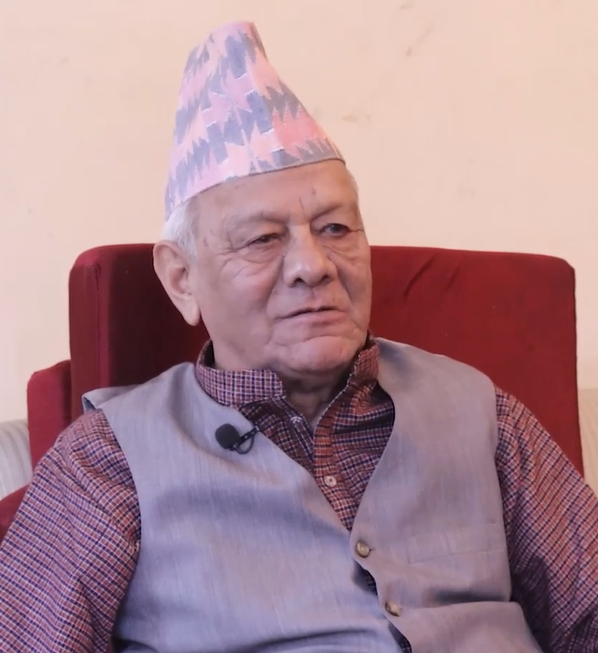
- Chand in 2022

Prime Minister of Nepal
- In office 11 October 2002 – 5 June 2003
- Monarch: Gyanendra
- Preceded by: Sher Bahadur Deuba (Note: King Gyanendra ruled the country directly from 4 October 2002)
- Succeeded by: Surya Bahadur Thapa
- In office 12 March 1997 – 7 October 1997
- Monarch: Birendra
- Preceded by: Sher Bahadur Deuba
- Succeeded by: Surya Bahadur Thapa
- In office 6 April 1990 – 19 April 1990
- Monarch: Birendra
- Preceded by: Marich Man Singh Shrestha
- Succeeded by: Krishna Prasad Bhattarai
- In office 12 July 1983 – 21 March 1986
- Monarch: Birendra
- Preceded by: Surya Bahadur Thapa
- Succeeded by: Nagendra Prasad Rijal

Member of the Constituent Assembly
- In office 28 May 2008 – 28 May 2012
- Constituency: Party list (Rastriya Prajatantra Party)

Member of the House of Representatives
- In office 14 December 1994 – 15 January 1999
- Preceded by: Binayadhoj Chand
- Succeeded by: Binayadhoj Chand
- Constituency: Baitadi 2

Personal details
- Born: 15 February 1940 (age 86) Kurkutiya Village, Baitadi District, Nepal
- Party: Rashtriya Prajatantra Party

Lokendra Bahadur Chand (Nepali: लोकेन्द्र बहादुर चन्द; born 15 February 1940) is a Nepali politician who served as the 27th prime minister of Nepal four times: from 1983 to 1986, briefly during April 1990, briefly during 1997 and from October 2002 until June 2003. He is also involved in literature and have won a Madan Puraskar for his book Bisarjan in 2054 B.S.

== Biography ==
Chand was born in Kurkutiya Village, Baitadi District, Nepal in 1940. He is a major supporter of the Nepalese monarchy. He served as the speaker of Rastriya Panchayat. During his first two terms as prime minister, he did not belong to any political party, but by 1997 he was a member of his current political party, the conservative Rashtriya Prajatantra Party (RPP). He became Prime Minister on 11 October 2002, a week after the king launched a coup against the Nepali Congress government of Sher Bahadur Deuba. Chand was the head of the 2002 cabinet. Chand was forced to resign in 2003 after massive protests and an intensification of the civil war with Maoist rebels.

Ahead of the 2008 Constituent Assembly election, Chand was the top candidate of RPP for the closed proportional representation list.

He has four sons and three daughters. His son Jayant Chand is in politics and became Minister twice and is active in his father's party.

== Notes ==
Political offices
Preceded by Surya Bahadur Thapa	Prime Minister of Nepal; 1983 – 1986	Succeeded by Nagendra Prasad Rijal
Preceded by Marich Man Singh Shrestha	Prime Minister of Nepal; 1990	Succeeded by Krishna Prasad Bhattarai
Preceded by Sher Bahadur Deuba	Prime Minister of Nepal; 1997	Succeeded by Surya Bahadur Thapa
Preceded by Gyanendra Bir Bikram Shah	Prime Minister of Nepal; 2002 – 2003	Succeeded by Surya Bahadur Thapa
