= Nepal in World War II =

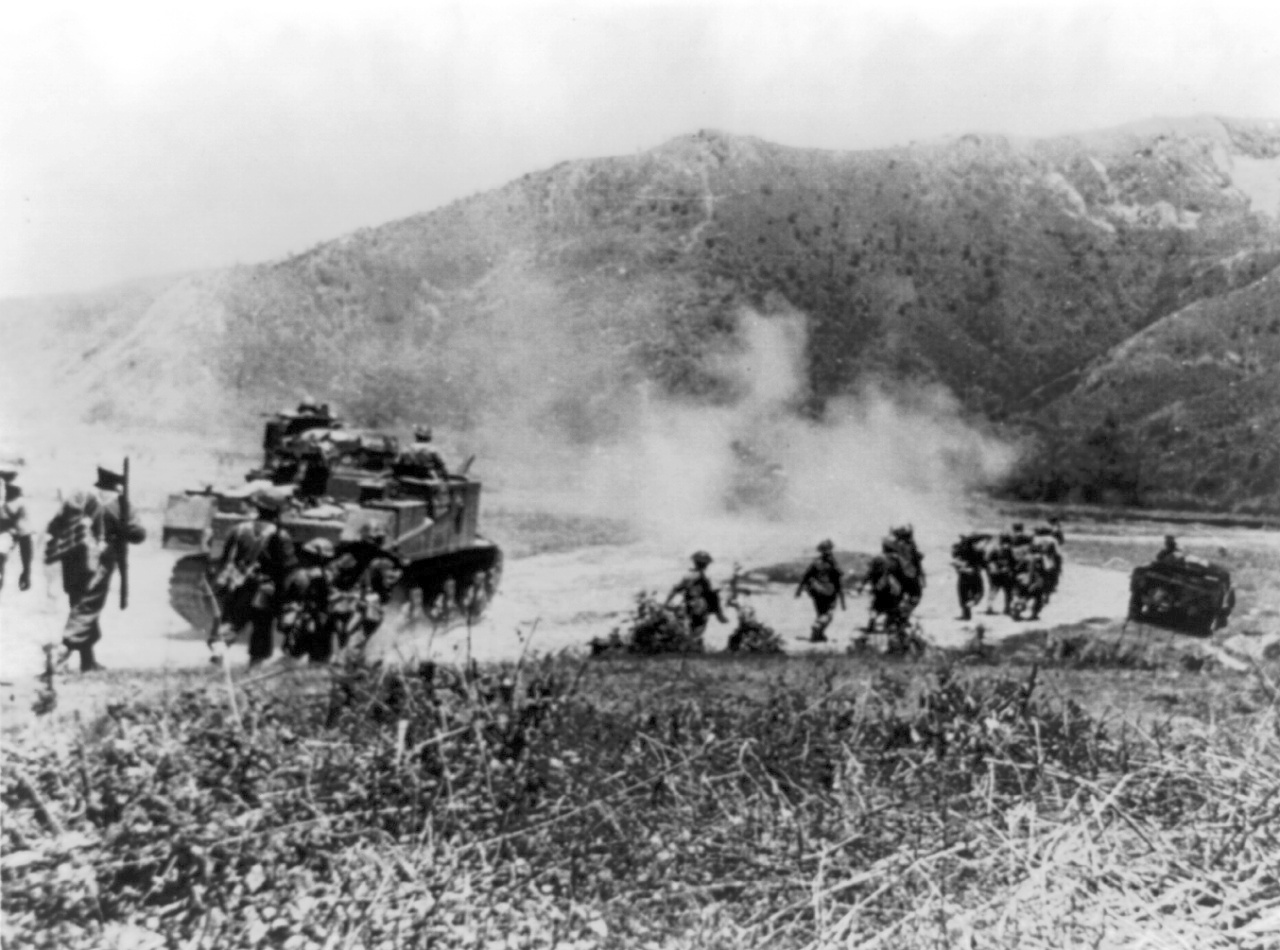
Gurkhas advancing with tanks to clear the Japanese force from Imphal-Kohima road in Burma

During World War II, the Kingdom of Nepal, then ruled by prime ministers of the Rana dynasty, gave military support to the United Kingdom. Before the outbreak of war, Prime Minister Juddha Shumsher Rana offered Britain 8,000 Nepalese troops for garrison duty in India; the offer was accepted when war was declared in September 1939. Units of the Nepalese Army were sent to British India from 1940 for internal security duties and for operations on the North-West Frontier, and a Nepalese brigade later fought in the Burma campaign. Nepal also allowed a large expansion of Gurkha recruitment for the British Indian Army, whose Gurkha regiments grew to the equivalent of an estimated 55 battalions and fought in Syria, the Western Desert, Italy, Greece, Malaya and Burma.

During the war the Rana government suppressed domestic opposition, executing four men in 1941 after arrests that followed a Praja Parishad pamphlet campaign, while the British took measures to strengthen Juddha's position. All Nepalese troops had returned home by 28 October 1945, which was celebrated in Kathmandu as Victory Day. After the war the war-raised Gurkha battalions were disbanded, and in 1947 the Gurkha regiments were divided between the British and Indian armies. Rana rule ended in 1951.

== Background ==
From 1846 Nepal was an autocracy headed by prime ministers from the Rana dynasty, under whom the kings were reduced to figureheads. The Ranas and the British in India each had a heavy stake in the maintenance of the other's rule, since the Indian nationalist movement threatened both. British support was indispensable to the Ranas in meeting internal challenges, while the British valued a strong and obliging Rana regime as essential to the security of India and as the guarantor of the supply of Gurkha soldiers to the Indian Army. The Ranas regarded Gurkha recruitment as essential to Nepal's economy and valued it as a lever for extracting concessions and personal favors from the British.

By 1908 the Gurkha brigade of the Indian Army had reached a permanent establishment of 20 battalions in ten rifle regiments. During the First World War, Prime Minister Chandra Shumsher lent Nepalese troops to garrison the North-West Frontier and helped the British recruit Gurkhas; 200,000 men were taken out of Nepal during the war, 55,000 of whom enlisted in the regular Gurkha battalions of the Indian Army. Convinced of the importance of a friendly Nepal after the war, Britain gave the Nepalese government an annual subsidy of ten lakh rupees from 1920, and in 1923 concluded a treaty recognizing Nepal's internal and external independence and its right to procure arms and ammunition freely. The treaty included an article committing the two governments to maintaining each other's security against subversive elements. Gurkha recruitment continued satisfactorily between the world wars.

Juddha Shumsher became prime minister in 1932. Opposition to Rana rule was meanwhile growing in Kathmandu. In 1931 a group of young men conspired to replace the regime with a parliamentary government, a similar conspiracy was nipped in the bud in 1933, and in the mid-1930s a political party, the Praja Parishad, was formed.

== Military contribution ==
=== Nepalese Army Contingent ===
In early 1940 Juddha sent eight battalions of the Nepalese Army to India, commanded by two of his sons, mostly for service on the frontier to release regular troops. He bade the first contingent a formal farewell at Tundikhel in Kathmandu on 5 March 1940, and the force left for India under the command of General Bahadur Shumsher Rana. The eight units were sent for internal security duties and for operations on the North-West Frontier. Two officials, Sardar Gunjan and Subba Nirraj Rajbhandari, were assigned to document the force's operations and keep its official war diaries, which are preserved in the Central Library of the Nepal Army Headquarters.

Units deployed during the war included the Sri Nath, Kalibox, Surya Dal, Naya Gorakh, Barda Bahadur, Kali Bahadur, Mahindra Dal, Second Rifle, Bhairung, Jabbar Jung, Shumsher Dal, Sher, Devi Dutta, Bhairab Nath, Jagannath and Purano Gorakh.

On 1 January 1941 men of the Second Rifles at Kohat, in the North-West Frontier Province, objected to being issued additional rations in place of cash amounting to one rupee and six annas; they refused to drink the milk bought with their increased messing allowance and demanded the money instead. In the disturbance that followed, the British Senior Special Service Officer, Colonel Briery, was struck by a stone and trampled before the district commander, Colonel Dawson, and Nepalese non-commissioned officers dispersed the crowd. The matter was settled after Bahadur Shumsher arrived on 3 January. On 18 February 1941 the ringleaders and officers of the Second Rifles were presented publicly on the parade ground at Tundikhel; the guilty officers were beaten, and Subedar Megh Bahadur Thapa was hanged.

Later a Nepalese brigade was sent to Burma and fought in the Battle of Imphal. Soldiers of the Kali Bahadur were killed in the Kohima and Imphal sectors during the Burma campaign, and other war dead included 14 soldiers of the Mahindra Dal, six of the Sher and 17 of a pioneer company. After the war several Nepalese officers received promotions and decorations for gallantry; recipients of the British Military Cross included Daya Bahadur Khand, Chutra Bahadur Thapa, Sailendra Bahadur Mahat, Gupta Bahadur Gurung, Bala Bahadur Silwal Khatri, Jagat Bahadur Khatri and Hom Bahadur Gurung.

=== Gurkhas in the Indian Army ===
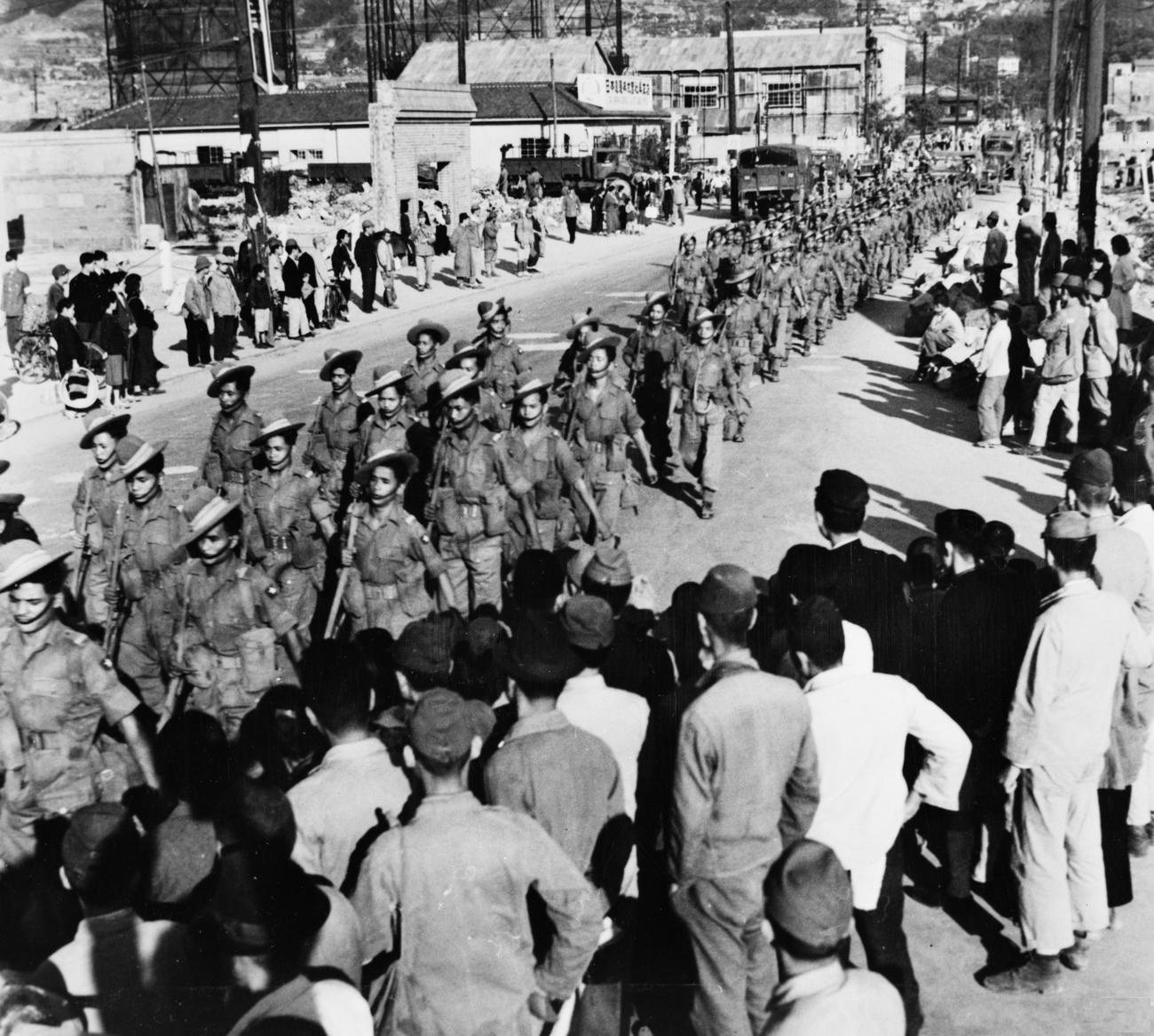
Gurkha soldiers march through Kure, Japan as part of the allied occupation force.

In 1940 Britain sought permission to recruit 7,000 Gurkhas for six new battalions in the 1940–41 recruiting season, in addition to the 3,500 recruits needed each year to maintain the existing regiments. As the first of these recruits were reporting to the depots, it asked for permission to raise ten more battalions by April 1941. Juddha agreed to both requests, and stopped all recruitment for the Nepalese Army so that the British demand could be met. Altogether 15,000 Gurkhas were recruited in the 1940 season.

In February 1943 Juddha wrote to the Commander-in-Chief in India, Archibald Wavell: "For a small hill country like ours, the supply of 65,000 recruits in the course of last three years is certainly a notable achievement." Supplying these numbers had been possible only by opening areas to recruitment that had previously been closed. The target for 1944–45 was 12,000 recruits; Juddha cautioned the British about the quality of the recruits because of the heavy recruitment, but worked to meet the target.

All ten Gurkha regiments raised third and fourth battalions, and the 1st, 2nd and 9th Gurkha Rifles also raised fifth battalions. In 1943 training battalions were formed to give recruits realistic experience of combat, and two Gurkha garrison units were added. During the war there were no fewer than 40 Gurkha battalions in British service, as well as parachute, garrison and training units, amounting in all to 112,000 men. By one estimate, the Gurkhas serving in the Indian Army by the end of the war amounted to the equivalent of some 55 battalions; some 160,000 Gurkha recruits reported to recruiting centers during the war.

Gurkhas fought alongside British and Commonwealth troops in Syria, the Western Desert, Italy and Greece, in Malaya and Singapore, and in Burma. Gurkha soldiers received the Victoria Cross for actions in Tunisia, Italy, India and Burma; the recipients included Lalbahadur Thapa, Gaje Ghale, Ganju Lama, Tulbahadur Pun, Netrabahadur Thapa, Agansing Rai, Sher Bahadur Thapa, Thaman Gurung, Bhanbhagta Gurung and Lachhiman Gurung. More than 10,000 Gurkhas are estimated to have died in the war. After the war the 2nd Battalion, 5th Royal Gurkha Rifles served with the British Commonwealth Occupation Force in Japan from 1946 to 1947, the only Gurkha unit to do so.

== Home front ==
=== Politics ===
Opposition to Rana rule grew during the war. The British Minister in Kathmandu, Colonel G. Betham, reported that social and political opposition to the regime had become a force to be reckoned with. During the Indra Jatra festival of 1940, Praja Parishad volunteers put up anti-Rana pamphlets on walls and trees in Kathmandu at night. Twenty people were arrested on 18 October 1940, and more arrests followed. The verdict was announced on 19 January 1941, and four men who had been sentenced to death were executed within ten days: Ganga Lal and Dashrath Chand were shot, and Dharma Bhakta Mathema and Shukraraj Shastri were hanged. Three of them were leaders of the Praja Parishad; Shastri, the chairman of the Civil Rights Committee (Nagarik Adhikari Samiti), had not been involved in the party's activities.

Because any political disturbance in Nepal was likely to interfere with the supply of Gurkha recruits, the British took several measures to strengthen Juddha's position. They assisted his economic projects and conferred British titles and honors on him, enforced the Defence of India Rules to suppress anti-Rana activities in India, and warned the editors of Janata and Naya Hindustan, newspapers that condemned the Rana regime. During the Quit India Movement of August 1942, the Nepalese Terai became a base for anti-Rana and anti-British activities, and the two governments carried out a joint operation there that led to the arrest of many members of the Indian National Congress.

=== Wartime restrictions ===
Juddha and other Rana rulers feared that German radio broadcasts would sway public support toward Germany, and Juddha ordered the confiscation of radio sets from all but a few trusted figures. In a report of 1940, the British envoy described Juddha's order that everyone except the Commander-in-Chief and the commanding generals hand over their receiving sets to the police. The confiscated sets were stored at Singha Durbar, and some were later returned to selected generals.

The Nepalese government also objected to foreign aircraft flying over its territory. It held that flights made without its prior permission denied Nepal's independence, and pandits in Kathmandu objected to them on religious grounds. After several overflights in April and May 1942, during one of which soldiers at a Nepalese post at Sisagarhi were about to open fire on an aircraft before their commander stopped them, the British Minister asked that airmen be warned against flying over Nepalese territory. On 10 June 1942 the External Affairs Department of the Government of India replied that pilots had been instructed not to fly over Nepal.

=== Economic and social effects ===
According to Sagar Rana, as quoted by Kuwajima, the 160,000 men who went to war came mainly from Nepal's hill communities. The soldiers sent part of their pay home to help their families, who were living in acute poverty, but the negative effects included the exodus and loss of able-bodied men from the villages and a downturn in productivity. Rathaur writes that recruitment was so heavy that "almost all the able-bodied young men had left the country".

== Aftermath ==
With the end of the war, all the war-raised Gurkha battalions were disbanded. Under a tripartite agreement concluded by Britain, India and Nepal in 1947, four of the ten Gurkha regiments went to the British Army and the other six remained part of the Indian Army. The agreement also provided that the Gurkha regiments should not be used against Nepal, other Gurkhas, Hindus or unarmed mobs.

The anti-Rana movement gained strength at the end of the war. The Ranas alleged that Britain's Labour government, which had decided to grant independence to India, was less keen to support their regime. Rana rule ended in 1951, when it was replaced by a democratic government.

The first official American visit to Nepal took place from 16 to 22 November 1945. George R. Merrell, then the US chargé d'affaires in New Delhi, presented Padma Shumsher with the Legion of Merit in recognition of the role played by Gurkha soldiers from Nepal in the British Army during the war. The United States recognized Nepal on 21 April 1947, and diplomatic relations between the two countries were established on 16 February 1948.

== See also ==
- Military history of Nepal
- Nepal–United Kingdom relations
- India in World War II
- List of Brigade of Gurkhas recipients of the Victoria Cross
