= List of wars involving Nepal =

Nepal has been involved in many wars in its history. This list describes wars involving the historical Khasa-Malla Kingdom, Gorkha Kingdom, Kingdom of Nepal, as well as modern Nepal.

== Khasa-Malla Kingdom (11th century-14th century) ==
Conflict	Nepal and Allies	Opposition	Outcome
Bengali expedition into Nepal (1349–1350)	Khasa-Malla Kingdom	Bengal Sultanate	Victory

== Gorkha Kingdom (1559–1768) ==
Conflict	Nepal and Allies	Opposition	Outcome
Battle of Nuwakot (1744)	Gorkha Kingdom	Kingdom of Kantipur	Gorkhali victory: Nuwakot captured by the Gorkhas
Battle of Makwanpur (1762)	Gorkha Kingdom	Senas of Makwanpur	Gorkhali victory
Battle of Sindhuli (1767)	Kingdom of Gorkha	East India Company; Kingdom of Kantipur	Gorkhali victory
Battle of Kirtipur (1767)	Gorkha Kingdom	Kingdom of Lalitpur	Gorkhali victory
Battle of Kathmandu (1768)	Gorkha Kingdom	Kantipur Kingdom; East India Company	Gorkhali victory: Kathmandu Valley sieged and annexed by the Gorkhalis
Battle of Lalitpur (1768)	Kingdom of Gorkha	Kingdom of Lalitpur	Gorkhali victory

== Kingdom of Nepal (1768–2008) ==
Conflict	Nepal and Allies	Opposition	Outcome
Battle of Bhaktapur (1769)	Kingdom of Nepal	Kingdom of Bhaktapur	Victory
Limbuwan Gorkha War (History of Sikkim) (1771–1776)	Kingdom of Nepal	Limbuwan	Victory
First Sino-Nepalese War (1788–1792)	Kingdom of Nepal	Qing dynasty	Victory
Second Sino-Nepalese War (1792)	Kingdom of Nepal	Qing dynasty	Stalemate
Gurkha-Sikh War (1809)	Kingdom of Nepal Supported by: Kumaon Kingdom; Garhwal Kingdom	Sikh Empire; Kangra State Supported by: Bilaspur State	Defeat
Anglo-Nepalese War (1814–1816)	Kingdom of Nepal	East India Company; Garhwal Kingdom; Patiala State Kingdom of Sikkim	Defeat
Third Nepal-Tibet War (1855–1856)	Kingdom of Nepal	Tibet under Qing rule	Victory
World War I (1914–1918)	France (British Empire) United Kingdom: Canada; Australia; New Zealand; India; South Africa; Russia; Italy; United States; Serbia; Montenegro; Belgium; Japan; Romania; Portugal; Hejaz (Republic of China (1912–1949)) China; Greece; Brazil; Kingdom of Nepal	Germany; Austria-Hungary; Ottoman Empire; Bulgaria	Victory
World War II (1939–1945)	Soviet Union; United States; United Kingdom; China; France; Free France; Poland; Yugoslavia; Greece; Republican Spain; Netherlands; Belgium; Luxembourg; Denmark; Norway; Czechoslovakia; FTM; Canada; Australia; New Zealand; India; Ceylon; British Burma; Egypt; Sudan; Nigeria; South Africa; Philippines (Ethiopian Empire) Ethiopia; Brazil; Mexico; Colombia; Cuba; Chile; Peru (Mongolian People's Republic) Mongolia; Tuva; Viet Minh; KLA Kingdom of Nepal	Germany; Japan; Italy; Vichy France; Romania (Kingdom of Hungary) Hungary; Bulgaria; Slovakia; Bohemia and Moravia; Croatia; Finland; Kingdom of Albania; German Albania; Thailand; Iraq; Azad Hind; Japanese Burma; Manchukuo; Mengjiang	Victory
Tajikistani Civil War (1992–1997)	(United Nations) UNMOT: Austria; Bangladesh; Bulgaria; Czechia; Denmark; Ghana; Hungary; Indonesia; Jordan; Kingdom of Nepal; Nigeria; Poland; Switzerland; Ukraine; Uruguay; Non-UNMOT: China; India; Kazakhstan; Kyrgyzstan; Russia; Tajikistan; Turkmenistan; Uzbekistan	United Tajik Opposition (Afghanistan) Taliban	Victory
United Nations Operation in Somalia II (1993–1995) (Part of the Somali Civil War) (1991–)	(United Nations) UNOSOM II: Algeria; Australia; Austria; Bangladesh; Belgium; Botswana; Canada; Denmark; Egypt; Fiji; Finland; France; Germany; Greece; India; Indonesia; Ireland; Italy; Kuwait; Jordan; Malaysia; Morocco; Kingdom of Nepal; New Zealand; Nigeria; Norway; Pakistan; Philippines; Romania; Saudi Arabia; South Korea; Spain; Sweden; Switzerland; Tunisia; Turkey; UAE; United Kingdom; United States; Zimbabwe	(Somalia) Somali National Alliance	Inconclusive/Other Result
Nepalese Civil War (1996–2006)	Kingdom of Nepal: Nepalese Armed Forces; Royal Nepali Army; Nepal Police; Armed Police Force	Communist Party of Nepal (Maoist): People's Liberation Army, Nepal	Comprehensive Peace Accord: Abolition of Nepalese monarchy

== See also ==
- Military history of Nepal
- Khasa-Malla Kingdom
- Gorkha Kingdom
- Gorkha Empire
- Nepal
