= Martyrs of Nepal =

List of martyrs from Nepal

Martyrs (Nepali: नेपालका सहिद; Shahid) in Nepal is a term for someone who makes contributions for the welfare of the country or society. The term was originally used for individuals who died opposing the Rana dynasty which was in place in the Kingdom of Nepal from 1846 until 1951.

Lakhan Thapa Magar is regarded as the first Martyr of Nepal.

== List of martyrs ==
Four Martyrs were martyred in 1941 after rebelling against Juddha Shamsher Jung Bahadur Rana — represented in the Shahid Gate:

- Shukraraj Shastri
- Dharma Bhakta Mathema
- Dashrath Chand
- Ganga Lal Shrestha

22 martyrs were recognised in 2016, including:

- Bhimdatta Panta
- Durgananda Jha, "first Republican martyr"
- Ratna Kumar Bantawa
- Yagya Bahadur Thapa

Others considered martyrs are:

- Bakaabir – Baldev Shahi (बाकावीर बलदेव शाही) (son of the king of Acchanm) rebelled against Janga Bahadur and died in 1906 B.S.
- Tanka Prasad Acharya was sentenced to death, but not executed on account of being a Brahmin, and was often called a "living martyr"
- Colonel Amar Bikram Shah, son of Prime Minister Chautariya Puskhar Shah was sentenced to death in Teku by the Rana Regime for his role in the attempted coup d'état in 1882. He led a posse to kill the then Prime Minister Ranodip Singh Kunwar.

== Legacy ==
- Martyrs' Day is celebrated every year on Magh 16 (January 30). Martyrs' week is Magh 10-16 (January 23–29).
- Sukraraaj Tropical and Infectious Disease Hospital, named after Shukraraj Shastri,
- Shahid Gate is a monument to the martyrs in Kathmandu. It is customary for Prime Ministers and other officials to visit the monument after taking oaths of office.
- Martyr's Memorial A-Division League is the top division of the All Nepal Football Association.
- Dashrath Stadium, Nepal's national stadium, is named after Dashrath Chand.
- Many streets and parks in the country are named after the martyrs.
