= Shahid Gate =

Monument in Kathmandu, Nepal

- शहीद गेट
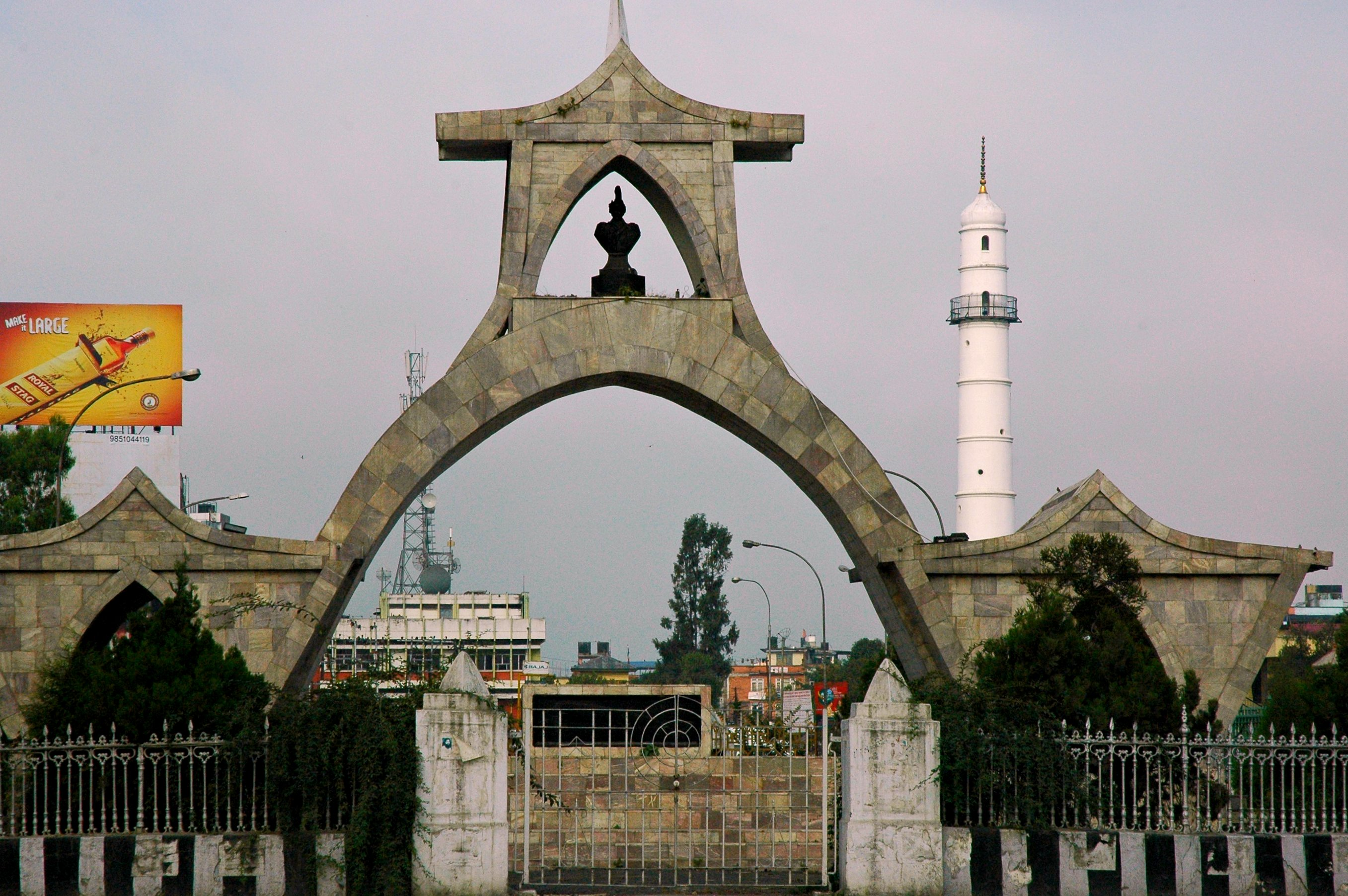
- Shahid Gate with Dharahara in the background.
- Interactive map of the Shahid Gate area
- Alternative names: Nepal Smarak

General information
- Type: Memorial arch
- Architectural style: Nepalese pagoda
- Location: Sundhara, Kathmandu
- Coordinates: 27°41′58.53″N 85°18′54.29″E
- Inaugurated: 13 April 1961; 65 years ago

Design and construction
- Architect: Shankar Nath Rimal

Sahid Gate or Shahid Gate (lit. Martyr's Gate) is a monument in Kathmandu, Nepal. The monument was inaugurated on 13 April 1961. As of 2016, there are five statues in the gate. Four men, namely Dharma Bhakta Mathema, Gangalal Shrestha, Dashrath Chand, and Shukraraj Shastri, who are considered martyrs since they stood up to the 104-year-old Rana dynasty, have their statues above their arms established here. On top of all is a statue of former King Tribhuvan, who, in B.S. 2007 (A.D. 1950) cooperated with people to introduce democracy in the country. The gate was designed by Shankar Nath Rimal. King Mahendra inaugurated the monument and named it Nepal Smarak. However, people started calling it Shahid gate, a name by which it is presently called.

In 2012, the Nepali cabinet meeting decided to move the statue of Tribhuvan from the Gate and to the Narayanhiti Museum leaving only the statues of the martyrs at the monument.

== See also ==
- Martyrs of Nepal
- Rana dynasty
