= Pahan Charhe =

Three-day festival of the Newar community in Nepal

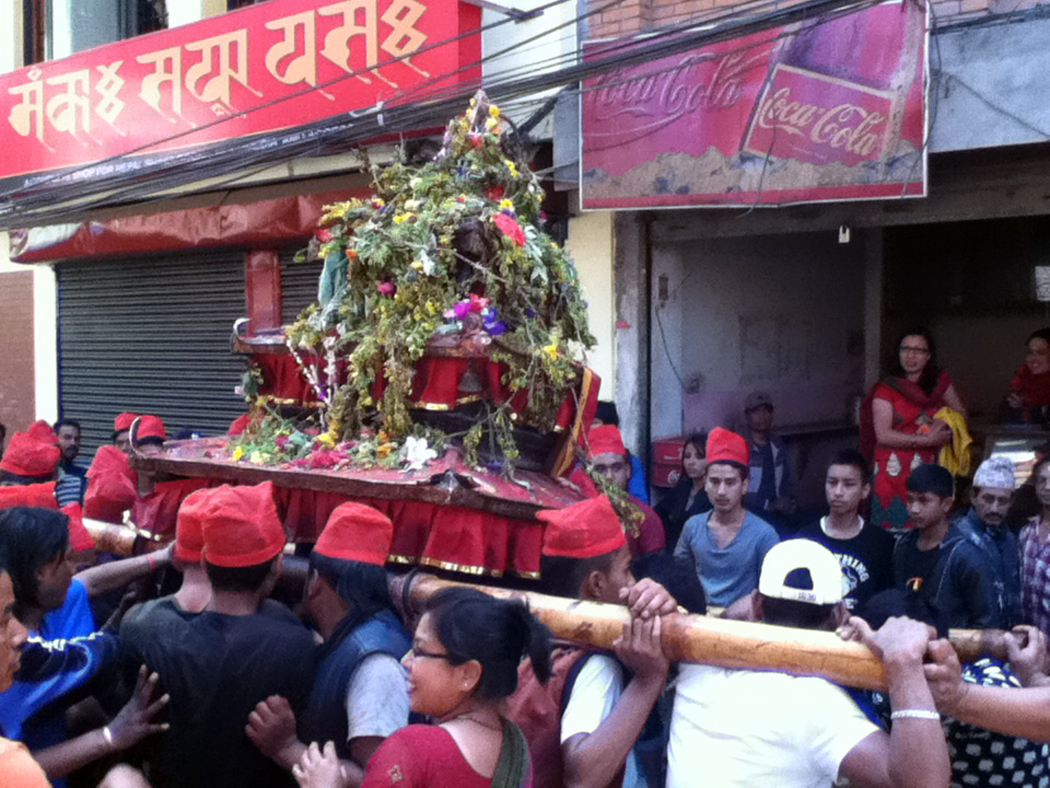
Participants carry a portable shrine on their shoulders during Pahan Charhe.

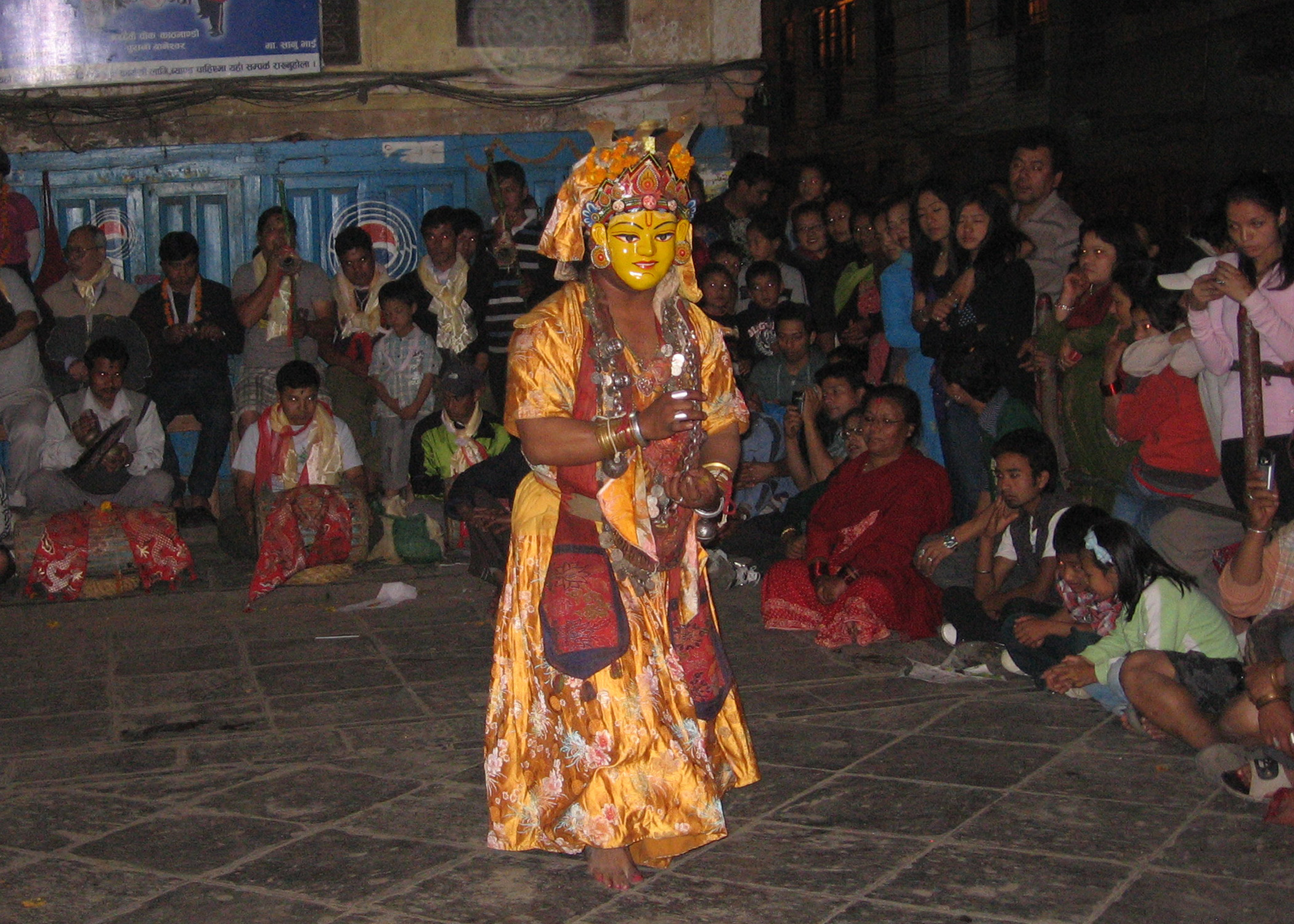
The Nyatamaru Ajima Pyakhan dance at Nyata during Pahan Charhe.

Pāhān Charhe (Devanagari: पाहां चह्रे) also known as Pāsā Charhe (पासा चह्रे) is one of the greatest religious festivals of the year in Nepal Mandala. It is celebrated with particular fervor in Kathmandu, and consists of a conglomeration of activities including parades, masked dances, horse racing and religious worship held over three days in different places.

Pahan means "guest" and pasa means "friend" in Nepal Bhasa. Charhe means "fourteenth day of the lunar fortnight" when the festival commences. It starts on the 14th day of the dark fortnight of Chillā (चिल्ला), the fifth month in the lunar Nepal Era calendar. Inviting friends and relatives to one's home and honoring them with a feast is one of the highlights of the festival. Pahan Charhe is held according to the lunar calendar, so the dates are changeable. In 2025, the festival was marked from 28-30 March.

== Day one ==
The celebrations start with the worship of the deity Luku Mahadyah (लुकु महाद्यः) in the evening. He is one of the forms of the Hindu god Shiva. Luku Mahadyah means "sunken Mahadyah", and his image is enshrined in a hole in the ground, often in a rubbish corner. Householders perform their devotions to the deity by making offerings of a feast including meat and wine. Rape blooms (लुँबुँ) and radish blooms (वहबुँ) are special offerings of the festival, and are considered to symbolize gold and silver respectively.

At Nyata in Kathmandu, sacred masked dances are shown on the stone platform at the street corner. It is known as Nyatamaru Ajimā Pyākhan or Swetkali Dance. The dance drama is performed by actors wearing masks representing various deities. The dance starts in the evening and lasts throughout the night. The historic neighborhood of Nyata is also known as Naradevi.

== Day two ==
The main event of the second day, which coincides with Ghode Jatra, the horse festival, is the Dyah Lwākegu (द्यः ल्वाकेगु) ceremony at Tundikhel parade ground in Kathmandu where portable shrines of the Ajimā mother goddesses are brought together. Ghode Jatra consists of horse races and other activities organized by the Nepal Army at Tundikhel. At Bal Kumari in the neighboring city of Lalitpur, a one-horse race is held.

Images of seven mother goddesses Lumadhi Ajimā, Kanga Ajimā, Mhaypi Ajimā, Takati Ajimā, Mayti Ajimā, Yatamaru Ajimā and Bachhalā Ajimā are installed on portable shrines and paraded in their respective localities of Kathmandu. Late at night, they are carried on the shoulders of their attendants and assembled at Tundikhel accompanied by musical bands. After all the palanquins arrive, the Dyah Lwākegu ceremony is held when the entourages accompanying them exchange flaming torches symbolizing the meeting of the goddesses. The palanquin procession of the Ajimā goddesses was started by King Amar Malla in Nepal Sambat 580 (1460).

== Day three ==
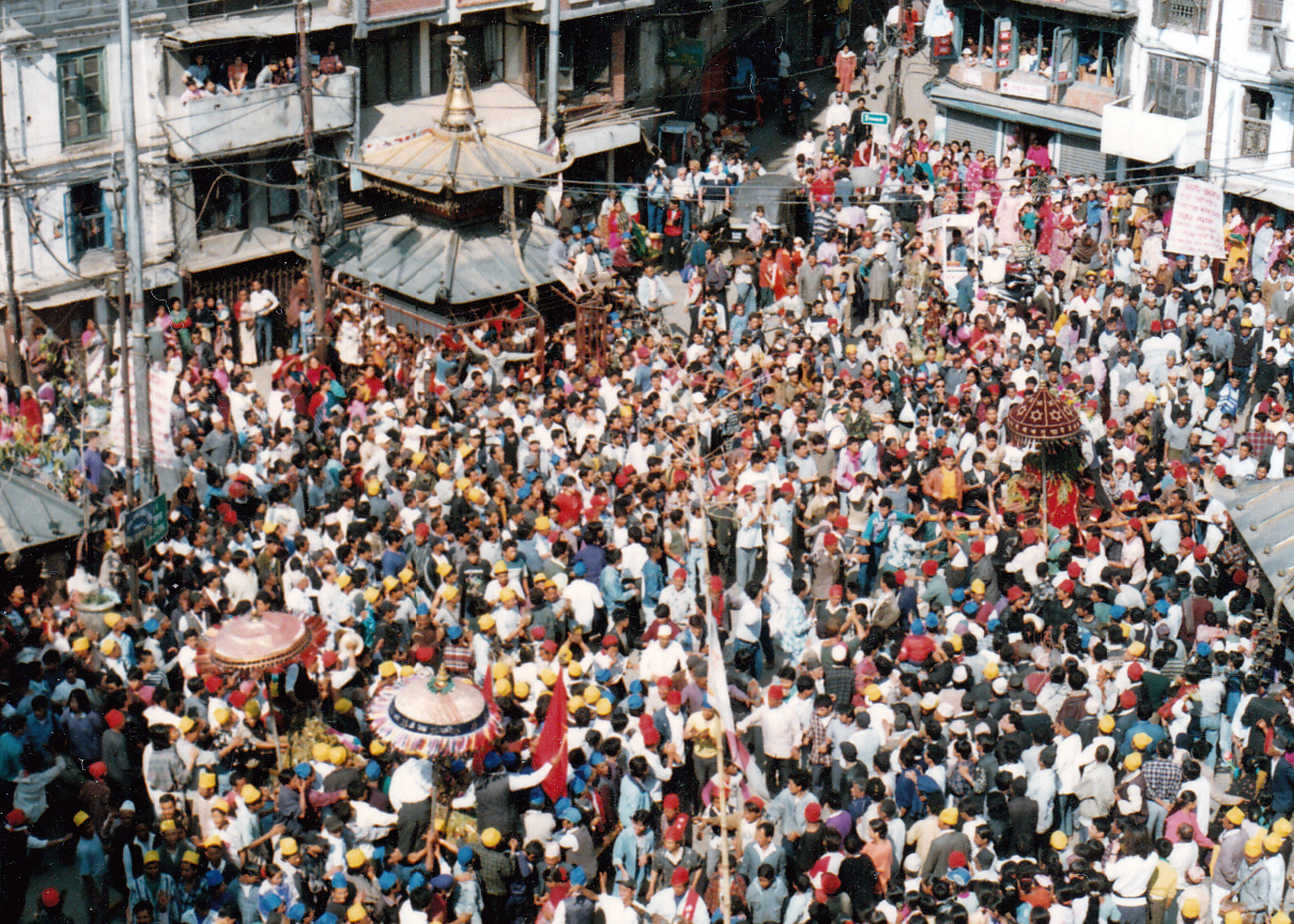
Dyah Lwakegu festival at Asan.

The concluding event is the gathering of the palanquins of three Ajimā mother goddesses Lumadhi Ajimā, Kanga Ajimā and Tebāhā Ajimā at the market square of Asan for another Dyah Lwākegu ceremony. Prior to the event, the portable shrines are paraded through the streets of Kathmandu escorted by musical bands. The palanquin bearers, musicians and followers wear red, blue and yellow caps representing their respective neighborhoods. The processions stop frequently to allow devotees to make offerings to them. When the palanquins reach Asan through various routes, the Dyah Lwākegu ceremony is held.

During the Dyah Lwākegu ceremony, participants accompanying the shrines exchange flaming torches as crowds of onlookers fill the market square. Rice flat breads known as chatānmari (चतांमरि) are scattered on the palanquins from the rooftops of houses around the square. The festival re-enacts the meeting of the three Ajimā mother goddesses who are sisters.

A seasonal song with a melancholy tune is the theme music of the Pahan Charhe celebrations. Musical bands play the song when participating in the processions of the mother goddesses. Nepalese residing abroad celebrate the festival by holding get-togethers.
