= Nepal Praja Parishad =

Nepal Praja Parishad नेपाल प्रजा परिषद
- Leader: Tanka Prasad Acharya
- Founder: Dashrath Chand and Tanka Prasad Acharya
- Founded: 2 June 1936 (first time); c. 1952 (second time)
- Dissolved: January 1941 (first time); 1961 (second time)
- Preceded by: Nepali Congress (1952)
- Succeeded by: Nepali National Congress (1947); Nepali Congress (1961)
- Headquarters: Kathmandu, Kingdom of Nepal

The Nepal Praja Parishad (Nepali: नेपाल प्रजा परिषद) was the first attempt to form an organization to lead the revolution against the Rana dynasty in Nepal. Led by Tanka Prasad Acharya, the group was founded in 1936, and is seen as the first political party in Nepal. The organisation collapsed after their plot to assassinate multiple members of the Rana regime was discovered, and some of its key members were executed.

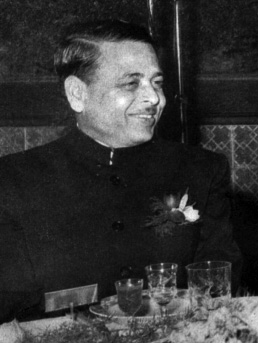
Tanka Prasad Acharya

== History ==
The idea of the Nepal Praja Parishad was proposed by Dashrath Chand and Tanka Prasad Acharya in a hotel in Bhimphedi, Makwanpur District of Nepal. Following many years of dictatorial rule from the Ranas as hereditary Prime Ministers, people in Nepal began to support their overthrow. However, that sentiment was mostly exclusive to rich high class intellectuals, with the uneducated peasantry unable and unwilling to help. The Nepal Praja Parishad was formed in 1936, after Acharya and Chand received support from other aristocrats and intellectuals. The group was led by Tanka Prasad Acharya, and the organization's head office was kept in Dharma Bhakta Mathema's house in Om Bahal, Kathmandu.

=== Anti-Rana activities ===
Initially, the Nepal Praja Parishad distributed hand-written pamphlets among the people and wrote articles against the Rana Dynasty in Nepal in an Indian socialist paper "Janata" and another paper published in Calcutta named "Advance". Later, Tanka Prasad Acharya brought a printing machine from India, and the organization started to distribute pamphlets, print articles in newspapers and draw wall posters against the Rana dynasty to enlighten the people against their rule. The Nepal Praja Parishad also later planned the assassination of multiple high ranking politicians in the Rana regime. However, they were unsuccessful in their plot, and were discovered after a member of the group informed the Rana government.

=== Dissolution ===
After the Rana government found out about the assassination plot of the Nepal Praja Parishad, Prime Minister Juddha Shumsher had the leading members of the group arrested. In 1941, senior leaders of the group Dharma Bhakta Mathema, Dashrath Chand, Gangalal Shrestha, Govinda Prasad Upadhaya and Tanka Prasad Acharya were sentenced to death, but Acharya and Upadhaya was not executed, as the Nepali law at the time forbade the killing of Brahmins. Following their execution, and Acharya's sentence changed to life imprisonment, the Nepal Praja Parishad was dissolved in January 1941. Mathema, Chand and Shrestha, along with Shukraraj Shastri, another anti-Rana intellectual who was not involved with the Praja Parishad, are now recognized as the 4 Martyrs of Nepal.

=== 1950s Reactivation ===
Following the events of the 1951 Revolution, the Ranas were removed from power and parliamentary democracy was established in Nepal. Tanka Prasad Acharya was released from prison, and had at this point been a senior member of the Nepali Congress. However, following disagreements with the Nepali Congress, Tanka Prasad Acharya and Bhadrakali Mishra, another senior politician of the Nepali Congress, split off from the party and reactivated the Nepal Praja Parishad in the 1950s. The party served in the government of Matrika Prasad Koirala in 1953, and remained a notable political party in opposition to the Nepali Congress. Tanka Prasad Acharya was even made Prime Minister by King Mahendra in 1956. However, in 1959, Acharya and Mishra contested the elections separately, and were recognized as different political parties: the Nepal Praja Parishad (Acharya) and the Nepal Praja Parishad (Mishra). Acharya's faction of the party won 2 seats in the election, whereas Mishra's faction won 1. In 1961, following King Mahendra's implementation of the Panchayat system, the party rejoined the Nepali Congress.

== Members ==
The Nepal Praja Parishad consisted of many Nepali revolutionaries of the time. The leaders of the group included Ram Hari Sharma Nepal, Dharma Bhakta Mathema, Dashrath Chand, Tanka Prasad Acharya and Gangalal Shrestha. Dharma Bhakta Mathema was also the gym instructor of King Tribhuvan, and the motives of the organization were known to and also supported by him. Other members of this organization included Chudaprasad Sharma, Govinda Prasad Upadhya(Poudyal), Puskar Nath Upreti, Mukunda Nath Rimal, Bal Bahadur Pandey, Druba Prasad Dawade, Fadindra Nath Satyal, Bhakta Bahadur Dangol (Book-Seller), Hari Krishna Shrestha, Chakra Bahadur Khatri, Ganesh Man Singh, Keshav Khatri, Ramji Shrestha, Chandraman Shrestha, and also King Jaya Prithivi Bahadur Singh of Bajhang.

== Electoral performance ==
Election	Leader	Votes	%	Seats	Position	Resulting government
1959	Bhadrakali Mishra (Note: Mishra and Acharya contested as separate groups of the Praja Parishad)	59,820	3.3	1 / 109	6th	In opposition
1959	Tanka Prasad Acharya	53,038	2.2	2 / 109	7th	In opposition

== Leadership ==
=== Prime Minister of Nepal ===
Prime Minister	Portrait	Term in Office			Cabinet
Prime Minister	Portrait	Start	End	Tenure	Cabinet
Tanka Prasad Acharya		27 January 1956	26 July 1957	1 year, 180 days	Acharya, 1956
