= Gurumapa =

Mythical creature in nepalese folklore

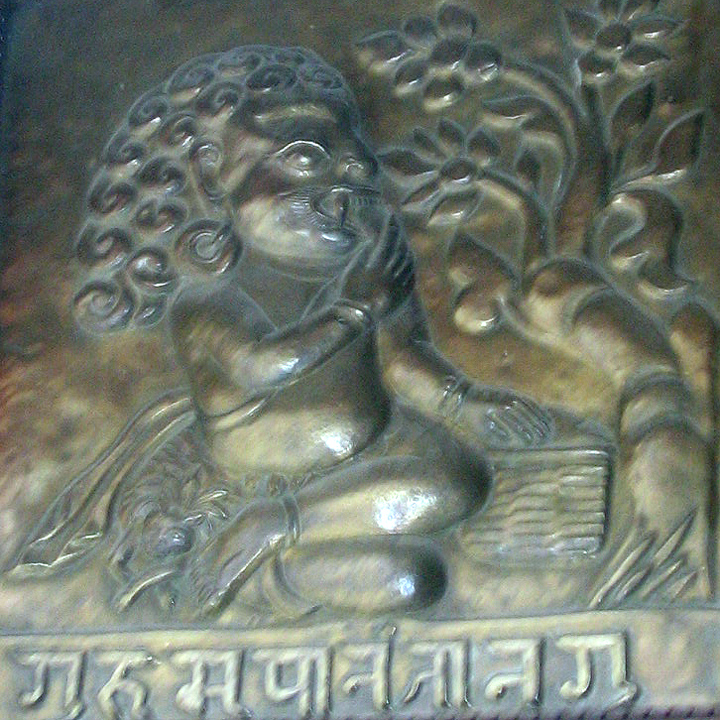
Plaque at Itum Bahal, Kathmandu. The caption reads "Gurumapa eating rice".

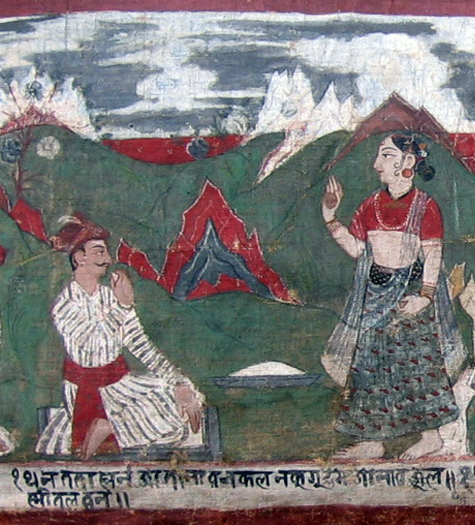
Kesh Chandra and sister from an old painting.

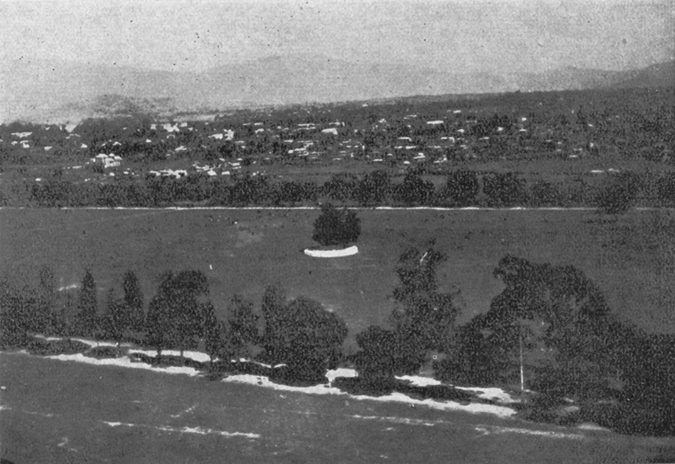
Tinkhya (Tundikhel) open field in Kathmandu, ca 1939.

Gurumāpā (Nepal Bhasa: 𑐐𑐸𑐬𑐸𑐩𑐵𑐥𑐵; Devanagari: गुरुमापा) is a mythical creature in the folklore of Nepal Mandala. According to legend, he is said to take away disobedient children, and so was banished to a field in Kathmandu.

The story of Gurumapa is one of the most well known folk tales in Newar society. He is depicted as a giant with a terrifying face and protruding fangs.

== The legend ==
=== Kesh Chandra ===
The story starts with an inveterate named Kesh Chandra who lived in Itumbaha, a sacred courtyard in central Kathmandu. After he had gambled away all of his property, he went to live with his sister. When he stole even the plate on which his lunch was served to gamble, his sister, wishing to teach him a lesson, served his rice on the floor.

Deeply hurt, Kesh Chandra gathered up the food in a handkerchief and walked a long distance to the woods outside the city. Feeling hungry, he unwrapped the rice, and found that it had turned bad and there were maggots all over. So he spread the food to dry in the sun and dozed off.

=== Droppings turn to gold ===
When Kesh Chandra awoke, he found that pigeons had eaten everything. He was so saddened that he broke into tears. Taking pity on him, the pigeons left their droppings which turned into gold. There was so much gold that he couldn't carry it all. As he was pondering what to do, he saw Gurumapa, a man-eating giant that lived in the forest, approaching. He had been attracted by the smell of prey.

Kesh Chandran pacified him by calling him uncle, and persuaded him to carry the gold to his home with the promise of a feast and the right to take away children if their parents called him whenever they were bad. Kesh Chandra took Gurumapa home to Itumbaha and let him live in the attic. As the years passed, children started disappearing whenever their parents warned them that Gurumapa would come and get them.

=== Banished to Tundikhel ===
The local residents then decided that it was not safe to keep Gurumapa in the neighborhood. They promised to provide him an annual feast of boiled rice and buffalo meat if he agreed to live on the field of Tinkhya (Tundikhel). And so the giant was persuaded to move out. To this day, the people of the locality prepare a feast on the night of Holi for Gurumapa and leave it on the field which is now a parade ground.
