= Tanka Prasad Acharya =

19th Prime minister of Nepal

- टंक प्रसाद आचार्य
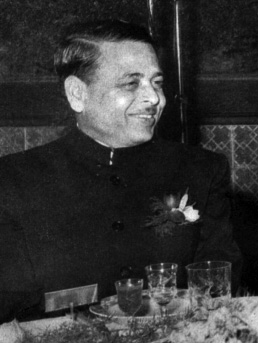

Prime Minister of Nepal
- In office 27 January 1956 – 26 July 1957
- Monarch: Mahendra
- Preceded by: Matrika Prasad Koirala (1955)
- Succeeded by: Kunwar Indrajit Singh

Personal details
- Born: 11 February 1912
- Died: 23 April 1992 (aged 80)
- Party: Nepal Praja Parishad, Nepali Congress
- Spouse: Rewanta Kumari Acharya
- Children: 5

Tanka Prasad Acharya (Nepali: टंक प्रसाद आचार्य; 11 February 1912 – 23 April 1992), also known as Jeudo-Shahid ("Living Martyr"), was a Nepali politician who served as the 19th Prime Minister of Nepal from 1956 to 1957. He was one of the founders and the leader of the Nepal Praja Parishad, the first political party in Nepal with the goal of removing the Rana Dynasty's dictatorship.

== Founding of the Nepal Praja Parishad ==
Tanka Prasad Acharya was born to Tika Prasad Acharya and Tika Devi Acharya in 1912.

Acharya met multiple other intellectuals seeking the end of the Rana dictatorship, primarily Dashrath Chand. In a hotel in Bhimphedi, Makwanpur District, Acharya and Chand came up with the idea to form the Nepal Praja Parishad (Nepal People's Council). They formed the group in 1936, after getting support from other pro-democracy intellectuals like Dharma Bhakta Mathema and Gangalal Shrestha. Acharya was voted the leader of the group. Dharma Bhakta Mathema was also the gym instructor of King Tribhuvan, and Tribhuvan explicitly gave his support to the organisation.

The Nepal Praja Parishad took part in many anti-Rana activities. Initially, they handed out handwritten pamphlets to Nepalis, and wrote articles in multiple Indian papers. Eventually, Acharya brought a printing machine from India to Nepal, allowing them to print and distribute more pamphlets. The group became more extreme as time went on, and later, in 1940, they planned the assassination of multiple officials in the Rana government. However, they were discovered after someone informed the government of their plan. Acharya and many members of the group were sentenced to death, however Acharya was not executed, for he was a Brahmin, and the killing of Brahmins was not allowed under Nepali law at the time. Instead, Acharya was sentenced to life in prison. The Nepal Praja Parishad was effectively dissolved.

While in prison, in 1947, the Nepali National Congress was formed, and Acharya was elected its president. However, due to being in prison and unable to communicate with the Nepali Congress, this was only a symbolic move, and B.P. Koirala became acting president.

== Post-revolution political career ==
Following the 1951 Revolution, Acharya was released from prison and pardoned by King Tribhuvan. For a few years he remained a part of the Nepali Congress as a senior member, however, following disagreements with the Nepali Congress leadership, he split off with Bhadrakali Mishra, another senior politician of the Nepali Congress, and reformed the Nepal Praja Parishad. Acharya and the Nepal Praja Parishad were part of Matrika Prasad Koirala's government in 1953, and remained a part of the opposition to the dominant Nepali Congress.

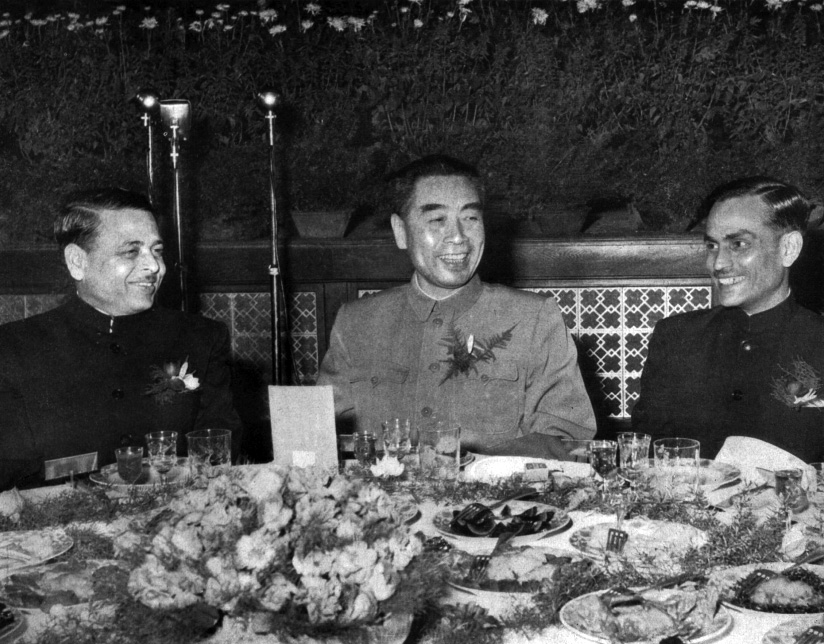
Tanka Prasad Acharya (left) visiting Beijing

== Premiership ==
In 1956, King Mahendra made Acharya Prime Minister. During his premiership, the first 5-year plan was started, the Nepal Rastra Bank was created and the Supreme Court was established. Acharya's tenure was also seen as a golden age for foreign relations of Nepal, establishing diplomatic relations with many countries and working closely with the Chinese government, primarily seen through the signing of the Economic Assistance Agreement with them on 7 October 1956, with China pledging Rs 60 million to the Nepali government for development. Acharya resigned as Prime Minister in July 1957.

== Post-premiership ==
By the 1959 Nepali elections, there had been a split between Acharya and Mishra in the Nepal Praja Parishad, leading them to run separately. Acharya's faction of the Nepal Praja Parishad won 2 seats, whereas Mishra's won 1. After King Mahendra's 1960 coup where he installed the Panchayat system, Acharya was arrested and put in prison. He was released the following year, though he made little political impact.

Tanka Prasad Acharya died on 23 April 1992 due to kidney complications, aged 80.

Political offices
Preceded by Direct rule by Mahendra Bir Bikram Shah Dev	Chairman of the Council of Ministers of Nepal; 1956 – 1957	Succeeded by Kunwar Indrajit Singh
