= Nepal during World War I =

The Nepalese Army, also known as the Gorkhali Army, participated in World War I by deploying several native battalions to British Raj, including the First Rifle, Second Rifle, Kali Buksh, Shumsher Dal, Jabar Jung, Pashupati Prasad, Bhairav Nath, and Shree Nath Battalions. A total of over 16,000 Nepalese Army troops were deployed to the British Raj for frontier security and garrison duties, armed with Martini–Henry and Lee–Enfield rifles. The primary commanders of the expeditionary forces were General Baber Shumsher, General Tej Shumsher, and General Padma Shumsher.

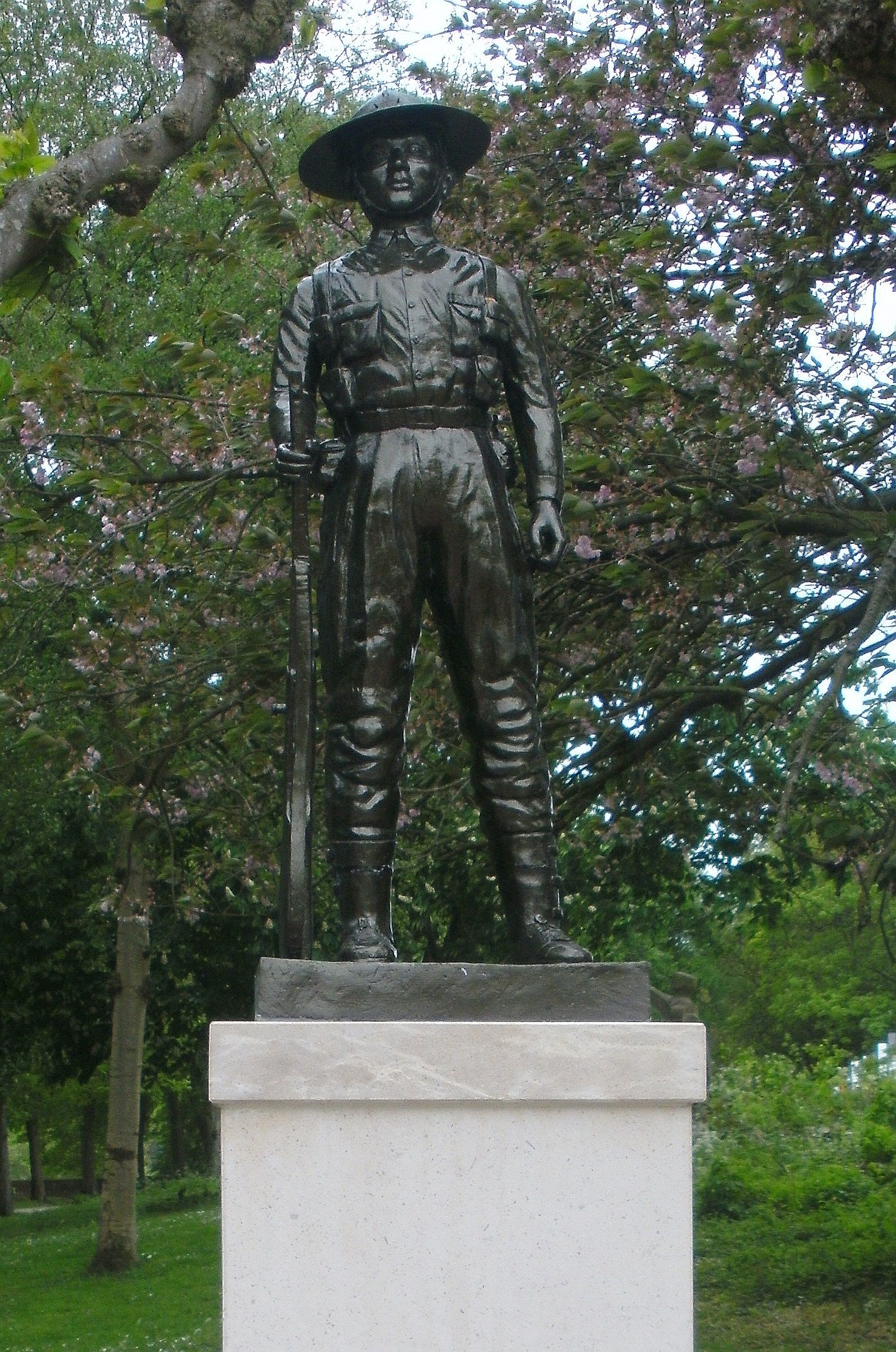
Gurkha memorial in Menin Gate, Belgium: PILLAR INSCRIPTION; IN MEMORY OF THE NEPALESE NATIONALS WHO LOST THEIR LIVES FIGHTING AS GORKHA SOLDIERS IN THE FIRST WORLD WAR (1914–18)

In addition to the state deployment, Kingdom of Nepal permitted the recruitment of over 200,000 Nepalese soldiers into the Gurkha regiments of the British Indian Army, representing a proportionately higher percentage of military-aged men than most combatant nations. The Government of Nepal also contributed direct financial aid to the British war effort in the form of £1 million, alongside timber and material supplies. The professionalism and adaptability of Nepalese soldiers were highly respected throughout World War I.

== See also ==
- Nepal in World War II
- Military history of Nepal
