= Dharma Bhakta Mathema =

Nepalese bodybuilder and politician (1909–1941)

- धर्मभक्त माथेमा
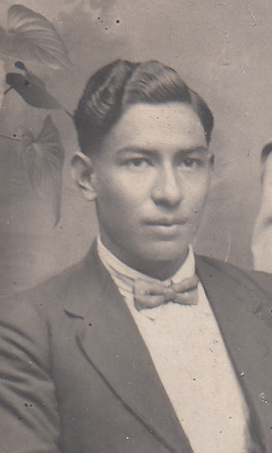
- Dharma Bhakta Mathema in 1939
- Born: 24 September 1909; Kathmandu
- Died: 24 January 1941 (aged 31); Sifal, Kathmandu
- Monuments: Shahid Gate
- Occupation: Bodybuilder
- Known for: One of the four martyrs of 1941
- Spouse: Uttara Devi
- Children: Renu Mathema Shrestha (daughter)
- Father: Adi Bhakta Mathema

Dharma Bhakta Mathema (1909–1941) was a Nepalese professional body builder as well as a founding member of Praja Parishad. He introduced modern body building techniques in Nepal, but had gained popularity for his contribution to the Nepalese struggle for freedom against the autocracy of the Rana dynasty. He was killed during the freedom movement, and is duly recognized as one of the four martyrs of Nepal of the Rana era.

== Early life ==
Dharma Bhakta Mathema was born to a Newar family in Kathmandu on 24 September 1909 (9 Ashoj 1966 BS). His father Adi Bhakta Mathema held a government office as a Subba during the Rana rule. He often went to India to purchase things for the Ranas. He met learned men in India and understood the importance of education. He received his basic education in Sanatan Madhyamik Vidhyalaya in Darjeeling, after which he went to the Scottish Church College in Calcutta to get an Intermediate in Arts (I.A.) degree.

== Bodybuilding ==
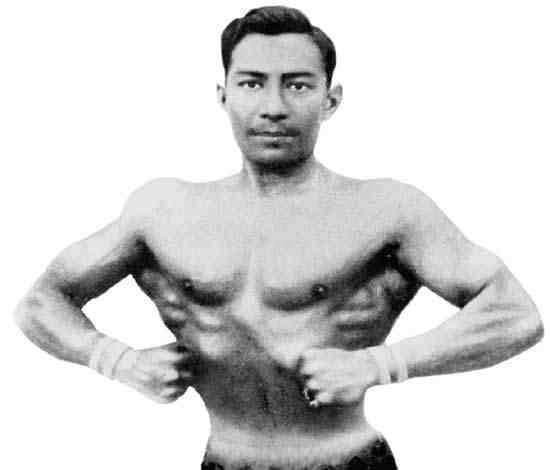
Mathema started bodybuilding while living in Calcutta

Dharma Bhakta's physical appearance was described as thin, unhealthy and weak during his childhood, which caused other children to tease and bully him. This harassment motivated his bodybuilding journey, as he joined a gym while in Calcutta. Constant physical exercise rapidly improved his health. He so excelled in bodybuilding that he was announced as "Shree Bengal" (which literally means "Mr. Bengal") in an all Bengal bodybuilding contest.

After graduating with an I.A. degree from Scottish Church College, he married Uttara Devi from Biratnagar. He returned to Kathmandu and established a gym at his aunt Yamkumari Ray's house. Many youths of Kathmandu were attracted by the novelty of the gym. The gym attracted not only the commoners but also the Rana family and the police forces too. Once a troop of German soldiers had come to Nepal for a visit. He showed his body building tricks and exercises to them in the presence of Juddha Shumsher.

Once during the Ghode Jatra festival, he showed his bodybuilding prowess to the people in the presence of King Tribhuvan and the Rana family in Tundikhel. He made different bodybuilding poses and performed many tests of strength. An instance of such, was when he put a long rod on his back and told three to four persons on each side of the rod to hang. He was then jumping and lifting with those people. In another instance, he lied down on the ground and told a person to hammer his chest with a hammer. People were amazed that a man could be so strong. King Tribhuvan was also greatly impressed by his feat, so much so such that he was appointed as his physical instructor.

== Political activity ==
Besides bodybuilding, he was actively interested in politics. At that time the struggle for the independence from the British Raj was gaining momentum in India. While in India Dharma Bhakta had met Chittaranjan Das and had joined in the struggle for Indian independence. He wanted to establish a political party and settle in India itself. But for some reason he dropped that plan and returned to Kathmandu with an ardent desire for freedom from the Rana regime. Tyranny, debauchery, economic exploitation and religious persecution characterized Rana rule.

In those days, Juddha Shamsher was the prime minister of Nepal, who ruled with an iron fist. All political parties were banned. Dharma Bhakta met Dashrath Chand in Kathmandu in 1990 BS and in 1936 AD, a political party Praja Parishad was founded in the house of Dharma Bhakta. The founders were Tanka Prasad Acharya, Jiwan Raj Sharma, Ramhari Sharma, Dharma Bhakta and Dashrath Chand. His connection with King Tribhuwan as a physical instructor allowed him to act as a go-between the king and the Praja Parishad. He conveyed every activity of the Praja parishad to the King. However discovery of his political activities prompted Juddha Shamsher to exile his father Adi Bhakta Mathema.

== Death ==
One day, a secret meeting of Praja Parishad was held in Lainchaur which was also attended by King Tribhuwan. The information of this meeting reached Juddha Shamsher, which led to the arrest of many of the members of Praja Parishad including, Dharma Bhakta were arrested. Since three of the founding members of Praja Parishad were of Brahmin caste, and hence were exempt from death penalty, they were duly humiliated and exiled. As for Dashrath Chand and Dharma Bhakta, their caste could not provide a shield against the ruthlessness of a tyrant. Both of them were given death penalty. On 24 January 1941 (12 Magh 1997 BS), Dharma Bhakta was hanged till death at Sifal, Kathmandu, at midnight.

== Legacy ==
His statue is erected, along with other three martyrs, in the Martyr's Gate (Shahid Gate) memorial in Kathmandu. Shahid Dharma Bhakta School, a school was established on his name in Nakkhu, Lalitpur, Nepal by his daughter Renu Devi.

One of the major country-level bodybuilding competition in Nepal is named after Mathema as a Dharmashree Nationwide Bodybuilding Championship.

== Gallery ==
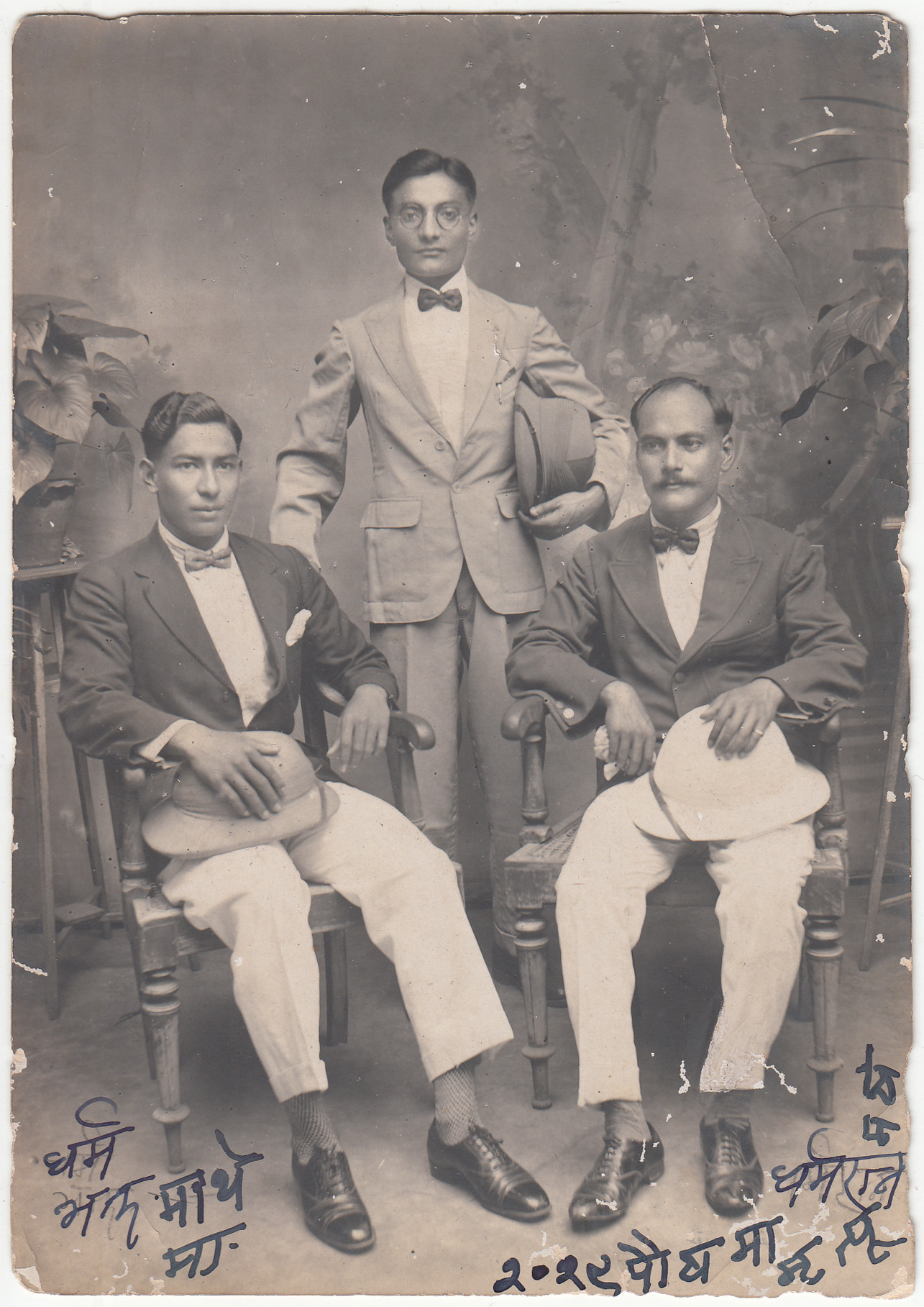
Dharma Bhakta Mathema (left) with Dharma Ratna Sthapit (right) and unidentified person on the center

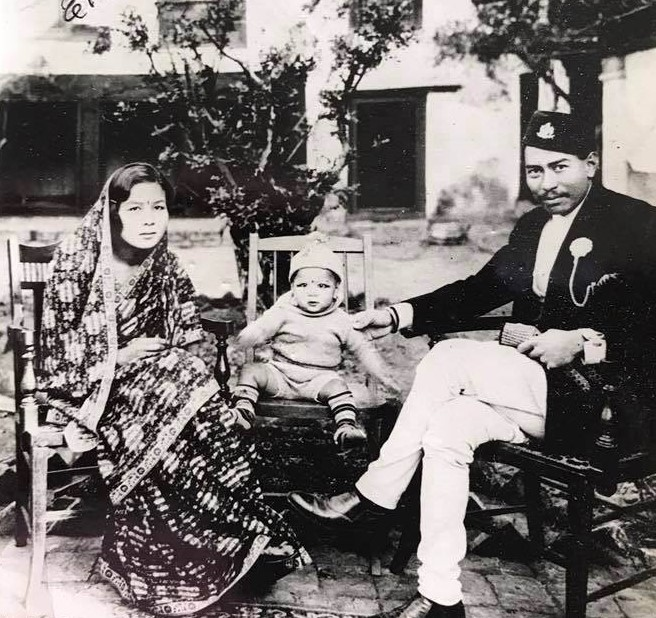
Dharma Bhakta Mathema, with his wife Uttara and daughter Renu at Ombahal, Kathmandu (c. 1938).

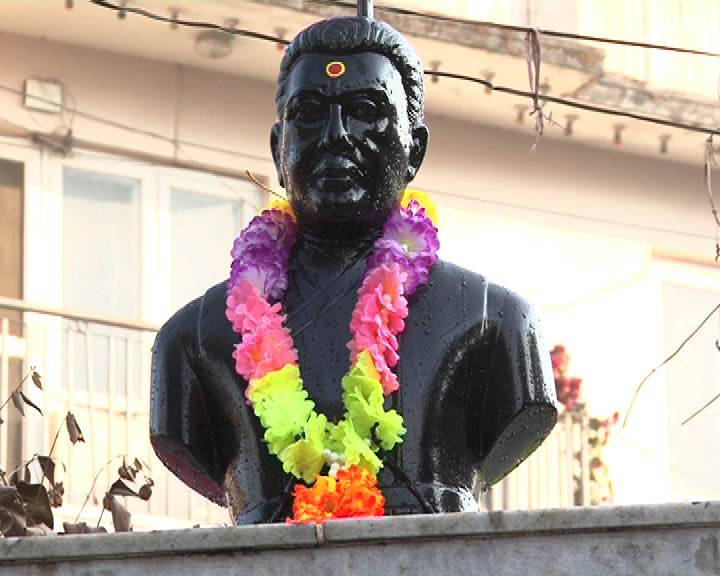
A bust of Mathema built in memory of him.

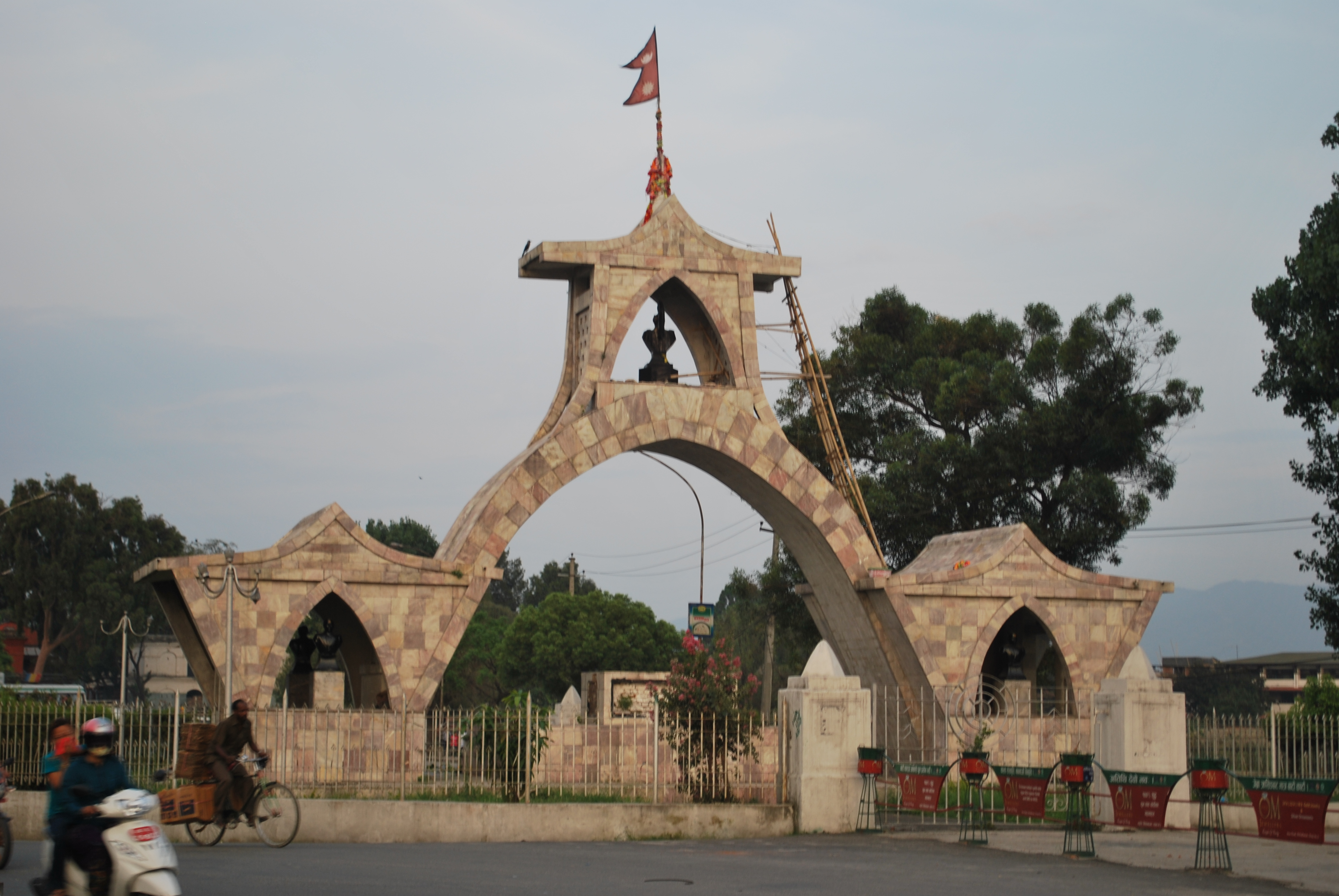
Shahid Gate, built in memory of the four martyrs of 1941

== See also ==
- Dashrath Chand
- Gangalal Shrestha
- Shukraraj Shastri
- Nepal Praja Parishad
