= Tundikhel =

Grass-covered ground in Kathmandu, Nepal

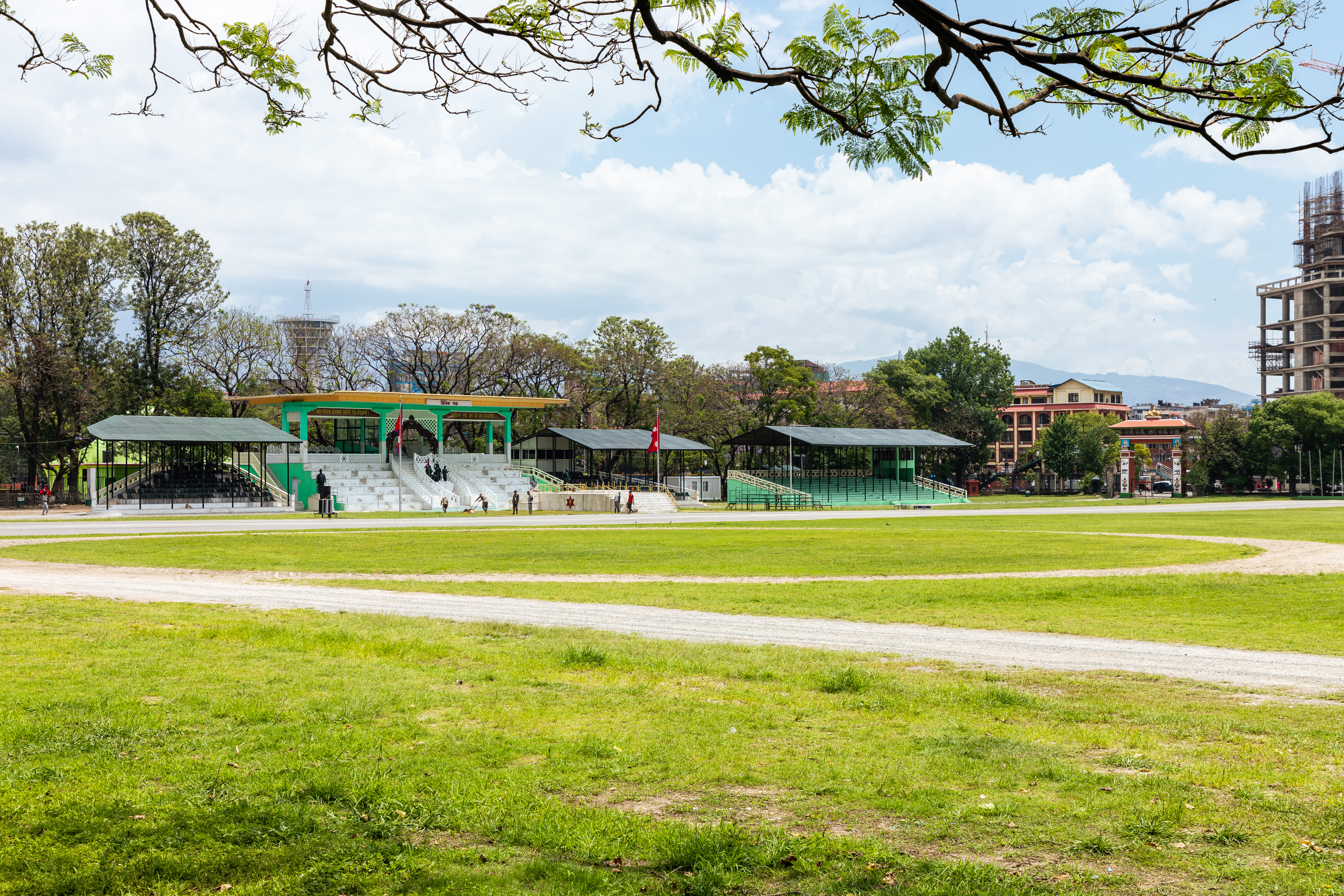
Sainik Manch Tudikhel, Kathmandu

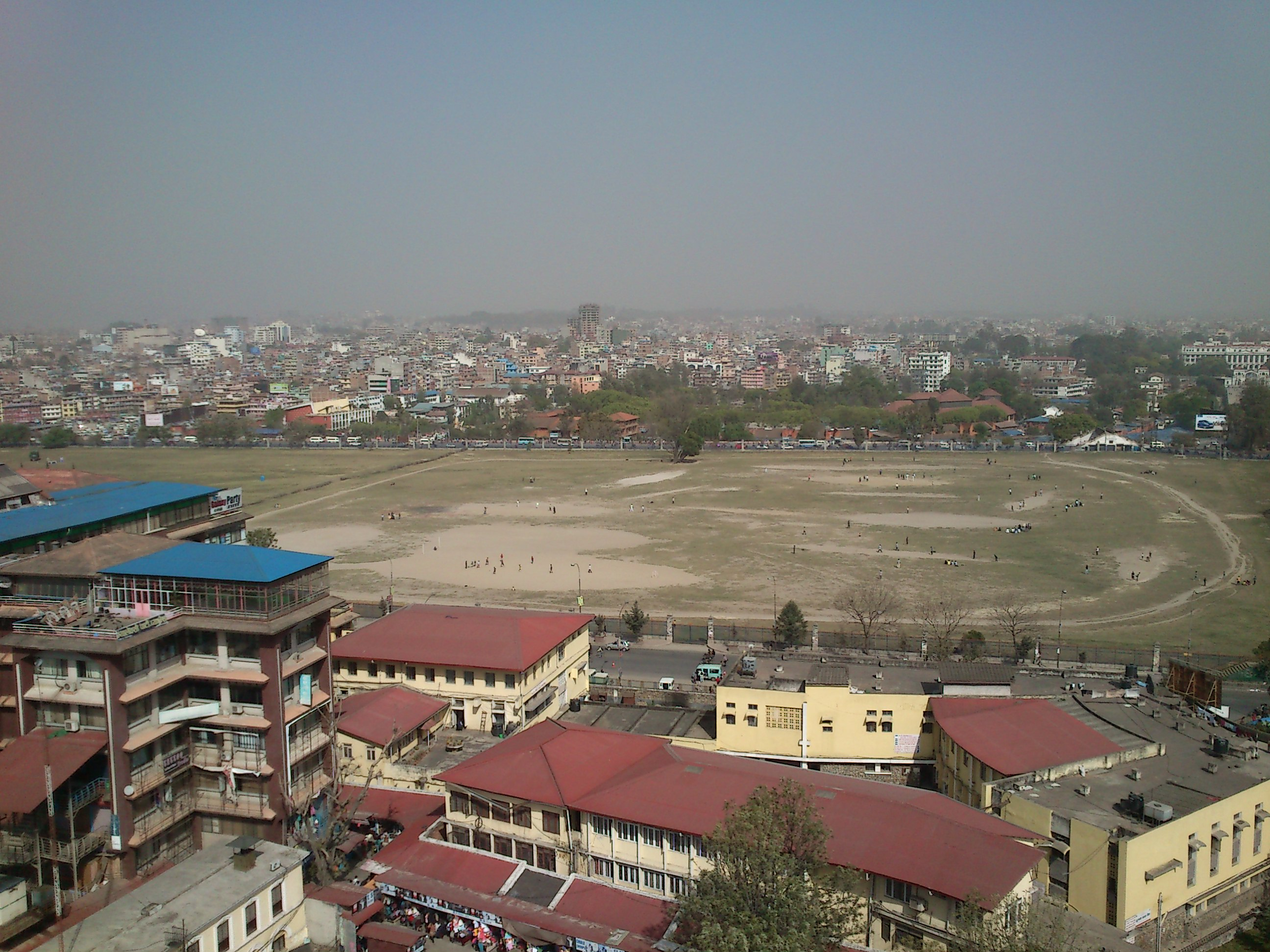
Tudikhel, from Dharahara

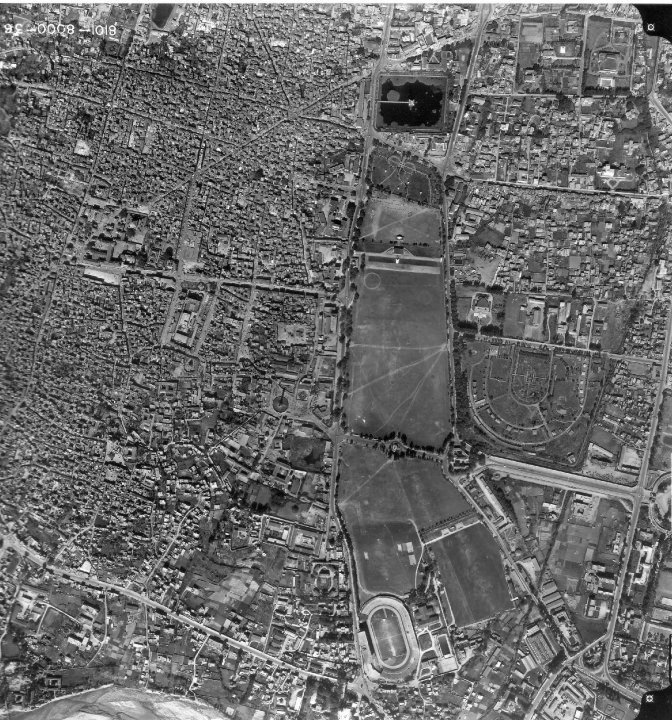
Aerial photo from 1981

Tudikhel or Tundikhel (Nepali: टुँडिखेल; Nepal Bhasa: 'Tinikhya', तिनिख्यः) is a large grass-covered ground in the center of Nepal's capital Kathmandu and one of its most important landmarks. The field is rectangular in shape and has a north-south orientation. It lies between Ratna Park in the north and Sahid Gate, the memorial dedicated to the martyrs of 1941, in the south.

Tundikhel's history goes back to at least the early 18th century during the Malla period. It serves multiple purposes as a military parade ground, horse race track, spot for religious festivals, rock concert venue, public park and cattle grazing ground. Tundikhel has also been described as Kathmandu's lungs as the large field provides fresh air in the midst of the city congested with houses. The townspeople throng Tundikhel in the mornings and evenings to enjoy the breeze and exercise.

During World Wars I and II, Gorkhali soldiers were assembled here before being shipped out to distant battlefields. A large tree stood at the center which was Tundikhel's symbol. Known as Khariko Bot or Chākalā Simā (Round Tree), it was used by Nepal's heads of state and government to make major proclamations. The tree and circular platform were removed in the mid-1960s. In 1960, a small aircraft even landed on the grass field. The Pilatus Porter was in Nepal to provide support to the Swiss expedition which made the first successful climb of Dhaulagiri in the Himalaya.

Tundikhel is also steeped in folklore. Deities and demons are said to have walked here in mythological times. A number of religious festivals are held here, and many sacred shrines are located on the perimeter.

Once extending 3–5 km in length from Rani Pokhari to Dasarath Rangasala Stadium, and almost 300 meters in width, it was reputed to be one of the largest parade grounds in Asia. Today, encroachment from all four sides to build various infrastructure has squeezed it to less than half its original size.

== Festivals ==
Horse festival or Ghode Jatra is one of the spectacular events held at Tundikhel and takes place around March. The main event consists of horse races, a tradition that goes back centuries to a king who ordered that horses be made to gallop across the field to trample the spirit of a resident demon into the ground. Various equestrian events, acrobatics and parachuting are also performed.

During the Pāhān Charhe festival which coincides with Ghode Jatra, portable shrines containing the images of various Ajimā mother goddesses are carried on the shoulders of their attendants and assembled at Tundikhel for an ancient ceremony. During the event which takes place late at night amid musical bands, flaming torches are exchanged between the entourages of the goddesses. The ceremony is repeated at Asan, Kathmandu the next day in the afternoon.

Tundikhel is also the place where the people of Kathmandu celebrate Depujā, also known as Digu Pujā, the worship of the lineage deity. The shrines of the deities known as Digu Dyah are located around the field. The festival of the lineage deity is observed in open fields outside the historical city limits. The entire clan comes together for the annual picnic which consists of a religious ceremony and a grand feast.

The Nepal Army holds a feu de joie at Tundikhel on two occasions. Soldiers fire a feu de joie using rifles and ancient cannons during the festivals of Phulpati which takes place during Dasain and Maha Shivaratri which occurs in February.

== In mythology ==
According to one of the most popular folk tales told in the Kathmandu Valley, Tundikhel is the dwelling place of the giant Gurumāpā. A feast is still laid out for him here once a year in keeping with a deal made in ages past.

The story goes that the man-eating Gurumapa was pacified and brought to Kathmandu from a nearby forest where he used to live. But after some time, he went back to his old ways and began terrorising the townspeople and taking away children. The people finally succeeded in persuading him with the promise of an annual feast to move out of the city and live at Tundikhel. So every year on the full moon night in March, a pile of boiled rice and buffalo meat is left on the open ground for him to feast on.

== History ==
Among the earliest references to Tundikhel is contained in an account by Italian Jesuit Ippolito Desideri who visited Kathmandu in 1721 when Nepal was ruled by the Malla kings. He was travelling from Tibet to India, and has mentioned in his travelogue seeing a two-mile long plain near the pond (Rani Pokhari) situated outside the city gate. He has also written that there are many temples along the length of the field.

Two of the temples remain. The temple of Lumari Ajimā, a mother goddess also known as Bhadrakali, is situated on the eastern edge of Tundikhel. The other temple is dedicated to Mahākāla or Mahānkā Dyah, and is located on the western edge. Mahākāla is a protective deity in Vajrayana Buddhism. In Hinduism, Mahākāla is revered as a form of Shiva.

== Tundikhel In Other Districts ==
Later Tundikhel became a positive trend and started to sprawl across the Nation. So that we can find many Tundikhel (Playground) in other districts as well.

S.N.	Local name	District	Location	Capacity	Purpose	Province
1.	Dhulikhel Tundikhel	Kavrepalanchowk	Dhulikhel	5000+	Football Stadium	Bagmati
2.	Chautara Tudikhel	Sindhupalchowk	Chautara	2000+	Football Stadium	Bagmati
3.	Palpa Tundikhel	Palpa	Tansen	4000+	Football Stadium, Sports Venue, Heliport	Lumbini
4.	Pokhara Tundikhel	Kaski	Malepatan	8000+	Football Stadium, Polling Station, Sports Venue	Gandaki
5.	Fungling Tundikhel	Taplejung	Phungling	5000+	Football Stadium	Koshi
6.	Dhankuta Tudikhel	Dhankuta	Dhankuta	3000+	Football Stadium	Koshi
7.	Bhojpur Tudikhel	Bhojpur	Bhojpur	2000+	Football Stadium	Koshi
8.	Charikot Tudikhel	Dolakha	Charikot	3000+	Football Stadium	Bagmati
9.	Ilam Tundikhel	Ilam District	Ilam	5000+	Football Stadium	Koshi
10.	Sunaula Tundikhel	Dhading	Nilkantha	2000+	Football Stadium	Bagmati
11	Jumla Tudikhel	Jumla	Chandannath	2000+	Football Stadium	Karnali

== Historical gallery ==
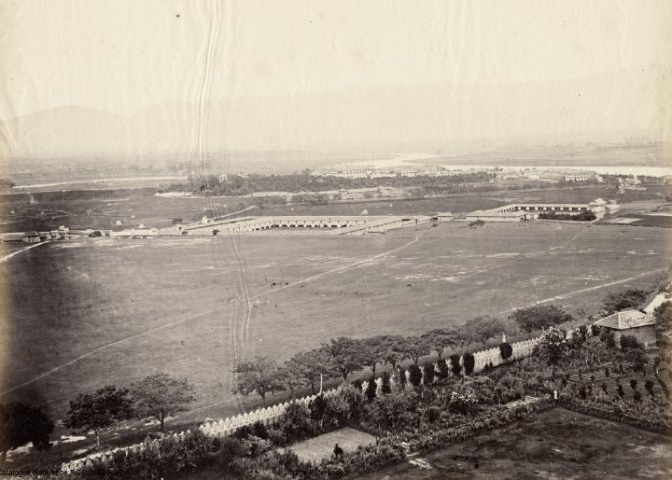
The expanse of Tundikhel circa 1862.

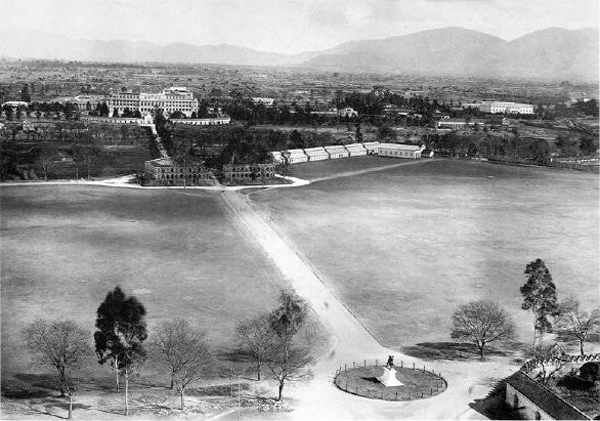
Tundikhel in 1915. The Army Officer's Club has been built on the right.

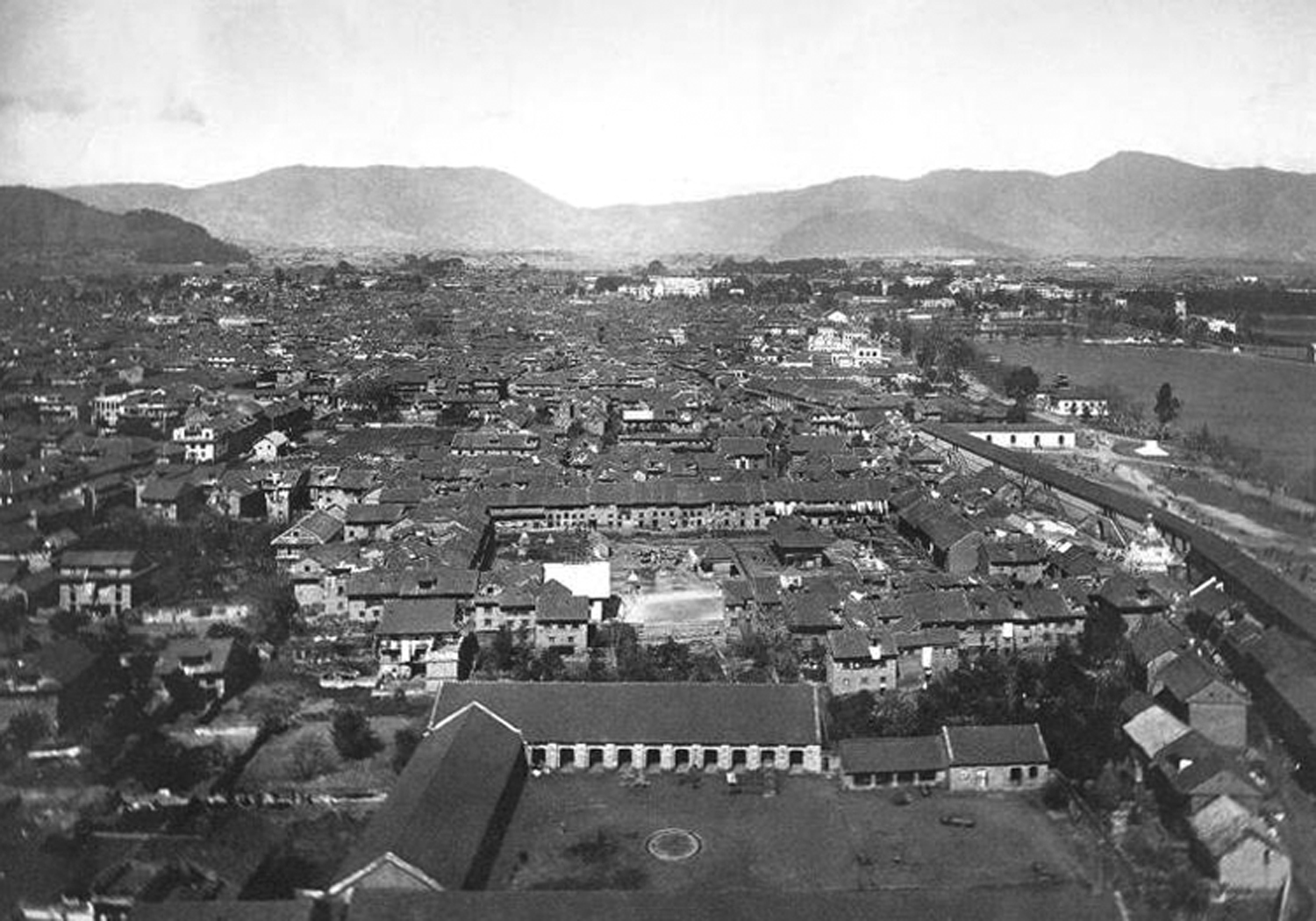
Kathmandu city and part of Tundikhel at right, circa 1920.

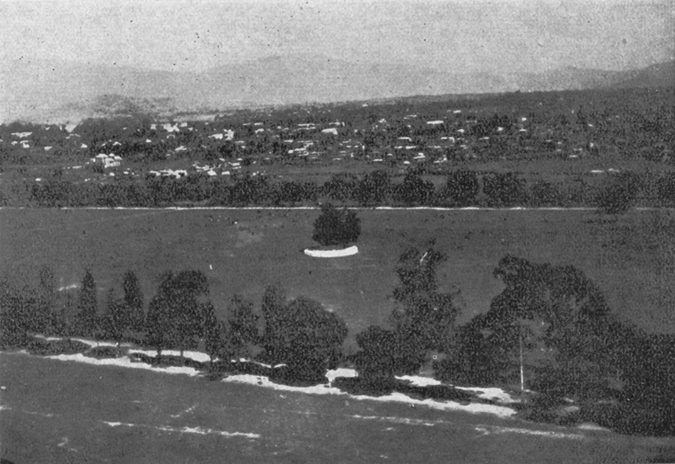
Tundikhel circa 1939 with Khariko Bot or Chākalā Simā (Round Tree).

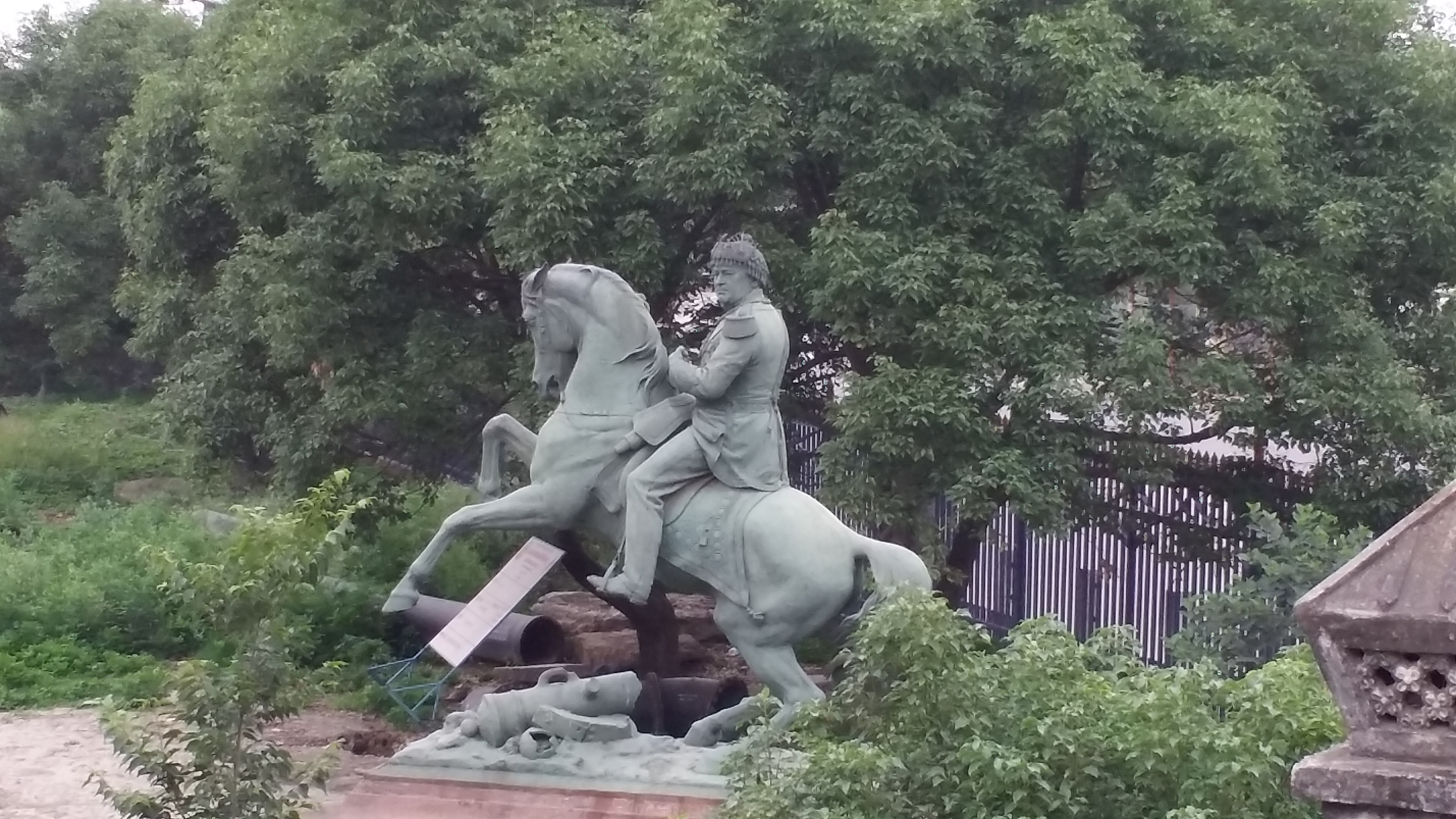
Statue of horse rider at the west south corner of Tundikhel.
