= Dashrath Chand =

Nepalese politician and martyr

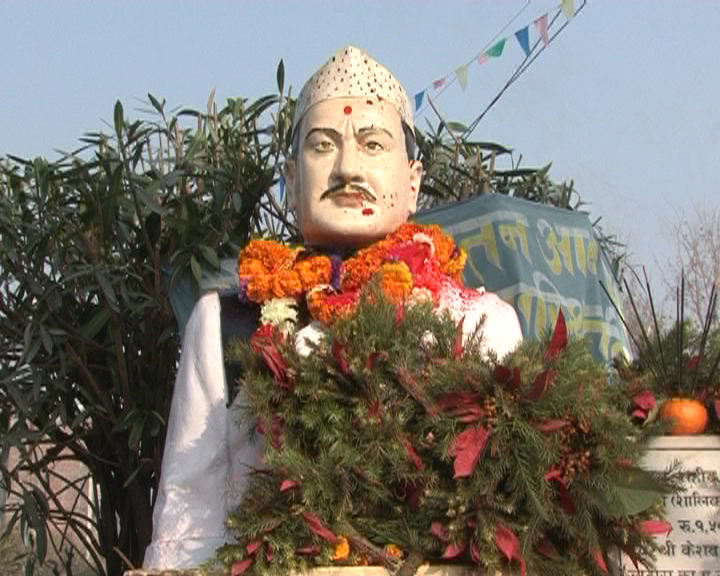
Statue of Dasarath Chand Thakuri at Shova Bhagawati, Kathmandu

Dasharath Chand Thakuri (Nepali: दशरथ चन्द; 1903 – 28 January 1941) was a martyr of the Nepalese Democratic Movement and a politician of Nepal who was active in starting a political revolution in Nepal during the Rana rule. He was born at Baskot of Baitadi district of Nepal in 1903 AD to Sher Bahadur Chand. Dasharathchand, a municipality in Baitadi is named after him.

== Education ==
He received his education at different places of Kumaon like Almora, Nainital, etc. Finally, he went to Banaras, where he completed an Intermediate education. In Banaras he worked for Kashi Nagari Pracharini Sabha.

== Political career ==
The Indian people were trying to free India from British rule. He was impressed by the freedom movement in India and involved in that movement. At the same time, he remembered the miserable condition of the general public of Nepal. The public was suffering from poverty, illiteracy, and ignorance. They were being exploited by the ruling class who had no law to obey and who lived in luxury. Tyranny, debauchery, economic exploitation, and religious persecution characterized Rana's rule. The 104-year Rana regime has been called one of the darkest periods of Nepalese history. Dasharath Chand could not resist protesting the rulers. He was determined to end the Rana rule. He began to write articles against the Ranas in the Janata published from Patna in India, under the pseudonym of Sewasingh.

Dasharath Chand met Tanka Prasad Acharya and Dharma Bhakta Mathema who were active in starting a political revolution in Nepal. A Political party called the Nepal Praja Parishad was organized in the presidency of Tanka Prasad Acharya in Nepal with the active participation of Dasharath Chand. It became active and started distributing pamphlets explaining the arbitrary Rana rule. For about 4 months, the government did not know who was doing it. At last, a reward of Rs. 5,000 was announced for the revelation of the secret. The reward tempted Ramji Joshi, a member of Praja Parishad and he disclosed the secret. So arresting the leaders was begun. Gangalal Shrestha and Dasharath Chand were arrested. In prison, they endured severe torture. They were asked to beg for forgiveness but they did not do so. At last, in 1941, on January 28, Dasharath Chand and Gangalal were shot dead at Shobha Bhagawati.

== See also ==
- Martyrs of Nepal
- Gangalal Shrestha
- Dharma Bhakta Mathema
- Shukraraj Shastri
- Nepal Praja Parishad
