= Military history of Nepal =

The Nepalese Army (Nepali: नेपाली सेना) or Gorkha Army (Nepali: गोर्खाली सेना) is the armed military Land warfare force of Nepal and a major component of the Military of Nepal.

== Early military history ==
In 1846 the pro-British army leader Sir Jung Bahadur (1816–77) of the Rana family finally overthrew the Nepalese government and declared himself the prime minister. Like many dictatorships, Jung Bahadur's office was passed on through hereditary rather than valid elections. Jung Bahadur launched a successful military campaign in 1855 in Tibet (Nepalese-Tibetan War). But the Nepalese-Tibetan War exhausted Nepal's finances and in 1856 Tibet signed a peace treaty which granted diplomatic and commercial rights to Nepal on the condition that Tibet continue to pay a yearly "tribute" to the Nepalese government.

Nepal aided Great Britain during the Indian Mutiny and during World War I. The British government in gratitude for Nepal's assistance declared the independence and sovereignty of Nepal to be genuine by the terms of a treaty concluded in 1923.

== World War II ==
On September 4, 1939 Nepal declared war on Germany in solidarity with the Allied Forces, assisting the United Kingdom as they had in World War I and the Indian Mutiny. Twelve regiments of Gurkha soldiers from Nepal were sent to fight in the British Indian Army. They arrived in India in March 1940. Although Britain has been recruiting Gurkha soldiers from Nepal since the 19th century, no effort was made to develop a centralized recruit-training system in the Brigade of Gurkhas throughout the pre Second World War era. As a result, British Army recruiting training was conducted at the various Gurkha regimental training centres in India. After the end of the war, Nepal also established good diplomatic relations with the United States in 1948.

== Nepal Civil War ==
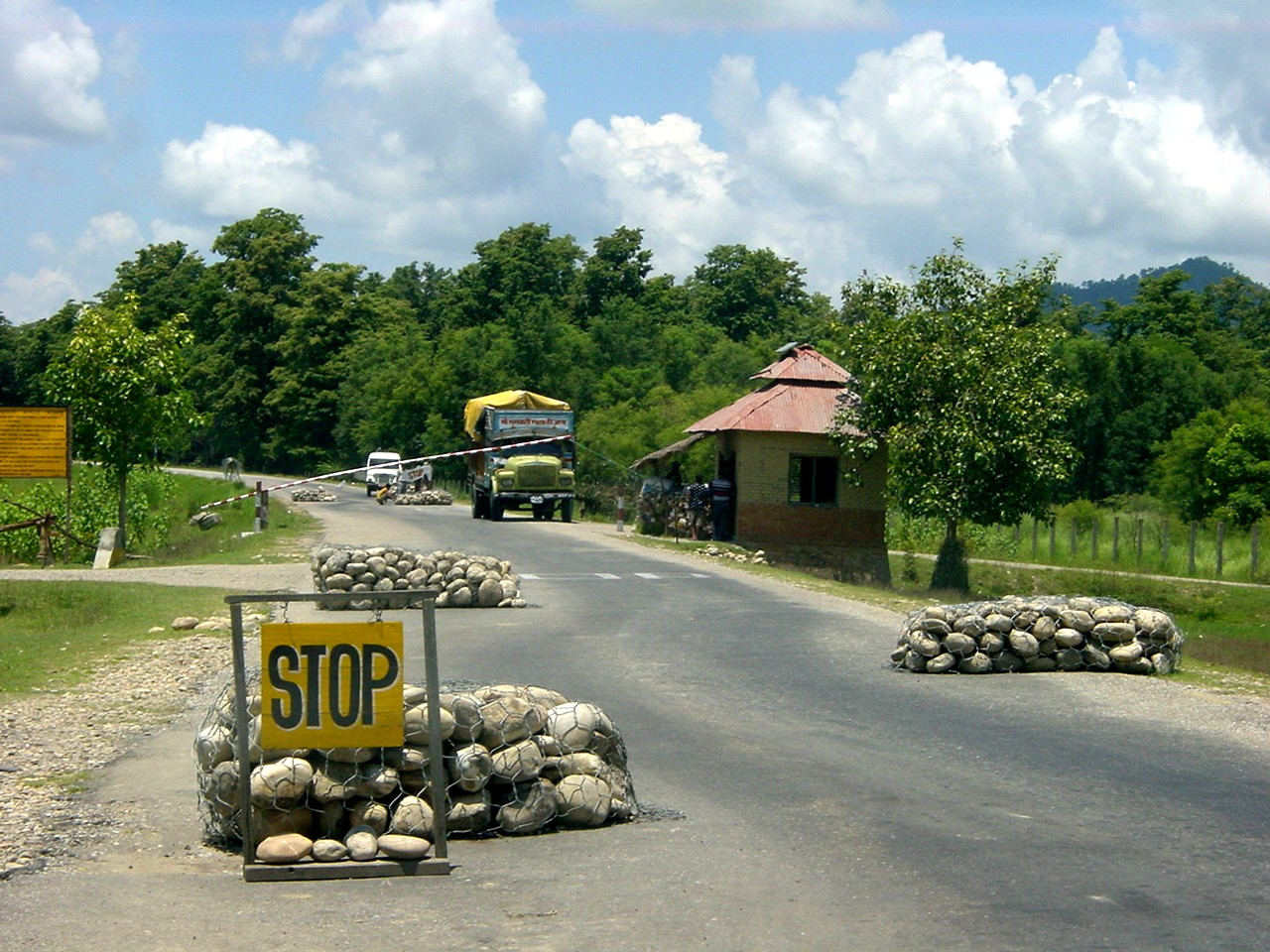
A Nepalese Army checkpoint in 2003. Security checkpoints were raised due to the Maoist insurgency.

In February 1996, one of the Maoist parties started a bid to replace the constitutional monarchy and democratic government with a so-called people's new democratic republic, through a Maoist revolutionary strategy known as the people's war, which led to the Nepal Civil War. Led by Dr. Baburam Bhattarai and Pushpa Kamal Dahal (also known as "Prachanda", fierce in Nepalese), the insurgency began in five districts in Nepal: Rolpa, Rukum, Jajarkot, Gorkha, and Sindhuli. The Maoists have declared the existence of a provisional "people's government" at the district level in several locations

== The end of civil war and establishment of the democratic republic of Nepal ==
The various parties of Nepal together conducted an anti-monarchy campaign by demonstrating and chanting slogans, and finally the king was compelled to declare a democracy. After the democracy the parties leaders had thrown out the monarchy and declared the democratic republic of Nepal. The civil war of Nepal caused by the Maoists had been concluded after the Maoists came into the political mainstream. All the Maoists combatants/militias were concentrated in cantonments and verified. Since last 6 years the leaders are engaged in a constitution building process. There had been 2 elections for constitution assembly and first elected constitution assembly members were not able to draft the constitution on time. Now there is a government led by prime-minister Sushil Koirala (Nepali Congress Party) which has the main task of drafting the constitution.

== See also ==
- Brigade of Gurkhas
- Nepal Civil War
- British Indian Army
- Recruitment in the British Army
- History of the British Army
- List of wars involving Nepal
