= Shukraraj Shastri =

Nepalese politician (1894–1941)

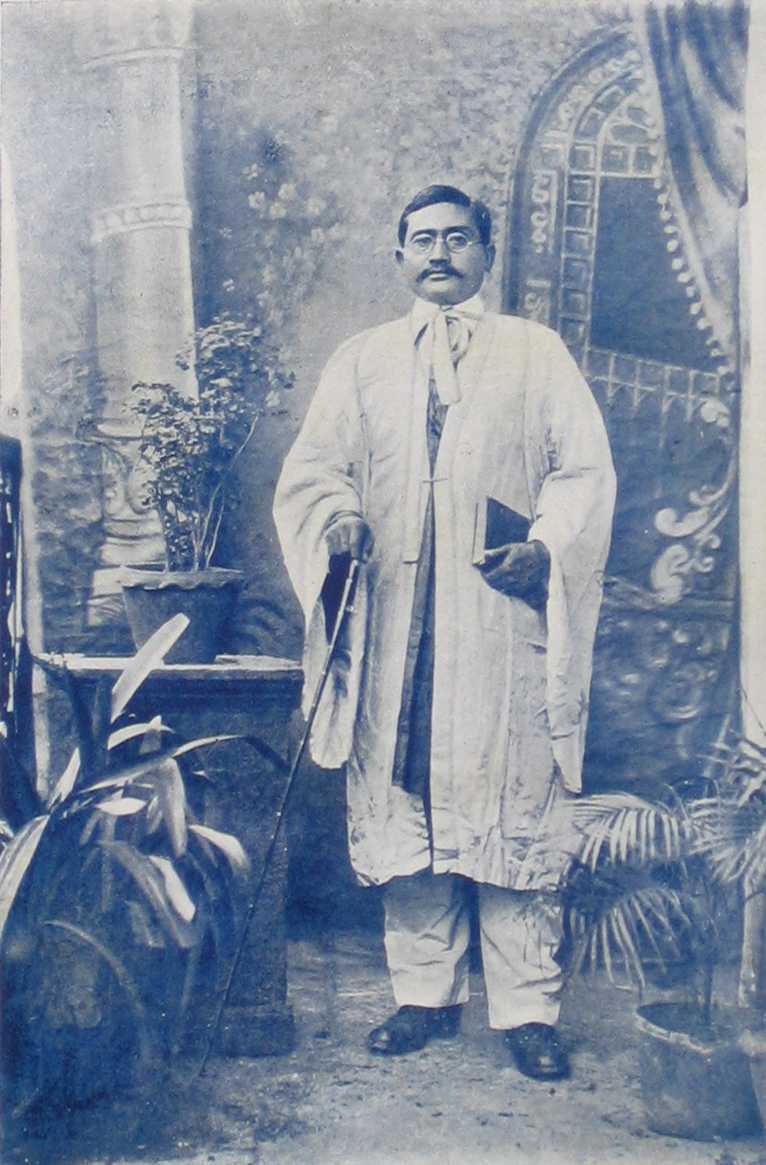
Shastri in a photo published in 1928.

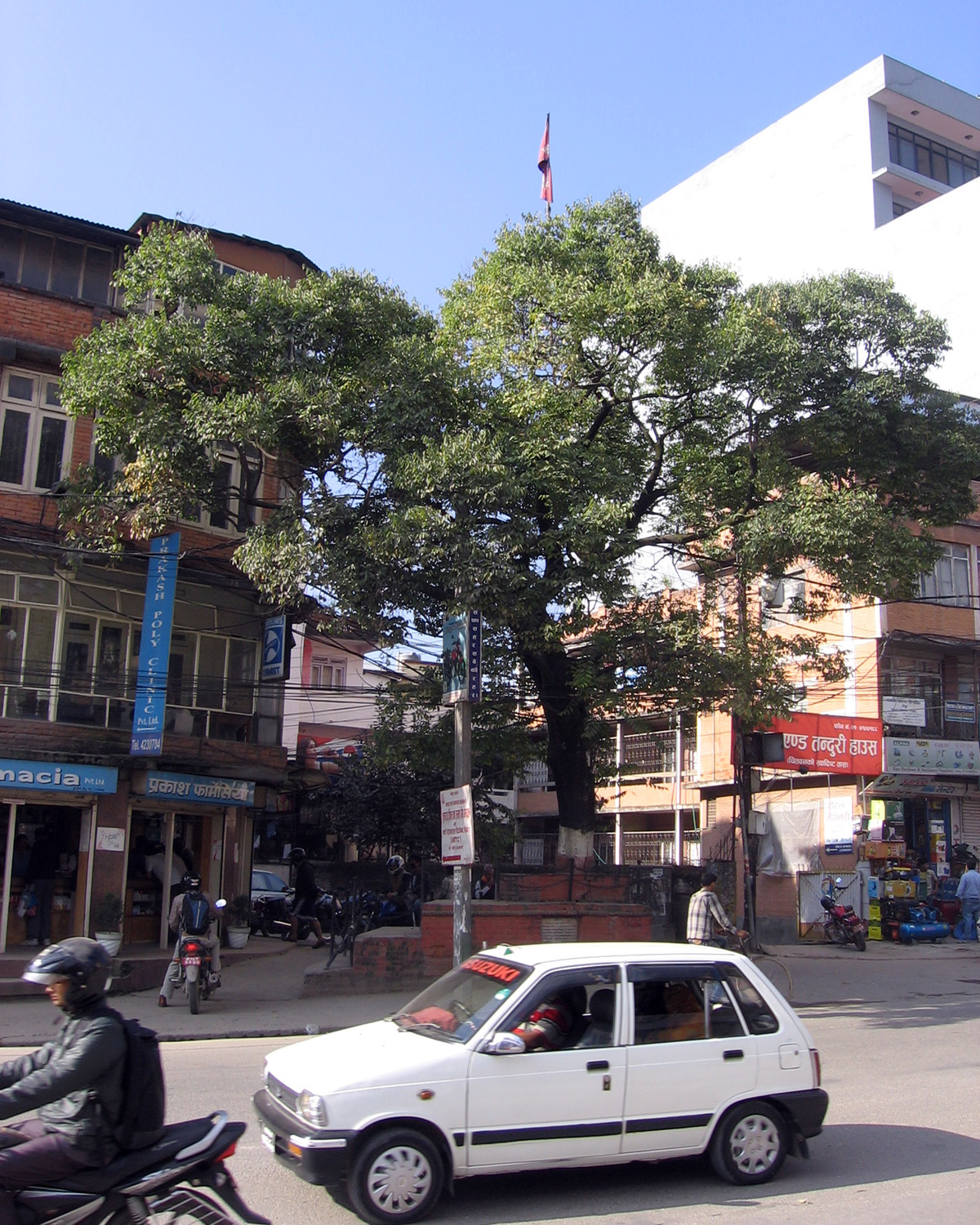
The tree at Pachali from which Shastri was hanged in 1941.

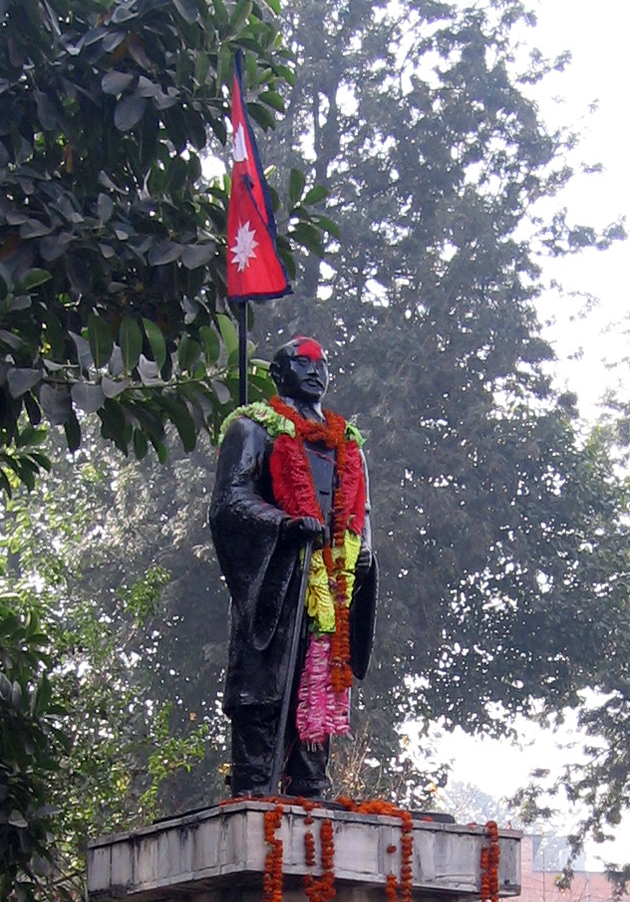
Statue of Shastri in Lalitpur

Shukra Raj Shastri Joshi (Nepali: शुक्रराज शास्त्री जाेशी) (born Shukra Raj Joshi) (1894–24 January 1941) was a Nepalese social activist from Newar community, an intellectual and fighter for democracy who was executed by the autocratic Rana dynasty. He is one of the four martyrs of the Nepalese revolution that toppled the Rana regime. The other three are Dashrath Chand, Dharma Bhakta Mathema and Ganga Lal Shrestha.

Shastri was also a social reformer and author who wrote a number of books in Nepali and Nepal Bhasa.

== Early life ==
Shastri was born in Varanasi, India where his father Madhav Raj and mother Ratna Maya Joshi were living in forced exile due to political reasons. Madhav Raj was a leader of the Arya Samaj in Nepal. The Joshis were originally from Lalitpur.

Shukra Raj was schooled in India, and acquired the title Shastri after earning a Shastri degree from Dehradun. He became better known by this title than his actual surname Joshi.

== Democracy fighter ==
Returning to Nepal, Shastri joined the democracy struggle. During a demonstration organized at Indra Chok, Kathmandu by the Citizens' Rights Committee, he spoke out strongly against the Rana regime and demanded the people's rights. For this act, he was arrested and sentenced to six years' imprisonment. He was subsequently sentenced to death, and on 24 January 1941, he was hanged from a tree on the side of the road at Pachali, Teku, Kathmandu.

The Ranas were eventually overthrown in February 1951, and democracy was established in Nepal. The Rana oligarchy ruled Nepal from 1846 until 1951. During this time, the Shah king was reduced to a figurehead and the prime minister and other government positions were hereditary. Jang Bahadur Rana established the Rana dynasty in 1846 by masterminding the Kot massacre in which about 40 members of the nobility including the prime minister and a relative of the king were murdered. Tyranny, debauchery, economic exploitation and religious persecution characterized Rana rule. The 104 years of Rana regime have been called as one of the darkest periods of Nepalese history.

== Writer ==
Shastri was one of the leaders of the Nepal Bhasa renaissance. He wrote a grammar of the language entitled Nepal Bhasa Vyakaran which was published from Kolkata in 1928. He was the first to produce children's literature. His other works include Nepal Bhasa Reader, Books 1 and 2 (1933) and Nepali Varnamala (1933).

It is believed that Shastri was executed more for his work in social reform and efforts to develop his mother tongue Nepal Bhasa than his involvement in politics. Shastri did not belong to any political party unlike the other three martyrs who were members of Nepal Praja Parishad.

== Legacy ==
Shastri and the other martyrs are honoured on Martyrs Day which is observed annually on Magh 16 (29 or 30 January) across the country. Shukra Path, a street in downtown Kathmandu, is named after him. Shastri's statues have been erected at a number of places, and the Postal Service Department has issued commemorative postage stamps depicting his image. A monument known as Shahid Gate containing the busts of the four martyrs and King Tribhuvan was built in central Kathmandu in 1961.

== See also ==
- Martyrs of Nepal
- Dashrath Chand
- Gangalal Shrestha
- Dharma Bhakta Mathema
- Nepal Praja Parishad
