= Gangalal Shrestha =

Nepalese revolutionary

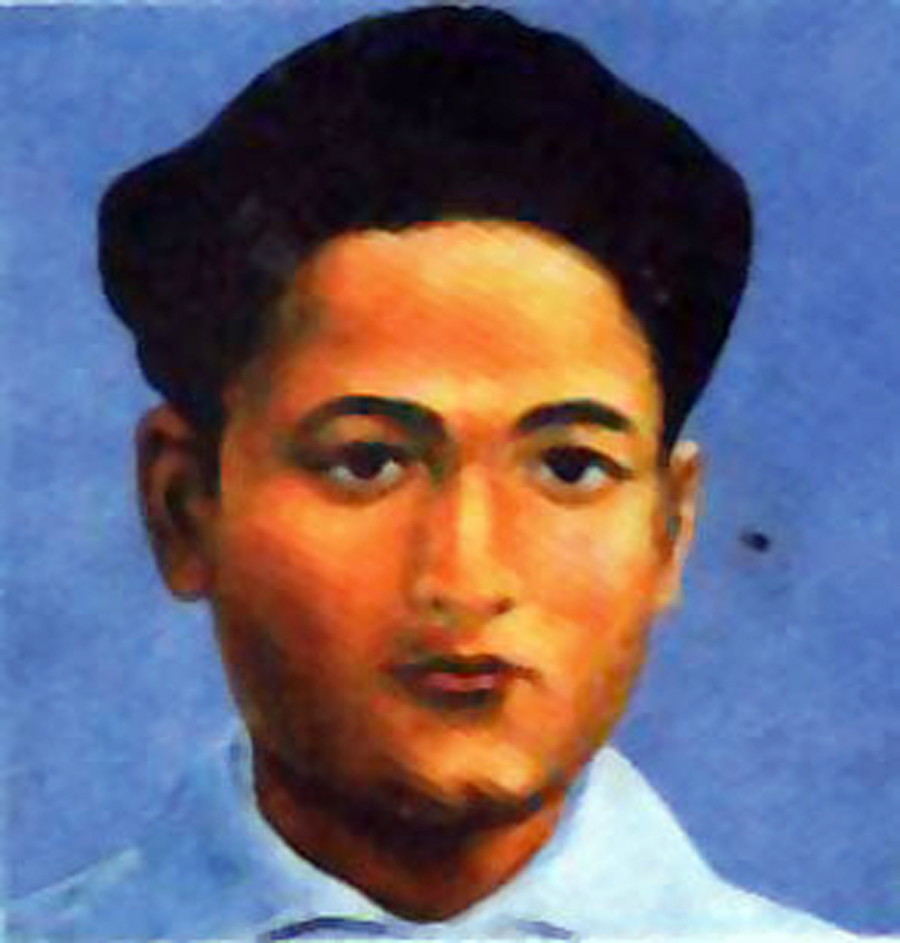
Ganga Lal Shrestha

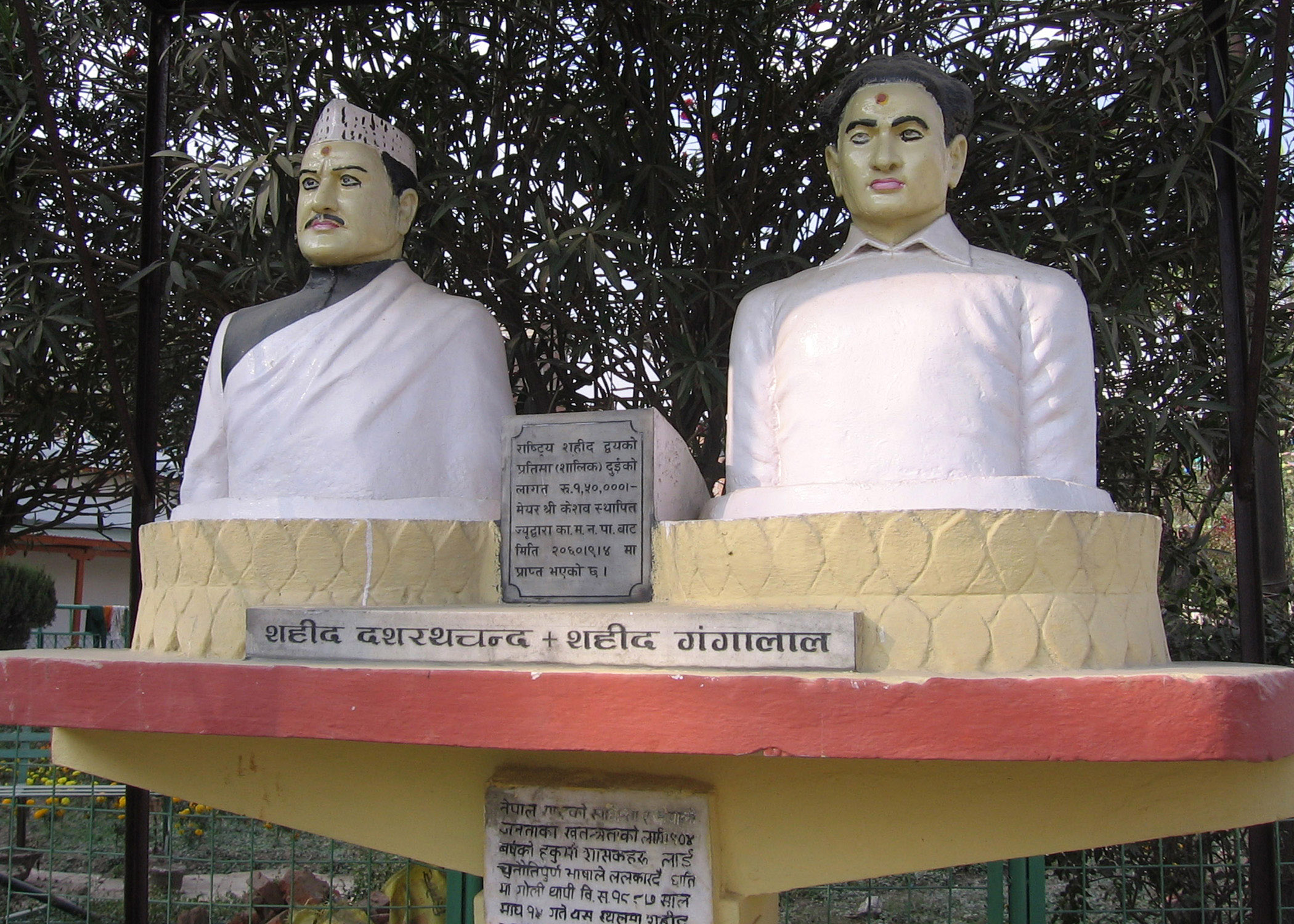
Statues of Dashrath Chand and Ganga Lal Shrestha at Shobha Bhagwati where they were executed.

Stamp of four martyrs

Ganga Lal Shrestha (Devanagari: गङ्गालाल श्रेष्ठ; 1919 – 28 January 1941) was a Nepalese revolutionary who was executed by the autocratic Rana regime. He is honoured as one of the four martyrs of the Nepalese revolution. He was a member of the clandestine political organisation named Nepal Praja Parishad that started a movement in 1939 to remove the Rana oligarchy and establish democracy in Nepal.

== Early life ==
Ganga Lal was born to father Bhakta Lal and mother Tulsi Maya Shrestha in a well-to-do family. Bhakta Lal worked for the government and was stationed in Ramechhap where he was the chief of the Revenue Office. After returning to Kathmandu, he renounced his share of the ancestral property at Chhetrapati, and bought a house in Pyaphal next to Kathmandu Durbar Square. Ganga Lal lived in this house with his family and wife Hasana Devi (1918–2011).

Ganga Lal went to Kolkata with his uncle to study. Returning to Kathmandu, he enrolled in Durbar High School. He is believed to have been an intelligent student and secured first division in the Matriculation examination. After the examination, he was admitted to Trichandra College where he studied science.

== Political career ==
Ganga Lal was an excellent public speaker. He was an active member of organisations that sought to oust the Ranas and establish democracy in Nepal. He had been a member of Mahabir School, whose aim was to fill the students with patriotic feelings. He was arrested briefly in 1939 for giving a lecture in Asan, Kathmandu. After he met Dashrath Chand, he became involved in Nepal Praja Parishad and its activities.

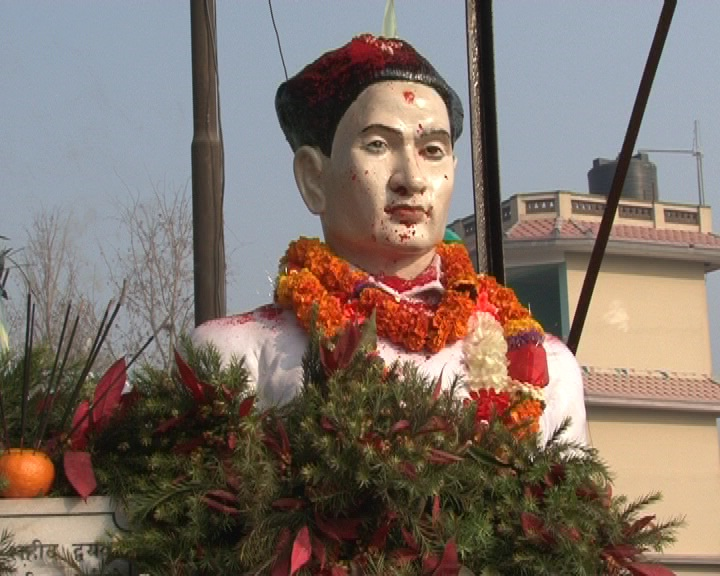
A bust of Late Martyr Gangalal Shrestha built in his memory.

== Martyrdom ==
The secret Nepal Praja Parishad was exposed by one Ramji Joshi in return for a cash reward of Rs. 5,000. This led to the arrest of many of its members on 18 October 1940. On 19 January 1941, the Ranas sentenced Ganga Lal, Dashrath Chand, Dharma Bhakta Mathema and Shukra Raj Shastri (although he was not involved in Praja Parishad), to death. On 28 January 1941, Ganga Lal was taken to Shobha Bhagwati on the bank of the Bishnumati River where he was shot dead along with Chand by Nara Shumsher Rana. The other two, Mathema and Shastri, were hanged.

Ganga Lal was allowed one last meeting with his family the day before he was executed. They went to the jail and he was brought out of his cell with shackled hands and feet. The emotional reunion stirred his youngest brother Pushpa Lal Shrestha to dedicate himself to fight for democracy and equality. In 1949, he founded the Communist Party of Nepal which played a key role in removing the Ranas.

The Rana dynasty was eventually overthrown in February 1951, and democracy was established in Nepal. The Ranas ruled Nepal from 1846 until 1951. During this time, the Shah king was reduced to a figurehead and the prime minister and other government positions were hereditary. Jang Bahadur Rana established the Rana dynasty in 1846 by masterminding the Kot massacre in which about 40 members of the nobility including the prime minister and a relative of the king were murdered. Tyranny, debauchery, economic exploitation and religious persecution characterised the Rana rule. The 104-year Rana regime has been called one of the darkest periods of Nepalese history.

== Legacy ==
Ganga Lal is remembered as one of the four martyrs of the revolution that brought down the Rana regime. Every year on 30 January, Nepal celebrates Martyrs' Day to honour them.

In 1965, Nepal's Postal Services Department issued a commemorative postage stamp featuring the portraits of the four martyrs. Ganga Path, a road in central Kathmandu, has been named after him. Shahid Gangalal National Heart Center is a specialist hospital in Kathmandu. Ganga Lal's statue is installed on Shahid Gate, a monument to the martyrs of Nepal.

== See also ==
- Dashrath Chand
- Dharma Bhakta Mathema
- Shukraraj Shastri
- Nepal Praja Parishad
