= Mohan Shumsher Jung Bahadur Rana cabinet =

Government of Nepal in 1951

- Cabinet of Nepal
- February 1951–November 1951
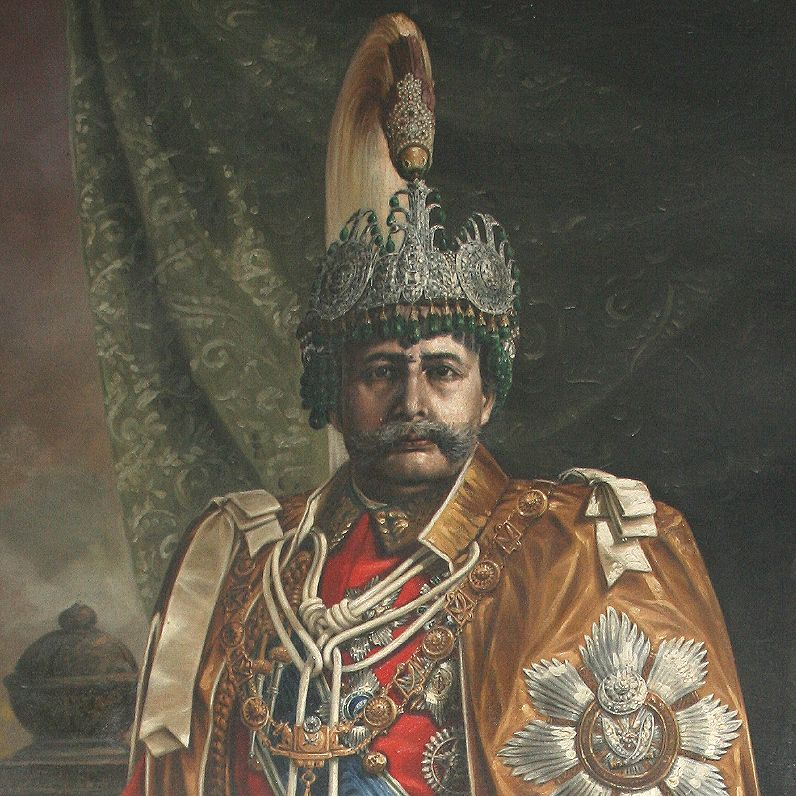
- Mohan SJB Rana
- Date formed: 17 February 1951
- Date dissolved: 12 November 1951

People and organisations
- Monarch: King Tribhuvan
- Prime Minister: Mohan SJB Rana
- Total no. of members: 13 appointments
- Member party: Rana regime

History
- Successor: M. P. Koirala cabinet, 1951

Mohan Shumsher Jung Bahadur Rana formed the first government of Nepal after the 1951 democracy movement. The government was formed by the proclamation of King Tribhuvan on 17 February 1951 and incorporated members of the Rana regime and the Nepali Congress. The king retained the right to dissolve the cabinet at any time and the cabinet would be responsible to him and the prime minister was to inform the king of all decisions.

Mohan Shumsher resigned on 12 November 1951 after Nepali Congress ministers in the cabinet resigned after calling the alliance between the two groups "unnatural".

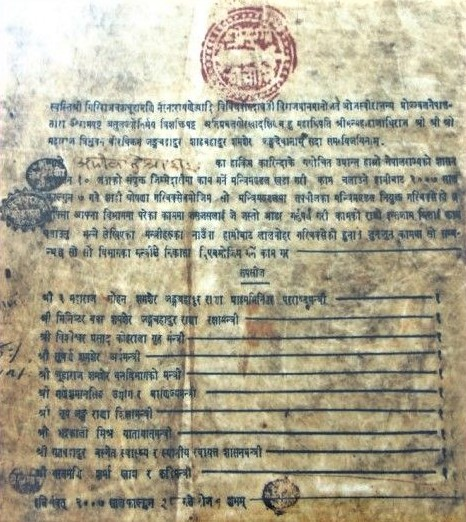
Original copy of the royal proclamation made by King Tribhuvan on 17 February 1951

== Cabinet ==
=== February 1951–May 1951 ===
Portfolio	Minister	Affiliation	Took office	Left office
Prime Minister Minister of Foreign Affairs	Shree Shree Shree Maharaja Sir Mohan SJB Rana	Rana regime	17 February 1951	12 November 1951
Minister of Defence	Babar Shamsher J.B.R.	Rana regime	17 February 1951	12 November 1951
Minister of Home Affairs	Bishweshwar Prasad Koirala	Nepali Congress	17 February 1951	12 November 1951
Minister of Finance	Subarna Shamsher J.B.R.	Nepali Congress	17 February 1951	12 November 1951
Minister for Forest Department	Chuda Raj Shamsher J.B.R.	Rana regime	17 February 1951	10 June 1951
Minister for Industry and Commerce	Ganesh Man Singh	Nepali Congress	17 February 1951	12 November 1951
Minister for Education	Nrip Jang Rana	Rana regime	17 February 1951	12 November 1951
Minister for Transportation	Bhadrakali Mishra	Nepali Congress	17 February 1951	12 November 1951
Minister for Health	Yagya Bahadur Basnyat	Rana regime	17 February 1951	12 November 1951
Minister for Local Autonomous Administration	Yagya Bahadur Basnyat	Rana regime	17 February 1951	10 June 1951
Minister of Food and Agriculture	Bharat Mani Sharma	Nepali Congress	17 February 1951	10 June 1951

=== May 1951–November 1951 ===
Portfolio	Minister	Affiliation	Took office	Left office
Prime Minister Minister of Foreign Affairs	Mohan Shamsher J.B.R.	Rana regime	17 February 1951	12 November 1951
Minister of Home Affairs	Bishweshwar Prasad Koirala	Nepali Congress	17 February 1951	12 November 1951
Minister of Finance	Subarna Shamsher J.B.R.	Nepali Congress	17 February 1951	12 November 1951
Minister for Local Autonomous Administration	Chuda Raj Shamsher J.B.R.	Rana regime	10 June 1951	12 November 1951
Minister for Industry and Commerce	Ganesh Man Singh	Nepali Congress	17 February 1951	12 November 1951
Minister for Education	Nrip Jang Rana	Rana regime	17 February 1951	12 November 1951
Minister for Transportation	Bhadrakali Mishra	Nepali Congress	17 February 1951	12 November 1951
Minister for Health	Yagya Bahadur Basnyat	Rana regime	17 February 1951	12 November 1951
Minister for Forest Department	Singh Shamsher J.B.R	Rana regime	10 June 1951	12 November 1951
Minister of Food and Agriculture	Surya Prasad Upadhyaya	Nepali Congress	10 June 1951	12 November 1951

== See also ==
- Mohan Shumsher Jung Bahadur Rana
- 1950–1951 Nepalese revolution
- Delhi Accord
- Rana dynasty
- Tribhuvan of Nepal
- Nepali Congress
- History of Nepal

Preceded by Rana dynasty rule	Mohan Shumsher Jung Bahadur Rana cabinet 1951	Succeeded by First M.P. Koirala cabinet
