= List of Nepali democratic movement (1951) activists =

This article contains a list of Wikipedia articles about Nepali politicians and activists who took part in 1951 democratic movement in Nepal.

- B.P. Koirala
- Bhadrakali Mishra
- Bidhyanath Pokhrel
- Ganesh Man Singh
- Mahendra Narayan Nidhi
- Gehendrahari Sharma
- Kunwar Inderjit Singh
- Manmohan Adhikari
- Matrika Prasad Koirala
- Naradmuni Thulung
- Rajeshwor Devkota
- Ram Prasad Rai
- Subarna Shamsher Rana
- Ganesh Prasad Rijal
- Yubaraj Adhikari

== See also ==
- Revolution of 1951
