= Kunwar Indrajit Singh =

Former Prime minister of Nepal

- कुँवर इन्द्रजीत सिंह
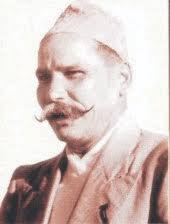

Prime Minister of Nepal
- In office 26 July 1957 – 15 November 1957
- Monarch: Mahendra
- Preceded by: Tanka Prasad Acharya
- Succeeded by: Subarna Shamsher Rana (1958)

Personal details
- Born: 1906 Dumrakot Doti, Nepal
- Died: 5 October 1982 (aged 76) Bangkok, Thailand
- Party: United Democratic Party, Nepali Congress

Kunwar Indrajit Singh (Nepali: कुँवर इन्द्रजीत सिंह; 1906 – 4 October 1982), popularly known as Dr. K.I. Singh or just K.I. Singh was a Nepali politician and revolutionary who served as the 20th Prime Minister of Nepal in 1957. He was a key member of the Nepali Congress for his role in organizing the 1951 Nepali Revolution, and was a leader in its militant wing, the Muktisena, and later refused to recognize the Delhi Accord and was forced to flee the country following a revolt he took part in. In 1955 he returned and formed the United Democratic Party, and following the installation of the Panchayat system he fought for its end, for which he was jailed. Following his release, he went into self-imposed exile, but eventually returned to Nepal and was elected a member to the Rastriya Panchayat. He became known as the "Robin Hood of the Himalayas", becoming an incredibly popular figure throughout the country.

== Pre-revolution ==
=== Early life ===
K.I. Singh was born in the Doti District of Nepal, and his father was a minor Thakuri landlord. He was educated in India, and also served in the Indian Army, where he received medical training. Eventually, he set up a medical practice in Nautanwa, an Indian town on the India-Nepal border.

=== Nepali Congress organizer ===
Before the revolution, he met with Bholanath Sharma, a Nepali Congress organizer, and other Congress members, which led to him joining the Congress in their struggle against the Rana Dynasty. He operated out of Nautanwa, and became a manager of the Congress party office there. He was an effective organizer, and was able to get support from people he knew through his medical practice and ex-servicemen from India.

== During the revolution ==
=== The revolution ===
When the fighting began, he crossed the border into Nepal with a group of around a dozen men and around 8-9 rifles. He set himself up in the village of Myudihawa, but was faced with much pressure from government forces, which forced him and his men to move to Karabla, another village that was more defensible for it was surrounded on three sides by a river. Though he lacked both weapons and food at first, he was able to get both from the countryside, defeating government forces, his old Indian ex-serviceman friends, and a wealthy zamindar called Radhakumari(popularly called 'Muwa by her well wishers'), one of the few zamindar's who took the side of the rebels. He was not, however, properly supported by Gopal Shumsher, the son of Rudra Shumsher, a Rana who was in the line of succession but was removed following Juddha Shumsher's purge in 1934. Gopal was a C-class Rana who was in command of Singh's section of the border, but Singh had a history of being hostile to all Rana's, even boycotting a merger with the Nepali National Congress and Subarna Shamsher Rana's Nepali Democratic Congress, and therefore did not work effectively with Gopel and did not receive proper support from him.

K.I. Singh's main focus throughout the revolution was the city of Bhairawa (current day Siddharthanagar), which he tried to take from the forces of the Bada Hakim (leader) of Bhairawa, though he was unsuccessful. Singh's most serious clashes were with the local zamindars, who were extremely unpopular among the peasantry for allegedly bringing in Indian goodas to loot their villages in 1949–50. When the fighting began, these zamindars sent their families to India and started cooperating with the Bada Hakim of Bhairawa. Singh's battles with the zamindars was extremely brutal. For example, after storming the house of zamindar Bhubaneshwar Shukla, nine government soldiers who were inside were gunned down immediately for allegedly mistreating rebels previously, and fifty Indian goondas who were there tried to escape but were killed by the villages who helped Singh with the siege. When he begged Singh for his life, one of Singh's followers clubbed him to death with a lathi, and the villagers later battered his corpse.

=== The Delhi Accord ===
The Delhi Accord officially brought about the end of the revolution. It was a compromise between the Rana's, King Tribhuvan, and Nepali Congress, which allowed for the creation of a government of a mix between Rana's and Nepali Congress members, with Mohan Shumsher remaining as Prime Minister. Though K.I. Singh was asked to stop the fighting, he refused to accept the Delhi Accord, and was dissatisfied with the leadership of Nepali Congress. He launched another unsuccessful attack on Bhairawa, but was soon arrested in February 1951 by Indian and Nepali troops. When he was captured, his force was said to number 300-500 men. Following his arrest, he quickly escaped, but was recaptured, and sent to a jail in Kathmandu.

== The Raksha Dal Revolt ==
The Raksha Dal was an auxiliary security force set up immediately after the revolution, mostly from members of the Muktisena, Nepali Congress' militant wing. In January 1952, Ram Prasad Rai, a militant revolutionary similar to K.I. Singh who also refused to accept the Delhi Accord, started a protest in Kathmandu against Prime Minister Mohan Shumsher and the Delhi Accord. After Rai had made a speech in the city, declaring the need for a renewed revolt, he was arrested. This arrest led to a revolt of the Raksha Dal in Kathmandu, who freed both Ram Prasad Rai and K.I. Singh from jail and occupied the Singha Durbar. Rai and Singh tried to negotiate with the government, but after a few days, the revolting Raksha Dal were defeated, for the army and most of the Raksha Dal officers remained loyal to the government. Both Rai and Singh fled Nepal into Tibet to the north, but Rai died on route.

== Exile and return ==
Following his escape to Tibet, K.I. Singh was allowed in by the Communist Chinese government and stayed in Beijing during his exile. During his exile, he lived a secluded life, and was not heard from for around two years. He also did not receive any support from the Chinese government, and apparently did not meet either Mao Zedong or Zhou Enlai. While he was away, he became a legend in Nepal, and the "Society of Friends of K.I. Singh" was formed, to agitate for his return.

In 1955, he was sent back to Kathmandu from Beijing for allegedly threatening suicide if he wasn't allowed to return. He re-entered Nepal in August 1955, and was pardoned by King Mahendra. A massive parade was held in Kathmandu to celebrate his return.

== Post-return political career ==
=== United Democratic Party ===
In October 1955, K.I. Singh formed the United Democratic Party (UDP), or United Democratic Front, as an alternative to the Nepali Congress, a party that had dominated Nepal since the 1951 revolution. He claimed that the political parties of Nepal had been unsuccessful, and were full of infighting while the people suffered. However, it was mostly just a party based solely around Singh, rather than a party with any proper platform or ideology. It is also alleged that Singh formed the UDP with funding from King Mahendra, to try to counter the influence of Nepali Congress.

Singh did not espouse any particular ideology, though he was generally left-wing. Many claimed that he was a communist, but he denied it, even though many of his views on issues coincided with those of the Communist Party, and the communists allegedly assisted in the Raksha Dal Revolt. He was said to be both a royalist and a revolutionary, and he espoused nationalist, isolationist, and anti-imperialist rhetoric. He claimed to not work for any party or have any ideology; rather, he was solely working for the betterment of Nepal. His view on India was contradictory, both claiming India was an imperialist power who controlled Nepal and talking of the need of Nepali-Indian cooperation.

In July 1957, K.I. Singh was made Prime Minister by Mahendra, replacing his predecessor Tanka Prasad Acharya of the Nepal Praja Parishad. However, his 110-day premiership was unremarkable, and mostly wasted with conspiracies and attempts to curtail Singh's enemies. He resigned as Prime Minister on 15 November, however the reason for this is unclear. There were claims that there were conspiracies against Singh, involving foreign powers like the United Kingdom, though it is not known for sure. There were also rumors that he resigned due to a disagreement with the King.

In 1959, there were the first democratic elections in Nepali history, where Nepali Congress won a massive victory, taking 74 of the 109 seats available. Many notable party leaders, like K.I. Singh and Tanka Prasad Acharya, did not win their seats, but their parties still gained some. With Nepali Congress forming a government, the second largest party, the right-wing Gorkha Parishad, who were supported and made up by the Ranas, became the opposition. However, Singh wanted to lead the official opposition party, and therefore formed a United Front with Acharya's wing of the Praja Parishad, the Nepal Praja Parishad (Acharya). This United Front was, according to Singh, formed to guard Nepal's highest values, like nationalism, democracy, good government and social justice. Later on in 1959, Singh convinced the two members of parliament for Acharya's party to instead join his party, leaving Acharya with no political representation.

=== Panchayat System ===
In 1960, King Mahendra removed the Nepali Congress government and installed the Panchayat system, a party-less semi-dictatorial system. At first, K.I. Singh supported the move, however his opinion began to shift wildly soon after it began, changing from ardent support for the king to criticism of the system multiple times. In April 1963, he stated he planned to launch a satyagraha to agitate for the restoration of parliamentary democracy. Eventually, after negotiating with the King to try to gain some form of political office, in March 1964 he announced the satyagraha would go ahead, leading to his arrest. Following an appeal to the Supreme Court he was acquitted and released in June 1965, after which he went into self-imposed exile. Many years later, he joined the Nepali Congress (Subarna), and was elected as a representative in the Rastriya Panchayat in the 1981 election. A year later, K.I. Singh died of throat cancer, aged 76.

== See also ==
- List of prime ministers of Nepal
- Mahendra Bir Bikram Shah Dev
