= 1950–1951 Nepalese revolution =

Revolution against autocracy of Rana Regime and to establish democracy in Nepal

Revolution of 2007 B.S.
- Part of the Nepalese democracy movement
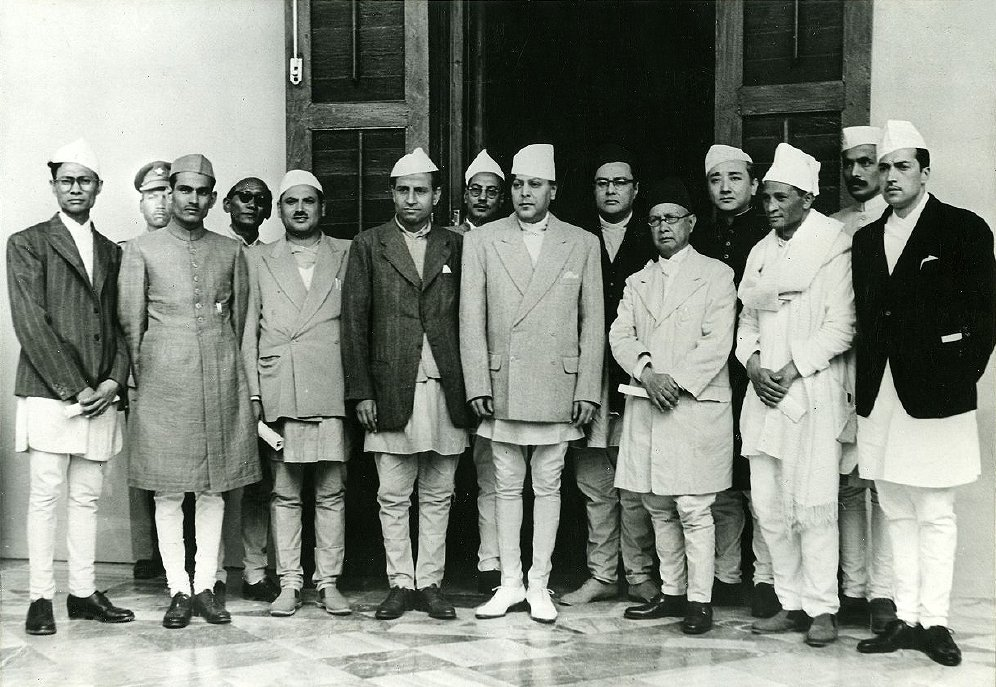
- King Tribhuvan together with leading figures of the Nepali Congress (including Matrika Prasad Koirala)
- Date: 6 November 1950 – 18 Feb 1951
- Location: Kingdom of Nepal
- Goals: Removal of the Rana rule; Establishment of Constitutional monarchy
- Result: Nepali Congress victory: Establishment of Constitutional monarchy; Collapse of the Rana regime; Creation of the Interim Government of Nepal

Casualties and losses
Military dead: 1,600	Military dead: 900

The 1950–1951 Nepalese revolution, also known as Saat Saalko Kranti (Nepali: सात सालको क्रान्ति, romanized: Sāt Sālko Krānti, lit. 'The Seven Year Revolution') was a revolution in the Kingdom of Nepal that brought an end to Rana rule of Nepal which had lasted for 104 years.

== Background of Rana regime ==
After the Kot Massacre Jung Bahadur Rana imposed authoritarianism in the Kingdom of Nepal from 15 September 1846 that limited the absolute power of Shah monarch to a figurehead, and made the Prime Minister and other government positions held by the Ranas hereditary. The position would transferred to younger brother of the Rana PM after his death. The Rana dynasty is historically known for their iron-fisted rule in Nepal.

== Organization for revolution ==
Popular dissatisfaction with the Ranas began to surface among educated individuals, including many from within the Rana ruling class who supported more democratic views. Some Nepalese who had participated in the Indian independence movement and experienced exile were eager to liberate Nepal from Rana rule. These individuals sought to bring about political change and end the Rana regime in Nepal.

== Uprisings and incidents ==
=== Nepal Praja Parishad ===
The founding of the Nepal Praja Parishad was proposed by Dashrath Chand and Tanka Prasad Acharya in a hotel in Bhimphedi, Makwanpur District of Nepal. It was founded in 1936 when they received the support of additional people including Dharma Bhakta Mathema among others. The organization's head office was kept in Dharma Bhakta Mathema's house in OmBahal.

=== National congress ===
On January 26, 1947, the Nepali National Congress was formed in India under the leadership of Bishweshwar Prasad Koirala. Since establishment Congress organized underground activities but on March 4, 1947 (Falgun, 2003 B.S.) Workers of Biratnagar Jute mill demonstrated and started striking against the management. under the leadership of Girija Prasad Koirala and Bishweshwar Prasad Koirala. Nepali National Congress participated in this Biratnagar jute mill strike, supporting the strikers and demanded a Political labour union.

== King Tribhuvan's exile ==
In November 1950, King Tribhuvan escaped the palace under the guise of a hunting trip and took asylum inside the Indian Embassy in Kathmandu. He was subsequently flown to New Delhi, openly siding with the anti-Rana revolution.

King Tribhuvan returned to Nepal in triumph on February 18, 1951, after Delhi Accord was signed in Delhi, stripping the Ranas of their powers, restoring the monarchy's executive sovereignty, and the start of democracy in Nepal for the very first time.

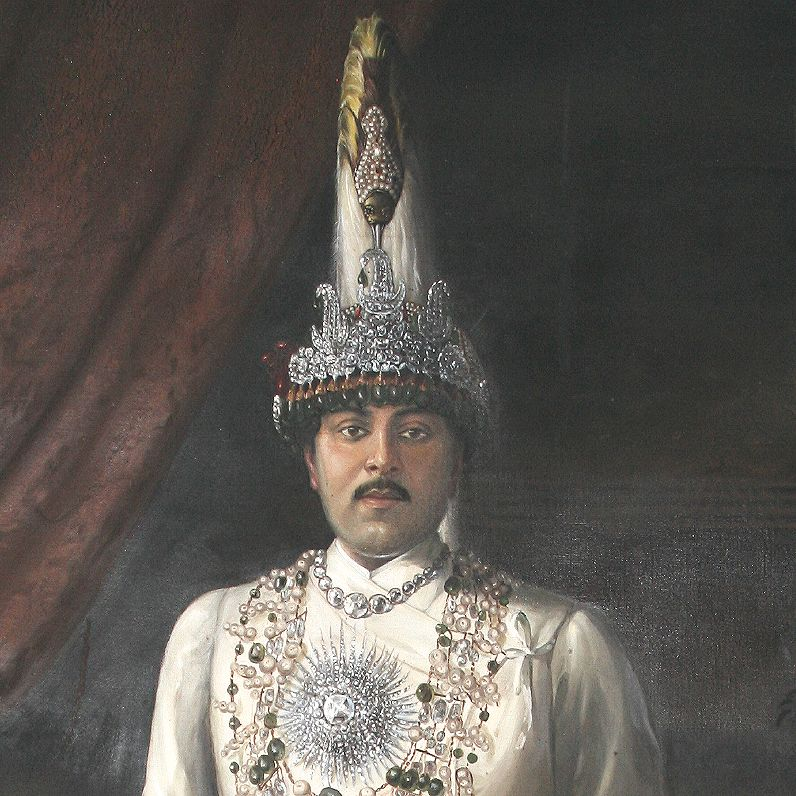
King Tribhuvan

== Nepali Congress's Liberation Army ==
After King Tribhuvan fled to the Indian embassy, the Nepali Congress Party launched a military wing called Nepali Congress's Liberation Army, and started an armed uprising against the Rana rule.

== Delhi Accord ==
After a mutual agreement between Ranas, Nepali Congress and King Tribhuvan, a tripartite agreement was signed in Delhi. Finally, On February 18, 1951 (7th Falgun 2007 B.S.), King Tribhuvan returned to Nepal as head of state.

== Formation of the Coalition Government ==
On 15 February 1951, King Tribhuvan and the leading members of the Nepali Congress returned to Kathmandu.

From the Ranas:

1. Mohan Shumsher Jung Bahadur Rana - Prime Minister and Foreign Affairs
2. Baber Shumsher Jung Bahadur Rana- (younger brother of Mohan Shamsher; was in line for the next premiership) - Defence
3. Chudraj Shamsher - ("B" class Rana representative) - Forests
4. Nripa Janga Rana - ("C" class Rana representative) - Education
5. Yagya Bahadur Basnyat - (Rana Bhardar) - Health and Local self-government

From the Nepali Congress side:

1. B.P. Koirala - Home Minister
2. Subarna Shamsher Rana- (even though a Rana, he was a key member of the Nepali Congress) - Finance
3. Ganesh Man Singh - Commerce and Industry
4. Bharatmani Sharma - Food and Agriculture
5. Bhadrakali Mishra - Transport

This cabinet was reshuffled on 10 June 1951 to replace Baber Shamsher by Shangha Shamsher and Bharatmani Sharma by Surya Prasad Upadhyaya

== See also ==
- Nepali Congress
- Biratnagar jute mill strike
- Ram Prasad Rai
- List of Nepali democratic movement (1951) activists
