= Ram Prasad Rai =

- रामप्रसाद राई
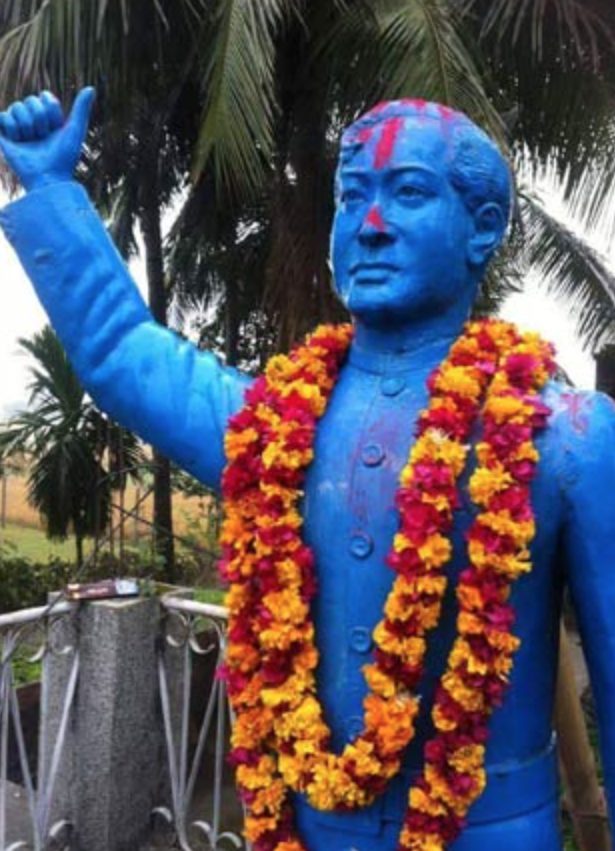
- Statue of Rai in Biratnagar
- Born: 1 March 1909; Basikhola, Nepal
- Occupations: Revolutionary; guerrilla leader; military theorist; People's Liberation Army organizer

Ram Prasad Rai (Nepali: रामप्रसाद राई) (born March 1, 1909 – unknown) was a Nepali revolutionary, guerrilla leader, military theorist and organizer of the Liberation Army in East part of Nepal. Rai was a major figure of Nepal's Revolution of 1951. Following the Revolution, Rai never accepted the outcome of the revolution and continued fighting against the Ranas.

== Early life ==
Ram Prasad Rai was born to Jemadar Dhoj Bir Rai and Ratna Maya Rai, on March 1, 1909, in Sandilung village, Basikhora, Bhojpur. He was the eldest of five children in a well off family. At the age of 14 he left his village and joined the British Indian Army.

== Nepal Army ==
At the age of 25, after serving nine years in the Gurkha Brigade of the British Indian Army he returned to Nepal and joined the Nepalese Army and eventually got promoted to Subedar. During his time in the army he worked at remote hill districts of Charikot, Diktel, Chainpur, Ramechhap, Bhojpur, Dhulikhel, and Khotang. During his time serving the Nepal army he worked on bringing social and political awareness among the people of Bhojpur and Khotang against the Rana regime. He finally retired in November 1950 from the army as a lieutenant.

== Revolutionary ==
He was deeply impressed with Indian freedom fighter Subhas Chandra Bose; thus, he organized guerilla militia with ex-armies and general people of Khotang and Bhojpur for the establishment of freedom in Nepal. During this time he worked with local militia leaders of the eastern hills of Nepal like Naradmuni Thulung and Shreepal Rai. Under Naradmani Thulung and Rai, the Liberation Army was able to capture state land-tax office (aka Mal Adda) of Bhojpur on December 9, 1950 (24th Mangsir 2007 BS) without any bloodshed thus capturing much weaponry and ammunition along with radio-broadcasting equipment. He mobilized the liberation army from Majhkirat Bhojpur Dingla, Khotang, Chainpur, Terathum, Taplejung, Aiselu Kharka, Okhaldhunga, Dolakha, Ramechhap and Sindhuli districts, which were also captured by the People's Liberation Army on different dates.

== Aftermath of Delhi Accord ==
Ram Prasad Rai was dissatisfied with the Tri-Party Delhi Accord (Rana, Congress and King) of 1951; he went back to Bhojpur to continue the revolution and was captured and jailed for 26 days in Bhojpur. Upon his release, he traveled to Kathmandu and participated in the protests against the Delhi Agreement. He decided not to stop the armed revolution. Then he sent some troops to capture Singha Durbar. On January 20, 1952 (6th Magh 2008 BS), he gave a speech at New Road, Kathmandu against interim PM Mohan Shumsher. He was arrested and imprisoned in Central Jail, Kathmandu. He broke out of the jail, released himself and released Dr. K.I. Singh from Singha Durbar with the help of the People's Liberation Army. On January 22, 1951, he, along with Kunwar Inderjit Singh, captured Singha Durbar for 24 hours. They formed a government and he acted as defense minister of Nepal for that 24 hour period.

== Exile to Tibet ==
After losing the captured area, he fled to Tibet with some People's Liberation Army members to take political expatriate, but disappeared on his way.

== Current status ==
His current status is unknown, but he is widely believed to be forcefully disappeared and killed on his way to Tibet in the caves by the Government forces. However, Marie Lecomte-Tilouine writes that: "[...] Rai fled with Singh towards China but died, almost certainly of natural causes, en route".

== See also ==
- Kunwar Inderjit Singh
- List of people who disappeared
- Nepali Congress's Liberation Army
- Revolution of 1951
