= Lamjung and Kaski =

Princely state of the Kingdom of Nepal

Lamjung and Kaski State
- 1856–1951
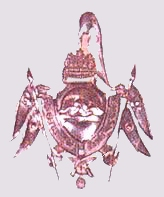
- Coat of arms of the Rana dynasty
- Common languages: Nepali
- History
  - Established: 6 August 1856
  - 1951 Nepalese revolution: 1951
Preceded by	Succeeded by
Kingdom of Nepal	Kingdom of Nepal
- Today part of: Nepal

Lamjung and Kaski was a state which was given to His Highness Shree Tin Maharaja Jung Bahadur Rana in 1856 by His Majesty King Surendra Bir Bikram Shah.

It was ruled by the Rana dynasty, a Chhetri dynasty, and was entitled to a 21-gun salute by the British. The state was formed in the 18th century as part of the Kingdom of Nepal. The state's most famous rulers include Jung Bahadur Rana, Chandra Shumsher Jung Bahadur Rana, Juddha Shumsher Jang Bahadur Rana and Mohan Shumsher Jung Bahadur Rana.

== Geography ==
The present Lamjung and Kaski State is spread over the present-day Gandaki Province excluding the Mustang and Gorkha regions and has an area of 21,504 km^{2}. The region is spread over the Himalayan, Hilly and Terai regions of Nepal. 5,919 km^{2} (26.8%) of the area falls under the Himalayan region. 14,604 km^{2} (67.2%) of the area falls under the Hilly region and 1,310 km^{2} (6%) of the area falls under the Terai region.

== History ==
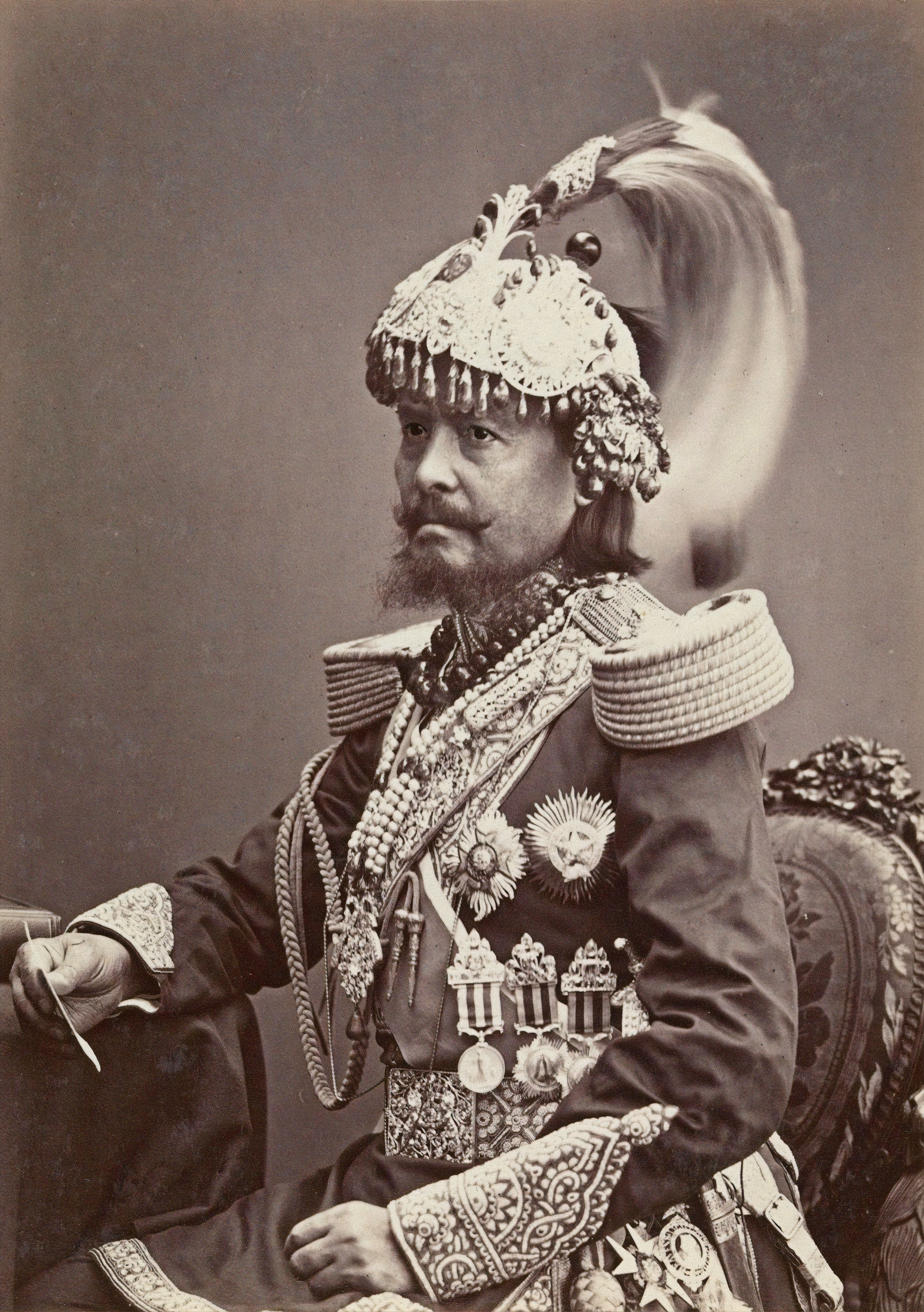
Jung Bahadur Rana in 1887

This region was before part of the Chaubisi Rajya, the 26 Kings. In 1856, a sanad was given to Jung Bahadur Rana that gave him a right to use the title of Maharaja (Great King) and he was given Lamjang and Kaski State. Also in 1856, due to the fact that Jung Bahadur Rana and his brother Dhir Shumsher Rana helped the British in the Indian Rebellion of 1857 the British gave the Maharajah of Lamjang and Kaski a 21-gun salute. After Chandra Shumsher's reign the British gave all the Maharajahs of Lamjang and Kaski the title, His Highness.

== Rulers ==
=== Jung Bahadur Rana (1856–1877) ===
He founded the Rana dynasty and became the Prime Minister of Kingdom of Nepal. During the Indian Mutiny of 1857–58, he sent a contingent of Gurkha soldiers to aid the British, thus establishing a tradition of Gurkha military service in the British army. He also did much to improve and modernize the administration of the country and revised the old penal code. He was the first Prime Minister of Nepal to tour Britain and Europe. His full title was-

His Highness Commanding-General Supradipta-Manyabara Svasti Sri Madati Prachandra Bhujadandyetyadi Sri Sri Sri Maharaja Sir Jung Bahadur Rana, T'ung-ling-ping-ma-Kuo-Kang-wang, GCB, GCSI, Prime Minister of Nepal, Maharajah of Lamjang and Kaski.

=== Ranodip Singh Kunwar Rana (1877–1885) ===
He was the second Prime Minister of Nepal from the Rana dynasty and the second Maharajah of Lamjang and Kaski. Ranodip established many Sanskrit schools and published the first Nepali calendar. His full title was-

His Excellency Commanding-General Svasti Sri Madati Prachandra Bhujadandyetyadi Sri Sri Sri Maharaja Sir Ranodip Singh Kunwar, Tung-ling-ping-ma-kuo-kang-wang, Prime Minister of Nepal, Maharajah of Lamjang and Kaski.

=== Bir Shumsher Jung Bahadur Rana (1885–1901) ===
He was the third Prime Minister of Nepal from the Rana dynasty and the third Maharajah of Lamjang and Kaski. Bir Shamsher constructed Bir Hospital, Singh Durbar, Vaidya Khana, Bir Library and Bir Dhara. His full title was-

His Highness Commanding-General Svasti Sri Madati Prachandra Bhujadandyetyadi Sri Sri Sri Maharaja Sir Ranodip Singh Kunwar, Prime Minister of Nepal, Maharajah of Lamjang and Kaski.

=== Dev Shumsher Jung Bahadur Rana (1901) ===
He was the fourth Prime Minister of Nepal from the Rana dynasty and the fourth Maharajah of Lamjang and Kaski. Dev Shamsher gave the publication of Gorkhapatra and some Primary schools to the public. He established Kanya primary school for girls. His full title was-

His Excellency Commanding-General Svasti Sri Madati Prachandra Bhujadandyetyadi Sri Sri Sri Maharaja Sir Dev Shumsher Jung Bahadur Rana, Prime Minister of Nepal, Maharajah of Lamjang and Kaski.

=== Chandra Shumsher Jung Bahadur Rana (1901–1929) ===
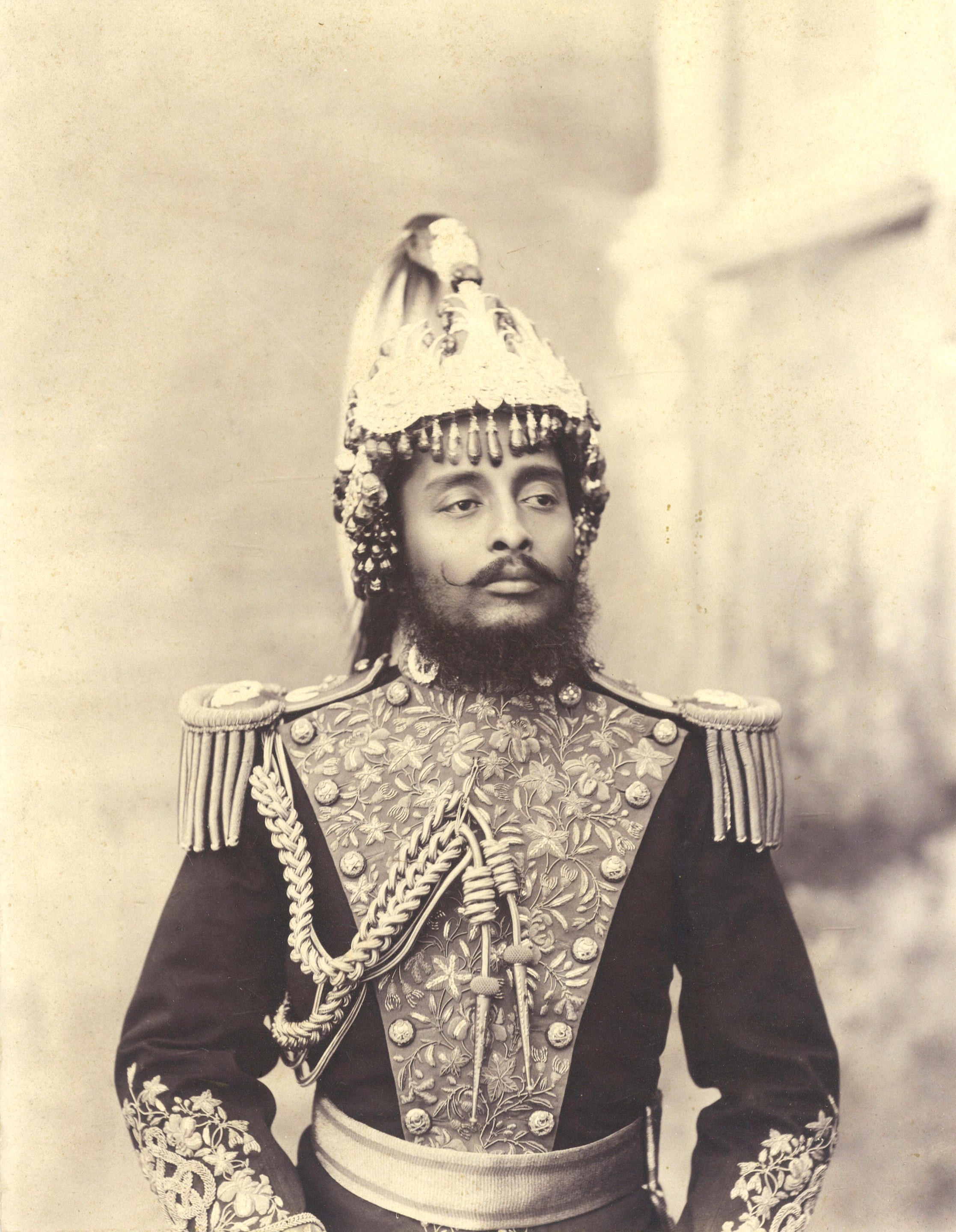
HH Sri Tin Maharaja Chandra Shamsher

He abolished Sati custom, and made it illegal for a person to be killed for witchcraft. He banned ritual suicide, and made additional reforms such as abolishing slavery with money from the treasury of Pashupatinath temple. He was the second Maharajah of Lamjang and Kaski and the second Prime Minister of Nepal to visit Britain and tour Europe after Jung Bahadur. On 24 June, the University of Oxford conferred the honoris causa degree of Doctor of Civil Laws on him. On his departure, the Daily Telegraph wrote:

During the last few years this country has been visited by an unexampled succession of foreign personages, but none of them has been more interesting and few more important than the Prime Minister of Nepal.

He provided monetary and military assistance to Britain in the First World War, as a result of which Nepal received a huge sum of monetary assistance, and the friendship became even more cordial after the successful conclusion of the Nepal–Britain Treaty of 1923, which recognised Nepal as an independent nation and an ally of the British Empire. His full title was-

His Highness Field Marshal Supradipta-Manyabara Svasti Sri Madati Prachandra Bhujadandyetyadi Projjwala-Nepala Taradhisha Sri Sri Sri Maharaja Sir Chandra Shumsher Jung Bahadur Rana, T'ung-ling-ping-ma-Kuo-Kang-wang, GCB, GCSI, GCMG, GCVO, FRGS, Prime Minister of Nepal, Maharajah of Lamjang and Kaski.

=== Bhim Shumsher Jung Bahadur Rana (1929–1932) ===
He was the sixth Prime Minister of Nepal from the Rana dynasty and the sixth Maharajah of Lamjang and Kaski. His full title was-

His Highness Field Marshal Supradipta-Manyabara Svasti Sri Madati Prachandra Bhujadandyetyadi Projjwala-Nepala Taradhisha Sri Sri Sri Maharaja Sir Bhim Shumsher Jung Bahadur Rana, Prime Minister of Nepal, Maharajah of Lamjang and Kaski.

=== Juddha Shumsher Jung Bahadur Rana (1932–1945) ===
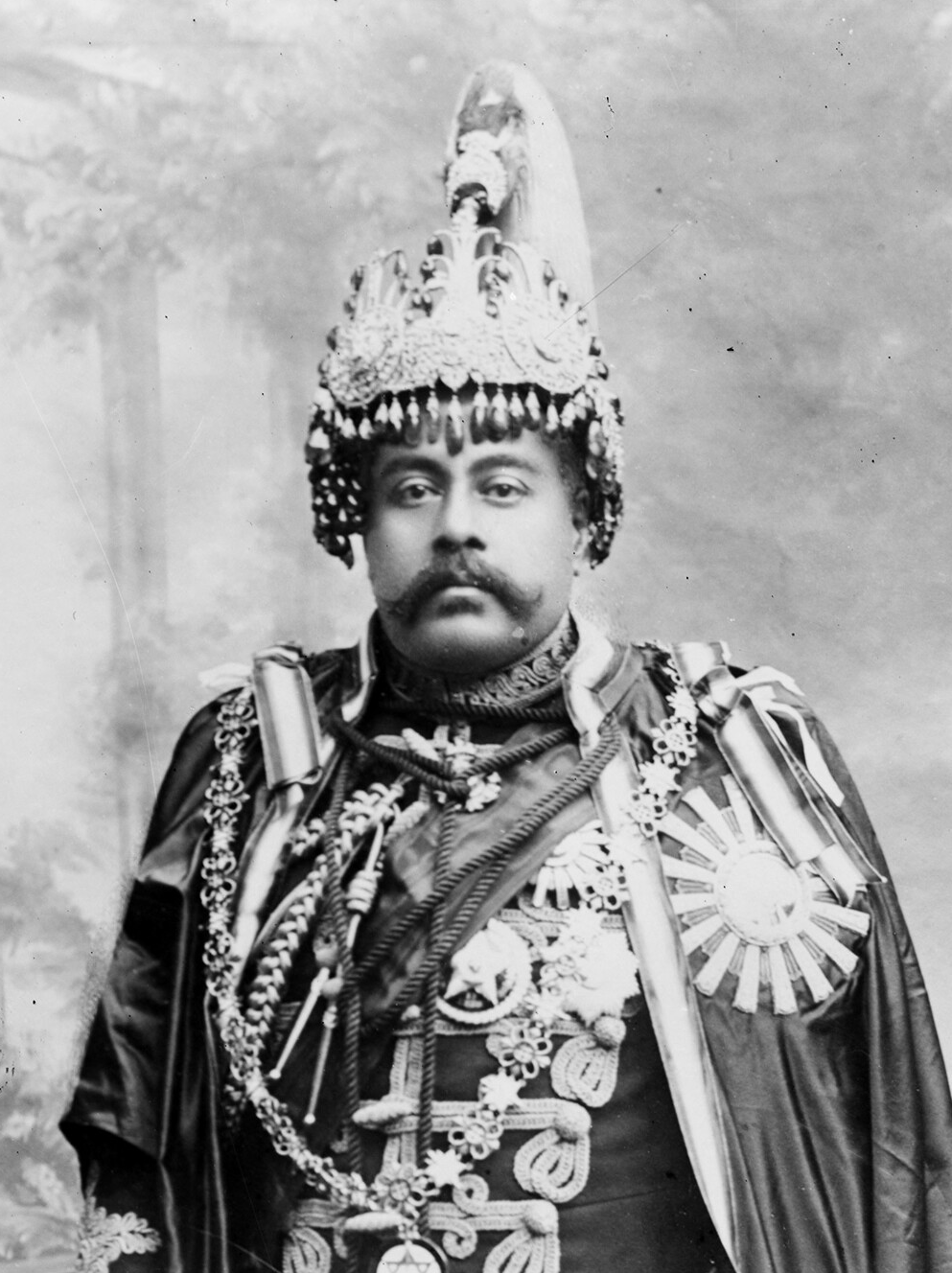
HH Sri Tin Maharaja Juddha Shumsher Jung Bahadur Rana

He was the seventh Prime Minister of Nepal from the Rana dynasty and the seventh Maharajah of Lamjang and Kaski. Juddha Shumsher introduced the system of pension payment to civil servants and opened an office for keeping records of people's births and deaths. Juddha Shumsher implemented Company Act and established industries, such as Biratnagar Jute Mills, Juddha Match Factory etc. That is why he is known as the father of Nepalese Industries. Nepal had a trade surplus at that time. His full title was-

His Highness Field Marshal Supradipta-Manyabara Svasti Sri Madati Prachandra Bhujadandyetyadi Projjwala-Nepala Taradhisha Sri Sri Sri Maharaja Sir Juddha Shumsher Jung Bahadur Rana, GCB, GCSI, GCIE, Prime Minister of Nepal, Maharajah of Lamjang and Kaski.

=== Padma Shumsher Jung Bahadur Rana (1945–1948) ===
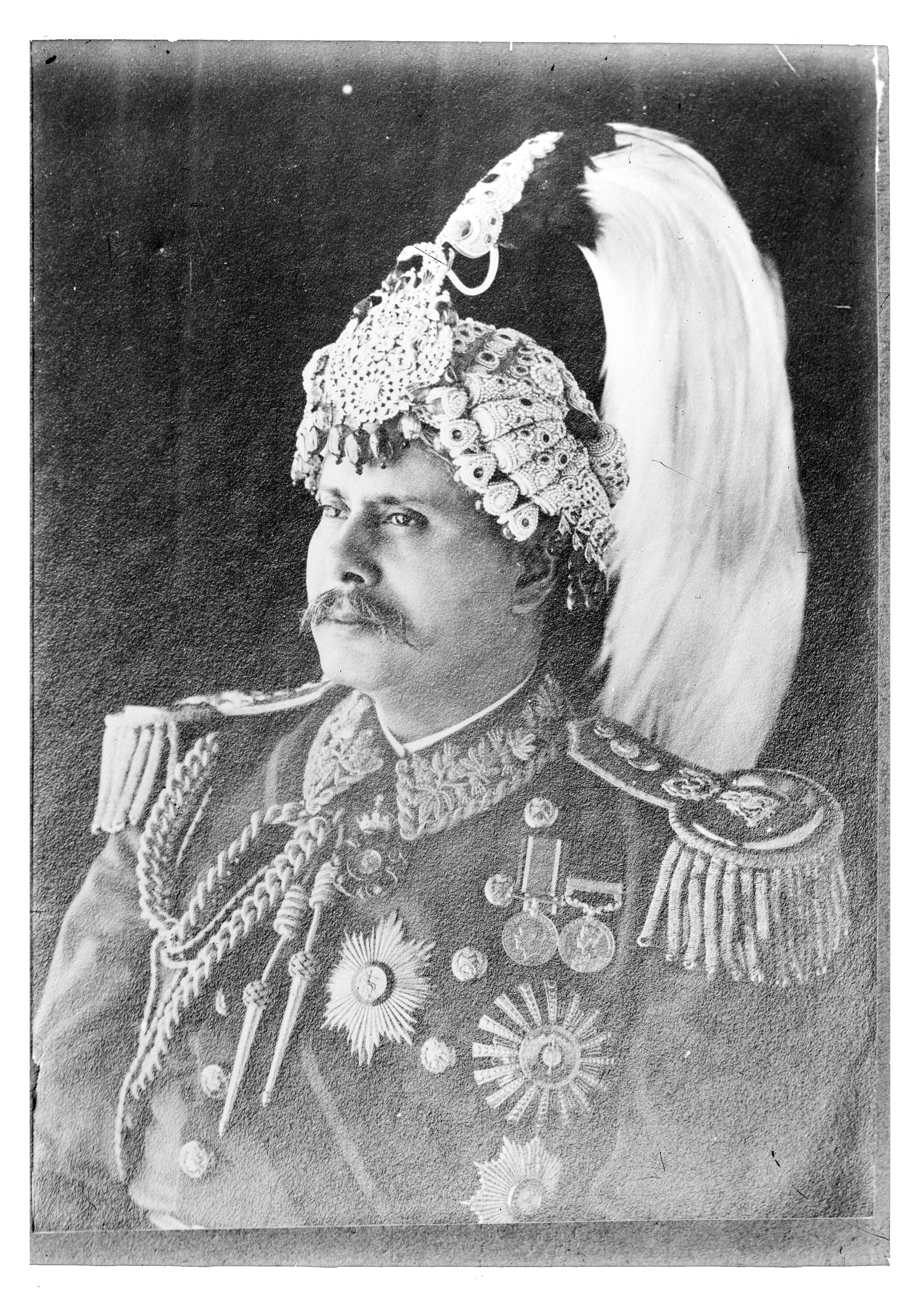
HH Maharaja Padma Shumsher Jung Bahadur Rana

He was the eighth Prime Minister of Nepal from the Rana dynasty and the eighth Maharajah of Lamjang and Kaski. He began construction of the first east–west highway in Nepal. The highway was mainly intended to expedite the transport of mail and is also sometimes called Postal Highway. Citing the lack of proper education in Nepal, he sent several teachers to various countries abroad to train. In addition, he also established several schools and colleges including Padmodaya high school and Padma Kanya multiple campus, which was also the first college to be established in Nepal for women. He held the first ever election in the history of Nepal in the form of a municipal election and introduced the Government Act of Nepal on 26, January, 1948, although it was never fully implemented. His title was-

His Highness Field Marshal Supradipta-Manyabara Svasti Sri Madati Prachandra Bhujadandyetyadi Projjwala-Nepala Taradhisha Sri Sri Sri Maharaja Sir Padma Shumsher Jung Bahadur Rana, GCSI, GCIE, GBE, Prime Minister of Nepal, Maharajah of Lamjang and Kaski.

=== Mohan Shumsher Jung Bahadur Rana (1948–1951) ===
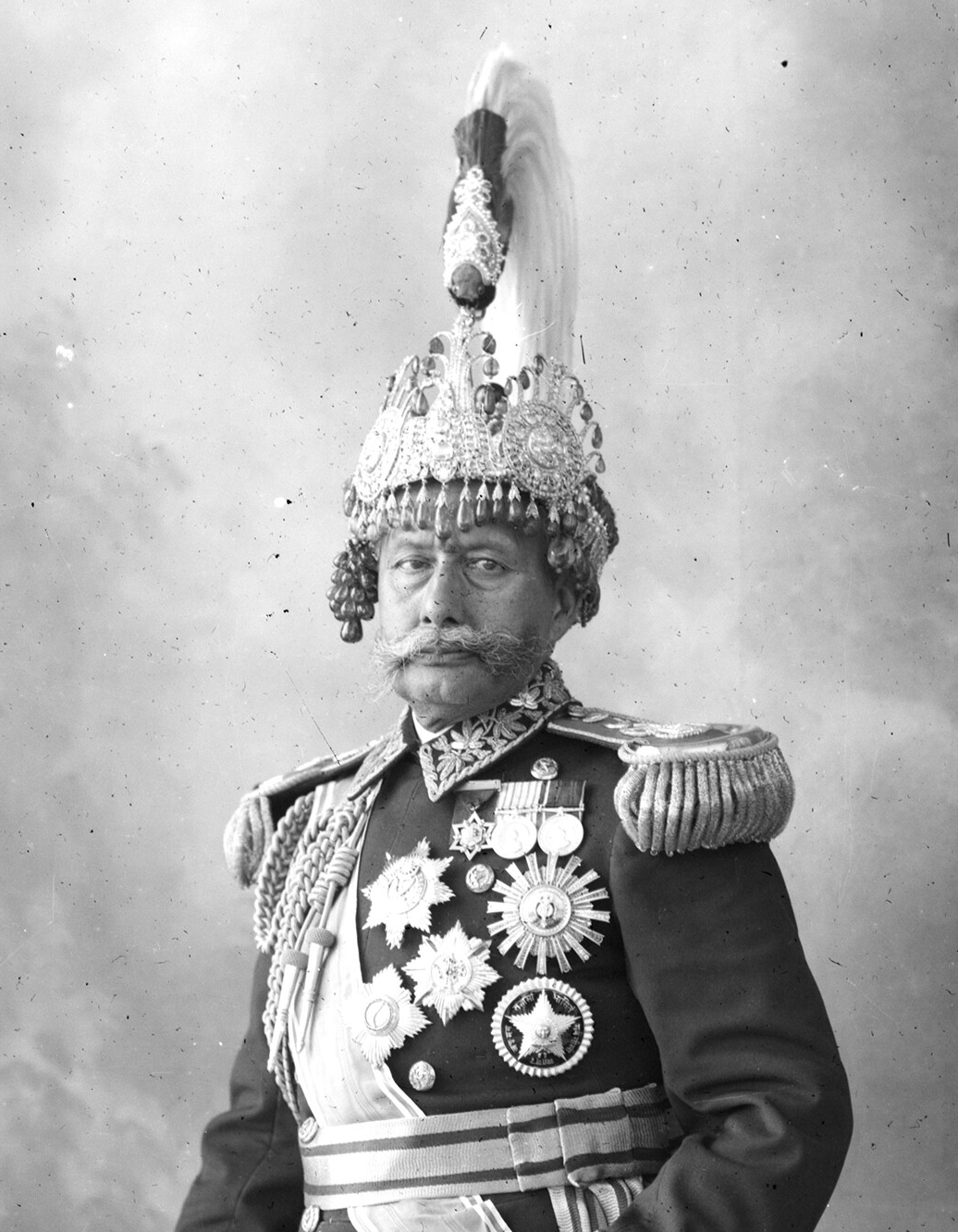
HH Sri Tin Maharaja Mohan Shumsher Jung Bahadur Rana

He was the ninth and last Prime Minister of Nepal from the Rana dynasty and the ninth and last recognised Maharajah of Lamjang and Kaski. He was the Minister of Foreign Affairs, Finance, Water Resources, Panchayat, Transport & Tourism, and Education after the Rana Regime ended. He was in charge of the transferral of power from the Monarchy to democracy in 1990. He had two sons General Maharajkumar Sharada Shumsher Jung Bahadur Rana and General Maharajkumar Bijay Shumsher Jung Bahadur Rana. His title was-

His Highness Field Marshal Supradipta-Manyabara Svasti Sri Madati Prachandra Bhujadandyetyadi Projjwala-Nepala Taradhisha Sri Sri Sri Maharaja Sir Mohan Shumsher Jung Bahadur Rana, GCB, GCIE, GBE, Prime Minister of Nepal, Maharajah of Lamjang and Kaski.

== Titular heads ==
- 1951–1967: His Highness Field Marshal Supradipta-Manyabara Svasti Sri Madati Prachandra Bhujadandyetyadi Projjwala-Nepala Taradhisha Sri Sri Sri Maharaja Sir Mohan Shumsher Jung Bahadur Rana, GCB, GCIE, GBE, Maharajah of Lamjang and Kaski
- 1967–present: His Highness Supradipta-Manyabara Svasti Sri Madati Prachandra Bhujadandyetyadi Shree Shree Shree Maharaja Pashupati Shumsher Jung Bahadur Rana, Shree Tin Maharajah of Lamjung and kaski

== See also ==
- Rana dynasty
- Devyani Rana
- Rana palaces of Nepal
