= Treaty of Trade and Transit of 1960 between India and Nepal =

Treaty of Trade and Transit between India and Nepal

Treaty of Trade and Transit between the Government of India and His Majesty's Government of Nepal, 1960
- Type: Bilateral
- Context: Trade and Trasit
- Location: Kathmandu
- Original signatories: India - Harishwar Dayal, Indian Ambassador; Nepal - Ram Narayan Mishra, Minister for Commerce and Industries (Nepal)
- Parties: Government of India and His Majesty's Government of Nepal
- Languages: English, Hindi and Nepali

Treaty of Trade and Transit of 1960 is a major bilateral treaty or agreement between India and Nepal in the Indian subcontinent. It was signed between the Government of India and His Majesty’s Government of Nepal. The legal agreement of the treaty was to expand economic cooperation, facilitate trade with third countries, and ease the flow of goods between the two nations India and Nepal. It replaced the earlier Treaty of Trade and Commerce in 1950. It was signed on 21 September 1960.

The two governments appointed their plenipotentiaries for the agreement of the treaty. The Government of India appointed its ambassador Harishwar Dayal in Nepal as the plenipotentiary for the treaty. Similarly, His Majesty's Government of Nepal appointed its Minister of Commerce and Industries Ram Narayan Mishra as the plenipotentiary for the treaty. The plenipotentiaries of the treaty from the either side exchanged their full powers to agree on 14 articles at the meeting held on 11 September 1960 in the capital city of Kathmandu in Nepal.

After the treaty came into existence, it is periodically renewed or revised. The recent revision was carried out in the June month of 2023 for seven years. After that it will automatically be renewed for the next seven years.
