= Bhadrakali Mishra =

Nepali politician

- भद्रकाली मिश्र

Minister of Transport
- In office 13 February 1951 – November 1951
- Monarch: King Tribhuvan Bir Bikram Shah Dev
- Prime Minister: Sir Mohan Shamsher Rana
- In office 18 February 1954 – 9 January 1955
- Monarch: King Tribhuvan Bir Bikram Shah Dev
- Prime Minister: Matrika Prasad Koirala

Minister of Public Works (Nepal)
- In office 18 February 1954 – 9 January 1955
- Monarch: King Tribhuvan Bir Bikram Shah Dev
- Prime Minister: Matrika Prasad Koirala

Minister of Communications (Nepal)
- In office 18 February 1954 – 9 January 1955
- Monarch: King Tribhuvan Bir Bikram Shah Dev
- Prime Minister: Matrika Prasad Koirala

Minister of Law and Parliamentary Affairs
- In office 18 February 1954 – 9 January 1955
- Monarch: King Tribhuvan Bir Bikram Shah Dev
- Prime Minister: Matrika Prasad Koirala
- Preceded by: Suryanath Das Yadav
- Succeeded by: Ananda Shamsher

Minister, without portfolio (Nepal)
- In office 10 January 1955 – 9 February 1955
- Monarch: King Tribhuvan Bir Bikram Shah Dev
- Prime Minister: Matrika Prasad Koirala

Chairperson of the Raj Parishad Standing Committee
- In office 1991–1995
- Monarch: King Birendra Bir Bikram Shah Dev
- Preceded by: Office established
- Succeeded by: Dhanendra Bahadur Singh

Personal details
- Born: 6 February 1920 Pipra village, Mahottari District, Nepal
- Died: 1 June 2006 (aged 86) Ranchi, Jharkhand, India
- Party: Nepali Congress,
- Other political affiliations: Nepal Praja Parishad, Nepal Praja Parishad (Mishra), and Terai Congress
- Spouse: Lilawati Mishra
- Children: Three sons
- Education: University of Allahabad

Bhadrakali Mishra (Nepali: भद्रकाली मिश्र; 6 February 1920 – 1 June 2006) was a Nepali politician. In a political career lasting more than 50 years, several of which he spent in exile, he held numerous ministerial portfolios and was also the Chairman of King Birendra's Raj Parishad Standing Committee (the Royal Privy Council of King Birendra) after the establishment of multi-party democracy in 1990.

He also took part in the freedom movement of India, following the non-violent forms of protest advocated by Gandhi. After the partition of India, Bhadrakali Mishra served as a personal assistant to Gandhi, travelled with him and also spent some time at his ashram.

He was first appointed a Nepali minister in 1951 when King Tribhuvan abolished the system of hereditary Prime Ministers from the Rana family and established democracy in Nepal. In the 1950s, Mishra held ministerial portfolios of Communications, Public Works, Transport, and Law and Parliamentary Affairs.

Bhadrakali Mishra went into exile in 1960 when King Mahendra, son of King Tribhuvan banned all forms of political activities and imposed a party-less panchayat system. While in exile, Mishra with his family lived in Patna, Bihar, India and served as the General-Secretary-in-exile of the Nepali Congress as all political activities were banned in Nepal.

He returned to Nepal in 1990 following the success of the first Jana Aandolan (People's Movement) and the restoration of multiparty democracy in 1990. He was subsequently appointed the Chairman of the first Raj Parishad Standing Committee (the Royal Privy Council) by King Birendra.

Mishra died in June 2006 in Ranchi, Jharkhand state, India due to old age and failing health.

== Biography ==
=== Early life ===
Bhadrakali Mishra was born on 6 February 1920 to Dwarika Parshad Mishra (Nepali: द्वारिका प्रशाद मिश्र) and Ram Ratan Kuwari (Nepali: राम रत्न कुँवरी) in the village of Pipra in Mahottari District, located in the southern plains of Nepal.

Owing to the absence of schools in his native district, he underwent early education at a local school in Sitamarhi, Bihar, India. Either during his final years of school or shortly thereafter, he was married to the daughter of Bishwanath Prasad Mishra, a renowned criminal lawyer from Chhapra, India. After his school studies, Bhadrakali Mishra enrolled at the law school at University of Allahabad.

=== 1940–1949 ===
While at the University, Bhadrakali Mishra became active in student politics, following the non-violent forms of protest advocated by Gandhi. He became an active member of the Indian National Congress and took part in numerous protests against the British Regime.

On 9 August 1942, during one such protest in Patna, Bhadrakali Mishra was arrested and imprisoned at the Bankipur Jail along with senior leaders such as Dr. Rajendra Prasad, who incidentally was a close friend of his father-in-law. From Bankipur Jail, Mishra was transferred to Hazaribagh Central Prison.

After his release from prison in 1945, Mishra resumed his studies and remained active in the freedom movement. He graduated with a degree in law (Bachelors of Law) from the University of Allahabad, and then went on to complete his post-graduate degree in English literature from Patna University.

In 1948, Bhadrakali Mishra served as a personal assistant to Gandhi and travelled with him on visit to a number of villages in Bihar that were affected by the communal violence erupting after the partition of India. Mishra also spent some time with Gandhi at his ashram.

=== 1950–1960 ===
Sometime in 1948 or 1949, Bhadrakali Mishra returned to Nepal and in 1950, established Lok Sewak Sangh along Gandhian lines (translation: Association of the Servants of the People) in Janakpurdham. The Sangh organised prayer meetings, cleaned temples and other public places, and worked to provide relief to people affected by natural disasters, such as fires. The organisation was also successful in raising the general level of awareness of the local population in Mahottari.

In April or May 1950, while organising a relief programme for victims of the fire, Bhadrakali Mishra, along with his cousin Ram Narayan Mishra and other Sangh workers were arrested and imprisoned. This incident sparked protests which far-flung and ill-staffed police posts could not contain and the local administration capitulated and released those who were arrested, including Mishra. After his release, Bhadrakali Mishra moved to Kathmandu.

Bhadrakali Mishra's arrival in Kathmandu coincided with the popular movement against the Rana regime, a system hereditary Prime Ministers hailing from the Rana dynasty, that had reduced the ruling Shah monarchy to nominal figureheads and consolidated all powers within the office of the Prime Minister. A number of factors that included Mishra's closeness to the prominent leaders of the Indian Freedom Struggle, an Indian ambassador who knew of his history with the struggle, King Tribhuvan's strong inclination and belief in democracy, and Mishra's presence in Kathmandu propelled him to a central position and a key figure in the movement.

Meanwhile, as the movement against the Rana grew in strength, relations between BP Koirala, brother of Matrika Prasad Koirala—who would become the first Prime Minister of Nepal after the overthrow of the Ranas, and Mishra started to strain. In his autobiography, Atmabrittanta, BP Koirala wrote of his disagreements with Bhadrakali Mishra due to the latter's opposition to Nepali Congress starting an armed struggle for overthrowing the Rana Regime. Koirala added that Mishra continuously insisted that the struggle should fully be along Gandhian lines, including at formal party meetings.

Tensions between the Ranas and the King grew and peaked in early November 1950 that ultimately led to the King seeking refuge at the Indian Embassy. On the morning of 10 November, two Indian aircraft arrived in Kathmandu and the royal family, along with the Indian Ambassador and Bhadrakali Mishra left for the Indian capital Delhi where they were received with full honours by President Dr. Rajendra Prasad, Prime Minister Jawaharlal Nehru and Commander-in-Chief General Cariappa. The King, assisted by Mishra and other close confidants, held a number of meetings with very senior and influential people and garnered overwhelming support for his efforts to establish democracy in Nepal.

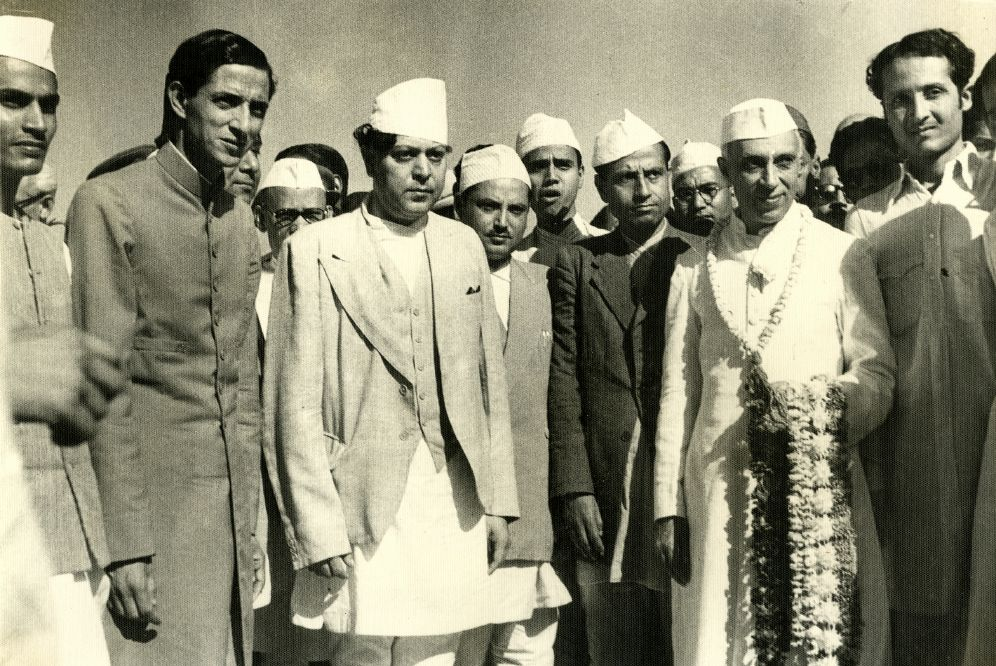
Bhadrakali Mishra (far left) along with King Tribhuvan of Nepal (third left) and Jawaharlal Nehru, Prime Minister of India (second right), and BP Koirala (second left) at Delhi Airport, 1951

With full support of the Indian political and military leadership, and absolute popular support back home for democracy in Nepal, King Tribhuvan returned to the country. Shortly thereafter, on 18 February 1951, he proclaimed an end to the Rana dynasty and announced the establishment of democracy in Nepal. For the transition, the King appointed a joint Rana-Congress cabinet, headed by Mohan Shumsher. Bhadrakali Mishra, representing the Nepali Congress was allocated the portfolio the Minister of Transport; the new cabinet, including Mishra, were sworn in the same day.

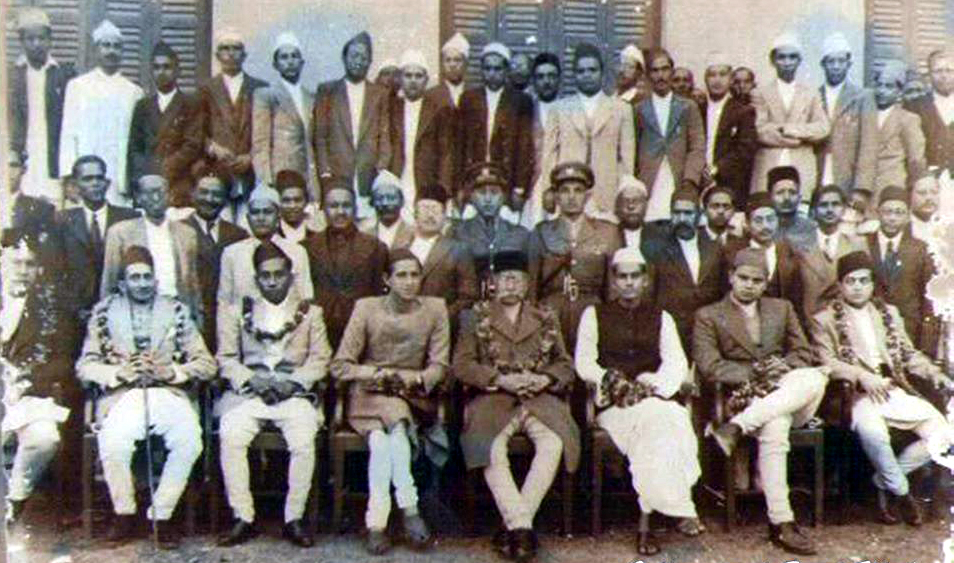
Bhadrakali Mishra (first row, third from the right) seated with Prime Minister Mohan Shamsher to his right, in this group photograph of the Rana-Congress coalition Cabinet.

As the Minister of Transport, Mishra played a key role in the response and relief work following massive floods in the Terai region in 1951, personally visiting the affected districts and overseeing rescue efforts and disbursement of relief material and cash. He also met with senior political leaders to secure their cooperation with government agencies for relief operations irrespective of political differences.

He also undertook official trips to China, India and East Pakistan (now: Bangladesh) to explore avenues of strengthening Nepal's connectivity with its neighbours.

In the meantime, relations between BP Koirala and Bhadrakali Mishra did not warm considerably. In a defining moment at the party's Fifth General Convention in Janakpur in 1952, where Koirala was campaigning strongly for being elected the party's President as well as posturing himself as the next prime minister, Mishra spoke out very strongly and critically against Koirala's proposal and stressed that the same person should not be both the Prime Minister and the chief of a political party. Tensions overflow and culminated in Mishra, along with some other leaders of the Nepali Congress walking out of the meeting venue, boycotting the Convention and announcing a new political party, called the Terai Congress.

Historians believe that despite the differences Koirala maintained a "deep respect" for Mishra. Behind the scenes, many senior leaders worked to reconcile the differences between the two. These efforts ultimately led to the reunification of Terai Congress and Nepali Congress a few years later.

In subsequent years, Mishra was re-inducted in the cabinet and held numerous ministerial portfolios. But the differences between him and Koirala continued to surface time and again. The differences resulted in Mishra writing notes of dissent to many decisions taken by Koirala as the President of Nepali Congress and ultimately led to Mishra leaving the party again and also subsequently resigning from the Cabinet.

Following differences with the Nepali Congress, Bhadrakali Mishra and Tanka Prasad Acharya split from the party and reactivated the Nepal Praja Parishad (translation: Nepal People's Council) that was established circa 1945 against the Rana regime. However, in 1959, Tanka Prasad and Bhadrakali contested the elections separately, as duly recognised as national parties by the Election Commission of Nepal. Bhadrakali Mishra's party, Nepal Praja Parishad (Mishra fraction), contesting 36 seats won 1 while the Acharya faction, contesting 46, won 2.

=== 1960–1990 ===
In December 1960, King Mahendra proclaimed all executive powers in the country and banned all forms of political activities. Following this "coup", the administration swiftly arrested a huge number of political leaders who would to be "tried for treason and receive due punishments." To escape arrest and imprisonment, Bhadrakali Mishra, along with his family fled Nepal and went to India.

Following the developments back home, Nepali political leaders in exile in India started to raise attention to the situation in Nepal and started gathering together. On 25 January 1961, the Nepali Congress, then in exile, held a general convention in Patna, Bihar and Subarna Shamsher, its senior leader, formally announced a struggle against the autocratic King and his regime. The convention also elected Rana as the President of Nepali Congress-in exile. About a month later, on 26 February 1961, Bhadrakali Mishra formally merged his own party, the Nepal Praja Praishad with the Nepali Congress. Shortly thereafter, he was also appointed the General Secretary of the Nepali Congress. Other political parties, such as Samyukta Prajatantra Party, Nationalist Gorkha Parishad, Gorkha Parishad, Nepal Terai Congress, and Terai Congress also merged with the Nepali Congress in due course.

Mishra undertook a number of activities to protest the situation in Nepal. In one such protest, held in Muzaffarpur, Bihar, Mishra spoke about the role of media that had also sided with the King. His statements were suppressed by media in Nepal but Indian media widely reported on the subject, resulting in further highlighting of the situation in Nepal in both national and regional press and radio. In the years that followed, Mishra gave a number of interviews and wrote a number of opinion pieces in major Indian newspapers on political repression and curtailment of civil rights in Nepal.

In December 1976, King Birendra decreed that Mishra, along with 11 other senior political leaders, all in exile in India, will be pardoned. In doing so, he reiterated that the pardon and any subsequent participation in the panchayat system was possible for those who accepted the basic rules of the system. Mishra issued a press statement thanking the King but did not endorse the panchayat system. Instead he welcomed "the opportunity to dedicate himself to the service of his compatriots." Other leaders, such as B.P. Koirala and Ganesh Man Singh however decided to return to Nepal to seek national reconciliation on terms more acceptable to the Nepali Congress. Following the pardon, Mishra briefly visited his hometown, Pipra, to perform some religious services on the death of a family member and thereafter returned.

However, despite the 1976 royal pardon, a single member bench of the Supreme Court of Nepal, in February 1977 passed death sentences on a number of senior political leaders, including Bhadrakali Mishra, Girija Prasad Koirala and Ganesh Man Singh for their involvement in an attack on the district of Okhaldhunga. On this verdict, B.P. Koirala, who was at the time imprisoned at the Sundarijal Prison, wrote in his memoirs Pheri Sundarijal (Jail Diary 2033-34): It remained unclear whether the 1976 royal pardon to Mishra applied to this case. But as a result of the 1980 general amnesty announced by the King, Mishra and other leaders were exonerated of the charge of attack on Okhaldhunga.

"Today's Rising Nepal carried the news of confirmation by the Supreme Court of death sentences passed by one man tribunal. What is intriguing is that BK Mishra was also involved in the statement of Capt Yagya Bahadur Thapa. This news says that Captain has made the statement before the trial court that by a joint direction of Girija, GM and BK, he was made the leader of the group that went to capture Okhaldhunga and set up a parallel govt there. I can understand GM and GP but why BK? What is the purpose of the govt in getting this statement from Capt Thapa? BK has recently been given amnesty and had only less than 2 months ago come to Kathmandu to test the validity of the amnesty. He has been pardoned-does amnesty granted to him extend to this case also in which he has been involved?"

— B.P. Koirala, Pheri Sundarijal (Jail Diary 2033-34)

In 1979, King Birendra announced that a national referendum would be held and the population would be offered the choice between the non-partisan panchayat system and a multi-party system. While a number of political leaders cautiously welcomed the announcement, Mishra spoke very critically on the matter. He questioned the fairness of the vote and expressed particular concern on the issue of citizenship for the Nepali population inhabiting the Terai region as it practically disenfranchised close to two million people. The issue of citizenship was largely not addressed and the referendum was ultimately held on 2 May 1980 with a voter turnout of 66.9%. The panchayat system received a slim majority of 54.8%.

On 13 April 1980, King Birendra announced a general amnesty to all political prisoners and exiles. A few days later, it was confirmed by the Home Ministry that Mishra was one of the political exiles to be granted amnesty. This paved way for him to freely return to Nepal although he was still barred from any political activates in the country. Following the amnesty, Mishra would visit Kathmandu frequently but remained in India where he continued to advocate for greater political and civil freedom in Nepal.

=== 1990–1995 ===
Bhadrakali Mishra returned full-time to Nepal in August 1990 after the success of the 1990 popular movement. The movement brought an end to absolute monarchy and established a democracy with the King retaining a ceremonial role. (See also People's Movement I (1990))

Bhadrakali Mishra (right) with Ganesh Man Singh, at Mishra's house in Kathmandu a few days after his return from exile in India.

In late December 1990, Mishra was granted an audience by King Birendra at the Narayanhiti Palace where the two reportedly discussed the establishment of democracy and transition from an absolute to constitutional monarchy. It was at this meeting that the King reportedly asked Mishra if he would be willing to serve as the Chairman of his Raj Parishad (Privy Council). Bhadrakali Mishra agreed and, on 17 February 1991, was appointed to the position. He was administered the oath of office and secrecy by the King on the morning of 19 February 1991, Nepal's Prajatantra Diwas (Democracy Day).

The Raj Parishad was a body bestowed with a lot of power by the Constitution of Nepal (1990). According to the constitution (Article 34), chairman of the Raj Parishad had the authority to convene a meeting of the council to run matters of the state in the event of the demise of the king, should the king proclaim his abdication, or the king be mentally or physically unable to perform his functions.

In May 1991, Mishra travelled as the personal representative of King Birendra to pay respects on the death of former prime minister of India Rajiv Gandhi. The official Nepalese delegation was led by Prime Minister Prime Minister Lokendra Bahadur Chand.

In late January and early February 1992, Bhadrakali Mishra undertook an official visit to the United States of America as the personal representative of King Birendra to meet with President George H. W. Bush, senior officials of the US Government, the House Committee on Foreign Affairs, and other officials and dignitaries at Washington, D.C. During this visit he also attended the National Prayer Breakfast on 30 January 1992.

In early July 1992, Bhadrakali Mishra travelled to Thailand at the invitation of Sanya Dharmasakti, the then president of the Privy Council of Thailand. During this visit he undertook discussions with his counterpart at the Privy Council of Thailand and with other senior Thai Government officials on strengthening relations between Nepal and Thailand as well as the development of Lumbini, the birthplace of Gautama Buddha.

In 1994, Bhadrakali Mishra travelled to various parts of the Tibet Autonomous Region of China, visiting many border crossings that could be developed to strengthen trade and transit between Nepal and China. During this trip, in addition to meeting with border, customs and trade officials, Mishra also met with senior officials of both the Region's administration as well as with senior members of the Chinese Communist Party. He also visited the Consulate of Nepal in Lhasa. Mishra's was the first official visit to any part of Tibet Autonomous Region of China by a senior Nepalese dignitary since the establishment of democracy in Nepal (in 1990).

=== 1996–2006 ===
Following the end of his term as the Chairman of the Royal Privy Council Standing Committee, Bhadrakali Mishra returned to his village Pipra in the Terai. He engaged in a number of local and small-scale social initiatives. He financed, from his personal accounts, repair and preventative maintenance of the Pipra high-school and its Dwarika-Vijay-Lilawati Chhatrawas (hostel). He also reactivated the Basahiya village-based Gandhi Sewa Ashram started a number of programmes aimed at social upliftment, education and women empowerment (Bhadrakali Mishra, Pundit Ramakant Jha, Ram Narayan Mishra and Mahendra Narayan Nidhi had established the Ashram in 1953).

He strongly advocated the need for and importance of women's empowerment, effective social security structures for widows and orphans, meaningful and remunerated employment for women, and proper education of girls. He financed tuition scholarship for one girl and one boy in Pipra village, each year, for the duration of their school years on condition that they continue formal schooling until they graduated high school. He also accompanied local NGO workers to rural Terai villages to speak to parents and impress upon them the need to educate their children, particularly their daughters.

In his retired life, he also undertook religious pilgrimages to locations of religious and educational importance, visiting Puri, Kanya Kumari, Delhi, Varanasi, Allahabad, Calcutta, Badrinath and Kedarnath in India.

From 2003 onwards, owing to poor health and the need for regular medical care, Bhadrakali Mishra moved back to Kathmandu and lived with his son Ajay and his family. He made yearly trips to Ranchi where in addition to being with his youngest son, Vinay, he also underwent regular medical check-ups. He frequently travelled to Delhi and Mauritius to visit his grandchildren.

Bhadrakali Mishra died in Ranchi on 1 June 2006 due to old age. As per his wishes, his last rites were performed as per the Arya Samaj rituals and his ashes were immersed in the Ganges in Varanasi, India.

=== Social and political legacy ===
Following his passing, the Nepali Congress unanimously approved a condolence motion that was sponsored by late Girija Prasad Koirala, the then President of the Nepali Congress and care-taker Prime Minister of Nepal. Speaking at the meeting, Koirala noted that in Mishra's demise, the nation had lost a statesman and a true democrat. Condolence messages were also delivered by the Ambassadors of China, Japan and India, and numerous political activists and civil society members.

He was also often cited as one of the only representatives of the marginalised and impoverished Terai/Madhesh community in the Governance and political structures in Kathmandu.

On the eve of the promulgation of the Constitution of Nepal-2015, Nepali civil society leaders including Sushil Pyakurel, Kapil Shrestha, Dharmendra Jha, Charan Prasai, Dinesh Tripathi, and many others issued a statement recalling the contributions of and paying homage to Bhadrakali Mishra, along with leaders including B.P. Koirala, Tanka Prasad Acharya, Pushpalal Shrestha, Madan Bhandari, Mahendra Narayan Nidhi and Gajendra Narayan Singh as "dreamers of a democratic Nepal."

== Personal life ==
Bhadrakali Mishra was born on 6 February 1920 to Dwarika Parshad Mishra (Nepali: द्वारिका प्रशाद मिश्र) and Ram Ratan Kuwari (Nepali: राम रत्न कुँवरी) in the village of Pipra in Mahottari District, located in the southern plains.

Sometime in his late-teens, Bhadrakali Mishra was married to Lilawati Mishra (Nepali: लीलावति मिश्र), the daughter of Bishwanath Prasad Mishra from Chhapra, Bihar, India. His father-in-law, Bishwanath Prasad was a close friend of the first President of India, Dr. Rajendra Prasad. By profession, he was a defence lawyer, primarily for criminal cases during the British Raj. They had three sons, Vijay, Ajay and Vinay.

Bhadrakali Mishra had an elder brother, Gunjakali Mishra, and a younger brother, Jwala Prasad Mishra. One of his cousins, Shyam Nandan Prasad Mishra, served as the Minister of External Affairs of India from 28 July 1979 to 13 January 1980.

Mishra did not subscribe to the notions of the caste hierarchy. Influenced by Gandhian ideals, he actively advocated for an end to caste system, in particular the practice of untouchability. Upon his retirement from public life, Mishra often visited the homes of the so called "lower castes" in and around his village, and shared meals with them.

== Honors ==
Some of the prominent honours bestowed upon Bhadrakali Mishra included:

- Suprasidha Prabala Gorkha Dakshina Bahu (The Most Puissant Order of the Gurkha Right Arm) for most exceptional and highly invaluable services rendered to the nation and to the monarchy, 1995.
- Birendra Rajat Jayanti Padak (King Birendra Silvery Jubilee Medal), special coronation medal for services rendered to the nation during the reign of His Majesty King Birendra Bir Bikram Shah Dev, 1997.
- Birendra-Aishwarya Sewa Padak (King Birendra-Queen Aishwarya Service Medal) for dedicated and trustworthy services rendered to King Birendra and the monarchy during his reign, 2002.
