= Ram Narayan Ayodhya Higher Secondary School, Pipara =

Ram Narayan Ayodhya Higher Secondary School
- राम नारायण अयोध्या उच्च माध्यमिक विद्यालय
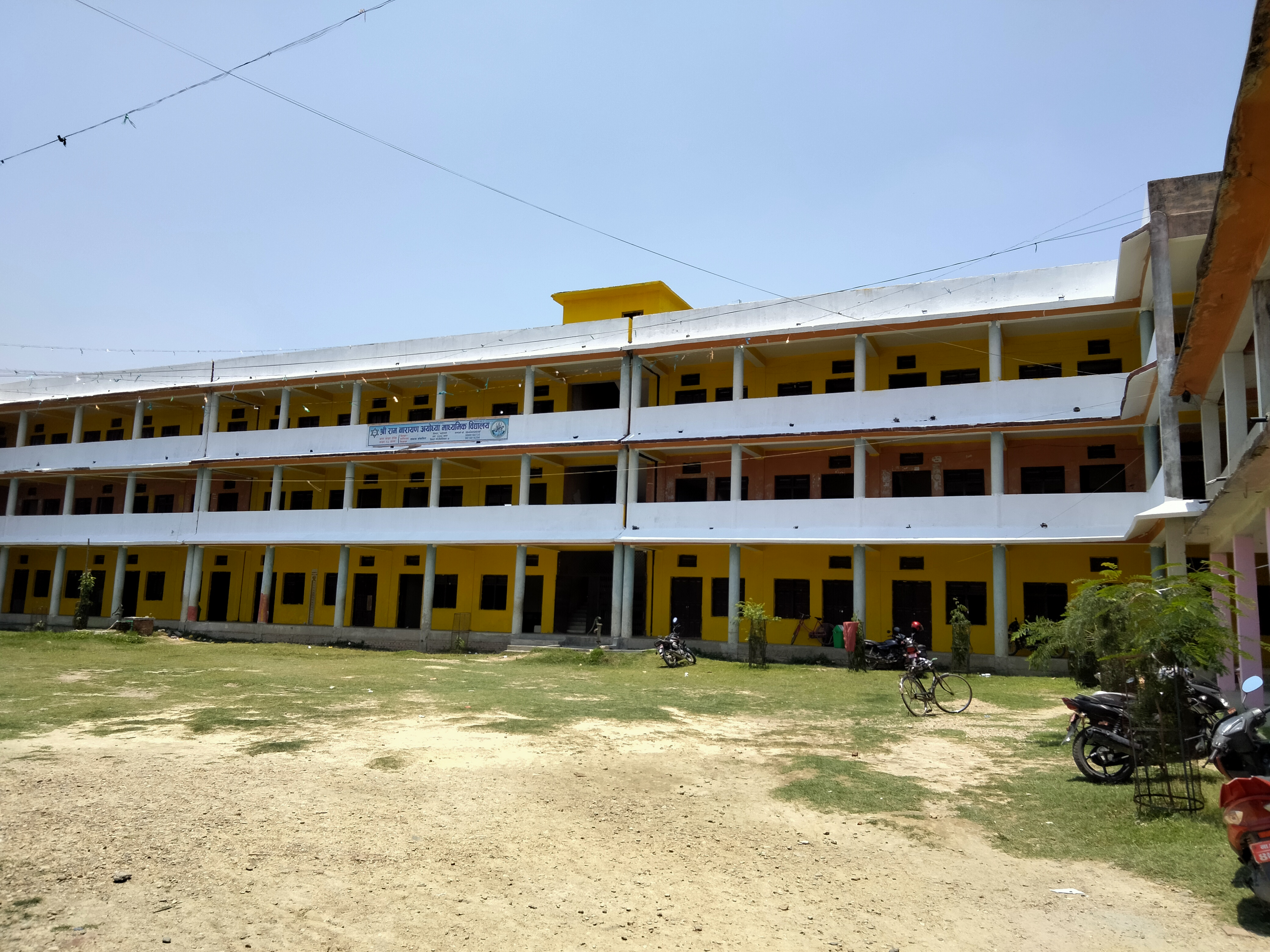
- Main Building of the School

Location
- Pipara, Mahottari district Madhesh Pradesh; Nepal
- Coordinates: 26.68086°N 85.85622°E

Information
- Other name: R N A Higher Secondary School
- Type: Government School
- Established: Bikram Sambat 2003
- Founder: Ram Narayan Mishra
- Educational authority: District Education Officer
- School code: 180570002
- Head teacher: Pramod Mandal
- Language: English and Nepali
- Campus: Permanent
- Slogan: तमसोमा ज्योतिर्गमय (From darkness lead me to light)
- Mascot: तमसोमा ज्योतिर्गमय
- Nickname: Pipara High School
- Affiliation: SEE, HSEB
- Alumni: Former Headmaster-Raj Kishor Jha

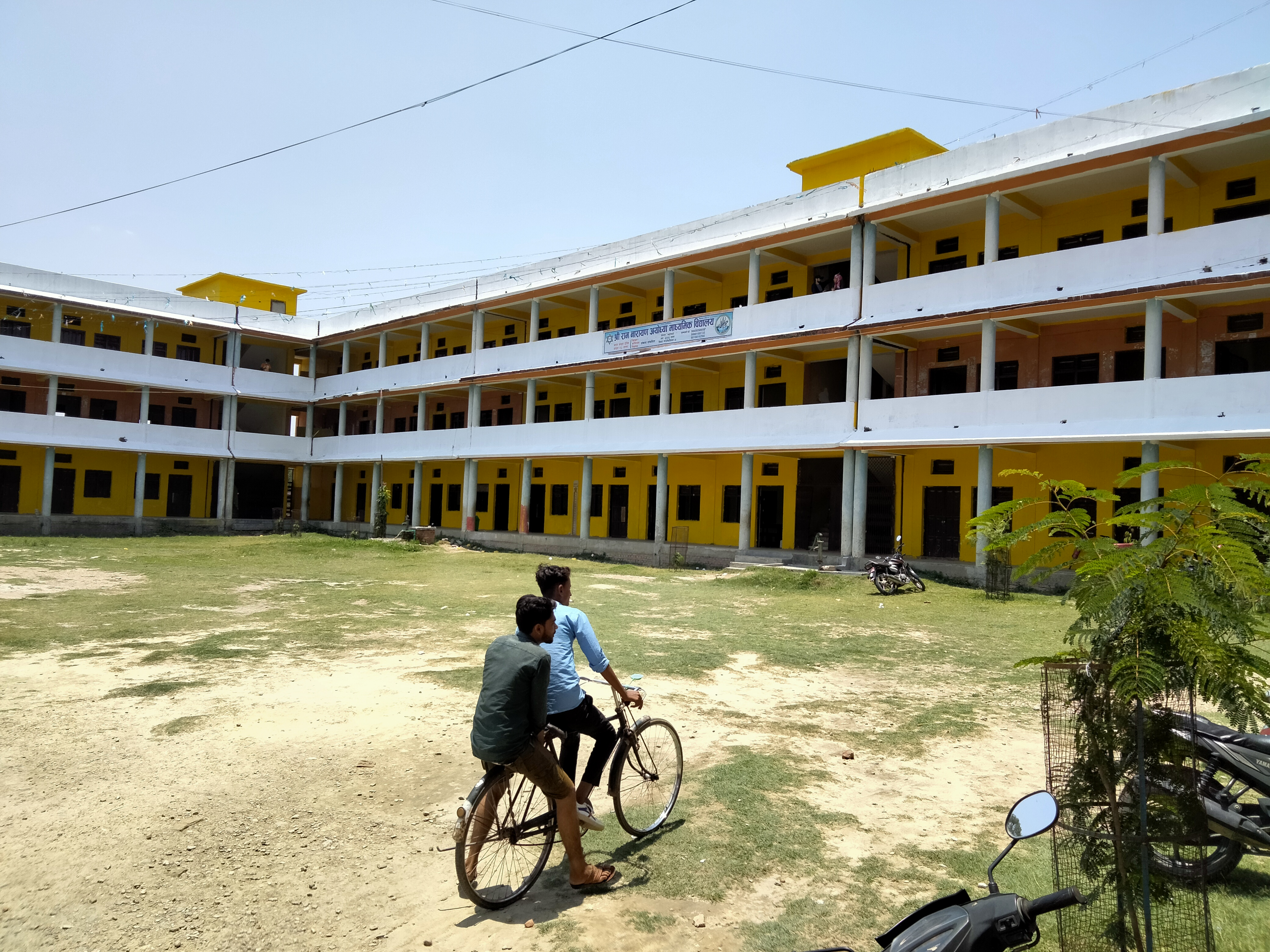
Shree Ram Narayan Ayodhya Higher Secondary School, Pipara, Nepal

Ram Narayan Ayodhya Higher Secondary School (राम नारायण अयोध्या उच्च माध्यमिक विद्यालय) is a higher secondary school located in Pipara Rural Municipality of Mahottari district in Nepal. It is situated on the outskirts of Pipara village in the Mahottari district of Nepal. The school offers education up to the junior college level in Management, Science, and Education streams. The school is affiliated with the National Examination Board (NEB) of Nepal. It is a government-run higher secondary school in Nepal. The school’s new building was constructed with the support of Indian Embassy in Nepal. Indian Consul General Gururaj Rao laid the foundation stone for the school’s new building on 23 November 2006. This school comes under Indo-Nepal Friendship Corporation. It is one of the most important schools in the region. The school’s motto is "From darkness, lead me to light". The founder of the school was Ram Narayan Mishra. He was the former Minister for Industry and Commerce in the Royal government of Nepal in King Mahendra regime. He assumed office as Minister on 27 May 1959.

== Campus ==
It is a higher secondary school with limited amenities.

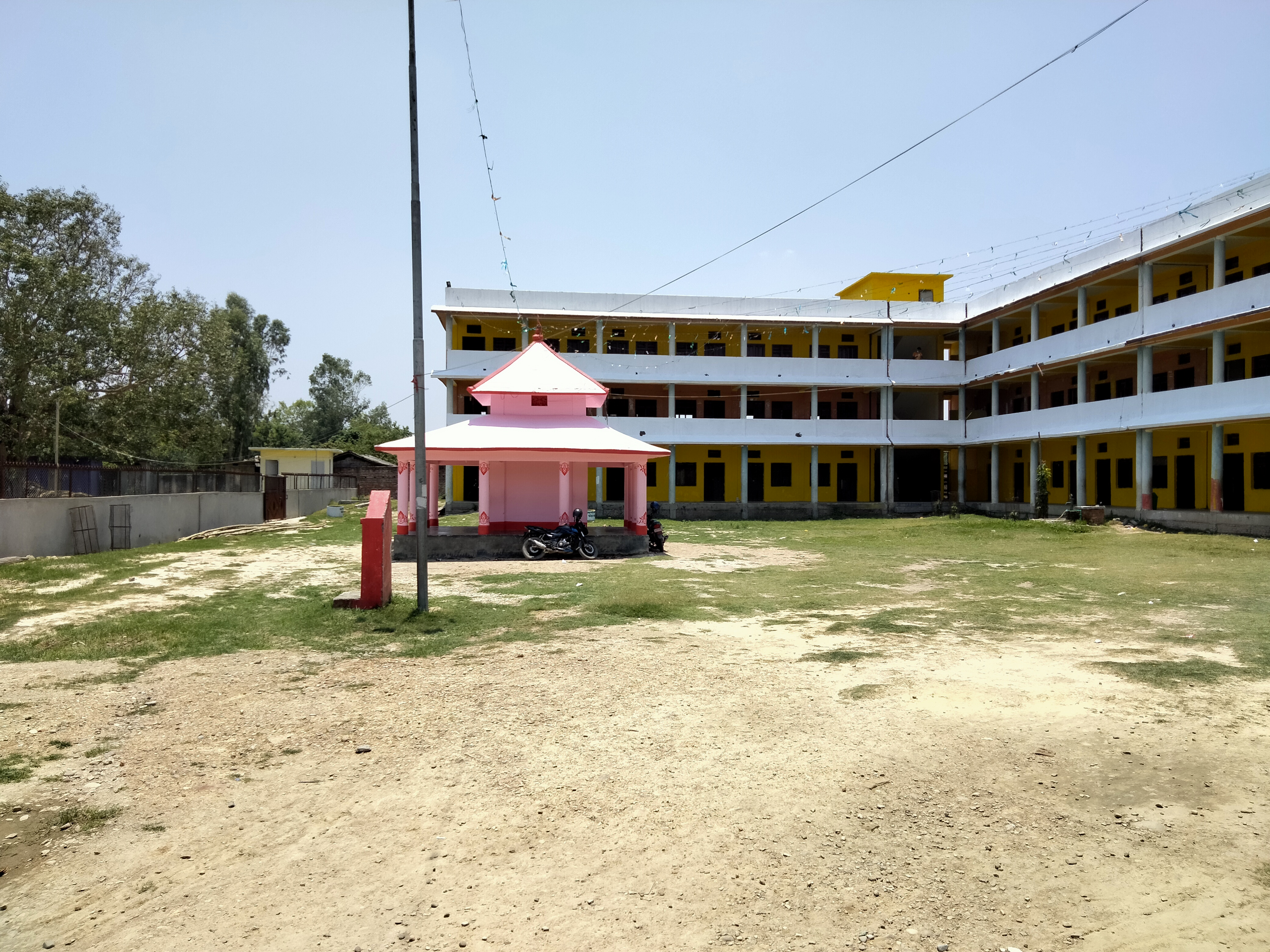
Sarswati Mandir in the campus of Shree Ram Narayan Ayodhya Higher Secondary School, Pipara, Nepal

== Links ==
https://commons.wikimedia.org/wiki/File:Ram_Narayan_Ayodhya_Higher_Secondary_School.jpg
