= Basikhola =

Basikhora बासीखोरा
- Municipality
- Location in Nepal
- Coordinates: 27.04°N 87.04°E
- Country: Nepal
- Province: Province No. 1
- District: Bhojpur District

Population (1991)
  - Total: 4,251
- Time zone: UTC+5:45 (Nepal Time)

Basikhora is a village development committee in Bhojpur District in Province No. 1 of eastern Nepal. At the time of the 1991 Nepal census it had a population of 4251 persons living in 805 individual households.

== Notable people ==
- Ram Prasad Rai, revolutionary, military theorist and army organizer who mysteriously disappeared in 1951
