= Delhi Accord =

Verbal agreement initiative by the Government of India which ended revolution

Delhi Accord was a 1951 tripartite agreement (verbal) in Delhi after mutual agreement between Ranas, Nepali Congress party and King Tribhuban.

== Background ==
The Rana regime of Nepal started in 1846 when Jung Bahadur Rana assumed full power after the Kot massacre. This reduced the status of the king to a mere figurehead and vested all powers in the hands of the hereditary prime ministers of the Rana family. This regime was highly authoritarian, isolationist and oppressive. The Rana prime ministers restricted education to just the members of the Rana family and some other aristocrats, executed and imprisoned any objectors and held the royal family captive. In time, anti-Rana sentiments grew strong among aristocrats who worked with Nepalis living in India to fuel a revolution against the oppressive regime. King Tribhuvan's anti-Rana attitude had been an open secret for a long time in Nepal.

== Aftermath ==
- Mohan Shamsher – Prime minister and Foreign Affairs.
- Baber Shamsher Jang Bahadur Rana – Defence.
- Chudraj Shamsher – Forests.
- Nripa Janga Rana – Education.
- Yagya Bahadur Basnyat – (Rana Bhardar) – Health and Local self-government.:
- Subarna Shamsher Rana – Finance.
- B.P. Koirala – Home.
- Ganesh Man Singh – Commerce and Industry
- Bharatmani Sharma – Food and Agriculture
- Bhadrakali Mishra – Transport.

This cabinet was reshuffled on 10 June 1951 to replace Baber Shamsher by Shangha Shamsher and Bharatmani Sharma by Surya Prasad Upadhyaya
