= Pipra Rural Municipality =

Pipra पिपरा
- Rural Municipality
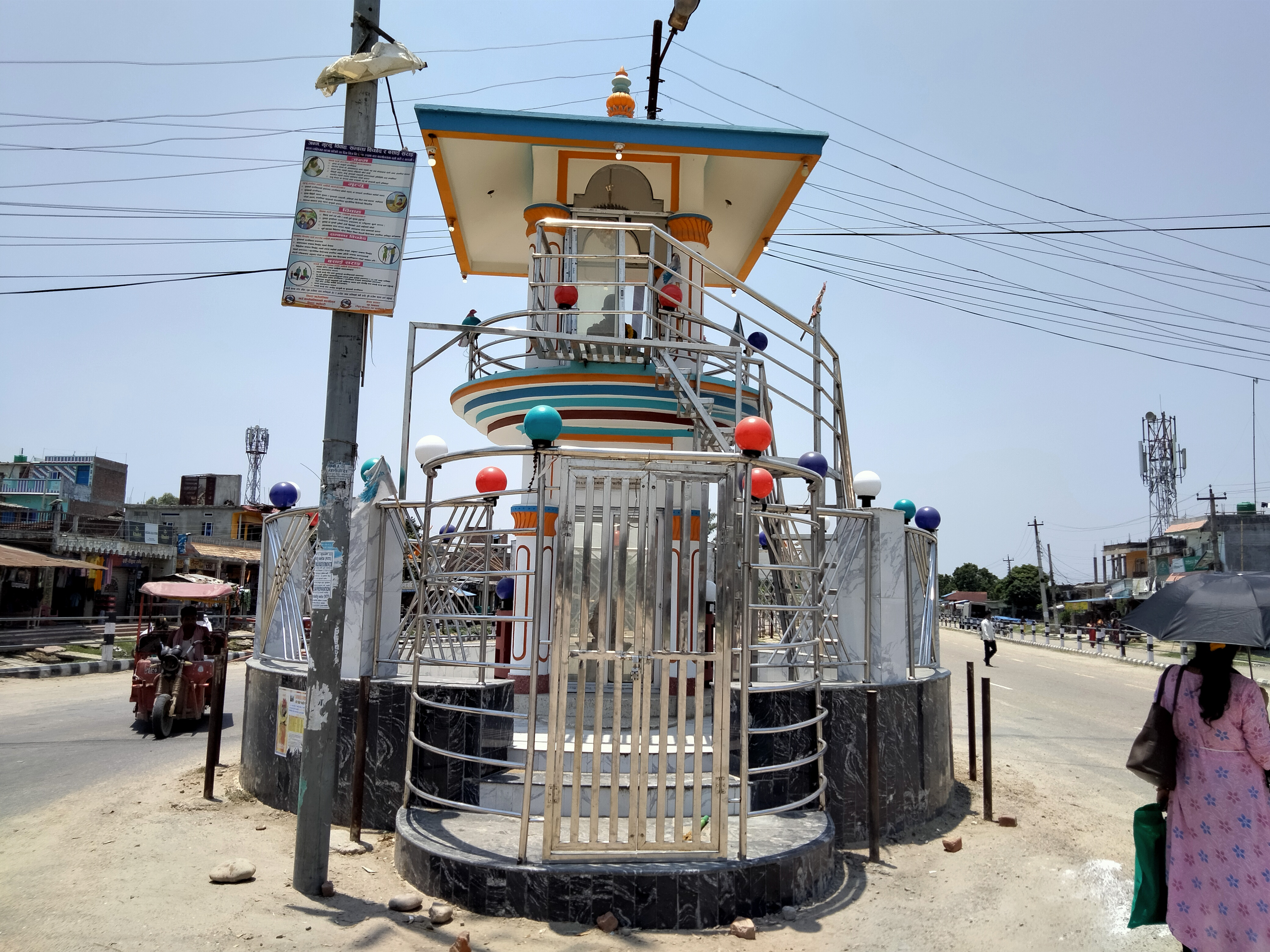
- Ram Narayan Mishra Chowk on the Janakpur - Bhitthamore Highway at Pipara village

- Location in Nepal
- Coordinates: 26.69°N 85.83°E
- Country: Nepal
- Development Region: Central
- Zone: Janakpur
- District: Mahottari District
- Province: Madhesh Province
- Established: 2016 A.D. (2073 B.S.)

Area
  - Total: 39.98 km^{2} (15.44 sq mi)

Population (2021)
  - Total: 40,353
  - Density: 1,009/km^{2} (2,614/sq mi)
  - Religions: Hindu Muslim

Languages
  - Local: Maithili, Nepali
- Time zone: UTC+5:45 (NST)
- Postal Code: 45700
- Area code: 044
- Website: http://www.pipramun.gov.np/

Pipra (पिपरा) is a village in Mahottari District, Janakpur Zone in the Central Region of Nepal.

According to the 2021 census, the population of the village is 40,535 persons, living in 8302 households.

Pipra Rural Municipality consists of 14 villages nearby and the eligible voters of those villages will be voting for the appropriate candidate. The winning candidate will serve the Pipra Rural Municipality as the second president and the job tenure will be of two years as the election is within the tenure of the first.

== Overview ==
Pipra lies about 8 km (5 miles) from Janakpur on the main highway linking it to Jaleswor, the district headquarters of Mahottari District. Its GPS coordinates are: 26° 40' 52.8132 North and 85° 51' 20.0016 East.

== Demographics ==
=== General ===
According to the Village Development Committee/Municipality data from the National Population and Housing Census 2011, Pipra had a total population of 9,373 living in 1,635 households. There are 4,787 males and 4,586 females in the village (Sex ratio: 104.38 males per 100 females).

=== Housing ===
1,624 of the 1,635 households owned the dwelling they resided in. Majority of the houses in the village (887) are of 'wooden-pillar' type, followed, respectively by: cement bonded brick/stone (580), mud bonded brick/stone (119); and 23 houses are reinforced concrete structures.

85% of the households are supplied by water by tube-wells or hand-pumps (1,390) and 11.5% have tap/piped water (189). 0.2% households derived their water from wells (covered or uncovered, 2 each) and 3% had 'other' sources (52).

In terms of sanitation, more than 60% of the households (1,093) do not have toilets. However, of the households that do (526), 71.1% (374) have toilets with flushes installed.

=== Electricity and fuel ===
Pipra is considered generally electrified with good electrical coverage, 61.2% of the households are electrified and use electricity for lighting; 604 households use kerosene wick lamps; importantly, 10 of the 1635 households have solar lighting units installed.

In terms of household fuel, 1,115 households rely on firewood, 343 on cow-dung-cakes (*guitha*), 121 on liquefied petroleum gas (LPG), 21 on kerosene, 9 on bio-gas installations and 26 on 'other' sources.

With 43 households having refrigerators, the village has the second highest number in the district, after the district headquarters, Jaleshwor (a municipality, considered a town).

=== Media and communication ===
513 households in the village have functional radio sets, 716 have working televisions (of which 171 have cable connection, normally through a satellite dish). 44 households have computers of which 6 are connected to the internet. 53 houses have fixed line telephones and 887 have at least one mobile phone.

=== Transport ===
31 of the households have some form of a four-wheeler (including tractors), 173 have motorcycle (or other two wheeled engine driven vehicle) and 8 households having 'some other form of transport', generally implying ox drawn carts or three wheel power-tiller pulling a trailer.

=== Education and language ===
In terms of languages, 9,118 use Maithili as their mother tongue, 123 use Hindi, 89 Magahi, 24 Rai and 19 using 'other' languages.

The village has an overall literacy rate of about 47%. Males have a higher literacy rate than females (56.24% as compared to 37.41%).

== Economy ==
The economy of the village is primarily agrarian, with a few shops and services located near the village centre.

Rastriya Banijya Bank, Citizens Bank, Everest Bank, and various microfinance institutions maintain branches in Pipra that offer lending services to farmers and locals in Pipra and nearby villages.

The local economy of the village has been provided with a major boost by money remitted by migrant workers hailing from the village but now working overseas in the Persian Gulf and Middle East and in South-East Asia. According to conservative estimates, nearly a third of the village's population, particularly those between 18–45 years of age, work in Saudi Arabia, Qatar or Malaysia. Furthermore, there are reports that young men, below the age of 18, some as young as 14, have also traveled for migrant work on forged documents.

== Climate ==
Pipra has all four seasons of the year.

March to August are generally considered as Summer with average temperature in the mid 30-degree Celsius. December and January are generally cold with extended periods of Seet-lahar a period of extended days where fog and low-clouds block the sun resulting in low highs. September–October and February are the Autumn and Spring months, respectively.

== Education ==
Pipra has a government-run high school named as Ram Narayan Ayodhya Higher Secondary School and a few privately run schools.

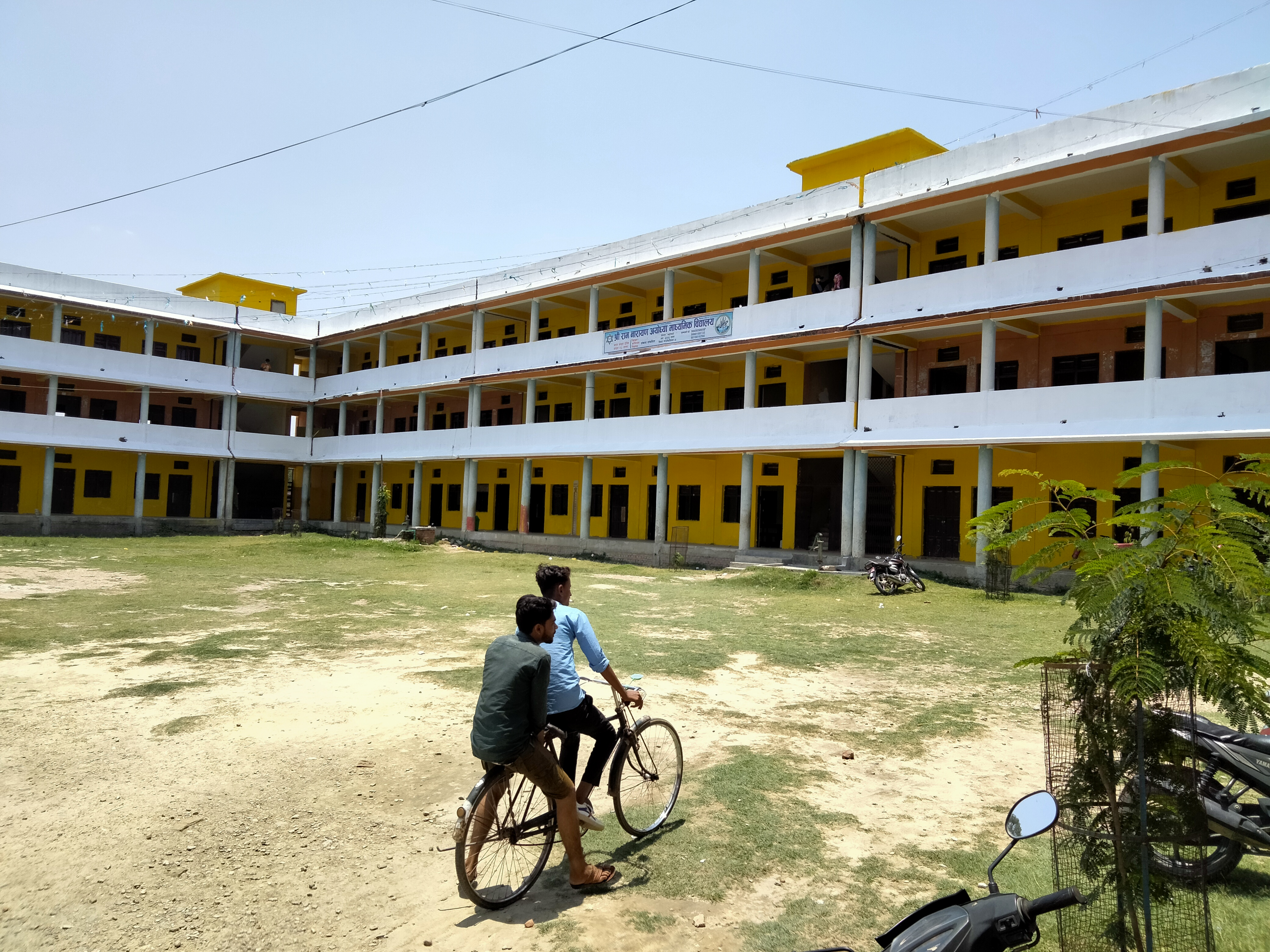
Ram Narayan Ayodhya Higher Secondary School at the outskirt Pipara Village

== Law enforcement ==
There is a small police office in the village comprising about 12 Nepal Police personnel under the command of an Assistant Sub-Inspector (ASI). Furthermore, a Quick Response Team (QRT), comprising 6 personnel in an interceptor vehicle (Tata 407 pickup truck) is permanently based in the village this team coordinates with village police office but takes orders from the District Police Office located in Jaleshwor, the district headquarters.

== Notable people ==
- Vinod Kumar Chaudhary, first President of the Pipra Rural Municipality (established after new federal structure of Nepal)
- Vikram Chaudhary second President of the Pipra Rural Municipality (established after new federal structure of Nepal)
- Ramjanki Yadav Third President of the Pipra Rural Municipality (established after new federal structure of Nepal)
