= Ram Narayan Mishra =

Nepali politician

- राम नारायण मिश्र
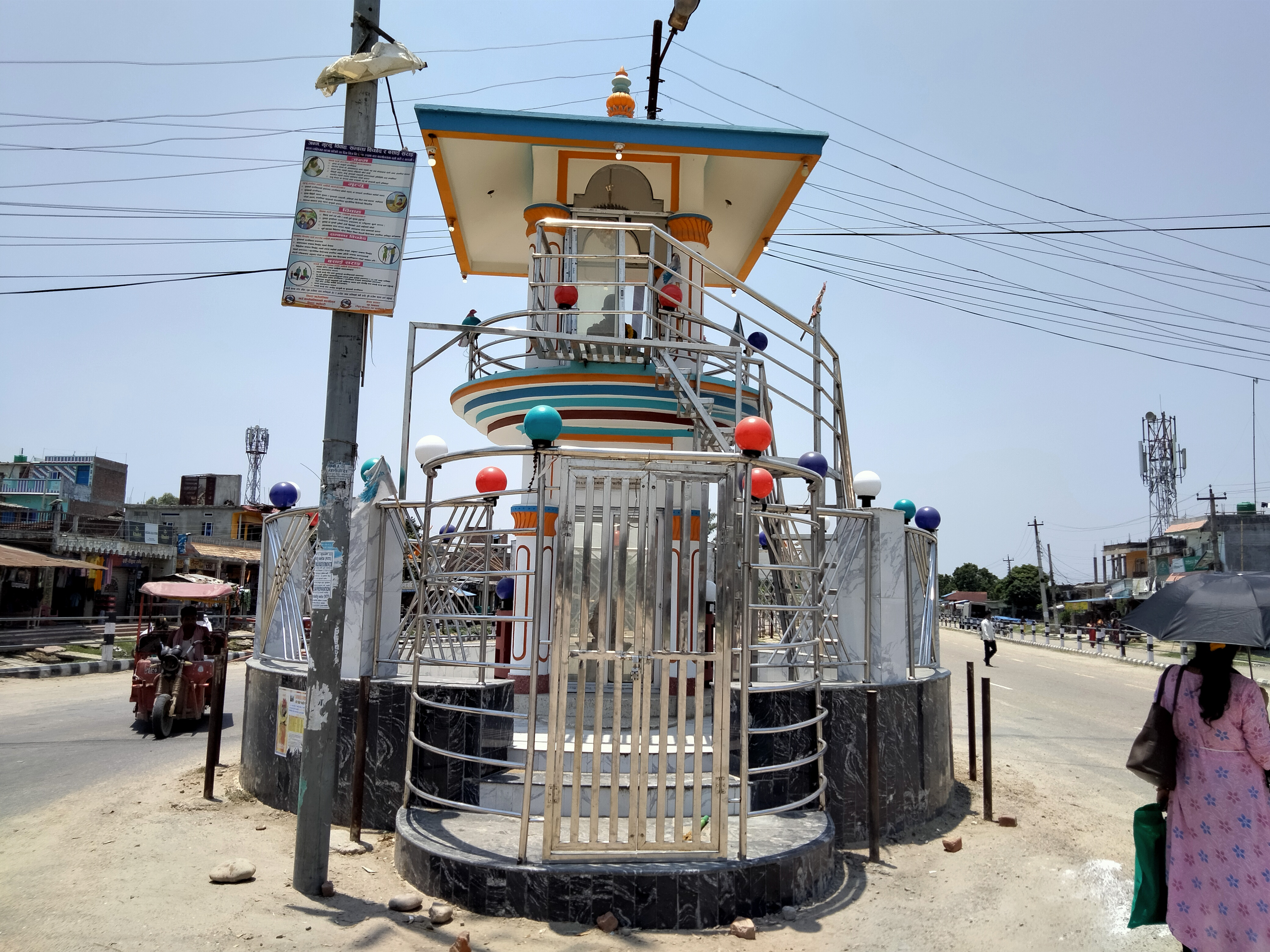
- Memorial statue of Ram Narayan Mishra on the Janakpur - Bhitthamore Highway at Pipra Rural Municipality

Ministry of Industry and Commerce
- In office 27 May 1959 – 15 December 1960
- Appointed by: His Majesty King Mahendra
- Monarch: His Majesty King Mahendra
- Minister: Industry and Commerce
- Succeeded by: Bedananda Jha

Personal details
- Born: 5 June 1922 Pipra village, Mahottari District, Nepal
- Citizenship: Nepalese
- Party: Nepali Congress
- Children: Hari Shankar Mishra
- Occupation: Nepalese Politician
- Cabinet: B.P. Koirala cabinet, 1959
- Plenipotentiary for Treaty of trade and transit between the Government of India and His Majesty's Government of Nepal [1960]

Ram Narayan Mishra was the Minister for Industry and Commerce in the BP Koirala cabinet of 1959. He took his office of the Ministry on 27 May 1959. He was also a democratic fighter of Nepal and a founder member of Nepali Congress. He was the founder of the Janakpur Cigarette Factory Limited. This factory was established with Russian assistance. He was from Pipara village of Mahottari district of Nepal. He also established Ram Narayan Ayodhya Higher Secondary School at Pipara village.

== Description ==
Ram Narayan Mishra was a founding member of the Nepali Congress. During his struggle for the democracy in the country, he also met the then Indian prime minister Pandit Jawahar Lal Nehru in the month of August 1957 for seeking advice on the matter.

He was selected as the plenipotentiary from His Majesty's government of Nepal for Treaty of trade and transit between the Government of India and His Majesty's Government of Nepal [1960]. After signing the treaty, he declared that the Treaty had added new chapter in the economic cooperation between the two nations India and Nepal.

== Legacy ==
Ram Narayan Mishra is remembered as a prominent democratic leader in Nepal. He was a freedom fighter for the democracy in the country. He was selected a member cum minister of the Nepal's first people-elected cabinet in the year 1959.

After Ram Narayan Mishra, his political legacy was carried on by his son Hari Shankar Mishra. His son Hari Shankar Mishra became a member of parliament in Nepal. Later in the year 2021, he became the governor of the Madhesh Pradesh province.
