= Chainpur =

Chainpur may refer to:

== India ==
- Chainpur, Kaimur, Bihar
  - Chainpur Assembly constituency, Kaimur, Bihar
- Chainpur, Saharsa, Bihar
- Chainpur subdivision, Gumla district, South Chotanagpur division, Jharkhand
  - Chainpur block, Gumla
  - Chainpur, Gumla, a village
- Chainpur block, Palamu, Jharkhand

== Nepal ==
- Chainpur, Chitwan, Khairhani Municipality
- Chainpur, Bajhang, Jaya Prithvi Municipality
- Chainpur, Dhading
- Chainpur Municipality, Sankhuwasabha District, Koshi Province

== See also ==
- Chainpura, Bharatpura, Jaipur district, Rajasthan
