= Nepali Congress's Liberation Army =

- नेपाली कांग्रेस मुक्ति सेना
- Country: Nepal
- Allegiance: Nepali Congress

Nepali Congress's Liberation Army (Congress Mukti Sena) was the militant wing of the Nepali Congress Party. Established in 1948, the Sena took part in an armed uprising against the Rana rule in Nepal. Later, the Liberation Army was integrated into the Nepali Police, following the 'Delhi Compromise'.

== See also ==
- Ram Prasad Rai
- Nepali Congress
