= Yagya Bahadur Basnyat =

Nepali politician

- यज्ञ बहादुर बस्न्यात

Minister of Health
- In office 18 February 1951 – November 1951
- Monarch: King Tribhuvan
- Prime Minister: Sir Mohan Shamsher Jang Bahadur Rana

Yagya Bahadur Basnyat (Nepali: यज्ञ बहादुर बस्न्यात) was a Nepalese politician. He was appointed Minister of Health & Local Self Development in the government formed by Sir Mohan Shamsher Jang Bahadur Rana after King Tribhuvan's return to the throne on 18 February 1951 after signing the 'Delhi Agreement' or the Tripartrite agreement. In a cabinet reshuffle on 10 June 1951, he was named Minister of Health in the Interim Coalition government.He was amomg the 5 people that Ranas allocated to handle government from their side. This cabinet lasted until November 1951.
