= Subarna Shamsher Rana =

Nepalese statesman (1910–1977)

- सुवर्ण सम्शेर राणा

Prime Minister of Nepal
- In office 15 May 1958 – 27 May 1959
- Monarch: Mahendra
- Preceded by: Kunwar Indrajit Singh (1957)
- Succeeded by: B. P. Koirala

Deputy Prime Minister of Nepal
- In office 27 May 1959 – 16 December 1960
- Prime Minister: B. P. Koirala

Minister of Finance
- In office 15 May 1958 – 16 December 1960
- Prime Minister: Himself; B. P. Koirala
- Preceded by: C. B. Singh
- Succeeded by: Rishikesh Shah
- In office 21 February 1951 – 14 August 1952
- Prime Minister: Mohan Shumsher JBR; Matrika Prasad Koirala
- Preceded by: Office established
- Succeeded by: Kaiser Shumsher JBR

Member of the House of Representatives
- In office 30 June 1959 – 15 December 1960
- Preceded by: Constituency created
- Succeeded by: Constituency abolished
- Constituency: Bara West—Parsa East

President of the Nepali Congress
- In office 24 January 1956 – 23 May 1957
- Preceded by: B. P. Koirala
- Succeeded by: B. P. Koirala

1st Vice Chancellor of Tribhuvan University
- In office 16 October 1959 – 27 March 1961
- Preceded by: Office established
- Succeeded by: Ran Dhir Subba

Personal details
- Born: 1910 Kathmandu, Nepal
- Died: 9 November 1977 (aged 66–67) Calcutta, India
- Relations: Bhim Shumsher Jung Bahadur Rana (Grandfather)

Subarna Shamsher Rana (Nepali: सुवर्ण सम्शेर राणा) (1910 – 9 November 1977) was a leading figure in the movement to overthrow the ruling Rana oligarchy and to establish democracy in Nepal. He was one of the three leaders of the Nepali Congress in the late 1940s, opposing his relatives, the Rana family, who held power in Nepal at the time.

He is one of the most revered leaders of Nepali Congress. He died in Calcutta on 9 November 1977. Sashi Sumsher and Yog Prasad Upadhyay brought his ashes back to Nepal.

== Personal life ==
Rana was married to Sri Rani Shweta Prabha Rajya Lakshmi. They had three sons and one daughter:

- Lieutenant-Colonel Kanak Shumsher Jung Bahadur Rana.
- Kanchan Shumshere Jang Bahadur Rana. He d. 1973.
- Rukma Shumsher Jang Bahadur Rana. Ambassador of Nepal to India (2009-11). Former Managing director of Dabur Nepal. President of the Nepal Olympic Committee (1998 to 2006). Acting President of the All Nepal Football Association (ANFA), President of Nepal Taekwondo Association, and Nepal Athletics Association.
- Roma Rajyashree Rajya Lakshmi.

== Democratic movement ==
Subarna Shamsher played a crucial role during the movement to attain democracy in Nepal and to remove the Rana rule. He had initially founded the Nepalese Democratic Congress in March, 1948. Its main agenda was to destabilize the Rana regime and to introduce a multi-party democratic system in Nepal

Its operations were run mainly from the Indian state, United Province which is present day Bihar and Uttar Pradesh. In 1950, both Bishweshwar Prasad Koirala and Subarna Shamsher realized that the only way that the movement would succeed would be through the merger of their respective political parties.

The only barrier to this was that, unlike the Nepalese Democratic Congress, the Nepalese National Congress headed by Koirala did not accept violence as a method to achieve democracy. After a string of talks and negotiations Subarna Shamsher made Koirala realize that violence will be needed and thus, the two parties came together to form the Nepali Congress.

After the merger he spearheaded the movement and enabled it to arm and train a small army which then began destabilizing the Rana government in eastern parts of Nepal. The financing for all the activities of the Nepai Congress was done by Subarna Shamsher through his own personal funds.

In late 1950, there was a general mobilization with violent protests and attacks taking place in Birgunj and Biratnagar. With situation getting worse for the Rana governor, the Royal Army eventually retreated from most of eastern Nepal which then came on the control of the Nepali Congress.

This victory was short-lived as the new reinforced Rana forces overpowered the weaker forces of the Nepli Forces and drove them out of Nepal. But the struggle in Easter Nepal had the desired effect and all over Nepal people started rising against the Rana regime. By late 1951, the Rana Prime Minister Mohan Shumsher Jang Bahadur Rana gave into the demands of the Nepali Congress and gave way for the reforms to be carried out by the Congress under the supervision of King Tribhuvan.

== Interim government ==
In 1951, he became the Minister of Finance in the interim Congress-Rana government led by Sir Mohan Shamsher Jang Bahadur Rana. It was during this period that Subarna Shamsher played a crucial role in the formation of the new constitution and establishment of Democracy in Nepal.

As finance minister, he played a vital role in forming the Economic policies of Nepal. These policies are to be said to have garnered appreciation from various world leaders including Nehru. Leading up to the first Democratic Elections, Subarna Shamsher was appointed prime minister, the head of government in Nepal at the time, in 1958 until 1959 when the elections were held.

== Nepalese Legislative Election 1959 ==
Elections were finally held in 1959. Subarna Shaamsher stood up from Birgunj which was a Congress stronghold at the time. The Nepali Congress had a landslide victory, winning all over Nepal including in Subarna Shamsher's constituency Birgunj. In total, it won 74 out 109 seats.

After the results were announced, the then King of Nepal King Mahendra called upon B.P. Koirala to form a government as the Congress had the majority in Parliament. The government was formed in which BP Koirala was prime minister with Subarna Shamsher as deputy prime minister and Finance Minister. During his tenure he spearheaded the development and modernization of Nepal.

== Coup d'état ==
In 1960 King Mahendra organised a coup against the democratically elected government along with the help of the Royal Nepalese Army, which had always kept its loyalties with the king first. Unlike the other leaders of the Nepali Congress who were arrested, Subarna Shamsher was not captured as he was in Calcutta.

All his property in Kathmandu was seized by the government which included the Lalita Niwas estate which was later on turned into the headquarters of the Nepal Rastra Bank. He started armed struggle against Panchayat system. It was of bigger scale than 2007 revolution. It had almost succeeded in compromising Mahendra's position but had to be stopped after China attacked India. B. P. Koirala believed that one of the reasons it failed because of its overdependence on India.

Multiple occasions after the coup, King Mahendra called Subarna Shamsher back to Nepal and promised the position of prime minister and all his property which was seized by the Nepalese Government but as Subarna Shamsher never compromised on his political principles and he always turned the offer down. Till his death in 1977, he continued the struggle of the Nepali Congress from Calcutta.

== See also ==
- History of Nepal

Political offices
| Preceded by Kunwar Indrajit Singh | List of prime ministers of Nepal; 1958 – 1959 | Succeeded by B. P. Koirala |
