= Mohan Shumsher Jung Bahadur Rana =

Prime Minister of Nepal from 1948 to 1951

Field Marshal His Highness Shree Maharaja Sir Mohan Shumsher Jung Bahadur Rana, GCB, GCIE, GBE
- श्री ३ मोहन शमशेर जङ्गबहादुर राणा
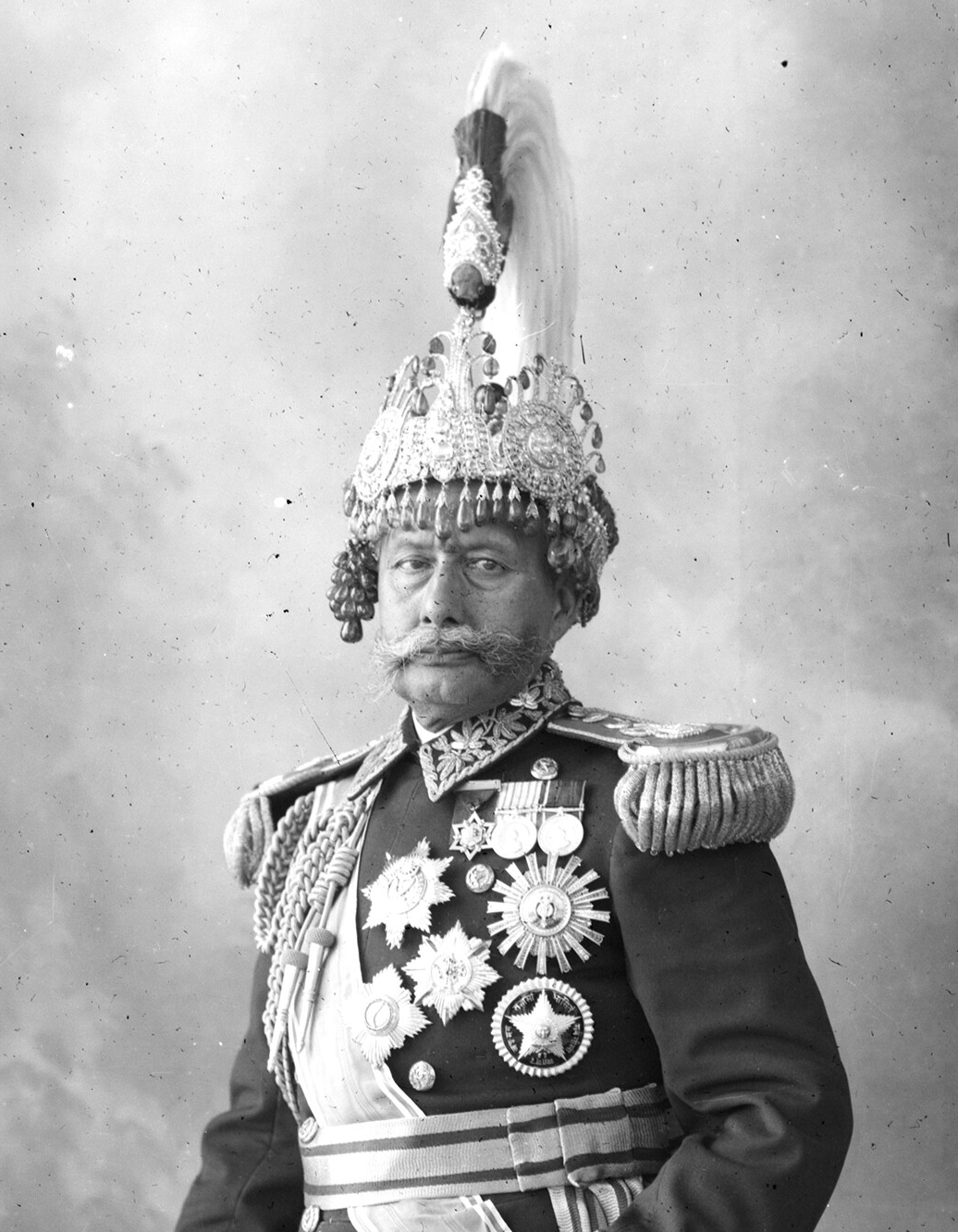
- Portrait of Mohan Shamsher

Prime Minister of Nepal
- In office 30 April 1948 – 12 November 1951
- Monarchs: Tribhuvan; Gyanendra
- Preceded by: Padma Shumsher JBR
- Succeeded by: Matrika Prasad Koirala

Personal details
- Born: 23 December 1885
- Died: 6 January 1967 (aged 81) Bangalore
- Parent(s): Chandra Shumsher Jang Bahadur Rana (father); Chandra Loka Bhakta Lakshmi Devi (mother)
- Occupation: Prime Minister of Nepal

Maharaja of Lamjang and Kaski
- Reign: 27 June 1901 – 26 November 1929
- Predecessor: Padma Shumsher Jung Bahadur Rana
- Successor: Rana rule abolished, see Lamjang-Kaski for titular head
- Spouse: Sri Maharani Dikshya Rajya Laxmi
- Issue: General Sri Maharajkumar Sharada Shumsher Jung Bahadur Rana; General Sri Yuvaraj Bijaya Shumsher Jung Bahadur Rana
- Dynasty: Rana dynasty
- Father: Chandra Shumsher
- Mother: Sri Maharani Chandra Loka Bhakta Devi

Field-Marshal Shree Maharaja Sir Mohan Shumsher Jung Bahadur Rana (Nepali: मोहन शम्शेर जङ्गबहादुर राणा), GCB, GCIE, GBE (23 December 1885 – 6 January 1967) was the prime minister and foreign minister of Nepal from 30 April 1948 until 12 November 1951.

He was the last prime minister from the Rana family, which had controlled Nepal for more than a century and reduced the monarchy to a figurehead. He was the son of the 5th Rana Maharaja of Nepal Chandra Shumsher and Bada Maharani Chandra Loka Bhakta Lakshmi Devi. He became prime minister at a time when the king, Tribhuvan was attempting to assert himself. Tribhuvan wanted to establish a stronger monarchy and some democracy, which Mohan Shumsher opposed.

In 1950, escalating tensions between the Rana government and the monarchy culminated in a palace coup led by Mohan Shumsher. His policies against the Shah monarchy forced King Tribhuvan of Nepal and his son Mahendra of Nepal to flee to India with assistance from the Indian Residency and the Government of India. After their escape, Mohan Shumsher attempted to legitimize the coup by dethroning Tribhuvan and proclaiming Mahendra’s 3-year-old son, Gyanendra of Nepal, as the new king of Nepal.

Later in the revolution of 1951, Tribhuvan returned to Nepal after signing the Delhi Treaty between Mohan Shumsher, Tribhuvan, and Congress thus restoring his throne and bringing the stately power back to the monarch. By the end of 1951, the King and his allies in Congress had triumphed, and Mohan Shumsher and the rest of the Rana family lost power. The Ranas were removed from all the hereditary offices and privileges conferred by King Surendra Bikram Shah on Jung Bahadur even though Mohan Shumsher still held the office of the prime minister, several demonstrations by Rana supporters in an attempt to reestablish their rule and the opposition of the monarchy and Congress forced him to resign from his position.

== Death ==
On 14 December 1951, Mohan Shumsher went into self-imposed exile in India, and died in Bangalore in 1967, aged 81.

== Legacy ==
Despite the family's loss of their grip on the position of Prime Minister, his and his brother's descendants still hold considerable power and wealth in Nepal.

== See also ==
- Mohan SJB Rana cabinet, 1951

Political offices
Preceded by Padma Shumsher Jung Bahadur Rana	Prime Minister of Nepal; 1948–1951	Succeeded by Matrika Prasad Koirala
