= List of Nepalese writers =

This is a list of Nepalese writers.

== Nepali ==
- Abhi Subedi
- Amar Neupane
- Ambika Prasad Upadhyaya
- Arbind Rimal
- Ashesh Malla
- Baburam Acharya
- Bairagi Kainla
- Bal Krishna Pokharel
- Balkrishna Sama
- Banira Giri
- Basanta Basnet
- Bhagi Raj Ingnam
- Bhairav Aryal
- Bhanubhakta Acharya
- Bharat Jangam
- Bharat Koirala
- Bhawani Bhikshu
- Bhuwan Dhungana
- Bhim Nidhi Tiwari
- Bhola Rijal
- Bimala Tumkhewa
- Binod Prasad Dhital
- Bishweshwar Prasad Koirala
- Bhim Bahadur Pande
- Bhupal Rai
- Bhupi Sherchan
- Bijaya Malla
- Buddha Sayami
- Buddhi Narayan Shrestha
- Buddhisagar
- Byakul Maila
- Chabilal Upadhyaya
- Chakrapani Chalise
- Queen Aishwarya of Nepal
- Chandra Prakash Baniya
- Chhinnalata
- Chittaranjan Nepali
- Chuda Mani Regmi
- Daulat Bikram Bista
- Daya Bir Singh Kansakar
- Deepak Shimkhada
- Desh Subba
- Dha. Cha. Gotame
- Dharanidhar Koirala
- Dharmaraj Thapa
- Dharma Ratna Yami
- Dharmendra Bikram Nembang
- Dhooswan Sayami
- Dhruba Chandra Gautam
- Diamond Shumsher Rana
- Durga Lal Shrestha
- Gyandil Das
- Gyanendra of Nepal
- Geeta Tripathee
- Girish Ballabh Joshi
- Gopal Parajuli
- Gopal Prasad Rimal
- Govinda Bahadur Malla
- Guru Prasad Mainali
- Hangyug Agyat
- Hari Bansha Acharya
- Hari Bhakta Katuwal
- Hari Prasad Rimal
- Harka Gurung
- Hemang Dixit
- Hridaya Chandra Singh Pradhan
- Ishwar Ballav
- Jagadish Ghimire
- Jagat Lal Master
- Jiwan Parajuli
- Janak Prasad Humagain
- Jaya Prithvi Bahadur Singh
- Jhamak Ghimire
- Kamal Mani Dixit
- Kanak Mani Dixit
- Karna Shakya
- Karunakar Vaidya
- Kedar Gurung
- Kesar Lall
- Kedar Man Vyathit
- Kedar Nath Neupane
- Khagendra Sangraula
- Khaptad Swami
- Komalnath Adhikari
- Krishnahari Baral
- Krishna Bhusan Bal
- Krishna Chandra Singh Pradhan
- Krishna Dharabasi
- Kshetra Pratap Adhikary
- Kul Bahadur KC
- Kumar Kashyap Mahasthavir
- Kumar Nagarkoti
- Lain Singh Bangdel
- Queen Tripurasundari of Nepal
- Laxmi Prasad Devkota
- Lekhnath Paudyal
- Leeladhwaj Thapa
- Madan Mani Dixit
- Madan Mohan Mishra
- Madhav Prasad Ghimire
- Mahananda Sapkota
- Mahesh Bikram Shah
- Mahesh Chandra Regmi
- Manu Brajaki
- Mahendra of Nepal
- Master Mitrasen Thapa Magar
- Mohan Koirala
- Motiram Bhatta
- Mukunda Sharan Upadhyaya
- Naba Raj Lamsal
- Nara Dev Pandey
- Nara Nath Acharya
- Nar Bahadur Saud
- Narayan Rayamajhi
- Narayan Wagle
- Nawaraj Silwal
- Nayan Raj Pandey
- Neelam Karki Niharika
- Neer Shah
- Nityaraj Pandey
- Parashu Pradhan
- Parijat
- Peter J. Karthak
- Prema Shah
- Prithvi Narayan Shah
- Radha Paudel
- Rajan Mukarung
- Rajesh Gautam
- Rajeshwor Devkota
- Ramesh Bikal
- Ramlal Joshi
- Ram Krishna Bantawa
- Ram Man Trishit
- Ram Raj Pant
- Ramesh Kshitij
- Rashmila Shakya
- Rewati Raman Khanal
- Riddhi Bahadur Malla
- Rookmangud Katawal
- Rudra Raj Pande
- Sanjeev Uprety
- Santosh Lamichhane
- Sanu Sharma
- Saraswati Pratikshya
- Sarita Tiwari
- Saru Bhakta
- Satya Mohan Joshi
- Shakti Ballav Aryal
- Shankar Lamichhane
- Shanta Chaudhary
- Shanti Mishra
- Shanta Das Manandhar
- Sharada Sharma
- Shikhar Ghimirey
- Shiva Kumar Rai
- Shivani Singh Tharu
- Shrawan Mukarung
- Siddhicharan Shrestha
- Somnath Sigdel
- Subin Bhattarai
- Sulochana Manandhar
- Suman Pokhrel
- Surya Bikram Gyawali
- Sushila Karki
- Sushma Joshi
- Swapnil Smriti
- Taranath Sharma
- Tarini Prasad Koirala
- Toya Gurung
- Tulasi Diwasa
- Upendra Subba
- Usha Sherchan
- Uttam Kunwar
- Vishnu Raj Atreya
- Yogbir Singh Kansakar
- Yogesh Raj
- Yogi Naraharinath
- Yogmaya Neupane
- Yubraj Nayaghare
- Yuyutsu Sharma

== Nepalbhasa (Newar) ==
- Aniruddha Mahathera
- Bauddha Rishi Mahapragya
- Bhaskara Malla
- Bhupatindra Malla
- Buddha Sayami
- Buddhaghosa Mahasthavir
- Chittadhar "Hridaya"
- Chittadhar Hridaya
- Daya Bir Singh Kansakar
- Dhammalok Mahasthavir
- Dharma Ratna Yami
- Dharmachari Guruma
- Dharmaditya Dharmacharya
- Dhooswan Sayami
- Durga Lal Shrestha
- Ganesh Lal Shrestha
- Girija Prasad Joshi
- Jagajjyoti Malla
- Jagat Lal Master
- Jagat Sundar Malla
- Jagajjaya Malla
- Jaya Prakash Malla
- Jayaprakash Malla
- Kedar Nath Neupane
- Kesar Lall
- Kumar Kashyap Mahasthavir
- Madan Mohan Mishra
- Mahendra Malla
- Moti Laxmi Upasika
- Nisthananda Bajracharya
- Nripendra Malla
- Parthibendra Malla
- Phatte Bahadur Singh
- Pragyananda Mahasthavir
- Pratap Malla
- Pratek Man Tuladhar
- Prem Bahadur Kansakar
- Purna Kaji Tamrakar
- Pushpa Ratna Sagar
- Rajendra Bikram Shah
- Rana Bahadur Shah
- Ranabir Singh Thapa
- Ranajit Malla
- Rebati Ramanananda Shrestha
- Satya Mohan Joshi
- Shashikala Manandhar
- Siddhicharan Shrestha
- Siddhidas Mahaju
- Siddhi Narasimha Malla
- Srinivasa Malla
- Sudarshan Mahasthavir
- Sukraraj Shastri
- Sulochana Manandhar
- Tara Devi Tuladhar
- Yoga Narendra Malla
- Yogbir Singh Kansakar

== Sanskrit ==
- Bhanubhakta Acharya
- Lekhnath Paudyal
- Motiram Bhatta
- Mukunda Sharan Upadhyaya
- Nara Nath Acharya
- Vishnu Raj Atreya

== Limbu language ==
- Bairagi Kainla
- Phalgunanda

== Maithili ==
- Dhirendra Premarshi

== Hindi ==
- Dhooswan Sayami
- Sitaram Agrahari

== Avadhi ==
- Vishnu Raj Atreya

== Tamang ==
- Bina Theeng Tamang

== English ==
- Abhi Subedi
- C. K. Lal
- D. B. Gurung
- Greta Rana
- Deepak Shimkhada
- Manjushree Thapa
- Prajwal Parajuly
- Pranaya SJB Rana
- Pratyoush Onta
- Rabi Thapa
- Sanjeev Uprety
- Samrat Upadhyay
- Suman Pokhrel
- Yogesh Raj
- Yongey Mingyur Rinpoche
- Yuyutsu Sharma

== Chinese ==
- Sulochana Manandhar

== See also ==
- Nepali literature
- Newar literature
- List of Nepali-language writers
- List of Newar-language writers
- List of Nepalese poets
