= List of Nepali-language writers =

This is a list of writers who have written in the Nepali language irrespective of their nationality.

== A ==
- Abhi Subedi – poet, playwright, essayist
- Agam Singh Giri (1927–1971) – poet, lyricist
- Ali Miya
- Amar Neupane – novelist
- Arbind Rimal
- Asit Rai

== B ==
- Bairagi Kainla – poet
- Bhagi Raj Ingnam – historian
- Bhanubhakta Acharya – poet
- Basanta Basnet – writer, journalist
- Bharat Jangam – novelist
- Bhawani Bhikshu – novelist
- Bhim Nidhi Tiwari – poet
- Balkrishna Sama – playwright, poet
- Bhairav Aryal – satirist, essayist
- Bhupal Rai – poet
- Bhupi Sherchan – poet
- Bhuwan Dhungana – short story writer, poet
- Bimala Tumkhewa – poet
- Buddha Sayami – poet
- Buddhi Sagar – novelist

== C ==
- Chandani Shah – poet, lyricist
- Chandra Prakash Baniya – writer, historian
- Chakrapani Chalise – poet
- Chhinnalata – writer
- Chittaranjan Nepali
- Chuda Mani Regmi

== D ==
- Daya Bir Singh Kansakar
- Deepak Shimkhada
- Desh Subba
- Dharanidhar Koirala – poet
- Dharma Ratna Yami
- Dhruba Chandra Gautam
- Diamond Shumsher Rana – novelist
- Durga Lal Shrestha – lyricist

== G ==
- G. Shah – lyricist
- Ganga Bikram Sijapati
- Ganga Prasad Pradhan
- Geeta Tripathee – poet, lyricist, essayist
- Girish Ballabh Joshi – novelist
- Gopal Parajuli – poet
- Gopal Prasad Rimal – poet
- Guman Singh Chamling – poet, novelist
- Guru Prasad Mainali – poet, playwright

== H ==
- Hari Bansha Acharya – comedian, autobiographer
- Hari Prasad Gorkha Rai – poet
- Hari Prasad Rimal
- Harka Gurung
- Hemang Dixit
- Hari Bhakta Katuwal - Poet, Lyricist

* H.B. Khatri youth writer (poet, novelist, story)

== I ==
- Indra Bahadur Rai – novelist, critic
- Iman Xin Chemjong – linguist, lexicographer, folklorist
- Ishwar Ballav – poet

== J ==
- Jagadish Ghimire – autobiographer
- Jagat Lal Master
- Jhamak Ghimire – autobiographer
- Jyoti Prakash Tamang

== K ==
- Kamal Mani Dixit – essayist
- Kamala Sankrityayan
- Kanak Mani Dixit – journalist, editor
- Karna Shakya
- Karunakar Vaidya
- Kedar Gurung
- Khagendra Sangraula
- Kesar Lall
- Kedar Nath Neupane
- Krishnahari Baral
- Krishna Bhooshan Bal
- Krishna Chandra Singh Pradhan
- Krishna Dharabasi
- Kshetra Pratap Adhikary
- Kul Bahadur KC
- Kumar Kashyap Mahasthavir
- Kumar Nagarkoti
- Kumar Pradhan

== L ==
- Lain Singh Bangdel – painter, novelist
- Lakshmi Prasad Devkota – poet, essayist
- Lekhnath Paudyal – poet
- Lil Bahadur Chettri – novelist
- Leeladhwaj Thapa

== M ==
- Madan Mani Dixit
- Madan Mohan Mishra – poet
- Mahananda Poudyal
- Mahananda Sapkota – poet, linguist
- Mahendra P. Lama
- Mahesh Bikram Shah – short story writer
- Mahesh Chandra Regmi
- M.B.B. Shah – lyricist
- Manjul
- Manu Brajaki - short story writer
- Motiram Bhatta – poet, ghazalist
- Mukunda Sharan Upadhyaya – poet

== N ==
- Nanda Hangkhim – poet
- Nara Nath Acharya
- Nar Bahadur Bhandari
- Nar Bahadur Saud
- Narayan Rayamajhi
- Nar Bahadur Saud
- Narayan Rayamajhi
- Narayan Wagle – journalist, novelist
- Nawaraj Silwal
- Nayan Raj Pandey – novelist
- Neelam Karki Niharika – novelist
- Neer Shah

== P ==
- Pancham Adhikary
- Parashu Pradhan – short story writer
- Parijat – novelist
- Phatte Bahadur Singh
- Prajwal Parajuly
- Prema Shah – short story writer
- Prithvi Narayan Shah – poet
- Pawan Chamling

== R ==
- Radha Paudel – memoir writer
- Rajesh Gautam
- Rajeshwor Devkota – short story writer
- Ramesh Bikal – novelist
- Ramlal Joshi – novelist
- Ram Raj Pant
- Ramesh Kshitij
- Rashmila Shakya
- Rebati Ramanananda Shrestha
- Rudra Raj Pande - educator, novelist

== S ==
- Santosh Lamichhane
- Sanu Sharma - novelist, short story writer, poet, lyricist
- Saru Bhakta – poet, novelist, playwright
- Satya Mohan Joshi – poet, playwright
- Shankar Lamichhane – essayist
- Shanta Chaudhary
- Shikhar Ghimirey
- Shiva Kumar Rai
- Shrawan Mukarung – poet, lyricist
- Siddhicharan Shrestha – poet
- Subhash Ghisingh – novelist
- Subin Bhattarai
- Suman Pokhrel – poet, lyricist, playwright, translator
- Surya Bikram Gyawali – historian
- Sushma Joshi
- Swapnil Smriti – poet

== T ==
- Tara Devi Tuladhar
- Tara Nath Sharma – writer
- Tarini Prasad Koirala – novelist
- Tirtha Gurung - Novelist
- Toya Gurung - poet, academician
- Tulsi Diwasa – poet, folklorist
- Tulsi Ghimire
- Tulsiram Sharma Kashyap

== U ==
- Upendra Subba (born, 1971) – poet, short story writer
- Usha Sherchan (born 1955) – poet and story writer
- Uttam Kunwar – writer, essayist

== V ==
- Vishnu Raj Atreya – poet, writer

== Y ==
- Yogmaya Neupane (1867–1941)
- Yuyutsu Sharma (born 1960)
- Yogbir Singh Kansakar
- Yubraj Nayaghare
