= Nepal Literature Festival =

Annual literary festival in Nepal

Nepal Literature Festival नेपाल साहित्य महोत्सव
- Logo of Nepal Literature Festival
- Status: Active
- Genre: Literary festival
- Date: 2011
- Frequency: Annually
- Venue: Kathmandu, Nepal (2011-2014); Nepal Tourism Board, Pardi, Pokhara(2016-); Janakpur(2019)
- Location: Pokhara
- Country: Nepal
- Years active: 2011-present
- Founder: Bookworm Foundation
- Most recent: 27–30 January 2017
- Previous event: 29 January-1 February 2016
- Organiser: Bookworm Foundation, Random Readers’ Society
- Sponsor: Nepal Telecom, Nepal Tourism Board
- Website: Official website

Nepal Literature Festival (Nepali: नेपाल साहित्य महोत्सव) is an annual international literary festival which takes place in Pokhara, Nepal (previously Kathmandu). It was founded in 2011 by Bookworm Foundation, a not-for-profit organization.

== Timeline ==
=== 2011 ===
The first edition of the festival was held from 18 to 21 August in Gyan Mandala in Jhamsikhel, Lalitpur. The festival was sponsored by Ncell, a telecommunication company.

=== 2012 ===
The second edition of festival was held from 20 to 23 September on the premises of the Nepal Academy at Kamaladi, Kathmandu The festival was sponsored by Ncell. The festival was attended by international writers: Mark Tully, Indra Bahadur Rai and Ira Trivedi.

=== 2013 ===
The third edition of festival was held from 25 to 28 October in the premises of the Nepal Academy at Kamaladi, Kathmandu. The festival was sponsored by Ncell, a telecommunication company. The festival was attended by international writers: Shobhaa De, Ravinder Singh, Prajwal Parajuly and Farah Ghuznavi.

=== 2014 ===
The fourth edition of festival was held from 19 to 22 September in the premises of the Nepal Academy at Kamaladi, Kathmandu. The festival was sponsored by Ncell, a telecommunication company. The festival was attended by international writers: Shashi Tharoor, Farah Ghuznavi, Tishani Doshi, Carlo Pizzati, Basharat Peer, and Hartosh Singh Bal.

=== 2016 ===
The fifth edition of festival was held from 29 January-1 February 2016 in premises of Nepal Tourism Board, Pardi, Pokhara. The festival was inaugurated by a retired British Gurkha officer. The festival had writers like Barkha Dutt, Ira Trivedi, Shobhaa De, Farah Ghuznavi, Ned Beauman, Vinod Mehta and Uday Prakash.

=== 2017 ===
The sixth edition of festival was held from 29 January-1 February 2017 in premises of Nepal Tourism Board, Pardi, Pokhara . The festival was attended by authors, artists, politicians, media persons, intellectuals, economists, sociologists and attendees. The festival had Indian writer Ramachandra Guha, novelist Durjoy Datta and poet Uday Prakash.

- Full list of festival participants:

Aahuti, Aditya Adhikari, Amar Neupane, Amit Dhakal, Amrit Gurung, Amrit Subedi, Bairagi Kainla, Basanta Basnet, Basanta Thapa, Bhupal Rai, Bhupin, Bibek Shrestha (Kandara), Bimal Acharya, Binod Baniya, Birendra Bahadur Basnet, Bishwa Paudel, Buddhisagar, Chaitanya Mishra, Chandra Kishore, C.K. Lal, Devendra Bhattarai, Dhruba Chandra Gautam, Dipendra Shrestha, Durjoy Datta, Gagan Thapa, Ganess Paudel, Ghanashyam Bhusal, Gunaraj Luitel, Hari Bahadur Gandharba, Hari Bahadur Thapa, Hari Sharma, Harihar Birahi, Hari Bansha Acharya, Hima Bista, Ishwor Mani Adhikari, Jiba Lamichhane, Jiwan Kshetri, Kalpana Chiluwal, Kanak Mani Dixit, Kapil Sharma, Kedar Sharma, Kedar Bhakta Mathema, Khagendra Sangraula, Kiran Nepal, Kripa Joshi (Miss Moti), Kulman Ghising, Kumar Nagarkoti, Kusumakar Neupane, Laxmi Sharma, Lochan Rijal, Madan Krishna Shrestha, Mahesh Bikram Shah, Narayan Dhakal, Namgay Zam, Narayan Gandharba, Narayan Wagle, Nayanraj Pandey, Nabaraj Parajuli, Neeva Shah, Omprakash Aryal, Prabha Bhattarai, Pranika Koyu, Pushkar Shah, Rabindra Adhikari, Rabindra Samir, Rajan Mukarung, Rajendra Dahal, Rajendra Parajuli, Rambhakta Jojiju, Ramchandra Guha, Raamesh Koirala, Ramlal Joshi, Richa Bhattarai, Sabitri Gautam, Samriddhi Rai, Saraswoti Pratikshya, Saraswati Shrestha Saru, Sarita Tiwari, Shakuntla Joshi, Shiva Gaule, Shivani Singh Tharu, Shubha Kayastha, Subin Bhattarai, Sudheer Sharma, Sujit Mahat, Swarnim Wagle, Tirtha Shrestha, Upendra Paudel, Uday Prakash, Yangesh.

=== 2018 ===
The seventh edition of the festival was held on the banks of the Fewa Lake opposite the Ratna Mandir in Pokhara, from December 22 to December 25, 2018. The then Honorable Minister for Culture, Tourism and Civil Aviation Rabindra Adhikari was the Chief Guest of the event. Pakistani writer Mohammed Hanif, British illustrator and graphic artist Nicola Streeten, Nepali-Indian author Prajwal Parajuly, Indian writer Namita Gokhale, and Nepali-Canadian writer Manjushree Thapa were some of the panelist at the festival. The festival also had a performance by famous Nepali singer Dharmender Sewan.

=== 2019 ===
The eighth edition of the festival was held on two locations. It was held in Janakpur, Nepal on November 8 to November 10 and in Pokhara from December 13 to December 16(Nepali: मंसिर २७ देखि ३० गते).

Former President of Nepal, Dr. Ram Baran Yadav chaired the Janakpur edition of the festival. The first day of the festival was celebrated with Maithili songs and performance and speech by Dr. Yadav, author and critic Hari Sharma, journalist Anil Mishra and Province 2 coordinator of Visit Nepal Year 2020, Manish Jha. On the second day, discussions were held on topics ranging from Chure range to food culture of Madhesh and literature related to Tarai-Hill political dynamic. A session titled ‘Madhesh ko Bhojan’ (the food cultureof Madesh) was held with Gayatri Sharma, Imtiaz Wafa, Kedar Sharma and Gani Ansari in a discussion.

The Pokhara edition of the festival was inaugurated by Chief Minister of Gandaki State, Prithivi Subba Gurung.

The DSC Prize for South Asian Literature, 2019 was awarded to Indian writer Amitabh Bagchi for his novel 'Half the Night is Gone' in the presence of the shortlisted authors and the jury panel by Chief Guest Ishwar Pokhrel, former Deputy Prime Minister and Minister of Defence of Nepal during the festival in Pokhara.

=== 2020 ===
The ninth edition of the festival was held from 28 December to 30 December 2020. Due to COVID-19 pandemic, some of the panels were held virtually while some were held in isolated location in Sarangkot, Pokhara and streamed digitally on YouTube.

List of panelist of the festival

Bina Theeng Tamang, Ramesh Bhusal, Chandra Prakash Dhakal, Shilshila Acharya, Rajkumar Baniya, Dr. Rolina Dhital, Roshan Mishra, Nischal Basnet, Biswo Poudel, Ayushi KC, Priyanka Karki, Rabindra Puri, Sobita Gautam, Swechha Raut, Hari Khanal, Bikesh Kabin, Chandra Prakash Baniya, Durga Karki, Avasna Pandey, Keshab Dahal, Kuber Chalise, Bhaskar Dhungana, Aranico Pandey, Alok Tuladhar, Manushree Mahat, Prithvi Subba Gurung, Kiran Gurung, Manju Devi Gurung, Sita Sundas, Pradip Rodan, Amrit Subedi, Saugat Wagle, Bhavana Tamang, Jagannath Lamichhane, Illya Bhattarai, Yangesh, Bonita Sharma, Deepak Pariyar, Sonika Manandhar, Basanta Basnet, Dr. Anup Subedi, Milan Bagale, Shivani Singh Tharu, Prakriti Bhattarai Basnet, Niranjan Kunwar, Bhikku Kashyap

2022

The 10th edition of Nepal Literature Festival was held in Pokhara from 21 to 26 December 2022. There were 55 diverse sessions over 5 days. The event was a combination of literature, culture, poetry, and music as well as discussions on different topics. This included sports to food, nature to politics, literary translation to creative writing and many more.
