= List of Newar-language writers =

The list is not comprehensive, but is continuously being expanded and includes Newar writers, poets and playwriters who write in the Newar language.

== 14th century ==
- Manikya

== 16th century ==
- Mahendra Malla

== 17th century ==
- Siddhi Narasimha Malla
- Jagajjyoti Malla
- Srinivasa Malla
- Pratap Malla
- Jagat Prakasha Malla
- Jitamitra Malla
- Nripendra Malla
- Parthibendra Malla
- Bhupalendra Malla

== 18th century ==
- Bhupatindra Malla
- Bhaskara Malla
- Jagajjaya Malla
- Jayaprakash Malla
- Ranajit Malla
- Briddhi Lakshmi
- Yoga Narendra Malla
- Vishnu Malla
- Rajya Prakash Malla
- Rana Bahadur Shah

== 19th century ==
- Rajendra Bikram Shah
- Ranabir Singh Thapa

== 20th century ==
- Sukraraj Shastri
- Siddhidas Mahaju
- Chittadhar "Hridaya"
- Siddhicharan Shrestha
- Madan Mohan Mishra
- Girija Prasad Joshi
- Dharma Ratna Yami
- Dhooswan Sayami
- Durga Lal Shrestha
- Rebati Ramanananda Shrestha
