= Sanjeev Uprety =

Nepali writer, academic and activist

- सञ्जीव उप्रेती
- Education: Brown University (PhD); State University of New York at Binghamton (MA)
- Occupations: Writer, academic, activist
- Employer: Tribhuvan University

Sanjeev Uprety is a Nepali writer, academic, and social activist. He is a former professor of English at Tribhuvan University. His work spans Nepali literature, cultural criticism, and gender studies, and has been discussed in Nepali media and literary circles.

== Early life and education ==
Uprety completed his Ph.D. in English literature from Brown University in 2003 and earned his M.A. in English from the State University of New York at Binghamton.

He later conducted postdoctoral research at Harvard University and the University of California, Berkeley.

== Academic career ==
Uprety taught at the Central Department of English, Tribhuvan University, where he worked for over two decades.

His academic work focuses on postcolonial theory, masculinity studies, and cultural criticism.

== Literary career ==
Uprety's works combine satire, philosophical reflection, and socio-political critique.

=== Major works ===
- Ghanchakkar (Akshar Creations, ISBN 978-9937-8558-1-5)
- Siddhanta Ka Kura (Book Hill Publications, ISBN 978-9937-941488)
- Hansa (Book Hill Publications, ISBN 978-9937-934244)
- Makai ko Arkai Kheti (ISBN 978-9937-8481-8-3)
- A Different Cultivation of Maize (ISBN 978-9937-8481-6-9)

== Research and public engagement ==
Uprety’s work on masculinity and social structure has been discussed in Nepali media.

He has written on social structure, rituals, and gender in Nepal.

== Activism ==
Uprety has been involved in Nepal’s civil society movements, including the Brihat Nagarik Andolan.

In 2020, he received national media attention after declining to share the Padmashree Literary Award stage.

This decision received coverage in multiple national media outlets and was discussed in relation to ethics and cultural recognition in Nepal.
