= Ram Krishna Bantawa =

Nepali writer and lyricist

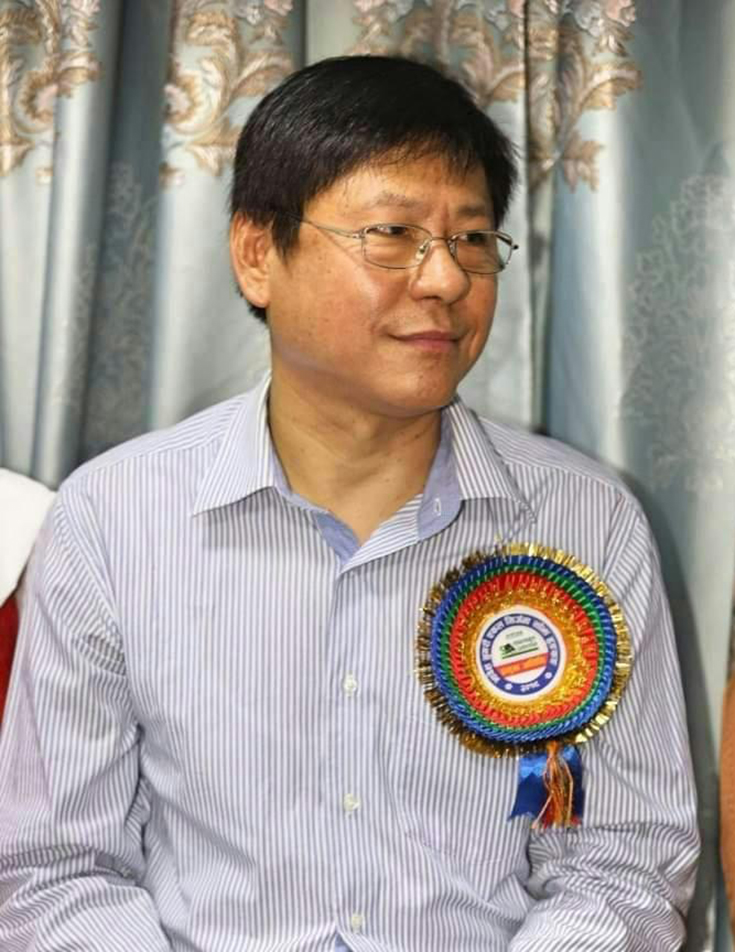
- Ram Krishna Bantawa
- Born: 1 January 1967 (age 59)
- Occupations: Author, lyricist
- Spouse: Deep Bantawa
- Children: 1
- Writing career
- Notable work: Shrill Mist [Saghan Tuwanlo] Aamalai Chitthi

Ram Krishna Bantawa (Nepali: रामकृष्ण वान्तवा) is a Nepalese author, writer and lyricist. He is best known for his novel Saghan Tuwanlo (Nepali: साघन तुवाँलो) (which was translated to English as Shrill Mist), and Aamalai Chitthi.

Bantawa is a diasporic novelist, he has spent the majority of his life in Hong Kong. Most of his books were written while he was outside the country, reflecting a blend of his experiences in Hong Kong while maintaining a deep connection to Nepali culture, traditions, and society. He was also invited as Chief Guest under the organization of Charu Sahitya Pratishthan, a book launch and Teej special program among authors from Kathmandu, Bhaktapur, Lalitpur held at Kavya Hall of Hotel Hardik

== Early life ==
Ram Krishna Bantawa was born on 1 January 1967 (Nepali: बि.सं. १७ पुष २०२३) as the youngest son to father Pancham Bantawa and mother BhadraSara Bantawa in Khotang District Nepal.

== Works ==
Saghan Tuwanlo (Nepali: साघन तुवाँलो) is Bantawa's famous Novel published in 2008. His novel focuses on the courage, love and injustice of two women's. The novel spans the period from Nepal's first constitution in 1846 to the murder of King Birendra in 2001. His Novel has been translated to English by Nara Devi Rai as "Shrill Mist".

Bantawa's first novel Kharani (Nepali: खरानी) was published in 1988. Atma (Nepali: आत्मा) followed in 1996, Radha Ram (Nepali: राधा राम) in 1997 and Ama Chhori (Nepali: आमाछोरी) in 1998.

Bhag Ek (Part 1), a book of modern songs, appeared in 1995, followed by Bhag Dui (Part 2) in 1998. His first album, Dhuwa (Nepali: धुवा), was produced in 1998.

Bantawa's drama Ashiskshya ko pratiphal (Nepali: अशिक्ष्या को प्रतिफल) was published in 1995.

In 1999 his short epic, Mayajaal (Nepali: मायाजाल) a poetry collection was published.

In 2005, Bantawa's folk, contemporary and pop album Aavaa (Nepali: आभा), sung solo by the Nepali singer Abha Mukarung, brought stardom to the singer in Nepal among which Kata Hideko was famous.

Aawaz, an album dedicated to peace, featured Bantawa's lyrics with music composed by Nagendra Shrestha and sung by Bikal Pardhan and Abha Mukarung. Aawaz album included songs like " Kunai Phool jasto Lagyo", "Aawaj Sanga" etc.

In 2019 Bantawa's Novel Aamalai Chitthi (Nepali: आमालाई चिठी) was published. His Novel is being translated to English by Dr. Devi Panthi .

In 2020 During COVID-19 pandemic, Bantawa's Nepali song sung by Nepali singer composer CL Sharma along with Mahesh Silpakar and Suresh Chand was dedicated to all people to fight against the virus.

In 2023 Bantawa's Nepali Song 'Hamro Maya', a song dedicated to all the lover's to love their loved one's unconditionally with no boundaries, featured Bantawa's Lyrics composed by Singer-Composer CL Sharma and sung by Mahesh Silpakar and Melina Rai.
