= Farah Ghuznavi =

Bangladeshi journalist

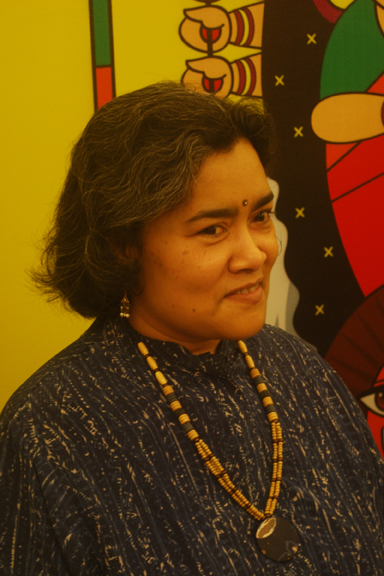
- Farah Ghuznavi
- Born: Quatrina Farah Ghuznavi
- Citizenship: Bangladesh
- Education: London School of Economics; Holy Cross School, Dhaka
- Occupations: Writer, development worker, journalist and translator
- Writing career
- Language: English, Bangla
- Notable awards: Commonwealth Short Stories Competition 2010; Oxford University GEF Short Story Competition 2011, Writer in Residence with Commonwealth Writers 2013
- Website: farahghuznavi.com

Farah Ghuznavi is a Bangladeshi writer, development worker, journalist and translator.

She studied at the London School of Economics. Ghuznavi has worked for the Grameen Bank, the United Nations Development Programme, Christian Aid UK and other non-governmental organizations. She is a regular contributor to The Star weekend magazine.

Her story "Judgement Day" was highly commended at the 2010 Commonwealth Short Story Competition. Her story "Getting There" placed second in the short story competition of the Oxford Gender Equality Festival. Her stories have appeared in a number of anthologies and literary magazines published in the United States, the United Kingdom, Singapore and Bangladesh. She was editor for the Lifelines anthology published in India. A collection of her stories Fragments of Riversong was published in 2013.

Ghuznavi writes her stories in English.
