= Asit Rai =

Nepalese writer

- Born: Darjeeling, West Bengal
- Occupation: Writer
- Citizenship: Indian

Asit Rai (Nepali: असीत राई) is a writer and novelist in the Nepali language from Darjeeling district, India. He received the Sahitya Akademi Award in 1981 for his novel Naya Kshitij Ko Khoj.
