= Dhirendra Premarshi =

Nepali author, songwriter and cultural expert

- धीरेन्द्र प्रेमर्षि
- Born: Bastipur, Siraha district
- Occupations: Songwriter, journalist, cultural expert
- Spouse: Rupa Jha
- Children: 2

Dhirendra Premarshi is a Nepalese songwriter, journalist, and cultural expert who mostly works on Maithili language and culture. He was awarded the Atal Mithila Samman 2019 in New Delhi, India, by Indian Defence Minister Rajnath Singh, in recognition of his contributions to Maithili literature, music and media for decades.
