= Parashu Pradhan =

Nepalese writer (1944–2024)

- परशु प्रधान
- Born: Prashuram Shrestha; 12 February 1944; Bhojpur, Nepal
- Died: 18 March 2024 (aged 80); Baneshwor, Kathmandu, Nepal
- Other names: PR Pradhan
- Education: MA (Nepali and Political Science)
- Occupations: Writer, Civil service
- Spouse: Kalpana Pradhan
- Parents: Ram Bahadur Pradhan (father); Indira Pradhan (mother)
- Awards: Uttam Shanti Puraskar; Ratnashree Swarna Padak

Parashu Pradhan (Nepali: परशु प्रधान; 12 February 1944 – 18 March 2024) was a Nepalese short story writer. He published multiple books and short stories.

== Early life and education ==
Parashu Pradhan was born on 12 February 1944 (Magh 30, 2000 BS) in Bhojpur district, Nepal to father Ram Bahadur Pradhan and mother Indira Pradhan. He passed his SLC-level education in 2014 BS (1958) from Bhojpur Vidyodaya School and completed his Bachelor's degree through private education. He received an MA degree in Nepali and Political Science.

== Death ==
Pradhan died on 18 March 2024, at the age of 80.

== Bibliography ==
Pradhan published over a dozen books, including: Uttarardha (The Latter Half). His stories include: Dalle Khola (The Dalle River), Tokiyoma Sano Buddha (The Little Buddha in Tokyo), Uttarardha (The Latter Half), Chesta, Chesta, Chesta (Attempts!!!), Ma Tero Logne Hu Nirmala (I am Your Husband, Nirmala), Tebal Mathiko Aakasbani (The Telegram on the Table).

== See also ==
- Bairagi Kainla
- Ramesh Bikal
