= Shikhar Ghimirey =

Nepalese writer

- सन्दिप घिमिरे
- Born: Lamjung District
- Occupation: Writer-Fiction
- Writing career
- Language: Nepali
- Subjects: Politics, Literature
- Notable work: Awataar
- Website: shikharghimirey.com

Shikhar Ghimirey (Nepali: शिखर घिमिरे) is a Nepali writer. He was born in Lamjung, a western district of Nepal. His first novel Awataar was released in 2017.

== Published works ==
- Awataar (novel)
