= Hemang Dixit =

Nepalese writer

Hemang Dixit (born 11 June 1937) is a Nepalese educator, author, and consultant paediatrician. He uses the pseudonyms Mani Acharya and Mani Dixit for his written works. He worked as the Dean and Professor of Children's Health of the Tribhuvan University Institute of Medicine. He has written various medical textbooks, novels, children's books and poems.

Dixit's novel Shatru of Kathmandu was published in October 2011. Though a work of fiction, the author used the experience of his attempted murder by extortionists as a starting point for the story.

== Professional career ==
Dixit graduated in Medicine from Charing Cross Hospital Medical School, London University. He has worked at Bir Hospital and Kanti Children's Hospital.

He is a member of the Nepal Medical Council and has served two terms as the council's vice-chair. He is also a member of the Nepal Medical Association, Nepal Paediatric Society, Nepal Leprosy Relief Association, and Nepal Red Cross. He was the vice president (1970–71 & 1974–75) and president (1991–92) of the Nepal Medical Association. He has been the vice president (1984–85) and president (1986–87) of the Nepal Paediatric Society.

He is also a member of the Literary Association Nepal (LAN).

== Publications ==
All of Dixit's works, aside from his technical writings, were released under the pseudonym Mani Dixit.

=== Technical books ===
- Nepal's Quest for Health, 3rd Edition, Educational Publishing House, ISBN 99946-641-7-4
- 50 Years of NMA
- My 2 Innings (Memoirs), 2nd Edition, Makalu Publication House
- A Concise History of Medicine, Makalu Publication House

=== Novels ===
- Shatru of Kathmandu, Educational Publishing House.
- The Red Temple, 2nd Revised Edition Pilgrims Book House
- Come Tomorrow, 2nd Edition Adarsh Books, India
- Over the mountains, Ekta Books
- Conflict in the Himalayas, Ekta Books

=== Children's books ===
- The Adventure of Chandra and Damaru-Two Boys of Nepal, 2nd Revised Edition, Pilgrims Book
- House Friends Colony, 2nd Editions, Rupa & Co., India
- Happenings in Shangri-La, 2nd Edition, Millennium Publication

=== Poetry ===
- The Avenging Ghost, ISBN 99933-50-43-5
- Nonsense Verses from Nepal, Adarsh Books, India

=== Other ===
- Reflections Down the Ages (2019), as Hemang Mani Dixit
