= Karna Shakya =

Nepalese environmentalist

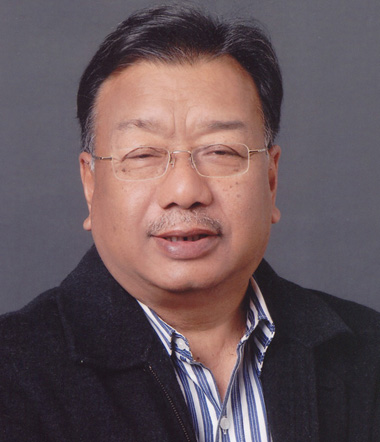
- Born: April 2, 1943 (age 83)
- Citizenship: Nepali
- Education: B.Sc, AIFC
- Alma mater: Indian Forestry Institute, Dehradun, India
- Occupation: Hotel entrepreneur
- Organization(s): KGH Group of Hotels, Resorts & spa
- Known for: Entrepreneur, writer, social worker, conservationist
- Spouse: Sushila Sakya
- Children: Sunil Sakya, Susan Sakya Bajracharya, Rajan Sakya, Trishagni Sakya
- Parent(s): Siddhi Bahadur Sakya, Buddha Maya Sakya
- Relatives: Amritanjali Sakya, Maya Devi Sakya, Bishesh Bajracharya, Jayasth Sakya, Suhana Sakya

Karna Shakya (Nepali: कर्ण शाक्य) (born in April 2, 1943) is a Nepalese environmentalist, conservationist, hotel entrepreneur, writer and philanthropist. Shakya is a forester by academic qualification. He served as a wildlife officer and pioneered in establishing the first National Park in Nepal. He resigned from his government job, entered the tourism business in 1970, and now owns a chain of eco-friendly hotels in major touristic cities like Kathmandu, Pokhara, chitwan and Lumbini.

In 1998, the old neoclassical garden in Keshar Mahal was to be demolished for the construction of a commercial center. However, on the advice of Karna Shakya, Minister of Education Arjun Narasingha KC stopped the demolition work at once and declared it open to the public with a new name, Garden of Dreams.

== Early life and education ==
Karna Shakya was born April 2, 1941 in Kathmandu, Nepal.

Shakya holds AIFC postgraduate in Forestry from the Indian Forest College, Dehradun, India in 1967. He received special conservation training in forest administration in Canberra Australia under the Colombo Plan and Nature Recreation Management course in different National Parks in America under the Department of Interior, Canada and USA.

== Conservation ==
Shakya served as a wildlife conservation officer in Nepal. While working in the department of forest, he traveled to remote areas such as Dolpa, Mustang, Manang, Jomsom, Humla and Jumla in the Northern regions of Nepal. He studied the pygmy hog, the smallest wild boar, in the jungle of Assam and Sundar Kundar forest in East Nepal. Based on his travels and research, he wrote two books, Dolpo and Look Down Not Up. He collected many folktales during his travel and published a book named Tales of Kathmandu with Dr. Linda Griffith. In 1970, after he resigned from forestry, he entered the tourism business. In 1982, he submitted a proposal for the Annapurna Conservation Area. He was instrumental in bringing conservation awareness in the country by establishing Nepal nature conservation society, the first conservation oriented NGO in Nepal.

He has attended many international workshops, colloquiums, and conferences and presented papers and speeches on heritage conservation.

== Tourism ==
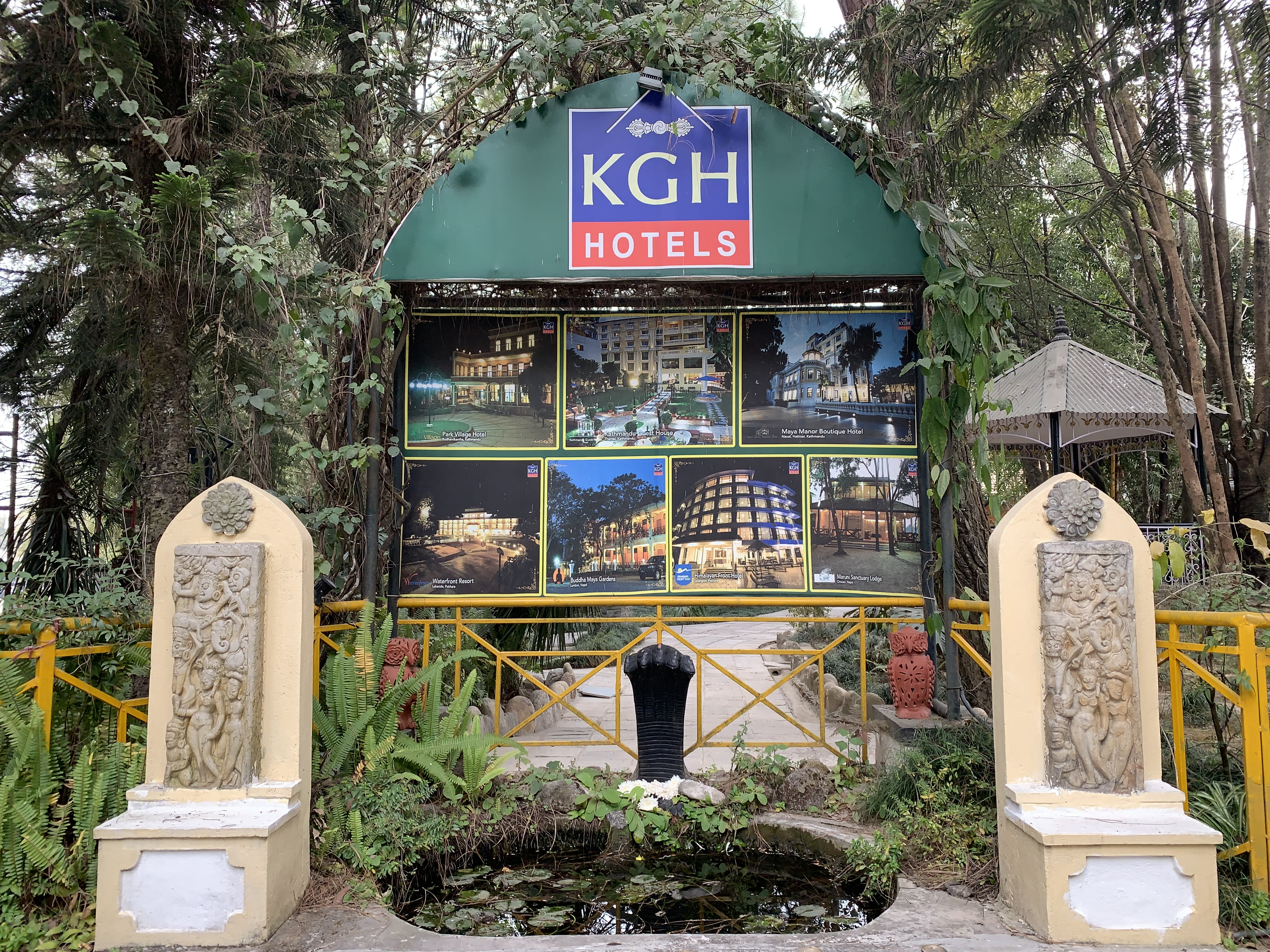
An advertisement board of hotels in KGH Group

Park Village Resort in Budhanilkantha

After he resigned from the Forestry Department, helped his brother Basanta Bahadur Sakya open a 13-room Kathmandu Guest House in Thamel, which was very successful. Now he runs a chain of environment friendly hotels and resorts in different parts of Nepal. He has been credited as a pioneer who opened Thamel as a world tourist destination. Many renowned writers, actors, musicians, researchers and artists come and stay there. His company KGH Group operates Kathmandu Guest House in Thamel, Park Village in Budhanilkhantha, Maya Manor Boutique Hotel in Hattisar Waterfront Resort in Pokhara Himalayan Front Hotel in Pokhara Maruni Sanctuary Lodge in Chitwan Buddha Maya Gardens in Lumbini

Shakya is known as a father of tourism in Nepal. In 1998, he started the first ever tourism project "Visit Nepal Year 1998" which helped to bring awareness about the country. This was followed by Sports Himalaya Year 2000.

== Social work ==
In 1987, Shakya lost his wife and daughter from cancer. At the time, there were no cancer treatment facilities in Nepal and if someone got cancer they had to go abroad for treatment. After he went through a very painful ordeal, he single-handedly started a national campaign to bring awareness on cancer prevention. He was instrumental in establishing the first cancer hospital in Bharatpur, Nepal. He mobilized public opinion so that a national tax on cigarettes, of one paise, was raised to pay for it. He was President of the Nepal Cancer Relief Society and served as an adviser on its board of directors. He was member of B.P. Koirala Memorial Cancer Hospital.. In 2020, his social trust, Karna Positive Trust, partnered with Plus Leader and founders, namely Kim Baaden and Kovid Panthy to provide positive leadership training to Nepalese youths. He was also awarded an Honorary Membership by the Rotary Club of Rajdhani.

== Writer ==
As an environmentalist, he has written four books in English. In 2000, when the Maoist movement was escalating, many entrepreneurs and businessmen left the country and migrated abroad due to anxiety and skepticism, but Shakya decided to live in Nepal and invest in tourism. When the political situation deteriorated, he was caught in a dilemma, whether to continue his hotel business or close it. Contrarily, despite adverse situations, he built three more hotels. During that period, he wrote his first book, Soch (A Thought). After Soch, he wrote a series of books namely, Khoj (Search), Ma Sakchu (I Can Do), and Moj (Pleasure and Satisfaction).

Shakya is a role model among some Nepalese youths. Through his books, he inspired many migrant youths to return to Nepal and start their own enterprises. He also wrote the screenplay for a Nepali feature film Pal (Moments of Life, 2011), which he also produced. Pal tells the story in two different perspectives before and after interval. It won the Chalchitra Bikash Parishad award in 2012. Based on global warming and climate change, he wrote a script for a futuristic movie in August 2009, New York Water City (NYWC).

== Career History ==
Shakya is a founding chairman of KGH Group of Hotels. He worked as a president - Nepal Heritage Society, 1992 and Nepal Cancer Relief Society, 1996; Vice-Chairman, World Pheasant Association, U.K., 1998; Trustee, King Mahendra Trust for Nature Conservation (KMTNC), 1998 Adviser, International Snow Leopard Trust, U.S.A., 1999, World Wildlife Fund (WWF), Nepal, 2006; National Coordinator, Visit Nepal 1998; Member, Prime Minister's Economic Advisory Committee, 2012, Wildlife Officer, HMG Nepal, 1967

== Publications ==
- 1977 Dolpo - The World Behind Himalaya (English), Sarada Prakshan
- 1979 Tales of Kathmandu (English), Jorganesh Publication
- 1983 Look Down Not Up - Encounter Wildlife in Nepal (English), Sahayogi Prakshan
- 2006 Soch (Nepali), Nepal Nature Publication
- 2008 Khoj (Nepali), Nepal Nature Publication
- 2008 Unsung Heroes (Nepali)
- 2008 Kartabyabodh Aviyan (Nepali)
- 2009 Soch Audio Book (Nepali)
- 2009 Paradise on My Backyard (English), Penguin Publication
- 2010 Ma Saxchuu (Nepali), Buddha Maya Publication
- 2010 Khoj Audio Book (Nepali)
- 2011 Pal script and movie, film script
- 2012 Moj (Nepali), Buddha Maya Publication
- 2014 All the Best (English)
- 2017 Kosh (Nepali) Fine Prints
- 2024 Maa Ba (Nepali), Panini Publication

== Selected honors and awards ==
- 2006 Paryatan Dharohar
- 1998 Suprabal Gorkha Dakshin Bahu, by HM King Birendra
- 1988 Prakhat Trishakti Patta, by MH King Birendra
- 1982 Prabal Gorkha Dakshin Bahu, by His Majesty King Birendra
