= C. K. Lal =

Nepalese journalist and writer

- सीके लाल
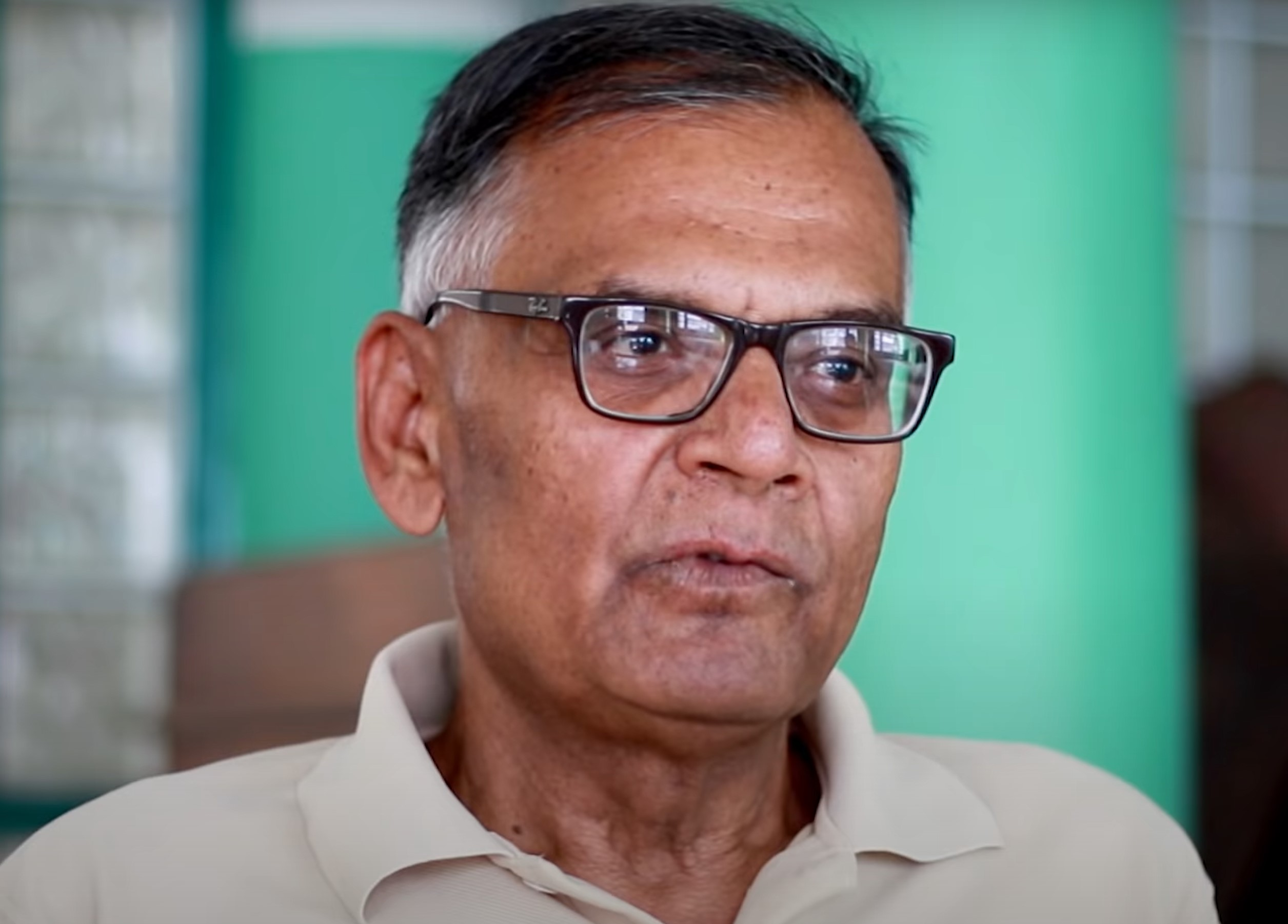
- Lal being interviewed by Onlinekhabar (2019)
- Born: Chandra Kishor Lal; 1956 (age 69–70); Suga Bhawani, Mahottari, Nepal
- Education: Masters
- Alma mater: Tribhuvan University
- Occupations: Journalist, writer

Chandra Kishor Lal, popularly known as C. K. Lal (Nepali: सीके लाल, born 1956) is a Nepalese journalist, political columnist, and engineer. He is mostly known for his columns in daily newspapers in Nepal and India, his frequent participation in academic circles, and his 2010 play Sapanako Sabiti, which premiered in Gurukul. His book Human Rights, Democracy and Governance was published in early 2010 by Pearson, New Delhi. He is also known for his book To Be A Nepalese, published in 2012 by Martin Chautari, Kathmandu. The book was originally published as Nepaliya Hunalai. He is also co-editor of the volume Chapama Dalit published by Ekta Books, Kathmandu (2001).

Office of Public Affairs and Communication at Yale University gives the biography of Lal as follows:

Born in a small village in the southern plains of Nepal, CK Lal studied civil engineering, public administration, law and urban planning in his own country and in India. As a columnist, he has written for Nepali and South Asian magazines and newspapers for over two decades, and is a widely published commentator across media outlets in South Asia. His latest book is To Be a Nepalese. In addition to Nepali, CK Lal reads, speaks and writes in Maithili, Hindi and English. He is also a cultural critic and highly regarded playwright.

Lal has written weekly columns in The Nepali Times (where he wrote for "State Of The State", and later "Fourth Estate", beginning in 2000, the year of its inception, to 2010), as well as for his columns in daily newspapers Republica and Nagarik. He also wrote for Himal South Asian, a monthly magazine about the Southasian affairs.

Lal is widely cited and discussed in the Nepali academia for his insight on the politics, history, geography and culture in both domestic as well as international affairs. He has been writing regularly since the 1990s and is considered one of the most prolific writers in Nepal.

== Themes and Style ==
Most of Lal's writings center upon the contemporary and historical political scenario of Nepal and South Asia. However, he brings insights from a range of disciplines crucial to explaining such issues. Reluctant to be tethered in any narrow set of themes, he has written on politics, diplomacy, economy, media, and gender relating to Nepali or Southasian societies. He usually provides historical frameworks to analyze the unfolding dynamics in a society and hints that politics is not merely straitjacketed dry affair but rather the amalgam of historical forces, including power relations, economic and cultural landscape of the society, ethnicity and races, languages, and hierarchy of wealth distribution. He is known for being critical of the traditional notion of Nepali identity that he argues prioritizes cultural uniformity, treatment of the marginalized section of Nepali like Madhesis and Janajatis as outsiders or lesser Nepalis, and economic hegemony of the small section that is mostly composed of Hill elites. One of the recurrent themes in his essays is that the notion of Nepali has to be more inclusive based on acceptance of differences in cultural ethos, social mores, languages and hosts of socio-cultural identities rather than assimilation and coercion. He believes that "plural politics seeks to address the quest of dignity in a country through the politics of diversity," which includes but is not confined to "institutionalization of jus soli citizenship, proportionate inclusion, representation based on population, federal structure and autonomous units of local government."

Other frequent themes of his essays are how politics should be prioritized first to achieve economically thriving and equitable societies. He thinks that the big political picture should be contextualized and prioritized by politicians, media, and the intelligentsia.

In his essay in Republica titled "National Insecurity States," he explores diverse issues about Bengaluru, often called Bangalore. As a striking remark regarding the official name of the city, he writes: "The paradox is striking—more modern the city, the more traditional sounding name it wants for itself."

== Notable works ==
=== 2000 ===
His first column in the Demo Issue (Issue #00, July 2000) of Nepali Times, a weekly newspaper in Nepal, in which he wrote for ten years, was titled "Elusive Peace." In it, he writes: "Keeping the peace is expensive business. In a country where half the people live below the official poverty line, Rs. 6 billion will be used this fiscal year to police the population." The article argues critical remarks on then most pressing issue of containing Maoists' mayhem that the onus of keeping peace is upon then Prime Minister Girija Prasad Koirala. At that time, Maoists were already waging an insurgency and growing as a political force.

=== 2001 ===
In Nepali Times essay titled Letter from Lille, he narrates his visit to France about his conception of common ways to address the suffering and grievances through discourses and "ideas that transcend time and space." Regarding religions and social harmony, he mentions: "The need to reform religions is no less pressing. After all, religion is politics with cold deities or dead prophets as leaders. It might be desirable to simply abolish religion, but that, too, is unlikely to happen anytime soon. So the only option for us is to have platform for inter-faith dialogues, and inter-religious parliaments where criticism is not considered heresy."

=== 2010 ===
In an essay titled "Wall of words" published in Himal Southasian's December 2010 issue, he broaches pertinent issues on the freedom of speech in India, taking into account the prominent controversy that flared up when Arundhati Roy, an activist from India, decided to speak up her conscience. He writes:

There is little to complain about in the observation that Roy made. With the people wanting azaadi, and living in an almost permanent state of siege by the Indian security forces, Kashmir has indeed never been an integral part of India. This statement is applicable to some states of the Northeast too, where Indian has connotations different from what the word is taken to signify elsewhere. Had the government gone for Arundhati Roy’s head for telling the truth, its actions would only have added further lustre to her celebrity status. What the Indian establishment has done instead is to let loose upon her the hounds of the media and the foxes of the chattering classes.

== Reflections in República ==
He also wrote bi-weekly essays in Republica titled "Reflection." The themes were literary as much as political loosely structured in the style of memoir and story about his personal experiences.

== To Be A Nepalese (2011) ==
The book is a meditation on the identity, complexity, and context of being a Nepali and exploration of its vulnerabilities. The book was originally written in Nepali as Nepaliya Hunalai (Nepali: नेपालीय हुनलाई) originally conceived as a working paper for Martin Chautari, Kathmandu, Nepal. The English version is an abridged version of the Nepali version, which was conceived first. The book was given a good reception in Nepali intelligentsia as a timely reflection on burning issues of citizenship, federalization, ethnicity, and other political notions as the book reflects on the issues and problems of Nepali identity in the present and the way forward in the future. The Nepali version of the book contained commentaries by 20 leading thinkers and politicians of Nepal.

== Fourth Estate ==
Lal wrote bi-weekly column Fourth Estate in Nepali Times starting January 2010 until October 2010. The column's themes related to journalism, media coverage of events, international trends in reporting and analysis, advertising aspect of media, relation of the Fourth Estate with the state and the public, and so forth.

== Criticism of PEON ==
He is known for being critical to what he dubs Permanent Establishment of Nepal (PEON), which, he opines, is a group usually consisting of a historically advantaged castes that resists any change to its hold of political, economic, and cultural power in Nepali society. He is vocal about inclusiveness of various groups and sections of Nepalis, clustered by geographic, social, cultural, and economic fault-lines, in the political process through diversity in state apparatuses. After the promulgation of Constitution of Nepal, 2072 that helped rise UML Chairman Khadga Prasad Sharma Oli to the position of the prime minister, he has repeatedly voiced concerns in his writings and interviews about Oli's wrong intentions regarding the rights of marginalized community. He criticized national media based in Kathmandu for failing to properly note the violence by the state police that resulted in the death of protesters and bystanders, especially in the Terai region.

== Advocacy Against Constitution of Nepal (2072) ==
Lal has publicly advocated against several key features of the Constitution of Nepal (2072). In an aftermath of promulgation of the constitution, he has given interviews and speeches and written extensively against some provisions that he believes to be discriminatory. Arguing that citizenship cannot be conflated with nationality, he commented that the "fast-tracked" constitution ensured a new forum for the hold of traditional hill elite through the "bloodline, masculinity and patriotism." He believes that the four key discriminatory provisions of the Constitution are: 1. citizenship provisions, especially targeting the Madhesis, 2. the implicit mention of Hinduism as the religion of the state, even though officially Nepal is designated secular, 3. demarcation of federal states, with the dominant ruling elite retaining its former power, and 4. the dissolution of equitable and positive discrimination provisions of the Interim Constitution of Nepal meant to redress wrongs of the historic injustice against many groups. As the controversy divided the whole country on fundamental issues of citizenship and federalism, he showed qualms over the formation of Eminent Persons Group (EPG) to look into the aspects of Nepal-India relationship for the prime minister Oli's visit to India, who he said, are "notable worthies" of the regime. He wrote in Catch News, an India-based publication: "For any sensible Prime Minister of Nepal, resolving the conflict over the contested constitution of the country would have been the topmost priority."
