= Sushma Joshi =

Nepalese writer

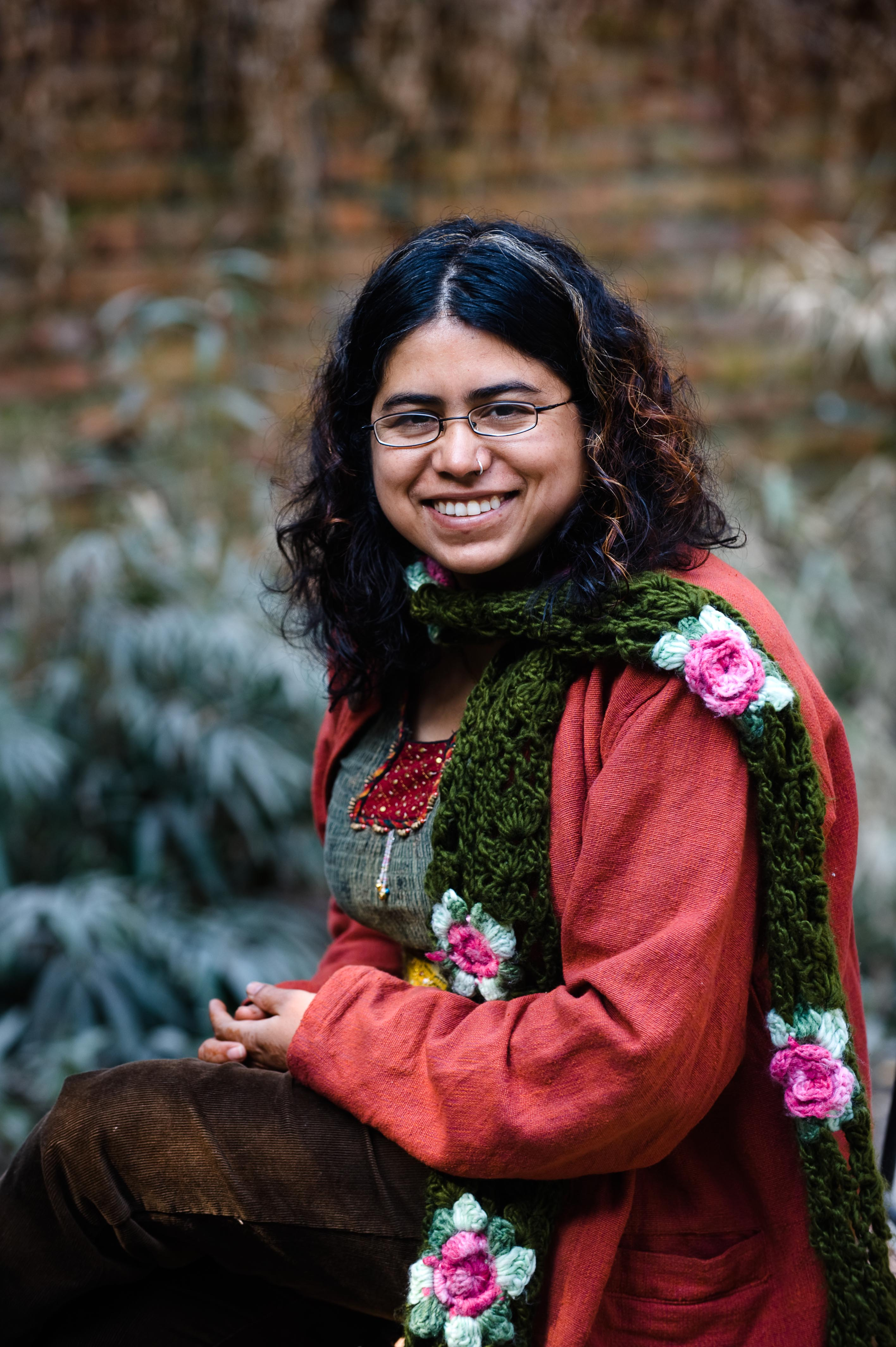
- Born: Kathmandu, Nepal
- Education: Brown University New School for Social Research (NY)
- Occupation: Writer filmmaker
- Writing career
- Genres: Fiction and non-fiction
- Notable work: End of the World
- Website: sushmasfiction.blogspot.com

Sushma Joshi (Nepali: सुष्मा जोशी) is a Nepali writer, filmmaker based in Kathmandu, Nepal. Her fiction and non-fiction deal with Nepal's civil conflict, as well as stories of globalization, migration and diaspora.

"The Prediction", a book of short stories that bring together stories of tradition and modernity, was published in 2013. Art Matters, a book of essays about contemporary art, was supported by the Alliance Française de Katmandou.

Her non-fiction reportage has appeared in The Kathmandu Post, The Nation Weekly, Indian Express (USA), Republica, and other publications.

== Career ==
From 1998 to 2000, Joshi worked with the Harvard School of Public Health to implement the Global Reproductive Health Forum, a health and rights program, in South Asia. She traveled to Mumbai, Delhi and Dacca to bring together a broad coalition of partners in this reproductive health and rights network.

In 2004, Joshi joined as staff writer at the newly formed The Nation Weekly, a political news weekly in Kathmandu.

She also consulted for the UNDP's Access to Justice research program from October 2004, during the height of the civil conflict. As part of a 6-member team, Joshi went to different areas of Nepal to document stories about human rights violations and the erosion of formal and informal justice systems.

In 2006, she made several short films in the directing program at the New York Film Academy in Paris, including "The Escape" which deals with the human rights violations which occurred during the People's War in Nepal. This film was accepted to the Berlinale Film Festival's Talent Campus, which was later renamed the Berlinale Talents, in 2007. She also wrote her play "I Killed My Best Friend's Father," about two girls and their friendship post-conflict, in 2007.

In 2008, she joined Chemonics to work in the Nepal Transition Initiative as a media officer, where she became engaged in a broad number of media projects related to the transition from conflict to peace. In 2009, she also headed a project for six months to train 20 journalists from rural newspapers to write on issues of Nepal's new Constitution. In 2010, she joined the Office of the United Nations High Commissioner for Human Rights in Kathmandu, where she spent the year working on the Nepal conflict report about the violations committed during the conflict with a research team. Between 2008 and 2010, she also consulted for the World Bank on their countrywide assistance strategy, traveling with the heads of World Bank, DFID and ADB to different locations to document the feedback received from local participants during the meetings.

== Plays ==
Her play, I Killed My Best Friend's Father, about two teenagers who survive the civil conflict in Nepal, was stage-read at the Arcola Theatre in London as part of the Kali TalkBack Festival on December 8, 2012.

== Film ==
Sound of Silence (1997) was screened at the New Asian Currents at the Yamagata Documentary Film Festival.

The Escape (2006), a short fiction film about a teacher targeted by rebels, was shot at the New York Film Academy in Paris, and was accepted to the Berlinale Talent Campus in 2007.

== Art ==
"The Quake", about the artist's survival after being buried in the 2015 Nepal earthquake, was exhibited at the World Bank in Washington DC as part of the 2020 Art of Resilience exhibition.

In 2004, Joshi had a solo exhibit "Blue Nepal" at Gallery Nine in Kathmandu. The exhibit was of 26 figurative paintings depicting the state of Nepal during the civil conflict.

Joshi's multimedia installation titled Jumla: A cyberphoto installation was accepted to the Eighth International Symposium on Electronic Art, or ISEA97 at the Art Institute of Chicago in 1997.

=== Education and influences ===
Joshi was born and grew up in Kathmandu. From age 8 to 12, she studied in Dowhill School, Kurseong, in the district of Darjeeling. She finished her education at Mahendra Bhawan and Siddhartha Vanasthali High School in Kathmandu.

Joshi went to the US at age 18 to study at Brown University. She graduated from Brown University in the US in 1996 with a BA in international relations. She also took workshops in fiction, autobiography and poetry, and classes in documentary production with the artist Tony Cokes. From 1999 to 2002, she was in graduate school at the New School For Social Research in New York, where she received an MA in anthropology. During the summers, she attended The Breadloaf School of English at Middlebury College, Vermont, and received another MA in English Literature in 2005. At Bread Loaf, she studied playwriting with the 1998–1999 Obie Award winning playwright Dare Clubb, as well as theatre directing and acting with Alan and Carol MacVey.
