= Tulasi Diwasa =

Nepalese writer (born 1941)

- तुलसी दिवस
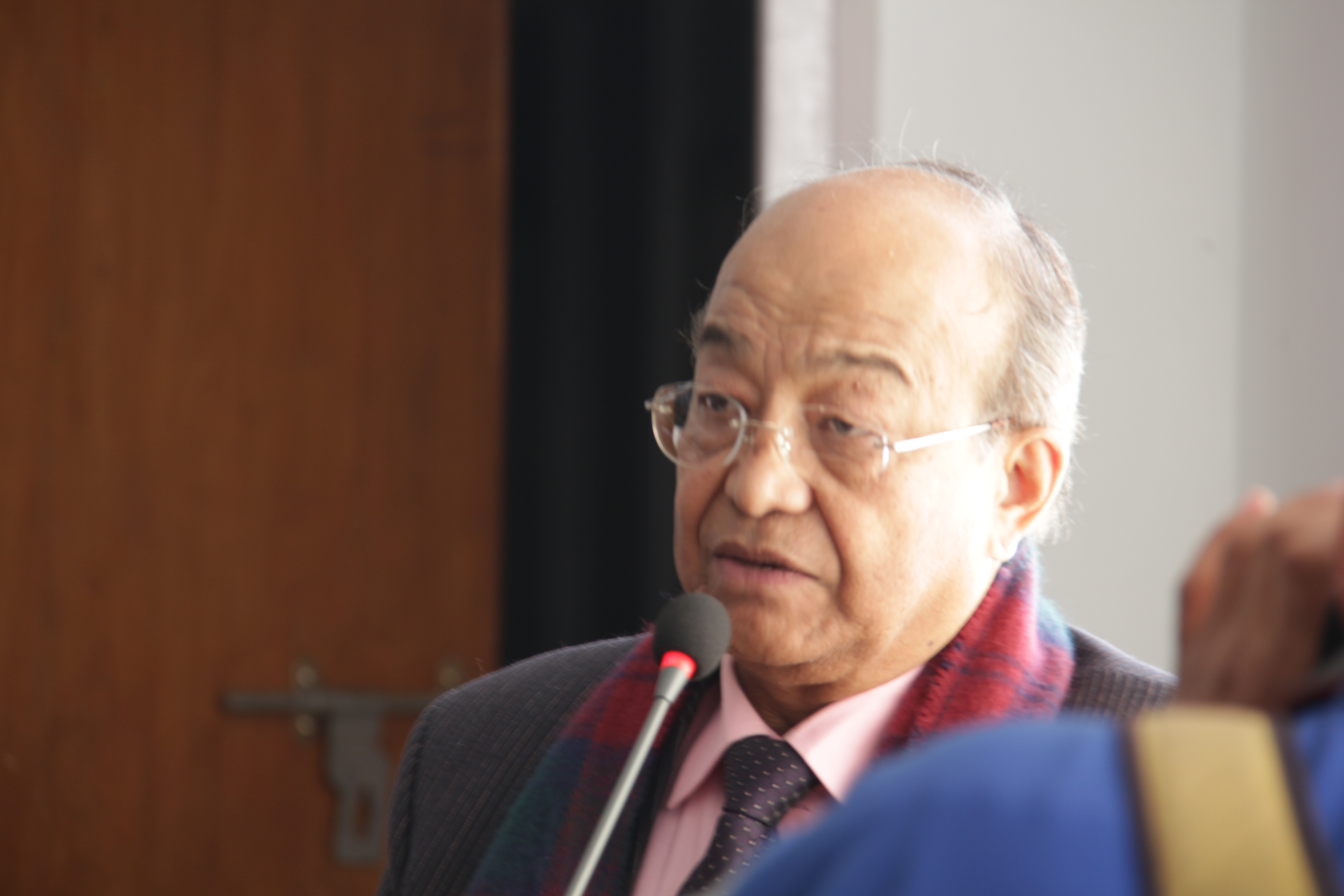
- Born: July 1941 (age 84–85); Dhankuta, Nepal
- Education: Dhankuta Degree College
- Occupations: Writer, folklore expert
- Writing career
- Language: Nepali
- Genres: Poetry, folk tales

Tulsi Prasad Joshi famously known as Tulasi Diwasa (Nepali: तुलसी दिवस) is a Nepalese litterateur and folklore expert. He is a prominent name in modern Nepali poetry. He was honoured with the title Bisista Sahitya Siromani at the International Poetry Festival in India in April 2013.

Professor Diwasa had served as Cultural Secretary at the Nepalese Embassy in the US and had also taught as a visiting professor at various universities abroad. He is now a life member of Nepal Academy and the President of Nepali Folklore Society (NFS).

Diwasa has served as professor of Nepali Literature for several years in Trichandra College and Padmakanya Campus at Kathmandu.

He has authored a dozen books on literature, folk culture and folklore of various tribes in Nepal.

His famous collection of folk tales ‘Nepali Lokkatha’ was published by Book Hill Publications under the ‘Classic Series’. The book collects 122 popular folk tales of various castes living in different parts of Nepal and Nepali-speaking people living outside Nepal.

== Literary works ==
- Nepali Lok katha (Nepali Folk Tale) 2032 B.S.
- Nepal ka baja haru (Musical instruments of Nepal) 2034 B.S.
- Nepali lok katha kehi adhyayan (Some Studies in Nepali Tale) 2035 B.S.
- Pradarshankari Dhimal Lok Sanskriti (Demonstrator Dhimal Folk Culture) 2035 B.S.
- Dhimal lok dharma ra sanskriti (Dhimal Folklore and Culture) 2039 B.S.
- Tulsi Divas ka kabita haru (Poems of Tulsi Diwasa) -2040 B.S. (1984)
- Folktales from Nepal (1997)
- Tulsi Diwas ki Kabitaye- Hindi (Poems of Tulsi Diwasa - New Delhi) 1997
