= Usha Sherchan =

Nepali writer and poet (born 1955)

- उषा शेरचन
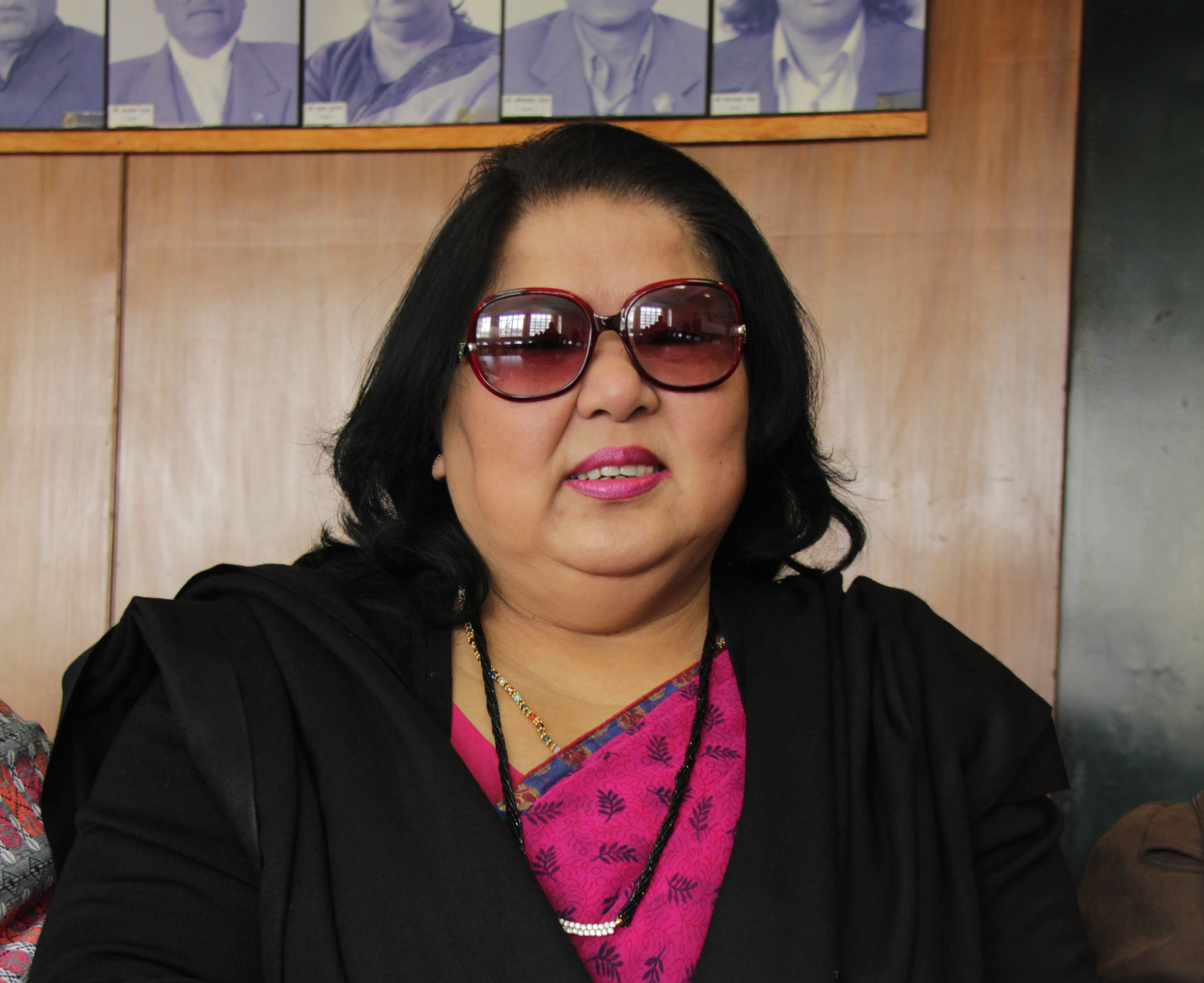
- Born: Usha Bhattachan; 22 August 1955 (age 71); Nalamukh, Pokhara, Kaski district
- Education: Prithivi Narayan Campus
- Occupations: Poet, lyricist, writer
- Notable work: Aadhi (2019)
- Spouse: D.B. Sherchan (m. 1982)
- Children: 2
- Parents: Jhapat Bahadur Bhattachan (father); Yam Kumari Bhattachan (mother)

Usha Sherchan (née Bhattachan; born 22 August 1955) is a Nepalese poet, lyricist and writer. She has published three collections of poetry, a collection of short stories and a novel. She has also written lyrics for five music albums. She writes about various social and feminism issues in her poems and stories. She is one of the few writers in Nepal who writes stories about queer people.

== Early life and education ==
Sherchan was born on 22 August 1955 (6 Bhadra 2012 BS) in Nalamukh in Pokhara city in a Thakali family to father Jhapat Bahadur Bhattachan and mother Yam Kumari Bhattachan. After completing her school level education (SLC), her parents urged her to get married but she decided to move to Kathmandu for further education. Her father worked for the royal family as in‐charge of Hima Griha palace in Pokhara and the royal family assisted her for her further education. She attended Ratna Rajya Laxmi Campus in Kathmandu. She then attended Prithvi Narayan Campus in Pokhara for her bachelor's studies.

== Literary career ==
In Prithivi Narayan Campus, she met various writers such as Saru Bhakta, Tirtha Shrestha, Prakat Prageni Shiva, Binod Gauchan etc. She used to write poems in her notebook since studying in RR Campus but didn't published it. Her friend Binod Gauchan saw Jindagi, one of her poems and sent it to Gorkhapatra, the national daily and her poem was published in Gorkhapatra in 1978. She, along with fellow writers started a writer's club named Pokhreli Yuwa Sanskriti Pariwar in Pokhara, directed by Durga Baral.

She published her first poetry collection titled Najanmeka Asthaharu in 1991. Her second book, Aksharharuka Shiwirbata is a collection of couplets (Muktak) and was published in 1999. Sarwakaleen Pinda Ra Jagritika Shankhaghosh, her third poetry collection was published in 2006.

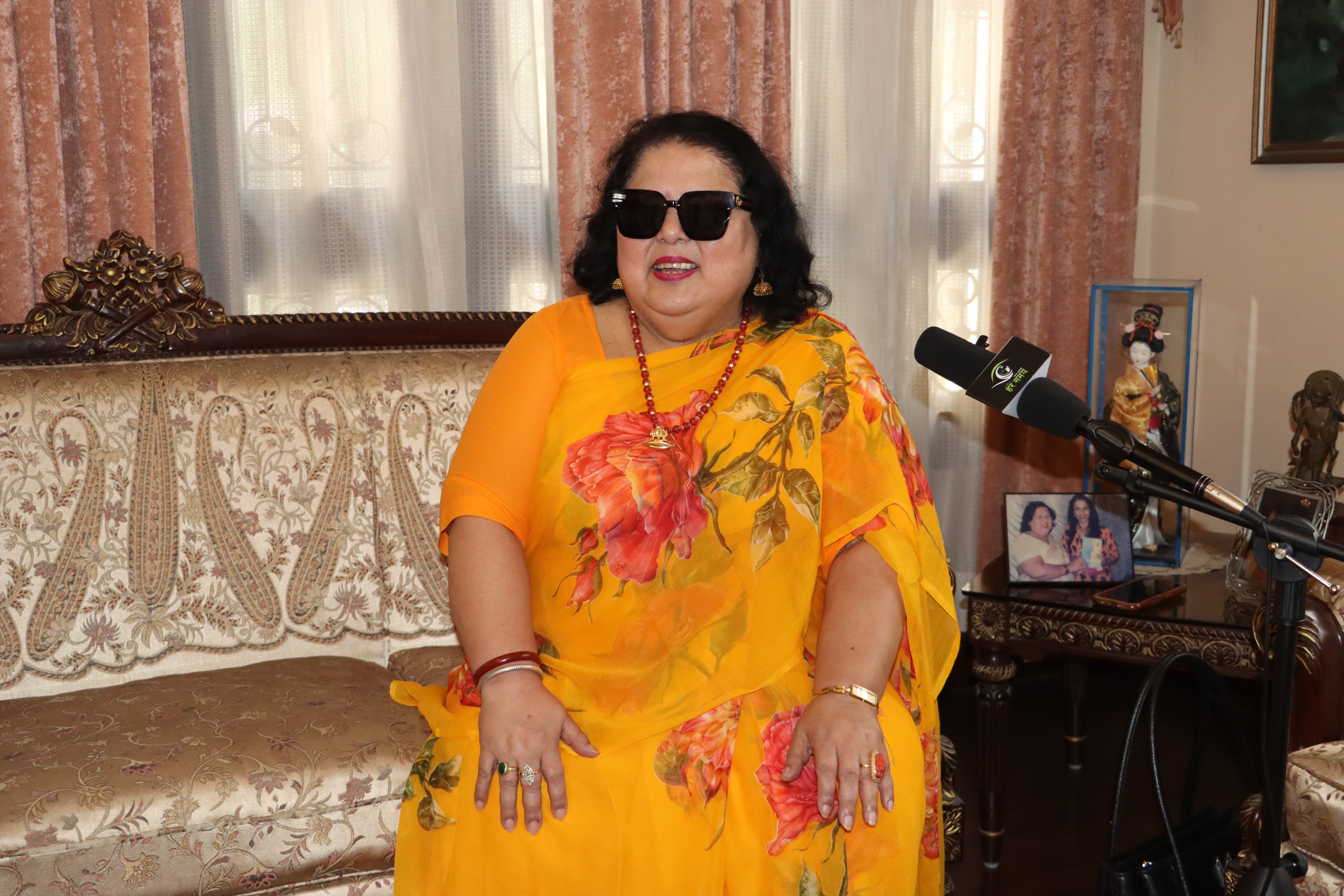
Usha Sherchan, Photo: Shuraj Thapaliya (30 Jestha 2082 BS)

In 2009, she published a short story about a closeted gay man being pressured to get married. In 2013, she published her first short story collection Tesro Rang. The stories featured multiple characters form LGBTQI+ community.

She published her first novel Aadhi in 2019. The novel is about a woman who is sexually assaulted.

== Awards ==
She has received around 13 awards such as Parijat Rastriya Pratibha Puraskar and the Ratnashree Suwarna Padak for her contribution to literature and music.

== Notable works ==
Books

Title	Genre	Year of Publication
Najanmeka Asthaharu	Poetry collection	1991
Aksharharuka Shiwirbata	Poetry collection	1999
Sarwakaleen Pinda Ra Jagritika Shankhaghosh	Poetry collection	2006
Tesro Rang	Short story collection	2013
Aadhi	Novel	2019

Music albums

Title	Release year	Role
Abhipsa	2001	Lyricist
Sanchayan	2002	Lyricist
Mero Mato Mero Geet	2003	Lyricist
Sambedan	2010	Lyricist
Aakash Chhune Rahar	2010	Lyricist

== Personal life ==
She married D.B. Sherchan in 1982. They have a son and a daughter.

== See also ==
- Bina Theeng Tamang
- Maya Thakuri
- Bimala Tumkhewa
