= Shivani Singh Tharu =

- Occupations: Novelist, television presenter, journalist

Shivani Singh Tharu is a Nepalese former talk show host, model, and playwright. She has written a novel named Kathmanduma Ek Din, which is a political thriller. She also came out in support of the #metoo movement.
