= Shiva Kumar Rai =

Indian writer of Nepali language

- Born: 26 April 1919; Rhenock, Sikkim
- Died: 22 July 1995 (aged 76); Darjeeling, West Bengal, India
- Occupation(s): Novelist, Short Story Writer, Poet, Politician
- Awards: Sahitya Akademi Award, Agam Singh Giri Smriti Puraskar

Shiva Kumar Rai (1919–1995) was a Nepali language writer and politician from Darjeeling, India. He won the Sahitya Akademi Award in 1978 for his collection of short stories Khaharey. He was the first Gorkha minister in the state of West Bengal after becoming a deputy minister in 1952.

== Biography ==
Shiva Kumar Rai was born on 26 April 1919 at Rhenock, Sikkim. His father Dhojbir Rai was post-master and because of the constant transfer of this father's post, Rai initially took his primary lessons at home. Only after coming to Kurseong did he have a regular education. Rai did his schooling at Pushparani Middle School in Kurseong and later at Darjeeling Government School in Darjeeling, where he met notable teachers such as Dharnidhar Sharma, Surya Bikram Gyawali and Parasmani Pradhan. He passed his metric examination in 1937. He completed his B.A. from St. Joseph's College, Darjeeling in 1939 and graduated from St. Xavier's College, Kolkata in 1941. After finishing college, in 1942, Rai became a secretary of Burma Saranarthi Mukti Samiti, a committee set up for helping the Burmese refugees of World War II. During this time, he came into contact with many Nepali refugees from Burma. While conversing with them, he felt the need to write about their turmoils in life, which took shape into his famous novel Dak Bangla, published in 1957.

Rai was very active in politics and was affiliated with the All India Gorkha League. In 1948, he was elected as an MLA from the erstwhile Jorebungalow constituency to the West Bengal Assembly. He was the Deputy Labour Minister of West Bengal from 1952 to 1957. Rai died on 22 July 1995.

== Literature ==
Shiva Kumar Rai started his writing career in the late 1930s when he was in college. His first work was published in a hand-written youth magazine titled Bansuri. He was also the editor of this magazine. His first printed work, a poem titled Birahi Ko Basanta, is found in Rup Narayan Singh-edited magazine Khoji. His poems and writings were published in journals such as Gorkha, Diyo, Yug Vani, and Sahitya Sroth. His first story titled Prakriti Putri was published in Sharda journal in 1944. His landmark book Frontier, a collection of stories, was published in 1956. To mark the centenary of his birth, Shiva Kumar Rai Janma Satvarshik Samaroha Samity (Kurseong) decided to publish the totality of his writings in three volumes as Shiva Kumar Rai Granthawali, which was edited by Chandra Sharma and Sujata Rani Rai.

His story Chaata won the prestigious Ratnashri Award in Nepal in 1969. In 1978, he won the Sahitya Academy Award for his short story collection Khaharey. In 1994, he was awarded the Agam Singh Giri Smriti Puraskaar by the Sikkim Sahitya Parishad and was felicitated by the Nepali Sahitya Sammelan, Darjeeling the same year.

== Literary works ==
- Daafe Chari (1954)
- Frontier (1956)
- Dak Bangla (1957)
- Yatra (1956)
- Khaharey (1976)
- Bara Dinner (1978)
- Shivakumar Rai Ka Saat Katha (1994)
- Machako Mol

== See also ==
- Nepali literature
- Sahitya Akademi Award to Nepali Writers
