= Kedar Gurung =

Indian writer and literary critic

- Born: 9 July 1948 (age 78); Sardong, Lingchom, Kingdom of Sikkim
- Occupations: Writer, educationist
- Awards: Padma Shri; Bhanu Puraskar
- Website: Official web site

Kedar Nath Gurung is an Indian educationist and writer of Nepalese literature, known for his satirical expressions. He was honored by the Government of India, in 2012, with the fourth highest Indian civilian award of Padma Shri.

== Biography ==
Kedar Nath Gurung was born on 9 July 1948 at the village of Sardong, Lingchom, in the Indian state of Sikkim. He did his early schooling at the local school in Lingchom and joined Turnbull High School, Darjeeling from where he passed the matriculation examination in 1960. Subsequently, he graduated from the Government College, Darjeeling. Gurung started his career as a teacher but, later, opened a book shop for living. He is the founder of Paschim Sikkim Sahitya Sansthan, a literary organization, based in West Sikkim of which he serves as the Vice President. He is the Chief Editor of Shrashta magazine for 22 years and is a former editor of Jhilka and Prakashan. He has also served Nepali Sahitya Akademi as a member, during the period from 1983 to 1987.

Gurung is credited with 15 publications composed of poetry, essays and literary criticisms. His works include four poetry collections, Aja Pheri Auta Samajhna Ra Naya Dinharoo (1970), Tarangamathi Lahar Lagera Aeko Arko Prahara (1973), Mahashathiharooko Pooja (1979) and Urlanchchan Chalharoo Samaya Ra Jwarbhataharoo Jastai (1995), a short story anthology, Seemanamathi Chadera Sunaeka Agla Hocha Kothaharoo (1994) and a collection of essays, Aphnai Pakshaharoo (1984). He is a recipient of the Bhanu Puraskar from the Sikkim Sahitya Parishad. The Government of India included him in the 2012 Republic Day honours list for the award of Padma Shri.

Kedar Gurung lives in Geyzing, in West Sikkim.

== Awards ==
- 2012: Fourth highest Indian civilian award of Padma Shri.

== See also ==
- Nepalese literature
