= Dhooswan Sayami =

Nepalese writer (1930–2007)

- धूस्वाँ सायमी
- Born: Govinda Bahadur Manandhar; 24 May 1930; Kathmandu, Nepal
- Died: 17 December 2007 (aged 77)
- Occupations: Writer, poet
- Spouse: Basundhara Sayami
- Parents: Narayan Bahadur Manandhar (father); Daan Maya Manandhar (mother)
- Awards: Order of Gorkha Dakshina Bahu (Fourth Class)

Govinda Bahadur Manandhar (24 May 1930 – 17 December 2007), popularly known as Dhooswan Sayami, was a Nepali writer who wrote primarily in Nepal Bhasa. He also wrote in Hindi and Nepali. He is well known for his contribution to the field of prose fiction. He is considered the first novelist in Nepal Bhasa.

== Biography ==
Govinda Bahadur Manandhar was born on 24 May 1930 (10 Jestha 1987 BS) in Jhochhen, Kathmandu to father Narayan Bahadur Manandhar and mother Daan Maya Manandhar. He belonged to a wealthy business family of Nepal which had principal business in Gaur. He was the first child of his parents. He obtained a Master's degree in Culture from Banaras Hindu University. He changed his firstname to Dhoowsan ( flower of dust in Nepal Bhasa) and family name to Sayami (a slur name for people for Manandhar).

Manandhar was one of the founding members of Chosaspasa (Newar writers' organization) and president of the Sahityakar Samsad. He was well known academically and also had some diplomatic tenure.

Manandhar was married to Basundhara Sayami. They had five children (four sons and one daughter). Dhooswan Manandhar died on 17 December 2007, at the age of 77.

== Published work ==
His published work included:

- Misā (Nepal Bhasa) - was awarded by Chosaspasa
- Matina (Nepal Bhasa)
- Gaṃkī (Nepal Bhasa) - translated into English as The Eclipse and into Nepali as Ganki
- Deepa (Novel)
- Palpasa (Novel)
- Fiswa (Novel)
- Lis (Novel)
- Agati (Novel)
- Nibha (Novel)
- Disha (Novel)
- Triveni (Play)
- Hraun Mikha (Play)

== Awards and honours ==
Manandhar was the lead character in Amrita Pritam's novel titled Adalat. He is considered the first novelist in Nepal Bhasa.

Awards received:

- Mahendra Bidhya Bibhosan
- Prabal Gorkha Dakshin Bahu
- Madhuparka Samman

== Legacy ==
Ganki-Basundhara award and Janamat-Deepa award were established in his honour.
