= Arbind Rimal =

Nepalese writer and intellectual

- Born: Kathmandu
- Political party: Nepal Communist Party
- Family: Saurav Rimal (grandson)

Arbindanath Rimal (Nepali: अरविन्दनाथ रिमाल) is a Nepalese writer and intellectual.

== Early life ==
Arbind Rimal hails from a middle-class Brahmin family in Kathmandu. It is believed that Rimal's grandfather was close to Ranas during Rana dynasty.

== Career ==
Rimal got into contacts with communism during his studies in India. He worked for about five years at the Embassy of the Soviet Union in New Delhi, with the publication of the Nepali-language publication of the embassy Soviet Bhumi. Through his links with the Soviet embassy, he accompanied King Mahendra on his visits to the Soviet Union.

In 1957, Rimal was elected to the Central Committee of the Communist Party of Nepal at the second party congress. He later renounced his communist ideals and broke with the party.

== Works ==
Rimal has written नेपाल थर्काइदिने १९ दिन ('19 days that shook Nepal'), an account of the events leading up to the 2006 Loktantra Andolan, and १९९७ देखि २०१७ साल ('From 1997 to 2017').
