= Bharat Jangam =

Novelist and freelance journalist of Nepal

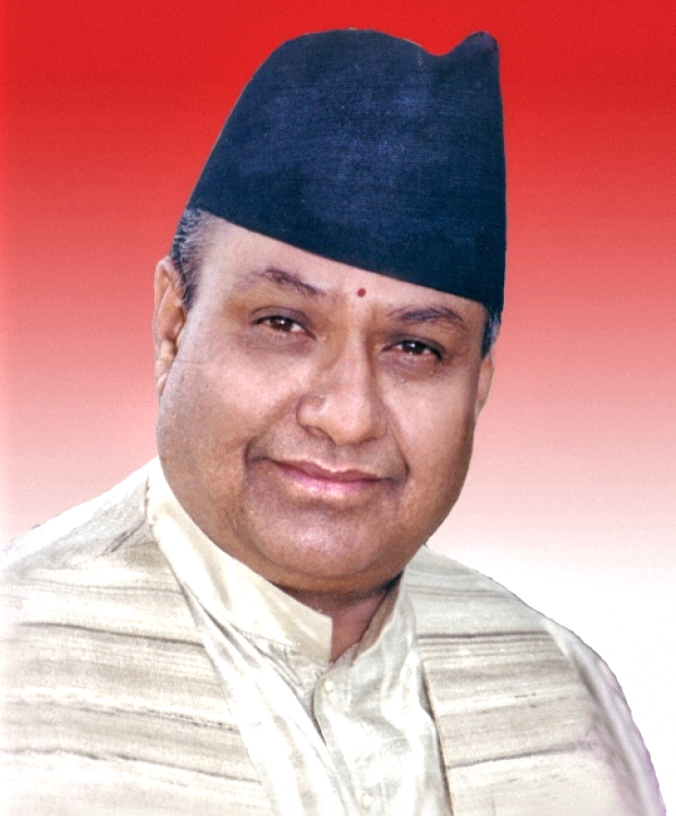
- Bharat Jangam
- Born: 25 November 1947 (age 78); Bhaktapur, Nepal
- Occupations: Writer, poet, journalist, Hindu activist, anti-corruption activist

Bharat Jangam, also known as Bharat Mani Jangam (Nepali: भरत जङम, born 25 November 1947) is a novelist and freelance journalist from Nepal. He wrote the book Kalo Surya (Nepali: कालो सूर्य). He lives in Kathmandu, Nepal.
