= Bhairav Aryal =

Nepalese writer

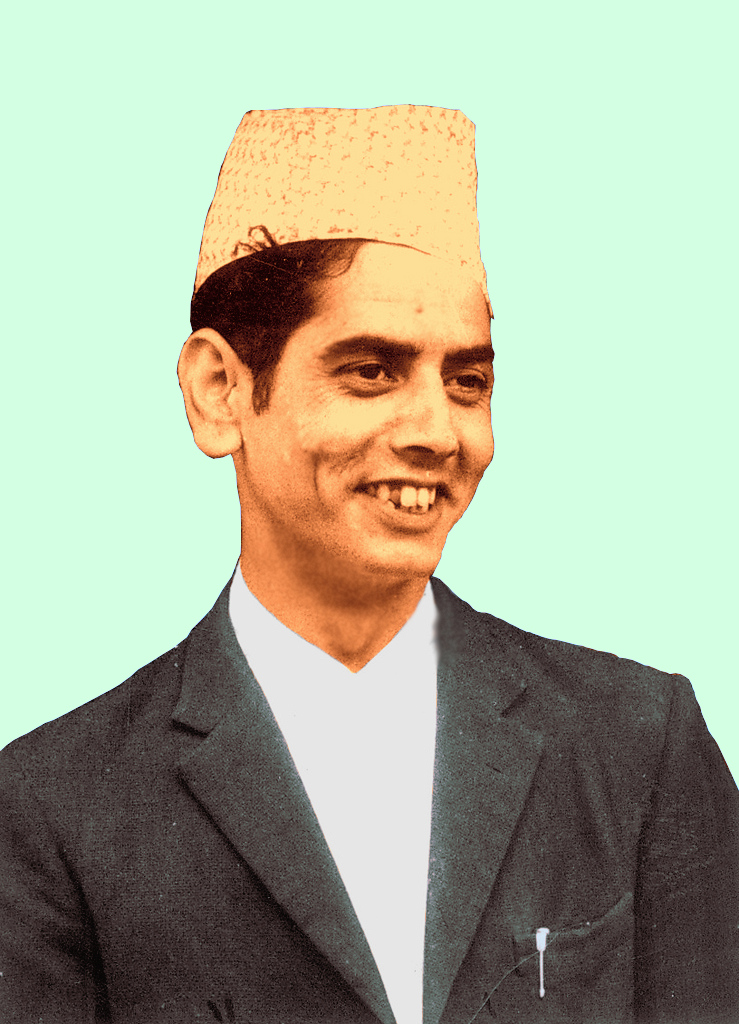
- Born: Tirtha Nath Aryal; 20 September 1936; Lalitpur, Nepal
- Died: 5 October 1976 (aged 40); Kathmandu, Nepal
- Occupation: Writer
- Writing career
- Genres: Comic Novels, Satire, Humour

Bhairav Aryal (Nepali: भैरव अर्याल), born Tirtha Nath Aryal (Nepali: तिर्थनाथ अर्याल), was a writer of Nepali literature. His writings are based on the social, political, religious and cultural aspects of Nepali lifestyle, and his satirical essay compilation 'Jaya Bhudi' (Nepali: जय भुँडी, lit. 'Hail Stomach') still remains one of the most popular works of Nepali Literature.

== Early life ==
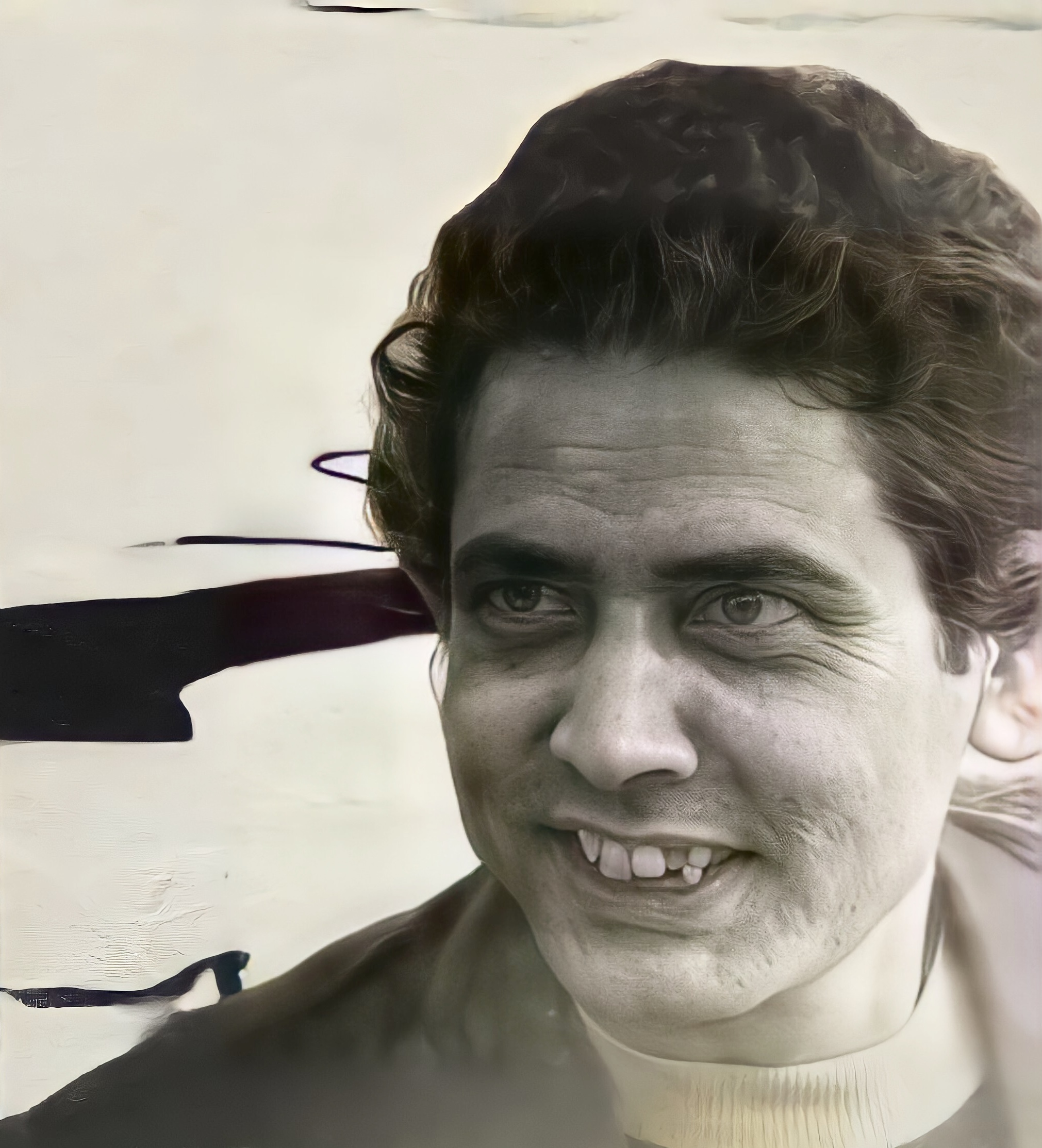
Bhairav Aryal

Aryal was born as the son of Khem Kumari Aryal and Homnath Aryal on 20 September 1936 in Kupondole, Lalitpur. His father worked as an accountant in Nepal Police. By the age of 12, Aryal married his wife Shova in 1948. They had three sons and three daughters.

Aryal demonstrated a strong interest in the Nepali and Sanskrit literature from his childhood and had decided to pursue his higher education in Nepali literature. He completed his MA in Nepali in 1969 and also took courses in Sanskrit.

Initially, Aryal worked as a teacher for four years at Pokhara and Kathmandu from 1954 to 1958. However, due to a throat ailment Aryal's voice had started to worsen because of which he was forced to leave the teaching profession.

Later, Aryal started his career as a journalist in a newspaper called "Haalkhabar". By the age of 21, he had been appointed as a full-time journalist in the government-run national daily newspaper Gorkhapatra and was later promoted in the editorial group. He also led the efforts to improve the "Madhuparka" magazine, which was a monthly literary magazine published by Gorkhapatra. He also played a strong role in the publication of another literary magazine called "Rachana".

== Literary Contributions ==
His first published poem was titled 'Nawa Jiwan', in the Prativa magazine, which was published in 1952. Later he also published satirical essays and poems. His first published book was a poem compilation titled Upaban. The next year he published Kaukuti, which marked his public entry in the satirical journey. In 1965, his most highly acclaimed literary work Jaya Bhudi was published, which included the popular satirical essays 'Jaya Bholi' and 'Jaya Bhudi'.

== Publications ==
Title	Notes	Ref.
Upaban	Poetry Collection	
The International Frog Conference	Essay, translated by Manjushree Thapa in English	
Samjhana	Memoir Personality with Rochak Ghimire	
Mutu Bhitra Asha	Muktak style	
Jaya Bhundi	Comedy, Essay	
Pakhnos	Comedy, Essay	

=== Edited works ===
- Sajha Katha, anthology of popular Nepali short–stories

== Death ==
Aryal took his own life on 5 October 1976.
