= Mahesh Chandra Regmi =

Nepalese historian

Mahesh Chandra Regmi (December 1929 – 10 July 2003) was a historian and archivist of Nepal. In 1977, he became the first Nepali to receive the Ramon Magsaysay Award, for creating the Regmi Research Series. It was in recognition of his “chronicling of Nepal’s past and present, enabling his people to discover their origins and delineating national options.” In honor of the contributions made by Regmi to the scholarship on Nepal, the Kathmandu-based academic NGO Social Science Baha instituted the annual Mahesh C. Regmi lecture series in 2003, the first of which was attended by Regmi himself, just weeks before his death.

== Early life ==
Born in Kathmandu in December 1929 to a family of musicians (who played the sitar), Regmi obtained school level education at home before completing four years of BA education at Kathmandu's Trichandra College, then affiliated with Patna University. After trying out his hand in book and cloth trade in Calcutta, Regmi returned to Nepal just before the end of the Rana regime in February 1951. He began his professional life with the Nepali government in the immediate aftermath of the demise of the Rana oligarchy. He worked for the Department of Industries for several years before being dismissed for unspecified reasons in late 1955. Looking for something to do, he met an American academic who was researching the agricultural system of Nepal and was looking for someone to translate some documents into English. In an interview done in August 1992 by the German anthropologist Martin Gaenszle, Regmi recalled, “These were mainly reports of the land reforms commission of 1952-53. I tried to translate them and I got interested in this thing, one thing led to another and in 1957 I started this thing.” The ‘thing’ he was referring to was the Regmi Research Centre Pvt Ltd. Mahesh Chandra Regmi, one of Nepal's foremost historians, died in the early hours of 10 July 2003.

== Regmi Research Centre ==
Regmi functioned as a solitary historian at the Regmi Research Centre (sometimes called Institute), administratively helped by a small group of non-academic assistants, including, in the later years, his brother Rabish C Regmi and son Suresh C Regmi. Individuals such as Shankar M Amatya and Krishna M Arjyal helped Regmi go through thousands of documents held at the Records Office (‘Lagat Phant’) of the Department of Land Revenue in the Ministry of Finance, the Ministry of Foreign Affairs, the library of the Ministry of Law and Justice, the Department of Survey, offices under the Guthi Corporation which look after the lands that once paid for the upkeep of Kathmandus temples and other public structures, and the Pashupatinath Temple. Documents from the above-mentioned sources were collected most intensively in the 1960s and the 1970s and were transcribed into thick volumes. These volumes, which were later referred to as the Regmi Research Collections, filled up the shelf space in his study and became Regmis personal archive based on which he produced 14 books on the economic and political history of 18th and 19th century Nepal.

The first of these books was Some Aspects of Land Reform in Nepal (1960). It was followed by the four-volume study entitled Land Tenure and Taxation in Nepal (1963, 1964, 1965, 1968, Institute of International Studies, University of California at Berkeley; reprinted in a single volume in 1978 by Ratna Pustak Bhandar, Kathmandu). In 1971, Regmi published A Study in Nepali Economic History 1768–1846 in the Bibliotheca Himalayica series (started by late H K Kuloy) of the Manjusri Publishing House and five years later, the University of California Press published his Landownership in Nepal. These two works along with the earlier four-volume study established Regmi as a world-class scholar and in 1977 he became the first Nepali to receive the Ramon Magsaysay Award, receiving it for the “journalism, literature, and creative communication arts” category. The award was granted to him in recognition of his "chronicling of Nepals past and present, enabling his people to discover their origins and delineating national options."

Regmi published two books in the next two years: Thatched Huts & Stucco Palaces: Peasants and Landlords in 19th Century Nepal (1978, Vikas) and Readings in Nepali Economic History (1979, Kishor Vidya Niketan). In the decade of the 1980s, he published The State and Economic Surplus (1984, Nath Publishing House) and An Economic History of Nepal, 1846-1901 (1988, Nath Publishing House). In the following decade Regmi published Kings and Political Leaders of the Gorkhali Empire 1768-1814 (1995, Orient Longman), and Imperial Gorkha: An Account of Gorkhali Rule in Kumaun 1791-1815 (1999, Adroit). His last book Nepal: An Historical Miscellany (2002, Adroit) is a collection of various primary and secondary texts, translated into English from the original Nepali with additional commentary. At least ten of Regmis books are of outstanding quality and it is certain that they will continue to be the most influential texts of economic history of 18th and 19th century Nepal for at least another generation. He is the most appreciated but less read historian of Nepal.

== Paying for His Work ==
Regmi's decision to open a private research institute in Nepal of the late 1950s was definitely extremely bold. So the question remains, how did he finance his scholarly operation? Regmi's lifetime work was mainly supported through the sale of several services, most of which have by now been abandoned. These included the Nepal Press Digest (weekly summaries in English from the Nepali language press), the Nepal Press Report (daily summaries of the Nepali Press), the Nepal Recorder (translations of Nepali laws), Nepal Miscellaneous Series and the monthly Regmi Research Series.

Among these, the first four contained information that was useful to both native and foreign academics and members of the expatriate development community in Nepal. The Series, which lasted from 1969 to 1989 contained English translations of important historical documents from the Regmi Research Collection and short historical analyses – often drafts of narratives that later appeared elsewhere – written by Regmi himself. It also contained short articles written by others, often translated from their original Nepali into English. This periodical was of interest mainly to serious researchers of Nepali society. In the 1992 interview by Gaenszle, Regmi justified his decision to discontinue the Series in December 1989: "Well, the first thing was that it was selling only about forty copies, forty subscriptions. It did not generate enough resources to hire people, assistants, things like that. That was the main problem. Another problem was that I couldnt find anyone with the competence to translate the old documents in the style I used. So it was a one-man show." After crossing the age of 60, he added, he didn't "want to work nine hours a day. Thats not the goal of life. And then I decided to concentrate on my own writing, not just to give up the Regmi Research Series and sit quietly, playing with my grandchildren. What I want to do is spend more time on my own work."

In the beginning of his career, Regmi's work was supported by the University of California at Berkeley through facilitation by Leo E Rose. The latter had come into contact with Regmi in 1957 when he had come to Nepal to do research on its diplomatic history. Berkeleys grant to Regmi in 1960 was processed through its Institute of International Studies and it allowed him to work on the magisterial four-volume study of land-tenure and taxation. These volumes were published by the Institute between 1963 and 1968. However this connection also brought some controversy for Regmi when it was revealed that the Institutes Himalayan Border Country Research Project through which Rose had channeled funds to him in the mid-1960s was funded by the Advanced Research Projects Agency of the US Defense Department. This sinister university-government connection was discovered in India in 1968. The revelation led the Indian government to immediately terminate the Projects involvement in its Himalayan regions.

When asked about this connection by Gaenszle in 1992, Regmi said, "I said: look, I dont know, I get paid for doing research on Nepal, I dont care where the money comes from….They gave me a grant, they never told me what to do. They said: You (can) do what you want to do. And I said I want to do land tenure and taxation in Nepal. It started with a one volume project, one became two, two became three, three became four. So they financed all that." The Institutes grant for Regmi was discontinued in 1969 when the Himalayan borders project was scrapped. However Regmi continued to cherish his friendship with Rose long after this controversy and thanked him on numerous occasions in many of his books for the support given.

The 1977 Ramon Magsaysay Award, granted to Regmi near the middle of his career as a historian, also came at a crucial juncture in his life. Apart from the international recognition which, as Regmi has acknowledged, "bolstered both his self-confidence and his credibility", the Award carried a grant of US$20,000. This gave him enough economic security to continue with his research and publications, including his 1979 book Readings in Nepali Economic History and some of his periodicals. As Regmi told this writer, but for the Magsaysay Award, the Regmi Research Series would have been discontinued even earlier than 1989.

== The Legacy ==
Although at times Regmi allowed certain historians such as Fr Ludwig F Stiller, (celebrated author of, among others, The Rise of the House of Gorkha (1973) and The Silent Cry: The People of Nepal, 1816-1839 (1976)) to make extensive use of his original document collection, it seems fair to say that Regmi was not particularly interested in reproducing his "school" of Nepali historiography. It is not clear whether he ever sought to mentor members from the next generation of Nepali historians, but it seemed clear that by the early 1990s, when this writer met him, he seemed little interested. Neither was he interested in socialising with other Nepali academics, some of whom he thought did not deserve the reputation they had garnered on the basis of pedestrian work.

Regmi resisted most invitations to participate in other academic forums or seminars, and he rarely contributed articles to journals other than his own. As far as this writer knows, apart from an article published in Asian Survey in the early 1960s, and two articles published in Contributions to Nepalese Studies in 1975 and 1976, Regmi did not publish elsewhere, preferring instead to invest his energies in writing his books and producing his periodicals. Scholars (including this writer) who approached him for contributions often felt frustrated by his unwillingness to accede. In later years, it was also difficult to engage him in conversation, for Parkinsons disease had begun to take its toll. He would answer specific questions and then revert to recalling his past work and current obsessions.

In a rare appearance in a 1990 seminar entitled "Kathmandu city and the Guthi system today", Regmi presented a paper highlighting the adverse impact on the civic life of Kathmandu resulting from the disappearance or institutional violations of this native mode of endowment-based philanthropy. But this presentation by the foremost scholar of the Guthi system began and ended with an apology. He stated, "The research has been inadequate and the presentation sketchy. The saving grace is that my aim in this paper has been to stimulate thought, not to present cut and dried solutions. If, therefore, the points I have made here provoke you to sit up and think on how we may be able to preserve and build on the initiative and liberality of our ancestors in using a portion of their wealth to construct and maintain temples, shrines, and other public assets in this city of ours, my efforts will not have gone waste."

Some of the obituaries published since his death have lamented the fact that the wealth of insights Regmi had produced in his research works had not been used by the Nepali state. But Regmi himself was much more modest about the use of his work for Nepals development. This he made clear in a short write-up in Himal in 1993 titled "Why I write Economic History": "I do not feel that there is any need for me to make an attempt to justify my research and writings on the economic history of Nepal in terms of their relevance to the mundane issues of economic development and political evolution. For me, far more inspiring and ennobling has been the feeling of participation, at whatsoever elementary level it may be, in the eternal quest for knowledge. In the course of exploring and recording a previously unknown and uncharted aspect of the history of the Nepali people and, therefore, of mankind as a whole, I have the feeling of having left my footprints on the sands of time. "
