= Buddha Sayami =

Nepali politician

Buddha Sayami (Nepali: बुद्ध सायमी; 1944 – 26 December 2016) was a Nepalese poet and Newa politician, born in Kathmandu. He wrote poetry in Nepal Bhasa, the Newari language. Sayami was the president of Newaa Deygoo. He was awarded the Rastriya Pratibha Puraskar and was elected in 2008 as representative to the Constituent Assembly election by the Nepa Rastriya Party. He died at a hospital in Jawalakhel in 2016 at the age of 72, from complications of diabetes.

He published two books of poetry: Ji: Jigu Vartaman/Me: My Present (1974), Jindagi: Bayan Wagu Hi Chetanaya Mi/Life: Spilled Blood and the Fire of Knowledge (1997) and a commentary on contemporary Nepal Bhasa poetry: Kawita: Thaunya Mikhan/Poetry: In Contemporary Eyes.
