= Kedar Nath Neupane =

Nepalese educator and author

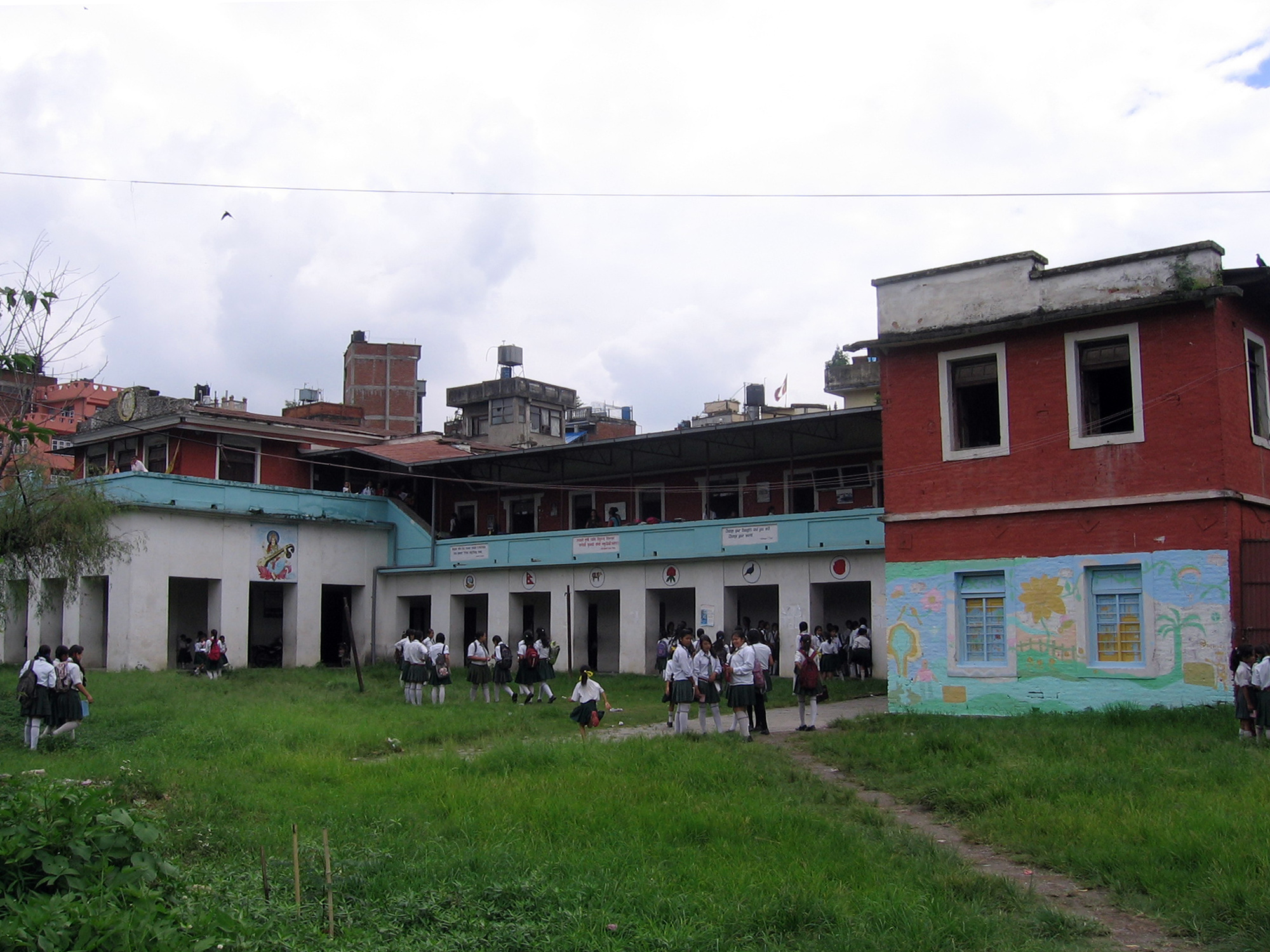
Kanya Mandir High School, Kathmandu

Kedar Nath Neupane (Nepali: केदारनाथ न्यौपाने) (29 November 1927 - 13 October 1971) was a Nepalese educator and author. He was one of the founders and headmaster of Kanya Mandir High School at Nhyokha, Kathmandu.

Neupane was born in Kathmandu to father Damodar Nath and mother Sumitra Neupane. He held Master of Arts (MA) and Bachelor of Education (BEd) degrees, and worked as a teacher. He was a champion of teaching Nepal Bhasa as a subject in school even though it was not his mother tongue, and played a central role in having it included in the curriculum of Kanya Mandir High School.

In 1969, Neupane was named an advisor to the National Educational Advisory Board. He has also served as secretary of Chwasā Pāsā, a Nepal Bhasa literary organization, and worked to promote it along with cultural expert Satya Mohan Joshi and litterateurs Kedar Man Byathit and Dhunswa Sayami.

Neupane wrote in Nepali and Nepal Bhasa. He has published a book entitled Kehenyata Pati (केहेँयात पति) ("Letter to Younger Sister") in Nepal Bhasa. It appeared in 1952.
