= Manu Brajaki =

Nepali writer (1942–2018)

- मनु ब्राजाकी
- Born: Chetman Singh Bhandari; 3 August 1942; Aurahi, Mahottari, Nepal
- Died: 2 February 2018 (aged 75); Lalitpur, Nepal
- Other names: Sagar Nasratya, Hemanta Hari
- Occupation: Writer
- Awards: Sajha Puraskar, Padmashree Sahitya Puraskar

Chetman Singh Bhandari, better known as Manu Brajaki (Nepali: मनु ब्राजाकी; 1942-2018) was a Nepalese writer. He wrote multiple short stories and gazal in his lifetime. He was known for his use of regional themes and elements in his works.

== Biography ==
Brajaki was born as Chetman Singh Bhandari in a Chhetri zamindar family on 3 August 1942 (19 Shrawan 1999 BS) in Aurahi, Mahottari district. He published his first story in 1962 in Anchal Sandesh, a Janakpur based magazine .

== Awards ==
He won the prestigious Sajha Puraskar for his short story collection Timri Swasni ra Ma in 2046 BS (c. 1989). He was awarded with Padmashree Sahitya Puraskar for his short story collection Annapurnako Bhoj for the year 2070 BS (c. 2013). He also received the Jagadish Ghimire Smriti Puraskar in 2074 BS (c. 2017).

In 2017, he was awarded the Pahalman Singh Swar Lifetime Literary Award.

== Notable works ==
Short story collections

- Avamulyan
- Aakashko Phal
- Timri Swasni ra Ma
- Bhabishya Yatra
- Paradarshi Manchhe
- Manu Brajakika Laghu Katha
- Annapurnako Bhoj (Annapurna's Feast)

Gazal collections

- Gazal Ganga
- Kandaka Phoolharu
- K hereko Ye Jindagi!

== Personal life ==
He died on 2 February 2018 (19 Magh 2074 BS) due to brain haemorrhage. He is survived by his wife, a son and a daughter.
