= Vishnu Raj Atreya =

Nepalese writer (1944–2020)

Vishnu Raj Atreya (Latosaathi)
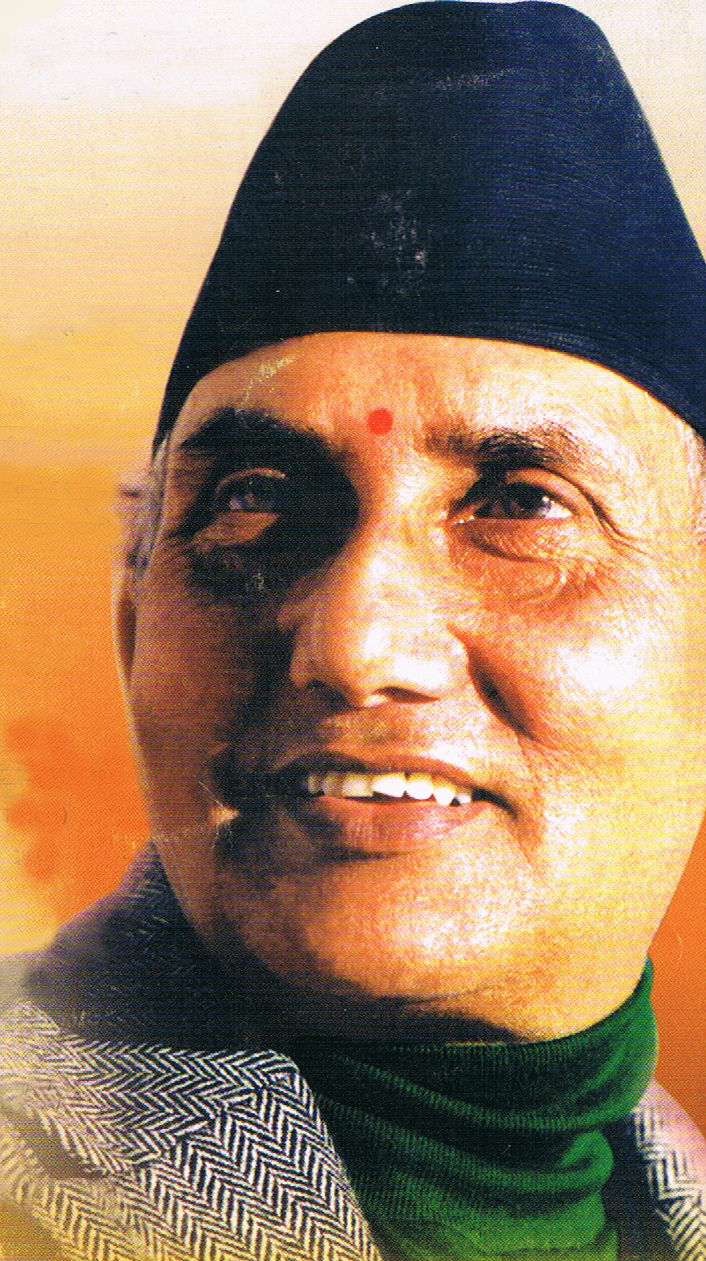
- Atreya in 2000
- Born: 10 November 1944; Kapilbastu, Nepal
- Died: 18 July 2020 (aged 75)
- Other name: Latosathi
- Education: Sampurnanand Sanskrit Vishwavidyalaya; Tribhuvan University
- Occupations: Poet and scholar
- Spouse: Arya Atreya

Vishnu Raj Atreya (Nepali: विष्णुराज आत्रेय; 10 November 1944 – July 18, 2020) was a Nepali writer and poet, who wrote in Nepali, Sanskrit and Awadhi. He used the title Latosaathi (Nepali: लाटोसाथी) (meaning: mute friend) in his poetry works after 1963. He is considered to be the first person to start writing Haiku in Sanskrit language.

== Life ==
=== Early life ===
Atreya was born on 10 November 1944 as the first son of Dev Raj Upadhayaya and Sharada Devi in Rashminilaya, Kapilvastu, Nepal. His father Dev Raj and grandfather Rashmi Raj both were Sanskrit scholars. He was intelligent since his childhood. He attained his basic education under the custodianship of his father (who was a teacher in Tauleshwor Sanskrit Pathshala) and his grandfather Rashmi Raj. He started his education from Harihar Sanskrit Vidhyapeeth, Khidim (now affiliated to Nepal Sanskrit University). He then went to India for further education, where he completed undergraduate in Sankhya-Yog-Puran-History from Banaras Hindu University, Varanasi. He finished his master's degree in Navya Vyakarana from Sampurnanand Sanskrit Vishwavidyalaya, Varanasi. He further completed master's degree in Nepali and Political Science from Tribhuvan University, Nepal. He then completed his PhD in Navya Vyakarana from Sampurnanand Sanskrit Vishwavidyalaya, Varanasi, India. He was visiting professor at Banaras Hindu University, Varanasi, Sampurnanand Sanskrit Vishwavidyalaya, Varanasi, India and professor at Nepal Sanskrit University, Valmiki Vidyapeeth, Kathmandu, Nepal. He retired after 47 years of teaching.

=== Family ===
He was married to Guneshwori Acharya (Arya Atreya after marriage) in July 1974.

=== Health ===
In early 2019, Atreya suffered from Gallbladder cancer. He was admitted to the Rajiv Gandhi Cancer Institute and Research Centre, India, for four months. He has been undergoing treatment at Patan Hospital, Lalitpur. After he was diagnosed with this condition, he started writing a novel titled 'वररुची कात्यायन' (Vararuchi Katyayan) which is in press for publication.

=== Death ===
Atreya died on July 18, 2020, at the age of 75, due to gallbladder cancer.

== Latosaathi title ==
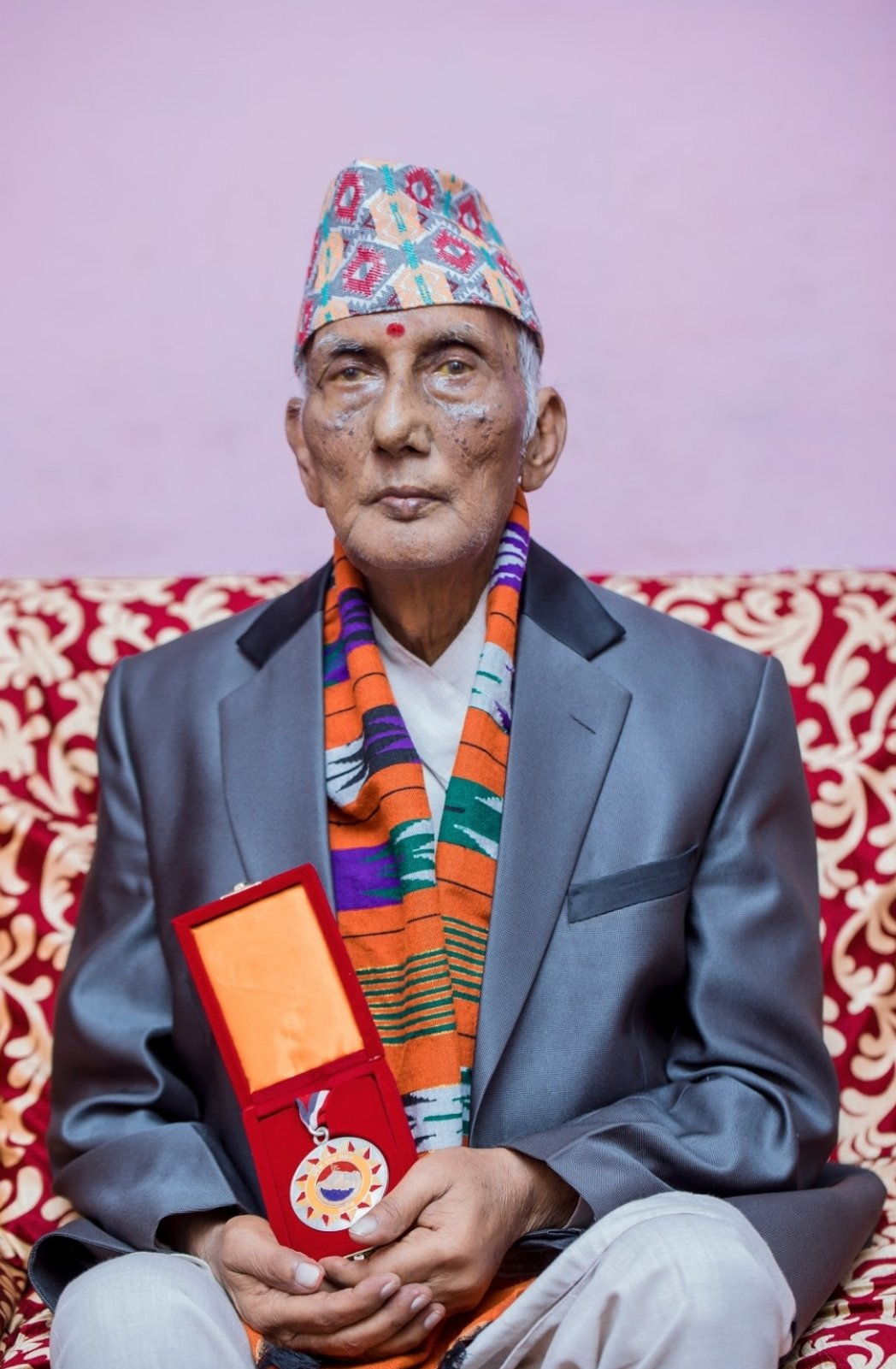
Dr. Atreya was awarded Pradesh Ratna on 2019 for his contribution on Language and Literature.

Although his name is Vishnu Raj Atreya, he introduced himself as 'Latosaathi' since 1963 A.D. He believed that literature itself is mute and a person adds life and sense to it. This might be the reason that he added 'Latosaathi' as his literary title. He has expressed this view in his first short-epic 'कपिलवस्तु' (Kapilvastu) as:

"लिपि छ मूक लेखेनी मूक लेखक पनि स्वयं म मूकै छु।"

The script is silent, the writing is silent and me being the main writer am also silent.

Poet of the nation, Madhav Prasad Ghimire writes his view on Atreya's Latosathi title as: "I think Atreya was influenced from द्वा सुपर्णा सयुजा सखाया (dwa suparna sayuja sakhaya) from Rigveda. The metaphore of that bird of Rigveda is life that undergoes karma and god who looks after as a witness. As such, Latosathi is that clever friend who looks after his friends as a witness. If I would ask him about this, he would not speak but write sarcasm on deformed society and social Distortion and simply keep on laughing."

== Works ==
=== Social works ===
Atreya has been involved in various social works throughout his life. After starting his studies in Varanasi, he became a member of Nepal Student Organisation (1957 A.D.). In the year 1966 A.D. he then became Literature and Culture Minister of same organisation. He was editor of 'छात्रदूत' published by Nepal Sanskrit Student Council. Similarly, he was founding member of Baneras Sahitya Samparka Samiti in 1968 A.D. and organised various cultural and religious programmes to encourage Nepali students studying abroad.

He also became vice president of Kapilvastu Samaj, secretary of Panini Award Committee (1991 A.D.), member of Noorganga Pratibha Puraskar Guthi (1992 A.D.), executive member of Dadhiram Marasani Smriti Pratisthan (1994 A.D.), member of Nepal Pragya Pratisthan, vice-chairman of Gaukalyan Sangh, advisor of Kapilvastu Samaj, convenor of Rupak Smriti Pratisthan, member of Madan Puraskar Guthi etc. He had also played important role in erecting statue of Bhawani Bhikshu in Kapilvastu, Nepal.

=== Religious works ===
Atreya was born in religious family background which made him very active in religious activities. He started his early education following Gurukul tradition since his childhood. While he was student in Harihar Sanskrit Vidhyapeeth itself, he started writing poem by worshipping stone as:

"पाषाण मान्दछु तँलाई म देव रूप"

Stone, I consider you to be the form of God.

He had recited Devi-Bhagavata Purana and Bhagavata Purana while he was studying in Varanasi, India which shows his religious inclination. His daily life was influenced by Eastern philosophy therefore he performed jap, tap meditation, yoga daily until he became physically weak (July 2020). He was a national member of Vishwa Hindu Mahasangh and travelled around Nepal and abroad to attend and present papers in Hindu conferences.

=== Educational works ===
He has served as a professor of Navya Vyakaran in Nepal Sanskrit University for seventeen years (1996–2013). Before joining Nepal Sanskrit University he worked as a reader in Tribhuvan University (1988–1996), visiting professor in Sampurnanand Sanskrit University, Banaras Hindu University (1980–1988) and lecturer and reader in Tribhuvan University (1970–1980). Since 2004, he has been member of Pragya Sabha, and contributing to scholar areas. He was a producer and director of a Sanskrit Learning Program "Samskritam" in Nepal Television for six months in 1989.

=== Acting in plays and cinemas ===
Since his hostel life itself, Atreya used to write, direct and act in plays. While he was studying in Varanasi, he used to visit his home town Kapilvastu during summer vacation and attend and participate in cultural programs. Once he wrote, directed and acted in a play which plots saving a royal swan of Siddhartha Gautam on a yearly program at Yashodhara Lower Secondary School, Taulihawa, Nepal.

Atreya has also played in various Nepali movies. He started his movie appearance as a role of professor in a black and white movie titled 'मनको बाँध' (Manko baandh), which is a first film produced by Royal Nepal Film Corporation, directed by Prakash Thapa. He also acted as a friend of the main actor in the movie 'सिन्दुर' (Sindur). In the year 1999, he also acted as Gajadhar Soti in a historical movie titled Bhanubhakta Acharya directed by Yadav Kharel. He has also directed and led Sanskrit plays in Kalidash Janmajayanti program organised in Ujjain, India.

=== As lyricist ===
Atreya has also contributed to the Nepali Music Industry. His compositions "कोटी कोटी नेपालीको एउटै भावना छ" (Millions of Nepalis have same feelings), "लाख वर्ष बाँच तिमी, शुभकामना" (Be alive for 1 million years, best wishes), "मातृ महिमा" (Matri Mahima), "गणेश चालिसा" (Ganesh Chalisa), "हनुमान भजन" (Hanuman Bhajan) are recorded.

== Publications ==
Nepali
Title	Year of first publication	First edition Publisher	Notes	Ref.
Dhakre (ढाक्रे)	1967	Sajha Prakashan, Kathmandu	Short-epic	
Kapilbastu (कपिलवस्तु)	1967	Ratna Pustak Bhandar, Kathmandu	Short-epic	
Hami Bhitra ko Ma (हामीभित्रका म)	1979	Sajha Prakashan, Kathmandu	Novel	
Himalayo Nama Nagadhiraja (हिमालायो नाम नगाधिराज)	1982	Babu Madhav Prasad Sharma, Varanashi	Research	
Arjyal Vamsavali ra Kulwritta (अर्ज्याल वंशावली र कुलावृत्त)				
Bhu-Bhashika (भू-भाषिका)				
Nepali Hanuman Chalisa (नेपाली हनुमान चालिसा)	1998			
Kavita ma Latosathi (कवितामा लाटो साथी)	2002	Kapilvastu Sahitya Samaj, Kapilvastu		
Athato Jalan Gigyasa (अथातो जलान जिज्ञासा)	2002	Bhagirath Publication Pvt. Ltd., Kathmandu	Critics	
Bheteka Pustak Tipeka Kura (भेटेका पुस्तक टिपेका कुरा)	2002	Bharat Bamshi Chudal, Kathmandu	Essays	
Nepali Sahitya ki Pratibha Varati Kharel (नेपाली साहित्यकी प्रतिभा भारती खरेल)		Bharati Kharel Pratisthan, Kathmandu	Biography	
Aansu ma Prakash (आँशुमा प्रकाश)	2005	-	Elegiacs	
Naya Meghdoot (नयाँ मेघदूत)		Advance Academy, Kathmandu		
Shree Gandaki Devghat Mahatmya (श्री गण्डकी देवघाट महात्म्य)	2006	Vishwa Hindu Ekta Parishad, Kathmandu	Short-epic	
Somtirtha ra Supadeurali (सोमतीर्थ र सुपादेउराली)	2017	Supadeurali Mandir Sanrakshan Samiti	Novel	
Shree Swasthani (श्री स्वस्थानी)	2007	Shree Ramyog Pashupati Sanyash Ashram	Short-epic	
Swasthani-Bratakatha (स्वस्थानी-व्रतकथा)	2010	Babu Madhav Prashad Sharma	Short-epic	
Shree Ganesh Chalisa (श्री गणेश चालिसा)				
Vaidehi (वैदेही महाकाव्य)	2007	Maiyadevi Shrestha, Kathmandu	Epic	
Dakshinkali Stotram (दक्षिणकाली स्तोत्रम्)				
Matrimahima (मातृमहिमा)	2009	Somnath Arjyal, Kathmandu	Short-epic	
Durwaseshwar (दुर्वाशेश्वर)				
Kapildham (कपिलधाम)	2018	Kapil Arogya Mandir, Kapildham	Novel	
Shanta Kunja (शान्ता कुञ्ज)	2014	ShantaKunja, Kathmandu	Novel	
Sanskrit Nepali English Tadvava Shabdakosh (संस्कृत नेपाली अंग्रेजी तदभव शब्दकोश:)			Dictionary	
Panini (पाणिनी उपन्यास)	2015	Danphe Prakashan, Kathmandu	Novel	
Sanskrit - Urdu Nepali Hindi English Tadvava Shabdakosh (संस्कृत - उर्दु नेपाली हिन्दी अंग्रेजी तदभव शब्दकोश:)	2015	Himalaya Book Stall, Kathmandu	Dictionary	
Sanskrit English Nepali Sahaj Shabdakosh (संस्कृत अंग्रेजी नेपाली सहज शब्दकोश:)	2013	Nepāla Sāhitya Prakāśana Kendra, Kathmandu	Dictionary	
Ek Devkota Anek Aayam (एक देवकोटा अनेक आयाम)	2009	Himalaya Books Stall, Kathmandu	Biography	
Ahilya (अहिल्या)				
Kapildham Mahatmya (कपिलधाम महात्म्य)	2014	Kapil Arogya Mandir, Kapildham	Short-epic	
Madan Puraskar Vijeta - Jagdish Ghimire (मदन पुरस्कार विजेता - जगदीश घिमिरे)	2020			
Patanjali (पतञ्जलि)	2019	Shitganga Nagarpalika, Argakhachi	Novel	
Vararuchi Katyayan (वररुची कात्यायन)	2020	Lumbhini Bangmaya Pratisthan, Kapilvastu	Novel	

Sanskrit
Title	Year of first publication	First edition publisher	Notes	Ref.
Kimupaharami (किमुपहरामी)				
Sarala (सरला)				
Vyathavida (व्यथाविधा)			Elegiacs	
Shree Shankaracharya (श्री शंकराचार्य)				
Dhanyo Himawad Desha (धन्यो हिमवत देश)				
Hanumadayanam (हनुमदयानम्)				
Shree Satyanarayan Kathamritam (श्रीसत्यनारायणकथामृतम्)	2005	Himalaya Books Stall, Kathmandu	Mythology	
Atha Durga Kavacham (अथ दुर्गाकवचम्)				

Awadhi
Title	Year of first publication	First edition publisher	Notes	Ref.
Singighat (सिङ्घिघाट)	2009	Avadhi Cultural Development Committee, Nepal	Epic	

Atreya has edited books and has published articles and poems on various topics in national and international journals/newspapers.

== Awards ==
1. Mahendra Vidhyabhushana "Kha", Narayanhiti Royal Palace, Kathmandu, Nepal - 1973
2. Kavi Bharati Samabhinandanam - Kavi Bharati Parishad, Banaras Hindu University, Varanasi, India - 1982
3. Mahendra Vidhyabhushana "Ka", Narayanhiti Royal Palace, Kathmandu, Nepal - 1992
4. Samman -Mahakavi Devakota Jayanti, Lalitpur, Nepal - 1996
5. Gaddi Aarohan Rajat Mahotshav Padak - Narayanhiti Royal Palace, Kathmandu, Nepal - 1996
6. Sadaramabhinandanam - Devaghatta Vaidikadhyatmika Sewa Parishad, Kathmandu, Nepal - Sanskritvarsham 1999 - 2000
7. Dhirgha Sewa Padak - Mahendra Sanskrit University, Dang, Nepal - 1999
8. Avinandan - Kapilavastu Samaj Kathmandu, Kathmandu, Nepal -2000
9. Bhawani Bhikshu Puraskar - Kapilavastu Sahitiyika Samaj, Kapilavastu, Nepal - 2000
10. Virendra Aishwarya Seva Padak - Narayanhiti Royal Palace, Kathmandu, Nepal
11. Rastriya Sanskrit Gaurav Samman - Kavi Ratna Krishna Prashad Ghimire Smriti Pratisthan, Kathmandu, Nepal - 2000
12. Sanskrita Shree Samman - Vishwa Hindu Ekata Parishad, Kathmandu, Nepal - 2000
13. Mahakavi Kalidash Award - Twenty Fourth International Astrological Conference, Kolkata, India - 2001
14. Banga Janani Award - Twenty Fourth International Astrological Conference, Kolkata, India - 2001
15. Jagatacharya Chandra Swami Award - Viswa Jyotish Vidhyapith, 2001
16. Prabachan Praveen Samman - Pivata Bhagwatam Rasmalayam, Kathmandu, Nepal -2002
17. Bharati Kharel Smaraka Vyakhyan Samman Ewam Puraskar - Bharati Kharel Pratisthan, Kathmandu, Nepal - 2003
18. Avhinandan - Aryal Sewa Samaj, Kathmandu, Nepal - 2003
19. Samman - Lumbini Society of Music, Arts and Literature, Kathmandu, Nepal - 2004
20. Pratibha Samman Puraskar - Shree Dadhiram Marasini Memorial Academy, Kathmandu, Nepal - 2008
21. Rudra Prashad Rijal Sanskrit Vidwat Puraskar - Rudra Prashad Rijal Smriti Puraskar Kosh, Hetauda, Nepal - 2010
22. Sanskrit Bani Bhusan Samman - 2012
23. Jyotish Hari Prashad Ghimire 'Hari Abhinav Puraskar' - 2013
24. Nepal Sanskritik Sangh 'Dilliraj Upetri Smriti Puraskar' - 2014
25. The Jayatu Sankritam Award - 2017
26. Pradesh Ratna - 2019

== See also ==
- Nepali literature
- Laxmi Prasad Devkota
- Madhav Prasad Ghimire
