= Madan Mohan Mishra =

Nepalese Humorist and Poet

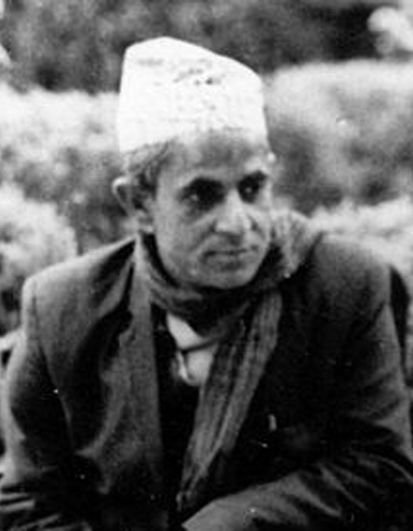
Mishra in the 1970s

Madan Mohan Mishra (Nepali: मदनमोहन मिश्र; 12 December 1931 – 4 July 2013) was a Nepalese author and humorist known for his epic poetry, satirical writings and children's songs. He wrote in Nepali, Nepal Bhasa and English.

Mishra was born to father Pandit Madhusudan and mother Maheswari Mishra in Lalitpur. He was educated in Sanskrit.

Mishra has written more than two dozen books including scholarly works on art, culture and sculpture. His Gajiguluya Mhagasay Pashupatinath (गजिगुलुया म्हगसय् पशुपतिनाथ, "Pashupatinath in the Dreams of a Marijuana Smoker"), published in 1975, is one of his most loved works in Nepal Bhasa. The first edition was confiscated by the Panchayat regime. He regularly wrote on Newar cultural-oral history for different papers, including Amalekh Weekly (since establishment in 2007 till the last issue in 2014).

He has been honored with the title of Khyali Ratna ("Jewel among Humorists") by Khyaligulu Guthi, an association of humorists.
