= Rebati Ramanananda Shrestha =

Nepalese freedom fighter and writer

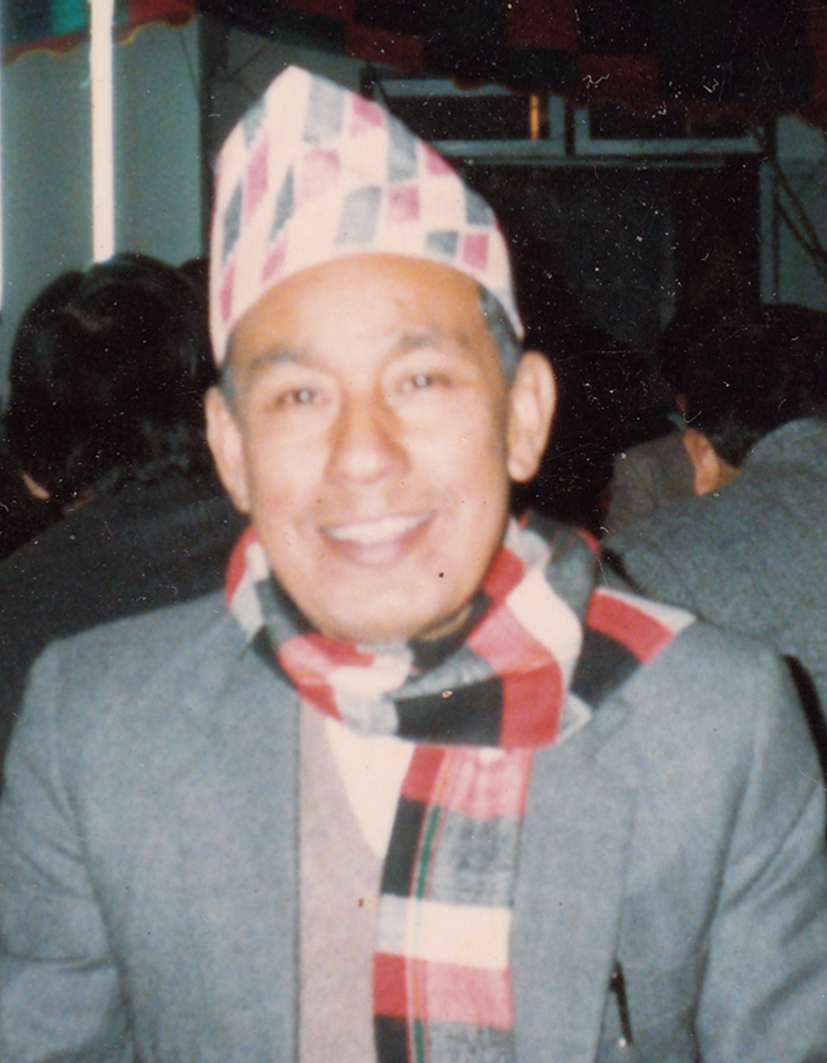
R. R. N. Syasya in 1991.

Rebati Ramanananda Shrestha (Nepali: रेबतिरमणानन्द श्रेष्ठ) (1932–2002) was a Nepalese freedom fighter, journalist and Nepal Bhasa author. He also wrote under the pen name R. R. N. Syasya (रे. रे. न. स्यस्य). His works range from poems and epics to essays and short stories. He has written books on history, language, culture and religion.

== Early life ==
Shrestha (alternative names: Rebati Ramanananda Shrestha Vaidya and Revatiramanananda Sreshtha Vaidya) was born in Kathmandu to father Basudevananda and mother Chandra Maya Shrestha. He was educated at Durbar High School in Kathmandu.

== Political career ==
Shrestha joined the underground movement against the Rana dynasty in 1948 while a student at Durbar High. In 1949, he formed an underground organization named Suhrid Mandal to carry on the struggle for democracy in Nepal. The group disbanded as the authorities were beginning to close in on it.

After finishing the School Leaving Certificate (SLC) exams in 1949, Shrestha became general secretary of Rana Bidrohi Mandal ("Anti-Rana Organization") and continued to work in the democracy movement. He gave up active politics and turned to writing and serving Nepal Bhasa following the overthrow of the Rana regime and establishment of democracy in 1951.

== Writing career ==
Shrestha enrolled in Nepal National College in 1954. His first publication was Malakha (meaning "Dragon"), a collection of poems, which came out in 1955. In 1956, while a student at Tri-Chandra College, he helped establish Nepal Bhasa Sahitya Pala, an organization of students, with the objective of conducting literary activities in Nepal Bhasa.

Shrestha has served as an editor of Nepal Bhasa literary magazines Thaunkanhe and Nepal. He was an executive member of the Nepal Bhasa Academy.

== Publications ==
Among his notable works are:

- Malakha ("Dragon"), a collection of poems (1955)
- Kapan ("Rainbow"), a collection of short stories (1956)
- Uphoswan ("Blue Lotus"), story (1956)
- Pracina Nepalaya juyivankham ("History of Ancient Nepal"), history (1991)
- Ulah ("Meteor"), a collection of poems (1993)
- Newah, a cultural history (2001)
