= List of Nepali-language poets =

This is a list of poets who have written in the Nepali language:

== A ==
- Abhi Subedi (born, 1945) – poet, essayist, critic, columnist and playwright
- Agam Singh Giri (1927–1971) – poet, lyricist
- Ali Miya (1919–2006) – folk poet
- Ashesh Malla (born, 1954) – poet, playwright and theater person

== B ==
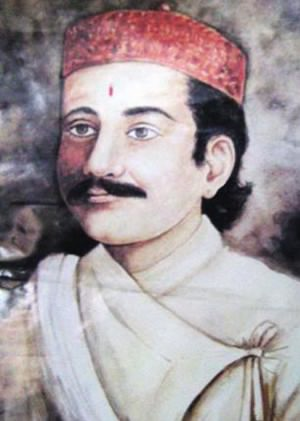
The first–ever poet Bhanubhakta Acharya

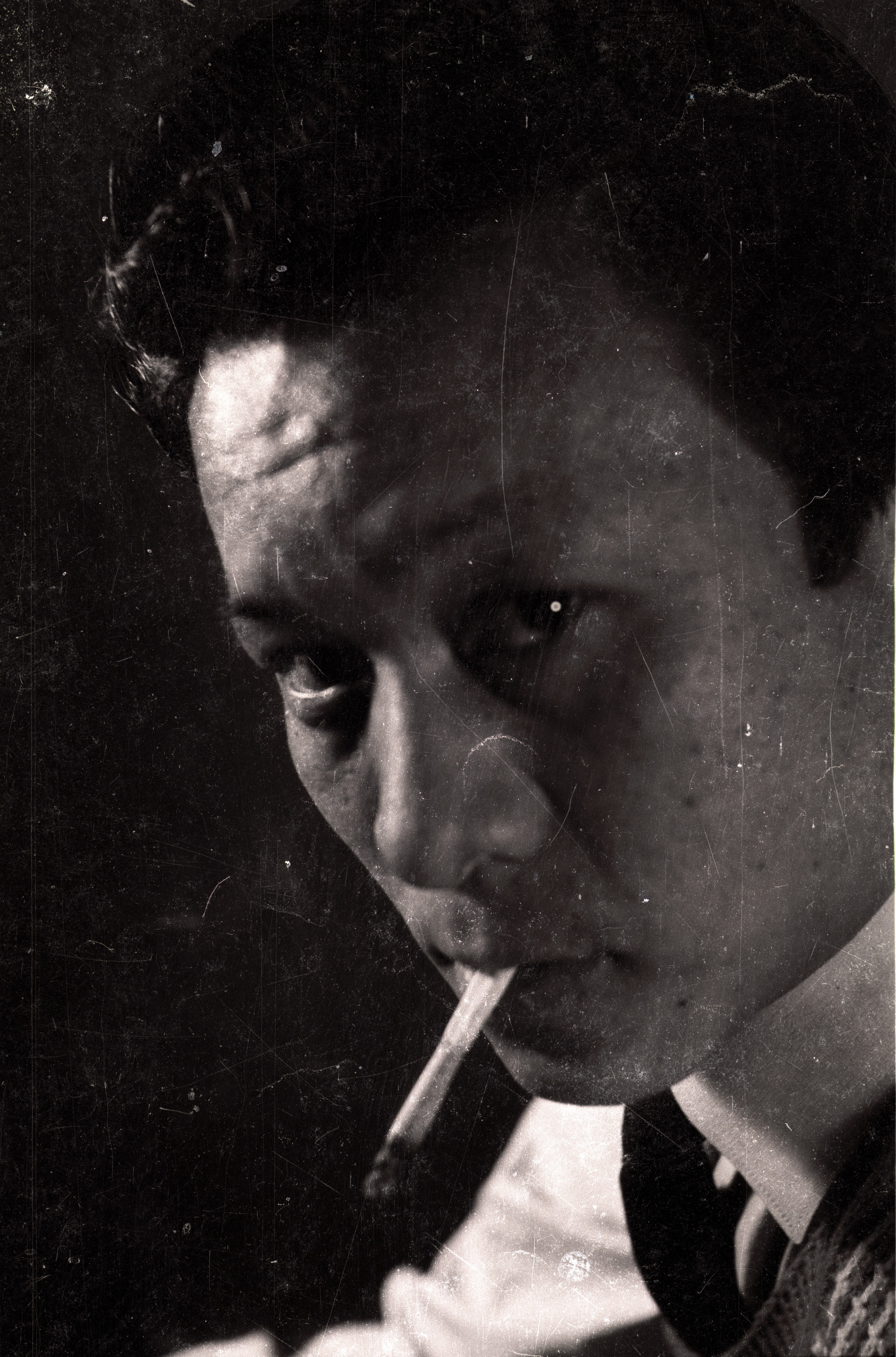
Bhupi Sherchan

- Banira Giri (1946–2021) – poet
- Bhanubhakta Acharya (1814–1868) – poet and translator
- Bhim Nidhi Tiwari (1911–1973) – poet
- Bhola Rijal – poet, doctor
- Bhupal Rai – poet
- Bhupi Sherchan (1937–1990) – poet
- Bhuwan Dhungana – poet and storywriter
- Bidhyanath Pokhrel (1918 – 1994) - poet and politician
- Bimala Tumkhewa – poet and journalist
- Bijaya Malla – (1925 – 1999) poet, novelist and playwright
- Buddha Sayami (1944–2016) – poet

== C ==
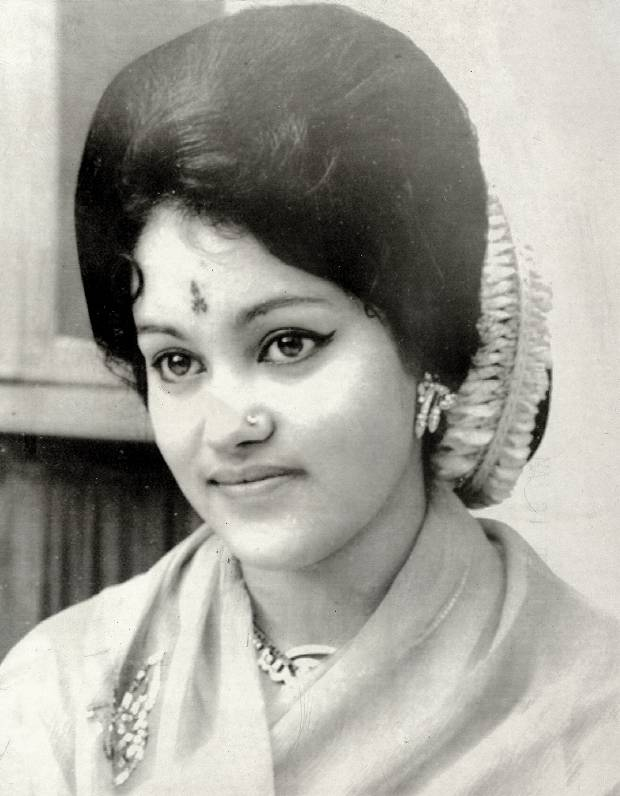
Chadani Shah (nom de plume of Queen Aishwarya)

- Chakrapani Chalise (1883–1958) – poet, writer of national anthem of Kingdom of Nepal.
- Chandani Shah (1949–2001) – poet, queen of Nepal
- Chandra Gurung - poet
- Chittadhar Hridaya (1906–1982) – poet

== D ==
- Dharanidhar Koirala – (1893–1980) – poet
- Dharmaraj Thapa
- Dharma Ratna Yami (1915–1975)
- Dharmendra Bikram Nembang (born 1976) – poet
- Dharmachari Guruma (1898–1978)
- Dhruba Chandra Gautam
- Dibya Khaling (1952–2006) – lyricist
- Dinesh Subba (born 1962)
- Durga Lal Shrestha (born 1935) – poet

== G ==
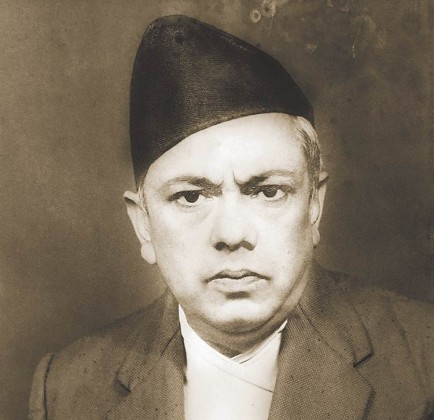
Poet Gopal Prasad Rimal

- G. Shah, (born 1947)
- Gadul Singh Lama, (born 1939)
- Ganesh Lal Shrestha, (1911–1985) – poet
- Geeta Tripathee, (1972) – poet, lyricist and literary critic
- Girija Prasad Joshi, (1939–1987) – poet
- Gopal Prasad Rimal, (1918–1973) – poet
- Gopal Singh Nepali, (1911–1963)– poet
- Gyandil Das, (1821–1883)– poet

== H ==
- Hangyug Agyat (born, 1978) – poet
- Hari Bhakta Katuwal (1935–1980)
- Hari Prasad Gorkha Rai (1914–2005)

== I ==
- Ishwor Ballav (1937–2008) – poet

== J ==
- Jhamak Ghimire – autobiographer

== K ==
- Kamala Sankrityayan (1920–2009)
- Kedar Gurung, (born 1948) - poet, writer
- Kedar Man Vyathit – poet (1914–1998)
- Komalnath Adhikari
- Krishna Bhooshan Bal (1948–2012) – poet
- Krishnahari Baral (born, 1954) – poet and critic
- Kshetra Pratap Adhikary (1943–2014) – poet
- Kul Bahadur KC (1946–2013) poet, laureate
- Kumar Nagarkoti, poet, writer

== L ==
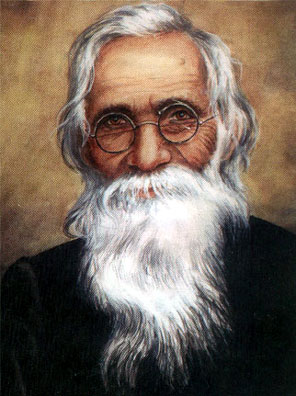
Kavi Siromani Lekhnath Paudyal

- Lakshmi Prasad Devkota (1909–1959) – poet, playwright and essayist
- Lekhnath Paudyal (1885–1966) – poet

== M ==
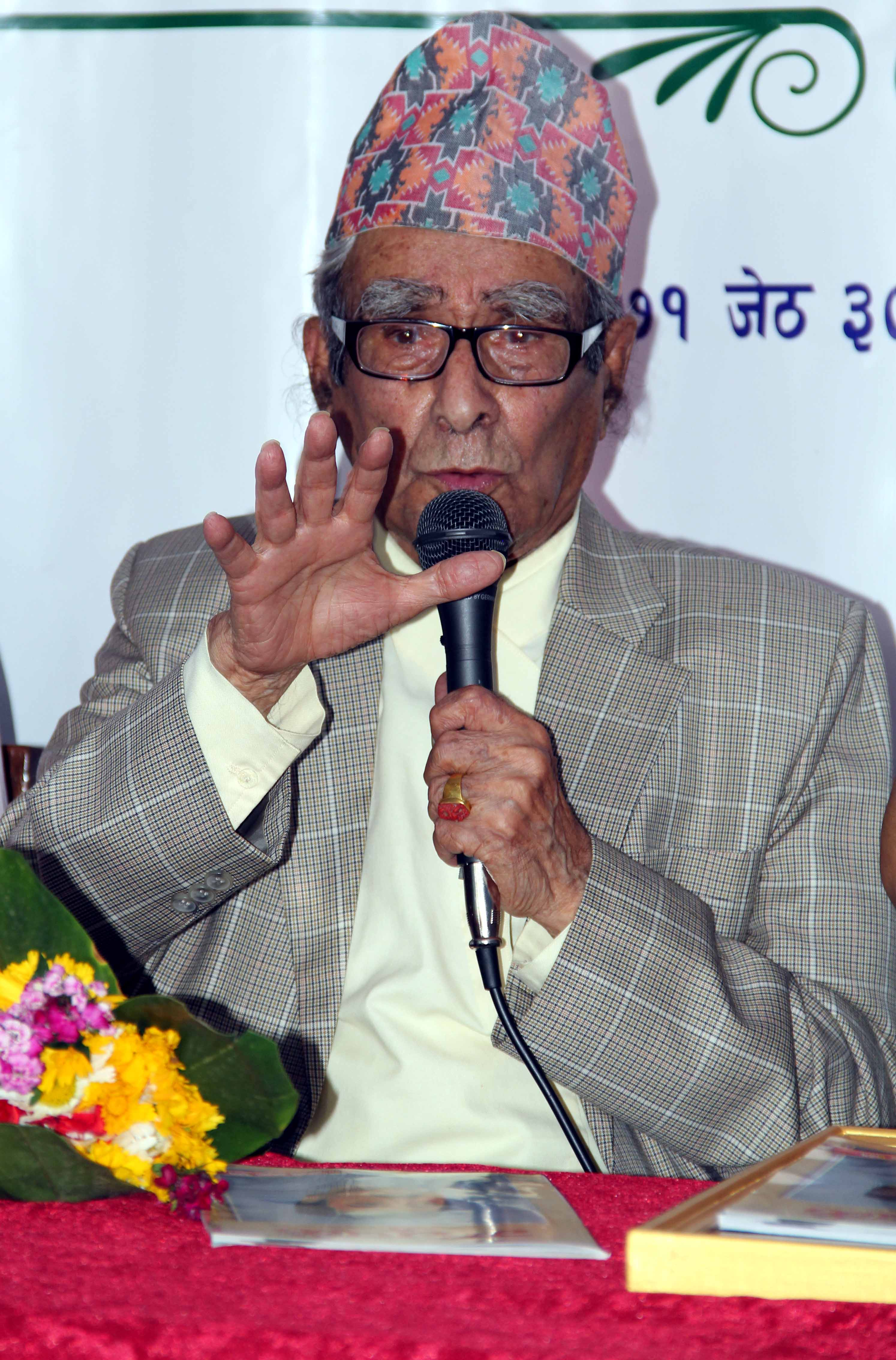
Rastra Kavi Madhav Prasad Ghimire

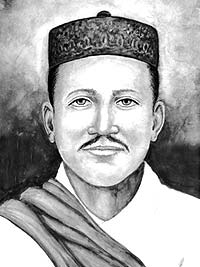
Yuva Kavi Motiram Bhatta

- Madan Mohan Mishra (1931–2013) – poet
- Madhav Prasad Ghimire (1919–2020) – poet
- Mahananda Sapkota (1896–1977) – poet and linguist
- Mahendra of Nepal (1920–1972) – poet and King of Nepal
- Motiram Bhatta (1866–1896) – poet and ghazalist
- Mukunda Sharan Upadhyaya (born 1940) – poet

== N ==
- Naba Raj Lamsal – (born 1969)
- Nara Nath Acharya (1906–1988)
- Neelam Karki Niharika – poet and writer
- Nanda Hangkhim (born 1944)
- Neer Shah (born 1951)

== P ==
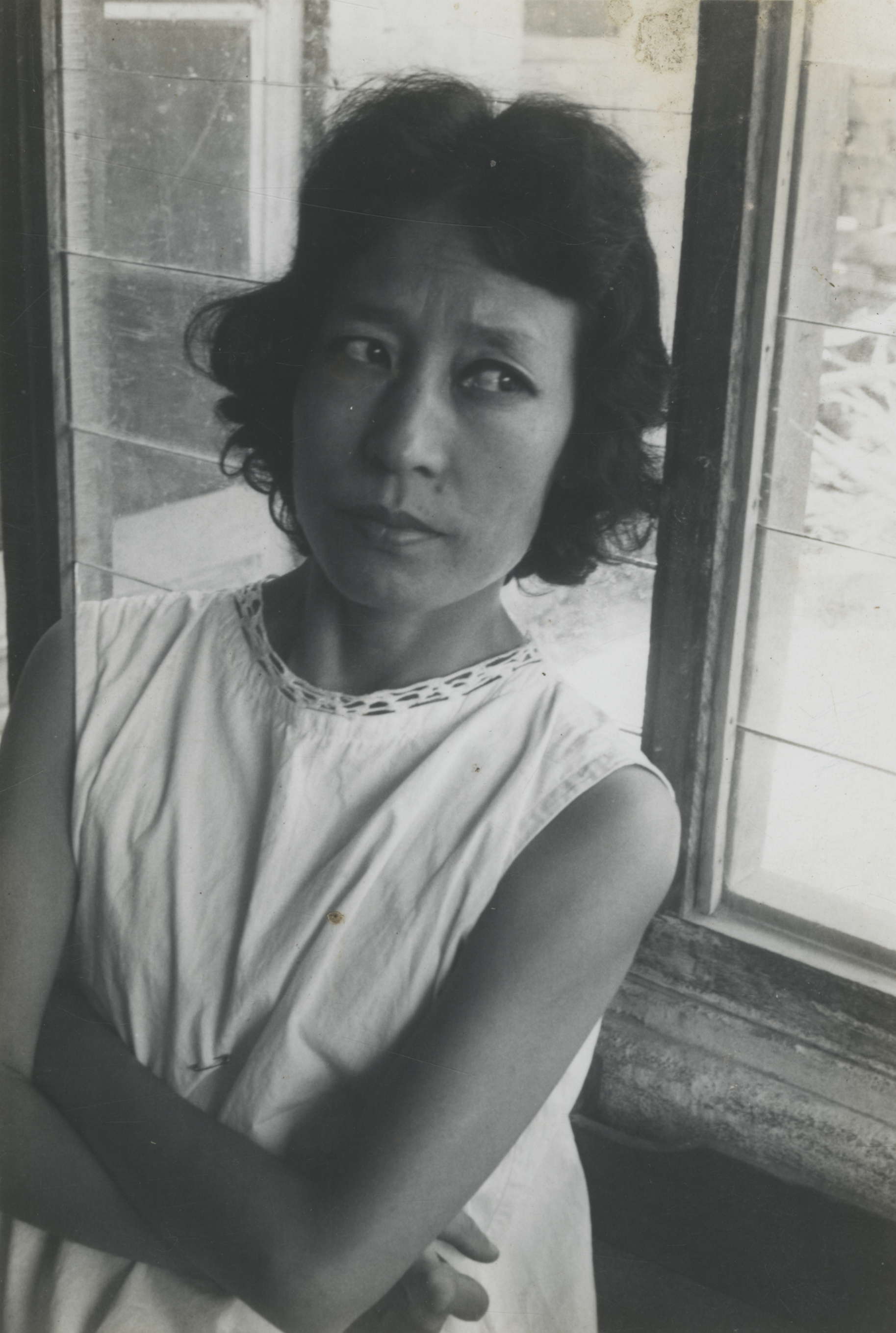
Parijat

- Parijat (1937–1993) – poet and novelist
- Phatte Bahadur Singh (1902–1983) – poet
- Pawan Chamling (born 1950) – poet
- Prema Shah – (1945–2017) poet, novelist and short–story writer

== R ==
- Rajendra Bhandari (born 1956)
- Ramesh Kshitij (born 1969) – poet
- Ram Man Trishit (1941–2011)

== S ==
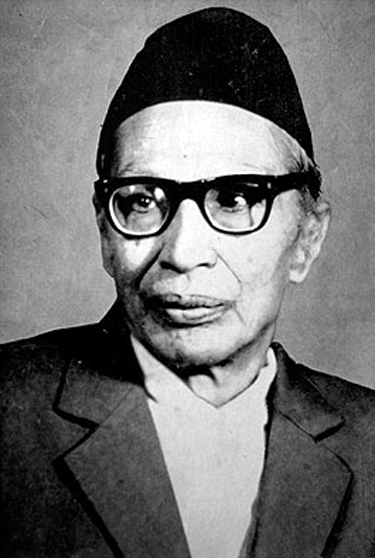
Poet Siddhicharan Shrestha

- Santosh Lamichhane (born 1983) – poet
- Sanu Sharma - novelist, short story writer, poet, lyricist
- Saraswati Pratikshya – poet, novelist
- Sarita Tiwari (born 1980) – poet, columnist
- Saru Bhakta – poet, novelist
- Shrawan Mukarung – poet
- Siddhicharan Shrestha (1912–1992) – poet
- Siddhidas Mahaju – poet
- Sulochana Manandhar (born 1955) – poet, columnist and activist
- Suman Pokhrel (born 1967) – poet, lyricist, translator and artist
- Swapnil Smriti (born 1981) – poet

== T ==
- Tulsiram Sharma Kashyap
- Toya Gurung – poet
- Tulsi Ghimire – poet
- Tulsi Diwasa– poet, folklorist

== U ==
- Usha Sherchan (born 1955) – poet, lyricist and story writer
- Upendra Subba (born 1971) – poet and story writer

== V ==
- Vishnu Raj Atreya (born 1944) – poet and writer

== Y ==
- Yogmaya Neupane (1867–1941) – poet
- Yuddha Prasad Mishra (1964–2047 BS) – poet
- Yuyutsu Sharma (born 1960) – poet

Top of page
