= List of Nepalese poets =

This list of Nepalese poets consists of poets of Neplease ethnic, cultural or religious ancestry either born in Nepal or emigrated to Nepal from other regions of the world.

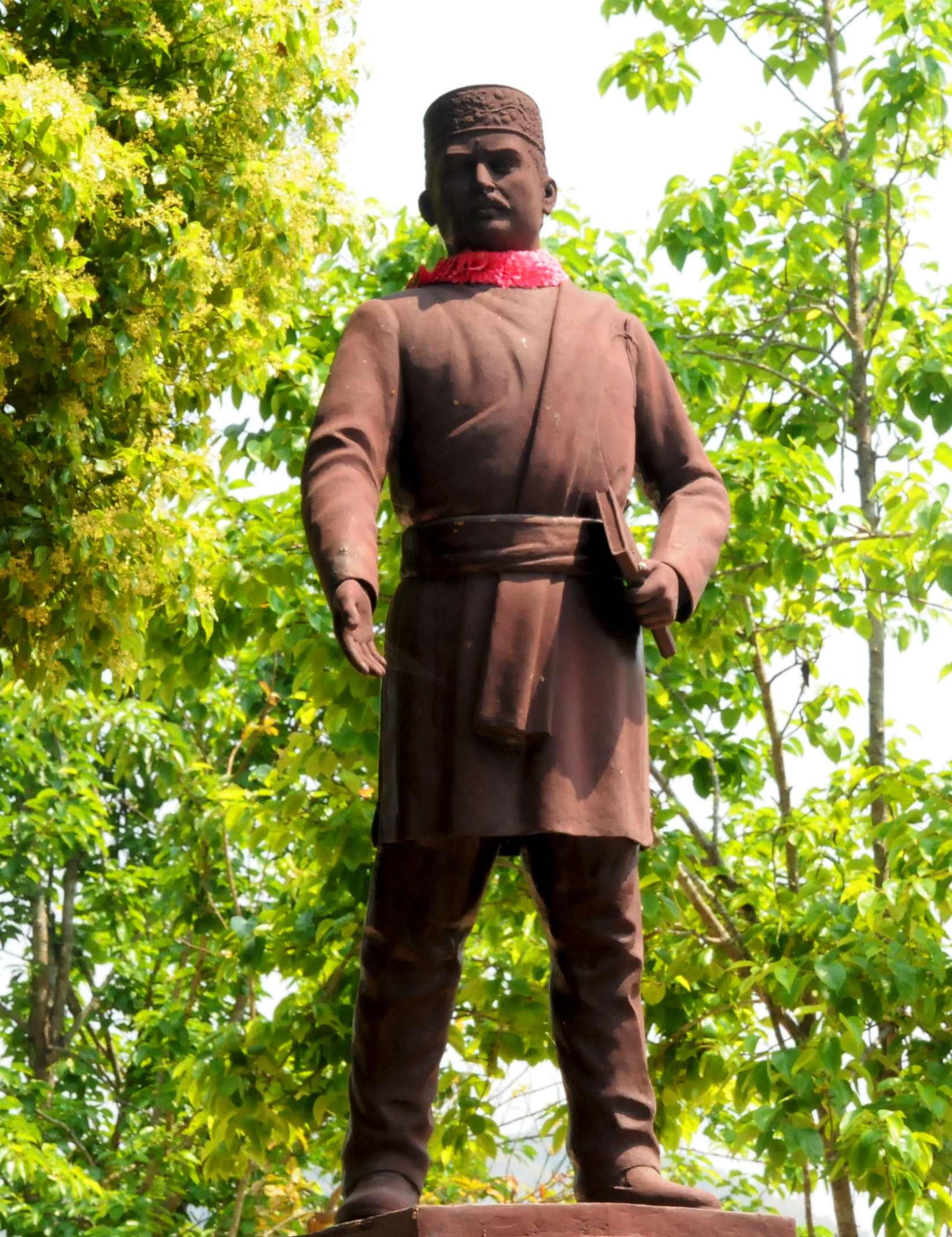
Statue of poet Bhanubhakta Acharya

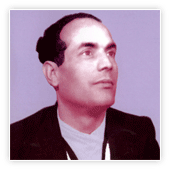
Poet Laxmi Prasad Devkota

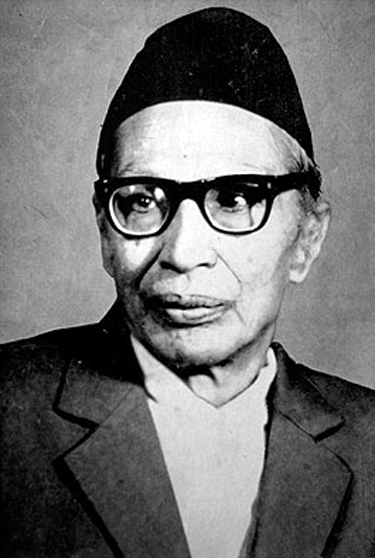
Poet Siddhicharan Shrestha

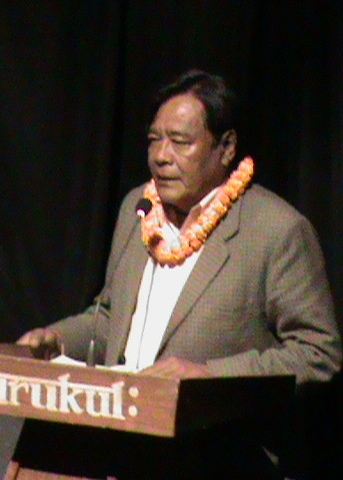
Poet Krishna Bhusan Bal

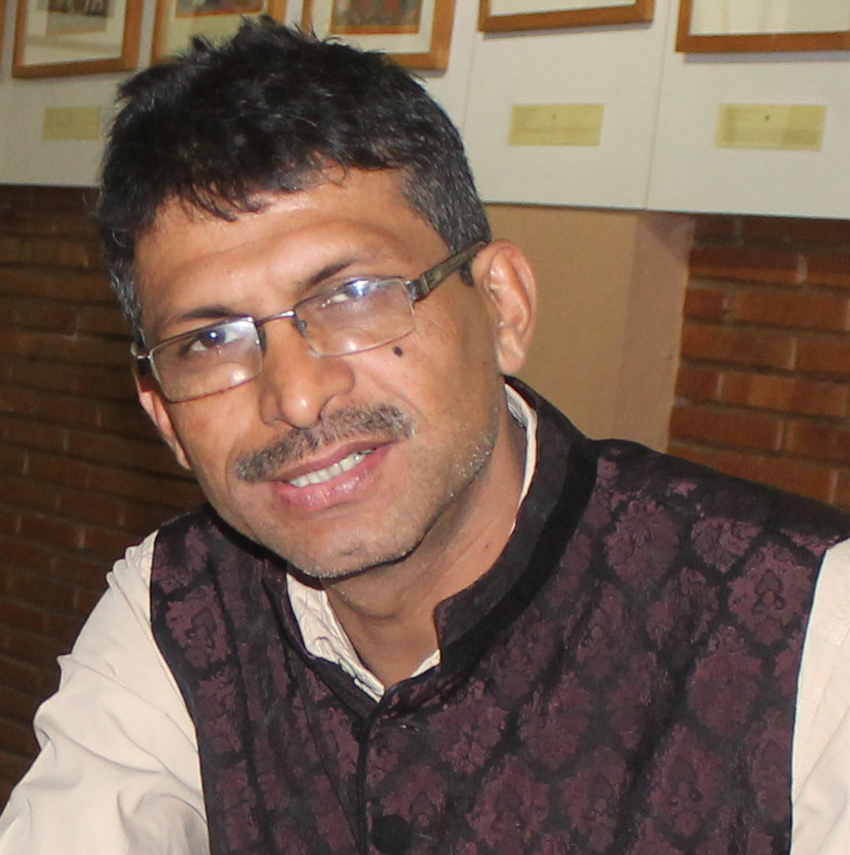
Poet, translator, playwright and artist Suman Pokhrel

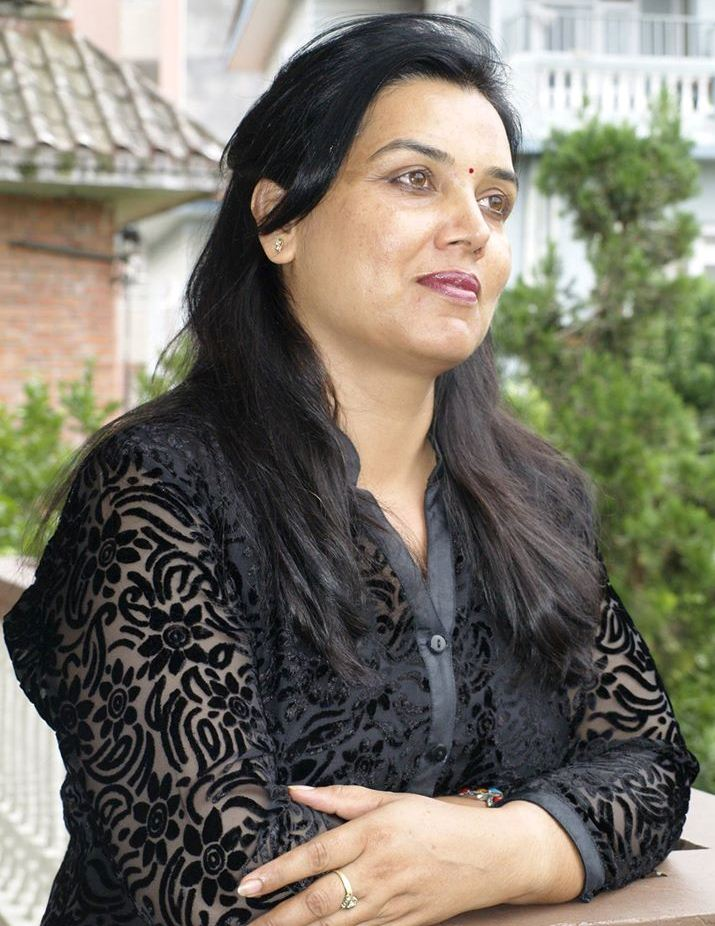
Poet, lyricist and literary critic Geeta Tripathee

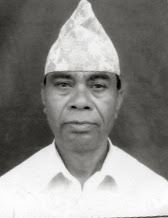
A black and white photo of Poet Kul Bahadur KC

== Nepali ==
- Abhi Subedi – (born 1945) – poet, essayist, critic, columnist and playwright
- Amber Gurung – (1938–2016) – poet and musician, composer of the current national anthem
- Ashesh Malla – (born 1954) – poet, playwright and theater person
- Bhanubhakta Acharya – (1814–1868) – poet and translator, first translation of Ramayana from Sanskrit, honored with the title of Adikavi (The First Poet)
- Banira Giri – (1946–2021) – poet
- Bhim Nidhi Tiwari – (1911–1973) – poet
- Bhupi Sherchan – (1937–1990) – poet
- Bidhyanath Pokhrel – (1918–1994) – poet and politician
- Bimala Tumkhewa – (born 1978) – poet
- Bhuwan Dhungana – (born 1947) – poet and storywriter
- Chandani Shah – (1949–2001) – poet, queen of Nepal
- Dharanidhar Koirala – (1893–1980) – poet
- Dharma Ratna Yami – (1915–1975)
- Dharmachari Guruma – (1898–1978)
- Geeta Tripathee – (1972) – poet, lyricist and literary critic
- Girija Prasad Joshi – (1939–1987) – poet
- Gokul Joshi – (1987–2018 BS)
- Gopal Prasad Rimal – (1918–1973) – poet and playwright
- Gopal Yonzon – (1943–1997) – songwriter
- Gyandil Das – (1821–1883) – poet
- Hangyug Agyat – (born 1978) – poet
- Ishwor Ballav– (1937–2008) – poet
- Janak Prasad Humagain – (1937–2006) – poet
- Kedar Man Vyathit – poet (1914–1998)
- Krishna Bhooshan Bal – (1948–2012) – poet
- Krishnahari Baral – (born 1954) – poet and critic
- Kshetra Pratap Adhikary – (1943–2014) – poet
- Kul Bahadur KC – (1946–2013) – poet, laureate
- Lakshmi Prasad Devkota – (1909–1959) – poet, playwright and essayist
- Lekhnath Paudyal – (1885–1966) – poet, founding Father of twentieth–century Nepali poetry
- Madan Mohan Mishra – (1931–2013) – poet
- Madhav Prasad Ghimire – (1919–2020) – poet
- Mahananda Sapkota – (1896–1977) – poet and linguist
- Motiram Bhatta – (1866–1896) – poet and ghazalist
- Mukunda Sharan Upadhyaya – (born 1940) – poet
- Naba Raj Lamsal – (born 1969) – poet, radio journalist, and government official
- Nara Nath Acharya – (1906–1988)
- Neer Shah – (born 1951)
- Parijat – (1937–1993) – Nepali novelist, poet. First woman to win Madan Puraskar
- Phatte Bahadur Singh – (1902–1983) – poet, jailed for life for publishing a volume of poetry, before being released four years later
- Prema Shah – (1945–2017) – poet, novelist and short–story writer
- Ramesh Kshitij – (born 1969) – poet
- Rudra Raj Pande – (1901–1987) – educator, poet, novelist
- Sanu Sharma – novelist, short story writer, poet, lyricist
- Saraswati Pratikshya – poet, novelist
- Sarita Tiwari (born 1980) – poet, columnist
- Saru Bhakta – (born 20 August 1955) – poet, novelist
- Shrawan Mukarung – (born 1968) – poet and songwriter
- Siddhicharan Shrestha – (1912–1992) – poet and dissident
- Sulochana Manandhar (born 1955) – poet, columnist and activist
- Suman Pokhrel – (born 1967) – poet, lyricist, translator and artist
- Toya Gurung – poet and member of the Nepal Academy
- Tulsi Diwasa – poet and folklorist
- Upendra Subba – (born 1971) – poet
- Vishnu Raj Atreya – (born 1944) – poet and scholar
- Yogmaya Neupane – (1867–1941) – poet and women's rights pioneer
- Yuddha Prasad Mishra (1964–2047 BS)
- Yuyutsu Sharma – (born 1960) – poet
- Ram Chandra Paudel ( Alapot, Kathmandu) (born 1938) (title..Aashu) Poet

== Nepal Bhasha ==
- Buddha Sayami – (1944–2016) – poet and member of Parliament
- Phatte Bahadur Singh – (1902–1983) – poet
- Ganesh Lal Shrestha – (1911–1985) – poet
- Girija Prasad Joshi – (1939–1987) – poet, playwright and novelist
- Madan Mohan Mishra – (1931–2013) – poet
- Moti Laxmi Upasika – (1909–1997)
- Rebati Ramanananda Shrestha – (1932–2002) – freedom fighter, journalist and author
- Siddhicharan Shrestha – (1912–1992) – poet and dissident
- Siddhidas Mahaju – (1867–1929) – poet
- Sulochana Manandhar – (born 1955) – poet, columnist and activist

== English ==
- Greta Rana – (1942–2023) – poet, writer, wordsmith.
- Abhi Subedi – (born 1945) – poet, essayist, critic, columnist and playwright
- Rabi Thapa – poet and editor
- Suman Pokhrel – (born 1967) – poet, lyricist, translator and artist
- Yuyutsu Sharma – (born 1960) – poet
- Janak Sapkota – (born 1987) – poet, haiku poet
- Sangita Swechcha – poet, writer

== Hindi ==
- Sitaram Agrahari – (born 1957) – poet and journalist

== Chinese ==
- Sulochana Manandhar – (born 1955) – poet, columnist and activist

== See also ==
- List of Nepali poets
- List of Indian poets
