= Nepali literature =

Literature of Nepali language

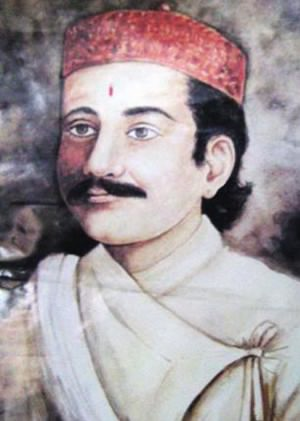
First-ever Nepali language poet Bhanubhakta Acharya

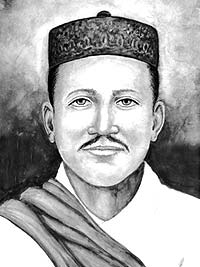
Poet Motiram Bhatta

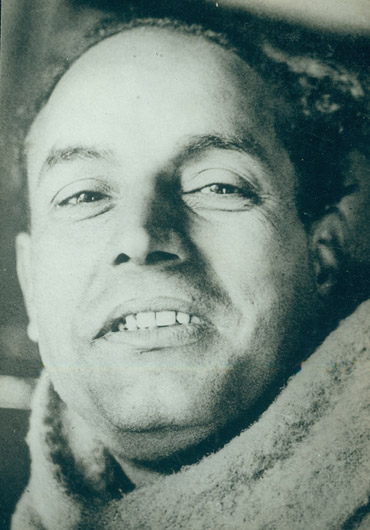
Mahakavi Laxmi Prasad Devkota

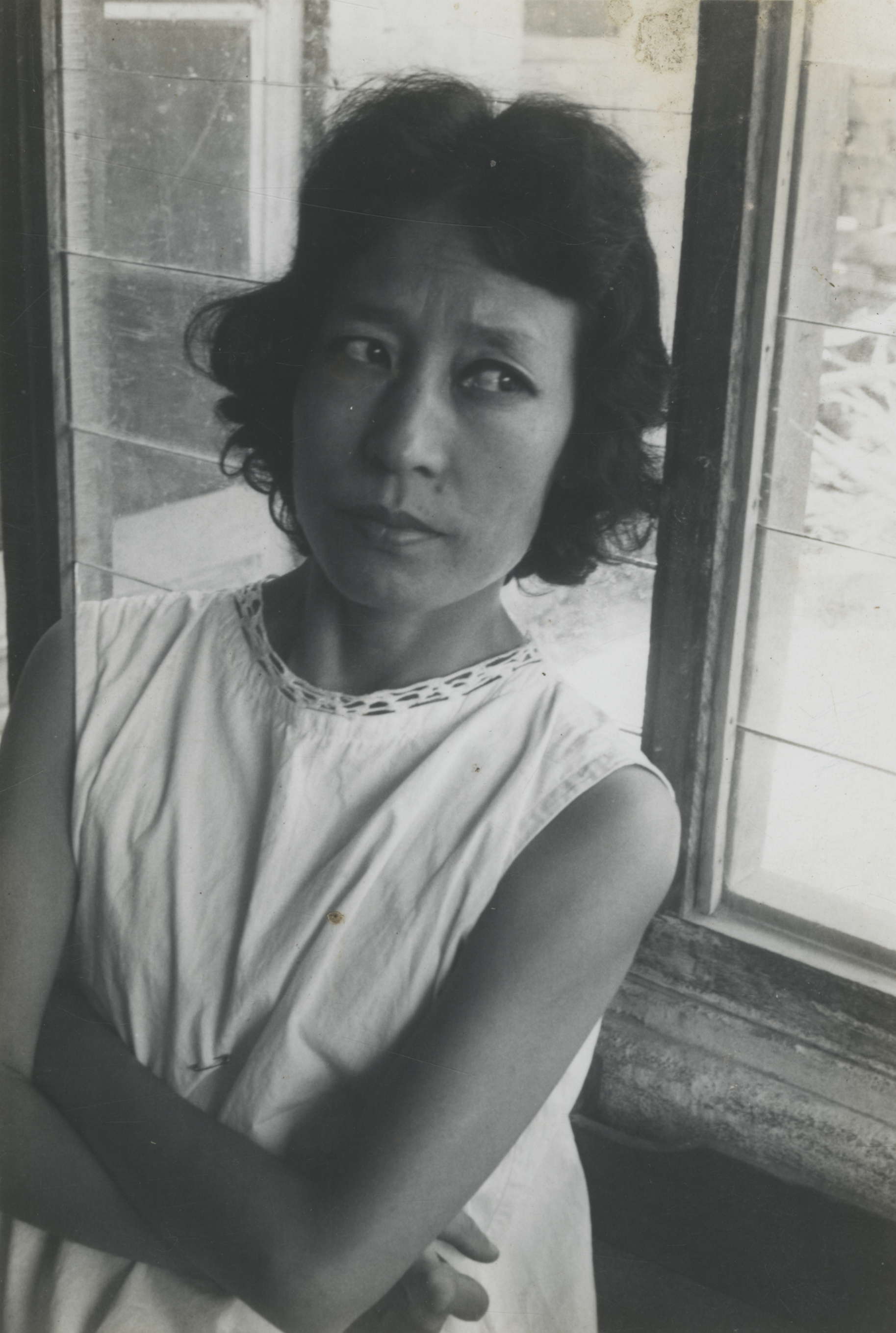
Parijat

Nepali literature (Nepali: नेपाली साहित्य) refers to literature written in the Nepali language. The Nepali language has been the national language of Nepal since 1958.

Nepali evolved from Sanskrit and it is difficult to exactly date the history of Nepali language literature since most of the early scholars wrote in Sanskrit. It is, however, possible to roughly divide Nepali literature into five periods.

== Pre-Bhanubhakta era ==
It is thought that Nepali literature had existed in verbal folklore for hundreds of years; however, manuscripts are difficult to come across. Among the earliest examples of the Nepali language are inscriptions in stone and copper plates, such as the stone inscription at Dullu, dated to the late 14th century AD. Nonetheless, a handful of literary works written in Nepali have been uncovered from before Bhanubhakta's time, such as short stories, poems, and travelogues, the earliest of which is a translation of a Sanskrit text called Bhaswati translated around 1400 AD. Additionally, many religious texts were also written in Nepali, such as Shree Swosthani Brata Katha, which was a holy book written in Newari and expanded through Nepali translations, based on stories from the Skanda Purana. Most writing was done in Sanskrit, and because it was a language accessible exclusively to high-caste Brahmins at the time, common Nepali people were not usually involved in literature, hence the underrepresentation of original Nepali literary works. A few scholars have argued that poet Suwananda Daas was the first literary figure in the history of modern Nepal. A contemporary of Bhanubhakta who represented Nirgun Bhakti Dhara (attribute-less devotional stream), Saint Gyandil Das was a poet working in Nepali and composed Udayalahari.

== Bhanubhakta era ==
Nepali speakers honor Bhanubhakta as the "Adikavi (Nepali: आदिकवि)" (literally meaning 'first poet') of the Nepali language. Bhanubhakta's most important contribution to Nepali literature is his translation of the holy Ramayana into the Nepali language. He transcribed Ramayana in metric form, using the same form as Sanskrit scholars. Besides translating the Ramayana, Bhanubhakta also wrote original poems on a diverse range of subjects: from advocacy of family morals to satires of bureaucracy and the poor conditions of prisoners.

== Early 20th century ==
This era is also known s Motiram Bhatta era, after the poet Motiram Bhatta. Motiram Bhatta (1923–1953 BS or 1866–1896 CE) revived the legacy of Bhanubhakta and publicized the contributions of the latter. Motiram played such a fundamental role in the legacy of Bhanubhakta that some allege that Bhanubhakta was just a fabrication of Motiram's mind.

Bir Charitra by Girish Ballabh Joshi is considered to be the first Nepali novel written. It was published in 1903. However, the publication of the novel was restricted by the Rana regime and the complete edition of the novel was published in 1965. The manuscript of the novel was shared among the readers. Roopmati by Rudra Raj Pande, published in 1934, became the first most popular novel in Nepali language. Since the complete edition of Bir Chaitra was published much later, Roopmati could also be considered the first novel in Nepali language.

== 1960–1991 ==
The Pre-Revolution Era was a very prolific period for creative writing despite the lack of freedom of expression. During this period the independent magazine "Sharada" was the only printed medium available for the publication of Nepali literature. Short stories by Laxmi Prasad Devkota, Guru Prasad Mainali, Bishweshwar Prasad Koirala and Gadul Singh Lama (Sanu Lama)

Plays like the influential Muna Madan by Laxmi Prasad Devkota tell the tales of human lives: the story is about a man who leaves his wife, mother, and home to earn money in Tibet, precipitating tragedy. Other stories by Bishweshwar Prasad Koirala introduced psychology into literature, for instance through creations such as Teen Ghumti, Doshi Chashma and Narendra Dai. This period produced several prominent poets such as Laxmi Prasad Devkota, Gopal Prasad Rimal, Siddhicharan Shrestha, Bhim Nidhi Tiwari and Balkrishna Sama. Later, several poets come into light during the Panchayat regime. Indra Bahadur Rai, Parijat, Bhupi Sherchan, Madhav Prasad Ghimire, Bairagi Kainla, Banira Giri, Ishwor Ballav, Tulsi Diwasa, Kul Bahadur KC, Toya Gurung, Vishnu Raj Atreya and Krishna Bhooshan Bal can be named in this regard.

== Post-revolution era ==
Nepali language authors who have contributed significantly from the period following the democratic revolution of 1991 to the present day include Khagendra Sangraula, Ashesh Malla, Sarubhakta, Suman Pokhrel, Shrawan Mukarung, Geeta Tripathee, Sanu Sharma, Neelam Karki Niharika, Nayan Raj Pandey, Ramesh Kshitij, Narayan Wagle, Krishna Dharabasi, Yuyutsu Sharma, Buddhi Sagar, and Mahananda Poudyal among many others. These writers have contributed across various genres, enriching contemporary Nepali literature with diverse styles, themes, and perspectives. Their works reflect the evolving social, political, and cultural landscape of Nepal over the past few decades.

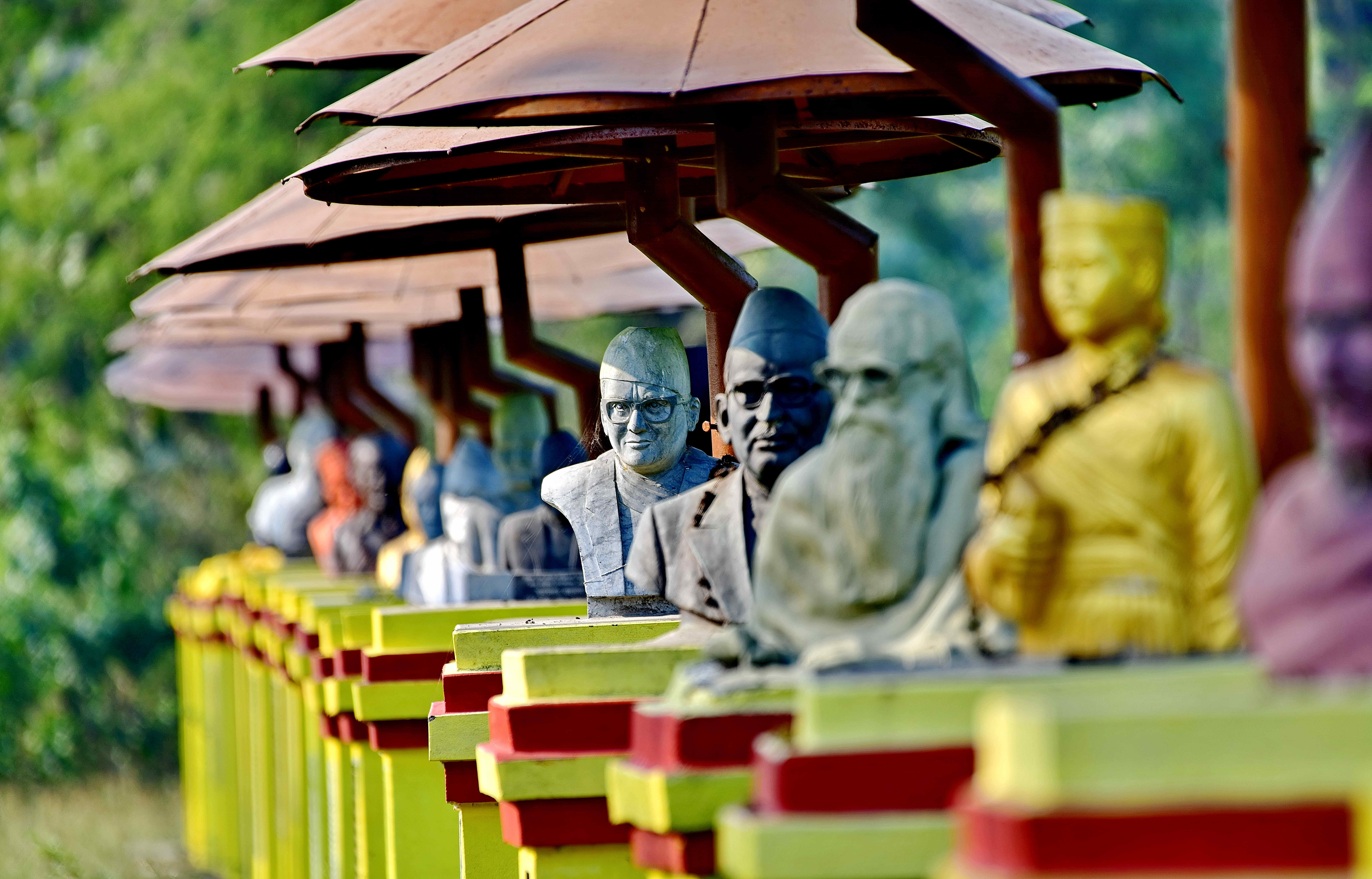
Busts of popular writer in Kapildham Sahitya Chautari, Kapilvastu

Nepali-language speakers are rapidly migrating around the globe and many books of Nepali language literature are published from different corners of the world. Diasporic literature has developed new ways of thinking and created a new branch in Nepali language literature. With the development of the Nepali diaspora around the world, the literary centrality of Kathmandu has begun to decentralize.

== See also ==
- List of Nepali language poets
- List of Nepali-language authors
- List of Nepali poets
- List of Nepali writers
- Bhutanese Nepali literature
- List of Nepali literature in English, the translated literatures
