= Moon Poudel =

Nepali writer

- मुन पौडेल
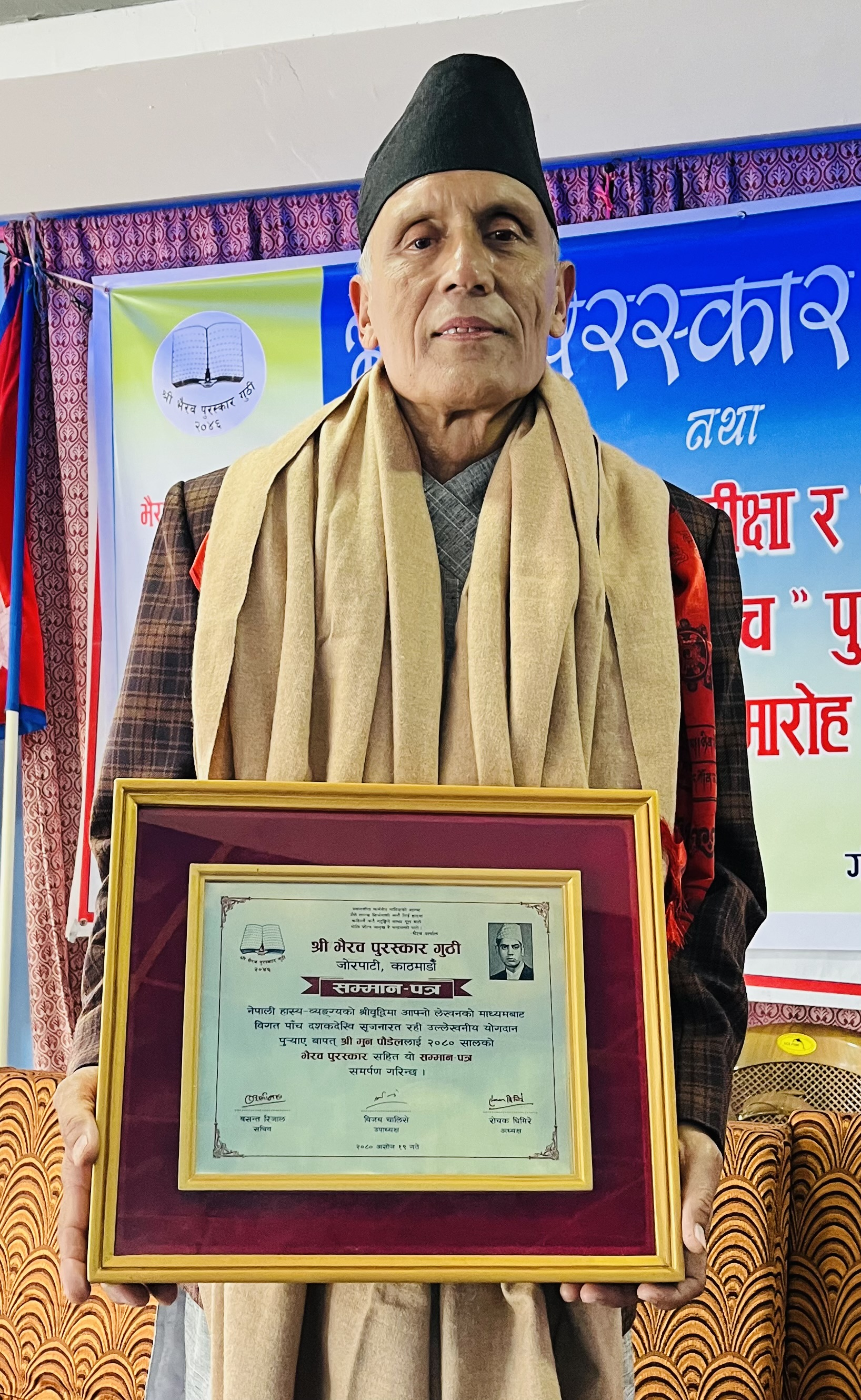
- Moon Poudel receiving the Bhairab Puraskar for 2080 BS in a function at Kathmandu, Nepal.
- Born: 2012 BS (1956 AD); Kathmandu; Nepal
- Occupation: Writer
- Writing career
- Language: Nepali
- Genres: Satire, Ghazal, Poem
- Notable awards: Bhairab Puraskar 2080 BS

Moon Kumar Sharma Poudel, also known as Moon Poudel (Nepali: मुन पौडेल) is a writer of Nepali literature. He is best known for writing satire and ghazals in Nepali language. He was honored with the Bhairab Puraskar in 2080 BS (2023 AD) by the Bhairab Puraskar Guthi for his remarkable five decades of contributions to Nepali satirical essays.

== Early life and education ==
=== Birth and family Background ===
Moon Poudel was born on Bhadra 25, 2012 BS (10 September 1955) in Thahiti, Kathmandu as the eldest son of Kamala and Nilnath Upadhyaya (Poudel). Later, his family moved to Bhagbatipur, a village in the Dhanusha district of Nepal.

=== Formal education and influences ===
He completed most of his education from Dhanusha. He obtained a bachelor's degree in Law (LLB) and master's degree in political science. His academic background in political science provided a foundation for his later career in administrative service. Growing and receiving education in Dhanusha, a region with strong Maithili cultural influences, Poudel developed proficiency in multiple languages including Nepali, Maithili, and Hindi through a combination of formal studies and regional immersion. During his educational years, he encountered key influences from Nepali literary traditions, particularly satire and the ghazal form, which shaped his writing style.

== Literary Contributions ==
He has published numerous literary articles in the forms of satire, ghazals, drama, and poems, which have appeared in various magazines and newspapers. In addition to Nepali, he has also written in Maithili and Hindi languages.

== Books ==
- Gazalotsav (गजलोत्सव) 2053 BS
- Safalta Ka Tin Mantra (सफलताका तिन मन्त्र) 2055 BS
- Buddhijibi Ra Puchhar (बुद्धिजीवी र पुच्छर) 2058 BS
- Bhusukkai (भुसुक्कै) 2080 BS (2024 AD)

== Awards ==
Bhairab Puraskar 2080
