= Krishna Bhusan Bal =

Nepalese poet

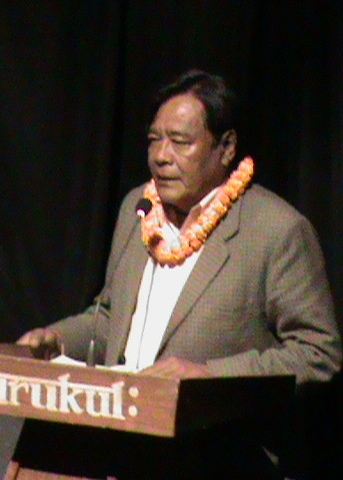
- Bal speaking during the valedictory session of Koshi Kavya Yatra
- Born: 13 March 1948; Malteni, Ilam, Nepal
- Died: 25 June 2012 (aged 64); Biratnagar, Nepal
- Education: Bachelor's degree
- Occupation: Poet
- Notable work: Bholi Baasne Bihana
- Spouse: Shobha Lama
- Children: 2

Krishna Bhusan Bal (Nepali: कृष्णभूषण बल; 13 March 1948 - 25 June 2012) was a Nepalese poet known primarily for simplifying poetry for its readers at a time when poets were inclined to grandiloquence. Carving emotions into words is considered to be one of Bal's most intricate qualities. Bal's personality is often compared to a poem, indifferent to race, caste, religion, and politics.

== Biography ==
=== Early life ===
Bal was born on 13 March 1948 at his maternal home to Hem Bal Tamang and Sharda Ghising Tamang. He was the eldest, having two sisters born after him. His father remarried after the death of his mother. Though his sisters stayed with their father, he stayed at his late mother's house as Tikaram Tamang until his graduation from elementary school.

Tikaram, although considered to be an average student by his teacher, Lagna Prasad, showed great interest in literature and extra-curricular activities. After completing his basic level education from Rabi Campus and Durga Higher Secondary School, Tikaram was schooled at Karfok Vidya Mandir by Nar Bahadur Lama. Later, Tikaram moved to Ilam Bazar, where he worked as the chief of the committee. There, he started writing and publishing poems with the name of Krishna Bhusan Bal.

=== Education and career ===
Having finished his basic level education from Ravi Bazar, Ilam, Tamang moved to Biratnagar. In the process of becoming Krishna Bhusan, Tikaram passed his SLC from Kathmandu, where he aspired to become a policeman. However, upon suggestions from some friends, he passed the Public Service Commission examinations and enrolled to get his Bachelor of Arts degree while working at Nepal Rastra Bank. Later, he started writing and publishing poems under the name of Krishna Bhusan Bal, which he considered to be his road to fame.

=== Literature ===
The Full Moon by the River Bank

Looking into the mirror
of emerald meadow of waters,
the moon has flashed a fruity chuckle.
Tickled at the gentle touch of breeze
the water spreads wavelets,
and the entire moon appears to be a neonate,
swinging in a cradle.
The waterbirds as if to jab their beaks through the moon,
fly out of sight fluttering their wings.
The trees across the river
still stand still as if to shoulder the entire era.
The lamps flickering in the houses big and small,
on either bank, are adorned like the stars.
The horizon getting narrowed gradually
has descended to stick to the hill on the bank.
The moon now crossing the yonder region of waters,
has come down to rest atop me.
I wonder from where gathered has
a flock of sheep-like clouds.
As if a furry pashmina the clouds pulled over them
the sheet of the full moon spread on the meadow of waters.
Probably the switch to turn on and off
each sparkling moment is in the hand of these clouds.

— Krishna Bhusan Bal (translated)

Tikaram moved to Ilam Bazar, where he worked as the chief of the committee. There, he started writing and publishing poems with the name of Krishna Bhusan Bal. His first poem, Ma Yuvak Hoon, was published in the Saugat daily based in Ilam.

Bal had to bear torture from his father and his stepmother after his mother died when he was barely 5; thereby, adding to his struggles. At the age of 17, Bhushan moved to Kathmandu. Three years later, he moved to Biratnagar where he stayed for the rest of his life.

The publishing of Sadak Kavita Kranti in 1979 and Bholi Baasne Bihana in 1984 established his status as a revolutionary poet of the Nepali language. Bal, along with Gopal Prasad Rimal and Bairagi Kainla, was considered to be one of the most revolutionary Nepalese poets by renowned critic Krishna Chandra Singh Pradhan.

Bal's Bisaun Bhanau Sakdina, published on 23 June 2012, is considered to be his last work.

=== Personal life ===
Bal fathered a son and a daughter with his wife, Shobha Lama, whom he met when he worked at Nepal Rastra Bank.

=== Death ===
Bal was taken to the hospital when he was found unconscious in the shower after going for a morning walk. Bal, who was discharged from Neuro Hospital, Biratnagar just four days before the incident, was pronounced dead due to intracerebral hemorrhage on June 25, 2012 at 7:25 pm.

== Styles and themes ==
Krishna Bhusan Bal is known for presenting current events and different stages of life in simple yet euphonious words. Reality and contemporaneity are included in the list of strengths of his poems.

Bal's career, which started in the seventies, spanned a little over three decades. Amiable and compassionate Bal's works, Dajyu, Timro Haat Chahinchha and Bholi Baasne Bihana, have been acclaimed critically by literary critics and writers alike. Many litterateurs have drawn inspiration from Bal and claimed that he will be remembered for generations to come. He has, in fact, been compared to Langston Hughes and Martin Luther King Jr. by SAARC Literary Award winner Suman Pokhrel.

== Published works ==
=== Poetry collections ===
| Year | Title | Note | Reference |
|---|---|---|---|
| 1984 | Bholi Baasne Bihana | Collection of poems in Nepali | |
| 2010 | The Full Moon at the River Bank | Collection of poems in English translation | |
| 2014 | Krishna Bhusan Bal ka Baaki Rachana | Posthumous release | |

=== Epics ===
| Year | Title | Reference |
|---|---|---|
| 1976 | Dajyu, Timro Haat Chahinchha | |

=== Writings ===
| Year | Title | Note | Reference |
|---|---|---|---|
| 1988 | Sahityakar Parichaya ra Abhivyakti | Written for then Royal Nepal Academy | |

== Awards and honours ==
Bal, whose poems were first published in Sangalo, edited by litterateur Madhav Bhandari, continued writing till much later in life. For his indispensable contributions to Nepali poetry, Bal has received several awards and honours.

| Year | Honor | Presenter |
|---|---|---|
| 1983 | National Poetry Festival, 2040 | |
| 1983 | Pratibha Puraskar | Biratnagar |
| 1984 | National Poetry Festival, 2041 | |
| 1995 | Certificate of recognition | Navaranga Sahitya Pratisthan, Jhapa |
| 2000 | Rashtriya Pratibha Puraskar | |
| 2000 | Dr. Swami Prapannacharya Chaturbhuj Puraskar | |
| 2003 | Certificate of recognition | Nepal Tamang Ghedung, Purvanchal Chhetriya Samanvaya Samiti, Dharan |
| 2003 | Certificate of recognition | Sahitya Kala Sangam, Damak |
| 2003 | Certificate of recognition | Shiromani Pustakalaya Parivaar, Biratnagar |
| 2003 | Certificate of recognition | Ravi Bazar, Ilam |
| 2005 | Certificate of recognition | Eurasia Reiyukai |
| 2005 | Certificate of recognition | Madhurima |
| 2006 | Certificate of recognition | Chetana Pratibha Samrakshan Pratisthan |
| 2006 | Basundhara Manshree Puraskar | |
| 2008 | Public felicitation | Kirat Yakkha Student Union, Nepal Federation of Indigenous Nationalities, and Limbu Vidyarthi Manch, Jhapa |
| 2008 | Basu Sashi Smriti Samman | |
| 2009 | Certificate of recognition | Birat Bauddha Samaj |
| 2009 | Certificate of recognition | Tripala Rashtriya Puraskar |
| 2009 | Certificate of recognition | Shree Lunkaran Das Ganga Devi Chaudhary Academy for Arts and Literature |
| 2009 | Public felicitation | Nepal Tamang Ghedung, Urlabari |
| 2009 | Public felicitation | Devkota Pustakalaya, Biratnagar |

== Affiliated organizations ==
| SN | Organization | Post | Reference |
|---|---|---|---|
| 1 | Nepal Academy | Member | |
| 2 | Vaani Prakashan, Biratnagar | Chairperson | |
| 3 | Loktantrik Srashta Samyukta Manch | Chairperson | |
| 4 | Jeevan Smriti Pratisthan | Lifetime member | |
| 5 | Navaranga Sahitya Pratisthan | Lifetime member | |
| 6 | Vanita Prakashan | Lifetime member | |

== See also ==
- List of Nepalese poets
