= Mukunda Sharan Upadhyaya =

Nepali poet and linguist

Mukunda Sharan Upadhyaya मुकुन्दशरण उपाध्याय

Personal details
- Born: 17 April 1940 (1997 Baishak 05 BS) Hemja, Pokhara, Nepal
- Children: 3 Sons and 2 Daughters
- Occupation: Professor

Mukunda Sharan Upadhyaya (Nepali: मुकुन्द शरण उपाध्याय) is a Nepali Poet and Linguist. He was born in Hemja, Near Pokhara on April 17, 1940.

He is best known for his book Prakrit Pokhara (प्राकृत पोखरा) which won Madan Puraskar on 1964 (2021 BS). He is the author of numerous Nepali & Sanskrit books and has made important contribution to Nepali & Sanskrit language, therefore a recognized literary figure by both Nepal & India Government.

His Story 'Jhagada Ko Okhati' is famous, and a translated version of it is also taught in the school curriculum of Bangladesh.

== Early life ==
Upadhyaya was born on 17 April 1940 in Pokhara, the son of Pandit Dasharath Upadhyaya and Keshar Kumari Upadhyaya. Upadhyaya attended Shri Nimbarka Sanskrit Mahavidyalaya Vrindavan, India. He graduated with a Masters of Arts from Tribhuvan University.".

== See also ==
- Madan Puraskar
- Nepali literature
- Nepali Language
- Sanskrit Language
- List of Nepalese poets
