= Gokul Joshi =

Nepali poet (1930-1961)

Gokul Joshi (1987-2018 BS; 1930-1961 GC) (Nepali: गोकुल जोशी) was a Nepali poet and a progressive songwriter. He was born in Raipur village which lies in border of Syangja District and Tanahu District in Nepal. In Nepal, he has been entitled Jana Kabi meaning people's poet.

== Biography ==
Gokul Joshi was born as a second son of mother Manrupa and Father Harilal Pokhrel on Jestha 8, 1987 BS (May 21, 1930 GC) in Raipur Village of Tanahu District. He had 7 siblings with 3 brother and 4 sisters. His father died at the age of six and he was orphaned at the age of 13.

Due to financial hardship, he went to India in 2000 BS (1943–44 GC) and took a job of washing dishes and other household chores. In 2003 BS (1946–47 GC), he reached Kolkata and joined the Indian Army as a helper. His battalion was soon transferred to Madras, where he began to write poems. It is said that his seniors did not like his attitude, for which he received frequent warnings and punishments. He was later sacked from the army by a 'Court Marshal'. Then, he went to Mumbai where he worked as a cleaner and painter for a ship building company. While working in Mumbai, he enrolled in a school and studied up to fourth grade. In 2007 BS (1950–51 GC), the labourers of ship company organized a strike, in which, Joshi took the leadership. He was removed from the job after the incident.

After knowing that Rana regime ended in 2007 BS (1950–51 GC), Joshi returned to Kathmandu in 2008 BS (1951–52 GC). He met with leaders of the then Praja Parishad, Tanka Prasad Acharya and Ram Hari Sharma from whom he got a membership of Nepal Praja Parishad and worked for the party. In addition, he got a job of storekeeper at the construction site of Gaucharan airport. He was removed from the job after six months because of conflict with the contractors.

In 2009 BS (1952–53 GC), he met Dharma Raj Thapa and started writing poems. Joshi took membership of Communist Party and travelled to Terai to preach awareness by songs. In 2011 BS (1954–55 GC), he withdrew his membership from the Communist Party. However, he continued to travel inside Nepal. In 2013 BS (1956–57 GC), he reached Jhapa District and worked as a teacher. The people of Jhapa, donated him some money to publish his poems, titled Bancha Ra Banchna Deu (Live and Let Live).

Joshi died on 4 Asar 2018 BS (June 18, 1961) in Ghailadubba due to tuberculosis. He was cremated at Biring River by his fellow teachers and students.

== Impact ==
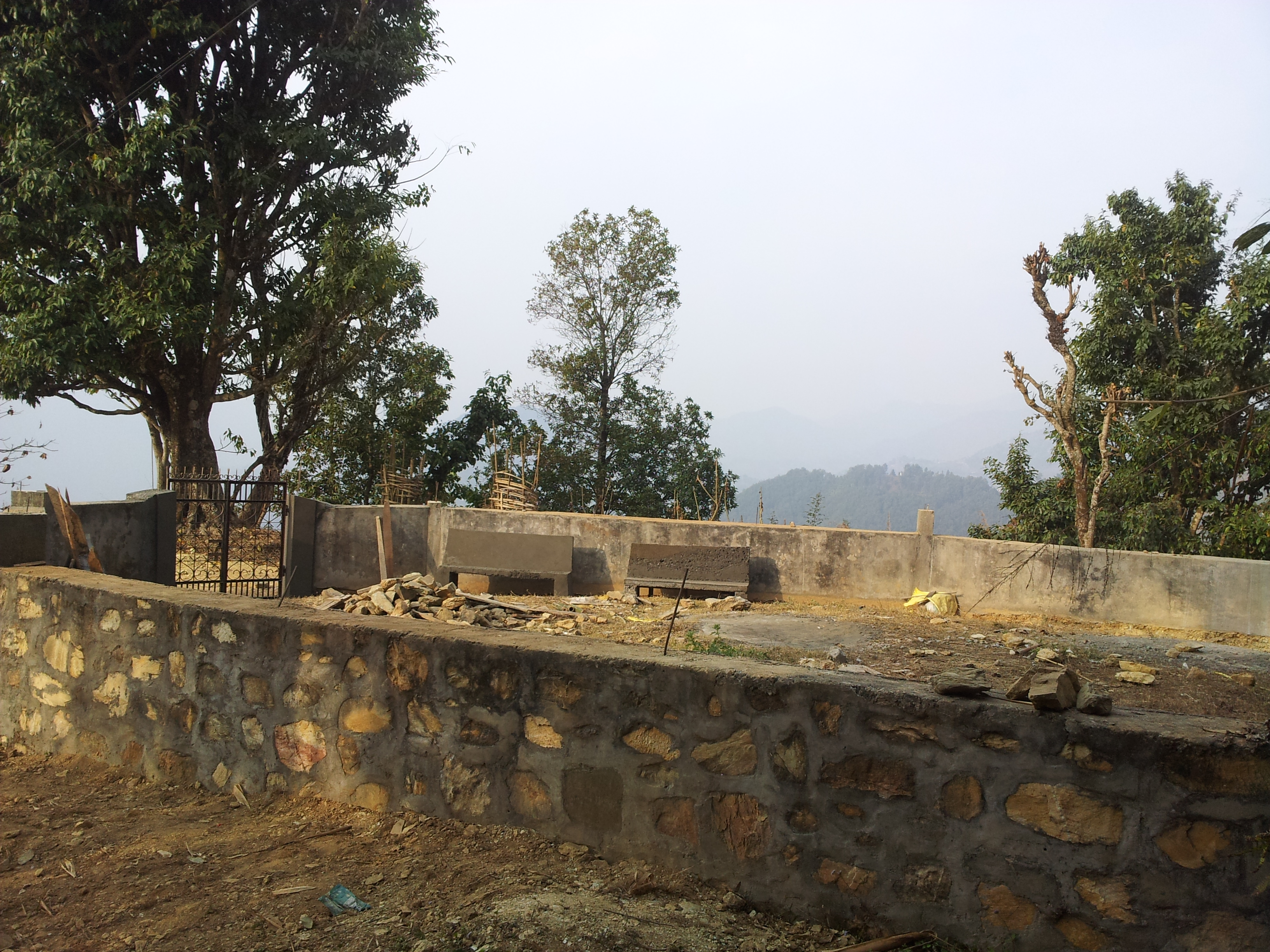
Gokul Park, Raipur

- Gokul Joshi study and research center has been established in Ghailadubba in his memory.
- A park has been named on him and a statue has been established in Tanahu district for this contribution to Nepali literature

== See also ==
- List of Nepalese poets
