= Nanda Hangkhim =

Indian Nepali writer

- Born: 11 November 1944 (age 81); Margaret's Hope Tea Estate, Darjeeling, India
- Citizenship: Indian
- Education: Darjeeling Government College
- Occupation: Poet
- Writing career
- Language: Nepali
- Notable awards: Sahitya Akademi Award (2014)

Nanda Hangkhim (Nepali: नन्द हाङ्खिम) is a writer in the Nepali language. He is from Darjeeling district, India. He is a recipient of the Sahitya Akademi Award (2014) for his collection of short stories Satta Grahan.

== Bibliography ==
- Mrtyu Divasa
- Arko Anuhāra

== See also ==
- Indra Bahadur Rai
- Agam Singh Giri
- Parijat
