= Ramesh Kshitij =

Nepali poet, lyricist and writer (born 1969)

- रमेश क्षितिज
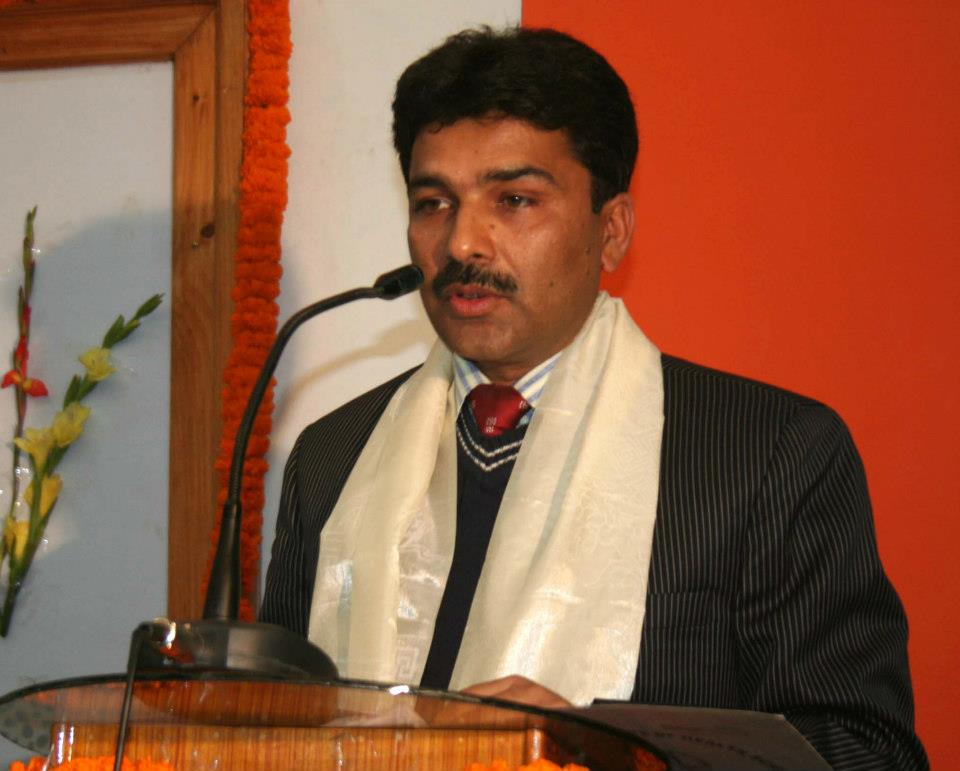
- Born: 29 April 1969 (age 57); Salyan, Nepal
- Education: Tribhuvan University (LLM)
- Occupations: Writing, civil service
- Known for: Poetry, Story, Song

Ramesh Kshitij (Nepali: रमेश क्षितिज; born on 25 April 1969) is a Nepali poet, lyricist and a writer. He is best known for the poetry, and has also written stories and songs.

== Early life ==
Ramesh Kshitij spent his childhood at Mirauli, Hekuli of Dang and received his early education from Sidda Janata Secondary School at Shri Gaon. He started his higher education from Nepal Law Campus, Kathmandu and completed his Master of Laws from Tribhuvan University. He then joined the civil service, Government of Nepal in the year 1999 (BS 2056). He has worked in various districts Dang, Rolpa and Dhading as a Local Development Officer of the Government of Nepal.

== Writings and publications ==
He started writing poems at an early age. He wrote poems while he studied at 4th grade and a play at fifth. His poems have been published in different newspapers and literary magazines. His first volume of poems "Arko Sanjh Parkhera Saanjhma" was published in 2000 (BS 2057) with a preface by the famous poet Tulsi Diwas.

The famous Nepali poet and critic Mr. Hari Adhikary has written in his criticism about the second anthology Ghar Farkiraheko Manis that, "Amongst the new generation of Nepali poets, the poetry of Ramesh Kshitij stands along; it defies any categorization."

During his service as a Local Development Officer in the rural districts of Nepal, he had said to have practiced his poetry, focusing on humanity and pain.

"Tirkhayeko Kakakul Sari Vaye, Kunai Namitho Bhul Sari Vaye" was sung by Nepali singer Rajesh Payal Rai which was recorded in Radio Nepal in 2047 B.S. for the first time. Another of his songs sung by Rai was "Namaga Masanga Sahara Namaga, Bhuima Chhu Aakashka Juntara Namaga..", for which he was honoured as best lyricist in 2050 B.S.

Batuwaa he maanchhe vannu yo sansaaramaa
Junjastai chamki hida andhakaarma
Bagchha aanshu ekaantamaa bagi jaana deu
Khushi tara boki hinda anuhaarma

This song was sung by Ms.Anju Panta which was included in Kshitij album. About a hundred songs of Kshitij have already been recorded which give a message of hope, inspiration, philosophical view, new thought and positive attitude out of which twenty-five songs have been recorded in Radio Nepal.

His songs are perhaps the most highly regarded. His works are noted for their rhythmic, optimistic, and lyrical nature. Either poetry or songs, through his creation he gives inspiration to live life, awareness and love to his readers.

== Major books and album published ==
=== Poetry collections ===
- Arko Saanjh Parkhera Saanjhma, 2057 BS. Kathmandu: Fineprint, Nepal 2012.
- Ghar Farkiraheko Manis, Bhadra 2069 BS, Poush 2069 BS, Shrawan 2070 BS. Kathmandu: Fineprint, Nepal 2012

=== Song collection ===
- Aafai Aafno Sathi Bhaye, 2063 BS

=== Song album ===
- Kshitij, 2068 BS

=== Book(s) yet to come ===
- Ustai Chhu Ma

== Awards and honors ==
Kshitij has received many awards and honors. He is well known lyricist and his Nepali song "Namaaga Masanga Sahaaraa Namaaga" received the best lyricist of the year BS 2050 (1993) honored by Radio Nepal. Apart from many honours and public felicitations, he was also awarded with the First National Poetry Festival Award, Rapti Literary Award and Mohan Regmi Smriti Samman felicitation. His song album "Kshitij" was awarded with the Rapti Music Award BS 2069 in different genres. He has also been awarded by the Government of Nepal for 'Best Civil Servant of the year 2069' (2012) and Local Development Award in 2013.

Some most notable awards and felicitations he received include:

- 1993 (BS 2050): Best lyricist, Radio Nepal
- 1994 (BS 2051): First, National Poetry Festival, Nepal Academy
- 2011 (BS 2068): Rapti Literary Award
- 2011 (BS 2068): Mohan Regmi Smriti Sammaan
- 2012 (BS 2069): Rapti Music Award
- 2012 (BS 2069): Best Civil Service Award, Government of Nepal
- 2013 (BS 2070): Local Development Award

== Interviews ==
- Kshitij Ekdamai Najikko Sathi ho, क्षितिज एकदमै नजिकको साथी हो
- Ma Sachha Kabitabadi Kabi, म सच्चा कवितावादी कवि, कलम, Sourya Dainik, Saturday, 8 December 2012
- Kabitama Dubda Dhyanma Basejasto Laagchha, कवितामा डुव्दा ध्यानमा बसेजस्तो लाग्छ, Blast Times, Thursday, 28 January 2013
- Fan Club of Ramesh Kshitij, फ्यान क्लब अफ रमेश क्षितिज, Sourya Dainik, Saturday, 18 May 2013

== Notes (articles) ==
1. Sabdavanda Kehi Para, शव्दभन्दा केही पर (Anuvuti), Kantipur, Saturday, 13 October 2012
2. Oh Kabita My First Love, ओ कविता माई फस्र्ट लभ, Kabi Sambaad, Saptarang, Naya Patrika, Thursday, 11 October 2012
3. Tokyoma Ek Din, टोकियोमा एक दिन, Nagarik, Saturday, 5 January 2013
4. Dharan Pugda, धरान पुग्दा (Anubhuti), Kantipur Koseli, Saturday, 16 February 2013
5. Katha (Story), Sourya Dainik
6. Silvia, Sanjh ra Samunra, सिल्भिया, सांझ र समुद्र, Annapurna Post, Saturday 15 June 2013
7. Naya Aabiskaarko Khojima Kabita, नयां आविष्कारको खोजीमा कविता, Koseli, Kantipur, Saturday, 10 August 2013
8. "Dashain Samjhe Tihar Samjhe, दशैं सम्झे तिहार सम्झे"- Ramesh Kshitij, Nagarik, Saturday, 5 October 2013
9. Kabita bhaneko kuntha ho : Kabita-sambad Ramesh Kshitijsanga, कविता भनेको कुण्ठा होइन : कविता–संवाद रमेश क्षितिजसँग, Naya Patrika, National Daily, Monday, 7 October 2013

== See also ==
- Nepali literature
- List of Nepalese poets
