= Sulochana Manandhar =

Nepali poet (born 1955)

Sulochana
- सुलोचना
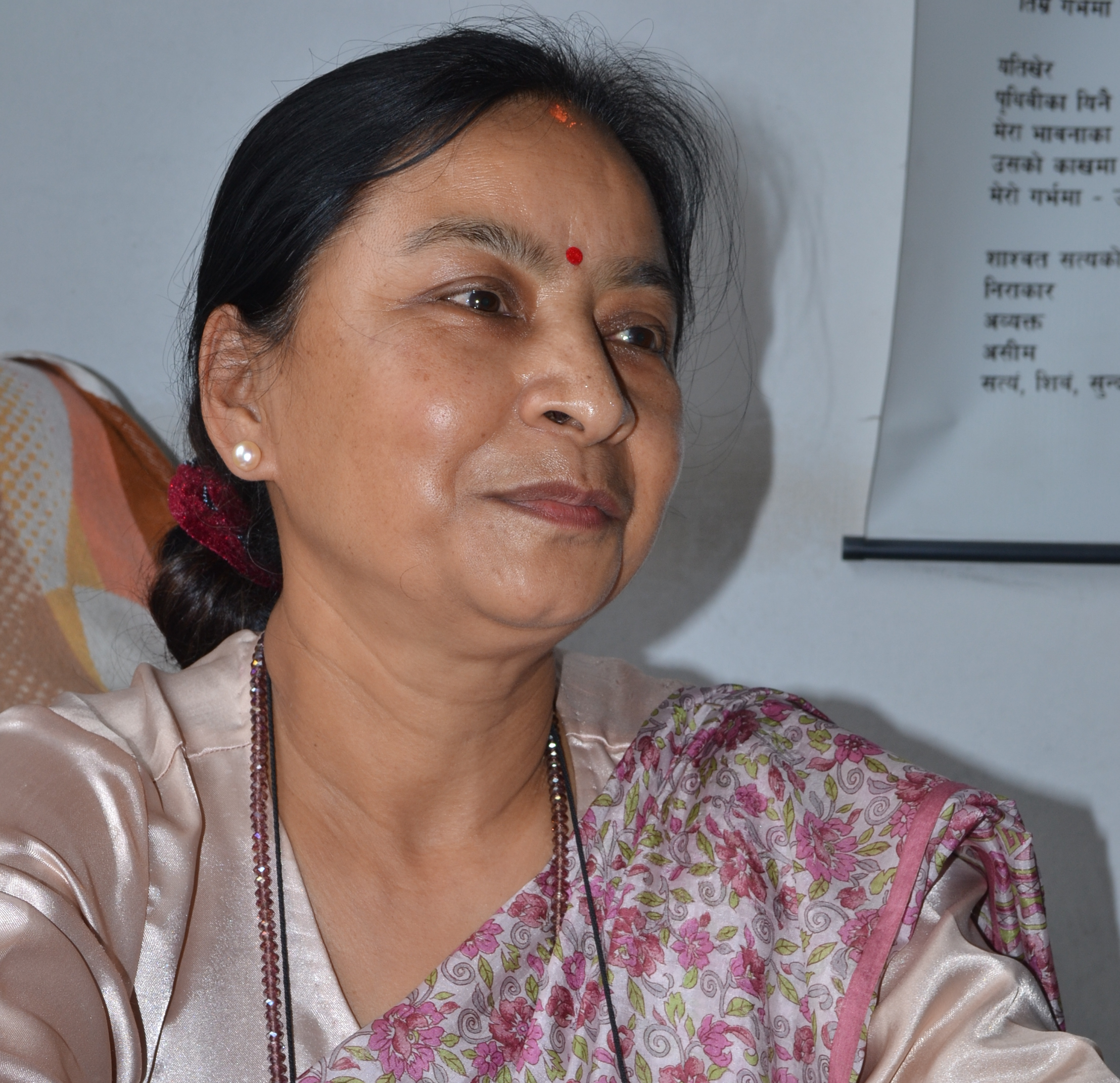
- Manandhar in her office at Nepal Academy (2013)
- Born: Sulochana Manadhar; 12 March 1955 (age 71); Jhochhen, Kathmandu
- Education: East China Normal University
- Occupations: Poet, writer
- Notable work: Raat (2014)
- Spouse: Saroj Dhital

Sulochana Manandhar Dhital (Nepali: सुलोचना मानन्धर धिताल) (born 12 March 1955), professionally known as Sulochana, is a Nepali poet, writer, columnist and political activist. She writes poems in Nepali, Nepalbhasa and Chinese. She served as the Founding Chairman of the Mother Tongue Literature Department of Nepal Academy. Her works has been translated into multiple languages. Raat, Jhyalkhana are some of her popular works.

== Early life and education ==
She was born on 12 March 1955 in Jhochhen, Kathmandu. Her father died eight months after her birth. She was raised by her single mother. After receiving School Leaving Certificate, she started teaching children from Pode community, who were considered untouchables. She joined Ratna Rajya Laxmi Campus for her IA studies.

While studying IA in Ratna Rajya Laxmi Campus, she started getting involve in various political protest. Astalaxmi Shakya was her college friend and a fellow activist. They both left college without receiving any degree after being activally involved in politics. They also studied Chinese language together.

== Political and literary career ==
She played an active role in 1979 student protests demanding a multiparty democracy. She also joined the Nebico Biscuit Factory as a labourer and led a women-only protest demanding labour rights. During these protest, she wrote multiple poems and distribute it in the community to raise awareness among people. During Panchayat regime in Nepal, she was involved in various labour union and women right's protest. After the state started stamping down on protest during 1980, she had to go underground to hide from the government.

Before going underground, she hid her poems in Astalaxmi Shakya's house. Shakya came from an influential family, so there was a less chance of a raid at her house but the state raided Shakya's house, found Sulochana's works and destroyed them. She stopped writing after that time for some years. She then moved to China alongside her husband who was studying medicine there. She resumed writing after returning from China.

She chaired the first ever Mother Tongue Literature Department of Nepal Academy. In 2002, ten of her poems were translated into English by Manjushree Thapa for Nepali Times.

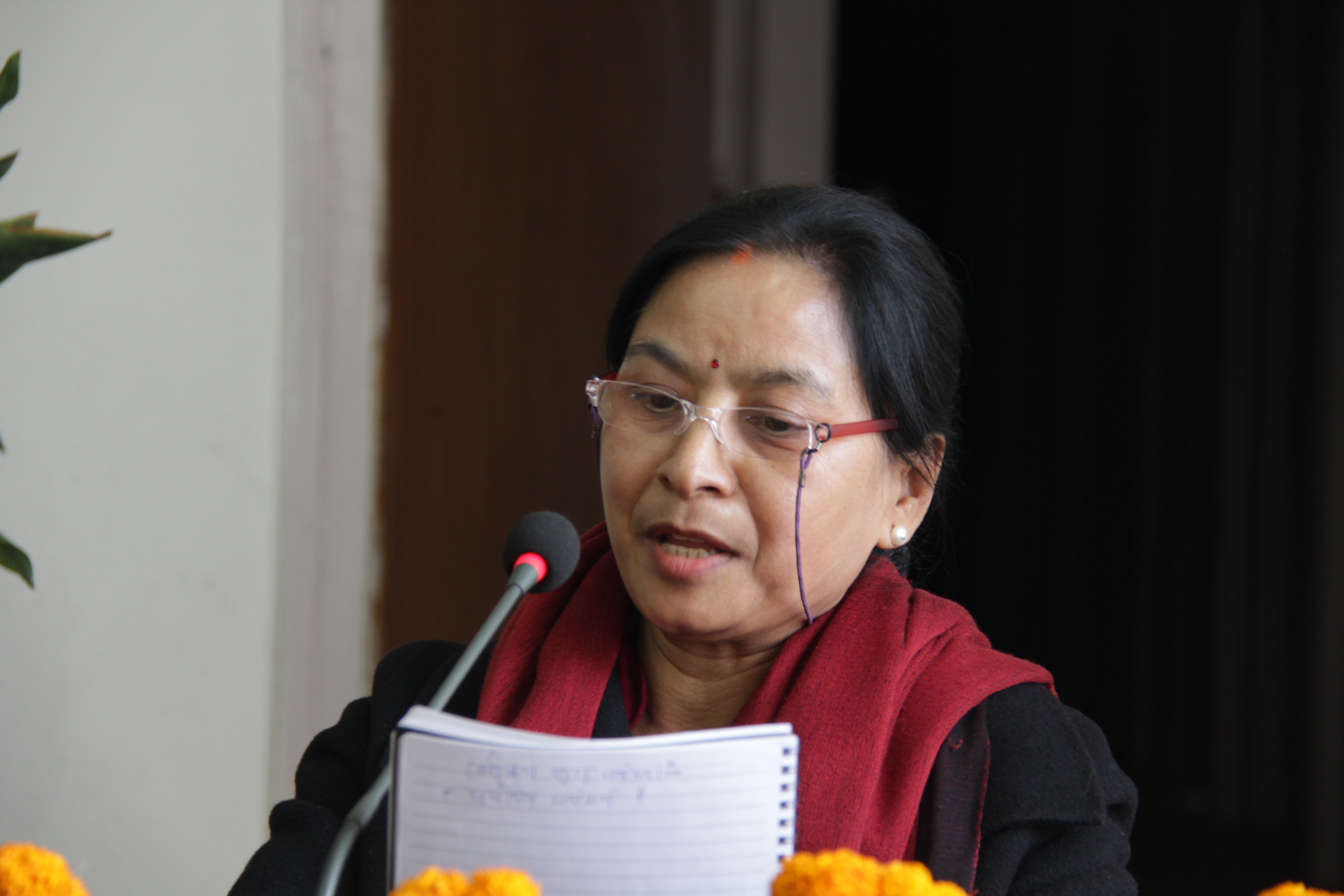
Manandhar at Multilingual Poetry Conference 2014, Kathmandu

She published a poetry collection titled Raat in 2014. The collection was translated in 2017 by Muna Gurung as Night and was published in the United Kingdom by Tilted Axis. The collection was republished in Nepal in 2021.

== Notable works ==
- Jhyalkhana (Short story collection)
- Anubhavka Thopaharu (Poetry collection)
- Itihaska Jiudo Panaharu (Essay collection)
- Tejo-Si (Memoir)
- Arko Golardhaka Maanharu
- Raat (Poetry collection, 2014; translated as Night in 2017)

== Personal life ==
She is married to Saroj Dhital, a doctor. She currently lives in Lazimpat.

== See also ==
- Astalaxmi Shakya
- Toya Gurung
