= Mahananda Poudyal =

Indian writer (1931–2017)

- महानन्द पौडेल
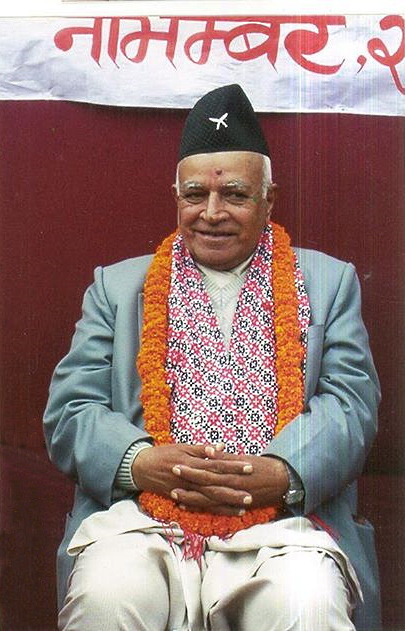
- Born: 19 January 1931; Kalimpong, Darjeeling district, British India
- Died: 12 October 2017 (aged 86); Gangtok, Sikkim, India
- Occupations: Writer, political thinker
- Spouse: Bishu Sharma
- Writing career
- Language: Nepali

Mahananda Poudyal (Nepali: महानन्द पौडेल; 19 January 1931 – 12 October 2017) was an Indian writer, educator, editor, and political thinker known for his contributions to Nepali literature. Active across Sikkim, Darjeeling, and Kalimpong, he wrote poetry, short stories, critical essays, translations, and folk tales, and was involved in the socio-political movement for Gorkha identity. His literary career spanned over six decades.

== Personal life ==
Mahananda Poudyal was born in Kalimpong, Darjeeling district, India on 19 January 1931. His father's name was Khadananda Poudyal. He obtained his primary education from St. Michael Roman Catholic School, Kalimpong. Later, he went on to study at the Scottish Universities Mission Institution (SUMI). He was a very bright student from a young age. So immediately after finishing high school, he was hired to work as a teacher in Tashi Namgyal Senior Secondary School (TNSSS) in Gangtok, Sikkim. After working for about 3 years he decided to attend college and completed his bachelor's degree which he received in 1956 from Darjeeling Government College. He then went on to complete his Masters of Arts (MA) degree from Tribhuvan University, Kathmandu Nepal. Once completing his education, he came back to work as a teacher in the Government of Sikkim for about 11 years quickly rising to the position of deputy director for the Department of Education of Sikkim in 1977. In 1988, he retired from his position in the Department of Education to pursue a full-time career in Nepali literature. He was married to Bishnu Sharma, who remained a supportive partner throughout his personal and professional life.

Poudyal died in Gangtok, Sikkim on 12 October 2017, at the age of 86.

== Literary work ==
Known to be inspired by his own family and people surrounding him in his daily life, Mahananda Poudyal found a mentor in his own father Khadananda Poudyal, who was a well-known Sanskrit scholar. The first poem Mahananda Poudyal wrote was titled Mitra Barga (which means My Friends). It was published in the school magazine of the Scottish Universities Mission Institution in 1952. He also wrote short stories, essays, travelogues and criticisms. His publications include Jhumra Ko Putali (1988), Hamra Kehi Lok Katha (1988), Shakespheare Ka Kehi Natya Katha (1996), Bichar Afnai Chhitiz Tira (1996), Chanda Ra Alankar (1988), Sanobhai, Shree Katha, Fulharu, Patiharu (2002) and Bhasha Sahitya Barha Bakhan. A complete list of his publications are as follows

Short stories

- Jhumra Ko Putali (collection of short stories)

Poems

- Mitra Barga, first poem published.

Folktales collection

- Hamra Kehi Lokkatha (Folk tales)

Edited works

- Dhrubatara
- Sahitya Sankshep
- Parijaat
- Padya Saurav
- Gadya Saurav
- Sikkim ka Pratham Kawi Santabir Limboo-Krititwa Katipaya
- Kawi Narendra Kumai Krititwa Ewam Mulyankan

Translations

- Shakespeare Ka Kehin Natya Katha, (Nepali translation of Shakespeare's dramatic stories)
- Sanobhai (Translation from Hindi)

Mahananda Poudyal has been an active contributor in many literary magazines and journals. In addition he has been the editor of various publications in the region. His association with some of the journals and publications include

- 1954- Nav Prabhat, Bi monthly with Co editor Miss Sanumati Rai
- 1955 – 56 Gorkha Weekly : Member of the editorial board
- 1957 – Bulletin of the 'All Sikkim Student Association' Darjeeling
- 1958 – 'Pole Star', a Tri lingual literary Bulletin of the 'All Sikkim Student Association' Darjeeling
- 1956 – Co editor, Sahitya Sanket, Kalimpong (One of his works in his college days)
- 1956 – Co editor 'Kanaka'
- 1982 – 'Akashdeep' literary magazine of his own publication 'Akashdeep publication'. Chief Editor
- 1984 – 86 – 'Bhanu Smarkia' Gangtok, Chief Editor
- 1988 – 94 – 'Jan Pukar' {24 issues } News fort nightly.
- 1994 Basundhara Literary magazine from Siliguri : Akashdeep publication.
- 2006 onwards – Chief Editor 'Sandhan' A high level literary journal

Given his contributions to the Nepali literature, Mahananda Poudyal himself has been a subject of many dissertation works for scholars of Nepali Literature. Some of them include:

- Mahananda Poudyal ko Jiwani Byaktitwa ra Krititwa ko Adhyan by Narayan Bhattarai, Tribhuwan University, Kathmandu 2007
- Mahananda Poudyal ani unko Jhumra ko Putali, Katha Sanghra ko Kriti Parak ko Adhyan by Narmaya Dangal, Tribuhan University 2008
- Mahananda Poudyal ka Katha Kriti haroo ko Bislesanatkmak Adhyan ra mulyankan by Deepa Sharma, North Bengal University 2009
- A research work done by five eminent writers published by Karuna Devi Smarak Dharmartha Guthi, Gangtok (Mahananda Poudyal : Unka Wiwid Kriti harooma) 2008
- Mahananda Poudyal Abhinandan anka of Pardeshi, A literary magazine, published by Agam Singh Giri Pratisthan Saluwa, West Midnapur, West Bengal.
- 'Mahananda Poudyal: Unka Wiwid Kriti Haroo' published by Rachana Publications Gangtok.
- Special Issue of 'Pardeshi' by Agam Singha Giri Sansthan, Saluwa.

== Other works ==
Apart from literary activities, Manahanda Poudyal was also engaged in various political and social activities in Darjeeling and its adjacent regions. He took active participation in the Gorkha identity and upliftment movement and has written several articles on the Akhil Bharatiya Gorkha League. It can be safely assumed that some of his writings have been influenced by the political philosophy of the Gorkhaland movement. These writings drew the attention of the people towards the movement.

He was associated with several social and literary organizations such as Gorkha Dukha Niwarak Sammelan, Akhil Bharatiya Gorkha League, Bhanu Jayanti Samaroah Samiti, Sikkim Sahitya Academy, Kendriya Sikshya Parishad, Rashtriya Pathya Pustak Parishad, Kendriya Sahitya Academy and Purviya Parishad Sanskrit Kendra. See the list below :

- Sahitya Akademi, New Delhi (General Council) 1983 - 1988
- Eastern Zonal Cultural Centre, Kolkatta, (A Zonal unit of the Department of Culture, Government of India) 1993 – 1998
- President, Sikkim Akademi-1999
- Member: Golden Jubilee Celebration of India's Independence, a state level Committee.
- Member: Textbook and courses of studies, C.B.S.E, New Delhi.
- State President, Vidya Bharati Sansthan, Lucknow on personal capacity.

== Awards ==
For his contributions to the Nepali literature, Mahananda Poudyal has been awarded multiple recognitions. See list below for some of them

- Nepali Sahitya Sammelan award 1998
- Bhanu Puraskar by Nepali Sahitya Parishad, Gangtok 1999
- Shiva Kumar Rai Smriti Puraskar by South Sikkim Sahitya Sammelan, Namchi 2004
- Dr. Parasmani Pradhan Puraskar by Nepali Sahitya Adhyayan Samiti, Kalimpong 2006.
- Basibiyalo Puraskar by Basibiyalo Pariwar, Kalimpong 2009

He has also been felicitated on numerous occasions including:

- Sahitik Patrakar Sanga, Kathmandu 2004
- Mahakavi Deokota Satabdi Samaroha Committee, Kathmandu 2010
- Sikkim Samman Sammilan by Dept. of Culture, Govt. of Sikkim Gangtok 2004
- Nepali Sammelan, New Delhi and Sahitya Akademi, New Delhi (Joint venture) 2009
- Bhasha Diwas Celebration, Nepali Sahitya Parishad, Darjeeling 2009
- Nepali Department of Sikkim University 2013
- Pakyong Palatine College foundation day celebration, Pakyong, East Sikkim 2013

== See also ==
- Nepali literature
