= Sangita Swechcha =

Nepalese writer

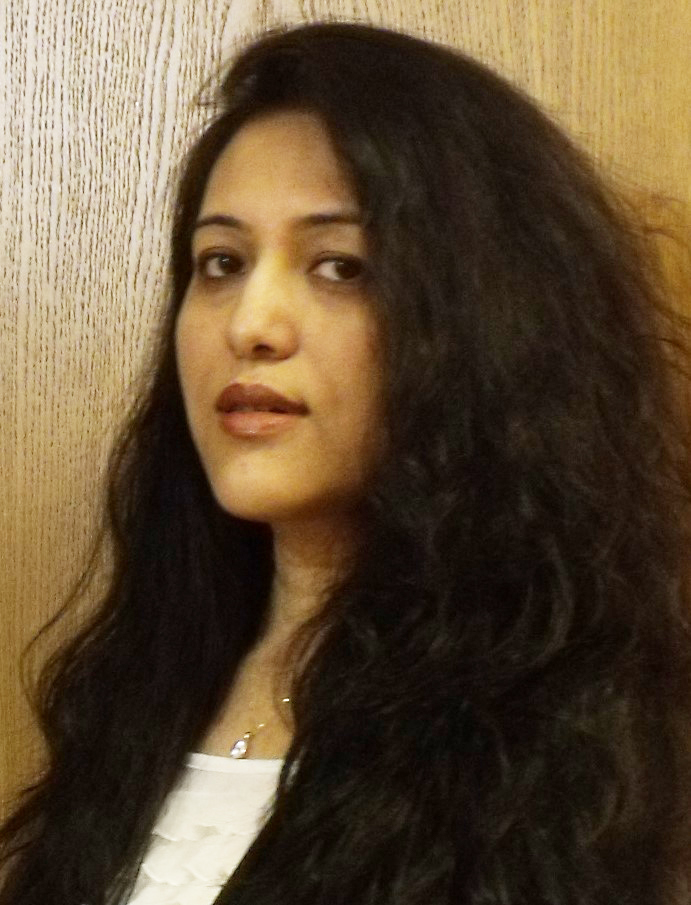
- Born: Kathmandu, Nepal
- Education: PhD
- Alma mater: University of Surrey
- Occupations: Poet, scholar
- Writing career
- Genres: Story, Poetry, Novel
- Website: www.sangitaswechcha.com

Sangita Shrestha, also known Sangita Swechcha, is a Nepali writer, poet and scholar based in England. Her short stories, poems, and articles have been published in numerous international journals and online platforms.

Her first novel, ‘Pakhalieko Siundo,’ which she wrote at the age of 18, centers on the emotional journey of Sandhya, a Nepalese woman, delving deep into her experiences of pain, suffering, and her unwavering determination to conquer her past, all while shedding light on the pervasive problem of human trafficking in Nepal.

Sangita was the Guest Editor for the ‘Nepali Literature Month – Nov 2019’ held at Global Literature in Libraries Initiative (GLLI), a US-based organization working towards the visibility of world literature.

== Books ==
- Gualfsanga Ko Prem, short stories
- Pakhaliyeko Siudo, novel, republished in 2024 as 'Seto Siundo'
- Asahamatika Pailaharu, short stories
- The Himalayan Sunrise: Exploring Nepal's Literary Horizon, edited by Sangita Swechcha and Karen Van Drie
- A Glimpse Into My Country: An Anthology Of International Short Stories, edited by Andrée Roby and Sangita Swechcha
- Rose's Odyssey: Tales of Love and Loss, short story collection, 2024

== Awards ==
- ANESAS Nawaratna Award
- Ambassador for Peace, Universal Peace Federation, 2023
