= Bhupal Rai =

Nepali poet, lyricist, and writer (born 1960)

- भुपाल राई

Chancellor of Nepal Academy
- Appointed by: Minister of Culture and Civil Aviation

Personal details
- Born: December 29, 1960 (age 65) Bastim-8, Bhojpur District, Nepal
- Citizenship: Nepalese
- Spouse: Jas Rani Rai
- Children: Ridum Rai
- Occupation: Poet

Bhupal Rai (Nepali: भुपाल राई; born December 29, 1960) is a Nepali poet, lyricist, writer, editor, and the chancellor of the Nepal Academy. Rai has advocated for the rights of the Kirati people through his writing. His work blends Marxist philosophy with the socio-cultural pragmatism of the indigenous Kirati community.

== Early life ==
Bhupal Rai was born in the Bastim village of Bhojpur (also known as Maajh Kirat), a district in eastern Nepal. After graduating highschool, he moved to Kathmandu for his higher studies.

Rai began writing as a student. In 1997, he published his first poem, titled "Aama ko Samjhana", in Chhahara Daimashik, a semi-monthly newspaper in Nepal.

== Published books ==
Rai has authored six books, and worked on various publications, which include:

- Sumnima Ko Tasveer (1996)
- Dajai Kavita Gaau Mai Chha (2000)
- Pahilo Haraf Sirbandi (1999)
- Simanta Soundarya (2010)
- Bhumigat Prashna Haru (2012)
- Aago le Janmotsav Manaudaina (2015)

== Awards ==
- Best Lyricist in Radio Nepal (1992)
- Best Lyricist "NEFEJ Song" competition (1994)
- Nepali Pratibha Pratisthan Award UK (2015)
