= Yuddha Prasad Mishra =

Nepali poet

Yuddha Prasad Mishra (1964-2047 BS) (Nepali: युद्धप्रसाद मिश्र) was a progressive Nepali poet.

== Biography ==
Mishra was born in the month of Poush in 1964 BS at Somlingtar of Bhaktapur district. His mother was Geeta Kumari and father was Rudra Prasad Mishra. His family was relatively rich because his family served for the Rana regime.

His father died when he was one and half years old. Then after, he was brought in his maternal home. His mother started his schooling in home. Later, his maternal grandfather appointed a teacher for his primary education at home. After his primary education, Mishra joined Durbar High School where he studied Veda for a year. At that time graduating from grade 3, the system called ‘Teen Pass’ was required to get government jobs. He passed the exam and joined the job of Nausinda at Kumari Chowk for 9 years. After passing fourth grade (‘Char Paas’) he was given the recognition of fourteen pass due to his high performance. He worked as Bahidar (clerk) at the treasury of junior queen in Rana Prime Minister Bhim Shamsher palace up to 1990 BS.

Mishra married Lok Kumari Devkota in 1986 BS and parented four sons and five daughters. But three of his daughters died. At the age of 20, Mishra's mother also died.

In 2000 BS, he rejoined public service at Birgunj Circle Office as Subedaar (senior clerk). In 2003 BS, Nepali National Congress Party was established. Mishra was attracted to the theme of party. In 2004 BS, he was expelled from his job and arrested on the charge of his involvement with congress for anti-government activities and prisoned for two years and four months. Mishra's health deteriorated due to torture in the jail. After he was released, he went to Patna (India) for treatment and spent a year. He had some shares of cinema hall in Birgunj from which he was getting some income. However, he was forced to withdraw his shares because of his anti-Rana activities. That withdrawal worsened his financial life.

After the uprising of 2007 BS, he rejoined his job as Khardaar (storekeeper) at Birgunj office. Soon, he was promoted to Subba (section clerk). In 2010 BS, Nepali Congress charged him of corruption and put him into legal complications for many years. He was later reinstated to the post of Subba by the government.

In 2012 BS, he went Banaras and renounced the principles of Congress Party and started to follow the Communist philosophies. In Banaras, he met Pushpa Lal and other leaders of Communist Party of Nepal. By 2016 BS, he was working as a Subba in tax office of Singha Durbar. After a year he was transferred to Bardiya until 2018 BS when he got retired from government service.

After 2018 BS, he went in exile to Banaras with his family, where he faced many financial problems. The communist party used to provide him some financial aid, but it was stopped after he started criticizing the weakness of the party. At that time, there were multiple communist parties. He believed on the unity of all communist parties. Therefore, he never took membership of any of the communist party. During his exile, in 2028 BS, he served the leading role as the president of Nepal Janbadi Sansrkitik Sangh (Nepal People's Cultural Association). He returned Nepal in 2040 BS.

Mishra also took part in the uprising against the autocratic Panchayat rule for which he was arrested on 3 Chaitra, 2047 BS. Mishra died on 6 Falgun, 2047 in Bir Hospital at the age of 83.

== Writing career ==
Mishra started writing poems in his early teens. In 1986 BS, he wrote a collection of poems titled Ahimsa Prarthana (Non-violence Prayers). Bhim Shamsher ordered the book to be confiscated and burnt, stating that the book was against the Ranas. The incident further encouraged Mishra to write more. In 1988 BS, he published a poem named Bidhyarthi Sikchya (Student Education) in Gorkhapatra. That was his first published work. Initially, his poems were based on romanticism, but later he started writing progressive poems to fight against the injustice and indiscretion of Rana regime.

== Works ==
The published works of Mishra are:

- Chari (Bird), poem collection (1994 BS)
- Badhi (Flood), poem collection (2029 BS)
- Amar Katha (Immortal Stories, story collections (2015 BS)
- Mukti Narayan, Short epic
- Mukta Sudama (Free Sudama), Short epic
- Yudhha Prasad Mishraka Kavitaharu, etc.

He also wrote children's poem. Some of which are:

- Badar School Jawaun (Lets go school monkey)
- Hamro Bhainsi Bubu Dinche (Our buffalo gives milk)
- Sakchu Fadkina (I can jump)
- Launa Maile Ke Garne (What should I do now?)

== Recognition ==
- Mishra was awarded for the best poet in 1994 BS
- Nepal Bhasa Prakashini Samiti had awarded his book ‘Chari’ in 1994 BS
- Felicitated by Pragatisheel Lekhak Sangh (Progressive Writers Association) in 2041 BS
- A postage stamp was issued in his name in 1995 by Nepal Government

== Impact ==
- Yuddha Prasad Mishra Smriti Pratisthan, an organization dedicated to literary works, was formed in his name after his death. The organization has awarded 16 writers and institutions for their literary contributions.

== See also ==
- List of Nepalese poets
