= Ganesh Lal Shrestha =

Nepalese poet

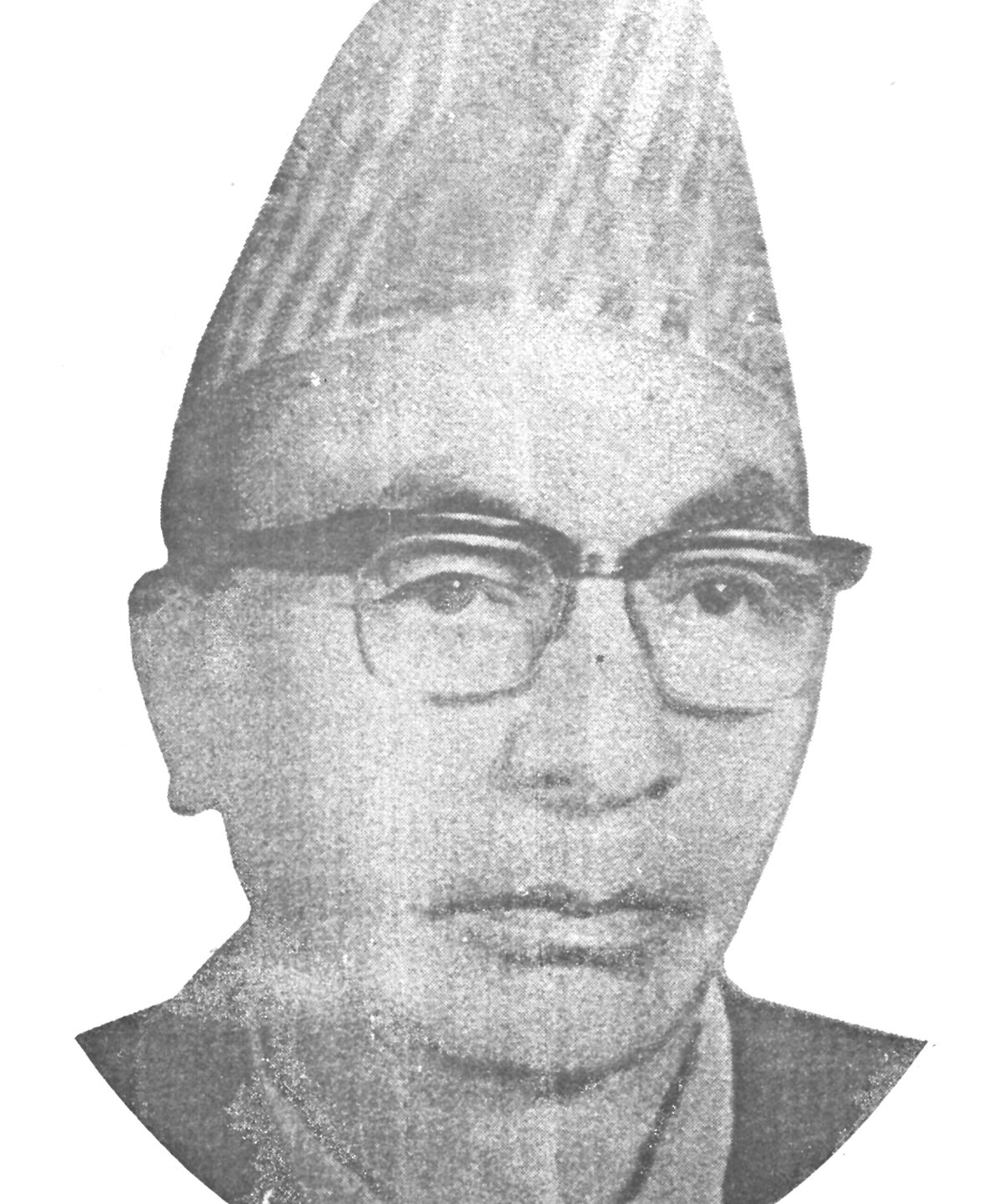
Ganesh Lal Shrestha

Ganesh Lal Shrestha (Nepali: गणेशलाल श्रेष्ठ; July 1911 – 24 July 1985) was a Nepalese poet, musician and social worker. He wrote in Nepali, Nepal Bhasa and Tamang languages. His songs denounced the social inequalities and autocratic political system of the day.

== Trader and writer ==
Ganesh Lal was born in Bhimphedi, Makwanpur District to father Madhav Lal and mother Chandra Kumari Shrestha. His first wife Chandra Maya died in 1948, and he was married a second time in 1956 to Narayan Devi.

Bhimphedi, located 35 km to the southwest of the Nepalese capital Kathmandu, is a market town on the old trade route linking India and Tibet. Ganesh Lal's family owned a store shop which sold general merchandise and cloth. Ganesh Lal looked after the shop and spent his free time composing songs. During festivals, he took part in stage performances and music recitals.

Bhimphedi began to wither after the district headquarters was shifted to Hetauda. Subsequently, Ganesh Lal moved there and opened a cloth shop. He died in Hetauda.

In 1999, a statue of Ganesh Lal was erected on the premises of Nepal Bhasa Khala in Hetauda.

== Publications ==
- Mera Dui Pushpānjali ("My Two Offerings of Flowers") (1943), a collection of songs in Nepali.
- Niphwa Swān ("Two Flowers") (1956), a collection of songs in Nepal Bhasa.
- Lokanhwāgu Mye Munā ("A Collection of Popular Songs") (1999), a collection of songs in Nepal Bhasa.

== Lyrics ==
A verse from one of his most famous Nepal Bhasa songs appears below.

धिक्कार जनम मिसायागु करम
मां बौ ख्वयेका: त्व:ता वनेगु
कतपिंथाय वयानं भ्वातिं जू थें जुयानं
जाय ख्वबि हायेका च्वनेगु

A curse to be born, the fate of woman
To leave one's parents weeping
To come to another's place and be like a maidservant
Even then to let tears fall on one's rice.
