= Gyandil Das =

Nepalese poet and social reformer (1821–1883)

Gyan Dil Das
- Born: Srikrishna Lamichhane; 1821; Ilam District, Kingdom of Nepal
- Died: 1883 (aged 61–62); Kingdom of Sikkim
- Occupation: Saint
- Writing career
- Pen name: Saint Gyan Dil Das
- Language: Nepali
- Genres: Poems, Religious songs
- Notable work: Udayalahari

Gyandil Das (Nepali: ज्ञानदिल दास; 1821–1883) was a Nepalese poet and social reformer, later known as a "Saint". He opposed existing social discrimination, such as prevalent caste biases and gender-based violence, through his written compositions.

Gyandil Das was born to a Brahmin family in a village of Aamchok, Phakphokthum-3, in Eastern Nepal. He had a deep knowledge of Vedas and Puranas. Belonging to a higher Brahmin caste, he showed empathy towards the lower caste people suppressed by the higher caste. Gyandil began to write against social injustices, which incited Jung Bahadur Rana to arrest and imprison him for six months. After being freed, he joined the prominent Josmani religious sect and inducted the Nirguna (attribute-less God) concept in the Nepali devotional poetry. He composed 'Udayalahari' in 1877, in Darjeeling, which consists of verses in devotion to the Nirguna Brahma.

Gyandil Das was bestowed the Josmani Dikshya by his Guru, Shyamdil Das. After becoming a Josmani follower, he visited many places in Eastern Nepal, Darjeeling, and Sikkim to promote and expand the religious ideology.

== Poetry ==
Gyandil Das composed poems, devotional songs and verses. Most of his works are written in traditional jhyaure meter 5-5-6. He has authored Tungna Bhajans, Jhyaure Bhajans and Udayalahari.

He died in Geiling, Western Sikkim, in 1883. The Nepal Government honored him by publishing a Saint Gyandil Das postage stamp in 1980.

== See also ==
- List of Nepalese poets
