= Agam Singh Giri =

Indian Nepali-language poet

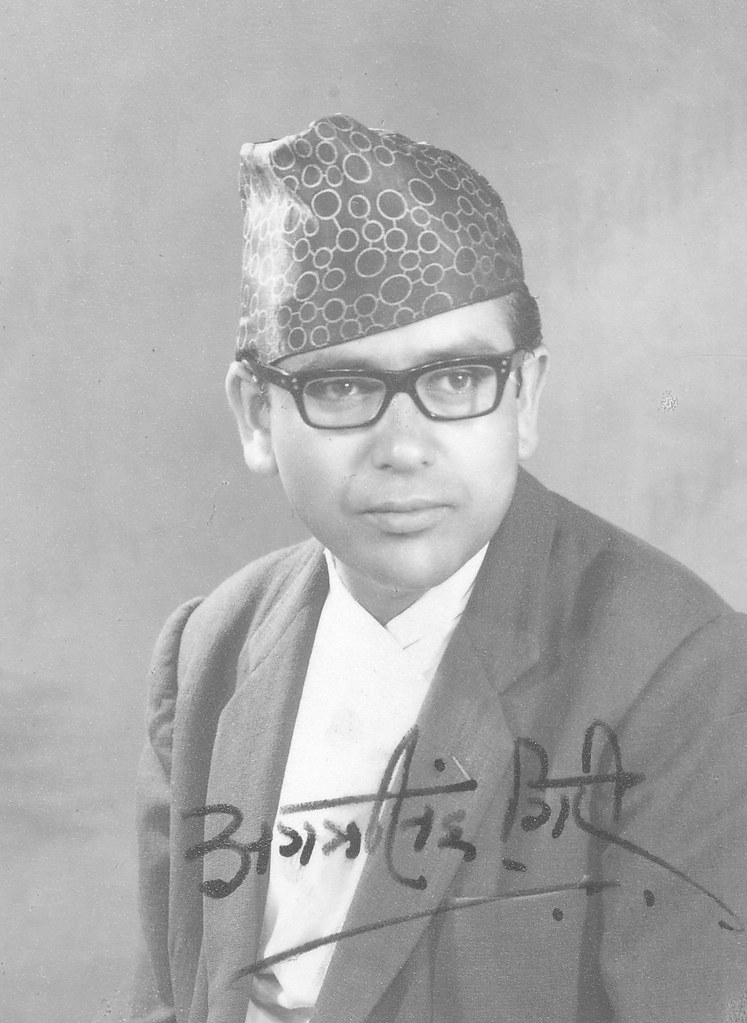
- Born: 27 December 1927; Darjeeling, Bengal Presidency, India
- Died: 31 January 1971 (aged 43); Darjeeling, West Bengal, India
- Occupations: Poet, lyricist
- Writing career
- Language: Nepali, English
- Notable work: Yaad/ Atma Katha/
- Notable awards: Ratnashree Gold Award

Agam Singh Giri (27 December 1927 – 31 January 1971) was an Indian Nepali language poet and lyricist from Darjeeling, West Bengal.

== Early life ==
Agam Singh Giri, born on 27 December 1927, he is generally regarded as the founding member of the Indian Nepali literature. He was an important figure, specially in reviving the love for one's own place. He was the first one to make an important distinction between Indian Nepali (those who were born in India) and Nepalese from Nepal. For any student of Political Science, History, or even a student taking keen interest in the history of the region, his work, "Yuddha ani Yoddha" is highly recommended.

Giri was born in a place called Maidan near Chourasta. His original name was Hemraj Giri.
