= Sarita Tiwari =

Nepalese poet (born 1980)

- सरिता तिवारी
- Born: 15 April 1979 (age 47); Pokhara, Gandaki
- Education: Prithvi Narayan Campus
- Occupations: Poet; writer; advocate
- Notable work: Prashnaharuko Karkhana
- Movement: Samrakshan Kabita Andholan

Sarita Tiwari (born 1980) is a Nepalese poet, writer and advocate. She has written three books till date and regularly writes articles and columns for many national newspapers and online portals. Her poetry collection Prashnaharuko Karkhana was shortlisted for the Madan Puraskar for the year 2015 (2072 BS).

== Biography ==
She was born on 15 April 1979 in Pokhara, Nepal. Her mother was a ratyauli singer and used to sing in many wedding parties. Her mother's singing had a significant influence on her. Her family moved and settled in Nawalparasi where she grew up. She started writing poems since she was in 7th grade of her school. She used to participate and win in various poetry competition in school. She then joined Prithvi Narayan Campus in 1997 to study IA and received a bachelor's degree from same college. There she met many influential writers and poets. In college she was a part of a literary movement known as Samrakshan Kabita Andholan. Under the movement, the poets from Pokhara and Kathmandu went to village areas and wrote poems in nature.

Her first poetry collection Buddha ra Lavaharu was published in 2001 (2057 BS). Her second poetry collection was published in 2011 (2067 BS).

Her third book Prashnaharuko Karkhana, a poetry collection was published in 2016 and was shortlisted for the Madan Puraskar for the same year. The collection consists of 34 poems. It was also translated into Hindi as Sawaalon ka Karkhana by Pramod Dhital in 2018. She currently lives in Chitwan with her husband and children.

== Bibliography ==
Title	Year of publication	Note
Buddha ra Lavaharu	2001	
Astitwoko Ghoshanapatra	2011	
Prashnaharuko Karkhana	2016	Shortlisted - Madan Puraskar, 2072 BS (2015–2016)

== See also ==
- Neelam Karki Niharika
- Bimala Tumkhewa
