= Krishnahari Baral =

Nepalese singer and poet

Krishnahari Baral (Nepali: कृष्णहरि बराल; born 4 January 1954) is a Nepali lyricist, songwriter, poet, literary critic, and author who is professor of Nepali at Central Department of Nepali, Tribhuwan University, Kathmandu. Dr. Baral has written more than forty books including course books, literary criticisms, and collection of lyric poetry.

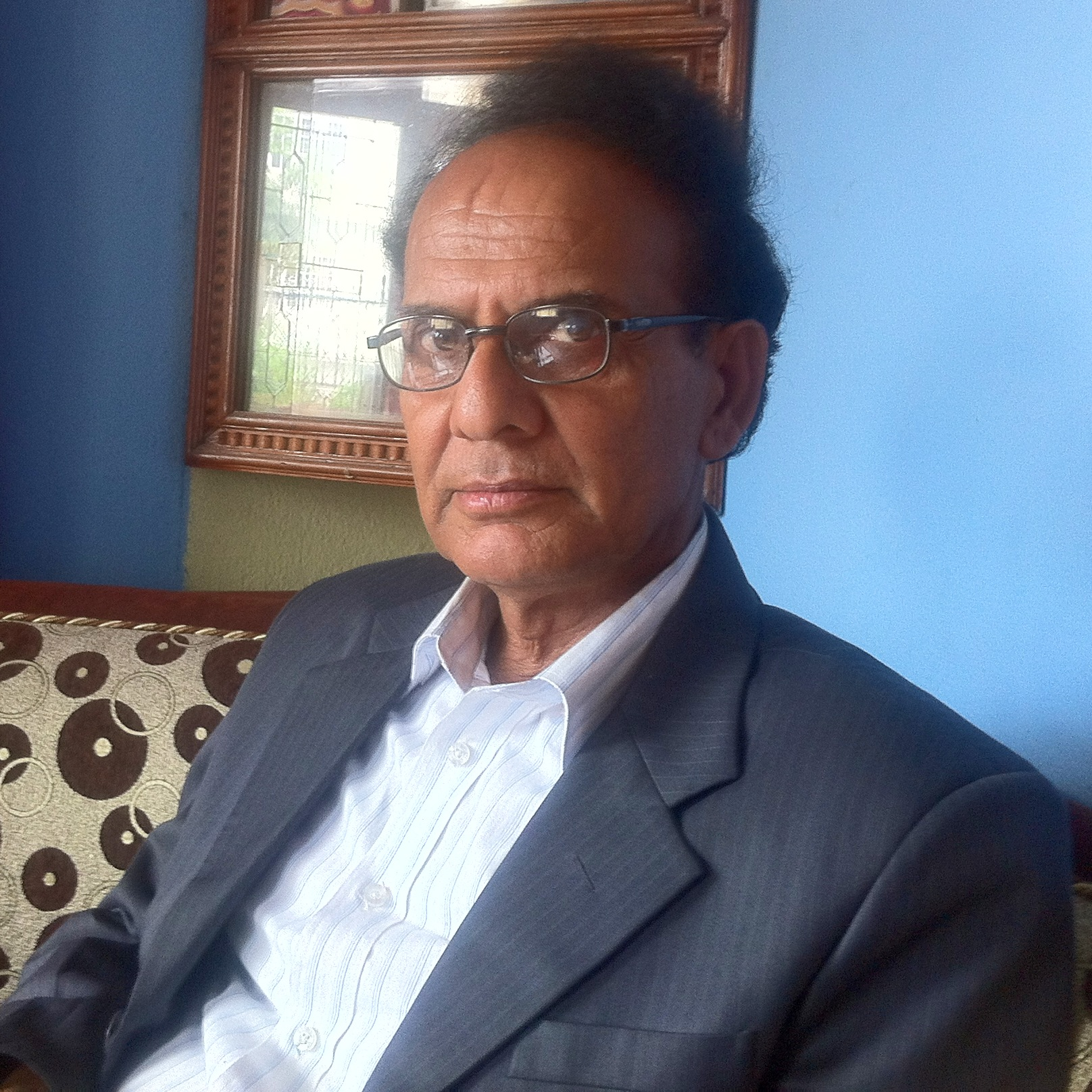
Professor Krishnahari Baral
