= Naba Raj Lamsal =

Nepalese poet (born 1969)

Dr. Naba Raj Lamsal
- नवराज लम्साल
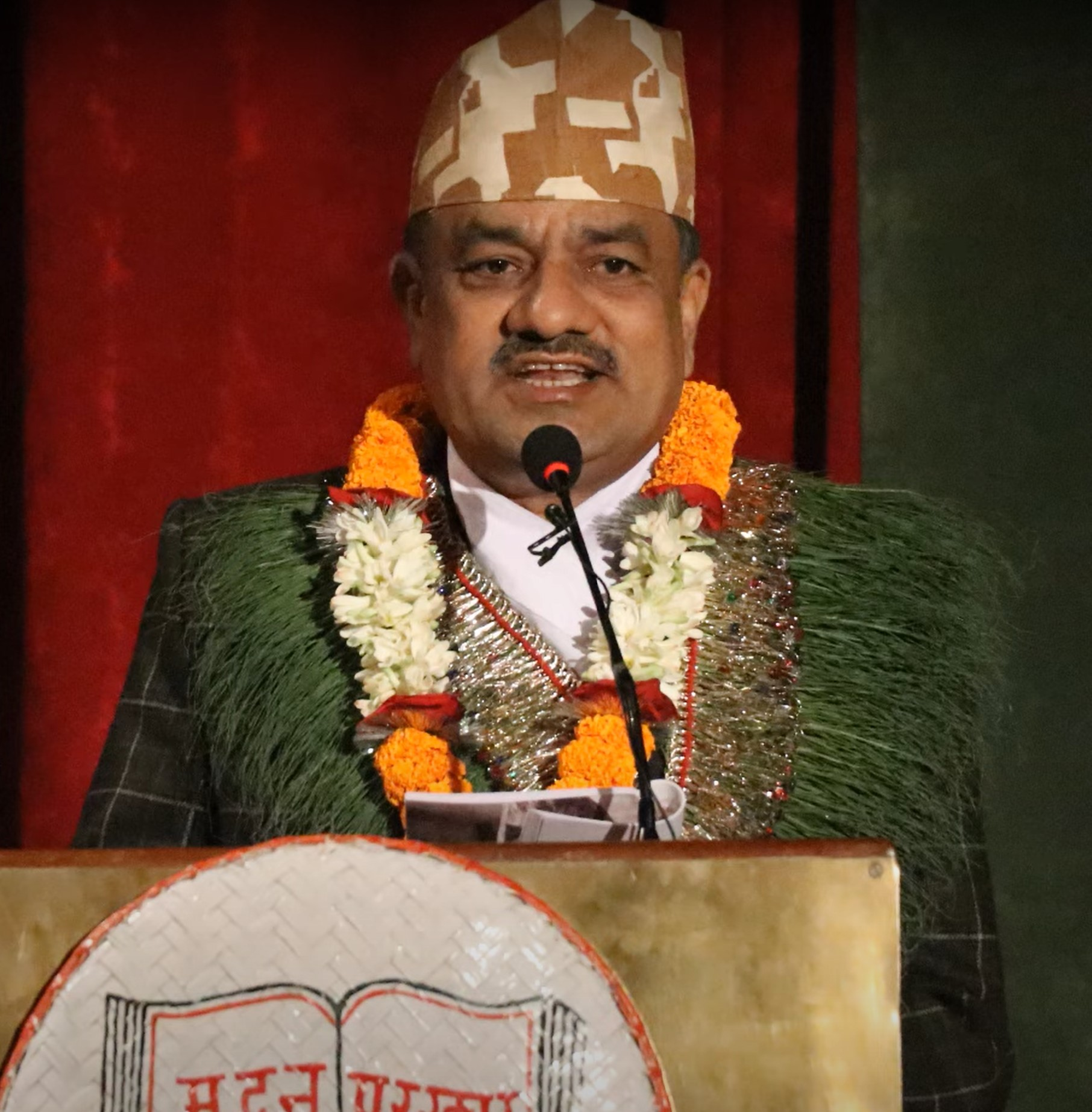
- Lamsal delivering his Madan Puraskar acceptance speech (2022)
- Born: 23 July 1969 (age 56); Jyamrung, Dhading
- Education: Ph. D
- Occupations: Civil Service, radio journalist, poet, writer
- Notable work: Agni
- Spouse: Sangita Lamsal
- Parents: Tanka Prasad Lamsal (father); Hem Kumari Lamsal (mother)
- Awards: Madan Puraskar

Dr. Naba Raj Lamsal (Nepali: नवराज लम्साल, born 23 July 1969) is a Nepalese poet, radio journalist, and government official. He is a director of program division of Radio Nepal. He started his poetry journey in 1984, publishing his first poem in Arunodaya paper titled Bandana.

== Early life and education ==
Lamsal was born and brought up in Nilkantha, Dhading in a Hindu priest family, the son of Tanka Prasad Lamsal and Hem Kumari Lamsal. He grew up listening to Sanskrit chants by his father, which influence his interest in poetry at a very young age. He moved to Kathmandu for further studies after finishing primary education in his hometown. He did his Master's Degree and PhD in Nepali Literature from Tribhuvan University, Nepal. Between 1994 and 2023 A.D., he held the position of Program Director and News Chief at Radio Nepal. From 2008 to 2016 A.D., he worked as a Correspondent for the BBC Nepali Service. He served as the Former President of the Nepali Writers' Association. He also held the position of Former Vice-President at the Nepal Press Union.

He started his professional career at Radio Nepal as a radio host in 1994.

== Awards ==
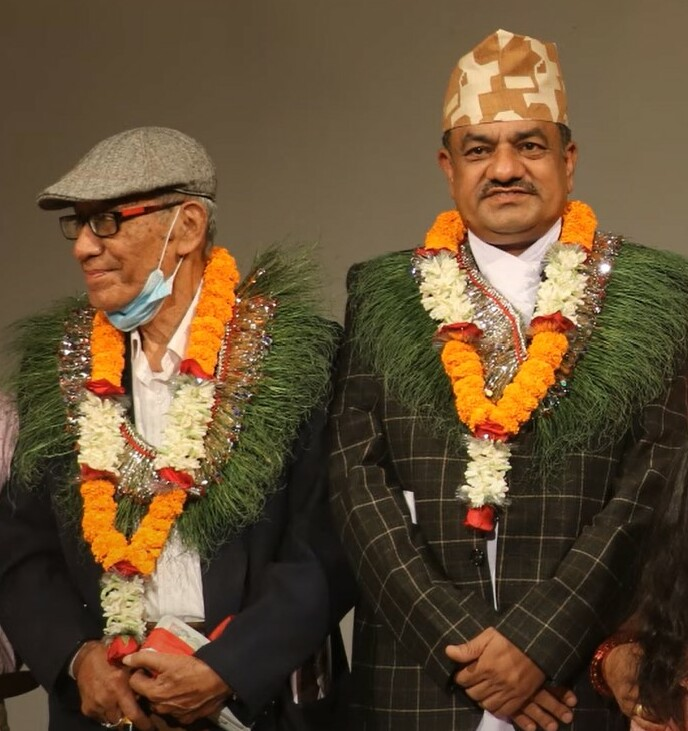
Naba Raj Lamsal at Madan Puraskar award ceremony, alongside Jagadamba Shree Puraskar winner Durga Prasad Shrestha, on his right (2022)

In 2022, he won the Madan Puraskar, Nepal's highest literary honor, for his epic Agni. The book was selected out of 299 submission.Throughout his career, he garnered several accolades, showcasing his exceptional talents. Notably, he received the prestigious Madan Puraskar in 2078 B.S. for his epic "AGNI", a testament to his literary prowess. His accomplishments also included securing first place in various national competitions such as the National Poem competition by Nepal Academy in 2059 B.S., the National Lyrical Music competition by Radio Nepal in 2058 B.S., the National Speech competition by The Reaukai Nepal in 2048 B.S., and the Dhading Literary competition held by Janata Pustakalaya, Dhading in 2049 B.S.

== Works ==
Title of the book	Publisher	Date of Publication	ISBN	Awards
Paile Pichhe Sagarmatha: poem	Bina Pustak Sansar	2004		
Karn: Mahakavya	United Nepal Publication	2009	9937527422	
Udum Udum Lagcha: folk song	Bina Pustak Sansar	2016	9937619882	
Dhara: Mahakavya	Aishwarya Publication	2017	9937021197	
Agni: Mahakavya	Book Hill Publication	2021	9937753066	Madan Puraskar 2022

== Countries Visited ==
USA, Malaysia, Thailand, France, Pakistan, India, Philippines, Qatar and China
