= Girija Prasad Joshi =

Nepalese poet

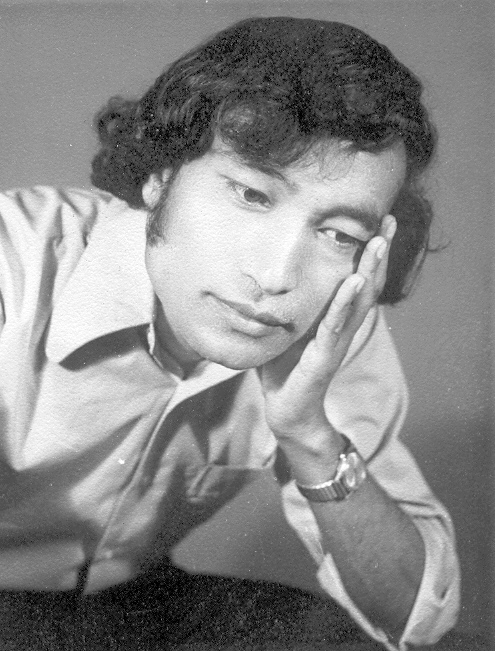
Girija Prasad Joshi

Girija Prasad Joshi (Nepali: गिरिजाप्रसाद जोशी; 1939–1987) was a versatile Nepalese poet who set a new trend in Nepal Bhasa literature. His poems, epics, plays and novels broke tradition and crossed conventional boundaries. He has been honored with the title Great Poet.

== Early life ==
Joshi was born in Sankhu (Sakwa), a small town in the Kathmandu Valley. His father was Dev Prasad and mother Khadga Devi Joshi. After finishing high school, he earned a bachelor's degree in education and taught in various schools. In 1981, he became headmaster of Rastriya Madhyamik Vidyalaya, Indrayani.

== Literary career ==
Joshi published his first poem in Dharmodaya magazine in 1958. He has been described as being influenced by leftist views, but his works encompass a wide range of subjects from progressive to romantic.

His poems and stories speak up for the downtrodden masses. Joshi's writing career spanned the years of the repressive Panchayat system (1962–1990) when Nepal Bhasa writers were arrested and tortured. Writings in languages other than the Nepali language were stifled, and no new publications were allowed to be established. Against this backdrop, Joshi's works inspired literary and cultural movements.

== Publications ==
Joshi was a prolific writer. During the period 1958 to 1987, he produced 11 novels, nine books of poetry, 10 story books, two epics, two plays and four books of songs. His greatest novels are Siluswan and Bipatra. Similarly, Silu-me: Cipukham is a well known novelette.

The poem entitled Hakugunya Nhapanmha Gayak ("The First Singer of the Black Hill") is the longest poem in Nepal Bhasa.
