= Shrawan Mukarung =

Nepalese poet

- श्रवण मुकारुङ
- Born: June 8, 1968 (age 58); Dilpa village, Bhojpur district, Nepal
- Occupations: Poet, writer, songwriter

Shrawan Mukarung (Nepali: श्रवण मुकारुङ) is a Nepalese poet and writer. He was born in Dilpa Village of Bhojpur district on June 8, 1968 (Jestha 26, 2025 BS). He has published two books of poem, one book of songs, one book of drama and one album of songs so far.

Mukarang received a Moti Award from the National Youth Service in 2003.
