= Gopal Prasad Rimal =

Nepalese poet

- गोपाल प्रसाद रिमाल
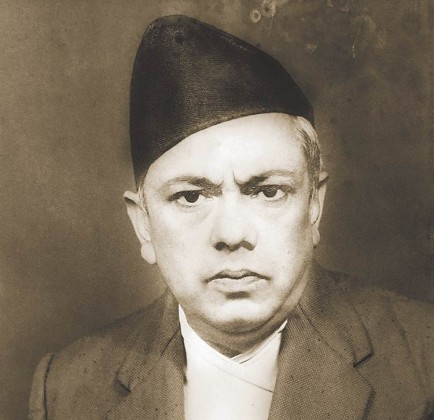
- Born: 21 May 1917; Kathmandu, Nepal
- Died: 24 October 1973 (aged 56)
- Occupations: Poet, writer
- Awards: Madan Puraskar (1962) Tribhuwan Pragya Puraskar (1973)

Gopal Prasad Rimal (Nepali: गोपाल प्रसाद रिमाल; 1917–1973) was a Nepalese poet from Kathmandu, Nepal. According to scholar Michael J. Hutt, "he is remembered as the first "revolutionary" Nepali poet and the first to reject the use of meter".

== Biography and career ==
His parents were Umakanta Rimal and Aditya Kumari Rimal. His first poem, entitled "Kavi ko Gayan" was published in a monthly magazine called Sharada.

During Rimal's adolescence, he came under the influence of revolutionaries who were aspiring to overthrow the Rana dynasty. Rimal began his career as a successful poet in 1930 and as a playwright in 1940. In 1941, after the execution of a group of political agitators, including Dashrath Chand, Rimal gathered a group of young poets to protest together by singing hymns, at Pashupatinath Temple in the mornings, and at the shrine of Shobhā Bhagavatī in the evenings.

Rimal founded a creative organization called "Praja Panchayat" to oppose the Rana rulers and was imprisoned on several occasions for his involvement in the movement. He played a pivotal role in making the 1950–52 Democratic Movement successful, but became disillusioned, and "felt betrayed by the factional strife."

His dreams of a democratic Nepal shattered, Rimal subsequently lost his mental balance and was sent to an asylum in Ranchi. Later, he was brought back to Nepal to spend the rest of his life roaming insane in the streets of Kathmandu. Rimal died in 1973.

== "Jangi Nishan Hamro" ==
Jangi Nishan Hamro or Rato Ra Chandra Surya is one of the most famous poem of Rimal.

Jungi Nishan Hamro (Nepali: "जङ्गी निसान हाम्रो")
In Devnagari
रातो र चन्द्रसुर्जे, जङ्गी निसान हाम्रो।
जिउँदो रगतसरि यो, बल्दो यो सान हाम्रो॥
हिमालझैं अटल यो, झुकेन यो कहिल्यै।
लत्रेन यो कहिल्यै, जङ्गी निसान हाम्रो॥
यो जन्मँदै जगत्मा कैयौं प्रहार आए।
साम्राज्य दुई हारे, हारेन सान हाम्रो॥
जबसम्म चन्द्रसुर्जे आकाशमा रहन्छन्।
तबसम्म हुन्छ आफ्नै रातो रगत यो हाम्रो॥
गाईसरि छन् साधु जोजो यहाँ जगत्मा।
सबको सरन बलियो, जङ्गी निसान हाम्रो॥

== Awards ==
Rimal received the Madan Puraskar in 1962. for his collection of poems 'Aama ko sapana'. He also awarded with the Tribhuwan Pragya Puraskar in 1973 A.D.

== Works ==
Gopal Prasad Rimal's "Aama ko sapana" literally 'Mother's Dream' is a popular poem in Nepal.

== Influence ==
Poet Banira Giri was "first woman to be awarded a Ph.D. by Tribhuvan University for her thesis on the poetry of Gopal Prasad Rimal."

== See also ==
- List of Nepalese poets
