= Toya Gurung =

Nepalese poet (born 1948)

- तोया गुरुङ
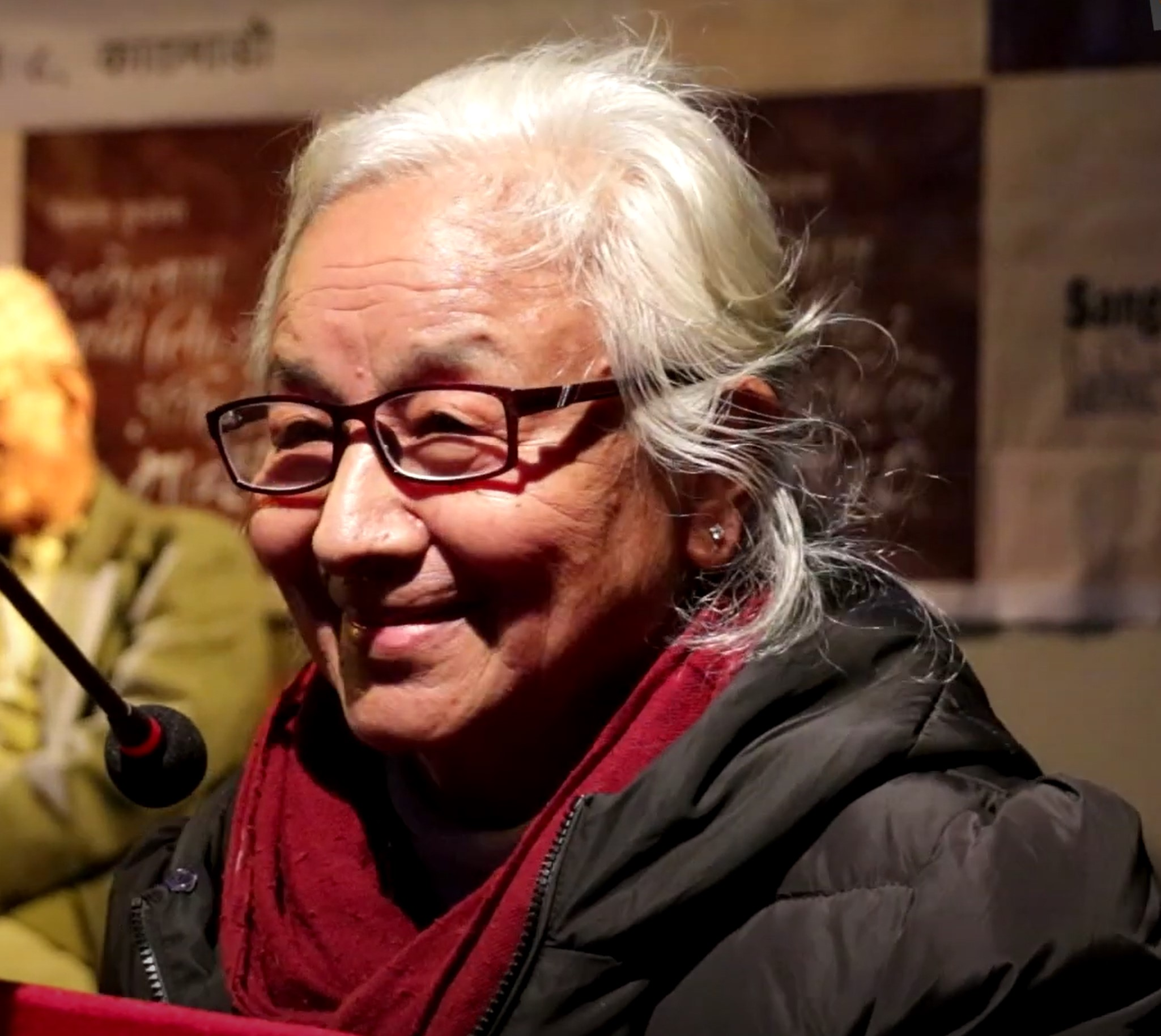
- Gurung at the launch event of Bimala Tumkhewa's book (March 2019)
- Born: 30 March 1948 (age 78); Kodari, Sindupalchowk
- Education: Morang College (MA, BL)
- Occupation: Poet
- Organization: Royal Nepal Academy
- Spouse: Kumar Ghale
- Parents: Purna Bahadur Gurung (father); Padma Kumari Gurung (mother)

Toya Gurung (Nepali: तोया गुरुङ) is a Nepali writer and poet. She served as the first female executive member of the Royal Nepal Academy. She headed the poetry department of Nepal Academy from 1994 to 2004. She has published multiple poetry collections such as Dhopee and Toya Gurungka Lama Kavita and a short story collection called Kusum. He poems have also been translated in Hindi and English.

== Biography ==
She was born on 30 March 1948 (18 Chaitra 2004 BS) in Kodari village of Sindhupalchowk district, a village near the Sino-Nepalese border as the eldest of seven children to father Purna Bahadur Gurung and mother Padma Kumari Gurung. Her father was a Royal Nepal Army Major due to which she spent her childhood in multiple districts of Nepal. She received her high school education from Amar Hindi School in Calcutta, India. She started writing poems since an early age.

She received a master's degree in arts and a degree in law. She worked in a bank as a clerk to fund her education.

She was one of the founding member of the PEN Nepal.

== Notable works ==
Poetry collections and long poems

- Suryadaha (1985)
- Dhopee (1995)
- Dewal Ghumepachhi (1999)
- Toya Gurungka Lama Kavita (2003)
- Punarawati (2013)

Short story collection

- Kusum (2011)

Memoir

- Asprishya (2017)

== Awards ==
She has received multiple awards for her works such as ‘Pratibha Puraskar’ in 1986, ‘Bethit Literary Award’ in 1988 and Ratna Shree gold medal in 1989. She was awarded with Gangadevi Chaudhari Smriti Samman in 2017.
