= Nepal Academy =

Cultural institution

Nepal Academy नेपाल प्रज्ञा–प्रतिष्ठान
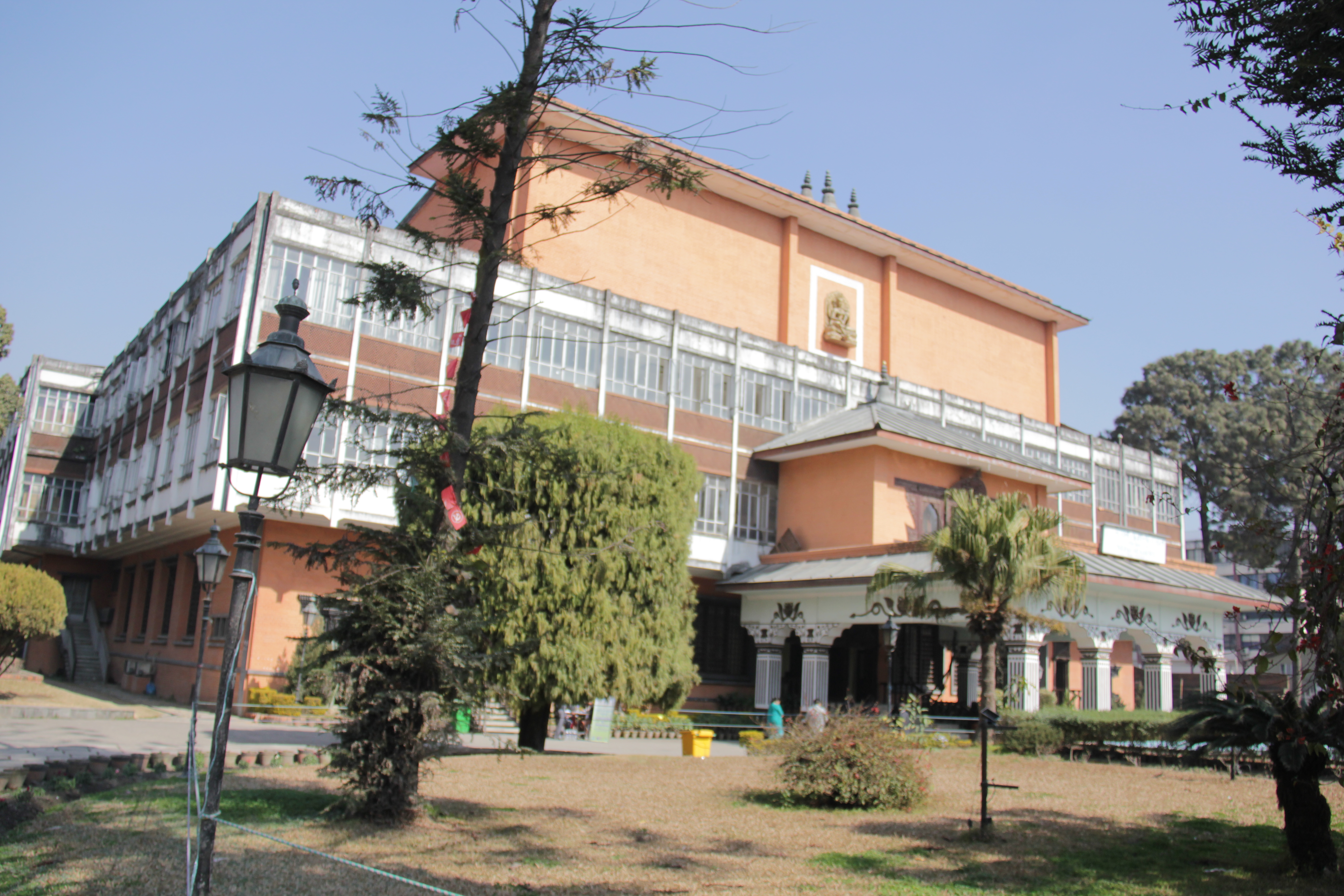
- Nepal Academy
- Formation: June 22, 1957; 68 years ago
- Type: GO
- Headquarters: Kathmandu
- Location: Nepal
- Region served: Nepal
- Official language: Nepali
- Chancellor: Mr. Bhupal Rai
- Parent organization: Ministry of Culture, Tourism and Civil Aviation, Nepal Government
- Website: https://nepalacademy.gov.np

The Nepal Academy (Nepali: नेपाल प्रज्ञा प्रतिष्ठान) formerly Royal Nepal Academy (Nepali: नेपाल राजकीय प्रज्ञा प्रतिष्ठान) is a national institution of Nepal for promotion of the languages, literature, culture, philosophy and social sciences of Nepal. The academy commissions research and aims to promote the development of cultural and intellectual endeavour by coordinating national and international activities.

A movement for a national cultural academy of Nepal began during the 20th century, with national figures calling for its establishment, including the Nepali poet Laxmi Prasad Devkota. The Academy was established in 1957 as the Nepal Academy of Literature and Art. It was later named as the Royal Nepal Academy following the passage of the Royal Nepal Academy Act 1974. After the transition of Nepal into a Democratic Federal Republic in 2008, it was renamed to the Nepal Academy, by provision of the Nepal Academy Act 2007 enacted by the Parliament of Nepal.

The academy annually organises the National Folk Music and Dance Festival, the National Cultural Festival, a Bhanu Jayanti celebration to commemorate the poet Bhanubhakta Acharya, stage performances and a national poetry competition.
