= Draupadi Avashesh =

2021 novel by Neelam Karki Niharika

- First edition
- Author: Neelam Karki Niharika
- Original title: द्रौपदी अवशेष
- Language: Nepali
- Subject: Polyandry custom
- Genre: Fiction
- Set in: Highlands of Humla district
- Published: July 16, 2021
- Publisher: Sangri-La Books
- Publication place: Nepal
- Media type: Print
- ISBN: 9789937734646
- Preceded by: 43 Katha

Draupadi Avashesh (Nepali: द्रौपदी अवशेष, lit. 'Remains of Draupadi') is a Nepali novel by Neelam Karki Niharika. It was published on July 16, 2021 by Sangri-La Books. It is the twelfth book by the writer. The book is based on a polyandry tradition in remote north-western Nepal.

Karki previously received Madan Puraskar for her 2018 novel - Yogmaya. The book was launched in Namkha rural municipality of Humla district by the chairman of the ward no. 6 - Paljjor Tamang and the local residents.

== Synopsis ==
The book is based on the polyandry tradition that is practiced by a small community in Humla district of Karnali region in Nepal. The book depicts how the custom is being lost in the modern society. The title of the book is an ode to Draupadi from Mahabharata who married five Pandava brothers. Gyaljen is one of the people living in the Himalayan region of Humla district. Because of the polyandry custom, he is supposed to marry his sister in law who is quite older than him. He is conflicted about the prospect. The novel also highlights the difficulties of people living in remote mountainous region of Nepal.

== Reception ==
Komal Phuyal in his review for Setopati called Karki as "a fine artist". Nirdosh Jiwan of Sahitya Post called this book as "one of her finest work".

== See also ==
- Cheerharan
- Yogmaya
- Nathiya
