= Amar Neupane =

Nepalese writer (born 1974)

- अमर न्यौपाने
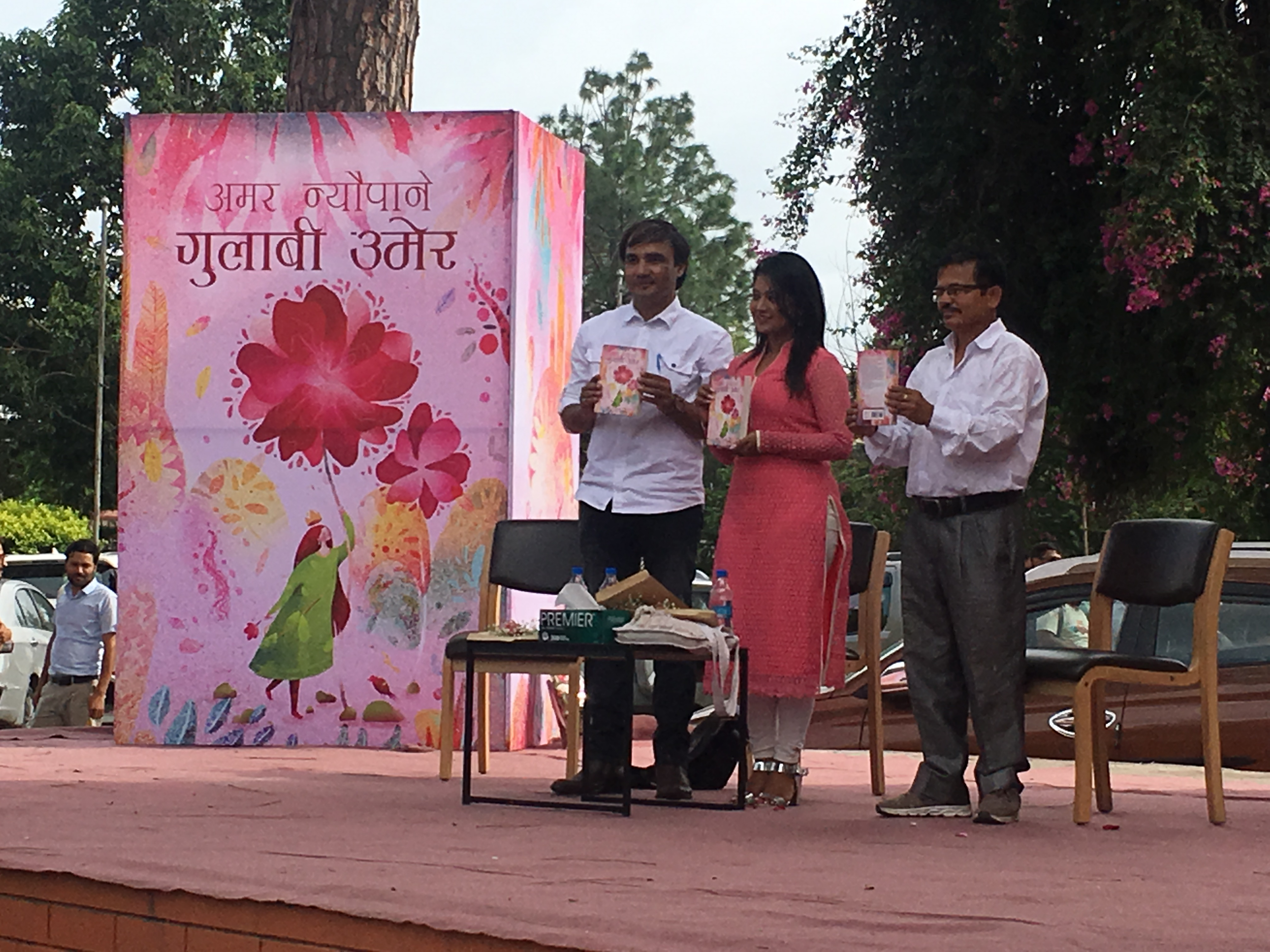
- Amar Neupane (left) with actress Keki Adhikari and writer Krishna Dharabasi, at the launch of his book Gulabi Umer
- Born: March 27, 1974 (age 51); Chitwan, Nepal
- Occupations: Writer, teacher
- Years active: 2009-present
- Known for: Nepali literature
- Notable work: Seto Dharti; Paniko Gham
- Parents: Eknath Neupane (father); Hari Maya Neupane (mother)
- Awards: Madan Puraskar, Padmashree Sahitya Puraskar

Amar Neupane (Nepali: अमर न्यौपाने) is a Nepalese writer and novelist. He is best known for his Madan Puraskar winning novel, Seto Dharti. He started his writing journey with Paniko Gham, a novel set in Nepalgunj.

== Early life ==
He was born on March 27, 1974 (Chaitra 14, 2034) as a second child to father Eknath Neupane and mother Hari Maya Neupane in Rangeela, Chitwan, Nepal.

== Literary career ==
His first novel Paniko Gham was published in 2066 BS and won the Padmashree Sahitya Puraskar award for 2066 BS. His collection of children's stories Kalilo Man (Young Heart) won the Parijat Balsahitya Pandulipi Purashkar award. His novel Seto Dharti won the Madan Puraskar—the greatest award in Nepalese literature—and also the Ramraj Panta Smriti Purashkar award. His novel Karodaun Kasturi is based on the story of what Nepali comedian Hari Bansha Acharya would have become if he hadn't recognized his talent as a comedian.

== Bibliography ==
Books	Year	Type	Awards
Paniko Gham (Sun of the water)	2010	Novel	Padmashree Sahitya Puraskar
Kalilo Man (The Young Heart)		Chlldren's stories	Parijat Balsahitya Pandulipi Purashkar
Seto Dharti (The White Earth)	2012	Novel	Madan Puraskar; Ramraj Panta Smriti Purashkar award
Karodaun Kasturi (Millions of Musk Deers)	2015	Novel	
Gulabi Umer (Pink Years)	2019	Novel	

== See also ==
- Buddhi Sagar
- Neelam Karki Niharika
- Nayan Raj Pandey
