= Sakas (novel) =

2012 Nepali novel

- Author: Jagadish Ghimire
- Language: Nepali
- Genre: Social
- Published: 2012
- Publisher: Jagdish Prathisthan
- Publication place: Nepal
- Pages: 306
- ISBN: 9789937252898

Sakas (Nepali: सकस) is a novel by Jagadish Ghimire. It was published in August 2012 by Jagadish Ghimire Pratisthan.

This plot of the novel does not just reflect the suffering of a single individual area but of Nepal as a whole. It showcases the experience of a public which is exiled and displaced without having committed any crime.

== Synopsis ==
Kumari is a girl who had been raped by her father. A man helps her go to kathmandu for education and they send her dad to prison. When she becomes a nurse she falls in love with a boy. Then she doesn't want to live in Kathmandu she goes to Janakpur.

== Characters ==
- Sharad Kumar
- Kumari Nepali
- Haribansha Adhikari (jiba)
- Sabita (jima)
- Shanti
- Devi jee
- Mr Jha
- Laal(bhaiya jee)
- Mithila
- Dinesh

== See also ==
- Antarmanko Yatra
- Phirphire
- Seto Dharti
