= Sallipir =

2016 Nepali novel

- Cover page of the book
- Author: Nayan Raj Pandey
- Original title: सल्लीपिर
- Language: Nepali
- Genre: Fiction
- Publisher: FinePrint
- Publication date: 30 April 2016
- Publication place: Nepali
- Media type: Print
- Pages: 229
- ISBN: 9789937665094
- Preceded by: Loo
- Followed by: Yaar

Sallipir (Nepali: सल्लीपिर) is a 2016 Nepali novel by Nayan Raj Pandey. It was published on 30 April 2016 by FinePrint Publication. It is the author's seventh novel. The writer's previous works, Loo and Ular had been widely successful. Unlike, the author's previous works which were set in the southern plains of midwestern region, this book is set in the Khumbu region in the Himalayan.

It took the author 28 months to complete the novel. The book was launched on April 30, 2016 jointly by the author and the poet Shyamal at the premises of Nepal Tourism Board. The book was subsequently launched in Chitwan by writers L.B Chhetri and Khagendra Sangraula.

== Synopsis ==
The book is set in the Khumbu region of Nepal. It depicts the culture, traditions and lifestyle of the Sherpa people of the region. It tells the story of three generations of a family. As with Pandey's other book, the major theme of this book is social realism. The book shows the life of Sherpa people of the mountainous region and their difficulties.

== Characters ==
- Pema, the main character of the book.
- Tshering, father of Pema
- Gyalpo, Pema's mother
- Karma, Pema's childhood friend
- Phurwa, Pema's son
- Dawa, Pema's husband

== Reception ==
The book received positive to mild responses from the critics. A review in Annapurna Post called the book "not as good as Pandey's previous works." Shankar Tiwari of Himal Khabar praised Pandey's "writing and his representation of marginalized community". Pushpa Raj Dawadi of Dhading Post praised the book as "must read" but criticized the book for its length.

== Film Adaptation ==
Filmmaker Ashok Thapa is adapting the book into a movie called Sapana Shangri-La. According to filmamker, only about 40% of the storyline of the film will be based on the book.

== See also ==
- Karnali Blues
- Jiyara
- Yaar
