= Cheerharan =

2016 novel by Neelam Karki Niharika

- Cover page
- Author: Neelam Karki Niharika
- Original title: चीरहरण
- Language: Nepali
- Genre: Mythological retelling
- Published: 2016
- Publisher: Sangri-La Books
- Publication place: Nepal
- Media type: Print (Paperback)
- Pages: 526
- Award: Padmashree Sahitya Puraskar
- ISBN: 9789937905374
- Preceded by: Arki Aaimai
- Followed by: Yogmaya

Cheerharan (Nepali: चीरहरण) is a 2016 Nepali mythological novel by Neelam Karki Niharika. It was published by Sangri-La Books and is the ninth book of the author. The book won the Padmashree Sahitya Puraskar in the year 2016.

The novel is a retelling of the Mahabharata epic. It shows the pain suffered by women in the political and social environment in the epic. Karki has presented the views of various females characters such as Satyawati, Kunti, Ambika, Ambalika, Gandhari, etc. in this book unlike the epic which is mostly male-centered.

== Synopsis ==
Cheerharan is a retelling of the infamous humiliation of Draupadi from the Sabha Parva of Mahabharata. During the game of dice, Pandavas place their wife Draupadi for the bet and loses her after which she is humiliated by the Kauravsas. The Kauravas strips her in front of the whole court and Pandavas do nothing to protect her dignity. In the end, Lord Krishna interferes to save her from humiliation. This part is one of the key moments that eventually lead to Mahabarata war.

The novel draws a parallel on the exploitation of women during that period and the modern age.

== Reception ==
The book won the Padmashree Sahitya Puraskar for the year 2072 BS. The book was also shortlisted for the prestigious Madan Puraskar for the same year but lost to Ramlal Joshi's Aina. Karki later went on to win the prize for her next novel - Yogmaya.

Rishi Ram Bhusal in his review for The Annapurna Post praised this book as "a valuable addition to Nepali literature".

== See also ==
- Yogmaya
- Dumero
- Parityakta
- Aina
