= Paniko Gham =

2010 Nepali novel by Amar Neupane

- Third edition of the book
- Author: Amar Neupane
- Original title: पानीको घाम
- Language: Nepali
- Genre: Fiction
- Set in: Nepalgunj
- Published: 2009
- Publisher: FinePrint Publication
- Publication place: Nepal
- Media type: Print
- Award: Padmashree Sahitya Puraskar, (2066 BS)
- ISBN: 9789937856362
- Followed by: Seto Dharti

Paniko Gham (Nepali: पानीको घाम, lit. 'Sun of the water') is a Nepalese novel by Amar Neupane. It was published in 2009 (2066 BS) by Pairavi Prakashan. It is the debut novel of the author.

== Synopsis ==
The novel consists of many stories set in Nepalgunj city in Mid-western region of Nepal. Neupane was posted as a teacher in Nepalgunj and there he decided to write the book. The stories represent the socio-economic lifestyle of the people of the city.

== Reception ==
The book received the Padmashree Sahitya Puraskar for the year 2066 BS (2009).

== See also ==
- Seto Dharti
- Karodaun Kasturi
- Loo
