= Chhuteka Anuhar =

2018 Memoir by Ramesh Sayan

- Cover page of the book
- Author: Ramesh Sayan
- Original title: छुटेका अनुहार
- Language: Nepali
- Genre: Memoir
- Publisher: Lipi Books
- Publication date: October 6, 2018
- Publication place: Nepal
- Media type: Print
- Pages: 247
- Award: Padmashree Sahitya Puraskar, 2075 BS (2018)
- ISBN: 9789937918671
- Preceded by: Bhagera Bhugol Bhari

Chhuteka Anuhar (Nepali: छुटेका अनुहार, lit. 'Missed faces') is a memoir by the poet Ramesh Sayan The book was published on October 6, 2018 by Lipi Books. The book contains nineteen anecdotes in essay form. The book won the Padmashree Sahitya Puraskar, 2075 BS (2018). It is the second book of the author who previously released a collection of poems called Bhagera Bhugol Bhari.

== Synopsis ==
The book contains nineteen anecdotes in essay form. The anecdotes consist of various experiences and various people whom Sayan has met in his lifetime. It consists of various stories from his life such as failing the SLC examination and working for 18 hours a day in South Korea for thirty months. The theme of the essays in the book ranges from the author's growing pains to commentary on various societal evils.

== Themes ==
The theme of the essays in the book ranges from the author's growing pains to commentary on various societal evils. The social inequality, patriarchy, discrimination on the basis of gender, class and caste are the main themes of the essays in this memoir.

== Release ==
The book is Sayan's first anthology of essays. It was launched by the poet himself and his wife, Deepa Dahal, at the Mandala theatre, Anamnagar on October 6, 2018. Poet Nawaraj Parajuli was also present during the launch ceremony.

== Awards ==
The book won the Padmashree Sahitya Puraskar for the year 2075 BS (2018). Sayan was also presented with a cash reward of Rs. 200,000. The awarded is presented annually by Khemlal-Harikala Lamichhane Samaaj Kalyan Pratisthan.

== See also ==
- Antarmanko Yatra
- Khusi
- Yaar
