= Eklo =

Nepali Book by Buddhi Sagar

- Author: Buddhisagar
- Original title: एक्लो
- Language: Nepali
- Genre: Fiction
- Published: 2022
- Publisher: FinePrint Publication
- Publication date: 2022
- Publication place: Nepal
- Preceded by: Phirphire
- Followed by: Usle Diyeko Umer

Eklo (trans. Alone) (Nepali: एक्लो) is a Nepali novel written by Buddhi Sagar and published in 2022. Eklo is a story set in the city of Kathmandu. The main character of the story is 'Shree'. The story discuss about the themes of loneliness.

== Characters ==
- Shree
- Aadi
- Surya Bahadur
- Top
- Sameera

== See also ==
- Karnali Blues
- Phirphire
- Usle Diyeko Umer
