= Nathiya (novel) =

2018 Nepali novel by Saraswati Pratikshya

- Cover page of the book
- Author: Saraswati Pratikshya
- Original title: नथिया
- Language: Nepali
- Genre: Fiction
- Published: February 3, 2018
- Publisher: Book Hill Publication
- Publication place: Nepal
- Media type: Print
- Pages: 282
- Award: Pahichan Puraskar
- ISBN: 9789937921701
- Preceded by: Bagi Sarangi

Nathiya (Nepali: नथिया, lit. 'Nose ring') is a 2018 Nepali novel by Saraswati Pratikshya. The book portrays the suffering of the Badi women of Sudurpashchim region of Nepal. It was released on 3 February 2018 by Book-Hill Publication and was shortlisted for the Madan Puraskar.

It is the first novel of the writer who had previously published three anthologies of poems. The book was launched on February 3, 2018 jointly by Uma Devi Badi, a Badi activist, writer Narayan Wagle and journalist Yashoda Timsina on the premises of Nepal Academy.

== Synopsis ==
The book is based on the life of women from Badi community from 1980 (2036 BS) to 1990 (2046 BS). The book highlights the sufferings of Badi women living in northwestern part of Dang valley. The Badi women had to resort to prostitution after the fall of Rana regime in Nepal. Pratikshya decided to write the book after seeing the Badi people protesting before Singha Durbar in the news.

== Controversy ==
A case was filed against the book by Badi council. The terms used in the book to describe Badi people were considered to be derogatory by the Badi council. The hearing of the case was conducted on April 27, 2018 in the supreme court of Nepal. The defendant, Saraswati Pratikshya pleaded that those terms were used in the book in order to highlight the misery of Badi people rather than to insult the community. The court ruled in the favor of the writer stating the terms were used to highlight the misery of the people.

== Awards ==
It was shortlisted for Madan Puraskar and won the Pahichan Puraskar in 2019. Bairagi Kainla, the chief guest of the event awarded the prize to Pratikshaya along with a cash prize of Rs. 200,200.

== See also ==
- Yogmaya
- Parityakta
- Ulaar
