= Phirphire (novel) =

2016 Nepalese novel

- Cover page of the first edition
- Author: Buddhi Sagar
- Original title: फिरफिरे
- Language: Nepali
- Genre: Novel
- Publisher: FinePrint Publications
- Publication date: 23 January 2016
- Publication place: Nepal
- Media type: Print (Paperback)
- Pages: 544
- ISBN: 9789937665018
- OCLC: 951778404
- Preceded by: Karnali Blues

Phirphire (Nepali: फिरफिरे) is a 2016 novel by Nepalese writer Buddhi Sagar. It is published by FinePrint Publication. It was launched on 23 January 2016 in Kathmandu, Nepal. Phirphire is the second novel of Buddhi Sagar.

== Reception ==
In 2016, Phirphire was nominated for Madan Puraskar, Nepal's highest literary honour, however, it lost to Ramlal Joshi's Aina.

== Characters ==
Pawan Basanta Pichku Majhi Sarbajit Master Chilgadi Juthi Aamai Jasoda Rocky Dada Munmun Jeebaram Shantiram

== See also ==
- Karnali Blues
- Seto Dharti
- Aina
