= Bhuwan Dhungana =

Nepali writer and poet

- भुवन ढुङ्गाना
- Born: Bhuwan Koirala; 2 August 1947 (age 78); Biratnagar, Morang, Nepal
- Education: MA in English
- Alma mater: Tribhuvan University
- Occupations: Writer, poet
- Notable work: Parityakta, The Thousand Rupee Note
- Spouse: Daman Nath Dhungana
- Awards: Dr. Bimala Shrestha Sahitya Puraskar

Bhuwan Dhungana (née Koirala; born 2 August 1947) is a Nepali writer and poet. She is best known for her short story The Thousand Rupee Note which has also been translated into English and Urdu. Her first novel Parityakta was published in 2020.

== Early life and education ==
She was born as Bhuwan Koirala on 2 August 1947 (18 Shrawan 2004 BS) in Biratnagar city of eastern Nepal in a political family. Although born to a political family, she was never attracted towards the world of politics.

She received her primary education from Varanasi, India and secondary education from Biratnagar. She received a Diploma in Law from Ratna Rajya Lakshmi Campus, Kathmandu. Through the Colombo Plan, she received scholarship to attend Visva-Bharati University in Santiniketan, West Bengal. In the university, she studied Manipuri dance for three years. She received a Diploma in Manipuri dance and Bengali literature in 1971. She completed her post graduate education from Tribhuvan University in 1973.

== Literary career ==
Her first writing was a poem called Shabdakosh Ko Aa Jastai published in Madhuparka magazine in 2026 BS. Her stories were published in various literary magazines such as Madhuparka, Garima and other national daily newspaper. She has written in various national dailies advocating for freedom of speech and democracy. She was one of the key persons in establishing an organization called Gunjan for women writers to meet monthly and discuss literature.

She was one of the 20 members who signed to establish the PEN Center in Kathmandu.

She worked as an editor for Siudi, a literary magazine form 1969 (2026 BS) to 1991 (2048 BS).

Dhungana once recited a poem in September 2002 in an vent organized by poet Kedar Man Vyathit and attended by politician Ganesh Man Singh. Being touched by Dhungana's poem, Singh became very emotional.

She was awarded with BP Koirala literature award instituted by BP Koirala Memorial Trust in 2016.

In 2020, she published her first novel Parityakta, which was shortlisted for the prestigious Madan Puraskar.

== Works ==
=== Short story collection ===
- Yuddhako Ghoshana Garnu Bhanda Aghi
- Dharmabimba

=== Short stories ===
- The Thousand Rupee Note
- Bhok (Hunger)

=== Novel ===
- Parityakta (2020)

== Awards and honours ==
She was awarded Dr. Bimala Mohan Sahitya Puraskar by Indra Mohan Smriti Guthi in 2020 (2077 BS) for her contribution to Nepali poetry and literature since last five decades.

In 2020 (2077 BS), her debut novel Parityakta was shortlisted for Madan Puraskar.

== See also ==
- Neelam Karki Niharika
- Banira Giri
- Parijat
