= Jhamak Ghimire =

Nepali writer

Jhamak Kumari Ghimire
- झमक कुमारी घिमिरे
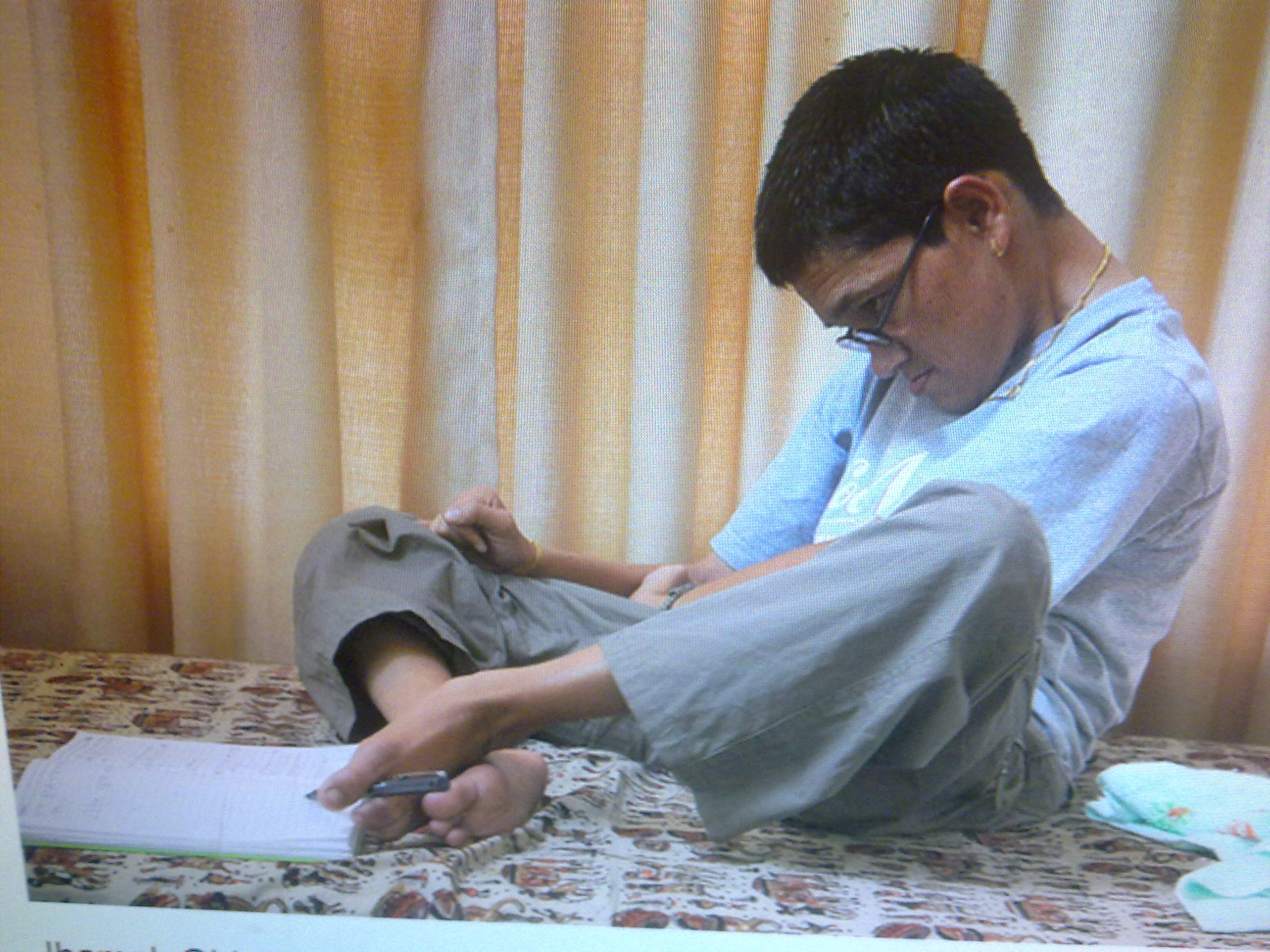
- Writing with feet
- Born: Jhamak Kumari Ghimire; July 4, 1980 (age 46); Kachide, Dhankuta, Nepal
- Occupations: Writer; columnist
- Known for: Jiwan Kada Ki Phool
- Awards: Madan Puraskar, Padmashree Sahitya Puraskar

Jhamak Kumari Ghimire (Nepali: झमक कुमारी घिमिरे; born 4 July 1980) is a Nepalese writer. She was born with cerebral palsy and writes with her left foot. She is a columnist at the Kantipur newspaper. She had been awarded the Madan Puraskar (the most prestigious award given to the writer for their contribution in Nepalese Literature) for her auto-biography Jiwan Kada Ki Phool (Is Life a Thorn or Flower). In addition, Ghimire was awarded by Kabita Ram Bal Sahitya Prativa Puraskar (2015), Aswikrit Bichar Sahitya Puraskar (2016), and Madan Purashkar (2010).

Jhamak Kumari Ghimire was born on 21 Ashad 2037 B.S (Nepali date).

== Works ==
=== Autobiography ===
- Jiwan Kada Ki Phool (Is Life Thorn or Flower)

=== Selected poetry ===
- Sankalpa (Vow)
- Aafnai Chita Agni Shikhatira (Own's Funeral Pyre Towards the Fire Apex)
- Manchhe Bhitraka Yoddhaharu (Warriors Inside Humans)
- Quaati

=== Miscellaneous ===
- Awasan Pachhiko Aagaman (Arrival After the Death)

== Awards ==
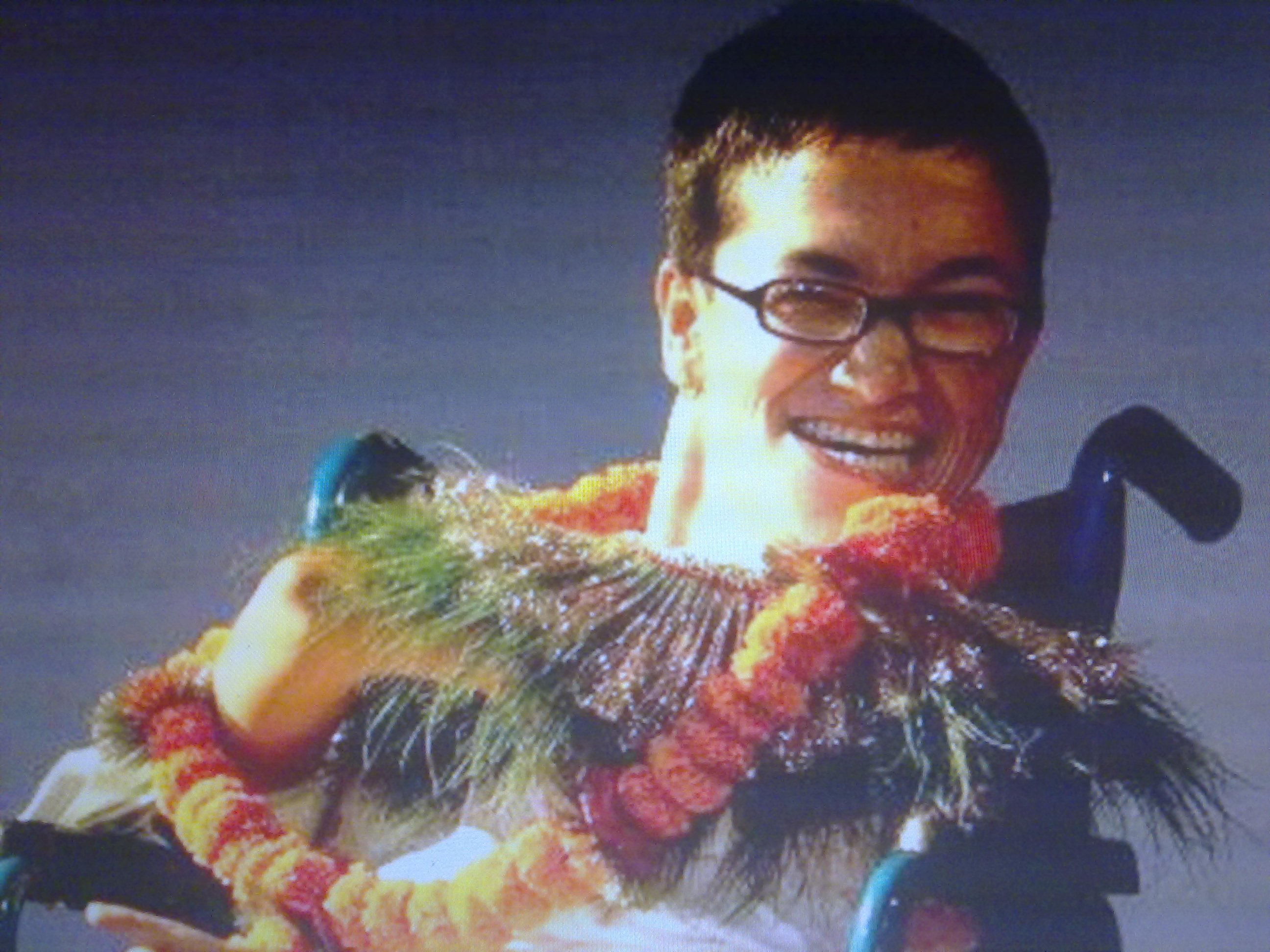
Jhamak Ghimire, awarded with the Madan Puraskar

- Madan Puraskar, 2010 for Jiwan Kada Ki Phool
- Padmashree Sahitya Puraskar, 2010 for Jiwan Kada Ki Phool
- Kabita Ram Bal Sahitya Prativa Puraskar 2015 Aswikrit Bichar Sahitya Andolan
- Aswikrit Bichar Sahitya Puraskar 2016 Aswikrit Bichar Sahitya Andolan
