= Yogmaya Neupane =

Nepalese activist (1867–1941)

- योगमाया न्यौपाने
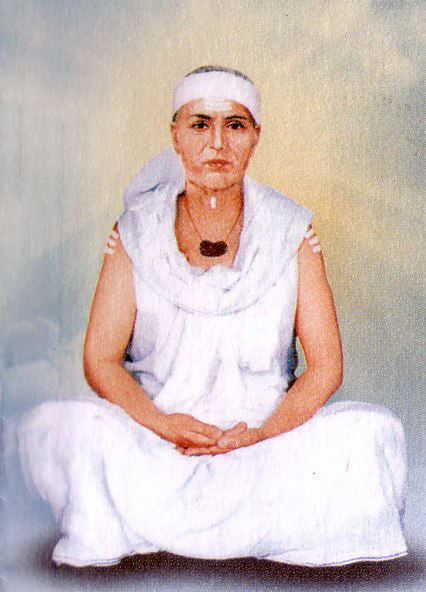
- Portrait by anonymous artist, 2017
- Born: 1867; Majhuwabesi, Nepaledada, Bhojpur, Nepal
- Died: 5 July 1941 (aged 74); Arun River, Bhojpur, Nepal

Yogmaya Neupane (Nepali: योगमाया न्यौपाने) (1867–1941) was a religious leader, women's rights activist and poet based in Bhojpur district of Nepal. Yogmaya is considered to be among the pioneer female poets in Nepal with her only published book of poems, the Sarwartha Yogbani (Nepali: सर्वार्थ योगवाणी) considered to be her most notable contribution.

Yogmaya's poems are set around the time when Nepal was ruled by the Rana regime and when India was ruled under the British Raj. Her style, characterized by the cultural and political oppression of the time was distinctly original and courageously outspoken. Despite putting a significant focus on the Hindu religious context as a religious leader, her poems and activism themes heavily revolved on female and minority rights in the region, which appealed to a lot of people around the time. In her later years, her activities were heavily monitored by the government and her works were banned by the authorities under the command of the Rana rulers and despite the persecution of her group, she is notable for opting to remain in Nepal and spending her last days around her birthplace in Eastern Nepal. It is also regarded that Yogmaya founded the first organization of Nepali women, the Nari Samiti for women's rights in 1918, which was considered to be the main lobby behind the abolition of the sati in Nepal in 1920.

Yogmaya's activism begun after she declared renunciation and returned to Nepal. With the authorities increasingly harsh towards Yogmaya and her group of supporters, as well as, unwilling to reform their brutal and corrupt approach to governance, Yogmaya and 67 of her disciples committed the biggest mass suicide (Jal-Samadhi) in Nepali history by jumping into the Arun River in 1941. In January 2016, the Nepal Government issued a postage stamp recognizing her contributions.

== Biography ==
=== Early life and family (1867–1872) ===
Yogmaya was born into a Brahmin family in Majhuwabeshi, Nepaledada at 1867. She was born as the eldest child and the only daughter from her parents, father Shrilal Upadhyaya Neupane and mother Chandrakala Neupane, among three children.

According to the prevalent Brahmin customs of the period, Yogmaya was married off by her parents to a boy named Ishwar Koirala, when she was just 7 years old. However, throughout her stay with her in-laws, she had a hard time adjusting in the home, and it's believed that she was a victim of domestic violence. Around her mid-teen years, Yogmaya decided to flee from the abusive house and return to her maternal home. However, Yogmaya wasn't easily welcomed at home by her father and her community, and they instead insisted on her returning to her in-laws. But with the in-laws refusing to accept her back in their home, her father hesitatingly decided to let her stay at his house.

There are two contrasting assumptions about the fate of Yogmaya's husband Ishwar Koirala. The popularly narrated versions mention him dying at age 10 and Yogmaya consequently being a child widow, attributing her widowed status to be the reason behind her in-law's barrage of abuses. However, some modern literature around Yogmaya state that she was actually never a child widow and her husband instead married another woman after Yogmaya escaped the home.

=== Migration to Assam and re-marriage (1872–1917) ===
In her mid-teen years, despite being a single woman in the highly conservative and repressive Brahmin society of the time, Yogmaya secretly developed a relationship with a neighborhood Brahmin boy with the surname Kandel (name unidentified). Yogmaya decided to flee from her home at Bhojpur and she later married her lover at Assam. After over a decade of being together, its believed that Yogmaya separated from her second husband and left with her daughter. Some sources mention her second husband dying, while others mention the two actually separating in good terms. Some literature mention her marrying a third husband with the surname Dotel after the demise of her second husband. Historians have disputed about whether Yogmaya gave birth to two daughters or one, but the existence of Nainakala Neupane as her daughter has been recorded.

=== Renunciation and return to Nepal (1917) ===
After deciding that she had enough of marriages and the worldly ways, Yogmaya decided to adopt a life of renunciation and live the rest of her life as an ascetic. While it was fairly common for males to become ascetics in the Hindu society during the time, it was very rare for females being so. Yogmaya then returned to Nepal with her daughter Nainakala to her home village at Majhuwabesi and handed over daughter Nainakala to her brother Agnidhar Neupane and sister-in-law Ganga. She hence gave up all her responsibilities and fully assumed the life of an ascetic. It was during this period that Yogmaya began composing her religious poems. Analysis of her earlier themes has pointed out scholars to assume that Yogmaya was heavily influenced by the principles of reformist Hindu leader Dayananda Saraswati, who had gained immense popularity across India when Yogmaya resided in Assam.

=== Ascetic journey within Nepal (1917–1918) ===
Yogmaya later commenced her ascetic journey across different parts of Nepal. During her journey she came in contact with many renowned religious leaders, including Swargadwari Mahaprabhu Abhayananda Second, who was highly appreciative of her devotion and thus guided her with the Yogic spiritual education under the Joshmani saint tradition. After her journey, Yogmaya decided to vigorously practice her meditative Sadhana by returning to her home village.

=== Return to Majhuwabesi, popularity of activism and opposition of local feudal lords (1918–1930) ===
Yogmaya practiced some extremely difficult meditation techniques during her Sadhana, including meditating for days on end near fire during summers and then without thickly covered clothes inside cold caves during winters. Sometimes she would even meditate while fasting and only drinking water for several weeks. At other times, she would meet with people and her relatives to whom she would recite her poems. Unlike anything the people in Majhuwabesi had ever heard or known, her poems influenced many locals and her following steadily began to grow. One of her disciples, Bhim Bahadur Basnet later constructed a hut for Yogmaya and also compiled her poems and later published them from Sikkim.

The tragedies and discrimination faced by Yogmaya in her pre-ascetic life heavily defined her outlook on the injustices present in the Nepali Hindu society. Despite being a follower and preacher of Hindu spiritual philosophy, she felt that the patriarchal society around the time was unfairly discriminatory towards women and in the case of Nepal, towards the lower economic class as well. Her poems attempted to make the masses around Bhojpur aware of such underlying discrimination, which resonated with large number of locals. Following the publication of her poems, people from as far away as Darjeeling and Kathmandu began to become her disciples.

Although Yogmaya's teachings easily influenced many underprivileged and politically isolated masses, many local feudalistic landlords belonging to the Basnet lineage, as well as, local people close to the central administrators in Kathmandu considered the ascetic and her followers a threat to their patriarchal privileges and vehemently started opposing her. Ultimately, her activism and popularity gained the attention of the administrators of the brutal Rana Regime as well.

=== Contact with the state (1930–1936) ===
Yogmaya believed that the administration had become extremely corrupt and had added to misery of the common people by not adhering to the Dharma, despite propagating to the public that they adhered to the Hindu religious code. She also openly criticized the bureaucrats who were thriving from bribery and denying people even the basic rights through her poems. With a view to promote and preach her ideas as well convince the administrators in Kathmandu to change their discriminatory and corrupt policies Yogmaya sent one of her disciples Premnarayan Bhandari to Kathmandu in 1931, who later began to be known popularly by the masses in Kathmandu as Hareram Prabhu. The then Prime Minister of Nepal, Juddha Shumsher Rana also decided to meet Bhandari following which he gave a spoken assurance to adhere to the holy vow of truth and sent him to give the message to Yogmaya. However, the administrators didn't reform any of their brutal and corrupt techniques in the next four years. Dejected by the attitude of the rulers in Kathmandu, Yogmaya once again sent Bhandari to Kathmandu in 1936 and then later that year the leader herself came to Kathmandu with her daughter. She was welcomed by Juddha Shumsher during her visit there, where he reportedly asked what she wanted and in response Yogmaya replied 'the alms of the holy order of truth and justice' (in Nepali: सत्य धर्मको भिक्षा). The prime minister gave her his assurance again, but didn't implement any concrete reform as her group had expected. Then, before leaving the Kathmandu Valley, Yogmaya handed a 24-point appeal to the prime minister detailing the reforms she and her followers wanted to see in the country. This alarmed Juddha Shumsher and his followers, who began seeing Yogmaya as a threat to their political establishment and so made special preparations to send her back to Bhojpur that year.

=== Dissatisfaction with the state and threat of mass suicide on pyre (1936–1939) ===
Dissent against Rana Regime had begun to increase in the late 1930s, primarily influenced by the Freedom Movement in India. As a response, the then government resorted to using more brutal techniques against dissidents. The reforms demanded by Yogmaya and her followers were repeatedly ignored by the state and the activities of her group was consistently being monitored. In 1935, Yogmaya began publicly opposing the corrupt and brutal administration. She declared that it was time to establish a new era by destroying the injustices, superstitions and corrupt practices that had taken hold of the Nepali society. She further declared that she didn't wish to be entangled in the changing era as she was already nearing salvation and she thus was soon willfully going to sacrifice herself in the name of god.

In the pretext of Juddha Shumser not fulfilling his assurances, Yogmaya made a plan to sacrifice herself by sitting on a giant pyre along with 240 willful disciples in a ritual called the Agni Samadhi and thus commanded her followers to post a public appeal to the common people for any kind of alms they could give to her group by the Kartik Shukla Purnima. She also sent personal appeals for alms to Madhav Shumsher, the then head administrator of Dhankuta district and Juddha Shumser.

With the administrators not paying heed to her appeal yet again, Yogmaya set the date for her sacrifice to November 12, 1938 and publicly began making preparations for the same.

=== Interference by the state and arrest of her followers (1939–1941) ===
Fearing a mass reprisal if the mass sacrifice was allowed to happen, Juddha Shumser ordered the disruption of the event by deploying around 500 security personnel to the event venue on November 11, following which 11 male disciples were jailed at Dhankuta while most female participants of the disrupted agni samadhi ritual, including Yogmaya and Nainakala were kept in close arrest in the Radhakrishna Temple at Bhojpur. The administrators released the female members from detention after three months, while most of the male followers were released from jail three years later in April 1941.

=== Mass suicide (Jal Samadhi) (1941) ===
After the release of all her disciples Yogmaya decided to continue with her self-sacrificing plans, but this time she ordered to keep the plans an in-group secret. She set the new date of the event to July 5, 1941, which was the day of the holy Harisayani Ekadasi and personally allowed only a select group of disciples to join in with her. The religious ritual for the Jal Samadhi began on the night of July 4, 1941 and in the morning of July 5 at around 4AM, Yogmaya led the ritualistic mass suicide by climbing on a rock placing a plate with firelit oil lamps on her head at the banks of the raging Arun River. After Yogmaya, 65 of her disciples then jumped in the river in succession on that day and the next day two more of her disciples followed suit. Ultimately, the total death count from the event stood at 68.

== Legacy ==
Sample of official stamp published by the Nepal Government for use in public domain in 2017.

Yogmaya and her daughter Nainakala were illiterate. Her poems were compiled and published by her literate disciples. In fact, the Yogbani is considered to be a small part of her poem collections, which she continued to compose until the year of her Jal Samadhi.

News and materials on Yogmaya and the mass suicide were aggressively censored by the Rana Regime until they were overthrown in 1951. However, even during the first multi-party democracy era (1951–1960) and the Panchayat Era (1960–1990), mention about Yogmaya's activities were generally discouraged by the state. Yet, her disciples, who were scattered around Bhojpur, Khotang and Sankhuwasabha continued the tradition locally through the 1990s. Some of Yogmaya's disciples, mostly female, also lived in the Manakamana Temple in Tumlingtar.

After travel restrictions for foreign visitors to Nepal were gradually lifted around the Panchayat Era, scholars from outside Nepal also began pursuing Yogmaya. After the 1980s, notable Western scholars, including Barbara Nimri Aziz and Michael Hutt researched and published their literary works based on Yogmaya.

Topics on Yogmaya have been also included in the curriculum in specific Social Science based disciplines in different universities in Nepal including Sociology, Anthropology and Women's Studies.

A local organization has also been formed in Bhojpur by relatives and locals of Yogmaya Neupane called the ‘Yogamaya Shakti Pith Tapobhumi Bikash Tatha Vikas Sanstha’, to promote her work and activities as well as preserve the places where Yogmaya spent a significant time during her ascetic life around Nepaledada and Dingla.

On November 16, 2016, the Nepal Government issued a postal stamp in recognition of her contributions to the history of Nepal. In 2025 , a government-initiated institution called Yogmaga Ayurveda University dedicated to preserving and promoting Himalayan healing traditions, including Ayurveda, Sowa-rigpa, and yoga.

The Nepali novelist Neelam Karki Niharika was awarded the top prize in the 2018 edition of the Madan Puraskar for her biographical novel Yogmaya. Nepal-based playwright Tanka Chaulagain later adopted the storyline of the book to create a theater play which was initially screened at Shilpee Theater in Kathmandu in June 2019.
