= Yaar (book) =

2018 Nepali autobiography by Nayan Raj Pandey

- Cover page of the book
- Author: Nayan Raj Pandey
- Original title: यार
- Language: Nepali
- Genre: Autobiography, Memoir
- Publisher: FinePrint Publication
- Publication date: January 13, 2018
- Publication place: Nepal
- Media type: Print (Hardcover)
- Pages: 240
- ISBN: 9789937665377
- Preceded by: Sallipir
- Followed by: Jiyara

Yaar (Nepali: यार, lit. 'friends') is an autobiographical book by Nepali writer Nayan Raj Pandey. It is the first autobiographical work of the writer whose previous books, Loo and Ulaar have been widely popular among Nepali readers. The book was published on January 13, 2018 by FinePrint Publication. The author had been prominent in Nepali literature field for three decades at the time of publication of the book.

== Background ==
The book depicts the journey of the author from his youthful days to being an established Nepali writer. The book chronicles the memories of his days in media and literature. The book is dedicated to his wife and his friends.

== Release ==
The book was launched on the premises of Nepal Academy, Kamaladi and was hosted by Shivani Singh Tharu.

== Award ==
The book won the Padmashree Sahitya Puraskar for the year 2074 BS (2018). It was also shortlisted for the prestigious Madan Puraskar for the same year.

== See also ==
- Sallipir
- Khusi
- Jiwan Kada Ki Phool
- Antarmanko Yatra
- Singha Durbarko Ghumne Mech
