= Daman Nath Dhungana =

Nepali politician (1940 or 1941 – 2024)

Honourable Daman Nath Dhungana
- दमन नाथ ढुंगाना

2nd Speaker of the House of Representatives
- In office 23 June 1991 – 1 October 1994
- Monarch: Birendra
- Preceded by: Krishna Prasad Bhattarai (1960)
- Succeeded by: Ram Chandra Paudel

Personal details
- Born: 15 January 1942
- Died: 17 November 2024 (aged 83) Baneshwor, Kathmandu, Nepal
- Party: People's Progressive Party (Nepal) (2021–2024)
- Other political affiliations: Nepali Congress(?–2021)
- Spouse: Bhuwan Dhungana

Daman Nath Dhungana (1940 or 1941 – 17 November 2024) was a Nepali politician who was the Speaker of the House of Representatives from 1991 to 1994. He played an instrumental role during the Nepal peace process between 2003 and 2009. His role as the first house speaker after the establishment of constitutional monarchy, in 1990, is considered exemplary. He returned to active politics in 2017 after a gap of 23 years. He was known for his vocal criticisms of the conduct of parliamentarians, including House Speaker and committee chairs, for what he considered, breaks from proper procedures and best practices.

== Life and career ==
Dhungana was a founder and executive member of Amnesty International. He also served as the president of the Supreme Court Bar Association in 1984. He was the first House Speaker after the democratic revolution, in 1990. Dhungana, in his role as House Speaker, is thought to have set the precedent for allowing the opposition leader to address the parliament before an address from the Prime minister, in accordance with common international practice. He is remembered as a non-partisan Speaker.

After losing the parliamentary elections in 1994, he had effectively retired from partisan politics and developed a reputation as a civil society member. Dhungana was an important facilitator and mediator between the then government and the Nepal Maoist Party during the peace process, along with Padma Ratna Tuladhar. He was the observer, negotiator and advisor of Nepal's peace process from 2003 to 2009. Although always associated with Nepali Congress, he was said to be "too close" to the Maoists, at one time during the peace process. In 2009, he proposed to create a high-level steering committee to strengthen pro-peace lobbies in all parties, a proposal later endorsed by the then Prime minister Madhav Kumar Nepal.

He made a surprise comeback to active politics in 2017 after a gap of 23 years. He was fielded by Nepali Congress in Bhaktapur-2 constituency, against the common candidate of CPN UML and CPN (Maoist Center), Mahesh Basnet, in the first past the post category of 2017 Nepal legislative elections.

In January 2019, Dhungana alleged that Speaker Krishna Bahadur Mahara had wrongfully declared the National Medical Education Bill passed, and therefore, the bill should be reintroduced to the house. Speaker Mahara had declared that the majority of parliamentarians had said "nay" to the section under vote and therefore it had been passed. Dhungana argued that the records would show the Speaker had declared the bill passed despite a "nay" from the majority and there was no provision to correct the records for a slip of the tongue. On 1 February 2019, Dr. Govinda KC broke his 16th hunger strike accepting juice from Dhungana and former Chief Justice Sushila Karki. Dhungana opposed the move by State Affairs and Good Governance Committee of the House of Representatives to bar the media from covering its meetings in May 2019.

Dhungana died in Baneshwor, Kathmandu, Nepal on 17 November 2024, aged 83.
