= Kara (novel) =

2019 novel by Sushila Karki

- Cover page
- Author: Sushila Karki
- Original title: कारा
- Language: Nepali
- Subjects: Female prisoners
- Genre: Novel
- Published: December 2019
- Publisher: Kitab Publishers
- Publication place: Nepal
- Media type: Print (Paperback)
- Pages: 232
- ISBN: 9789937068062
- Preceded by: Nyaya

Kara (Nepali: कारा, lit. 'Prison') is a Nepali-language novel by Sushila Karki. It was published on December 9, 2019 by Kitab Publishers. Karki is the first female Chief Justice of Nepal. It is the second book of the author who previously published an autobiography - Nyaya. The novel is inspired by Karki's own jail time experience during 1990s. The book was launched in a ceremony on the premises of Nepal Academy by former Police Chief Ramesh Kharel and Chief Justice Sapana Malla.

== Synopsis ==
The novel is the story of female prisoners. Karki herself was imprisoned during the Panchayat regime in the 1990s. The major theme of the book is about the bondage of the women in the society. It shows the discrimination that a woman has to face in the society.

== Reception ==
The book received mild responses from the critics. Chief justice Sapana Malla called the book as "a reality of Nepalese society" during the launch event of the book. Laxmi Basnet in her review for Himal Khabar criticized the book for its "linguistic weakness". Phanindra Sangram called the book "a 'fresh content' for Nepalese readers despite its certain drawbacks" for his review for Koseli (weekly) of Kantipur newspaper.

== See also ==
- Nyaya
- Shirishko Phool
- Parityakta
