= Yogmaya (novel) =

2018 Nepali novel by Neelam Karki Niharika

- Cover page of the book
- Author: Neelam Karki Niharika
- Original title: योगमाया
- Language: Nepali
- Genre: Historical
- Publisher: Sangri-La Books
- Publication date: 2018
- Publication place: Nepal
- Media type: Print (Paperback)
- Pages: 503
- Awards: Madan Puraskar, 2074
- ISBN: 9789937708197
- Preceded by: Cheerharan
- Followed by: 43 Katha

Yogmaya (Nepali: योगमाया) is a historical novel by Neelam Karki Niharika. This book was published on February 17, 2018, by Sangri-La books. It won the Madan Puraskar, 2074 B.S. This book is based on the life of the activist Yogmaya Neupane. This novel provides an overall understanding of the women's rights movement in Nepal.

== Synopsis ==
Yogmaya is based on the life of female protagonist Yogmaya Neupane (1860-1941), a religious leader and women rights activists born in Bhojpur, who fought against the autocratic Rana regime.

== Reception ==
The book won the Madan Puraskar for the year 2074 BS (April 2017 - April 2018). The book was shortlisted along Kairan by Dhruba Satya Pariyar, Nathiya by Saraswoti Pratikshya, Paathshala by Tirtha Gurung, Bhuyan by Yagyasha, Yaar by Nayanraj Pandey, Lumbini Gaun by Raj Manglak and Himali Darshan by Mohan Baidya.

== Adaptations ==
The book was adapted into a play by Tanka Chaulagain in 2019. Popular Nepali actress Mithila Sharma played the lead role in the play.

== See also ==
- Shirishko Phool
- Parityakta
- Kumari Prashnaharu
- Khalangama Hamala
