= Loo (novel) =

2012 Nepali novel

- Cover page of the 1st edition
- Author: Nayan Raj Pandey
- Original title: लू
- Language: Nepali
- Genre: Fiction
- Set in: Banke district, Nepal
- Publisher: Sangri~La Books, FinePrint Publication
- Publication date: 2012
- Publication place: Nepal
- Media type: Print (Paperback)
- ISBN: 9789937853828
- Followed by: Ghamkiri
- Website: Official Publisher's site

Loo (Nepali: लू, lit. 'fast moving hot westerly wind') is a 2012 Nepali novel by Nayan Raj Pandey. It is the fifth novel of the writer and was published in 2012 by Sangri~La Publication. The book was critically acclaimed and became a bestseller.

The book is set in a village near Indo-Nepalese border in western Nepal. The book includes the writer's own experience growing up in Nepalgunj. According to writer, the main character Elaiya is a combination of people, he knew growing up. The book was reprinted by FinePrint Publication in 2015.

== Synopsis ==
The book is set in a fictional village called Pattharpuruwa in Banke district of Nepal near the Indian border. The book shows the strange and everyday events of the village. Since, the village is located near Indian border, far from the capital city, the village is neglected by the central Nepalese government and troubled by the Sashastra Seema Bal, the Indian border guarding force. The village is shown being continuously being encroached by the Indian side. The major theme of this book is social realism. The book shows the socio-economic conditions of people in Madesh region of Nepal. The book shows how the people living in the region are neglected by Nepalese government.

== Characters ==
- Elaiya, the main protagonist
- Elaiya's father
- Elaiya's mother
- Elaiya's step mother
- Tutte Pandit, a priest
- Radiolal, a friend of Elaiya
- Bajrangi, a friend of Elaiya
- Karim, Nushrat's love interest
- Maheshar Kaka
- Chameli, Radiolal's wife
- Nushrat, Elaiya's love interest
- Munni
- Kabita
- Brijalala

== Translation and adaptations ==
The English translation of the book is to be released soon.

The book was adapted into a play by Sarita Shah in 2017. The play was presented by Tandav theatre and was staged in Mandala theatre.

== See also ==
- Sallipir
- Ular
- Seto Dharati
