= Aswikrit Sahitya Andolan =

Nepali dissident literary movement

The Aswikrit Sahitya Andolan (Nepali: अस्वीकृत साहित्य आन्दोलन, lit. 'Rejected Literary Movement') is a dissident literary movement, formed in 1970 by a group of writers in Nepal under the name of Aswikrit Jamat (Rejected Generation).

== History ==
In 1970s, Nepal was under the reign of a rigid monarchical authoritarian regime known as the panchayat system (defined as a party-less system). No progressive thoughts were allowed in literary works, nor was any printed material or professional group formation allowed without the government sanction during this period. Progressive writers were suppressed and subjugated by the government and its vigilant seekers. Thus they rebelled pronouncing themselves as Aswikrit Jamat i.e. rejectionists; not merely "rejected generation" but "rejecters" of all imposed authoritarian, undemocratic and unrealistic values by the rigid regime and old traditions.

== Objective ==
In the words of Dr. Kavitaram Shrestha, who is one of the initiators of the movement, the mission of the Aswikrit Movement is to - fight against established regressive orthodox legacies that hinder the substantial progression of a time, value and society, and at the same time direct the energies for the progression for the multi-communal benefits ensuring equal opportunities for the weak and marginalized thoughts, concepts, values, people and communities. It even fights its own legacies and established values for the refinements. He says ‘Aswikrit Literature is the literature of opposition’.

== Aswikrit Jamat ==
The rebellious Aswikrit Jamat (the Rejectionists) were numbered with 16 writers. They were: Kavitaram Shrestha, Nepal Bhushan Neupane, Shailendra Sakar, Puskar Lohani, Bhau Panthi, Saket Bihari Thakur, Prakash Premi, Anjir Pradhan, Kanakdwip BaAa, Jagat Ranjan, Mohan Singh Thapa, Prem Narayan Premi, Indra Rajbhandari, Navin Prakash Jung Shah, Bishnulal Shrestha and Kashinath Tamot. Later, the number of rebels was not increased as the group perceived that the rebellion had to be through their writings but not with their name itself. Besides, one could reveal his/her unity through any forms of radical campaign.

The rebellious writers started this movement with an unregistered literary journal Sanjeevani, edited by Kavitaram Shrestha and Nepal Bhushan Neupane. Later three more casual unregistered journals also joined the movement. They were: Mantra-5 (edited by Kavitaram Shrestha and Shailendra Sakar), Resha-4 (edited by Anjir Pradhan Pidit), Kshitij (edited by Mohan Singh Thapa). In 1974, the Aswikrits with other prominent protestors had also organized a symbolic protest with the Boot-polish Campaign in New Road of Kathmandu still under the tyrant monarchical regime of Panchayet System.

The movement was active for 4 years before apparently disbanding. However, the individuals kept on writing their rebellious articles for years without using the name of the Aswikrit movement. Only Kavitaram Shrestha presented all of his books as a part of the movement all the time.

== Aswikrit Literary award ==
In 1997, Dr. Kavitaram Shrestha कविताराम श्रेष्ठ later announced a literary award called the Aswikrit Bichar-sahitya Puraskar, to reward those rejectionists who were rejected by the power and authority. Kavitaram believes that all traits in the power subjugate rivals. If rivals are subdued, progress stops in the society. So rebellions should be empowered by all means for the progress of the society. This award is given to one radical littérateur every year. For its continuity Kavitaram Shrestha established a trust named Aswikrit Bichar-sahitya Puraskar Guthi donating the entire earnings from his literary works (Books of Kavitaram)as well as cash awards obtained in the past and even in future to come.

This conceptual literary award was established in order to help sustainability and promotion of Aswikrit Andolan in Nepal, helping rejected Nepali writers that stand in opposition with their Aswikrit creative literatures, promoting revolts for creative changes against all values that exploits deprived population for all times and places.

== Related groups ==
Kavitaram Shrestha (Prof. Dr. Kavitaram Shrestha) has declared four more sister movements with his own sponsorship. They are:

- Kavitaram Bal-sahitya Pravardhan Anusthan (Kavitaram Children's Literature Venture) It is founded by Prof. Dr. Kavitaram Shrestha with his royalties earned from the literary works and awards in 2054 BS, 1997 AD with Objectives to lay bricks in the promotion of the children's literature in Nepal by inspiring promoters. It is organized by Balmanch Nepal (Children's Forum, Nepal). Every year three categories of honors and awards are being provided to inspire the promotion activities in the field of children's literature in Nepal. The activities are (I) Kavitaram Bal Sahitya Prabardhan Samman (Kavitaram Children's Literature Promotion Honor) together with cash amount of Rs. 5000.00 to one distinguished pioneer personality who has contributed immensely in the promotion of children's literature in Nepal; (II) Kavitaram Bal Sahitya Prabardhan Kadar Patra (Kavitaram Children's Literature Promotion Appreciation Letter) to one distinguished organization contributing immensely in the promotion of children's literature in Nepal; and (III) Kavitaram Bal Sahaitya Pratibha Puraskar (Kavitaram Children's Literature Talent Award) together with books equivalent to Rs. 2000.00 to one young talent literary personality.
- Manmaya Sunaulo Smiriti Sanskrit Pravardhan Anusthan (Manamaya Sunaulo Memorial Nepalese Cultural Promotion Venture)
- Antar-rastriya Nepali Bal-sahitya Pravardhan Sanjal (International Nepalese Children's Literature Promotion Network)
- Nanda Smriti Janajati Chhatra-chhatra Utthan Kosh (Nanda Suppressed-class Students Development Fund): It is organized by Laligurash English School, Okhaldhunga institutionalized by Bidyodaya Cooperative Pvt. Ltd.) in 2047. Founder Dr Kavitaram Shrestha donated the seed money in commemoration of his Late father Mr. Nandaram Shrestha with the entire money acquired as salary and allowances from the appointment of Nepal Government's Political Appointment i.e. Vice-president of Committee for the Development of Ethnic Nationalities, Ministry of Local Development. This was established to help educate economically low class people in quality school in honor of his father's spirit to the love of education as well as his inclusive broadness towards suppressed communities.
