= Saraswati Pratikshya =

Nepalese writer

- सरस्वती प्रतीक्षा
- Born: Saraswati Lalchan; Pokhara, Nepal
- Education: Master's Degree in Economics
- Alma mater: Tribhuvan University
- Occupations: Poet; writer; activist
- Notable work: Nathiya
- Children: 1
- Awards: Pahichan Puraskar (2019)

Saraswati Pratikshya (Nepali: सरस्वती प्रतीक्षा) is a writer known for her novel Nathiya published in 2018. Before writing the novel, she had published three poetry books: Yadhyapi Prashnaharu (collection of poems, 2005), Bimbaharuko Kathaghara (Collection of poems, 2009) and Bagi Sarangi (collection of poems, 2012).

Her novel Nathiya was about the Badi people. It was shortlisted for Madan Puraskar and won the Pachichan Puraskar (Identity Award) in 2019.

== Personal life ==
Saraswati Pratikshya was born to a Thakali family. With her biological parents' consent, she was adopted by Nepalese writer Sarubhakta in 1998. She is divorced and lives with her son.

== Bibliography ==
- Yadhyapi Prashnaharu (collection of poems, 2005)
- Bimbaharuko Kathaghara (collection of poems, 2009)
- Bagi Sarangi (collection of poems, 2012)
- Nathiya (novel, 2018)

== Prizes and honors ==
- Ganesh and Hastakumari Memorial Award, 2009
- Bhupi Memorial Award, 2011
- Gunzan Talent Award, 2012
- Honor from Dhading Literary Society, 2006
- Samata Poetic Honor, 2009
- Janani Literary Award, 2018
- Lions Literary Award, 2019
- Pachichan Puraskar (Identity Award, 2019)
