= Nyaya (book) =

2018 autobiography by Sushila Karki

- Cover page
- Author: Sushila Karki
- Original title: न्याय
- Language: Nepali
- Genre: Autobiography
- Published: September 28, 2018
- Publisher: Book Hill Publications
- Publication place: Nepal
- Media type: Print (Paperback)
- Pages: 360
- ISBN: 9789937921787
- Followed by: Kara

Nyaya (Nepali: न्याय, lit. 'Justice') is a 2018 autobiography by Sushila Karki. It was published on September 28, 2018, by Book Hill Publications. Karki is the first female Chief Justice of Nepal. It is the first book by this author. She wrote the book after the end of her term on the bench.

== Synopsis ==
The book depicts the journey of the writer to be the first female Chief Justice of Nepal. Karki served for 30 years in the law profession and eight years as a judge. She writes about her growing up years and her memories of the college life. The book describes the various political upheavals in Nepal and Karki's involvement in those activities and revolutions. The book also contains the various struggles she had to face while she was the Chief Justice of the Supreme Court of Nepal and the various landmark decisions she delivered. The book also contains accounts of the various political pressures Karki had to endure during her term.

== Reception ==
During the launch event, Senior Advocate Surendra Bhandari described the book as a "viewing glass to how the judiciary works in Nepal". Dr. Govinda K.C. praised the book as "an honest portrayal of the working of supreme court of Nepal". Kumar Khadka in his review for Onlinekhabar news portal however slated the biography as "manufactured".

== See also ==
- Singha Durbarko Ghumne Mech
- Hisila: From Revolutionary to First Lady
- Khalangama Hamala
