= Badi people =

Badi/Vadi
बादी/वादी

Regions with significant populations
- Nepal: 38,603 (0.1% of Nepal's population)

Languages
- Parse Kura, Nepali language (Khas kura)

Religion
- Hinduism 96% (2011), Christianity 4% (2011)

Related ethnic groups
- Khas people, Damai, Sarki, Kami, Gandarbha/Gaine

Badi (Nepali: बादी) is a Hill Dalit community in Nepal. The 1854 Nepalese Muluki Ain (Legal Code) categorized Badi in the "Impure and Untouchable (Pani Na Chalne)" category. Badi are categorized under "Hill Dalit" among the 9 broad social groups, along with Damai, Sarki, Kami and Gaine by the Government of Nepal. 'Badi' means Vadyabadak, one who plays musical instruments, in Sanskrit. They are Indigenous people of Western Nepal They celebrate their "bhad sakrati" their main festival. They support their impoverished families through daily wages and fishing, woodcutting and making musical instruments.

Due to many caste-based discriminations in Nepal, the government of Nepal legally abolished the caste-system and criminalized any caste-based discrimination, including "untouchability" (the ostracism of a specific caste) - in the year 1963 A.D. With Nepal's step towards freedom and equality, Nepal, previously ruled by a Hindu monarchy was a Hindu nation which has now become a secular state, and on 28 May 2008, it was declared a republic, ending it as the Hindu kingdom with its caste-based discriminations and the untouchability roots.

== History ==
The Badi remain the lowest ranking untouchable caste in western Nepal. The rules of orthodox Hinduism dictate that members of the higher castes (Braham, Chetri, or Thakuri) cannot allow the Badi into their houses, accept water or food from them, use the same village pump, or even brush against them; although higher caste men are allowed to have sex with Badi prostitutes. "For many years, I thought it was my fate to be a prostitute," says a Badi prostitute. "Now I realize this system wasn't made by God. It was made by man."

== Geographical distribution ==
At the time of the 2011 Nepal census, 38,603 people (0.1% of the population in Nepal) were Badi. The frequency of Badi by province was as follows:

- Sudurpashchim Province (0.4%)
- Gandaki Province (0.3%)
- Karnali Province (0.3%)
- Bagmati Province (0.1%)
- Koshi Province (0.1%)
- Lumbini Province (0.1%)
- Madhesh Province (0.0%)

The frequency of Badi was higher than national average in the following districts:

- Bajura (1.4%)
- Doti (1.4%)
- Kaski (0.8%)
- Jajarkot (0.7%)
- Surkhet (0.5%)
- Tanahun (0.5%)
- Kailali (0.4%)
- Achham (0.3%)
- Dailekh (0.3%)
- Eastern Rukum (0.3%)
- Kanchanpur (0.3%)
- Mustang (0.3%)
- Salyan (0.3%)
- Tehrathum (0.3%)
- Western Rukum (0.3%)
- Bajhang (0.2%)
- Bardiya (0.2%)
- Dadeldhura (0.2%)
- Humla (0.2%)
- Nawalpur (0.2%)
- Pyuthan (0.2%)

== Representation in Culture ==
The novel 'Nathiya(नथीया)', written by the author Saraswati Pratikshya, is based on this community.
