= Sagarmatha Ko Gahirai =

Nepali poetry collection by Nawaraj Parajuli

- Cover page of the book
- Author: Nawaraj Parajuli
- Original title: सगरमाथाको गहिराइ
- Language: Nepali
- Publisher: FinePrint Publication
- Publication date: 2017
- Publication place: Nepal
- Media type: Print (Hardcover)
- Pages: 193
- Award: Padmashree Sahitya

Sagarmatha Ko Gahirai (Nepali: सगरमाथाको गहिराइ, lit. 'The depth of Everest') is a poetry collection by Nawaraj Parajuli. It was published in 2017 by FinePrint Publication. It was shortlisted for the prestigious Madan Puraskar. The book was launched in the premises of Nepal Academy by the poet and his mother, Laxmi Devi Parajuli.

== Background ==
Nawaraj Parajuli is a young Nepali poet. He is also the winner of the All Nepal Slam Poetry 2014. This is the poet's debut book. The anthology consists of 36 poems. The poems are centered around different themes such as relationships, Nepali society, and patriotism.

Parajuli has recited the poems from this anthology in various poetry events and Kavita concerts across Nepal and other countries like Australia, Portugal, etc. The recorded videos from those events are also uploaded to YouTube, where they are very popular.

== Awards ==
The book won the Padmashree Sahitya Puraskar for the year 2073 BS. A cash reward of Rs. 200,000 was awarded alongside the honor. The book was also shortlisted for the Madan Puraskar award.
