= Vijay Kumar Pandey =

Nepalese television personality

- विजयकुमार पाण्डे
- Born: Baitadi district
- Citizenship: Nepali
- Education: Syracuse University
- Occupations: Journalist, writer, TV presenter
- Years active: 1993–present
- Known for: Host of Dishanirdesh
- Notable work: Khusi
- Awards: Madan Puraskar
- Website: https://dishanirdeshplus.com

Vijay Kumar Pandey is a media personality of Nepali television. He hosts a program called Dishanirdesh.

== Career ==
Pandey's career begun with the Nepal Television show Andhyaro Ujyalo in 1987, followed by several other television projects, as well as a stint on radio with the talk programme Sanibaar Vijay Kumar Sanga on Kantipur FM.

He was editor of Nepal Magazine and has long been a columnist at Kantipur daily, as well as a consultant editor at Kantipur Television.

His debut book Khusi was launched on 12 September 2014 in Kathmandu. The book won the literary award Madan Puraskar for 2015

== Bibliography ==
- Khushi - 2014
- Sambandhaharu - 2020
