= Durga Prasad Subedi =

Nepalese Politician

Durga Prasad Subedi (Nepali: दुर्गा प्रसाद सुवेदी) is a Nepalese activist, author, and politician who was one of the three youth wing leaders of the Nepali Congress involved in the 1973 Royal Nepal Airlines DHC-6 hijacking. Subedi is also the husband of former interim Prime Minister of Nepal, Sushila Karki.

== Personal life ==
Subedi was married to Sushila Karki, the former interim Prime Minister of Nepal, in presence of former PMs - Girija Prasad Koirala and Man Mohan Adhikari. Karki also served as the first female Chief Justice of Nepal.

== Bibliography ==
- Subedi, Durga (2017). विमान विद्रोह: एउटा राजनीतिक अपहरणको बयान [Biman Bidroha] (in Nepali) (2nd ed.). Kitab Publishers. ISBN 9789937043717.
