= Sushila Karki =

Nepalese lawyer and stateswoman (born 1952)

- सुशीला कार्की
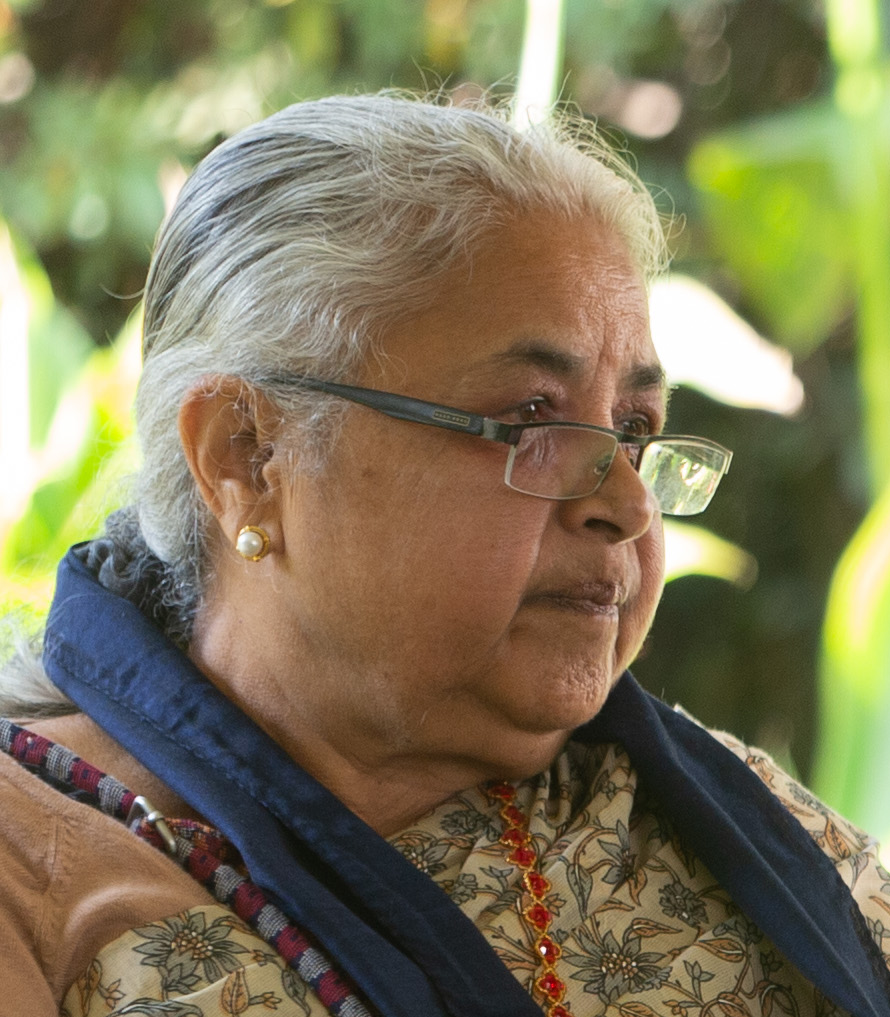
- Karki in 2021

Prime Minister of Nepal
- Interim; 12 September 2025 – 27 March 2026
- President: Ram Chandra Paudel
- Preceded by: K. P. Sharma Oli
- Succeeded by: Balendra Shah

Chief Justice of Nepal
- In office 11 July 2016 – 6 June 2017
- Appointed by: Bidya Devi Bhandari
- Preceded by: Kalyan Shrestha
- Succeeded by: Gopal Prasad Parajuli

Justice of the Supreme Court of Nepal
- In office 22 January 2009 – 6 June 2017
- Appointed by: Ram Baran Yadav
- Preceded by: Khil Raj Regmi
- Succeeded by: Deepak Raj Joshi

Personal details
- Born: 7 June 1952 (age 74) Biratnagar, Nepal
- Party: Independent
- Spouse: Durga Prasad Subedi
- Children: 1
- Education: Tribhuvan University (BA, LLB); Banaras Hindu University (MA)
- Profession: Lawyer
- Known for: First female Chief Justice of Nepal; First female Prime Minister of Nepal
- Cabinet: Karki interim cabinet

Sushila Karki (Note: Nepali: सुशीला कार्की, romanized: Suśīlā Kārkī, pronounced [susilä käɾki].) (born 7 June 1952) is a Nepalese lawyer and stateswoman who served as chief justice of Nepal from 2016 to 2017 and as interim prime minister of Nepal from 2025 to 2026. She became prime minister following the youth protests of September 2025 that led to her predecessor's resignation. Karki is the first female prime minister and female chief justice in Nepalese history.

== Early life and education ==
Karki was born on 7 June 1952 to a Chhetri family from Sankarpur (later part of Biratnagar), Nepal. She is the eldest of her family's seven children.

Karki attended Tribhuvan University, earning a Bachelor of Arts from Mahendra Morang College in 1972. She then studied political science in India, and in 1975 received a master's in political science from Banaras Hindu University. She returned to Tribhuvan University to study law, graduating in 1978.

== Early career ==
From 1986 to 1989, Karki worked as assistant teacher at Mahendra Multiple Campus, Dharan; from 1988, she concurrently was the bar president of the Koshi Zonal Court until 1990. That year, she participated in the 1990 People's Movement to overthrow the Panchayat regime and was imprisoned in Biratnagar Jail. She later wrote the novel Kara inspired by her experiences. In 2002, she was made president of the Biratnagar Appellate Court, a role she held until 2004, when she became a senior Advocate at the Nepal Bar Association.

== Supreme Court of Nepal (2009–2017) ==
Karki was appointed an ad hoc justice of the Supreme Court of Nepal in 2009. Her position was made permanent the following year. In March 2016, the Supreme Court heard a writ petition over the appointment of Khil Raj Regmi as interim Prime Minister. The court held that the petition, originally filed in 2013, was no longer relevant and dismissed it; Karki and Chief Justice Kalyan Shrestha dissented and found that the appointment of Regmi was unconstitutional. Karki later argued that Regmi's appointment had caused lasting damage to the Nepalese judiciary system.

After the retirement of Chief Justice Shrestha in April 2016, Karki was recommended to take over the role by the Constitutional Council. She served on an ad hoc basis until a formal parliamentary hearing the following July confirmed her appointment. She was the first female Chief Justice and known at the time of her appointment for being strict and anti-corruption. She faced opposition for those attributes during her tenure, and was accused by the government of working against them after the Supreme Court overturned the appointment of Jaya Bahadur Chand as Chief of Nepal Police. Impeachment proceedings, which became easier to initiate after the 2015 adoption of the Constitution, were started against her in Parliament in April 2017 by Nepali Congress and CPN (Maoist Centre); she was automatically suspended.

According to The Himalayan Times, the impeachment proceedings were viewed by many to be "politically motivated, intended to thwart the verdicts on some high-profile cases" and United Nations High Commissioner for Human Rights Zeid Ra'ad al-Hussein said that "the attempt to remove her gives rise to serious concerns about the Government's commitment to transitional justice and the rule of law". Dissatisfied with decision to impeach her, the then deputy prime minister and home minister, Bimalendra Nidhi resigned and the Rastriya Prajatantra Party left the coalition it had formed with Nepali Congress and CPN (MC). In May, Cholendra Shumsher JB Rana of the Supreme Court issued a stay against the proceedings. Due to public pressure a deal was made during a cabinet reshuffle, and the ruling parties withdrew. Karki resigned 6 June 2017 on reaching the mandatory retirement age of 65.

After her retirement from the court, Karki wrote an autobiography about her early life and career as a judge. Published as Nyaya, Karki argued that democracy relied on the independence of the judiciary. The next year, she published her novel Kara.

=== Notable decisions ===
- Om Bhakta Rana v. CIAA/Government of Nepal (Sudan Peacekeeping Mission corruption)
- Surrogacy case
- Conviction of Jay Prakash Gupta
- Overturning the appointment of Lokman Singh Karki to the Commission for the Investigation of Abuse of Authority

== Interim prime minister of Nepal (2025–2026) ==
After the 2025 Generation Z-led anti-corruption protests forced Prime Minister K. P. Sharma Oli to resign, an interim government was needed and Karki's name was suggested by activists due to her political neutrality. Following a poll on the online communication platform Discord, protester server members selected Karki out of five options, making her the first government official to be selected online. The appointment was agreed upon during talks with the Nepalese army.

Upon her recommendation, president Ram Chandra Poudel dissolved the Federal Parliament of Nepal on 12 September, and Karki was sworn in as interim Prime Minister based on article 61 of the Constitution of Nepal. She is the first woman in Nepal's history to hold the position of Prime Minister.

=== Tenure ===
Karki unveiled her cabinet beginning 15 September 2025. After taking her oath on 12 September, Karki vowed to bring peace, good governance, end corruption and conduct the fair general election in Nepal in six months starting in March 2026. In the same statement, she added those who died in the protests will be considered "martyrs". After her swearing-in, Prime Minister of India Narendra Modi, China’s foreign ministry spokesperson, and US Ambassador to Nepal Dean R. Thompson congratulated Karki on assuming the office of Prime Minister and affirmed their support to the interim government for peace and stability. On 13 September, Karki visited the hospitals of Kathmandu and met the injured Gen Z protesters, expressing solidarity and assuring them of government support. On 14 September, Karki promised to investigate vandalism during the protests and announced compensation to the injured protesters of NPR 1 million ($7,000). Families, however, feel that further steps are required to appropriately honor the sacrifice made by those deceased. On 15 September, Khenpo Sonam Tenphel, Speaker of the Tibetan Parliament-in-Exile and Sikyong Penpa Tsering of the Central Tibetan Administration extended his heartfelt congratulations to Karki. Both highlighted the close relationship between the Nepalese and Tibetans and expressed gratitude to country's government and citizens for providing facilities for Tibetan exiles' rehabilitation since 1959.

On 25 September, Karki declared that government projects which were poorly planned and carried out on a modest budget or scale by the previous government will be abandoned. In order to raise money for repairing the infrastructure that was harmed during the Gen Z protests, she also announced the creation of a reconstruction fund. She further announced that the minimum voting age has been lowered from 18 to 16 years to increase youth voter participation for the upcoming election. On 29 September, Karki Government suspended and froze the passports of ex-prime minister K. P. Sharma Oli, ex-Home Minister Ramesh Lekhak, along with three other government officials who worked under him including then-home secretary Gokarna Mani Duwadi, then-National Investigation Department chief Hutaraj Thapa, and then-chief district officer of Kathmandu, Chhabi Rijal. By 15 October, 14 writ petitions had been filed in the Supreme Court against Karki and her government.

On October 18, Karki further briefed international diplomats about the March 2026 parliamentary elections and stressed her government’s focus on transparency, anti-corruption measures, and restoring stability. On 21 October, Karki met leaders from seven political parties to discuss the 2026 elections. On 27 March 2026, Sushila Karki stepped down as Nepal's interim Prime Minister after successfully overseeing the country's transition through a political crisis and conducting general elections. Having always intended to serve only temporarily, she handed power to the newly elected government and returned to the retirement she had left in September 2025. Since leaving office, she has not held any further government or judicial position and has resumed retirement.

== Personal life ==
Karki married Durga Prasad Subedi, who as a youth wing leader of Nepali Congress was one of the perpetrators behind the 1973 Royal Nepal Airlines DHC-6 hijacking. They met while studying in Banaras Hindu University, and he was her tutor. They have at least one child.

In addition to her native Nepali, Karki speaks some Hindi and English.

== Recognitions ==
In 2026, Sushila Karki was honored with the Nagarik Nayak-2083 award by Nepal Republic Media for her contributions to the justice and anti-corruption efforts.

== Bibliography ==
- Karki, Sushila (2018). Nyaya न्याय [Justice] (in Nepali). Nepal: Book Hill Publications. ISBN 978-9937-9217-8-7.
- Karki, Sushila (2019). Kara कारा [Prison] (in Nepali). Nepal: Book Hill Publications. ISBN 978-9937-0-6806-2.

== See also ==
- 2025 Nepalese Gen Z protests – Youth-led nationwide protests in Nepal calling for political reform and better governance.
- Karki Interim Cabinet (2025–2026) – The executive government of Nepal led by Sushila Karki following the 2025 Nepalese Gen Z protests.
- 2026 Nepalese General Election – A parliamentary election held following the 2025 Nepalese Gen Z protests in which Balen Shah won representing the Rastriya Swatantra Party and became Prime Minister of Nepal.

== Notes ==
Political offices
Preceded by K. P. Sharma Oli	Prime Minister of Nepal (interim); 2025–2026	Succeeded by Balen Shah
