= Jagadish Ghimire =

Nepalese activist and writer

Jagdish Ghimire
- जगदीश घिमिरे
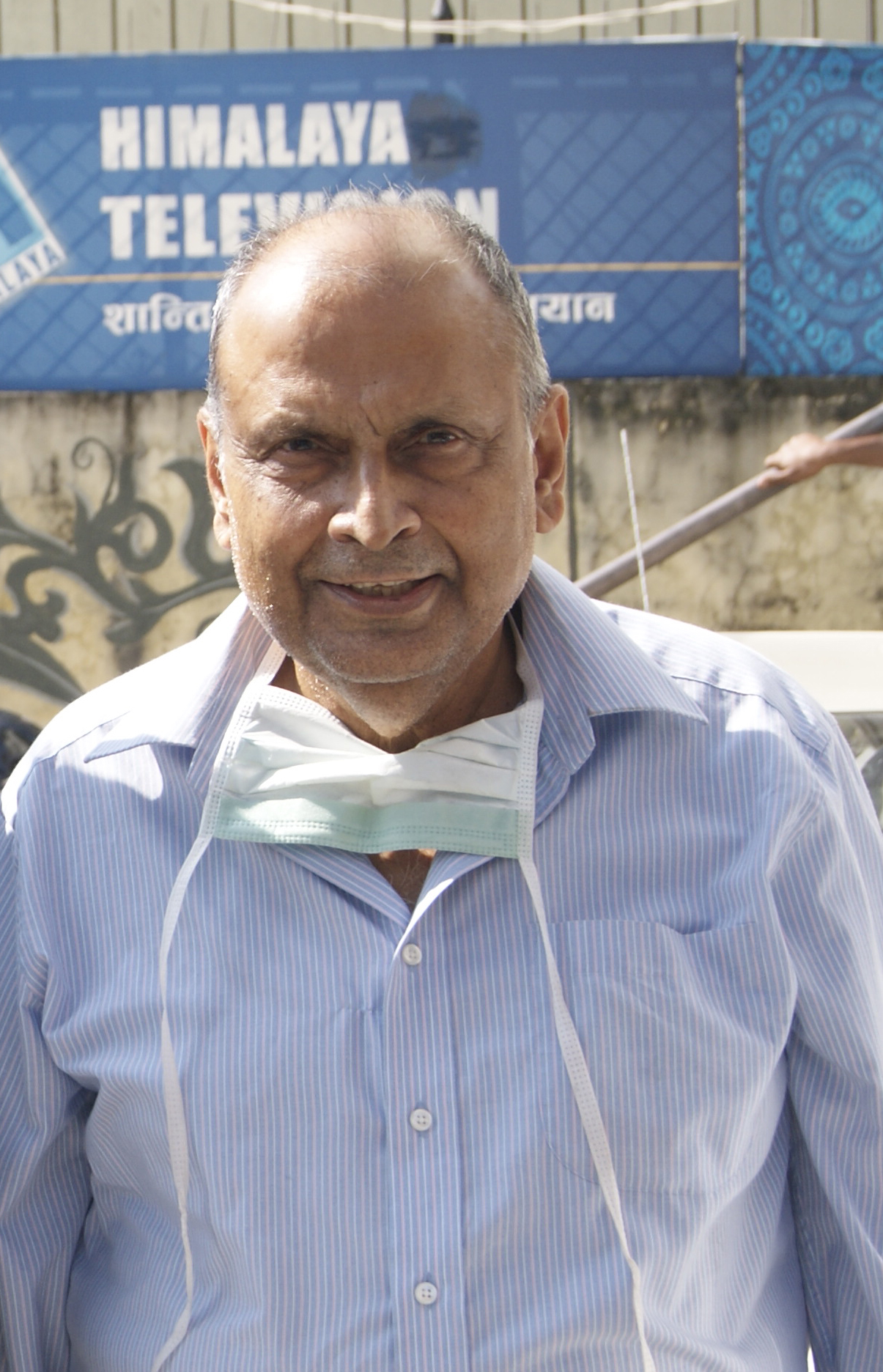
- Born: 10 April 1946; Manthali, Ramechhap District, Nepal
- Died: 31 October 2013 (aged 67); Om Hospital, Kathmandu, Nepal
- Citizenship: Nepali
- Occupations: Social activist, writer, political analyst
- Spouse: Durga Ghimire
- Children: 2

Jagdish Ghimire (10 April 1946 – 31 October 2013) was a Nepalese writer, political analyst and development worker.

== Early life ==
He had a master's degree in sociology from Patna University, India and a post-graduate diploma in population studies from the University of Wales, Cardiff, UK

== Life and career ==
Together with his wife (Durga Ghimire) he was the co-founder of Tamakoshi Seva Samiti (Tamakoshi Service Society, TSS), a nonprofit, non-governmental organisation, working in the rural areas of the Ramechhap district for community development, health and education. TSS's main goal is to provide help with reproductive health by organising communities, women empowerment, access to safe drinking water and sustainable agriculture.

He founded the NGO Federation in 1991 and led Nepal's NGO movement as its chair until in 1994.

He is the founding president of Tilganga Eye Hospital in Kathmandu.

Ghimire served as assistant director of the South Asia Region for International Planned Parenthood FederationIPPF, London, from 1984 to 1990.

He was Chief Executive Officer of the Family Planning Association of Nepal in 1980 and a consultant for the United Nations Population Fund of Nepal.

Ghimire was a visiting lecturer, Center for Population Studies, University of Wales

== Recognition ==
He won the Madan Puraskar and Uttam Shanti Puraskar for his biography "Antarmanko Yatra," written while he was in hospital for treatment of multiple myeloma of the spine.

== Death ==
Ghimire died of multiple myeloma at Om Hospital in Kathmandu on 31 October 2013.

== Publications ==
- Lilam (Auction) (Novel; 2027 BS)
- Stories of Jagadish (Story Compilation; 2029 BS)
- Sabiti(Novel; 2032 BS)
- Kehi Katha Kabita Sansmaran (2034 BS)
- Santan (offsprings)(Drama; 2034 BS)
- Antarmanko Yatra (Biography; 2064 BS)
- Bardi (Novel)
- Sakas (Novel)
