= Khusi =

Autobiography by Vijay Kumar

- Cover page
- Author: Vijay Kumar Pandey
- Original title: खुसी
- Language: Nepali
- Genre: Autobiography
- Publisher: FinePrint
- Publication date: 2014
- Publication place: Nepal
- Pages: 332
- ISBN: 9789937887762

Khusi (Nepali: खुसी) is an autobiographical book by Vijay Kumar Pandey. It was published in 2014 by FinePrint Publications and won the Madan Puraskar. The title of the book means happiness in Nepali language.

== Synopsis ==
The book depicts his story and is collection of his various experiences.

== See also ==
- Antarmanko Yatra
- Chhuteka Anuhar
- Yaar
