= Padmashree Sahitya Puraskar =

Nepali literary award

- पद्मश्री पुरस्कार
- Type: Literary award
- Awarded for: Contribution to Nepali literature
- Sponsored by: Khemlal-Harikala Lamichhane Samaaj Kalyan Pratisthan
- Reward: रु 300,000
- Established: 2006; 20 years ago (2063 BS)
- First award: 2006 (2063 BS)
- Final award: 2020 (2077 BS)

Highlights
- First winner: Ganesh Rasik (2063 BS)
- Most recent winner: Keshab Dahal (2077 BS)

Padmashree Sahitya Puraskar (Nepali: पद्मश्री साहित्य पुरस्कार, lit. 'Padmashree Literature Award') is an annual literary prize in Nepali literature, presented by Khemlal-Harikala Lamichhane Samaaj Kalyan Pratisthan. The award is given to a book that has provided a great contribution in the field of Nepali literature. This award is given alongside Padmashree Sadhana Samman.

== History ==
The award was established in 2006 (2063 BS) by writer and businessman Jiba Lamichhane. He founded the organization Khemlal-Harikala Lamichhane Samaaj Kalyan Pratisthan in honor of his parents. Ganesh Rasik was the first winner of the award.

== List of Winners and nominations ==
=== 2021 onwards ===
| Year in BS (CE) | Winner | Author | Shortlist | Longlist |
|---|---|---|---|---|
| 2078 (2021) | Arko Bhor | Keshav Raj Gyawali | Agni – Dr. Naba Raj Lamsal; Arko Bhor – Keshav Raj Gyawali; Bhikshu Sanga Prem – Usha Hamal; Mithya – Dipak Parajuli; Yaadharu ko Sanggrahalaya – Kewal Binabi | Agni – Dr. Naba Raj Lamsal; Arko Bhor – Keshav Raj Gyawali; Bhikshu Sanga Prem – Usha Hamal; Bhojpur ko Bangmaya – Dr. Biplov Dhakal; Chail – Lok Raj Bhatta Talcha – Dilip Bantawa; Ek Sambodan Samaymathi – Dina Nath Sharma; Guru – Kabita Rai; Kafka ko Kam Sakiyo – Rajab; Mahabhara – Basanta Basnet; Mithya – Dipak Parajuli; Ninada Vallari – Alka Atreya; Paitalama Hiun, Aankhama Duniya – Rajendra Man Dangol; Satyamohan – Girish Giri; Yaadharu ko Sanggrahalaya – Kewal Binabi |

=== 2006 – 2020 ===
| Year in BS (CE)^{[Note a]} | Winning books | Author |
|---|---|---|
| 2077 (2020) | Mokshabhumi | Keshab Dahal |
| 2076 (2019)^{[Note b]} | Hansa | Sanjeev Uprety |
| 2075 (2018) | Chhuteka Anuhar | Ramesh Sayan |
| 2074 (2017) | Yaar | Nayan Raj Pandey |
| 2073 (2016) | Sagarmatha Ko Gahirai | Nawaraj Parajuli |
| 2072 (2015) | Cheerharan | Neelam Karki Niharika |
| 2071 (2014) | Mantha Darayeko Jug | Mohan Mainali |
| 2071 (2014) | Laato Pahaad | Upendra Subba |
| 2070 (2013) | Annapurna Ko Bhoj | Manu Brajaki |
| 2069 (2012) | Taap | Sharada Sharma |
| 2068 (2011) | Aafnai Aakha ko Layama | Khagendra Sangraula |
| 2067 (2010) | Arjun Drishti | Rabindra Sameer |
| 2067 (2010) | Jiwan Kada Ki Phool | Jhamak Ghimire |
| 2066 (2009) | Paniko Gham | Amar Neupane |
| 2066 (2009) | Akalpaniya | Dhurba Sapkota |
| 2065 (2008) | Samaya Harayeko Bela | Krishna Baral |
| 2064 (2007) | Himwatakhanda | Bhanubhakta Pokhrel |
| 2063 (2006) | Das Gajaa ma Ubhiera | Ganesh Rasik |

== Monetary Prize ==
The winner of the honor was rewarded with रु100,000 initially. It was then increased to रु200,000. Since 2076 BS, the prize money is रु300,000. Since the honor was given to two writers in 2071, 2067 and 2066 each, the prize money was divided in half.

== Controversy ==
The award was cancelled for the year 2076, after writer Sanjeev Uprety declined to accept the award. He decided to withdraw due to the allegations regarding the Padmashree Sadhana Samman winner, Modanath Prasit.

== See also ==
- Madan Puraskar
- Jagadamba Shree Puraskar
- Sajha Puraskar

== Notes ==
- ^[Note a] Year in B.S. = Year in C.E. + 56\57; 2077 B.S. = 2020/2021
- ^[Note b] Sanjeev Uprety declined to accept the award due to a controversy with Padmashree Sadhana Samman winner, Modanath Prasrit. The award ceremony was cancelled.
