= Buddhisagar =

Nepali writer (born 1981)

- बुद्धिसागर
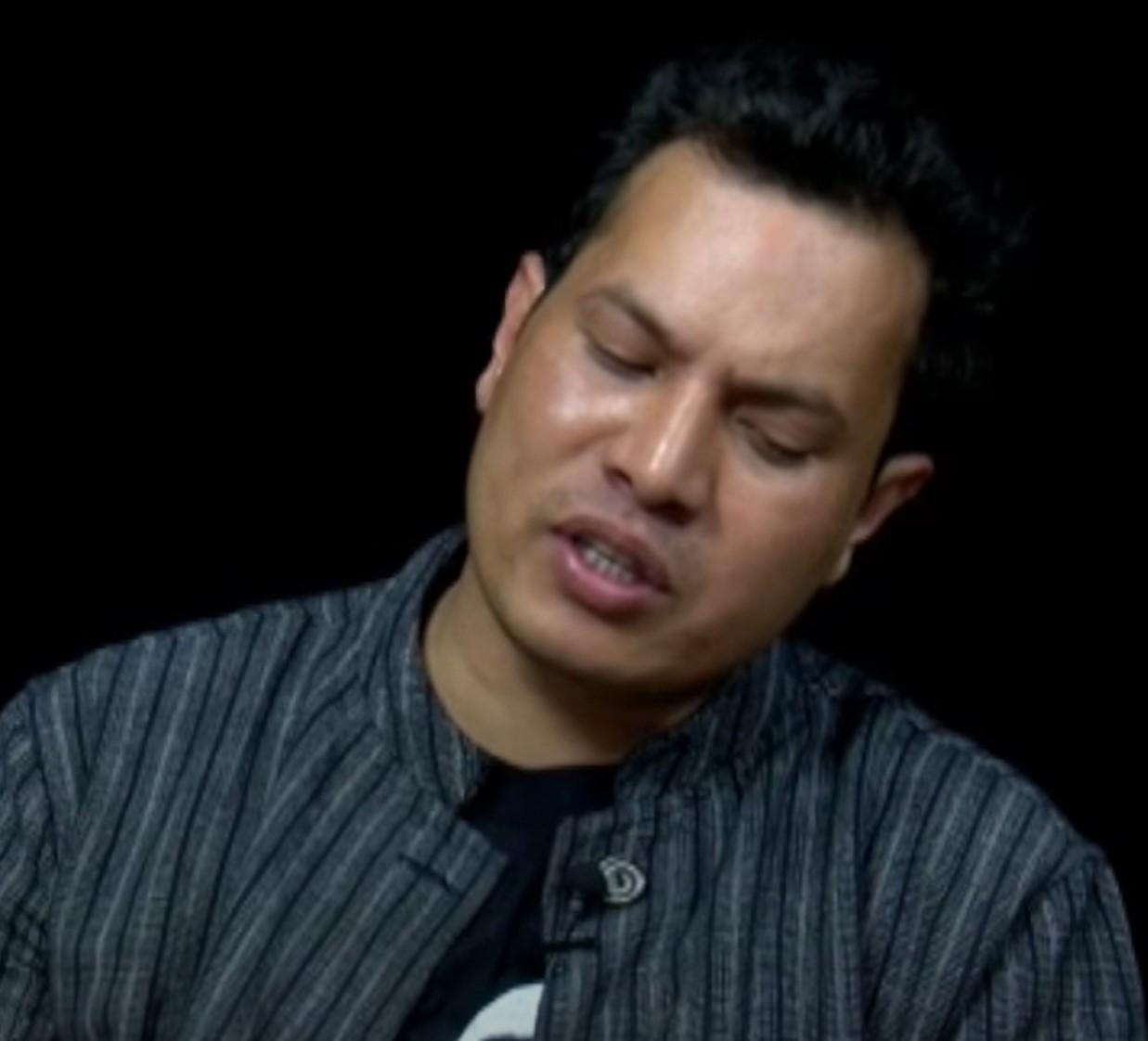
- Buddhisagar reciting poem (2016)
- Born: Buddhi Ram Chapain; 2 June 1981 (age 45); Kailali District, Nepal
- Occupations: Poet; Writer; Columnist
- Children: 1
- Writing career
- Genres: Fiction, poetry
- Notable works: Karnali Blues; Phirphire; Eklo

Buddhi Ram Chapain, popularly known as Buddhisagar (Nepali: बुद्धिसागर; born 2 June 1981) is a Nepalese writer and poet. He is best known for his novels, Karnali Blues and Phirphire.

== Early life ==
Buddhisagar was born on 2 June 1981 in the Kailali district of Nepal. Later his family moved to Katase Bazzar and finally Kalikot district. His debut and most popular novel Karnali Blues is also set in these locations. He was passionate about writing from an early age. From a very early age, his poems were played on radios. He moved to Kathmandu after passing his School Level.

== Literary career ==
On moving to Kathmandu, he studied journalism at the RR Campus. He was a journalist of Naya Patrika and Nagarik News before he set his career as a full-time writer.

Buddhisagar published his first novel, Karnali Blues, in the Autumn of 2010, and it has since been warmly received and widely praised. It is written in Nepali but several of its characters speak in Tharu and the Jumli dialect of Nepali. The novel is set in recent times and centres upon the central character's relationship with his father, who lies dying in a hospital bed.

He published his second novel, Phirphire in 2016.

- His first novel, Karnali Blues was translated into English by Prof. Michael J. Hutt with same title and was published in 2021 by Penguin Books. His third novel Eklo was released in December 2022.
- He wrote script of Nepali movie called "K ghar K dera" which was release in 2082 BS. https://kathmandupost.com/movie-review/2025/05/23/in-ke-ghar-ke-dera-ghar-number-2-beleaguered-businessmen-and-benevolent-saviours

== Works ==
- Rara Jalepachi (2004, Gazal collection)
- Hazarau Prithvi Hazarau Aakash (Poetry collection)
- Buddhisagar ka Kabita (2007, Poetry collection)
- Karnali Blues (2010, Novel)
- Phirphire (2015, Novel)
- Prerana and Lal Peela (2019, Children's book)
- Eklo (2022)
- Usle Diyko Umer (2023)

== Awards ==
- Rastriya Kavita Pratiyogita (National Poem Competition), 2001
- Rastriya Kavita Mahotsav (National Poem Ceremony), 2003
- Rastriya Pratibha Puraskar (National Talent Award) from Nepal Government, 2010
