= Karnali Blues =

Nepali Book by Buddhi Sagar

- Cover page of the original edition
- Author: Buddhi Sagar
- Original title: कर्नाली ब्लुज
- Translator: Michael Hutt
- Cover artist: Niraj Bhari and Subarna Humagain
- Language: Nepali
- Genre: Fiction (Bildungsroman)
- Set in: Kailali, Surkhet, Kalikot, Kathmandu
- Published: 2010
- Publisher: FinePrint Publication
- Publication date: 2010
- Publication place: Nepal
- Media type: Print (Paperback)
- Pages: 400
- ISBN: 9789937827935
- Followed by: Phirphire

Karnali Blues (Nepali: कर्नाली ब्लुज) is book written by Buddhi Sagar and published by FinePrint publication, Nepal in 2010. Karnali Blues is a story about a young boy who travels through different phases of his life with his parents. The story's main focus is on the protagonist's father. The book is one of the best selling Nepalese novels.

== Synopsis ==
The novel depicts the father-son relationship in a family from the Mid-western region of Nepal. The family had descended from Surkhet to the plains around present Bardiya National Park when the forest lands had opened up to agriculture, and then moved to Kalikot.

Brisha Bahadur, the narrator of the novel, is born into a Pahari family. They are one of the hill people families, who have been moving down to the plains in growing numbers over the past fifty years to open up newly cleared forest lands for agriculture. Brisha Bahadur's family belongs to this community, which dominates local commerce, trade and politics and forms a majority in the small bazaar towns of the district.

The story of Brisha's childhood is intertwined with a parallel story that begins with Brisha's father's admission into a hospital when Brisha is a teenager. Brisha Bahadur narrates his father's struggles. The novel is divided into eleven days. Brisha Bahadur is taking care of his father who is sick in those eleven days and he reminisces his past with his parents.

The novel is loosely modelled after Buddhi's own childhood, which passed in the same municipalities, although with different circumstances.

== Characters ==
- Brisha Bahadur — Narartor and main protagonist of the book
- Harsha Bahadur — Brisha Bahadur's father
- Brisha Bahadur's mother
- Chandre — Brisha Bahadur's childhood friend
- Parvati — Brisha Bahadur's sister
- Mamata — Parvati's friend

== Translation ==
This book was translated into English by Michael Hutt, a professor of Nepali and Himalayan Studies at the School of Oriental And African Studies as Karnali Blues. The book was published by Penguin India on December 27, 2021, in Nepal, India, Pakistan, Bangladesh, Sri Lanka, Bhutan and the Maldives.

== See also ==
- Seto Dharti
- Faatsung
- Loo
