= Rejectionists =

Iraqi rebel group

- Allegiance: Sunni Iraq; Iraqi Ba'ath Party
- Ideology: Ba'athism; Sunni Islamism; Anti-Americanism

The Rejectionists are an insurgent group operating within Iraq as of 2009. As defined by the United States Army, the group is composed of members of the former Ba'ath regime, of which Saddam Hussein was leader. The group is predominantly Sunni Muslim.
