= Jiwan Kada Ki Phool =

2010 Nepali autobiographical book

Jiwan Kada Ki Phool (A flower in the midst of thorns)
- Author: Jhamak Kumari Ghimire
- Original title: जीवन काँडा कि फूल
- Language: Nepali
- Published: Jhamak Ghimire Sahitya Pratisthan 2010
- Publication place: Nepal
- Media type: Biography
- Pages: 250 pages
- Awards: Madan Puraskar
- ISBN: 978-9-93-722347-8

Jiwan Kada Ki Phool' (Nepali:जीवन काँडा कि फूल) is a book written by Madan Puraskar winner Jhamak Ghimire about her own story. It has been printed seven times within two years making it the Nepali best seller of all time. It has also received many other awards. It has recently been translated into English as "A flower in the midst of thorns". It is all about her life and the difficulties she faced.

== Reception ==
The book won the prestigious Madan Puraskar for 2010. It also won the Padmashree Sahitya Puraskar in the same year

== See also ==
- Nyaya
- Singha Durbarko Ghumne Mech
- Khalangama Hamala
