= Seto Dharti =

2012 Nepali Novel

- Author: Amar Neupane
- Original title: सेतो धरती
- Cover artist: Chirag Wangdel (Picture artist); Suwarna Humagain (Design)
- Language: Nepali
- Genre: Fiction
- Publisher: Fineprints Books
- Publication date: March 2012
- Publication place: Nepal
- Media type: Print
- Pages: 373
- Awards: Madan Puraskar
- ISBN: 978-9937-8563-4-8
- OCLC: 1085939500
- Preceded by: Paniko Gham
- Followed by: Karodaun Kasturi

Seto Dharti (Nepali: सेतो धरती, lit. 'White earth') is a Nepali novel written by Amar Neupane. It was published in 2012 by FinePrint Publication. It is the second novel of the author who previously penned a novel called Paniko Gham. It won the Madan Puraskar, the biggest literary award in Nepal.

== Synopsis ==
The story is based on the life of a girl named Tara. She is a simple girl living in her village spending her time playing with other children of same village. While the story goes on, she gets married at the age of seven, the very age at which she does not even understand the meaning of marriage. The story in the novel is of the time period 1933-2011 when child marriage used to be very common in Nepalese society.

Tara's husband has to go for his studies to Banaras, where he dies. Tara, a nine year old girl, is now bound to live her life as a child widow. The story continues and many difficulties come one by one in Tara's life. She comes back from her husband's home to her father's home. She tries to live her life peacefully trying to forget all the pain that life gave her when she was a young child. Later on, her mother dies and she has to take over all the responsibilities of the house.

At her adult age, she leaves her father's house as she gets abused by her stepmother and moves to Devghat, a religious place for Hindus. There she makes a small hut and starts to live a long, boring life. The story mainly tries to reveal the terrible cultural practice called child marriage and child widowhood. This story portrays the pain of a child widow living her whole life without company. The novel best tries to shows bitter reality of Nepalese society where women have to suffer very much before the eradication of many evil practice.

== Reception ==
The book won the prestigious Madan Puraskar for that year. The book also won the INLS Best Book Award (Novel) for 2013.

== See also ==
- Karnali Blues
- Radha
- Sallipir
- Pagal Basti
