= 1973 Royal Nepal Airlines DHC-6 hijacking =

Plane hijacking in Nepal

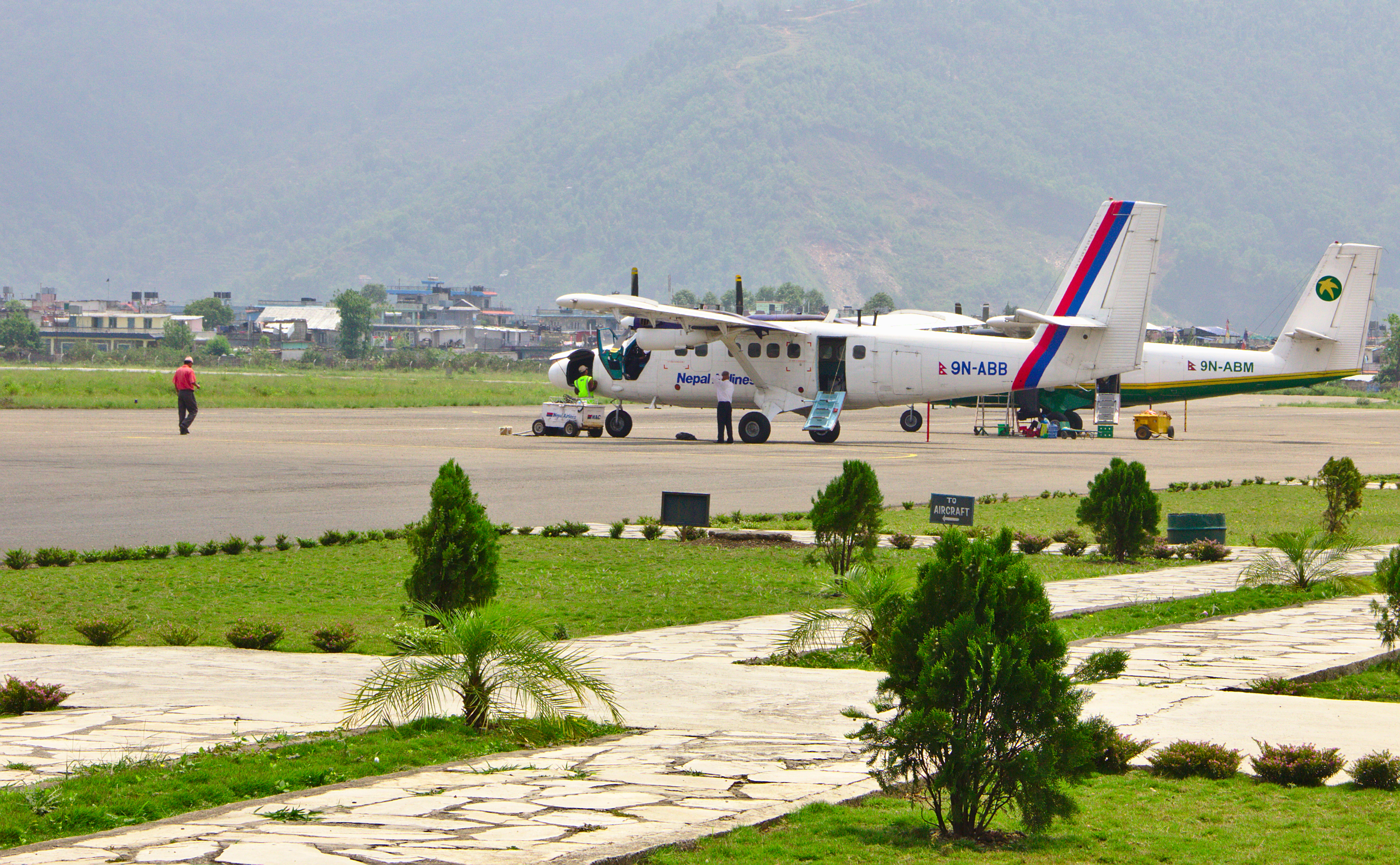
- The involved aircraft at Pokhara Airport forty years later

Hijack
- Date: 10 June 1973
- Summary: Aircraft hijacking
- Site: Forbesganj, Bihar, India

Aircraft
- Aircraft type: de Havilland Canada DHC-6 Twin Otter
- Operator: Royal Nepal Airlines
- Registration: 9N-ABB
- Flight origin: Biratnagar Airport, Biratnagar, Nepal
- Destination: Tribhuvan International Airport, Kathmandu, Nepal
- Occupants: 22
- Passengers: 19
- Crew: 3
- Fatalities: 0
- Injuries: 0
- Survivors: 22

The 1973 Royal Nepal Airlines DHC-6 hijacking (also known as the Biratnagar Plane Hijack) was the first aircraft hijacking in the history of Nepal.

The main motive for this incident was to gather funds for an armed revolution to restore multi-party democracy by overthrowing the party-less Panchayat system headed by the King in Nepal, Mahendra of Nepal.

== Aircraft ==
The aircraft was a DHC-6 Twin Otter (Registration: 9N-ABB) and was delivered to Royal Nepal Airlines in 1971.

== Hijackers ==
Durga Subedi was recently released from prison, where he read about the hijacking of Japan Airlines Flight 351. He came up with the idea of using a similar hijacking to collect funds. They were tipped from Madan Aryal who worked at Nepal Rastra Bank in Biratnagar and knew that the bank would transport Indian currency by plane through Biratnagar. Nagendra Dhungel and Basanta Bhattarai joined the team to hijack the plane.

== Crew and passengers ==
Three crew members and 19 passengers were on board the flight, including actress Mala Sinha.

== Hijacking ==
On 10 June 1973, Nepal Rastra Bank planned to transport Indian Rupees from Araria district (Bihar), India to Kathmandu via Biratnagar. It was transported to Biratnagar by land, and was supposed then go to Kathmandu by air. At 8:30 NPT, the 19-seater Royal Nepal Airlines Twin Otter passenger aircraft took off for Kathmandu from Biratnagar. The three hijackers hijacked the plane within five minutes of take-off. They forced the pilot to land the plane in Forbesganj, Bihar, in a grass field and took 3 million Indian rupees that belonged to the Nepalese government.

The hijackers who boarded the plane were Basanta Bhattarai, Durga Subedi, and Nagendra Prasad Dhungel. Girija Prasad Koirala and Chakra Prasad Bastola were involved in transportation of the loot to Darjeeling. They hid it in the house of B. L. Sharma, an acquaintance of Bishweshwar Prasad Koirala. Ganesh Sharma, an Indian national, arrived with a jeep to the landing site. Other members involved who were at the field in Forbesganj were Binod Aryal, Sushil Koirala, Manahari Baral, Rajendra Dahal and Biru Lama. Three different vehicles were used in transporting the three boxes of cash to Darjeeling.

== Aftermath ==
The plane took off immediately with the passengers after the boxes of cash were taken out. The hijackers went first to Darjeeling, then to Banaras and finally to Bombay (now Mumbai). The hijackers occasionally made trips to New Delhi to meet BP Koirala, then the president of Nepali Congress. However, within a year all hijackers were arrested in India except Nagendra Dhungel. After the 1975 Emergency in India ended, they were released on bail.

The DH-6 was used afterward for Nepalese flights for another 41 years, until it was destroyed in the 2014 crash of Nepal Airlines Flight 183. The parts of the aircraft were brought to Nepalganj and were put together again and are currently being exhibited in the BP Museum in Sundarijal, Kathmandu.

In 2017, a political and historical documentary about this incident titled Hijacking for Democracy was screened at the Nepal Tourism Board in Bhrikutimandap, Kathmandu.

== Controversies ==
It has been alleged that the money, meant to be used in the struggle for democracy, was misused. BP Koirala himself suspected that the money was misused.

== See also ==
- Indian Airlines Flight 814
