= Antarmanko Yatra =

Autobiography by Jagadish Ghimire

Antarman Ko Yatra
- Cover page of the book
- Author: Jagadish Ghimire
- Original title: अन्तर्मनको यात्रा
- Language: Nepali
- Publisher: Jagadish Ghimire Pratisthan
- Publication date: 2008
- Publication place: Nepal
- Media type: Print (Paperback)
- Pages: 297
- Awards: Madan Puraskar
- ISBN: 9789937217705

Antarmanko Yatra (Nepali: अन्तर्मनको यात्रा) is an autobiography written by Jagadish Ghimire. The book won the Madan Puraskar in 2064 B.S. (2007).

== See also ==
- Khusi
- Khalangama Hamala
- Yaar
- Chhuteka Anuhar
