= Jiyara =

2021 short story collection by Nayan Raj Pandey

- Cover page of the book
- Author: Nayan Raj Pandey
- Original title: जियरा
- Language: Nepali
- Genre: Short stories
- Publisher: FinePrint
- Publication date: June 14, 2021
- Publication place: Nepal
- Media type: Print (Paperback)
- Pages: 271
- ISBN: 9789937746175
- Preceded by: Yaar

Jiyara (Nepali: जियरा) is a 2021 Nepali short story collection by Nayan Raj Pandey. It was published on June 14, 2021, by FinePrint Publication and is the third short story collection and the tenth published book of the writer.. The book consists of 13 stories which are mostly set in Madhesh like Pandey's other two most popular works, Loo and Ulaar. The title of the book is a Hindi word meaning soul or inner heart. The book was supposed to be released during April 2020 but was delayed due to COVID-19 pandemic.

== Synopsis ==
The stories are mostly set in the southern plains of the Mid-Western region of Nepal. The stories depicts the traditions, culture and socio-economic conditions of the people of that region. The stories also includes phrases, songs and folk taels of Awadhi language. The stories are an example of Anchalik (Regional) literature. The stories on this collection presents a strong critique of capitalism, corrupt politics, political establishment, greed and patriarchy. The genres of the stories are realism and magic realism.

The stories included in this book are:

- Janani
- Sharpadas
- Raar
- Kabai Arghyalo Nathapnu
- Mailo Kamij ko Eklap
- Ya Devi
- Fish Fry
- Soat Hiye
- Jiyara
- Salma Sitara
- Laila O Laila
- Siri Upama Jagey
- Daimara

== Reception and awards ==
The book received positive responses from the critics. Bishal Babu Basnet in his review for Farakdhar praised it as "one of his best works". Khim Lamichhane Kaji of Sahitya Post praised Pandey for his "unique and experimental style" in his new book.

The book won the Karnali Sahitya Samaj Kriti Puraskar (Karnali Literary Society Book Award) for the year 2077 BS. The award was presented by Karnali Sahitya Samaj (Karnali Literary Society).
