= Michael Hutt (academic and translator) =

Professor of Nepali and Himalayan Studies

- Born: 11 October 1957 (age 69)
- Occupations: Professor of Nepali and Himalayan Studies
- Board member of: Britain-Nepal Academic Council
- Awards: Nai Derukha International Award

Academic background
- Education: School of Oriental and African Studies (BA, PhD)

Academic work
- Discipline: Nepali and Himalayan Studies
- Sub-discipline: Nepali language; South Asian Studies; Postcolonial Studies; Nepali literature
- Institutions: University of London School of Oriental and African Studies
- Main interests: Contemporary Nepali literature
- Website: Official Website

Michael James Hutt (born 11 October 1957) is an independent scholar engaged in the study of modern and contemporary Nepali literature, and as a translator. He was a Emeritus Professor of Nepali and Himalayan Studies at the School of Oriental and African Studies (SOAS), University of London.

== Biography and career ==
Hutt was educated at St. Austell Grammar School, and St. Austell Sixth Form College before completing a BA in South Asian Studies (Hindi) in 1980 and a Ph.D. on the history of the Nepali language and its literature in 1984, both at SOAS.

In 1987 he returned to SOAS as a British Academy Postdoctoral Fellow. He would continue to work at the school as a professor in the Centre of South Asian Studies and the Centre for Cultural, Literary and Postcolonial Studies for the next 33 years.

In 1995, he became the Head of the South Asia Department. He would serve in that position until 1999. Hutt also worked as Associate Dean for two years (2002-2004) and Dean of the Faculty of Languages and Cultures for six years (2004-2010).

Hutt focused his research on Nepali and Himalayan studies, publishing research on Nepali literature, Nepali language, Nepali Dalit literature, Nepali and South Asian art, Nepali history, Indian Gorkhas and Nepali Indian diaspora, Bhutanese refugees, and more.

Hutt served as a founding executive committee member and chair (2010-2013) of the Britain-Nepal Academic Council.

In 2011, the Chancellor of the Nepal Academy presented Hutt with the Nai Derukha International Award "for his continuous dedication to promoting the study of Nepali literature in the international arena."

== Publications ==
=== Authored books ===
- Hutt, Michael (2010) The Life of Bhupi Sherchan: Poetry and Politics in Post-Rana Nepal. New Delhi: Oxford University Press.
- Hutt, Michael and Chettri, Lil Bahadur (2008) Mountains Painted with Turmeric. New York: Columbia University Press.
- Hutt, Michael (2003) Unbecoming Citizens: Culture, Nationhood, and the Flight of Refugees from Bhutan. Oxford University Press.
- Hutt, Michael and Subedi, Abhi (1999) Teach Yourself Nepali. A complete course in understanding, speaking and writing Nepali. London: Hodder Headline.
- Hutt, Michael (1997) Modern Literary Nepali: an Introductory Reader. Oxford University Press (New Delhi).
- Hutt, Michael (1996) Devkota's Muna-Madan: Translation and Analysis. Kathmandu: Sajha Publishers.
- Hutt, Michael (1994) Nepal: a Guide to the Art and Architecture of the Kathmandu Valley. Gartmore: Kiscadale Publications.
- Hutt, Michael (1991) Himalayan Voices: An Introduction to Modern Nepali Literature. Berkeley: University of California Press. (Voices from Asia)
- Hutt, Michael (1988) Nepali: A National Language and its Literature. New Delhi and London: Sterling Publishers and School of Oriental and African Studies.

=== Edited books ===
- Hutt, Michael, ed. (2004) Himalayan ‘People’s War’: Nepal's Maoist Rebellion. London: C. Hurst and Co.
- Hutt, Michael, ed. (1994) Bhutan: Perspectives on Conflict and Dissent. Gartmore: Kiscadale Publications.
- Hutt, Michael, ed. (1994) Nepal in the Nineties: Versions of the Past, Visions of the Future. New Delhi : Oxford University Press. (SOAS studies on South Asia)

=== Book chapters ===
- Hutt, Michael (2009) 'Where is home for an Indian Nepali writer?' In: Subba, T.B. and Sinha, A.C. and Nepal, G.S. and Nepali, D.R., (eds.), Indian Nepalis: Issues and Perspectives. New Delhi : Concept Publishing Companhael (2004) 'Introduction: Monarchy, Democracy and Maoism in Nepal.' In: Hutt, M., (ed.), Himalayan 'People's War': Nepal's Maoist Rebelon : Indiana University Press: Hurst & Company, pp. 1–20.
- Hutt, Michael (2003) 'Reading Sumnima.' In: Lecomte-Tilouine, M. and Dolfus, P., (eds.), Ethnic Revival and Religious Turmoil. Identities and Representation in the Himalayas. Oxford University Press, pp. 23–43. Hutt, Michael (2001) 'Rup Chand Bista.' In: Jones, D, (ed.), Censorship: a World Encyclopedia. Fitzroy Dearborn (UK & USA), pp. 1689–1690.
- Hutt, Michael (2001) 'Bhutan.' In: Jones, D, (ed.), Censorship: a World Encyclopedia. Fitzroy Dearborn (London and Chicago), pp. 225–226.
- Hutt, Michael (2001) 'Nepal.' In: Jones, D, (ed.), Censorship: a World Encyclopedia. Fitzroy Dearborn (UK & USA), pp. 246–247.
- Hutt, Michael (1997) 'Being Nepali without Nepal: reflections on a South Asian diaspora.' In: D, eds and Pfaff-Czarnecka, J and Whelpton, J, (eds.), Nationalism and Ethnicity in a Hindu Kingdom. The Politics of Culture in Contemporary Nepal. Harwood Academic Publishers (Amsterdam), pp. 101–144.
- Hutt, Michael (1996) Looking for Shangri-la, from Hilton to Lamicchane. In: T, ed, (ed.), The Tourist Image: Myths and Myth-Making in Tourism. John Wiley & Sons (Chichester), pp. 49–60.

=== Articles ===
- Hutt, Michael (2012) 'Singing the New Nepal.' Nations and Nationalism, 18 (2). pp. 306–325.
- Hutt, Michael and Whelpton, John (2011) 'The Catalogue of the Hodgson Collection in the British Library.' European Bulletin of Himalayan research, 39 . pp. 128–143.
- Hutt, Michael (2007) 'Bhupi Sherchan: from schoolboy to Sarvahara.' Studies in Nepali History and Society, 12 (1). pp. 1–24.
- Hutt, Michael (2007) 'A Nepalese Triangle: Monarchy, Maoists and Political Parties.' Asian Affairs, 38 (1). pp. 12–22.
- Hutt, Michael (2006) 'Things That Should Not Be Said: Censorship and Self-Censorship in the Nepali Press Media, 2001–02.' The Journal of Asian Studies, 65 (2). pp. 361–392.
- Hutt, Michael (2006) 'Nepal and Bhutan in 2005. Monarchy and Democracy: Can They Co-exist?' Asian Survey, 46 (1). pp. 120–124.
- Hutt, Michael (2005) 'Nepal and Bhutan in 2004: Two Kings, Two Futures.' Asian Survey, 45 (1). pp. 83–87.
- Hutt, Michael (2005) 'The Bhutanese refugees: between verification, repatriation and royal realpolitik.' Journal of Peace and Democracy in South Asia, vol.1 (1) . pp. 44–55.
- Hutt, Michael (2005) 'King Gyanendras coup and its implications for Nepals future.' The Brown Journal of World Affairs, vol. 12 (1) . pp. 111–123.
- Hutt, Michael (2001) 'Monarchy, Maoism and democracy in Nepal.' Journal of Conflict, Security & Development, vol. 1 (no2) . pp. 93–101.
- Hutt, Michael (2000) 'Unadmitted Histories: the lives of Dalchan and Garjaman Gurun.' European Bulletin of Himalayan Research, 19 . pp. 101–115.
- Hutt, Michael (1998) 'Going to Mugalan: Nepali literary representations of migration to India and Bhutan.' South Asia Research, 18 (2). pp. 195–214.
- Hutt, Michael (1997) 'Bhutan in 1996: Continuing Stress.' Asian Survey, 37 (2). pp. 155–159.
- Hutt, Michael (1996) 'Bhutan in 1995: Weathering the Storm.' Asian Survey, 36 (2). pp. 204–208.
- Hutt, Michael (1996) 'Ethnic Nationalism, refugees and Bhutan.' Journal of Refugee Studies, 9 No.4 . pp. 397–420.
- Hutt, Michael (1994) 'The Poetry of Mohan Koirala.' Journal of South Asian Literature, 29 (1). pp. 155–174.
- Hutt, Michael (1993) 'Bhutan: Refugees from Shangri-la.' Index on Censorship, 22 (4). pp. 9–14.
- Hutt, Michael (1991) 'Drafting the Nepal Constitution, 1990.' Asian Survey, 31 (11). pp. 1020–1039.
- Hutt, Michael (1991) 'Nepal: the Pale Dawn of Democracy.' Index on Censorship, 20 (7). pp. 18–26.
- Hutt, Michael (1990) 'The Blowing of the April Wind: Writers and democracy in Nepal.' Index on Censorship, 19 (8). pp. 5–9.
- Hutt, Michael (1989) 'A hero or a traitor? The Gurkha soldier in Nepali literature.' South Asia Research, 9 (1). pp. 21–32.
- Hutt, Michael (1989) 'Reflections of Political Change in Modern Nepali Literature.' Kailash - Journal of Himalayan Studies, 15 (3–4). pp. 135–156.
- Hutt, Michael (1984) 'Neon Lights and Vedic caves: European influences on the Nepali writer.' South Asia Research, 4 (2). pp. 124–138.

=== Monographs ===
- Hutt, Michael (1988) Nepali: A National Language and its Literature. Other. New Delhi and London: Sterling Publishers and School of Oriental and African Studies.

=== Translations ===
Among Hutt's published translation works is the English translation of Buddhisagar's novel Karnali Blues.
