= Nayan Raj Pandey =

Nepali writer (born 1966)

- नयनराज पाण्डे
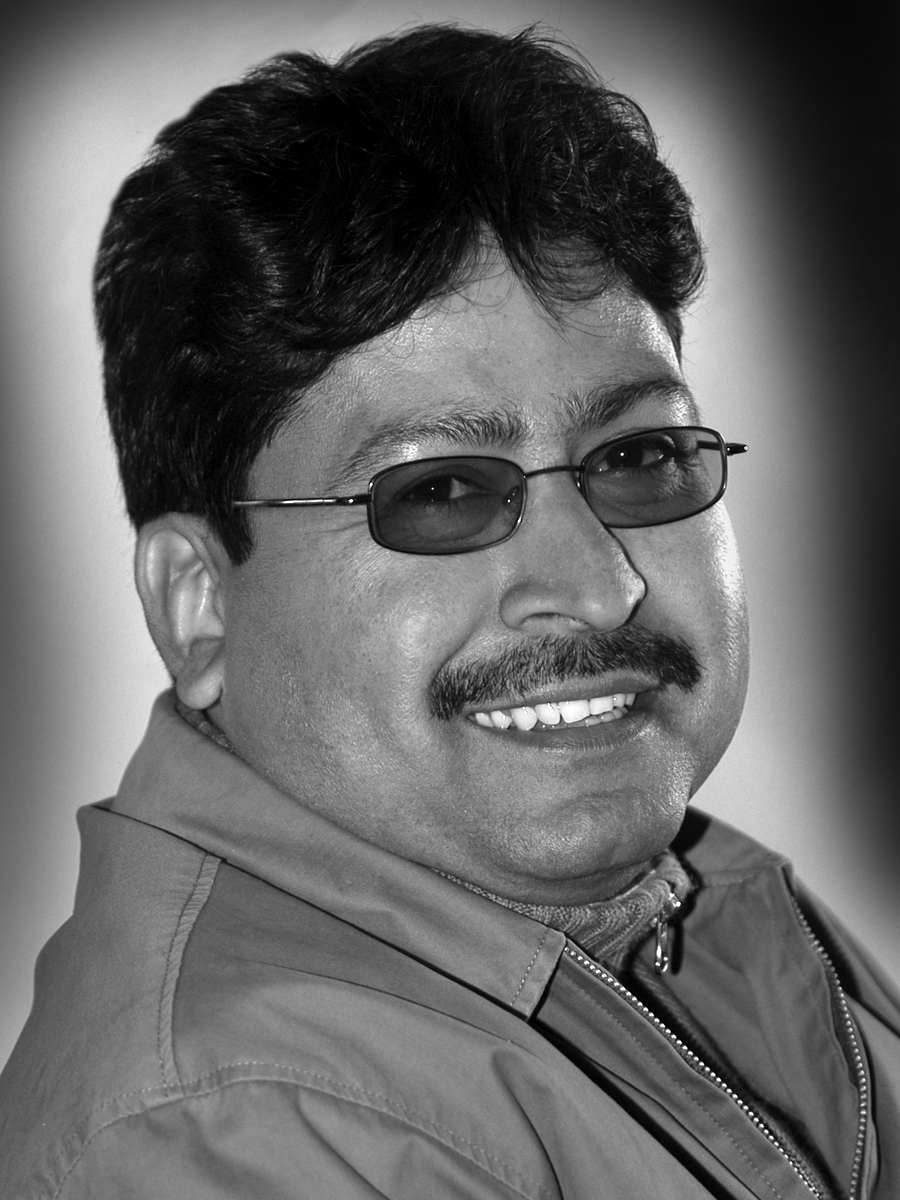
- Born: 9 June 1966 (age 60); Pyukha, Kathmandu District, Nepal
- Education: Nepal Law Campus,1991
- Occupations: Writer, screenwriter
- Notable work: Ular, Loo, Jiyara
- Spouse: Sanu Pandey
- Children: 2
- Parents: Dilli Raj Pandey (father); Bhagbati Devi Pandey (mother)
- Awards: Padmashree Sahitya Puraskar (2074 BS)

Nayan Raj Pandey (Nepali: नयनराज पाण्डे) is a Nepali writer and screenwriter. He writes stories and novels, as well as screenplays for Nepali cinema. He is known for his representation of contemporary Nepalese society in his novels, presented in a figurative style. He received the Padmashree Sahitya Puraskar for his autobiographical book Yaar in 2017. Ulaar, Loo, Ghamkiri, and Sallipir are Pandey’s popular novels.

== Early life and education ==
He was born in June 1966 in Pyukha Tole, Kathmandu to Dilli Raj Pandey a civil servant in Department of Information and Bhagbati Devi Pandey, a housewife. After his father was appointed Headmaster at a school in Nepalgunj, the family moved there where the writer spend most of his childhood. He also obtained his School Leaving Certificate and higher secondary education in Nepalgunj. His father's collection of books and interest in literature piqued his interest towards reading.

== Professional life ==
He moved to Kathmandu in 1987 to pursue Bachelor of Law degree. He earned his degree from Nepal Law Campus in 1991. After earning his degree, he chose to make his mark through writing. Majority of his works are centered around the socio-economic situation of Nepalgunj and underrepresented and isolated southern plains of Mid-Western region of Nepal.

== Notable works ==
=== Novels ===
- Nango Manchheko Diary (1987)
- Bikramaditya Euta Suun Kath (1987)
- Atirikta (1993)
- Ular (1998)
- Loo (2011)
- Ghamkiri (2013)
- Sallipir (2016)

=== Short stories collection ===
- Nidaye Jagadamba (2008)
- Khor Bhitra ko Joker
- Chocolate (2013)
- Jiyara (2021)

=== Autobiography ===
- Yaar (2017)

=== Screenplay ===
- Afno Ghar Afno Manchhe (2001)
- Basain (2005)
- Maina (2008)
- Dancing on the Fire: Khali Khaney (Video documentary short) (2011)

== Awards ==
Pandey has received multiple awards for his contribution to film and literature fields. Some of the awards are:

- Best Drama Writing Prize 1988 by Nepal Pragya Pratisthan
- National Talent Award 1996 (2053 BS)
- Lokendra Literary Award 2001
- Motion Picture Award for Best Screenplay 2001
- Garima Prize 2005, awarded by Sajha Prakashan
- National Prize for Best Screenplay- Maina (Nepali film)
- The Diamond Shamsher Memorial Literary Award 2011
- Padmashree Sahitya Puraskar, 2018 (2074 BS) for Yaar
- Karnali Sahitya Samaj Kriti Puraskar, 2020 (2077 BS) for Jiyara

His autobiographical work, Yaar was shortlisted for Madan Puraskar (2074 BS).

== Personal life ==
He is married to Sanu Pandey and has two sons.
