= Dumero =

2020 Nepalese novel by Sarala Gautam

- Cover page of the book
- Author: Sarala Gautam
- Original title: डुमेरो
- Language: Nepali
- Genre: Contemporary fiction
- Publisher: Nepa~laya Publication
- Publication date: Jul 31, 2020
- Publication place: Nepal
- Media type: Print and E-book
- Pages: 328
- ISBN: 9789937937801
- Followed by: Pinjadako Manchhe

Dumero (Nepali: डुमेरो, romanized: Ḍumero, lit. 'restless seeker') is a Nepali novel by Sarala Gautam. It was published on July 31, 2020 by Nepa~laya Publication. This is the debut book of the author who is a journalist and has been covering socio-political issues in her articles.

== Synopsis ==
It is a coming-of-age story a girl from a small town in Nepal and her struggle to find an identity in this world. The book is about a girl called Simran and her wandering aspirations. Simran is a radio journalist but without earning much experience, she joins television. She starts working as an actress in television shows. Without much acting experience, she wins a national award in acting. She becomes a well-known actress and her demand increases in the industry due to which her ego slowly increases. She falls in love with two boys. She gets an oppurtnity to visit abroad and she settles there during her visit, directs a movie which becomes featured in Cannes film festival.

== Theme ==
Dumero illustrates the wandering aspirations and dreams of young people. The book also highlights patriarchy and gender inequality present in Nepali society.

== Release ==
The book was launched as a part of 2020 series of Nepa~laya publication which featured books of four women writers. The other books are Singha Durbarko Ghumne Mech by Dr. Sudha Sharma, Parityakta by Bhuwan Dhungana and Kumari Prashnaharu by Durga Karki. It is the debut novel of the writer.

== See also ==
- Kumari Prashnaharu
- Parityakta
- Singha Durbarko Ghumne Mech
