= Nawaraj Parajuli =

Nepalese poet (born 1987)

- नवराज पराजुली
- Born: 11 February 1987 (age 39); Jhapa, Nepal
- Education: M.ED in English Education
- Alma mater: Tribhuvan University
- Occupations: Poet, lecturer, artist
- Known for: Poetry
- Notable work: Sagarmatha Ko Gahirai
- Parents: Hari Prasad Parajuli (father); Laxmi Devi Parajuli (mother)
- Awards: Nepal Slam Poetry 2014 (Winner); Padmashree Sahitya Puraskar (Winner)

Nawaraj Parajuli (Nepali: नवराज पराजुली) is a Nepalese poet. He is best known for popularizing the slam poetry genre in Nepal.

In 2017, a collection of his poems titled Sagarmatha Ko Gahirai was published. His anthology of poetry Sagarmatha ko Gahirai was awarded the 2017 Padmashree Award by the Khemkala-Harikala Lamichhane Foundation. Sagarmatha ko Gahirahi was also nominated for the Madan Puraskar award.

== Biography ==
He was born to father Hari Prasad Parajuli and mother Laxmi Devi Parajuli in 1987 in Jhapa, Nepal. He received an M.Ed. in English Education from Tribhuvan University.

== Concert tours ==
Parajauli went on a six-city tour of Australia in 2017, accompanied by flutist Samyak Maharjan, guitarist Chet Pun and poet Shuvechchhya Pradhan. At the event in Sydney, the organisers also honoured his contributions to Nepali language and literature. He went on a poetry tour of the United Kingdom in 2018, to support children who were affected during the Nepalese Civil War.

== Acting ==
He acted in the play Malini when it toured Europe in 2017, along with Rajendra Shrestha, Sujan Oli, Dipesh Rai, Jeni Subedi, Dilip Ranabhat and Bipul Pandey .

== Books ==
- Sagarmatha Ko Gahirai (2017)

== Awards and recognition ==
- Winner, Nepal Slam Poetry 2014
- Padmashree Sahitya Puraskar for Sagarmatha ko Gahirai
