= Kumari Prashnaharu =

Nepali short story collection by Durga Karki

- Cover page of the book
- Author: Durga Karki
- Original title: कुमारी प्रश्नहरु
- Language: Nepali
- Genre: Short stories
- Published: February 21, 2020
- Publisher: Nepa~laya Publication
- Publication date: February 21, 2020
- Publication place: Nepal
- Media type: Print, E-book
- ISBN: 9789937932097
- Website: Official website

Kumari Prashnaharu (Nepali: कुमारी प्रश्नहरु, romanized: Kumārī praśnaharū, lit. 'Maiden questions') is a Nepali short stories collection by Durga Karki. It was published on February 21, 2020 by Nepa-laya publication. The book is a collection of 13 short stories. The major themes of the stories are social realism and feminism. The stories highlights the social and gender inequality in Nepali society.

== Background ==
It is the debut book of the writer. The book was launched as a part of 2020 series of Nepalaya publication which featured books of four women writers. The other books are Singha Durbarko Ghumne Mech by Dr. Sudha Sharma, Parityakta by Bhuwan Dhungana and Dumero by Sarala Gautam. The book was launched jointly by Ambassador of Britain to Nepal Nicola Pollitt and journalist Ameet Dhakal in Nepalaya's 'r' shala in Kalikasthan, Kathmandu.

The titles of the thirteen stories included in the collection are:

- Light Balne Keto
- Chowmein
- Family Photo
- Nirdishta Part Two
- Kumari Prashnaharu
- Kalo Chasma
- Aduwa
- Manmaya
- Ragat
- Poila
- Sanghar
- Sathe
- Paanch Second

== Reception ==
The book received mostly positive receptions from critics. Agyat Luitel of Shilapatra, an online news site, praised the novelty factor of the stories but criticized the cliches plots in some stories. Bishal Babu Basnet of eKagaj online news site praised the literary maturity that the writer achieved in her debut work.

== See also ==
- Dumero
- Parityakta
- Singha Durbarko Ghumne Mech
- Shirishko Phool
