= Singha Durbarko Ghumne Mech =

2020 memoir by Dr. Sudha Sharma

- Cover of the book features the gate of Singha Durbar
- Author: Dr. Sudha Sharma
- Original title: सिंहदरबारको घुम्ने मेच
- Language: Nepali
- Genre: Autobiography
- Published: October 17, 2020
- Publisher: Nepa~laya Publication
- Publication place: Nepal
- Media type: Paperback
- Pages: 216
- ISBN: 9789937937825
- Website: Official website

Singha Durbarko Ghumne Mech (Nepali: सिंहदरबारको घुम्ने मेच, lit. 'Revolving Chair of Singha Durbar') is a memoir by Dr. Sudha Sharma Gautam. Dr. Sharma is an Obstetrician and Gynecologist by profession and served as Secretary at the Ministry of Health and Population (MoHP) from October 2008 to December 2011.

== Synopsis ==
The book is based on the author's struggle against patriarchal society and bureaucracy of Nepal. It chronicles Dr. Sharma's role as one of the few women secretaries in the government after the 2006 revolution. The book spans over six and a half decades of the author's life.

== Release ==
It was published on October 17, 2020 by Nepa~laya Publication. It was unveiled by the former President of Nepal, Dr. Ram Baran Yadav. The book was released as a part of Women series of Nepa~laya publication alongside Dumero by Sarala Gautam, Kumari Prashnaharu by Durga Karki and Parityakta by Bhuwan Dhungana.

== Reception ==
Madan Kumar Bhattarai in his review for The Kathmandu Post called the book as "informative". Shrimak Baral praised the book as "read-worthy and collect-worthy" in his review for eNepalese online magazine.

== See also ==
- Dumero
- Jiwan Kada Ki Phool
- Kumari Prashnaharu
- Parityakta
