= Karodaun Kasturi =

2015 novel by Amar Neupane

- Author: Amar Neupane
- Original title: करोडौं कस्तूरी
- Language: Nepali
- Subject: Hari Bansha Acharya
- Genre: fiction
- Set in: 2000s
- Published: April 2015
- Publisher: Fineprint Books
- Publication place: Nepal
- English publication date: 2015
- ISBN: 9789937893145

Karodaun Kasturi is widely mistaken for being the life story of famous actor/ director Hari Bansha Acharya of Nepal. Rather, it is a fictional novel about how his life would have been if he had not discovered his talent as a comedian. The novel sends out a simple yet powerful message of following your passion.

== Synopsis ==
"Kasturi" is an animal which has a special "bina". The smell of this bina is very sweet and magical. There is a popular metaphor that this animal runs behind its own smell without knowing that the smell is actually coming from itself. The writer has done an excellent job picking the metaphor as its title and makes the whole novel even more relevant.

It is written by Amar Neupane who was awarded the Madan Puraskar. It is still popular among teenagers and adults because it is a blend of drama, struggle, and dream. Furthermore, it carries the message that each human is born with a special quality and, if recognised, in time can lead to the treasure of success.

== Characters ==
- Hari
