= Neelam Karki Niharika =

Nepali writer

- नीलम कार्की निहारिका
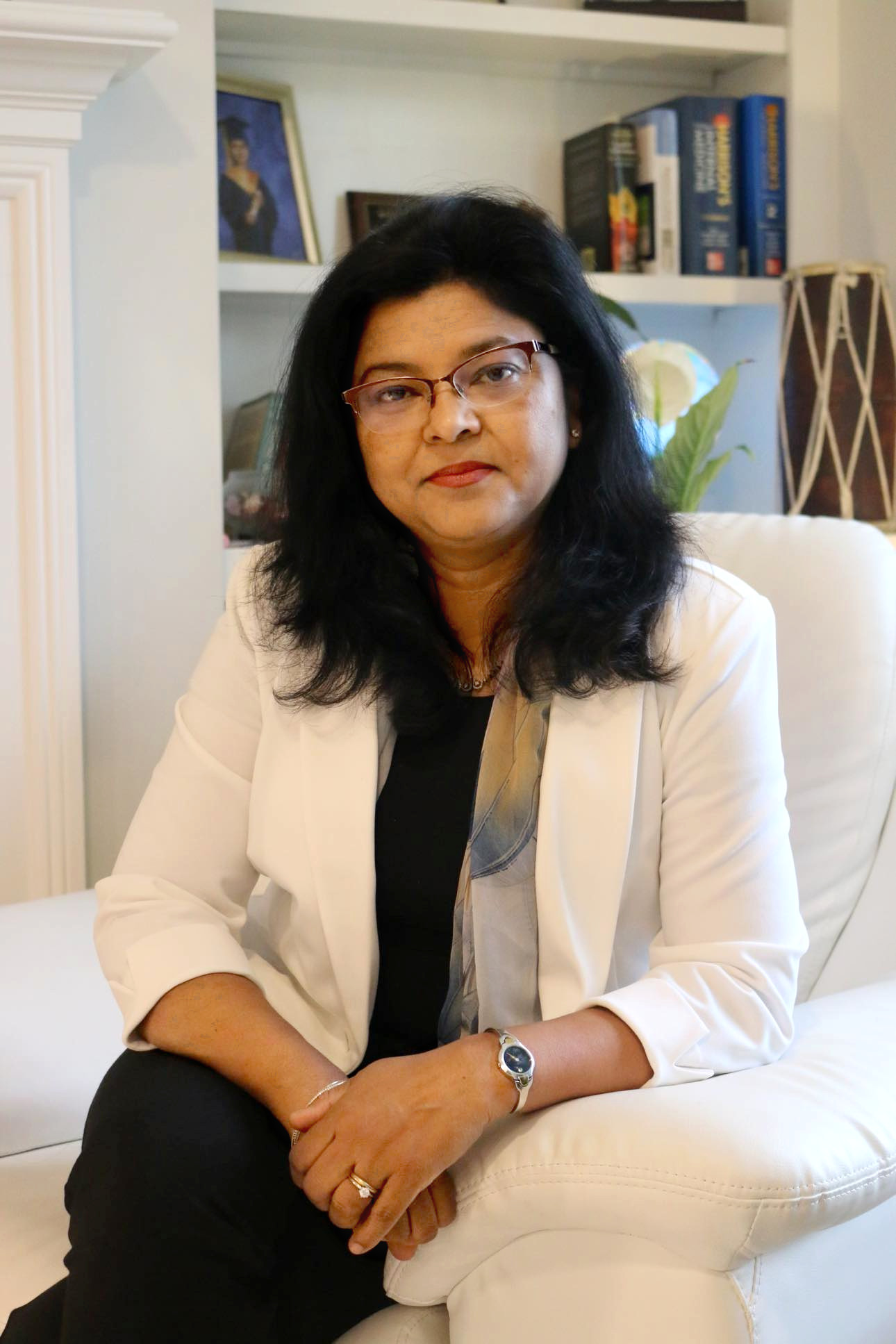
- Born: 9 April 1975 (age 51)
- Education: Tribhuvan University
- Occupation: Writer
- Years active: 1994–Present
- Notable work: Yogmaya, Cheerharan
- Awards: Madan Puraskar

Neelam Karki Niharika (Nepali: नीलम कार्की निहारिका) (born April 9, 1975) is a Nepalese award-winning novelist, poet and short-story writer. She is best known for writing Beli, Hawaan, Cheerharan, Draupadi Abashesh, and Yogmaya. Her first novel Maun Jeevan was published in 1994.

== Literary career ==
Her works are highly sought by newspapers, television and radio media. Her popularity extends beyond Nepal, especially in Nepali communities abroad. Her themes commonly cover male-dominated society, caste, class, poverty, corruption, and tyranny from a historical perspective. She cites Parijat as an inspiration and influence in her books.

=== Yogmaya ===
Yogmaya is one of her most popular works. Yogmaya is based on the life of female protagonist Yogmaya Neupane (1860–1941), a religious leader and women rights activists born in Bhojpur, who fought against the autocratic Rana regime. Karki's research and book is attributed to being a large influence on bringing Yogmaya to the Nepali mainstream.

== Publications ==
| Year | Title | Original title | Genre | Note |
|---|---|---|---|---|
| 1994 | Maun Jeevan | मौन जीवन | Novel | |
| 1997 | Niyatiko Khel | नियतिको खेल | Novel | |
| 2006 | Hawan | हवन | Story Collection | |
| 2006 | Mastikska Jworo | मस्तिष्क ज्वरो | Long Poem | |
| 2006 | Neelam Karki Niharika Ka Kabita | नीलम कार्की निहारिकाका कविता | Story Collection | |
| 2007 | Kagaj Ma Dastakhat | कागजमा दस्तखत | Story Collection | |
| 2012 | Beli | बेली | Story Collection | |
| 2014 | Arki Aaimee | अर्की आइमाई | Novel | |
| 2016 | Cheerharan | चीरहरण | Novel | Winner—Padmashree Sahitya Puraskar, 2016; Nominee—Madan Puraskar, 2016 |
| 2018 | Yogmaya | योगमाया | Novel | Winner—Madan Puraskar, 2018 |
| 2019 | 43 Katha | ४३ कथा | Story Collection | |
| 2021 | Draupadi Avashesh | द्रौपदी अवशेष | Novel | |
| 2026 | Rajmata | राजमाता | Novel | |

== Awards ==
Neelam won Padmashree Sahitya Puraskar for her novel Cheerharan in 2016. The novel was also shortlisted for Madan Puraskar.

Neelam won the Madan Puraskar for her novel Yogmaya in 2018. She is the fourth woman writer to win that award.

Neelam won "The Yogmaya National Award" of 2025 awarded by the Ministry of Culture, Tourism, and Civil Aviation of Nepal Government. It was awarded to honor her work in literature, with the specific award recognizing her novel Yogmaya.
