= Phirphire =

Phirphire फिरफिरे
- [ Shukla Gandaki Municipality ]
- Location in Nepal Phirphire (Nepal)
- Coordinates: 28.09°N 84.01°E
- Country: Nepal
- Zone: Gandaki Zone
- District: Tanahu District

Population (1991)
  - Total: 4,130
- Time zone: UTC+5:45 (Nepal Time)
- Ward number: 12

Phirphire is a populated place located in Shuklagandaki in Tanahu District in the Gandaki Zone of central Nepal. At the time of the 1991 Nepal census it had a population of 4130 people living in 762 individual households.
