= Parityakta =

2020 Nepali book by Bhuwan Dhungana

- Cover page of the 1st edition
- Author: Bhuwan Dhungana
- Original title: परित्यक्ता
- Language: Nepali
- Genre: Fiction
- Publisher: Nepa~laya Publication
- Publication date: June 28, 2020
- Publication place: Nepal
- Media type: Print (Paperback)
- Pages: 146
- ISBN: 9789937937818
- OCLC: 1233025028
- Preceded by: Yuddha ko Ghosana Garnu Vanda Aghi (1992)
- Website: Official page

Parityakta (Nepali: परित्यक्ता, romanized: Parityaktā, lit. 'Grass widow') is a Nepali language novel by Bhuwan Dhungana. It was published on June 28, 2020 by Nepa~laya Publication. It was nominated for Madan Puraskar for the year 2076 BS, one of the most prestigious literary award in Nepal.

== Synopsis ==
The book shows the inner thoughts of a woman in a patriarchal Nepali society and how she deals with loneliness. It is written in first person stream of consciousness narrative.

== Release ==
It is the first novel of the writer who has been active in the Nepali literary scene since 1970. The release of the book was delayed due to the COVID-19 lockdown. The book was launched as a part of 2020 series of Nepalaya publication which featured books of four women writers. The other books are Singha Durbarko Ghumne Mech by Dr. Sudha Sharma, Kumari Prashnaharu by Durga Karki and Dumero by Sarala Gautam.

== Reception ==
The book was nominated for Madan Puraskar for the year 2076 BS.

== See also ==
- Shirishko Phool
- Singha Durbarko Ghumne Mech
- Jiwan Kada Ki Phool
- Maharani
