= Ular (book) =

Nepali novella by Nayan Raj Pandey

- Cover page of the first edition
- Author: Nayan Raj Pandey
- Original title: उलार
- Language: Nepali
- Genre: Fiction
- Publisher: FinePrint
- Publication date: 1998
- Publication place: Nepal
- Media type: Print (Paperback)
- Pages: 80
- ISBN: 9789937804639
- Preceded by: Atirikta
- Followed by: Nidaye Jagadamba

Ular (Nepali: उलार) is a Nepali novella by Nayan Raj Pandey. It was first published in Tanneri—a bi–monthly magazine in 1996 (2053 BS) then as a book in 1998 (2055 BS) by Tanneri Prakshan. The book was reprinted in 2012 by FinePrint Publication which has been printing the book ever since. Pandey completed writing the book in four days.

The title of the book translates to imbalance in a horse-cart caused by more load at the back than at the front. The book has been immensely popular since its publication and has been reprinted multiple times. The book shows the social inequality in Nepali society and how poor people are exploited by richer and powerful ones. The exploitation of subaltern people and the negligence of the state towards those people is depicted in this book. The book has also been included in the curriculum of undergraduate of Nepali Major in Tribhuvan University.

== Synopsis ==
The story is set in Mid-western Terai region (present–day Lumbini Province) of Nepal. Premlawla is a poor tanga driver and is a supporter of Rajendra Lal in the national election. Premlawla also participates in the election rally for Premlalwa with his tanga during which his horse gets sick. However, Rajendra Lal loses to Shanti Raja in the election. Premlawla is asked to participate in the victory rally of Shanti Raja with the promise of a daily wage but Premlawla's sick horse dies during the rally. Premlawla decides to ask for help with Shanti Lal but is unable to meet with him since he has already left for Kathmandu. Then Premlawla decides to ask Rajendra Lal but Rajendra Lal refuses to help. Instead, Rajendra Lal suggests to him that he sell his only piece of land. Premlawla is cheated on the price of land. With the money obtained, Premlawla decides to go to Kathmandu to meet Shanti Lal and ask for his horse's compensation. In Kathmandu, Premlalwa meets a writer Nirakar Prasad, who borrows money with Premlawla promising to return soon and also to publish his story but Nirakar Prasad runs away with the money.

In parallel, there is a story about Draupadi, a sex worker from Badi community and Premlawla's love interest. Premlalwa wants to marry Draupadi but is unable because he is destitute. Draupadi is exploited by the richer people of the village. The books shows the helplessness of poor people in the society and how they are exploited by the rich and powerful.

== Characters ==
- Premlawla, a poor tanga driver
- Rajendra Lal, a local politician
- Shanti Raja, Rajendra Lal's rival
- Draupadi, a sex worker from Badi community and Premlawla's romantic interest
- Sita, Draupadi's mother
- Nirakar Prasad, a writer Premlalwa meets in Kathmandu

== Translation and adaptation ==
An English translation is reportedly in the works.

The novella was adapted into a play by Garden Theatre Production in collaboration with Katha Ghera. The play was staged at Kausi Theatre and directed by Che Shankar. Sabeer Churaute and Sarita Giri depicted the role of Premlawa and Draupadi respectively.
