= Gauri (epic) =

Epic Nepali poem by Madhav Prasad Ghimire

- Cover page of the book
- Author: Madhav Prasad Ghimire
- Original title: गाैरी
- Language: Nepali
- Genre: Poetry
- Set in: Kathmandu
- Published: 1959
- Publisher: Sajha Prakashan
- Publication place: Nepal
- Media type: Book
- ISBN: 9789993329756

Gauri (Nepali: गौरी; first edition: 2015 BS (1959–60 AD) (Note: A Bikram Sambat year begins mid-April)) is an eponymous tragic epic written by Nepali "National Poet" (Nepali: राष्ट्रकवि) Madhav Prasad Ghimire, in memory of his first wife, following her premature death. It is widely regarded as one of the poet's finest works; it is also the most popular. Ghimire has named Gauri as one of his favourites, among his works.

== Inspiration ==
Madhav Prasad Ghimire, at fifteen years of age, was married to his first wife Gauri Pokharel, herself aged only ten, in 1990 BS. She died after eleven years of marriage in which they had two children together.

== Development ==
In Mādhava Ghimirekā viśishṭa khaṇḍakāvya, Bhanubhakta Pokharel opined that most of the epic seems to have been completed by 2005 BS.

== Adaptation ==
A music album of the epic was released which was sung by artist like Ram Krishna Dhakal, Sudesh Sharma, Sangeeta Pradhan Rana, Rambhakta Jojiju, Sapana Shree and the poet himself. The album was released by Music Nepal music company.

== Translation ==
A Korean translation of Gauri was published in 2018.

== See also ==
- Malati Mangale
- Muna Madan
- Prithviraj Chauhan
