= Agniko Katha =

Nepali play by Abhi Subedi

- Written by: Abhi Subedi
- Original language: Nepali
- Genre: Drama
- Setting: Monastery

Premiere
- Date premiered: 2003
- Place premiered: Aarohan Theatre, Kathmandu

Agniko Katha (Nepali:अग्निको कथा]) is a play in Nepali by Abhi Subedi.

Aarohan Theatre prepared Agniko Katha for stage show for the first time in 2003 and performed at its own theatre in Kathmandu. Later, the play was taken abroad for shows in other Asian countries and Europe. Aarohan staged this play more than a hundred times at different locations worldwide. Sunil Pokharel was the director of this play.

== See also ==
- Baikuntha Express
- Malati Mangale
- Yajnaseni
- Ghero
