= Prithviraj Chauhan (epic) =

Nepali epic by Laxmi Prasad Devkota

- Cover page
- Author: Laxmi Prasad Devkota
- Original title: पृथ्वीराज चौहान
- Cover artist: Tekbir Mukhiya
- Language: Nepali
- Genre: Historical epic
- Publisher: Sajha Prakashan
- Publication date: c. 1992–93
- Publication place: Nepal
- Media type: Print
- Pages: 184
- Award: Sajha Puraskar
- ISBN: 9993325104
- OCLC: 611879243

Prithiviraj Chauhan (Nepali: पृथ्वीराज चौहान) is a Nepali-language epic (mahakavya) by Mahakavi Laxmi Prasad Devkota. It was written in 1946 and was published in 2049 BS (c. 1992- 1993) by Sajha Prakashan. It is based on the life of Prithviraj Chauhan. It is one of the six mahakavya composed by the poet. It is written in Jhyaure chhanda (folk Nepali metre).

== Background ==
It is estimated that Devkota wrote this epic in 1946 when he was a lecturer at Tri-Chandra College. It was published posthumously by the publication itself. The manuscript was kept away in some place for many years. There were lots of scribbling in the manuscript. The publishing housed contacted the copyeditor, Shyam Das Vaishnav and Devkota's son Padma Devkota for their help. In the manuscript among the 16 cantos, the 15th canto was missing. According to copyeditor, Devkota had planned to write the 15th canto but did not and he copied the manuscript as it was. The publishing house itself took care of the situation and realigned the epic into 21 cantos.

== Synopsis ==
The epic consists of 21 cantos. It is based on the life of Prithviraj Chauhan, a North Indian king of Chauhan dynasty who reigned from c. 1178 to c. 1192 CE. The epic was written to illustrate the medieval Indian feudal society.

== Reception ==
The book won the prestigious Sajha Puraskar for the year 2049 BS (c. 1992- 1993) which is awarded annually by the publication for the best book published within the publication house.

== See also ==
- Muna Madan
- Champa
- Shakuntala
