= Muna Madan (disambiguation) =

Muna Madan is a narrative poetry book by Laxmi Prasad Devkota.

Muna Madan may also refer to:

- Muna Madan (film), 2003 film
- Romeo & Muna, 2018 film
