= The Witch Doctor and Other Essays =

Book by Laxmi Prasad Devkota

- Cover page of the book
- Author: Laxmi Prasad Devkota
- Language: English
- Genre: Essays
- Publisher: Sangri-La Books
- Publication date: November 11, 2017
- Publication place: Nepal
- Media type: Print (Paperback)
- Pages: 219
- ISBN: 9789937708050
- OCLC: 1031051291

The Witch Doctor and Other Essays is an anthology of essays written by Laxmi Prasad Devkota. It was published on November 11, 2017, by Sangri-La Books. The book consists of 30 essays. Although Devkota primarily wrote in Nepali, he wrote the essays in the collection in English. This is the fifty-ninth book of the author and was published posthumously by his son Padma Devkota.

== Synopsis ==
The major subject of the essays ranges from animals to Nepalese society to stars and different human lifestyles. The essays were written in and around 1958 in Devokta's last years.

== Reception ==
The book was released on the 108th birth anniversary of the poet. Prof. Michael J. Hutt called the essays "powerful resonance for present-day Nepal" in an article for The Record magazine.

== See also ==
- Muna Madan
- Shakuntala
- Abstract Chintan Pyaj
