= Lok Priya Devi =

Nepalese poet

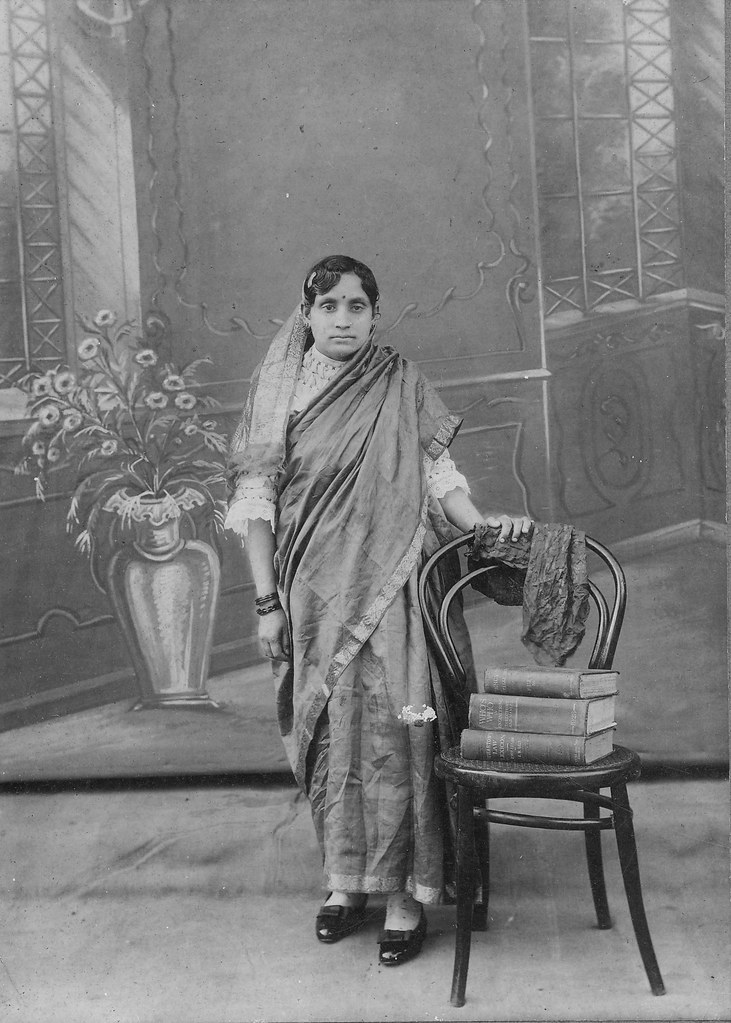
- Born: 1898; Kathmandu, Nepal
- Died: 1960 (aged 61–62); Nepal
- Relatives: Laxmi Prasad Devkota (brother)

Lok Priya Devi (Nepali: लोकप्रियादेवी; 1898–1960) was a Nepalese poet. In 2014, she was recognised as one of the women who contributed to the arena of Nepali literature, art, and politics. She is the sister of Laxmi Prasad Devkota, the nation's most adored poet.

== Biography ==
Devi was born in 1898 in Dilli Bazar, Kathmandu, Nepal to Teel Madhav Devkota, and Amar Rajya Lakshmi Devi. Devi was a sister of Laxmi Prasad Devkota, who is considered to be the greatest literary figure in Nepal.

In 1906 at the age of eight years, Devi was married to businessman Lok Nath Joshi. They had five sons and three daughters, however, Joshi was known to be a womaniser and he had many concubines. Devi is never known to have criticised her husband. Devi's name "Lok Priya" was given to her by Joshi which means "darling of Lok Nath".

== Works ==
Her brother Devkota used to encourage her to write poems. She was a student of Lekhnath Paudyal and Chakrapani Chalise. Devi's works were also praised by various writers including Prem Rajeshwari Devi, Goma, and Devkota.

She mostly published her poems in Sharada magazine, and she also published in Udyog, Sahity Shrot, and the literary supplements to the national newspaper Gorkhapatra. Devi was also an activist, she advocated and encouraged women to get an education. In 1953, she organised a literacy event for Bhanubhakta Acharya.

In 1983, her daughter Shashi Rimal, compiled and published Collected Poems of Poetess Lokpriya Devi. Lok Priya Devi Puraskar is named in her honour.

== Awards and recognitions ==
In 2014, she was recognised one of the women "who contributed to the arena of Nepali literature, art, and politics. Much of their lives have been excluded [or written very little] from the narratives of official records", alongside Ambalika Devi Chandrakala Devi, Mangala Devi, and Divya Koirala.

She died in 1960.

== Works ==
- Shoka Bindu
- Tears of Sorrow on Brother’s Demise
- Collected Poems of Poetess Lokpriya Devi
- Reply to Shanta
