= Baikuntha Express =

1985 Nepali play by Mohan Raj Sharma

- Cover page of the book
- Author: Mohan Raj Sharma
- Original title: वैकुण्ठ एक्सप्रेस
- Language: Nepali
- Genre: Play
- Publisher: Sajha Prakashan
- Publication date: 1985 (2042 BS)
- Publication place: Nepal
- Media type: Print
- Pages: 90
- Awards: Madan Puraskar
- ISBN: 978-99933-41-68-0

Baikuntha Express (Nepali:वैकुण्ठ एक्सप्रेस) is a play written by Mohan Raj Sharma . It was published in 1985 by Sajha Prakashan. The book was awarded Madan Puraskar in 2042 BS.

== Synopsis ==
The play portrays a story of a travel in a mini bus. The bus has a driver, a helper and 17 passengers, and it is going to Baikuntha (the paradise). During the play, the bus keeps on moving and various events occur inside as the bus passes through various imaginary places.

== Reception ==
The book received the Madan Puraskar for 2042 BS (c. 1985).

== See also ==
- Malati Mangale
- Muna Madan
- Agniko Katha
