= Aina (book) =

2016 book by Ramlal Joshi

- Cover page
- Author: Ramlal Joshi
- Original title: ऐना
- Language: Nepali
- Genre: non-Fiction
- Published: 2016
- Publisher: Brother Books
- Publication date: March 2016
- Publication place: Nepal
- Media type: Print (Paperback)
- Pages: 255
- Awards: Madan Puraskar
- ISBN: 9789937891660
- Preceded by: Hatkela ma Aakash
- Followed by: Sakhi

Aina (Nepali: ऐना, lit. 'Mirror') is a collection of short stories by Ramlal Joshi. The book was published in 2016 by Brother books. This is the second book of the author who had previously published a ghazal collection called Hatkela ma Aakash. The book won the 2016 Madan Puraskar.

== Synopsis ==
The book is a collection of nineteen short stories reflecting the dark realities of poor people of remote district of Far-Western region of Nepal. The book depicts the various aspects of people living in that region.

== Reception ==
The book won the prestigious Madan Puraskar for 2073 BS (2016). A cash prize of Rs. 200,000 was provided with the award.

== See also ==
- Karnali Blues
- Chhapamar ko Chhoro
- Kumari Prashnaharu
