= Gyanendra Deuja =

Nepali film director

Gyanendra Bahadur Deuja
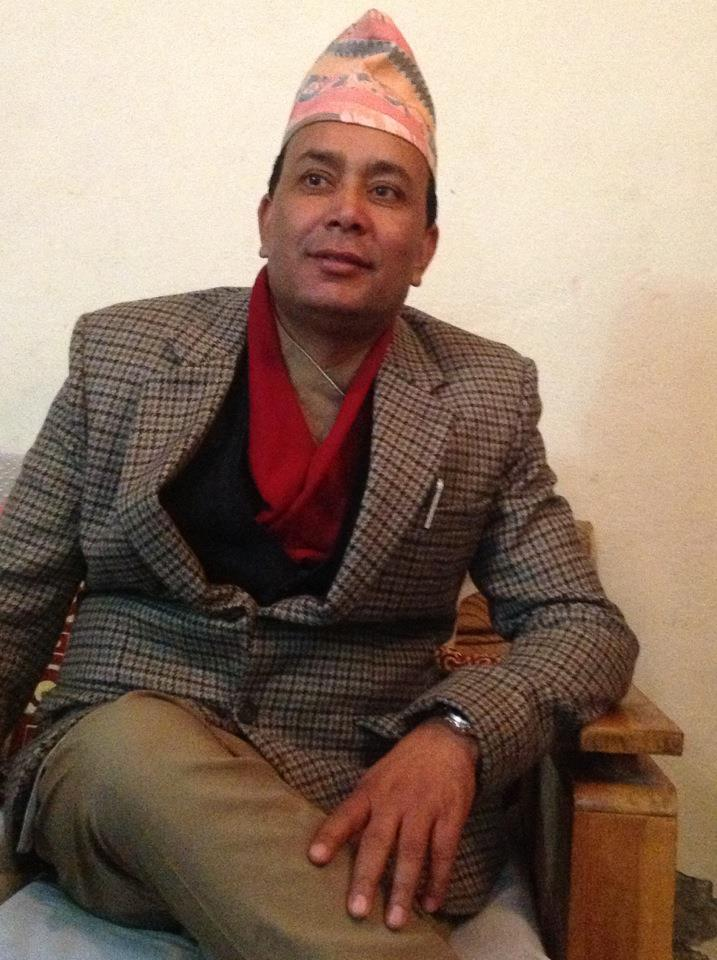
- Born: 5 May 1967 (age 59); Kapan, Nepal
- Occupation: Director
- Years active: 1997–present
- Children: Sulav Pratik Deuja; Samikshya Deuja

Gyanendra Deuja (born 5 May 1967) (Nepali: ज्ञानेन्द्र देउजा) is a retired officer of Nepal Rastra Bank - the central bank of Nepal and a Nepali film Producer, Director and Screenwriter. He directed his first movie, Rakshak, in 1997. It contained the first instance of an underwater action sequence ever shot in a Nepali movie. He then started adding a novelty to each of his movies. One of his notable movies is Muna Madan (Nepali: मुनामदन) based on the long poem of the same name by Laxmi Prasad Devkota. This movie was Nepal's submission for Best Foreign Language Film at the 2004 Oscars. As of June 2025, he is preparing to start shooting his next film Jhingedaau - 2, which is a to his 2022 release jhingedaau. While jhingedaau was based on a timeless one act play of Bhim Nidhi Tiwari; Jhingedaau 2 is his own take on continuance of the open ended story.

== Career ==
With the establishment of Nepal television in the early 1980s, many of the theater artists transitioned to making soap opera. He started taking minor roles and working as production assistant as well. when he was doing some educational awareness program for the TV, he met Resh Raj Acharya - a senior movie director who later mentored him. Mr. Deuja worked as chief assistant director in tele-serials like Sparsh, Dushman, Aama, etc. and celluloid feature films like Tuhuro, Bandhan, Aama with Mr. Acharya.

== Filmography ==
Year	Title
1997	Rakshak
1999	Gorkhali
2000	Daagbatti
2002-2003	Muna Madan
2004	Kurukshetra
2006	Barmala
2006	Lavkush
2007	Hami Taxi Driver
2008	Dewar Babu
2009	Rana Sangram
2010	Hifajat
2010	Khusi
2011	Chhabilal Kanjus Chaina
2013-2016	Buddha Born in Nepal
2022	Jhingedaau
2024	Upahaar - The Journey of Life
2025	Jhingedaau - 2 (Work in Progress)

=== Television ===
Deuja has also done work in television:

- Golmaal,
- Aankna Khulyo,
- Ghaito Ma Gham,
- Shayogi,
- Asal Upaya,
- Kamaiya.

== Awards ==
- Nomination of Muna-Madan in 76thOscar Awards-2003
- Participated in Palm springs film festival- 2004
- Prakash Thapa Memorial Award- 2007 Awarded for the most successful Director of the Year for the movie Dewar-Babu (from Nepal films producers association)
- KTV Film Award -2008 Awarded as the Best Director for the movie Dewar-Babu.
- 5th NEFTA TTV Award-2011 Nominated in Best director category for the movie Rana-Sangram.
- Samjhana digital film award- 2010 Nominated in Best Director category for the movie Hifajat

== Personal life ==
He is married to Rosani Adhikari Deuja. He has a son, Sulav Pratik Deuja and a daughter, Samikshya Deuja. Apart from being a screenwriter and director, Mr. Deuja is also a professional banker, having been the deputy Director of Nepal Rastra Bank since 1988.
