= Champa (novel) =

Novel by Laxmi Prasad Devkota

- Author: Laxmi Prasad Devkota
- Original title: चम्पा
- Working title: Nepali Samajik Upanyas
- Cover artist: Tekbir Mukhiya
- Language: Nepali
- Genre: Fiction
- Set in: Kathmandu during the Rana regime
- Publisher: Sajha Publications
- Publication date: 1967–68
- Publication place: Nepal
- Media type: Print (Paperback)
- ISBN: 9789993326526

Champa (Nepali: चम्पा) is the only novel written by Laxmi Prasad Devkota. The book was written around the year 1947–48 and published posthumously 20 years later.

== Synopsis ==
The story describes the life of a 12-year-old girl, Champa, who is married to Ramakanta but being self-reliant, she could not stay her home and she runs away. Due to some disease, the husband cannot have physical contact with the girl. One day he decides to leave home because he fears that if he goes close to his "tempting" wife his life may be at risk. Due to this Champa is blamed by her in-laws. This novel has however no distinct ending.

== Themes ==
The novel is unique among Devkota's works as the only one depicting contemporary social issues and roles of women in society. Set in Kathmandu during the Rana rule, it depicts a society firmly adhering to traditional gender roles, with men engaged in learning and travelling, and women, uneducated and limited to household chores and religious activities.

== Reception ==
Critic Bindu Sharma considers the novel's use of Freudian psychoanalytic theories to explore unequal relationships and conflict within family groundbreaking, and argues that it makes Devkota the first psychological novelist of Nepali literature. Sharma also considers it one of the most important novels of the early period of Nepali novel development (years 1936 – 1960).

== Publication history ==
According to the book's foreword, the manuscript released to the publishers by Nepal Bhasha Pratisthan had arrived with the title "Nepali Samajik Upanyas (lit. 'Nepali Social Novel') on its cover. It was deemed unsuitable, and "Champa" was chosen as the novel's title for publication, in keeping with other works from Devkota many of which are named after the works' respective heroines. The first edition of the novel was published in 2024 BS (AD 1967–68). The second edition was published by Sajha Publications the following year. The third edition was published in 2029 BS, fourth in 2052 BS, fifth in 2055 BS, and the sixth edition was published in 2064 BS.

The cover art for the book was done by Tekbir Mukhiya.

== Translations ==
Champa was translated to Hindi by Dhurablal Sahani. The translation was published some years after the establishment of the Translation Department of Nepal Academy in 2067 BS (AD 2010–11).

== See also ==
- Sumnima
- Muna Madan
- Shakuntala
