= Chhapamar ko Chhoro =

20007 Nepali book by Mahesh Bikram Shah

- First edition
- Author: Mahesh Bikram Shah
- Original title: छापामारको छोरो
- Language: Nepali
- Subject: Maoist insurgency in Nepal
- Genre: Short stories
- Published: 2007
- Publisher: Sajha Prakashan, FinePrint Publication
- Publication date: 2007
- Publication place: Nepal
- Media type: Print
- Pages: 124
- ISBN: 9993327727

Chhapamar ko Chhoro (Nepali: छापामारको छोरो, lit. 'The guerrilla’s son') is a Nepali short story collection by Mahesh Bikram Shah. The book was published in 2007 by Sajha Prakashan. The book won the prestigious Madan Puraskar for the year 2063 BS (2007-2008). The anthology consists of eighteen stories centered around Maoist insurgency in Nepal.

== Background ==
Shah is a police officer. The stories are based on the difficulties of ordinary people during the Maoist insurgency in Nepal.

== Stories ==
Some of the stories included in the anthology are:

- Badhsala ma Buddha [Buddha in a Slaughter House]
- Ma ra Murdaharu [Me and Corpses]
- Ekadeshma [In a Country]
- Babuko Kandh ma Chhoro Sutiraheko Desh [The Country where the Son is Sleeping in the Father’s Shoulder]
- Mero Kukur Aajhai Bhukiraheko Thiyo [My Dog was Still Barking]
- Bandha Dhoka ra Samaya [Closed Door and Time]
- Bandha Dhoka ra Sapanaharu [Broken Door and the Dreams]

== Awards ==
The book was awarded with Madan Puraskar for the year 2063 BS (2007-2008).

== See also ==
- Kumari Prashnaharu
- Nepali Lok Katha
- Baikuntha Express
- Seto Dharti
