= Mahesh Bikram Shah =

Nepalese writer and retired policeman

Mahesh Bikram Shah (Nepali: महेशविक्रम शाह) is author, novelist and winner of Madan Puraskar for his book Chhapamar ko Chhoro of Nepal.Shah is now a retired policeman.

== Bibliography ==
- Jackson Height (ज्याक्सन हाइट)
- Chhapamar ko Chhoro
- African Amigo
- सिपाहीकि स्वास्नी
