= Ambika Prasad Upadhyaya =

Nepalese historian

- अम्बिकाप्रसाद उपाध्याय
- Occupations: Historian, writer
- Notable work: Nepalko Itihas
- Spouse: Ambalika Devi

Ambika Prasad Upadhyaya (Nepali: अम्बिकाप्रसाद उपाध्याय) was a Nepalese historian.

He is best known for writing Nepalko Itihas (1922). Upadhyaya is the first person to write the history of Nepal in the Nepali-language. Upadhyaya was married to Ambalika Devi from 1901 to 1936, till her death.

== Works ==
- Nepalko Itihas (1922)
- Sundar Sarojini
