= Muna Madan (film) =

2003 film

- Directed by: Gyanendra Deuja
- Story by: Laxmi Prasad Devkota
- Based on: Muna Madan by Laxmi Prasad Devkota
- Produced by: Nabaraj Dhakal
- Starring: Usha Poudel; Deepak Tripathi; Subhadra Adhikari; Capt. Vijaya Lama; Mithila Sharma; Neer Shah; Dinesh D.C. Shivahari Poudel
- Production company: N.B.A Chalchitra
- Release date: 27 June 2003 (Nepal)
- Running time: 163 Minutes
- Country: Nepal
- Language: Nepali

Muna Madan is a 2003 Nepalese tragic romance film, directed by Gyanendra Deuja. The film is based on novel of the same name written by Laxmi Prasad Devkota. The film is produced by Nabaraj Dhakal under the banner of N.B.A. Chalchitra. It stars Deepak Tripathi, and Usha Poudel in the lead roles alongside Subhadra Adhikari, Vijaya Lama, Mithila Sharma, Neer Shah, Dinesh D.C., and Shivahari Poudel. The film was selected as the Nepalese entry for the Best Foreign Language Film at the 76th Academy Awards but it was not nominated.

== Plot ==
The movie describes the life of a poor man (Madan) who leaves his wife (Muna) and goes to Lhasa to make money. Madan represents all the youths of Nepal who go abroad to earn money to earn their living. The wife of Madan, Muna is the queen of love and sacrifice. She loves her Madan a lot so she is upset as she has to send him to a place, Lhasa, where there are lots of obstacles and risks. But finally, she accepts this challenge and stays in the country with her mother-in-law who is old and weak.

While returning home, Madan becomes sick on the way. His friends leave him on the road and come back home saying he has died. Finally, he is rescued by a man who is considered to be of a lower caste in Nepal. That is why it is said that a man is said to be great not by caste or race but by a heart full of love and humanity. When Madan returns to Kathmandu after regaining his health, he discovers that his mother and his beloved wife had already died. Madan comes to realize that money is of no value at that point.

== Cast ==
- Deepak Tripathi as Madan
- Usha Poudel as Muna
- Mithila Sharma as Didi
- Capt. Vijaya Lama as Sherpa
- Subhadra Adhikari as Madan's mother
- Dinesh D.C. as Kaji
- Neer Shah as Malik

== Soundtrack ==
#	Song	Singer (s)
1	Asare Mash Ko	Nagendra Shrestha, Deepa Jha
2	Nacha Nacha Sangini	Deepa Jha
3	Udera Janchha	Thubden Bhutia
4	Hey Mera Ram	Sapana Shree
5	Nisthuri Dhana Le	Ram Krishna Dhakal
6	A Meri Muna	Ram Krishna Dhakal
