= Ramlal Joshi =

Nepali author

- रामलाल जोशी
- Occupations: Writer, teacher
- Notable work: Aina (2016)
- Awards: Madan Puraskar (2016)

Ramlal Joshi is a Nepalese writer and educator from Dhangadi. In 2016, he won the Madan Puraskar for his short–story collection, Aina.

Joshi is a resident of Dhangadhi city in Kailali district of Sudurpashchim province. Previously, he had been a political activist, a journalist and a teacher. He had been the chairman of Sudur Paschimanchal Sahitya Samaj, an organization for the promotion of literature and culture in far west region of Nepal.

He began his literary career by publishing a Gazal collection titled Hatkela ma Aakash in 2000 (2057 BS). He received Madan Purskar for his book Aina (i.e., Mirror), an anthology of short stories in Nepali.

He published his second book Sakhi, a novel on 6 October 2018. On 2 September 2022, he published his third book, a second short–story collection titled Ba Aama.

== Bibliography ==
Books
Title	Publication date	Publisher	Genre	Notes
Hatkela ma Aakash	2000		Gazal collection	
Aina	2016	Brothers Books (Independent publisher)	Short–story collection	Winner–Madan Puraskar
Sakhi	2018 October 6	Book Hill Publication	Novel	
Ba Aama	2022 September 2	Book Hill Publication	Short–story collection	
