= Ji Waya La Lachhi Maduni =

Traditional Nepalese song

Kathmandu and Lhasa

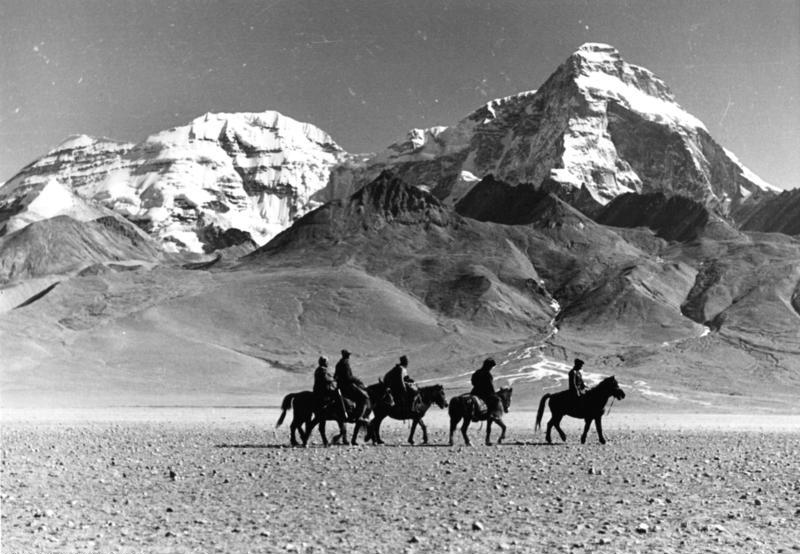
A caravan crossing the Tuna Plain in Tibet in the 1930s.

"Ji Wayā Lā Lachhi Maduni" (Devanagari:जि वया ला लछि मदुनि) ("It hasn't been a month since I came") is a traditional Nepalese song about a Tibet trader and his newly wed bride. The ballad in Nepal Bhasa dates from the late 18th century.

This tragedy song has been cited as the source of "Muna Madan", a short epic story in the Nepali language composed by Laxmi Prasad Devkota in 1936.

== Synopsis ==
The ballad "Ji Wayā Lā Lachhi Maduni" is in the form of a dialogue. There are three persons, husband, wife and mother-in-law. The man is about to leave Kathmandu for Tibet on work.

The song starts with the wife pleading with her mother-in-law to stop him, saying that it's not even been a month since she came to their home and he wants to go away. She offers to hand over her trousseau so that he can start a business in Nepal and not have to go to Tibet. But the husband consoles her that he will be back within a year or two.

He starts on the journey after performing an auspicious ceremony, "accepting the ritual gifts with his right hand and wiping away the tears with his left hand".

A few months pass, there has been no word from him, and the wife sees bad omens. One day, a deceitful friend brings a message that her husband has died in Tibet. Distressed, she expresses her wish to join her husband in death, and commits sati despite her mother-in-law's entreaties not to do so.

Three years later, the son returns home from Tibet. His mother tells him from the window that he can't come inside the house because they have already performed his death rituals. She also tells him that his wife committed sati after hearing that he was dead. The son is shocked, and goes away and becomes an ascetic.

== Background ==
The title of the song "Ji Wayā Lā Lachhi Maduni" means "It hasn't been a month since I came" in Nepal Bhasa. It is a popular seasonal song in Newar society and is sung during the rice planting season.

The song's theme is based on the life and times of the merchants and artisans of Kathmandu who used to go to Tibet for long periods in the past. Known as Lhasa Newar, they operated business houses in Lhasa and other cities and conducted trade between Nepal, India and Tibet. The artisans built temples and created artworks for the monasteries. The tradition goes back centuries.

Wives and families were greatly concerned when the travellers left as they often died on the trek across the Himalaya mountains or of the harsh climate on the Tibetan plateau, and ballads describing their hardships are frequently sung.

== Lyrics ==
The first few lines of the song appear below.

(Wife) Ji wayā lā lachhi maduni, chhi kāya San jhāya dhāla
Thugu chhabār liganā disan nhān.

(Mother-in-law) Ji kāya putā jā ligane majiu, bhalichā
Ji kāya yā lajagā madu nhān.

(Wife) Ayale māju hāya chhi kāya yā lajagār madusā
Jigu kosa lawa lhānā biya nhān.

(Mother-in-law) Ayale bhalichā mayju, dhandā chhanan kāyamate
Dakhalakha jaka chonā wai nhān.

(Wife) Lakha madu pukhulisa ngā gathe choni, māju
Thugu chhabār liganā disan nhān.
Ayale prabhu swāmi, San jhāya dhāya mate
Bhina jā jinan jui matāyā nhān.

(Husband) Ayale misā hāya, tākāl chone makhu
Danchhi nidan jaka chonā waya nhān.

(Wife) Nanānan majisenli jita pār biyā disan
Ji māmyā saranasa wane nhān.

(Husband) Chhanta pār madu misā, jigu chhenyā bhālā chhanta
Bhinaka nidān yānā chonwa nhān.

(Wife) Lakha madu pukhulisa paleswān gathe hoi
Hoigu āshā jita madu nhān.

Shubha dina shubha belā mangal yānā thāsa
Khoya mate dheeraj ni yāwa nhān.
Jawa lhātin sagan phase, khawa lhātin khobi huse
Ji prabhu limasose jhāla nhān.

== Translation ==
(Wife) It hasn't been a month since I came, and your son says he's going to Tibet
Please don't let him go this time.

(Mother-in-law) I cannot forbid him to go, daughter-in-law
He has no work.

(Wife) If your son has no work, mother-in-law
I will hand over my wedding presents.

(Mother-in-law) Oh daughter-in-law, you do not worry
He will be away for just a few years.

(Wife) How will a fish live in a pond without water, mother in-law
Please forbid him to go this time.
Oh husband, do not say you will go to Tibet
I do not see any good happening.

(Husband) Oh wife, I will not stay long
I will stay for just a year or two.

(Wife) Since you will not listen, please give me a divorce
I will go back to my mother.

(Husband) I will not divorce you, you have the responsibility of taking care of my house
Carry out your duties carefully.

(Wife) How will a lotus bloom in a pond without water
I do not expect it to bloom.

At the good luck ceremony during an auspicious hour on an auspicious day
Do not weep, stay calm.
Accepting the ritual gifts with his right hand and wiping away the tears with his left hand
My husband left without looking back.

== See also ==
- Lhasa Newar (trans-Himalayan traders)
