= Vijaya Lama =

Nepalese aviator and actor

Captain Vijaya Lama
- विजय लामा
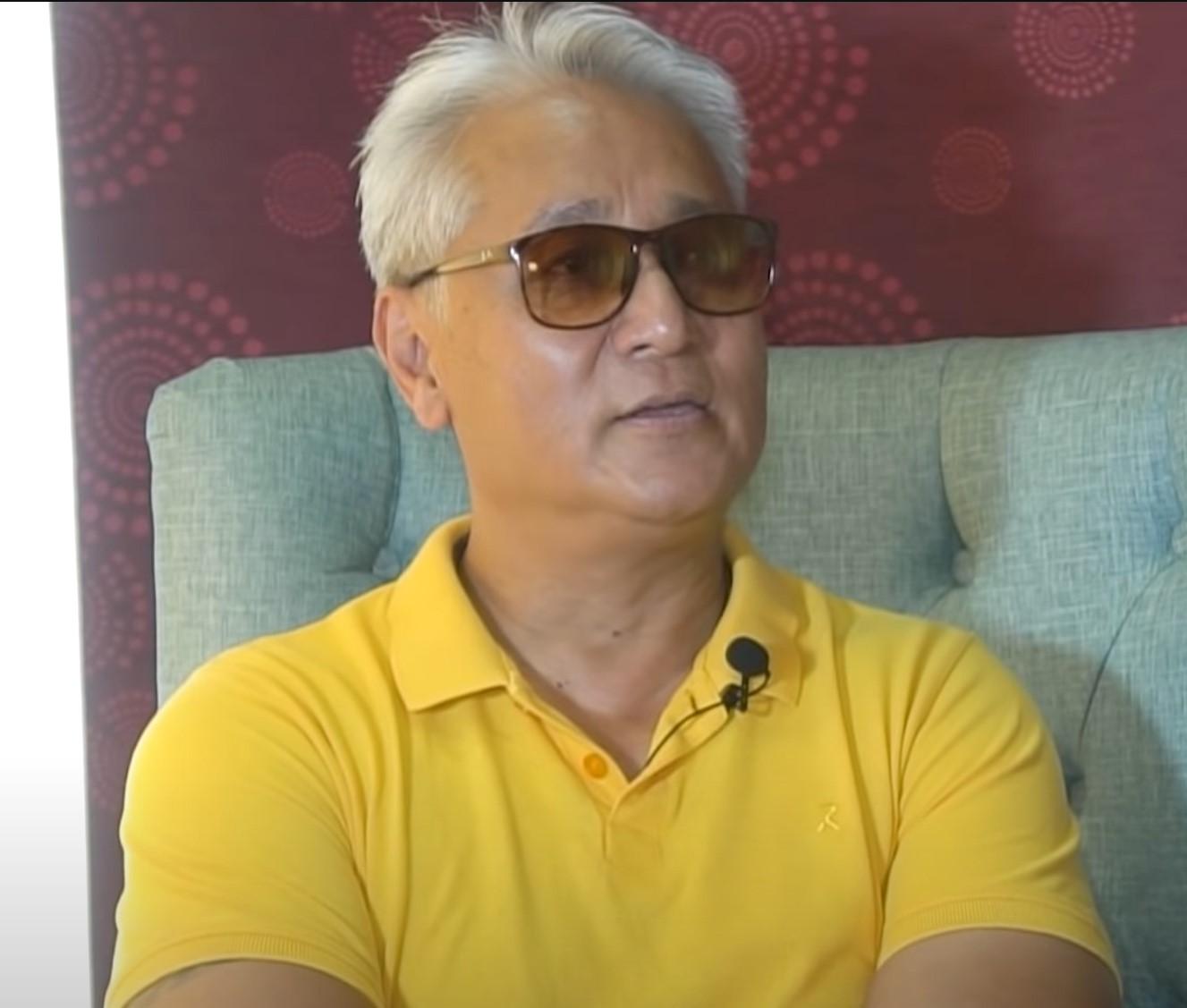
- Born: 7 March 1964 (age 62); Lalitpur, Nepal
- Occupations: Aircraft Pilot, actor, singer and Television Presenter
- Website: www.vijaylama.com

Vijay Lama (Nepali: विजय लामा), also known as Captain Vijay Lama, (born March 7, 1964) is a senior Nepali pilot with more than 25,000 flight hours and one of the first Nepalese pilots to become an instructor on the Airbus A330. He is also an actor, singer, television presenter, and social activist.

He flies as a commercial pilot for Nepal Airlines.

== Acting career ==
He has worked in more than 30 Nepali movies such as Raanko, and Truck Driver. His debut movie was the Nepali film Aadarsha Naari (1984). He appeared in the Hollywood film Everest featuring an ensemble cast including Josh Brolin and Jake Gyllenhaal. He played the role of rescue pilot Col. Madan Khatri Chhetri. Vijaya Lama also participated as a solo singer in Melancholy song by 365 Nepali Artists which set the Guinness World Record for "Most Vocal Solos in a Song Recording".

== Filmography ==
- Aadarsha Nari (1985)
- Koseli (1992)
- Truck Driver (1994)
- Muna Madan (2003)
- Everest (2015)
- Bobby (2018 film)
