= Madhav Prasad Ghimire =

Nepali poet (1919–2020)

Rashtrakavi (National Poet) Madhav Prasad Ghimire
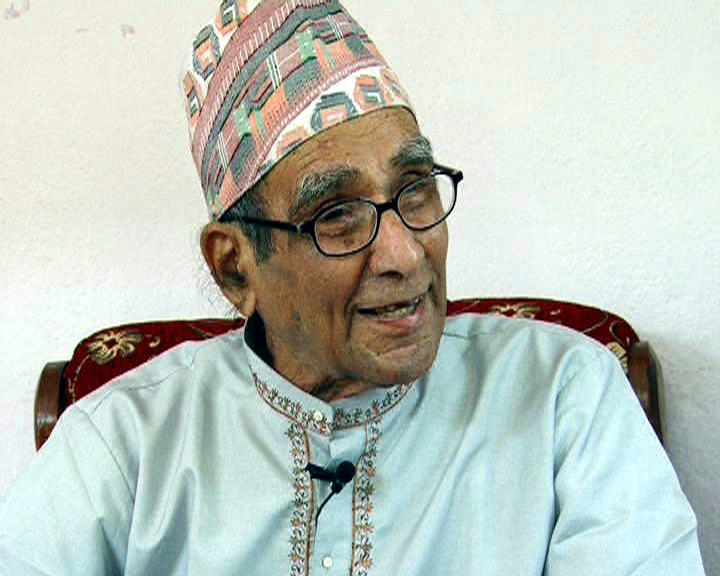
- Born: 23 September 1919 Lamjung, Nepal
- Died: 18 August 2020 (aged 100) Kathmandu, Nepal
- Occupation: poet; songwriter; playwright
- Language: Nepali
- Genre: epic poetry; musical drama; essays; songs
- Subject: nature; romance; patriotism
- Years active: 1934–2020
- Notable works: Malati Mangale, Shakuntala, Himalwaari Himalpaari, Gauri
- Notable awards: Gorkha Dakshinbahu; Tribhuwan Pragya Puraskar Sajha Puraskar
- Spouse: Gauri Ghimire (née Pokharel) (1933–34 to 1947–48), Mahakali Ghimire (1948–2020; his death)
- Children: 8

Madhav Prasad Ghimire (Nepali: माधवप्रसाद घिमिरे; 23 September 1919 – 18 August 2020) was a Nepali poet and scholar. He was honoured by the title Rashtrakavi (Nepali: राष्ट्रकवि; lit. 'National Poet') by the Government of Nepal in 2003. Some of his acclaimed works include Gauri, Malati Mangale, Shakuntala and Himalwari Himalpari.

Born in Lamjung, and educated in Kathmandu and Banaras, Ghimire had a career in literature spanning 86 years in which he wrote epic poems, plays and essays, composed popular songs like "Gaucha Geet Nepali" and "Nepali Hami Rahaula Kaha", and contributed to and edited literary journals and newspapers. He was the Vice Chancellor of the Royal Nepal Academy for 10 years and Chancellor for two more. He was composing another one of his epics, Ritambhara, when he died of respiratory problems in August 2020, aged 100. He was a recipient of the Order of Gorkha Dakshina Bahu, Tribhuwan Pragya Puraskar and Sajha Puraskar, among others.

== Early life ==
Ghimire was born on 7 Ashoj, 1976 BS or 23 September 1919 CE in a village named pustun in the Lamjung district of Nepal. His mother died when he was three years old. Ghimire was brought up by his father, Gauri Shankar Ghimire, and his grandmother. He learned to read at the age of six and learned the Panchanga, the Hindu calendar and almanac, from a man named Fulebaba at the age of 8 or 9. He left his home at the age of 11 and went to Duredada village to study Sanskrit. Afterwards, he migrated to Kathmandu to study at Sanskrit Pradhan Pathshala and Tindhara Sanskrit Pathsala. He then left for India for his further studies, and also studied in Banaras for a time.

== Career ==
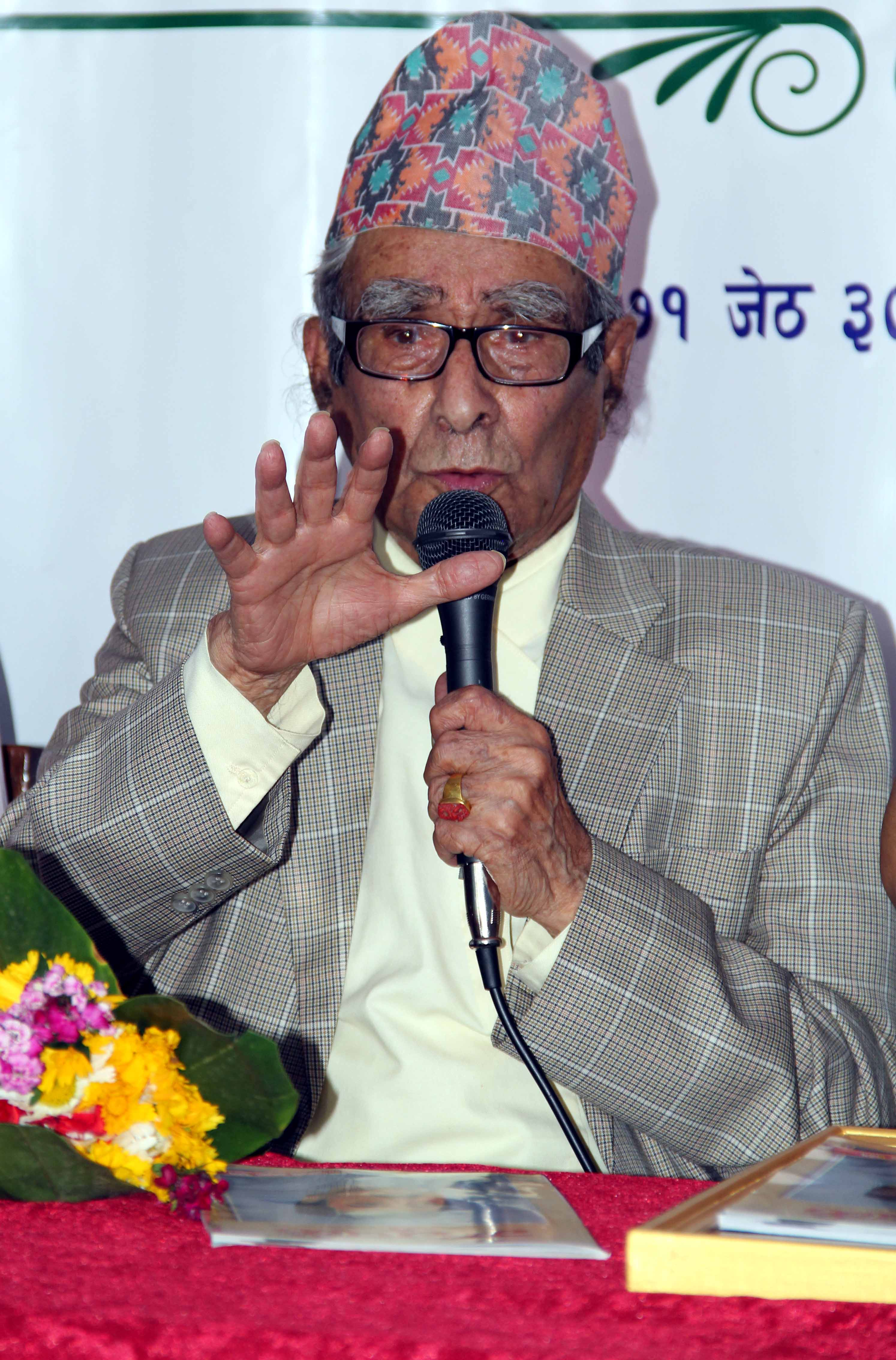
National poet and scholar Madhav Prasad Ghimire in 2014.

His writing career developed in his childhood which was spent in the [Lamjung ], in the hills. His first published work was titled Gyanpuspa, and published in Gorkhapatra, when he was 14. Upon his return from Varanasi (then Banaras), he worked as a writer for Bhashanubad Parishad, and later as a co-editor for Gorkhapatra in 1944. He went on to become the editor of the Gorkhapatra in 1946. He was also a contributor to Sharada and Udaya journals. It is believed that Ghimire was inspired and motivated by the works of the Indian poet Rabindranath Tagore.

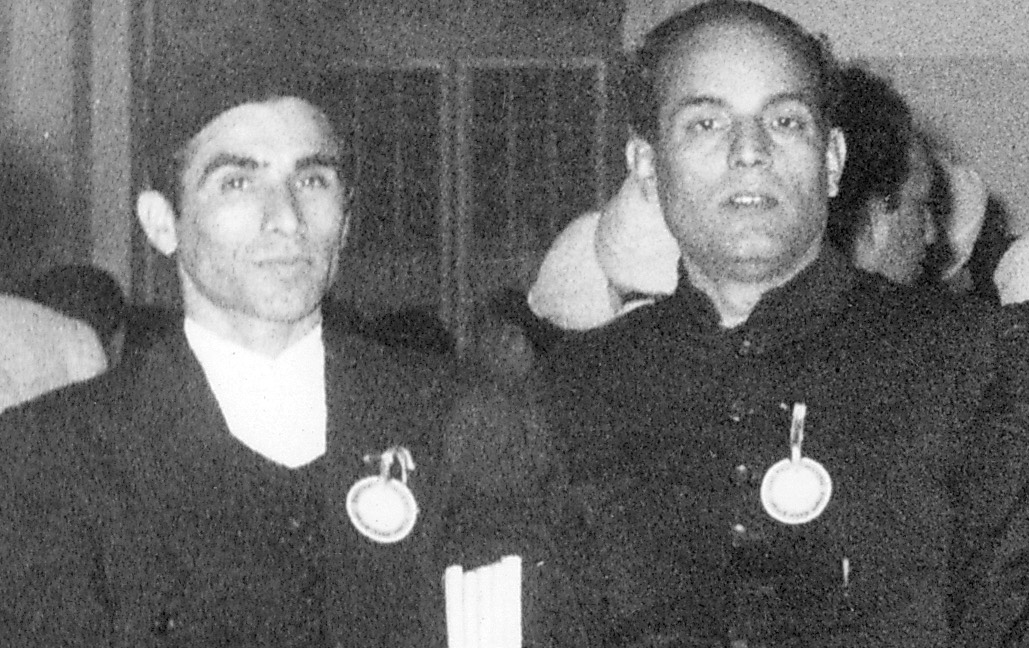
Madhav Prasad Ghimire with Laxmi Prasad Devkota in 1946

In 1951, he returned to his home village and worked as a teacher for a brief period. In 1953, he became a member of Kavya Pratisthan led by Laxmi Prasad Devkota. He wrote one of his popular works, Gauri, in 1947 as a lament on the loss of his wife.

Some of his well known works include Gauri (epic), Malati Mangale, Manjari, Indrakumari, Rastra Nirmata, Kinnar-Kinnari (lyrical anthology), Charu Charcha (essay collection), Aafno Bansuri Aafnai Geet, Himal Pari Himal Wari, Aswathama, Rajheswari and Shakuntala (epic). He also authored popular songs such as "Gauncha Geet Nepali", "Nepali Hami Rahaula Kaha", Baisakh, "Phoolko Thunga Bagera Gayo", and "Aajai Rati Dekhe Sapana".

Ghimire's poetic style was based on chanda poetry, a stylisation that combined rhythm with a fixed metre. He was considered a classicist of the Sanskrit school of thought as well as the romantic school of thought, with themes ranging from patriotism to the beauty of nature. Inspired by his childhood in the hills, the hills and the mountains, particularly the Himalayas play a prominent part in his poems. He was also a contemporary follower of poet Laxmi Prasad Devkota.

Between 1979 and 1988, Ghimire was the Vice Chancellor of the Royal Nepal Academy, and was the Chancellor of the same academy from 1988 to 1990.

He was working on another of his epics, Ritambhara, when he died.

== Later life ==
Ghimire's hundredth birthday was celebrated all over Nepal with various programs on 23 September 2018.

He died on 18 August 2020 at the age of 100, at his residence in Kathmandu, due to respiratory problems. His body was cremated at Pashupati aryaghat with state honors. Ghimire was also an honorary Brigadier General with the Nepali Army.

== Personal life ==
Ghimire had six daughters and two sons from two marriages. His first wife, Gauri (née Pokharel), whom he married around 1933–34, when she was ten years old and he was fourteen, died after fourteen years of marriage in which they had two daughters together. He wrote Gauri, a tragic epic, in her memory; it is considered one of his best and most popular works. He married his second wife, Mahakali, at the age of 29. They had two sons and four daughters together.

== Awards and honours ==
Some of Ghimire's awards and honours include:

- Distinguished Academy Medal
- Shree Prasiddha Praval Gorkha Dakshinabahu
- Bhanubhakta Award
- Tribhuwan Pragya Puraskar
- Padmashree Sadhana Samman Puraskar
- Sajha Award
