= Singha Sartha Aju =

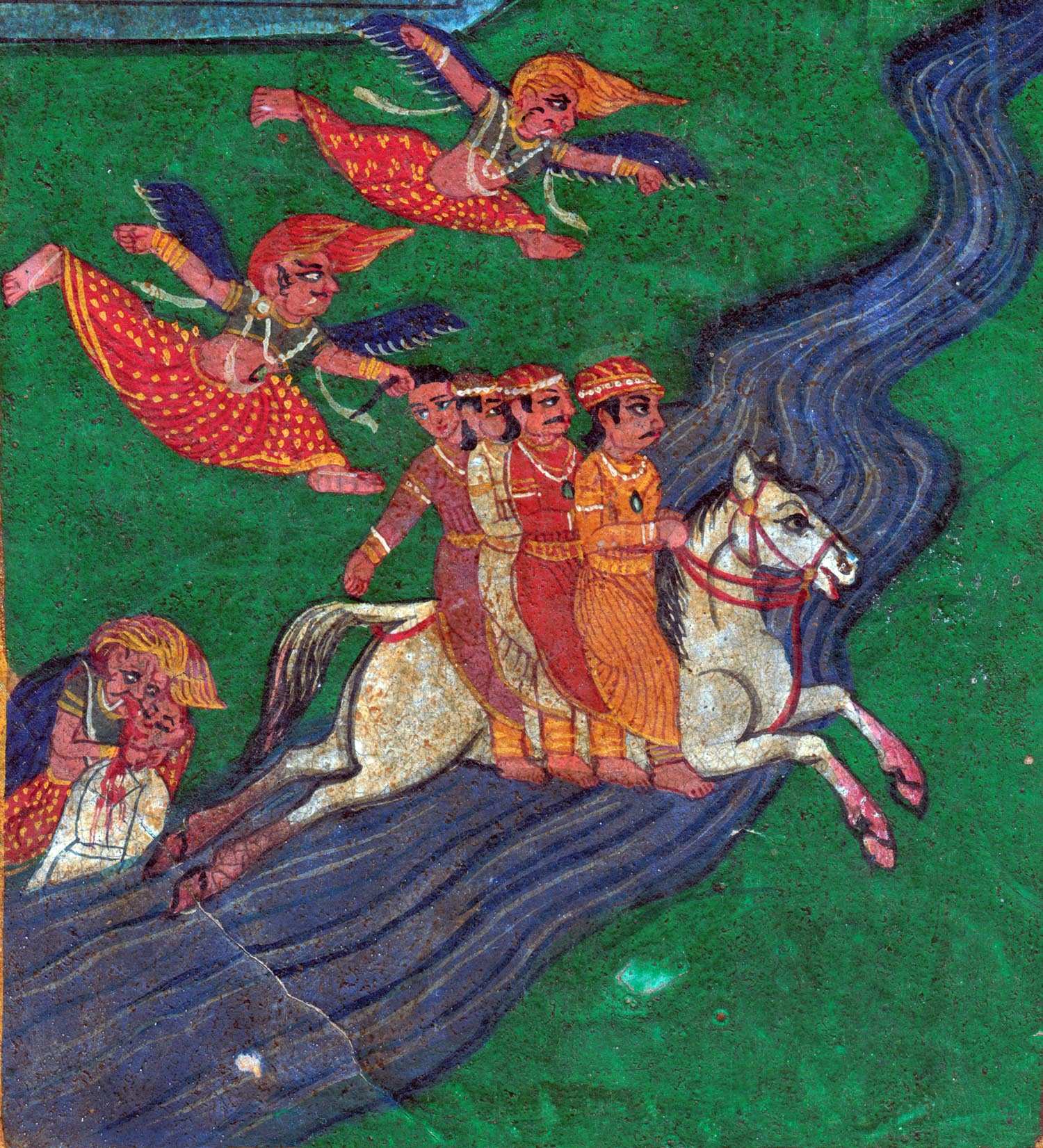
Painting showing Singha Sartha and other merchants escaping on a horse with demonesses in pursuit, from a Nepalese illustrated manuscript.

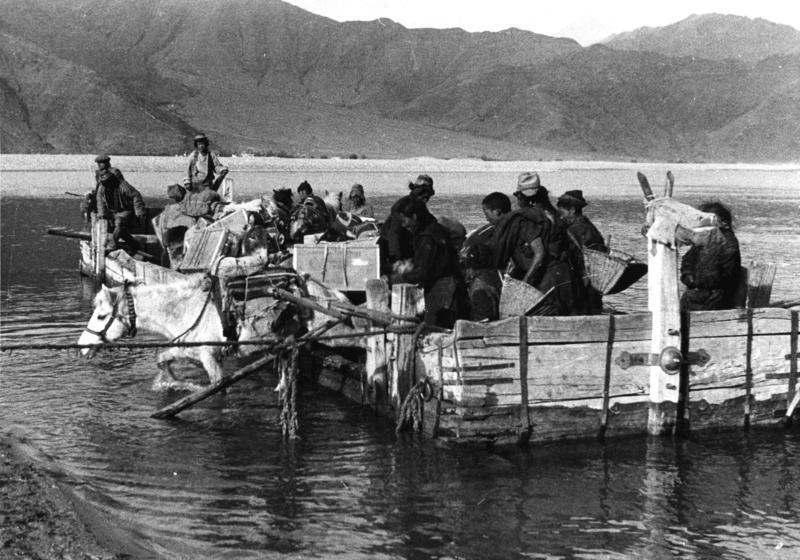
Ferry boat on the Yarlung Tsangpo River with carved horse's head on the prow (right), photo from 1938.

Singha Sārtha Aju (Nepali: सिंहसार्थ आजु) (alternative names Singha Sartha Bahu, Singha Sartha Baha, Simhasartha Bahu) is a merchant in Nepalese folklore. According to tradition, he is the first Newar merchant of Kathmandu to travel to Tibet, and his story is one of the most loved legends in Newar society. Singha Sartha is also considered to be a previous incarnation of the Buddha.

== The legend ==
Singha Sartha led a merchant caravan to Tibet. They arrived at a place where there were many beautiful women, and the traders fell under their spell. Each one of them got a mistress and they spent the days partying, forgetting that they were on a business trip. One night, Karunamaya, the Bodhisattva of Compassion, appeared to Singha Sartha in the flame of an oil lamp, and warned him that their gorgeous lovers were actually demonesses who were waiting for an opportunity to eat them. He told Singha Sartha to check his lover's feet if he was unconvinced, and he would find that the heel pointed to the front and the toes to the back.

Karunamaya then told him that he would help him and his friends to escape. He instructed them to get up before the women and hurry to the river bank where they would find a winged horse. They were to climb on the horse and it would fly them across the river to safety. He also warned them that they should not look back whatever happened, otherwise the demonesses would drag them off the horse and kill them.

Singha Sartha spread the word among his companions, and they all agreed that they had to flee. The next day before dawn, they slipped out of their rooms and reached the river bank. There was a horse as promised, and they all got on its back. The Bodhisattva had taken the form of the horse to help the merchants escape. As the horse took off for the other bank, the women came running after them, pleading not to be left behind. Their sorrowful cries made the men look back, and they were dragged off the horse. Singha Sartha was the only one who maintained his self-control, and he returned to Nepal safely.

== Legacy ==
Ferry boats on the Yarlung Tsangpo River in Tibet are decorated with a wooden horse's head symbolizing the horse Shyam Karna that carried Singha Sartha to safety. A stupa dedicated to Singha Sartha once stood on the Barkhor in Lhasa. The traditional trade fair held in Jampaling, Tibet is associated with Singha Sartha, who is known as Norbu Sangya in Tibetan. There was a shrine dedicated to him near the great stupa of Jampaling which was destroyed during the Cultural Revolution.

In Kathmandu, Singha Sartha has been deified as Chakan Dyah (चकं द्य:), an incarnation of the Buddha, and his statue is carried through the city in a procession on the full moon day of March. Singha Sartha is credited as the founder of the Buddhist courtyard named Thambahil (alternative names Vikramshila Mahavihar, Bhagwan Bahal) situated in Thamel, Kathmandu.

== See also ==
- Lhasa Newar (trans-Himalayan traders)
