= Truck Driver (1994 film) =

1994 Nepali film

- Theatrical release poster
- Nepali: ट्रक ड्राइभर
- Directed by: Rajkumar Sharma
- Screenplay by: Brajesh Khanal
- Story by: Shambhujeet Baskota
- Produced by: Kiran Sharma; Ashok Sharma
- Starring: Shiv Shrestha; Karishma Manandhar; Shree Krishna Shrestha; Madan Krishna Shrestha; Alina; Hari Bansha Acharya; Bhim Bahadur Thapa; Rajaram Poudyal; Basundhara Bhusal; Kiran K.C. Anju Ranjitkar; Vijaya Lama
- Music by: Sambhujeet Baskota
- Release date: 1 April 1994 (Nepal)
- Running time: 138 Minutes
- Country: Nepal
- Language: Nepali
- Budget: ₹25 lakh
- Box office: ₹60 lakh

Truck Driver is a 1994 Romance/Drama Nepalese movie, written by Brajesh Khanal and directed by Rajkumar Sharma. This movie features Shiva Shrestha, Karishma Manandhar, Shree Krishna Shrestha, Madan Krishna Shrestha and Hari Bansha Acharya in the lead roles. This film became one of the highest-grossing films of all time in Nepal. This movie also features the Maha Jodi who were popular comedians at that time. The songs of this film became popular in Nepal. The film was made on a budget of ₹25 lakh, grossed ₹60 lakh, and made ₹25 lakh profit, one of the highest of its time, making it one of the biggest hits in Nepali cinema history.

== Plot ==
A truck driver falls in love with the daughter of a restaurant worker on a highway. As the small hotel runs well because of her youth and beauty, the cruel father does not want his daughter to marry and go away. One of his crooked friends convinces him to get rid of the truck driver. The friend compromises the brake linings of the truck, which falls down several hundred feet on the narrow windy and hilly highway resulting in the driver's death. The girl tries to commit suicide. However, she is saved by a young owner of a fuel station across from the hotel. He has been secretly in love with her over the years. He offers to marry her, giving his name to the child to be born. They move to a big city, Kathmandu, and raise the girl child. The second chapter of their lives after the daughter is born is a complete turnaround with unexpected twists in the plot.

== Cast ==
- Shiva Shrestha
- Karishma Manandhar
- Shree Krishna Shrestha
- Madan Krishna Shrestha
- Hari Bansha Acharya
- Rajaram Poudyal
- Basundhara Bhusal
- Kiran K.C.
- Vijaya Lama
- Amit Giri
- Bhim Bahadur Thapa

== Soundtrack ==
All music is composed by Sambhujeet Baskota.

No.	Title	Singer(s)	Length
1.	"Samjhana Birsana"	Udit Narayan, Deepa Jha, Shambhujeet Baskota	4:58
2.	"Meri Putali"	Udit Narayan, Deepa Jha	5:08
3.	"Ekaichhin Parkha"	Udit Narayan, Tara Sharma	4:38
4.	"Chithi Aayena"	Kavita Krishnamurthy	6:09
5.	"Timi rimjhim"	Udit Narayan, Anupama Desh Pandey	6:20
