= Usha Poudel =

Nepalese actress

- Born: Rukmini Kumari Poudel; 29 August 1977 (age 48); Janakpur, Madhesh Province, Kingdom of Nepal
- Other names: Rukmini Poudel; Muna
- Education: Kanti Ishwori Kanya School (SLC)
- Occupation: Actor
- Years active: 1999 – present
- Spouse: Sudhanshu Joshi (2016–2020)

Usha Poudel (born 29 August 1977) is a Nepalese dancer and movie actress. Usha debuted in Nepali movie industry as an actress in Nepali movie "Karma". Her second movie "Muna Madan" made on a popular book titled Muna Madan, by Laxmi Prasad Devkota in 1999.

Usha Poudel married a Nepali actor Sudhanshu Joshi in a ceremony held in Virginia, USA on 24 November 2016.

Rukmani Kumari Paudel (Usha) is an actress from Nepal with over 40 feature films including Karma, Muna Madan, Godhuli, Timro Maya, Pyari Bahini, Ganga, Jetho Kancho, Ram Laxman, Baaz, Krodh and Maya Nagara, Jwalamukhi. She has done 8 television series, 36 music videos and over a dozen television commercial films, carving a niche for herself as a power house of talent with a huge fan following base in no time. She received a "Best Actress" award in 2003 for her outstanding performance in a television series. One of her films Muna Madan was selected to represent Nepal at the 2004 Oscar. She has traveled across the world as a stage performer where her dancing talent was vastly appreciated. Her talent has been recognized and honoured by the president of Nepal, Dr. Ram Baran Yadav.

Her eagerness to grow and take on challenges strengthened her to take a further plunge. Taking into consideration her unfamiliarity with the Hindi language, she shifted to Mumbai. She spent her initial days learning Hindi and picked it up rapidly. After few auditions, her stint with Bollywood began. She gradually started working in prime time television shows like Tujh Sang Preet Lagai Sajna, Jai Jai Jai Bajrang Bali, Adaalat, Chintu Chinki aur ek badi si love story to name a few. She has been featured in television commercial films and has modeled for several brands.

After reaching Mumbai, the actress didn't appear in Nepal at any formal functions. However, she was recently seen in the USA. She appeared dancing at a function organized among Nepal in San Francisco by different Nepali organizations on the occasion of New Year-2015.

She has kept mum on whether she will return from USA. Representatives of local Nepali organizations have informed that the actress has alreadyspent three months there and is willing to be settled in the USA.
