= Ambalika Devi =

First female novelist of Nepal (1894–1936)

First female novelist of Nepal Ambalika Devi
- अम्बालिकादेवी
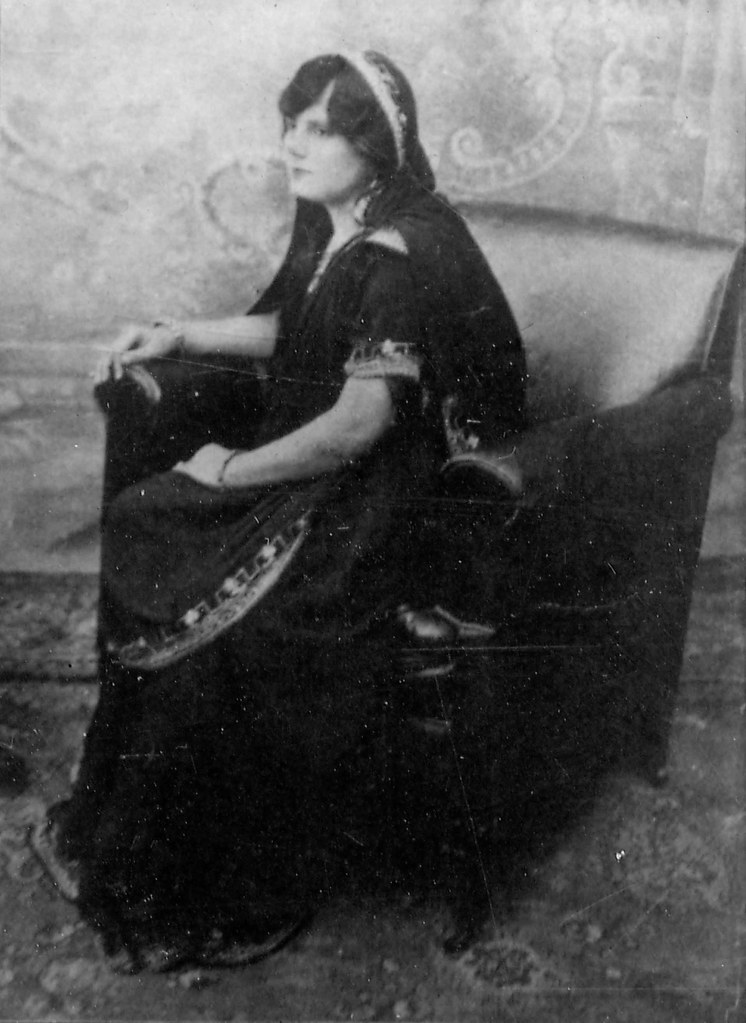
- Formal portrait, c. early 20th century
- Born: 20 May 1894; Kathmandu, Nepal
- Died: 15 December 1936 (aged 42); Patna, British Raj
- Other name: Putali (Butterfly)
- Occupations: Novelist; Poet; Writer
- Notable work: Rajput Ramani
- Spouse: Ambika Prasad Upadhyaya (m. 1901)
- Parents: Ekkrishna Nepal (father); Ratna Kumari (mother)

Ambalika Devi Upadhyaya, (Note: Nepali: अम्बालिकादेवी उपाध्याय) (20 May 1894 – 15 December 1936), affectionately known as Putali (Butterfly), was a Nepalese novelist, poet, and writer. She is regarded as the first female novelist of Nepal and is considered one of the pioneering figures of women's literature in Nepal.

Through her literary works, she contributed to the development of early modern Nepalese literature at a time when women had very limited participation in the literary field.

Her novel Rajput Ramani, published in 1932, is recognized as one of the earliest novels written by a Nepalese woman and remains an important work in the history of Nepalese literature.

== Biography ==
She was born on 20 May 1894 in Makhan Tole, Kathmandu, Nepal to her father Ekkrishna Nepal and her mother Ratna Kumari into a affluent Khas Brahmin family. Her father served as a Subba (officer) under the Rana regime. Her maternal grandmother, Dev Kumari Koirala was the wet nurse of King Prithvi Bir Bikram Shah. During her childhood, Ambalika Devi was affectionately known as Putali (lit. "Butterfly").

At the age of seven, she married to Ambika Prasad Upadhyaya. In accordance with the prevailing custom, her name was changed to Ambalika Devi after marriage. She then moved to her husband's home in Patna. She was educated at home by private tutors and received an English-medium education.

In 1932, she published Rajput Ramani. The book was completed on 1 May 1932 and published in September 1932 by General Trading Company in Varanasi. It is recognized as the first novel in the Nepali language written by a woman.

== Personal life ==
In 1901, at the age of seven, she married the Nepalese historian Ambika Prasad Upadhyaya. The couple had no children and adopted Rajeshwor, the son of Ambika Prasad Upadhyaya's younger brother, Sharada Prasad Upadhyaya as their dharmaputra (spiritual son). The adoption was performed according to Hindu rituals. Ambalika Devi died on 15 December 1936 in Patna, British Raj.

== Works ==
- Rajput Ramani (1932)
