= Ghero =

Nepali folk drama

- Original language: Nepali
- Written by: Kedar Nath Paudel
- Subject: the impact of superstition on Nepali society
- Genre: Drama

Premiere
- Date: 2018
- Directed by: Kapil Sharma

Ghero (Nepali: घेरो) is a Nepali folk drama produced by Indreni Theater that presents the practice of superstition in Nepali society, particularly in Gandaki Pradesh. The play utilizes the Balan style and storytelling from hymns, which are strong aspects of the dialect and love drama of Gandaki Pradesh. It was first staged at Youth Creation Theater in November 2018 and has been performed internationally in various festivals, including the Rara National Drama Festival and Pokhara International Drama Festival. It has been staged in Nepal, India, Egypt, South Korea and Germany.

The play is written by Kedar Nath Paudel and directed by Kapil Sharma.
