= Somnath Sigdel =

Nepalese scholar and author

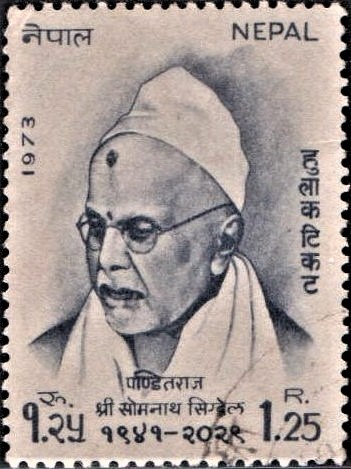
- Nepali stamp featuring Sigdel
- Born: October 5, 1884; Nepal
- Died: 1972 (aged 87–88); Nepal
- Notable work: Madhya Chandrikā (1920); Aadarsha Raghav (1948); Digambar Bibaha

Somnath Sigdel (Nepali: सोमनाथ सिग्देल or Nepali: सोमनाथ सिग्द्याल; 1884–1972; also known as Somnath Sigdyal) was a Nepalese renowned scholar and author.

== Biography ==
Somnath Sigdel was born on 5 October 1884 to Jagannath Sigdel in Nepal. His father was a Pandit of Vyākaraṇa, Dharmaśāstra and Jyotisa. He studied at Ranipokhari Sanskrit Pathashala in Kathmandu and later he moved to Banaras where he got a degree from Queens College Benares. Sigdel also served as principal of Valmiki Sanskrit College in Kathmandu. Later he was made a member of Nepal Academy.

From 1906, he started to published poems in the magazine Sundari from Banaras. In 1920, He published Madhya Chandrikā (lit. Middle grammar). His Aadarsha Raghav (1948) is regarded as the modern Nepali version of Ramayana. Sigdel's poems were written in the style of Motiram Bhatta. His comic Digambar Bibaha is one of the earliest kind published in Nepal.

He was given the title of Pandit Raj (Master Scholar) by King Mahendra. Sigdel died in 1972. In 1973, the Government of Nepal issued postage stamps featuring Sigdel. He was awarded Tribhuvan Pragya Award for his contributions to language, literature, culture, and Order of Gorkha Dakshina Bahu.

== Works ==
- Madhya Chandrikā (1920)
- Aadarsha Raghav (1948)
- Digambar Bibaha
- Suktisindhu
- Shakti Ballabh
- Laghu Chandrika

== Awards ==
- Nepal Academy's Tribhuvan Pragya Award.
- Order of Gorkha Dakshina Bahu
