= Malati Mangale =

Musical drama by Madhav Prasad Ghimire

- Cover page of the book
- Author: Madhav Prasad Ghimire
- Original title: मालती मङ्गले
- Language: Nepali
- Genre: Musical play
- Publisher: Sajha Prakashan
- Publication date: 2039 BS
- Publication place: Nepal
- Media type: Print(Paperback)
- ISBN: 9789993325994

Malati Mangale (Nepali: मालती मङ्गले) is a musical drama written by Madhav Prasad Ghimire in 2039 BS (AD 1982–83). One of author's most popular works, and considered one of the best ballets by Nepali poets, it is based on true events from a village in Gorkha.

== Adaptation ==
It was recorded for the first time as a musical recording in 2044 BS (AD 1987–88). Ghimire brought together music composer Ambar Gurung and singer Narayan Gopal, who were not on speaking terms at the time, to collaborate on the cassette recording of the play. Narayan Gopal could not be convinced to work together with singer Tara Devi; the two recorded their duet with a partition wall between them in the recording studio.

== See also ==
- Gauri
- Ghumne Mechmathi Andho Manche
- Muna Madan
