= Nepali Lok Katha =

Nepalese folk tales collection

- Cover Page of the 2021 Reprint
- Author: Tulasi Diwasa
- Original title: नेपाली लोककथा
- Cover artist: Sachin Yogal Shrestha
- Language: Nepali
- Subject: Nepali folk-tales
- Genre: Folklore
- Publisher: Nepal Rajakiya Pragya Pratisthan, Book Hill Publications
- Publication date: 1974/1975
- Publication place: Nepal
- Media type: Print
- Pages: 600
- ISBN: 9789937935173

Nepali Lok Katha (Nepali: नेपाली लोककथा, lit. 'Nepalese folk tales') is a Nepali-language folk tales collection by Tulasi Diwasa. It was published in 2031 BS (1974 -1975 CE) by Nepali Rajakiya Pragya Pratisthan. It consists of folktales form various regions and languages across Nepal.

The book has been used as a source of folklores in various universities in Nepal.

== Background ==
The book was first published on 2031 BS by Nepal Academy. It was later published with additional stories on February 17, 2021, by Book Hill Publication. The book consists of 122 folktales collected from various regions, languages, castes and cultures of Nepal. The book had taken more than a decade to complete during Panchayat rule in Nepal.

== See also ==
- Karnali Lok Sanskriti
- Nepalese folklore
- Hamro Lok Sanskriti
- Limbuwanko Etihasik Dastavej Sangraha
