= Laxmi Prasad Devkota =

Nepalese poet (1909 – 1960)

Mahakavi Laxmi Prasad Devkota
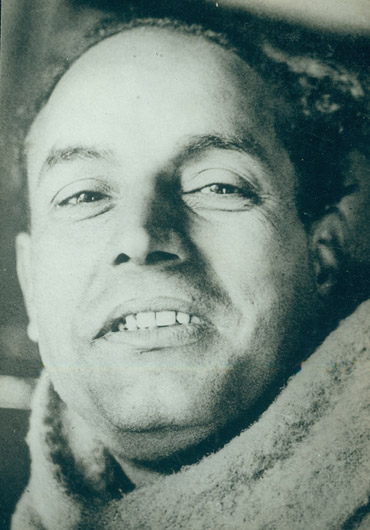
- Portrait of Mahakavi Devkota

Minister of Education and Autonomy of Nepal
- In office 26 July 1957 – 15 May 1958
- Monarch: Mahendra
- Prime Minister: K. I. Singh
- Preceded by: Unknown
- Succeeded by: Unknown

Personal details
- Born: 12 November 1909 Dhobidhara, Kathmandu
- Died: 14 September 1959 (aged 49) Aryaghat, Kathmandu
- Spouse: Man Devi Chalise
- Children: 4 sons; 5 daughters
- Parent(s): Til Madhav Devkota (father); Amar Rajya Lakshmi (mother)
- Relatives: Lok Priya Devi (sister)
- Education: Durbar High School (school level); Tri-Chandra College (BA) & (LLB)
- Profession: Poet; Politician; Playwright; Scholar; Lawyer; Lecturer; Novelist

Laxmi Prasad Devkota (Note: Nepali: लक्ष्मीप्रसाद देवकोटा) (12 November 1909 – 14 September 1959), was a Nepalese poet, novelist, playwright, scholar, lawyer, lecturer, and politician. Honored with the title of Mahakavi in Nepalese literature. (Note: Nepali: महाकवि; Mahakavi is translated as English: Great poet) He is regarded as one of the greatest literary figures in Nepal, and often described as a poet with a golden heart. Devkota is best known for works such as Muna Madan, Sulochana, Kunjini, Bhikhari, and Shakuntala.

== Early life and education ==
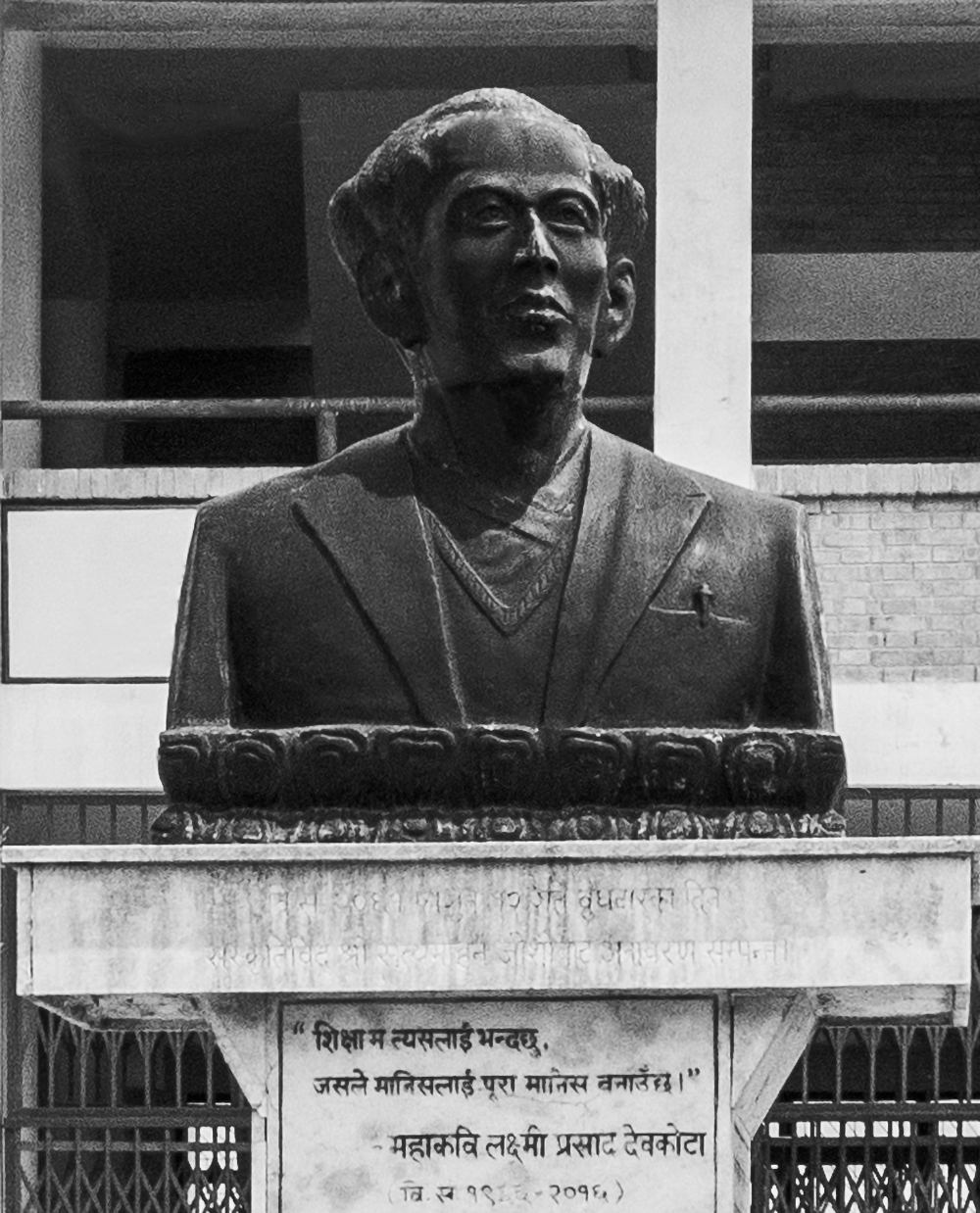
Statue of Devkota in Tribhuvan University.

Laxmi Prasad Devkota was born on the night of Lakshmi Puja on 12 November 1909 (27 Kartik 1966 BS) to Til Madhav Devkota and Amar Rajya Lakshmi Devi in Dhobidhara, Kathmandu. His father was a Sanskrit scholar, who taught him in his childhood. He started his formal education at Durbar High college, where he studied both Sanskrit grammar and English. After finishing his matriculation exams from Patna at the age of 17, he pursued a Bachelor of Arts along with a Bachelor of Laws at Tri-Chandra College and graduated from Patna University as a private examinee. His desire to complete his master's degree was left incomplete due to his family's financial conditions.

A decade after his graduation as a lawyer, he started working in the Nepal Bhasaanuwad Parishad (Publication Censor Board), where he met famous playwright Balkrishna Sama. At the same time, he also worked as a lecturer at Tri-Chandra College and Padma Kanya College.

== Literary career ==
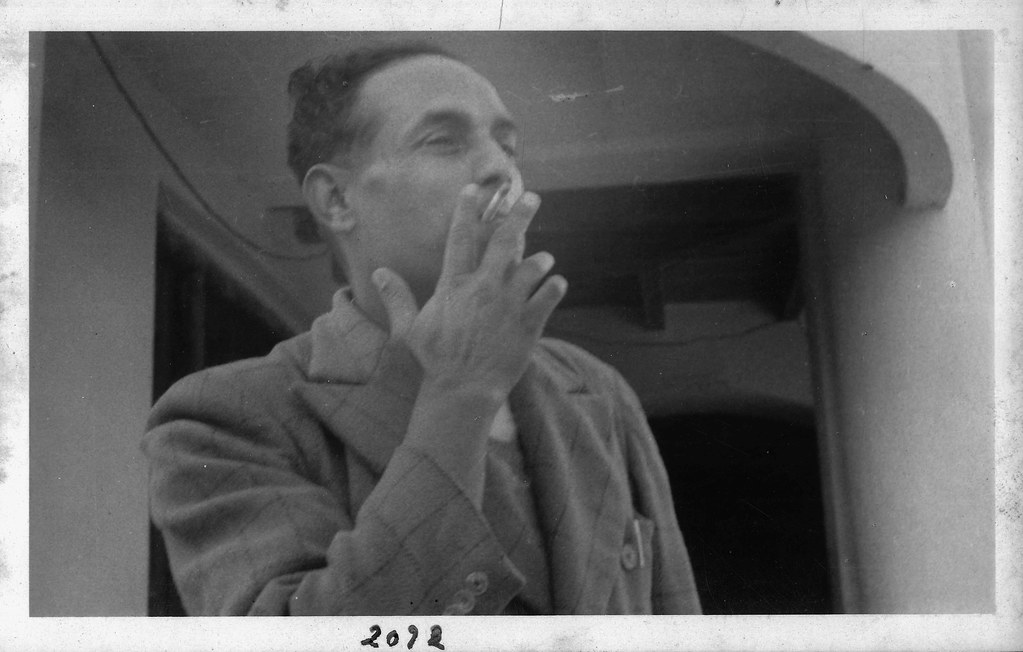
A photo of Devkota smoking, 2013 BS (1956–1957)

Devkota contributed to Nepali literature by starting a modern Nepali language romantic movement in the country. He was the second writer born in Nepal to begin writing epic poems in Nepali literature. Nepali poetry soared to new heights with Devkota's innovative use of the language.

Departing from the Sanskrit tradition that dominated the Nepali literary scene at the time, and being inspired by the Newar language ballad song Ji Waya La Lachhi Maduni, he wrote Muna Madan (Nepali: मुनामदन) (1930), a long narrative poem in a popular Jhyaure bhaka (Nepali: झ्याउरे भाका) folk tune. Muna Madan is undoubtedly the best-selling book in the history of Nepali literature. The 2003 film Muna Madan, which was Nepal's official entry for the Best Foreign Language Film at the 76th Academy Awards, was based on this poem. The work received immediate recognition from the Ranas—the country's ministers at the time. Muna Madan tells the story of Madan, a traveling merchant, who departs for Tibet in a bid to earn some money leaving behind his wife, Muna. The poem describes the thematic hardships of the journey: the grief of separation, the itching of longing, and the torment of death.

The ballad Ji Waya La Lachhi Maduni is a tragic song based on a Newa merchant, his mother, and his wife. The merchant is about to leave Kathmandu for Tibet on a work. The song starts with the wife pleading with her mother-in-law to stop him, saying that it's not even been a month since she came to their home and he wants to go away. Being raised in Kathmandu, Devkota had heard this song from locals singing it at a local Pati (Nepali: पाटी or फ़ल्चा). He was highly fascinated by the song and decided to re-write it in Nepali. Since the Rana rulers had put a ban on the Newa trade, language and literature, he changed the main character from a Newa merchant as in the original song to a Kshatriya (warrior class) character. Although Kshatriya people did not practice trade for their living during those days, he had to depict it as such in order to lure the Rana rulers.

The following couplet, which is among the most famous and frequently quoted lines from the epic, celebrates the triumph of humanity and compassion over the hierarchies created by caste in Nepalese culture.

"क्षेत्रीको छोरो यो पाउ छुन्छ, घिनले छुँदैन
मानिस ठूलो दिलले हुन्छ जातले हुँदैन !"

The son of a Kshatriya touches your feet not with hatred but with love.
A man's greatness is determined by his heart; not by his caste or lineage.

Considered his magnum opus, Muna Madan has remained widely popular among the lay readers of Nepali literature; it remains the most popular Nepali book since 1936; the book was also translated into Mandarin; it was well received by China and considered successful.

Devkota, inspired by his five-month stay in a mental asylum in 1939, wrote a free-verse poem, Pagal (Nepali: पागल, lit. 'The Lunatic'). The poem deals with his usual mental ability and is considered one of the best Nepali language poems.

"जरुर साथी म पागल !
यस्तै छ मेरो हाल ।
म शब्दलाई देख्दछु !
दृश्यलाई सुन्दछु !
बासनालाई स्वाद लिन्छु ।
आकाशभन्दा पातालका कुरालाई छुन्छु ।
ती कुरा,
जसको अस्तित्व लोक मान्दैंन
जसको आकार संसार जान्दैन !"

Surely, my friend, I am mad,
That’s exactly what I am!
I see a word,
Hear sights,
Taste smells,
I touch things thinner than air,
Those things,
Whose existence the world denies,
Whose shapes the world does not know.

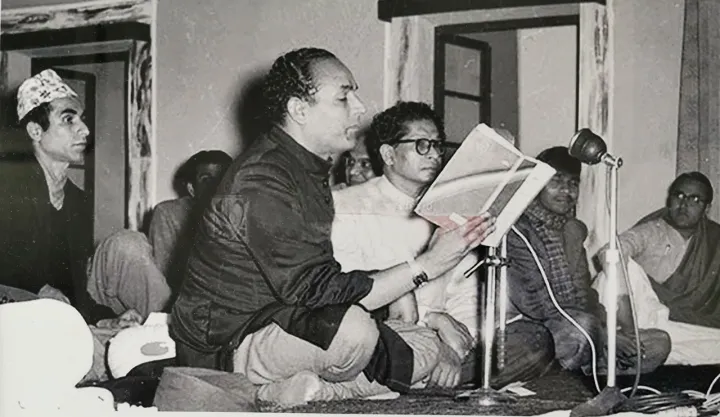
Mahakavi Devkota with poet Madhav Prasad Ghimire and poet Harivansh Rai Bachchan

Devkota had the ability to compose long epics and poems with literary complexity and philosophical density in very short periods of time. He wrote Shakuntala, his first epic poem, and also the first Mahakavya (Nepali: महाकाव्य) written in the Nepali language, in a mere three months. Published in 1945, Shakuntala is a voluminous work in 24 cantos based on Kālidāsa's famous Sanskrit play Abhijñānaśākuntalam. Shakuntala demonstrates Devkota's mastery of Sanskrit meter and diction, which he incorporated heavily while working primarily in Nepali. According to the late scholar and translator of Devkota, David Rubin, Shakuntala is among his greatest accomplishments. "It is, without doubt, a remarkable work, a masterpiece of a particular kind, harmonizing various elements of a classical tradition with a modern point of view, a pastoral with a cosmic allegory, Kālidāsa's romantic comedy of earthly love with a symbolic structure that points to redemption through the coinciding of sensual and sacred love."

Devkota also published several collections of short lyric poems set in various traditional and non-traditional forms and meters. Most of his poetry shows the influence of English Romantic poets like Wordsworth and Coleridge. The title poem in the collection Bhikhari (Nepali: भिखारी, lit. 'Beggar') is reminiscent of Wordsworth's "The Old Cumberland Beggar". In this poem, Devkota describes the beggar going about his ways in dire poverty and desolation, deprived of human love and material comforts. On the other hand, the beggar is also seen as the source of compassion placed at the core of suffering and destitution. Devkota connects the beggar with the divine as the ultimate fount of kindness and empathy:

"कालो बादलबाट खसेको
अन्धकारमा भित्र पसेको,
ईश्वर हो कि भिखारी ?
बोल्दछ ईश्वर हृदय घुसेका
घर, घर आँगन चारी
बोल्दछ, आर्तध्वनिमा बोल्दछ
करूणामृत दिल भारी ।"

Fallen from the blackest clouds
To enter into darker shrouds,
Is he deity or beggar?
Buddha speaks – his words pierce the heart,
Wandering from house to house, yard to yard,
Now speaking with a voice of pain:
His heart in sorrow cowed.

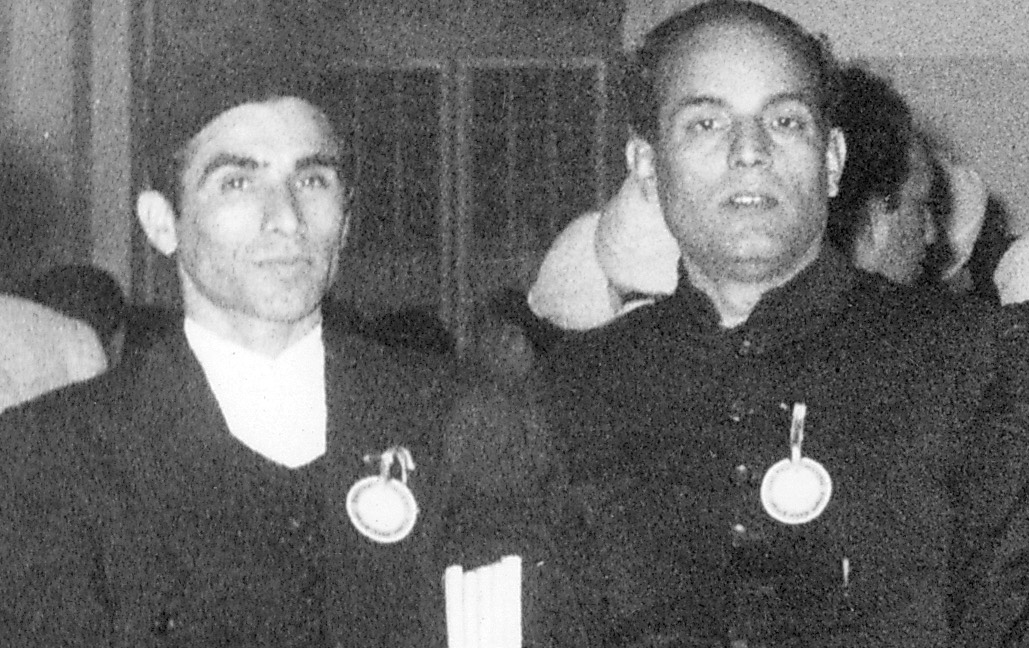
Mahakavi Devkota (right) with poet Madhav Prasad Ghimire (left)

Many of his poems focus on mundane elements of the human and the natural world. The titles of his poems like Ban (Nepali: वन, lit. 'The Woods'), Kisaan (Nepali: किसान, lit. 'The Peasant'), Baadal (Nepali: बादल, lit. 'Clouds') shows that he sought his poetic inspiration in the commonplace and proximal aspects of the world. What resonates throughout most of his poetry is his profound faith in humanity. For instance, in the poem Ban, the speaker goes through a series of interrogations, rejecting all forms of comfort and solace that could be offered solely to him as an individual. Instead, he embraces his responsibility and concern for his fellow beings. The poem ends with the following quatrain that highlights the speaker's humanistic inclinations:

"दोस्त कहाँ छन्? साथ छ को को? घर हो तिम्रो कुन देश?
जान्छौ कुन पुर भवन मुसाफिर, ल्यायौ कुन सन्देश?
दोस्त मेरो शुभ उद्योगी, साथ छ साहस बेश ।
विश्व सबै घर, हृदय-पुरीतिर ल्याउछु सेवा सन्देश ।।"

Where are your friends? Who goes with you? Which land is your home?
What place do you seek, Traveller? With what news do you roam?
My friend is decent diligence. Courage comes with me.
The whole world is my home. To heartland I roam, with hues of humanity.

Besides poetry, Devkota also made significant contributions to the essay genre. He is considered the father of modern Nepali essay writing. He defied the conventional form of essays and broke the traditional rules of essay writing and embraced a more fluid and colloquial style which had more clarity in meaning, expressive in feelings, and eloquent in terms of language. His essays are generally satirical in tone and are characterized by their trenchant humour and ruthless criticism of the modernizing influences from the West on Nepali society. An essay titled Bhaladmi (Nepali: भलादमी, lit. 'Gentleman') or criticizes a decadent trend in Nepali society to respect people based on their outward appearances and outfit rather than their actual inner worth and personality. In another essay titled Ke Nepal Sano Cha? (Nepali: के नेपाल सानो छ?, lit. 'Is Nepal is small'), he expresses deeply nationalistic sentiments inveighing against the colonial forces from British India which, he felt, were encroaching all aspects of Nepali culture. His essays are published in an essays book entitled Laxmi Nibhandha Sanghraha (Nepali: लक्ष्मी निबन्धसङ्‌ग्रह).

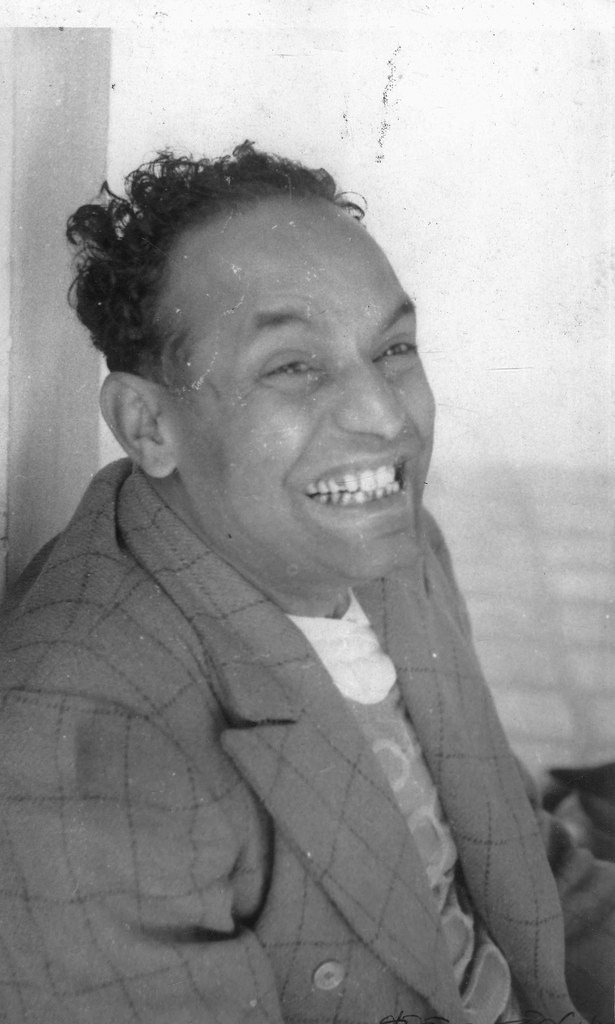
Laxmi Prasad Devkota in 1959

Devkota also translated William Shakespeare's play Hamlet into Nepali. Moreover, he translated his own epic, Shakuntala, into English and wrote several poetry, essays, plays, and epics in English.

== Politics ==
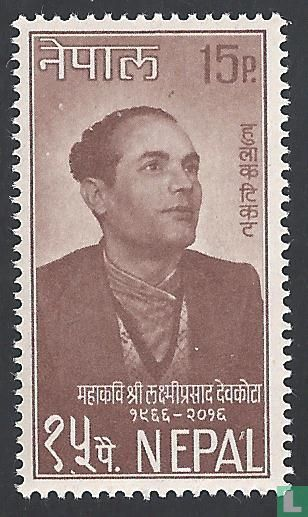
Commemorative stamp of Devkota (1965)

Laxmi Prasad Devkota was not active within any well-established political party, but his poetry consistently embodied an attitude of rebellion against the oppressive Rana dynasty. During his self-exile in Varanasi, he started working as an editor of Yugvani newspaper of the Nepali Congress, leading to the confiscation of all his property in Nepal by the Rana Government. After the introduction of democracy through Revolution of 1951, Devkota was appointed member of the Nepal Salahkar Samiti (Nepali: नेपाल सल्लाहकार समिति, lit. 'Nepal Advisory Committee') in 1952 by King Tribhuvan. Later in 1957, he was appointed as Minister of Education and Autonomous Governance under the premiership of Kunwar Inderjit Singh.

== Personal life ==
Devkota's son, Padma Devkota, is also a poet and writer and served for many years as a professor at the English Department, Tribhuvan University, Kathmandu.

=== Health ===
In the late 1930s, Devkota suffered from nervous breakdowns, probably due to the deaths of his parents and his two-month old daughter. Eventually, in 1939, he was admitted to the Mental Asylum of Ranchi, India, for five months. With financial debts later in his life and being unable to finance the weddings and dowries of his daughters. He is once reported to have said to his wife, "Tonight let's abandon the children to the care of society and youth and renounce this world at bedtime and take potassium cyanide or morphine or something like that [sic]."

== Later years and death ==
Devkota developed cancer and died on 14 September 1959, at Pashupati Aryaghat, along the banks of Bagmati river in Pashupatinath Temple, Kathmandu. He had smoked for most of his life. Prior to his death, Devkota's income was terminated by the Nepal Academy of Literature and Art because he attended the Afro-Asian Writers' Conference, which was held in modern-day Tashkent, without first seeking permission from them. He also spoke at the ceremony, praising well-known figures for their contributions to Nepali literature, including Bhanubhakta Acharya, Lekhnath Paudyal, Pandit Hemraj, and Somnath Sigdel. Devkota claimed in an interview that he hadn't received pay for the previous eight months and that as a result, he had been unable to purchase the medication he needed to treat his disease; moreover, he was struggling to even buy food. Devkota's personality was vibrant and assertive despite the fact that he was battling cancer, but his room was disorganized.

== After death ==
Devkota's personal home was severely affected by the 2015 Nepal Earthquake and was maintained for a few years by his fifth daughter. Later, the Nepal Academy abolished the old structure and built a new museum in 2079 BS to honor the great poet Devkota, named the Mahakabi Laxmi Prasad Devkota Museum, located in Maitidevi, Kathmandu.

== Publications ==
=== Epics ===
Epics of Laxmi Prasad Devkota
Title	Year of first publication	First edition publisher (Kathmandu, unless otherwise stated)	Notes	Ref.
Shakuntala	1945	Sajha	Epic	
Sulochana	2002		Epic	
Bana Kusum			Epic	
Maharana Pratap			Epic	
Prithviraj Chauhan	1992-1993		Epic	
Prometheus			Epic	

=== Poetry / short novels / essays / novel ===
Poetry / Short Novels / Essays of Laxmi Prasad Devkota
Title	Year of first publication	First edition publisher (Kathmandu, unless otherwise stated)	Notes	Ref.
Like Strength (बल जस्तो)				
The Beggar - Poetry Collection (भिखारी - कवितासंग्रह)				
Gaine's Song (गाइने गीत)			Poetry	
Butterfly - Children's Poetry Collection (पुतली - बालकवितासंग्रह )			Poetry	
Golden Morning - Children's Poem (सुनको बिहान - बालकविता)			Poetry	
Pagal (पागल)			poetry	
Farmer - Musical Play (कृषिवाला - गीतिनाटक)			Verse Drama	
Meeting of Dushyant and Shakantula (दुष्यन्त-शकुन्तला भेट)			Short Epic	
Muna Madan (मुनामदन)			Short Epic	
Duel between Raavan and Jatayu (रावण-जटायु युद्ध)			Short Epic	
Kunjini (कुञ्जिनी)			Short Epic	
Luni (लुनी)			Short Epic	
Prince Prabhakar (राजकुमार प्रभाकर)			Short Epic	
Kidnapping of Sita (सीताहरण)			Short Epic	
Mahendu (म्हेन्दु)			Short Epic	
Dhumraketu			Short Epic	
Laxmi Essay Collection (लक्ष्मी निबन्धसङ्‌ग्रह)			Essay	
Champa (चम्पा)			Novel	
The Sleeping Porter (सोता हुआ कुली)			Poetry	
The Witch Doctor and Other Essays	2017	Sangri~La Books	Essays (English)	

== See also ==
- Nepali literature
- Bhanubhakta Acharya
- Mahakavi Devkota

== Bibliography ==
- Shrestha, Chandra Bahadur (1981). My Reminiscence of the Great Poet, Laxmi Prasad Devkota. Royal Nepal Academy. Archived from the original on 5 April 2023.
- Hutt, Michael James (1991). "Lakshmiprasad Devkota (1909-1959)". Himalayan voices : an introduction to modern Nepali literature. Berkeley: University of California Press. ISBN 978-0-520-91026-3. OCLC 43476642. Archived from the original on 21 November 2021.
- Devkota, Laxmi Prasad (1980). Nepali visions, Nepali dreams : the poetry of Laxmiprasad Devkota. Translated by David Rubin. New York: Columbia University Press. ISBN 0-231-05014-3. OCLC 5946334.
- Trivedi, Poonam; Chakravarti, Paromita; Motohashi, Ted (2021). Asian interventions in global Shakespeare : 'all the world's his stage'. New York, NY: Routledge. ISBN 978-1-000-21431-4. OCLC 1196839110.
- Pandey, Nityaraj (1959). महाकवि देवकोटा (in Nepali). Nepal: Sajha Prakashan. ISBN 9789993327929. OCLC 79647044.
- Chauhan, Janga B. (2009). "Bodhi: An Interdisciplinary Journal". Devkota in Russia. 3. Kathmandu, Nepal: Kathmandu University. ISSN 2091-0479. OCLC 644273013. Archived from the original on 3 June 2018.
