= Shakuntala (epic) =

Epic by Lakshmi Prasad Devkota

- शाकुन्तल (महाकाव्य)
- Author: Laxmi Prasad Devkota
- Original title: शाकुन्तल
- Cover artist: Tekbir Mukhiya
- Language: Nepali
- Subject: Romance
- Genre: Epic poetry
- Publisher: Sajha Publications
- Publication date: 1945
- Publication place: Nepal
- ISBN: 9-7899-373-2213-3

Shakuntala (Nepali: शाकुन्तला) is a 1945 Nepali epic poem written by Laxmi Prasad Devkota and published by Sajha Publications. It is considered to be one of the greatest works of Laxmi Prasad Devkota and Nepali literature.

== Introduction ==
The epic is based on the classical play Shakuntala by ancient Sanskrit poet Kālidāsa and is considered the first original epic in the Nepali language. Although it is based on an ancient work, the work has sufficient originality to be considered as such, specially compared to the first Nepali epic Bhanubhakta Ramayana which was a translation of Valmiki Ramayana. It was published in 1945. Devkota took just three months to complete the entire epic.

== Translation ==
Laxmi Prasad Devkota translated the epic into English himself. It was published posthumously in 1991.

== Adaptations ==
Shakuntala has been adapted into a play and performed by the students of Bidya Shankar School under the guidance of Sunil Pokharel, the director of Aroha Gurukul.

== Bibliography ==
- "Shakuntala." A Survey of Nepali Literature in English. (M. Phil. Course Packet. Unit 1: Poetry). Kathmandu: IACER, 2006. 45-57.
