= Muna Madan =

Episodic love poem by Laxmi Prasad Devkota (1936)

- Author: Laxmi Prasad Devkota
- Original title: मुनामदन
- Language: Nepali
- Subject: Narrative poetry
- Genre: Romance
- Publication place: Nepal
- Pages: 41
- OCLC: 712775523

Muna Madan (Nepali: मुनामदन) is a 1936 Nepali-language episodic love poem written by Laxmi Prasad Devkota. It is about Madan, newly married to Muna, who leaves for Lhasa in Tibet to make his fortune, despite protests from his wife.

== Synopsis ==
Muna Madan follows the life of Madan, a Chhetri man from Kathmandu who leaves Muna, his wife, to go to Lhasa to earn a fortune. He is cautioned against leaving by both Muna and his elderly mother, but he decides to leave anyway. While he initially intends to spend just a few weeks in Lhasa, he spends a longer time there to earn more fortune, but he can't tolerate the cold. After talking with his friends, he finally starts to set off for Kathmandu but falls sick with jaundice on the way. His travelling companion, Ram, returns to Kathmandu and tells Muna that her husband has died.

But Madan is rescued by a 'Bhote', a Tibetan man. Tibet is called 'Bhot' in the Nepali language, drawn from the classical Tibetan name for Tibet, Bod. The Tibetan nurses Madan back to health, leading Madan to realize that men are great not because of their castes nor race but because of their hearts and humanity. In the Nepali Hindu caste system, a Tibetan, as a meat-eating Buddhist, would have been considered 'untouchable' by devout Hindus. The couplet uttered by Madan while touching the Tibetan's feet, a sign of great respect in Khas Nepali culture, has since taken on the status of modern proverbs, often uttered by Nepalis in their daily speech:

In Nepali

क्षेत्रीको छोरो यो पाउ छुन्छ, घिनले छुँदैन;
मानिस ठूलो दिलले हुन्छ जातले हुँदैन

Translation (by Michael Hutt)

Son of a Chhetri touches your feet, but not with contempt,
a person is great by his heart, not by his name nor his caste.

When Madan finally returns to Kathmandu, he discovers that his elderly mother has died of old age while Muna has died of a broken heart. Madan comes to conclusion that riches have little value when you have no one to share them with. He vows to follow them into death and subsequently passes away at the end of the poem.

== Inspiration ==
Devkota's Muna Madan is believed to be based on an 18th-century Nepal Bhasa ballad called 'Ji Waya La Lachhi Maduni' ('It has not been a month since I came'). The song, which is popular in Newar society, tells the story of a merchant from Kathmandu who leaves for Tibet on business, leaving behind his newly wed bride. The wife is concerned for his safety as the journey to Tibet is filled with hardships, and she pleads with him not to go. But he leaves despite her protests. When he returns home after many years, he finds that she has died.

== Writing ==
Before Muna Madan, Devkota had primarily been influenced by the English Romantics, but with this poem, he took a quintessentially Nepali folk tradition as his inspiration, the jhyaure meter. Devkota was reportedly inspired to write a poem in jhyaure by the singing of women plating rice in the fields during the Nepali month of Asar. He chose to write in Asare Jhyaure, the poetic meter of central Nepali rice-planting songs. His choice of the jhyaure meter was controversial, as the folk meter was associated among Kathmandu's literary elite with flirtation and the erotic. Stirr argues that the poem "created a link between his elite world and the worlds of ordinary Nepali people of various castes and ethnic groups, bringing hallmarks of folk song and vernacular erotic poetry into a refined atmosphere where meticulous Sanskrit aesthetics and Brahminical Hindu morality were the norms."

Devkota also moved away from the baroque style of the Romantics and wrote Muna Madan in much simpler Nepali, an attempt to create something that was purely Nepali in character. Devkota also used the epic form to comment on various socio-political issues, namely the pursuit of wealth at the cost of family and the Hindu caste system. Another of the poem's couplets that has entered common usage occurs when Muna is entreating Madan not to go to Lhasa for the sake of riches:

In Nepali

हातका मैला सुनका थैला के गर्नु धनले
साग र सिस्नु खाएको बेस आनन्दी मनले

Translation (by Michael Hutt)

Purses of gold are like the dirt on your hands, what can be done with wealth?
Better to eat only nettles and greens with happiness in your heart.

Although Devkota would go on to produce epic works of immense literary significance, like Shakuntala, Sulochana, and Maharana Pratap, Muna Madan was reportedly his most beloved poem. While on his deathbed in 1959, he is believed to have said that "even though all of his works might perish after his demise, Muna and Madan should be saved".

Muna Madan remains one of the most commercially successful Nepali books ever published.

== Characters ==
- Madan – A Chhetri man from Kathmandu who goes to Lhasa to earn money.
- Muna – Madan's newly married wife.
- Aama – Madan's mother.
- Bhote - who saves Madan's life.(tibetian)
- Ram – Madan's companion.
- Sister - who goes to in - law home.
- Chyangba - who saved Madan when he was sick in the middle of nowhere.
- Bada kaji - who gives debt to other villagers.
- Kaji - who loves Muna.
- Naini Bhauju - Supports Muna throughout the difficulty of losing her husband

== Themes ==
At the heart of the poem is the relationship between Madan and Muna, hence the title of the play. While ostensibly a love poem, much of the narrative follows Madan on his journey to Lhasa and back. The overall theme of the poem is that the pursuit of material wealth can have serious consequences and that riches are of no use when there is no one to share them with. Devkota also makes a bold statement against the prevailing caste system, by having his devout Chhetri protagonist touch the feet of the 'untouchable' Tibetan man.

The poem presents a distinct contrast between the masculine Madan who goes off on a trip (to Lhasa) to provide for his family and the feminine Muna who is "a paragon of high-caste Hindu female virtue, enclosed in the home and waiting for her husband".

== Influence ==
Muna Madan is among Devkota's most popular and most accessible works. It is regularly studied in schools as an introduction to modern Nepali poetry and remains a best-seller for its publisher, Sajha Prakashan. Its impact on Nepali language and culture is perhaps second to none, with many rhyming couplets entering the Nepali vernacular as proverbs.

Hutt has also argued that Muna Madan established the jhyāure meter as one of the “native” meters of Nepal.

== Adaptations ==
The poem has been adapted into a movie of the same name. The film was directed by Gyanendra Deuja, starring Aviyana Dhakal and Usha Poudel in the role of Muna. Muna Madan was Nepal's official submission for the 2004 Academy Awards.

== See also ==
- Heer Ranjha
- Romeo and Juliet
