= Kathmandu =

Capital and largest city in Nepal

Kathmandu: काठमाडौँ (Nepali); 𑐫𑐾𑑃 (Newar)
- Capital and metropolitan city
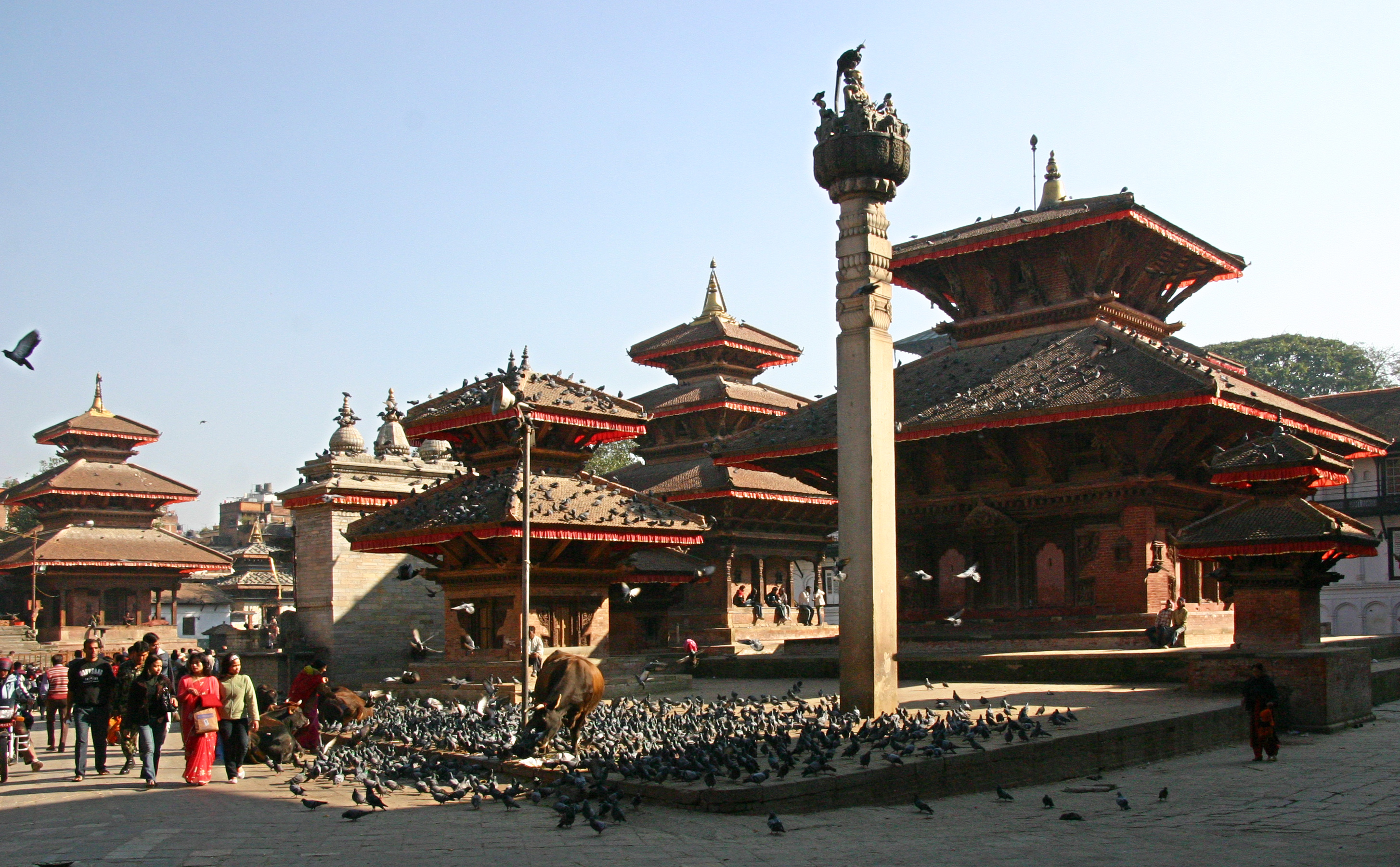
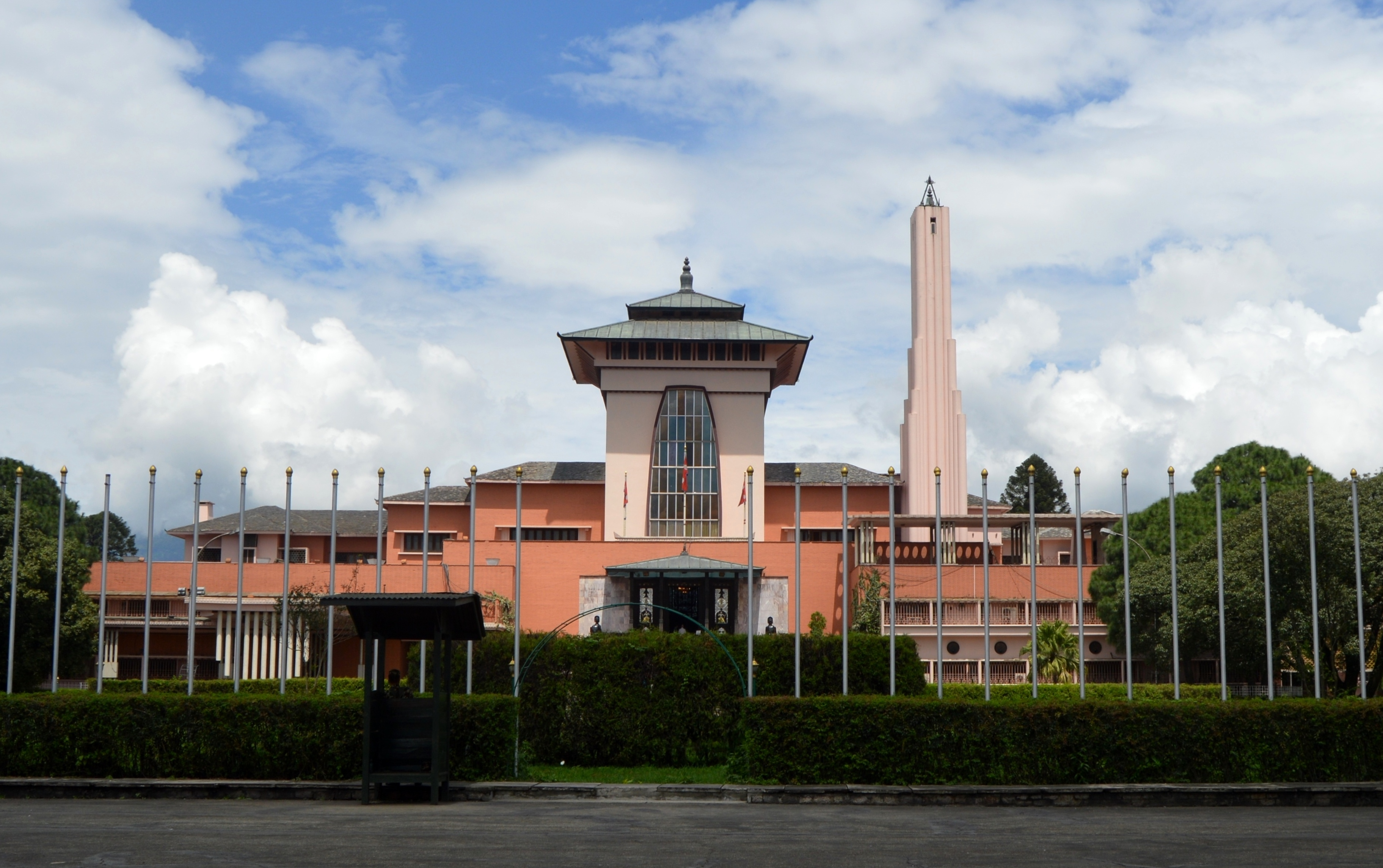
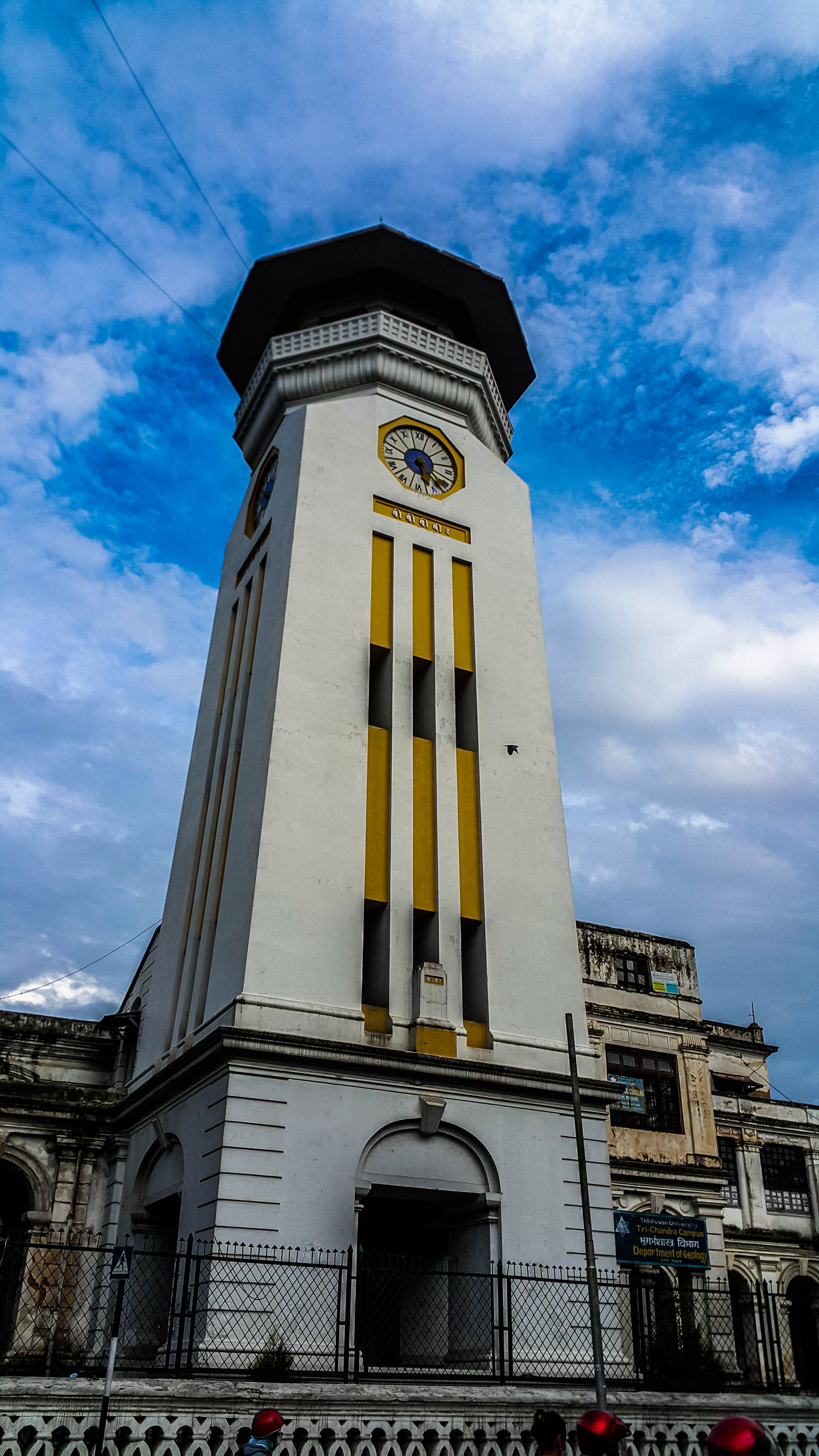
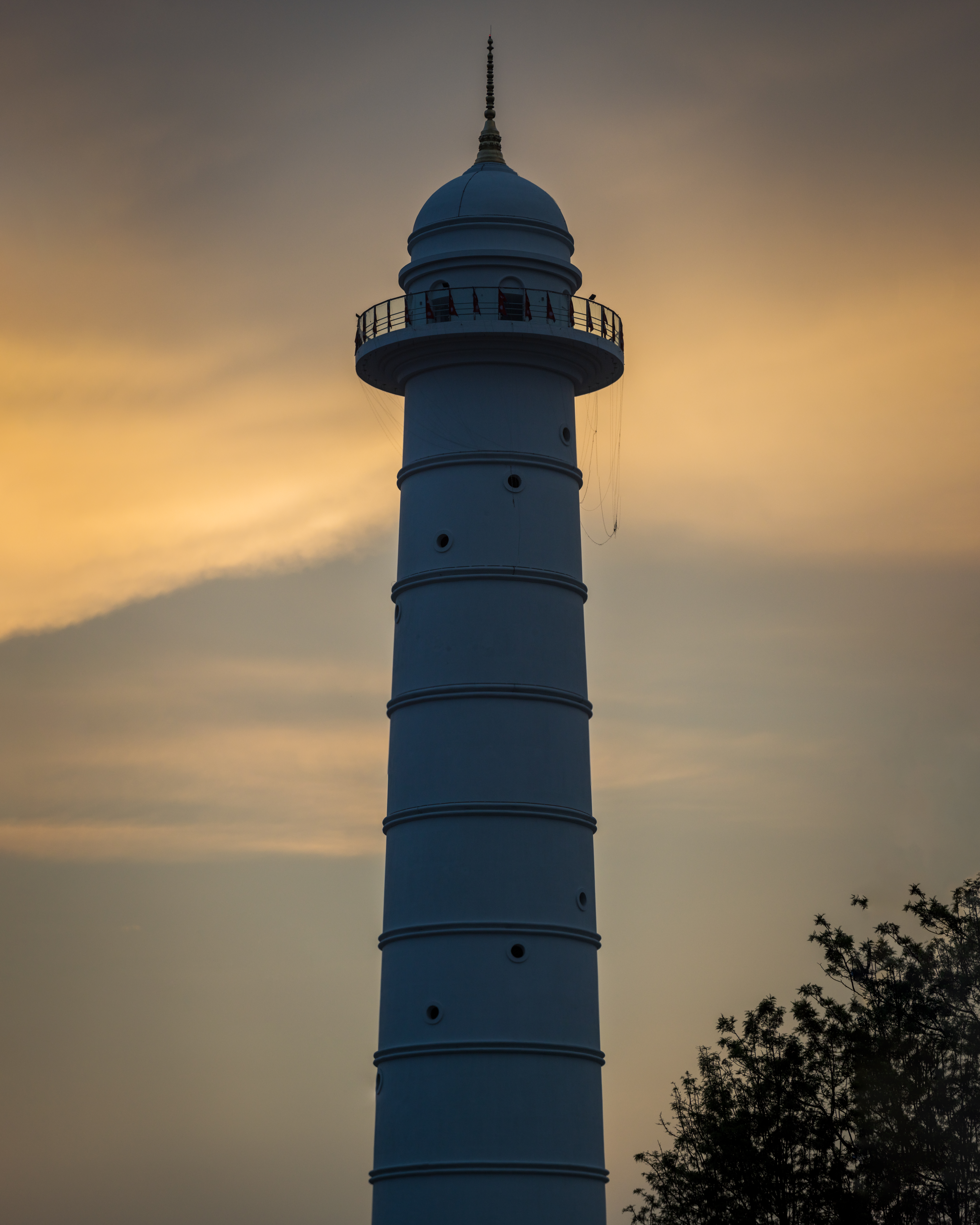
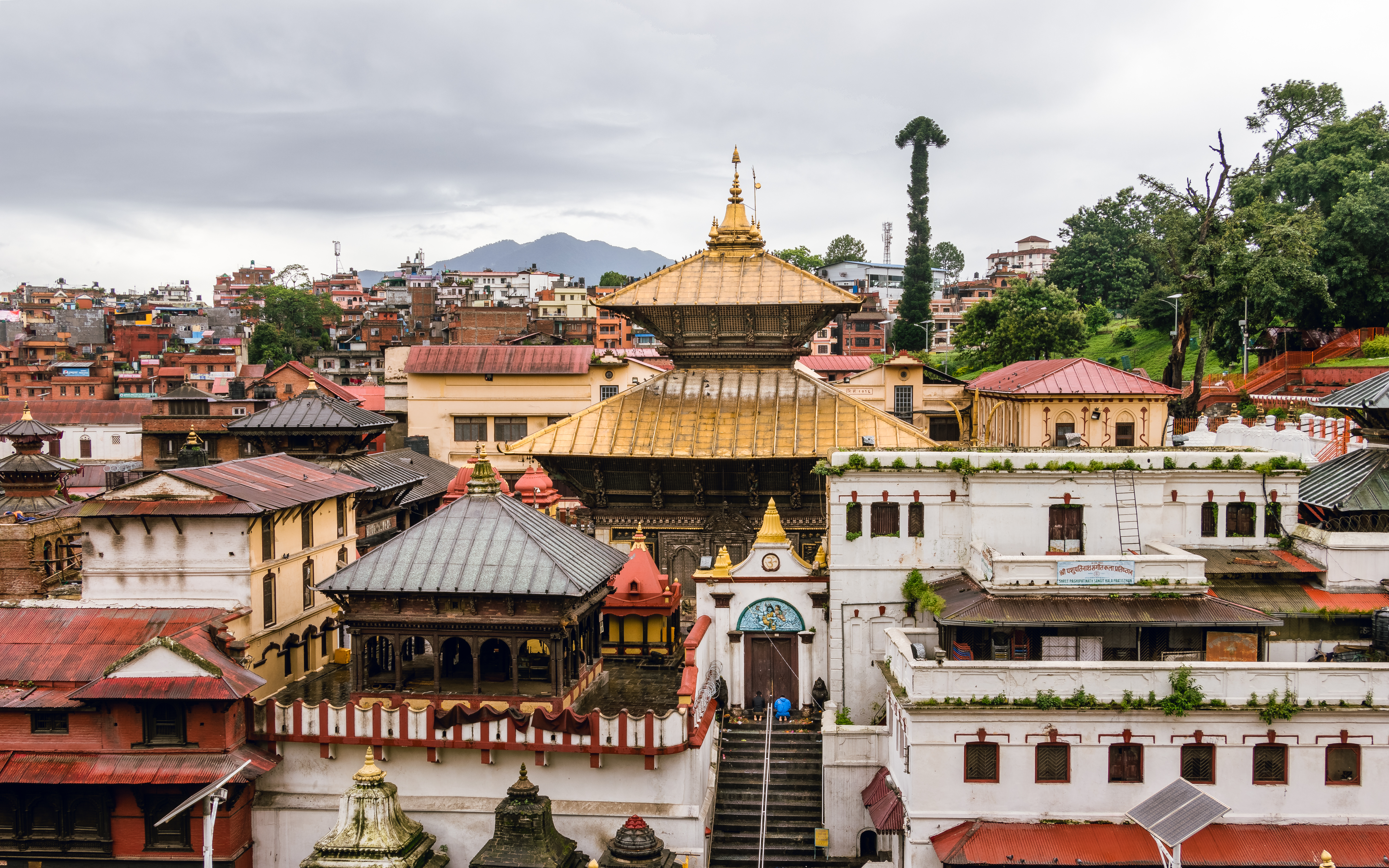
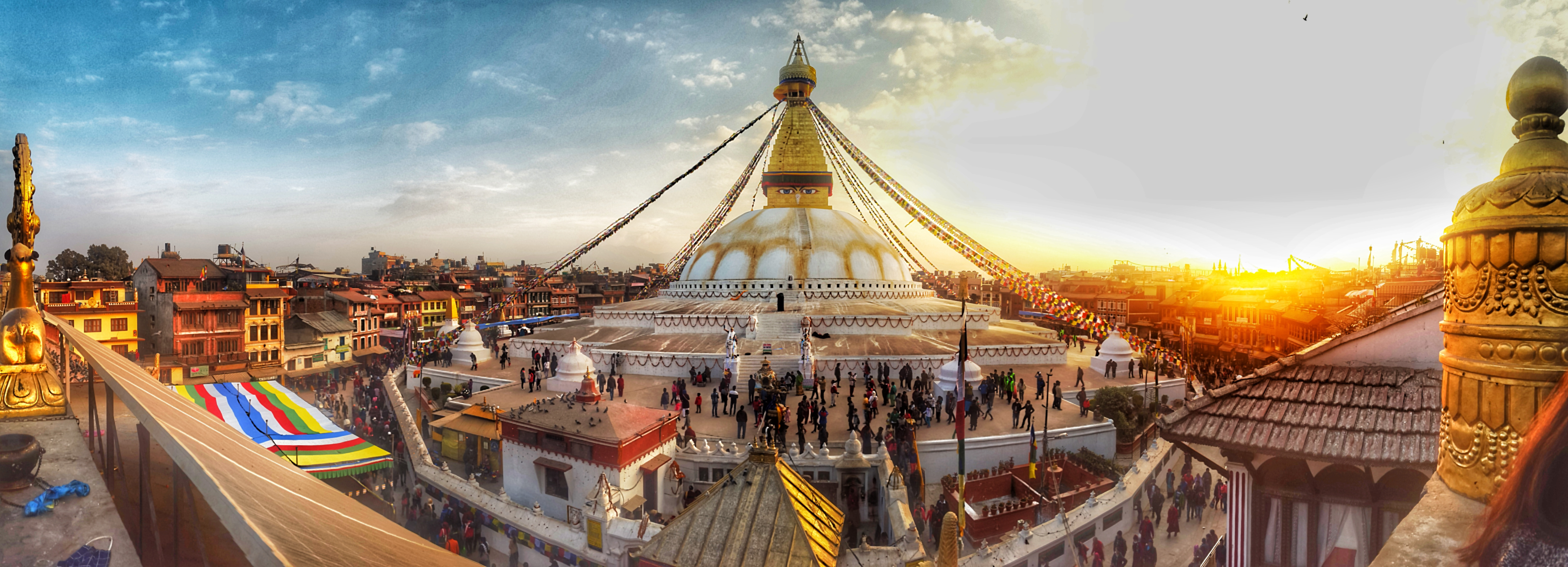
- Kathmandu Durbar Square Narayanhiti Palace Ghanta Ghar Dharahara Pashupatinath Temple Boudha Stupa at Boudhanath

- Flag Seal
- Motto(s): Nepali: सांस्कृतिक सहर, काठमाडौं महानगर, lit. 'Cultural City, Kathmandu Metropolitan City'
- Interactive map of Kathmandu
- Location within Bagmati Province Location within Nepal
- Coordinates: 27°42′36″N 85°19′12″E
- Country: Nepal
- Province: Bagmati Province
- District: Kathmandu
- Founder: Manjushri
- Named for: Kasthamandap
- No. of Wards: 32

Government
  - Type: Mayor–council government
  - Body: Kathmandu Metropolitan Government
  - Mayor: Vacant till date
  - Deputy mayor: Sunita Dangol (acting mayor)
  - Executive Officer: Saroj Guragain

Area
  - Capital and metropolitan city: 49.45 km^{2} (19.09 sq mi)
  - Metro: 899 km^{2} (347 sq mi)
- Elevation: 1,400 m (4,600 ft)

Population (2021)
  - Capital and metropolitan city: 856,767
  - Rank: 1st
  - Density: 17,103/km^{2} (44,300/sq mi)
  - Metro: Approximately 4 million
  - Metro rank: 1st
- Time zone: UTC+05:45 (NPT)
- Postal Code: 44600
- Area code: 01
- International airport: Tribhuwan International Airport
- Website: www.kathmandu.gov.np

Kathmandu (Note: /ˌkætmænˈduː/, Nepali: काठमाडौँ, pronounced [ˈkaʈʰmaɳɖu]; known as Yẽn (𑐫𑐾𑑃 𑐡𑐾𑐫𑑂 / येँ देय्, yem̐ dey; pronounced [jẽ deːj]) in Newar; officially the Kathmandu Metropolitan City (Nepali: काठमाडौँ महानगरपालिका, romanized: kāṭhamāḍaum̐ mahānagarapālikā, Newar: 𑐫𑐾𑑃 𑐩𑐴𑐵𑐣𑐐𑐬𑐥𑐵𑐮𑐶𑐎𑐵 / येँ महानगरपालिका, romanized: yem̐ mahānagarapālikā). The city is named after the Kasthamandap temple, a 16th-century structure built entirely of wood from a single tree, located in the historic Durbar Square, which itself derives from the Sanskrit words kāṣṭha ("wood") and maṇḍapa ("pavilion").) is the capital and largest city of Nepal, situated in the central part of the country within the Kathmandu Valley. The city is in Kathmandu District. Kathmandu is the main governmental, financial, industrial, and cultural centre of Nepal. As per the 2021 Nepal census, it has a population of 845,767 residing in 105,649 households, with approximately 4 million people in the surrounding metropolitan area. The city stands at an elevation of 1,324 metres (4,344 ft) above sea level. From ancient times until the medieval period, Kathmandu was known as Kantipur and is also referred to as Kasthamandap.

Recognized as one of the oldest continuously inhabited places in the world, Kathmandu's history dates back to the 2nd century AD. Historically known as the Nepal Mandala, the valley has been the cultural and political hub for the Newar people, a significant urban civilization in the Himalayan region. Kathmandu served as the royal capital of the Kingdom of Nepal and is home to numerous palaces, temples, and gardens that reflect its rich heritage. Since 1985, it has hosted the headquarters of the South Asian Association for Regional Cooperation (SAARC).

Today, Kathmandu remains the epicenter of Nepal's history, art, culture, and economy. It has a multi-ethnic population with a Hindu majority and a significant Vajrayana Buddhist presence. Religious and cultural festivals are integral to life in the city. Tourism plays a vital role in the economy, with the city serving as a gateway to the Nepal Himalayas. Kathmandu is home to several World Heritage Sites, including the Durbar Square, Swayambhu Mahachaitya, Bouddha, and Pashupatinath.

The Kathmandu Valley has been experiencing rapid urbanization, with a growth rate of 4% per year as of 2010, making it one of the fastest-growing metropolitan areas in South Asia.

== Etymology ==
The Nepali name Kathmandu comes from Kasthamandap. In Sanskrit, Kāṣṭha (काष्ठ) is "wood" and Maṇḍapa (मण्डप) is "pavilion".

This public pavilion, also known as Maru Satta in Newari, was rebuilt in 1596 by Biseth in the period of King Lakshmi Narasimha Malla. The three-storey structure is made entirely of wood and uses neither iron nails nor supports. According to legends, all the timber used to build the pagoda was obtained from a single tree.

The colophons of ancient manuscripts, dated as late as the 20th century, refer to Kathmandu as Kāṣṭhamaṇḍap Mahānagar in Nepal Mandala. Mahānagar means "great city". The city is called Kāṣṭhamaṇḍap in a vow that Buddhist priests still recite to this day. Thus, Kathmandu is also known as Kāṣṭhamaṇḍap. During medieval times, the city was sometimes called Kāntipur (Sanskrit: कान्तिपुर). This name is derived from two Sanskrit words – Kānti and Pur. Kānti is a word that stands for "beauty" and is mostly associated with light and Pur means place, thus giving it the meaning, "City of light".

Among the indigenous Newar people, Kathmandu is known as Yeṃ Dey (Newar: येँ देय्), and Patan and Bhaktapur are known as Yala Dey (Newar: यल देय्) and Khwopa Dey (Newar: ख्वप देय्) respectively. "Yen" is the shorter form of Yambu (Newar: यम्बु), which originally referred to the northern half of Kathmandu. The older northern settlements were referred to as Yambi while the southern settlement was known as Yangala.

== History ==
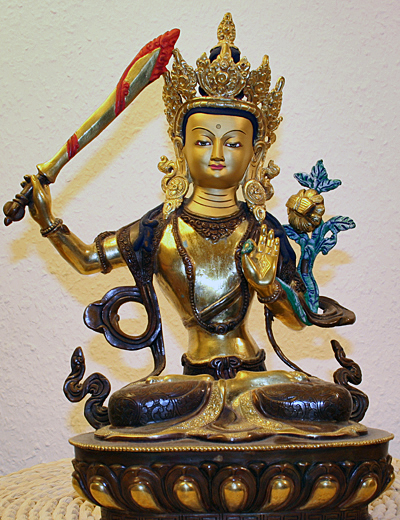
Manjushri, with his indestructible sword Chandrahasa, the Buddhist deity said to have created the valley

Archaeological excavations in parts of Kathmandu have found evidence of ancient civilizations. The oldest of these findings is a statue, found in Maligaon, that was dated at 185 AD. The excavation of Dhando Chaitya uncovered a brick with an inscription in Brahmi script. Archaeologists believe that it is two thousand years old. Stone inscriptions are ubiquitous elements at the heritage sites and are key sources for the history of Nepal.

The earliest Western reference to Kathmandu appears in an account of Portuguese Jesuit Father Joao Cabral who passed through the Kathmandu Valley in the spring of 1628 and was received graciously by the king of that time, probably King Lakshminarasimha Malla of Kathmandu on their way from Tibet to India. Father Cabral reported that they reached "Cadmendu", the capital of Nepal kingdom.

=== Ancient history ===
The ancient history of Kathmandu is described in its traditional myths and legends. According to the scripture of Swayambhu Purana, present-day Kathmandu was once a huge and deep lake where dwelt mythical serpents (Nāgas) like Karkotaka, Takshaka and Kulika and the Buddhas, bodhisattvas, hermits, yogis, gods and goddesses as well as other celestial beings used to come for ablution in its water. Vipassī Buddha, who lived ninety-one kalpas (aeon) ago, came on a pilgrimage and sowed the seed of a lotus in the lake which grew into a lotus flower with thousand petals. The flower emitted eternal radiant form of light with the Five Great Buddhas, Vairocana, Akshobhya, Ratnasambhava, Amitābha and Amoghasiddhi appearing on each side of the differently coloured rays of the light. Following on the footsteps of Vipassī Buddha, Sikhī Buddha and Vessabhū Buddha came to pay homage to the lotus flower thirty-one kalpas ago. Later on, Bodhisattva Manjushri came to the lake and pondered how to drain the lake so that people can traverse and pay homage to the radiant light. Out of his compassion, he drained the lake out of the valley by cutting the mountain with his indestructible sword; and created other lakes nearby to give shelter to the mythical serpents. The self-arisen ray of light in a thousand - petaled lotus came to be worshipped as Swayambhu. Manjushri then established a city called Manjupattan, and made Dharmakar the ruler of the valley land. After some time, a demon named Banasura closed the outlet, and the valley again turned into a lake. Krishna came to Nepal, killed Banasura, and again drained out the water by cutting the edge of Chobhar hill with this Sudarshana Chakra. He brought some cowherds along with him, and made Bhuktaman the king of Nepal.

Kotirudra Samhita of Shiva Purana, Chapter 11, Shloka 18 refers to the place as Nayapala city, which was famous for its Pashupati Shivalinga. The name Nepal probably originates from this city Nayapala. Very few historical records exists of the period before medieval Licchavi rulers. According to Gopalraj Vansawali, a genealogy of Nepali monarchy, the rulers of Kathmandu Valley before the Licchavis were Gopalas, Mahispalas, Aabhirs, Kirat, and Somavanshi. The Kirata dynasty was established by Yalamber. During the Kirata era, a settlement called Yambu existed in the northern half of old Kathmandu. In Kiranti languages, Kathmandu is still referred to as Yambu (sometimes Yelakhom). Another smaller settlement called Yengal was present in the southern half of old Kathmandu, near Manjupattan. During the reign of the seventh Kirata ruler, Jitedasti, Buddhist monks entered Kathmandu valley and established a forest monastery at Sankhu.

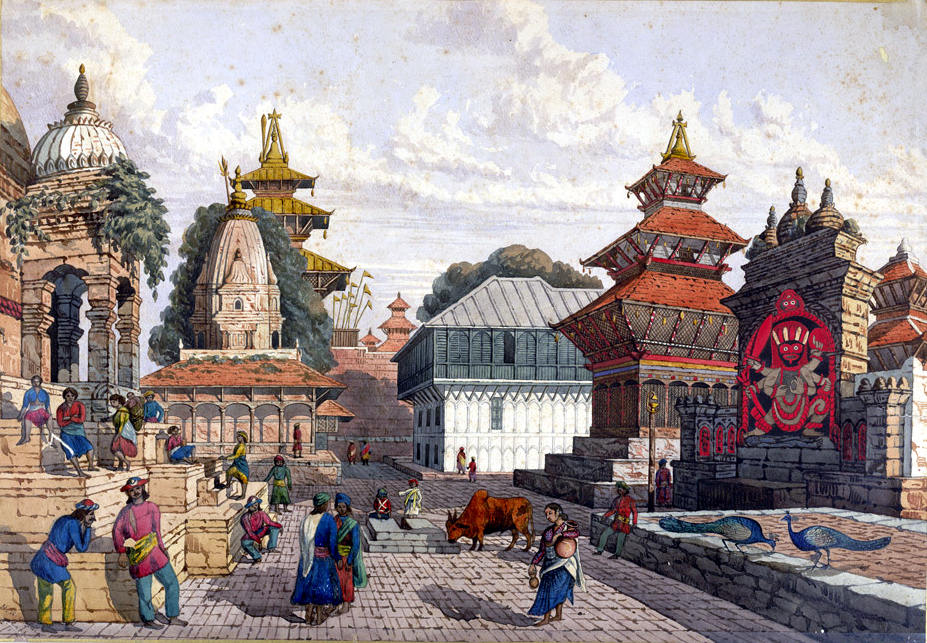
Kathmandu Durbar Square, 1852

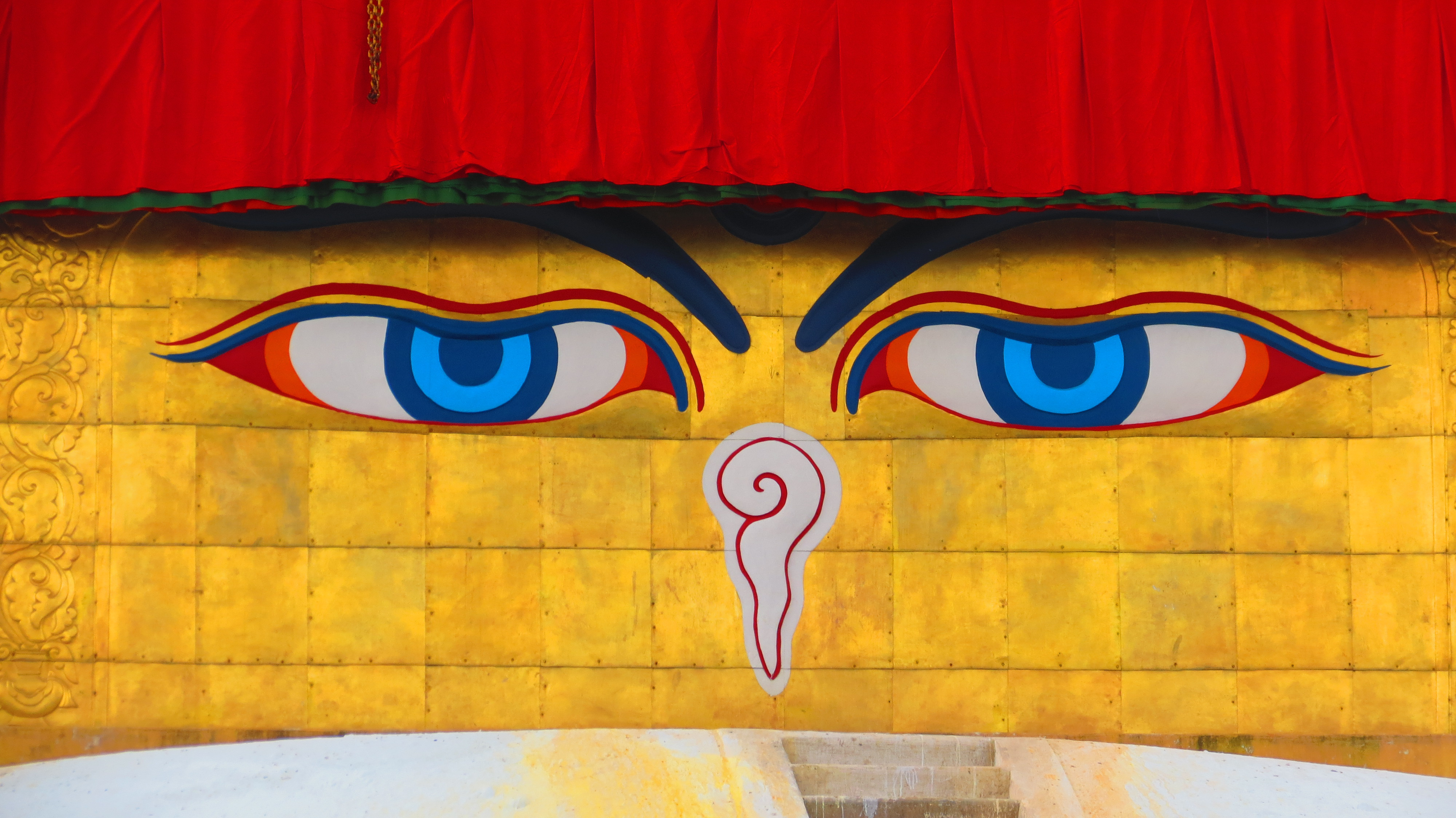
The eyes of Boudhanath, a UNESCO World Heritage, associated with the relics of Kassapa Buddha and Shakyamuni Buddha

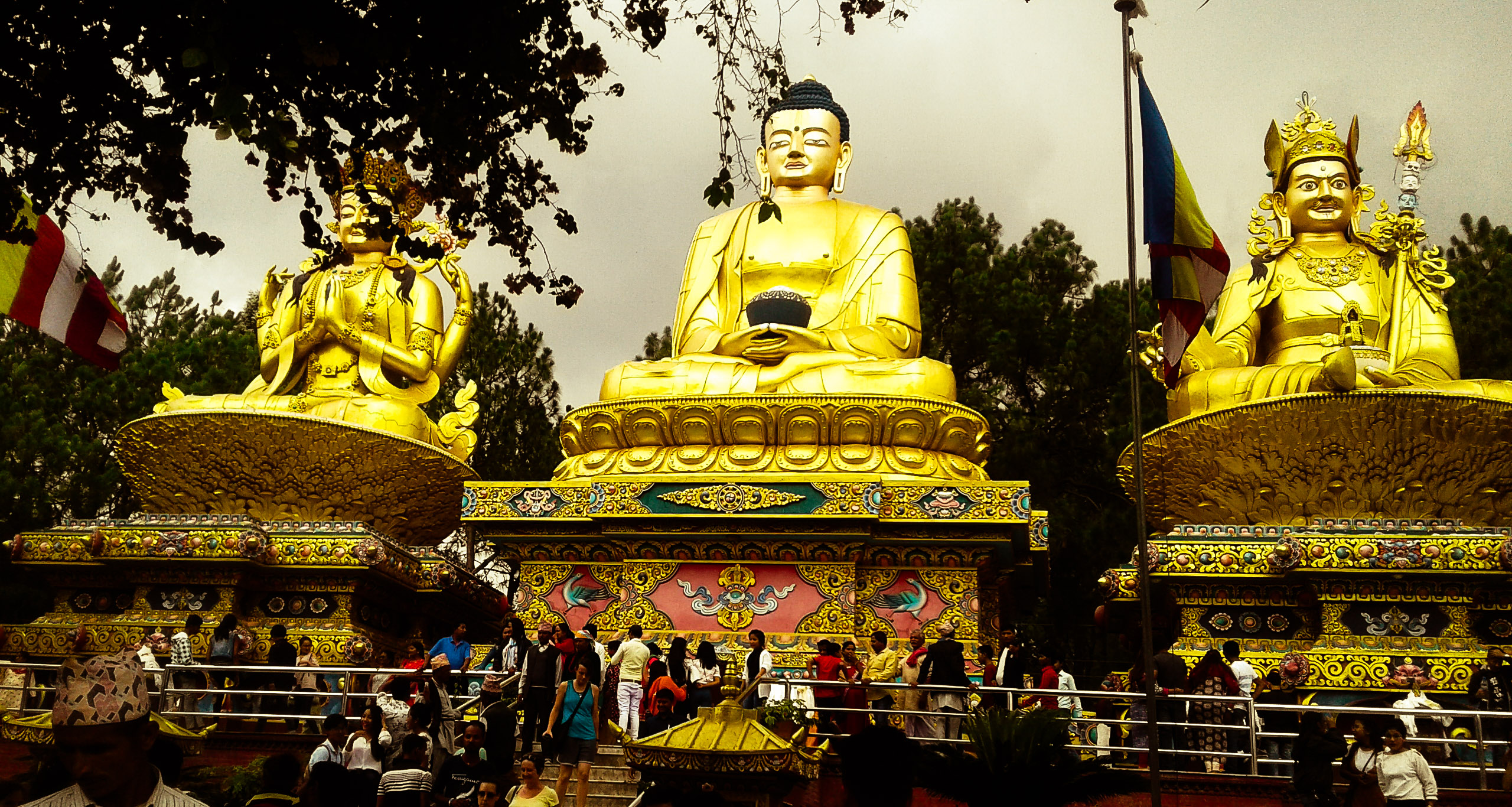
Seated Buddha statues in Swayambhunath, one of the ancient pilgrimage sites of Kathmandu and a UNESCO World Heritage site

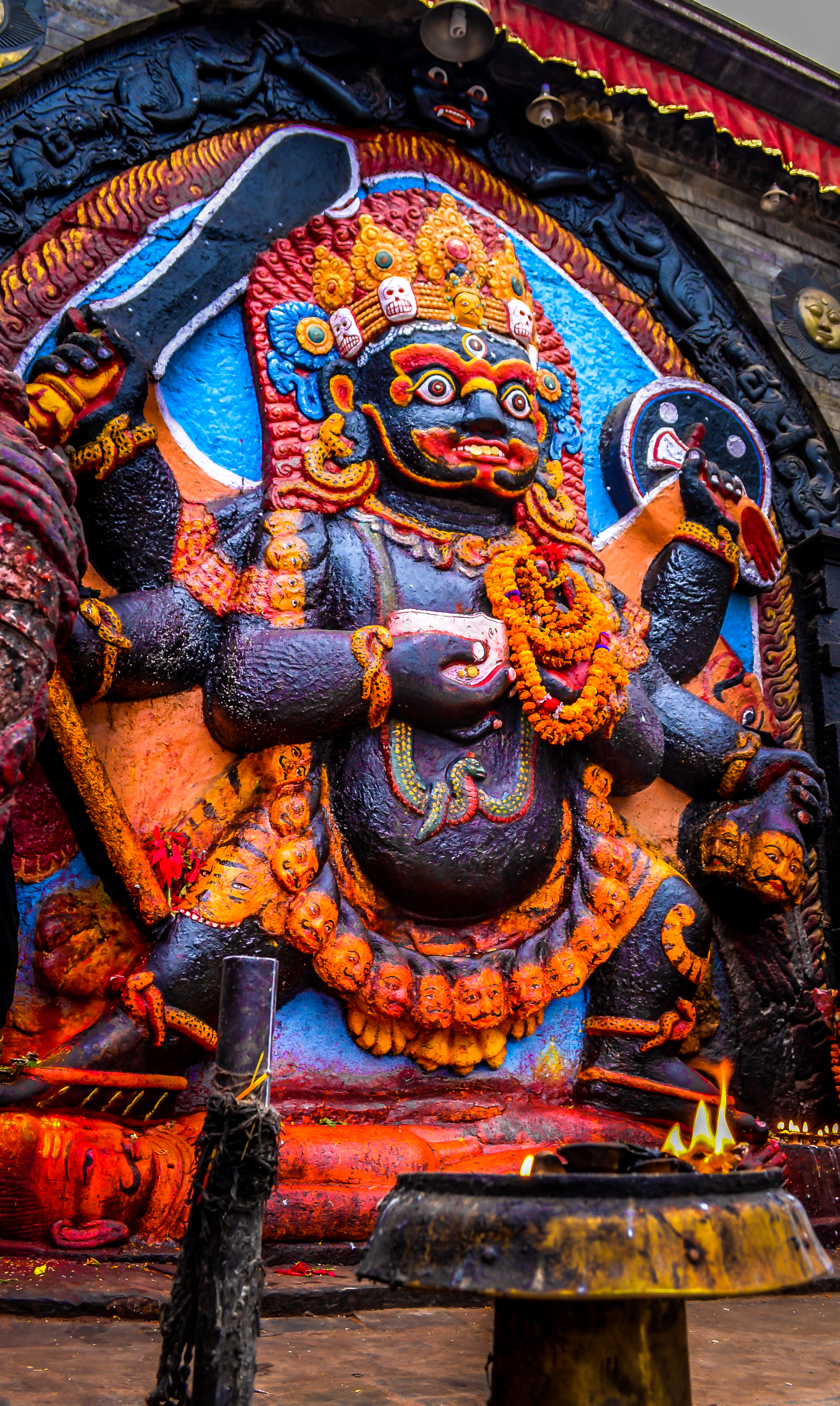
Temple of Kala Bhairava, a fearsome form of Shiva, worshipped by both Hindus and Buddhists as the 'lord of time and death' at Hanumandhoka palace of Malla era

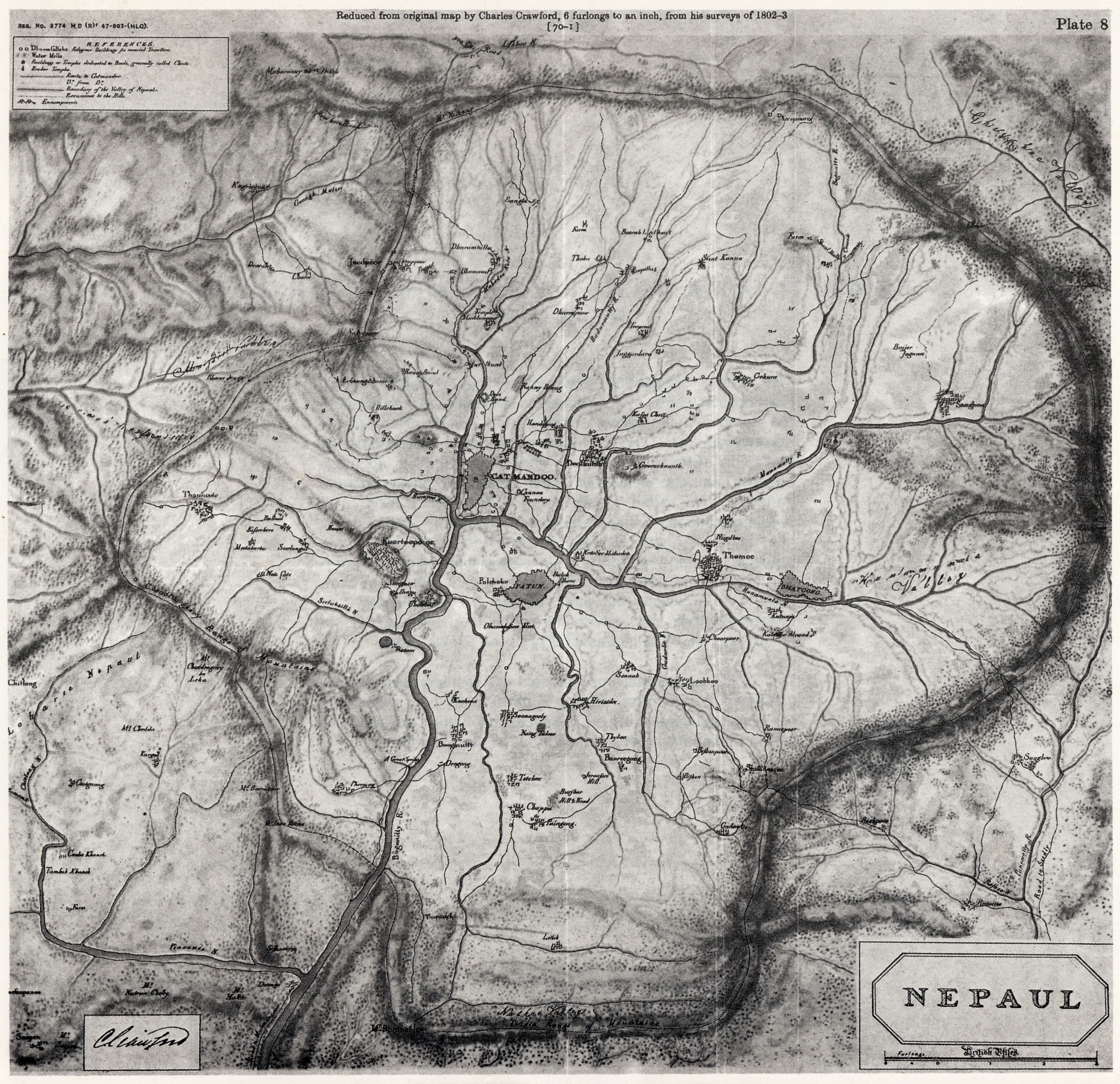
Scan of map of Nepaul, present-day Kathmandu Valley and surrounding areas in Nepal, reduced from original map by Francis Buchanan-Hamilton and Charles Crawford from surveys in 1802.

==== Licchavi era ====
The Licchavis from Vaisali in modern-day Bihar migrated north and defeated the Kirats, establishing the Licchavi dynasty circa 400 AD. During this era, following the genocide of Shakyas in Lumbini by Virudhaka, the survivors migrated north and entered the forest monastery, masquerading as Koliyas. From Sankhu, they migrated to Yambu and Yengal (Lanjagwal and Manjupattan) and established the first permanent Buddhist monasteries of Kathmandu. This created the basis of Newar Buddhism, which is the only surviving Sanskrit-based Buddhist tradition in the world. With their migration, Yambu was called Koligram and Yengal was called Dakshin Koligram during most of the Licchavi era.

Eventually, the Licchavi ruler Gunakamadeva merged Koligram and Dakshin Koligram, founding the city of Kathmandu. The city was designed in the shape of Chandrahrasa, the sword of Manjushri. The city was surrounded by eight barracks guarded by Ajimas. One of these barracks is still in use at Bhadrakali (in front of Singha Durbar). The city served as an important transit point in the trade between India and Tibet, leading to tremendous growth in architecture. Descriptions of buildings such as Managriha, Kailaskut Bhawan, and Bhadradiwas Bhawan have been found in the surviving journals of travellers and monks who lived during this era. For example, the famous 7th-century Chinese traveller Xuanzang described Kailaskut Bhawan, the palace of the Licchavi king Amshuverma.

The trade route also led to cultural exchange as well. The artistry of the Newar people—the indigenous inhabitants of the Kathmandu Valley—became highly sought after during this era, both within the Valley and throughout the greater Himalayas. Newar artists travelled extensively throughout Asia, creating religious art for their neighbours. For example, Araniko led a group of his compatriot artists through Tibet and China. Bhrikuti, the princess of Nepal who married Tibetan monarch Songtsän Gampo, was instrumental in introducing Buddhism to Tibet.

==== Malla era ====
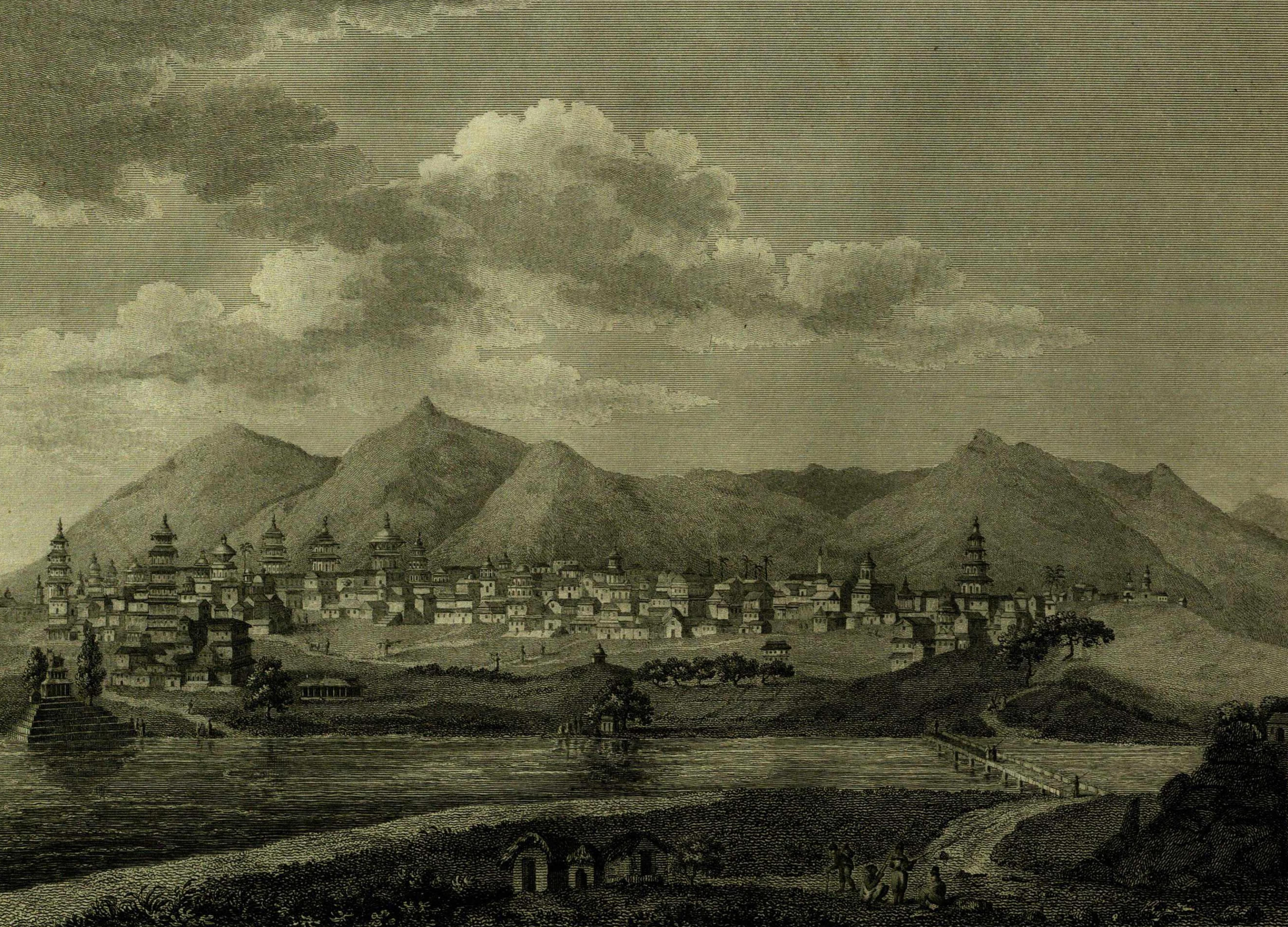
Skyline of Kathmandu, c. 1811

The Licchavi era was followed by the Malla era. Rulers from Tirhut, upon being attacked by the Delhi Sultanate, fled north to the Kathmandu valley. They intermarried with Nepali royalty, and this led to the Malla era. The early years of the Malla era were turbulent, with raids and attacks from Khas and Turk Muslims. There was also a devastating earthquake which claimed the lives of a third of Kathmandu's population, including the king Abhaya Malla. These disasters led to the destruction of most of the architecture of the Licchavi era (such as Mangriha and Kailashkut Bhawan), and the loss of literature collected in various monasteries within the city. Despite the initial hardships, Kathmandu rose to prominence again and, during most of the Malla era, dominated the trade between India and Tibet. Nepali currency became the standard currency in trans-Himalayan trade.

During the later part of the Malla era, Kathmandu Valley comprised four fortified cities: Kantipur, Lalitpur, Bhaktapur, and Kirtipur. These served as the capitals of the Malla confederation of Nepal. These states competed with each other in the arts, architecture, esthetics, and trade, resulting in tremendous development. The kings of this period directly influenced or involved themselves in the construction of public buildings, squares, and temples, as well as the development of waterspouts, the institutionalisation of trusts (called guthis), the codification of laws, the writing of dramas, and the performance of plays in city squares. Evidence of an influx of ideas from India, Tibet, China, Persia, and Europe among other places can be found in a stone inscription from the time of king Pratap Malla. Books have been found from this era that describe their tantric tradition (e.g. Tantrakhyan), medicine (e.g. Haramekhala), religion (e.g. Mooldevshashidev), law, morals, and history. Amarkosh, a Sanskrit-Nepal Bhasa dictionary from 1381, was also found. Architecturally notable buildings from this era include Kathmandu Durbar Square, Patan Durbar Square, Bhaktapur Durbar Square, the former durbar of Kirtipur, Nyatapola, Kumbheshwar, the Krishna temple, and others.

=== Medieval era ===
==== Early Shah rule ====
The Gorkha Kingdom ended the Malla confederation after the Battle of Kathmandu in 1768. This marked the beginning of the modern era in Kathmandu. The Battle of Kirtipur was the start of the Gorkha conquest of the Kathmandu Valley. Kathmandu was adopted as the capital of the Gorkha empire, and the empire itself was dubbed Nepal. During the early part of this era, Kathmandu maintained its distinctive culture. Buildings with characteristic Nepali architecture, such as the nine-story tower of Basantapur, were built during this era. However, trade declined because of continual war with neighbouring nations. Bhimsen Thapa supported France against Great Britain; this led to the development of modern military structures, such as modern barracks in Kathmandu. The nine-storey tower Dharahara was originally built during this era.

==== Rana rule ====
Rana rule over Nepal started with the Kot massacre of 1846, which occurred near Hanuman Dhoka Durbar. During this massacre, most of Nepal's high-ranking officials were massacred by Jung Bahadur Rana and his supporters. Another massacre, the Bhandarkhal Massacre, was also conducted by Kunwar and his supporters in Kathmandu. During the Rana regime, Kathmandu's alliance shifted from anti-British to pro-British; this led to the construction of the first buildings in the style of Western European architecture. The most well-known of these buildings include Singha Durbar, Garden of Dreams, Shital Niwas, and the old Narayanhiti palace. The first modern commercial road in the Kathmandu Valley, the New Road, was also built during this era. Trichandra College (the first college of Nepal), Durbar High School (the first modern school of Nepal), and Bir Hospital (the first hospital of Nepal) were built in Kathmandu during this era. Education was only accessible to the privileged class. Rana rule was marked by despotism, economic exploitation and religious persecution.

=== Modern History (2000-Present) ===
The turn of the 21st century brought major political and social upheavals to Kathmandu. In June 2001, the Nepalese royal massacre at Narayanhiti Palace claimed the lives of King Birendra, Queen Aishwarya, Crown Prince Dipendra, and several others, and following Dipendra's brief, comatose reign, Gyanendra was appointed king. After the 2006 Revolution, it was turned into a museum.

Kathmandu later became the center of the 2006 People's Movement (Jana Andolan II), when widespread protests forced King Gyanendra to restore parliament on 24 April 2006 and set Nepal on the path toward becoming a federal democratic republic.

On 28 May 2008, the newly elected Constituent Assembly, meeting in Kathmandu, voted 560 to 4 to abolish the monarchy and declare Nepal a republic. King Gyanendra was given 15 days to leave the royal palace.

On 25 April 2015, a magnitude 7.8 earthquake struck Nepal, killing 8,856 people. In Kathmandu, the Dharahara tower collapsed, killing 132 people, and Kathmandu Durbar Square was severely damaged.

On 28 February 2025, a magnitude 6.1 earthquake struck north of Kathmandu, Nepal, according to the National Earthquake Monitoring and Research Centre. The quake, centered in Sindhupalchok District near the Himalayan border with Tibet, was measured at magnitudes ranging from 5.5 to 6.1 by different agencies. Despite strong tremors that startled residents, no significant damage or casualties were reported, except for a minor landslide and a prison inmate who sustained a broken hand while fleeing. Local officials confirmed structural cracks in a police post but no major destruction.

In September 2025, widespread Gen Z protests erupted in Kathmandu after the government imposed a ban on multiple social media platforms. The protests quickly grew to include complaints about corruption, nepotism, and lack of opportunity. The army was deployed on the streets of Kathmandu, and many government buildings and residences of important government officials were burnt. Security forces responded with lethal force, resulting in dozens of casualties and major damage to government property, and the prime minister eventually resigned. Following the unrest, President Ram Chandra Poudel appointed former Supreme Court Chief Justice Sushila Karki as Nepal's first female prime minister, and parliament was dissolved with fresh elections scheduled for March 2026.

In the general election held on 5 March 2026, the first since the protests, the Rastriya Swatantra Party won 182 of the 275 seats in the House of Representatives. Its leader, former Kathmandu mayor Balendra Shah, was sworn in as prime minister on 27 March 2026.

== Geography ==
Kathmandu is in the northwestern part of the Kathmandu Valley to the north of the Bagmati River and covers an area of 50.7 km^{2} (19.6 sq mi). The average elevation is 1,400 metres (4,600 ft) above sea level. The city is bounded by several other municipalities of the Kathmandu valley: south of the Bagmati by Lalitpur Metropolitan City (Patan), with which it forms one urban area surrounded by a ring road, to the southwest by Kirtipur and to the east by Madyapur Thimi. To the north the urban area extends into several municipalities; Nagarjun, Tarakeshwor, Tokha, Budhanilkantha, Gokarneshwor and Kageshwori Manohara. However, the urban agglomeration extends well beyond the neighbouring municipalities, e.g. to Bhaktapur, and nearly covers the entire Kathmandu Valley.

Kathmandu is dissected by eight rivers, the main river of the valley, the Bagmati and its tributaries, of which the Bishnumati, Dhobi Khola, Manohara Khola, Hanumante Khola, and Tukucha Khola are predominant. The mountains from where these rivers originate are in the elevation range of 1,500–3,000 metres (4,900–9,800 ft), and have passes which provide access to and from Kathmandu and its valley. An ancient canal once flowed from Nagarjuna Hill through Balaju to Kathmandu; this canal is now extinct.

The city of Kathmandu and the surrounding valley are in the Deciduous Monsoon Forest Zone (altitude range of 1,200–2,100 metres (3,900–6,900 ft)), one of five vegetation zones defined for Nepal. The dominant tree species in this zone are oak, elm, beech, maple and others, with coniferous trees at higher altitude.

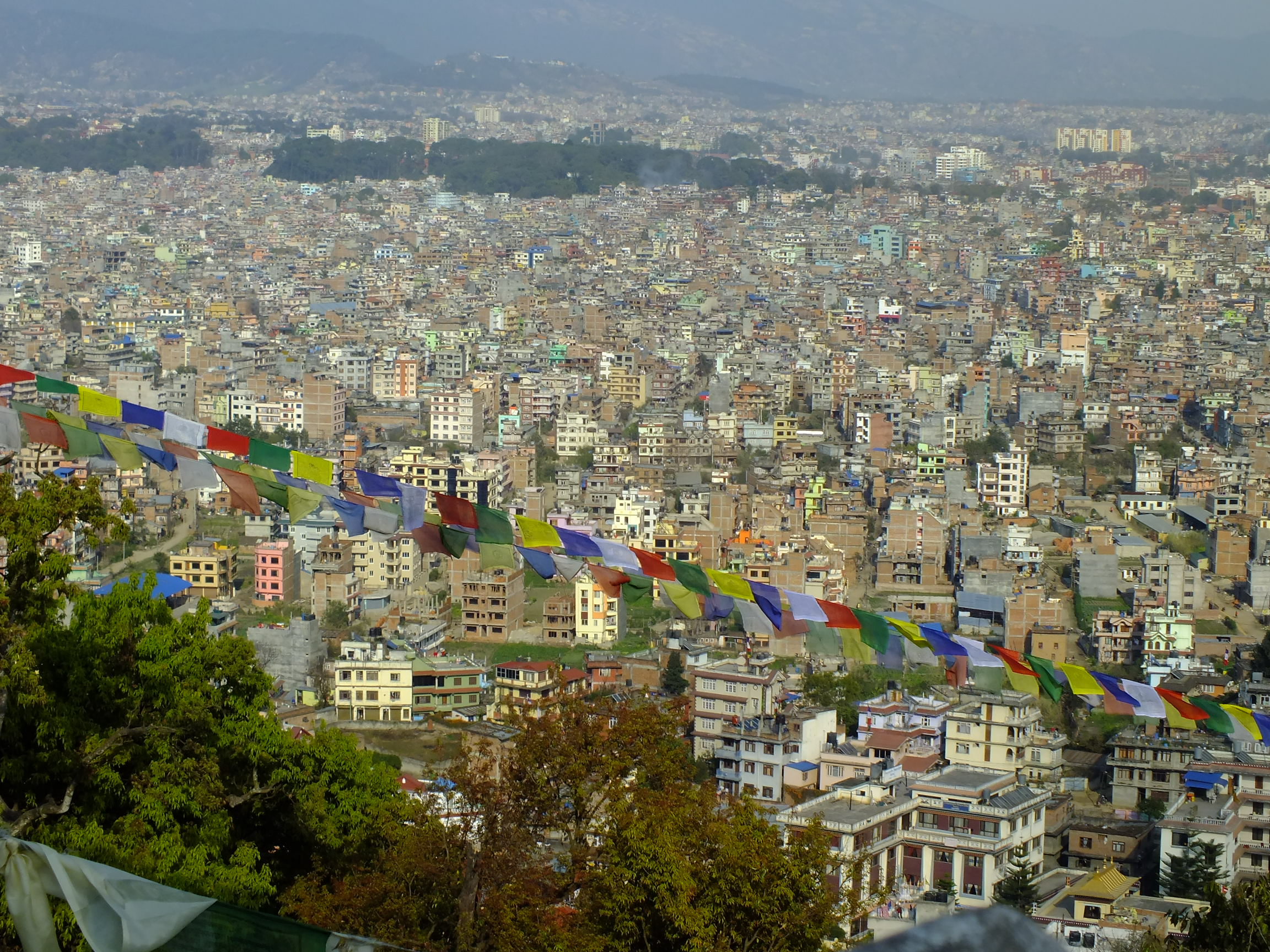
Haphazard settlement seen near Swoyambhu, 2015.

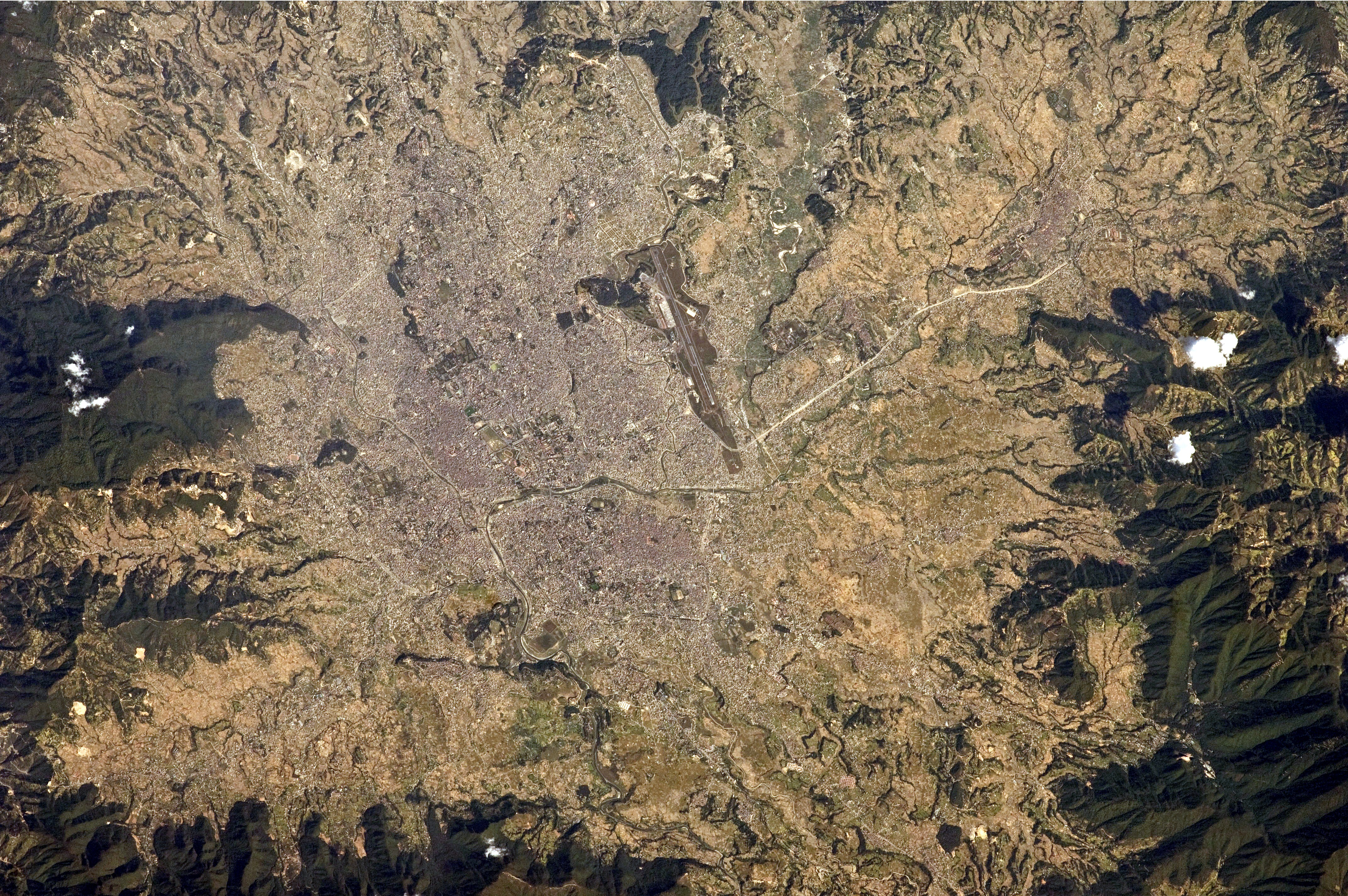
The green, vegetated slopes that surround the Kathmandu metro area (light grey, image centre) include both forest reserves and national parks

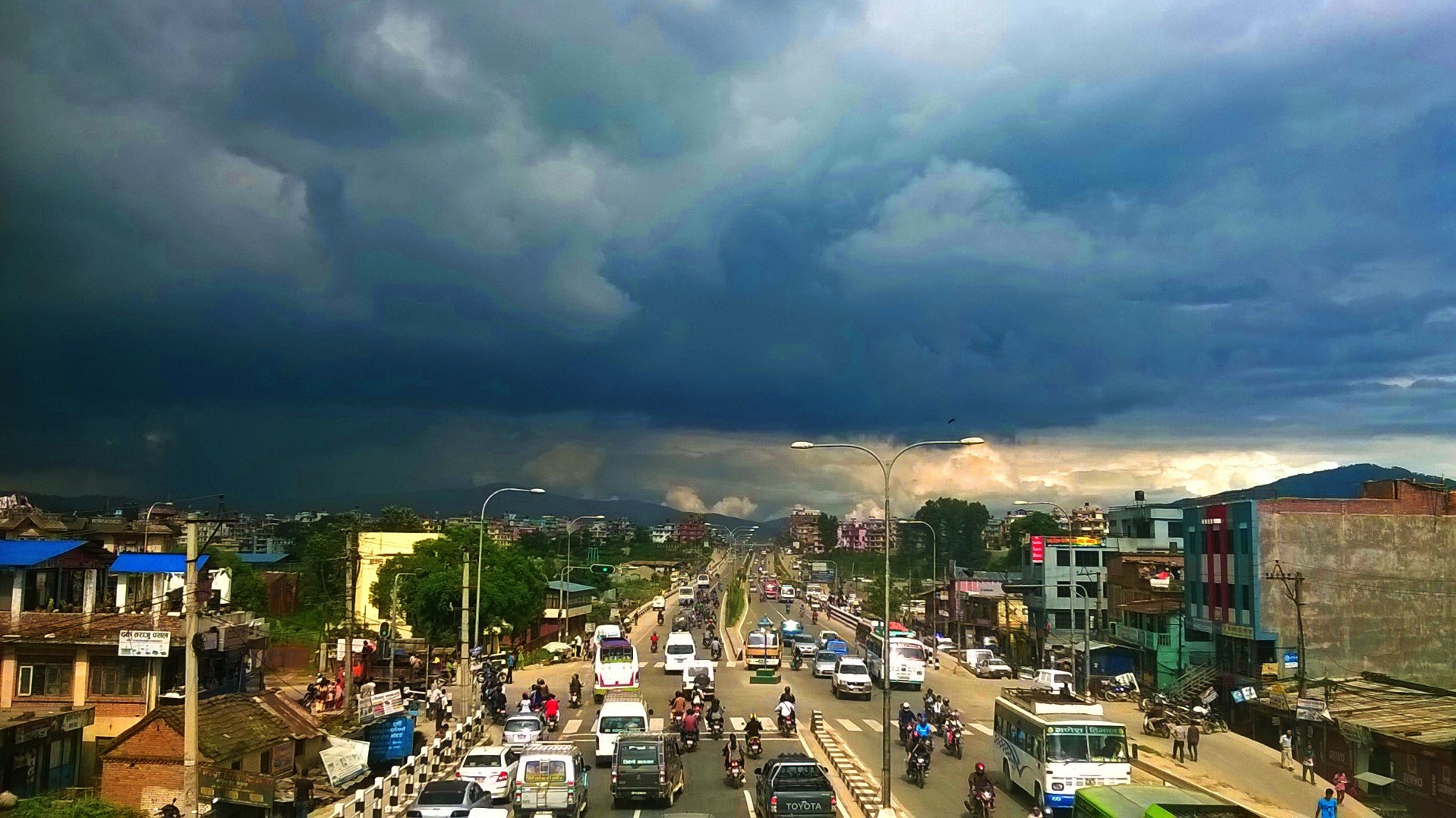
Araniko Highway connects Kathmandu to Bhaktapur and onwards to the Chinese border.

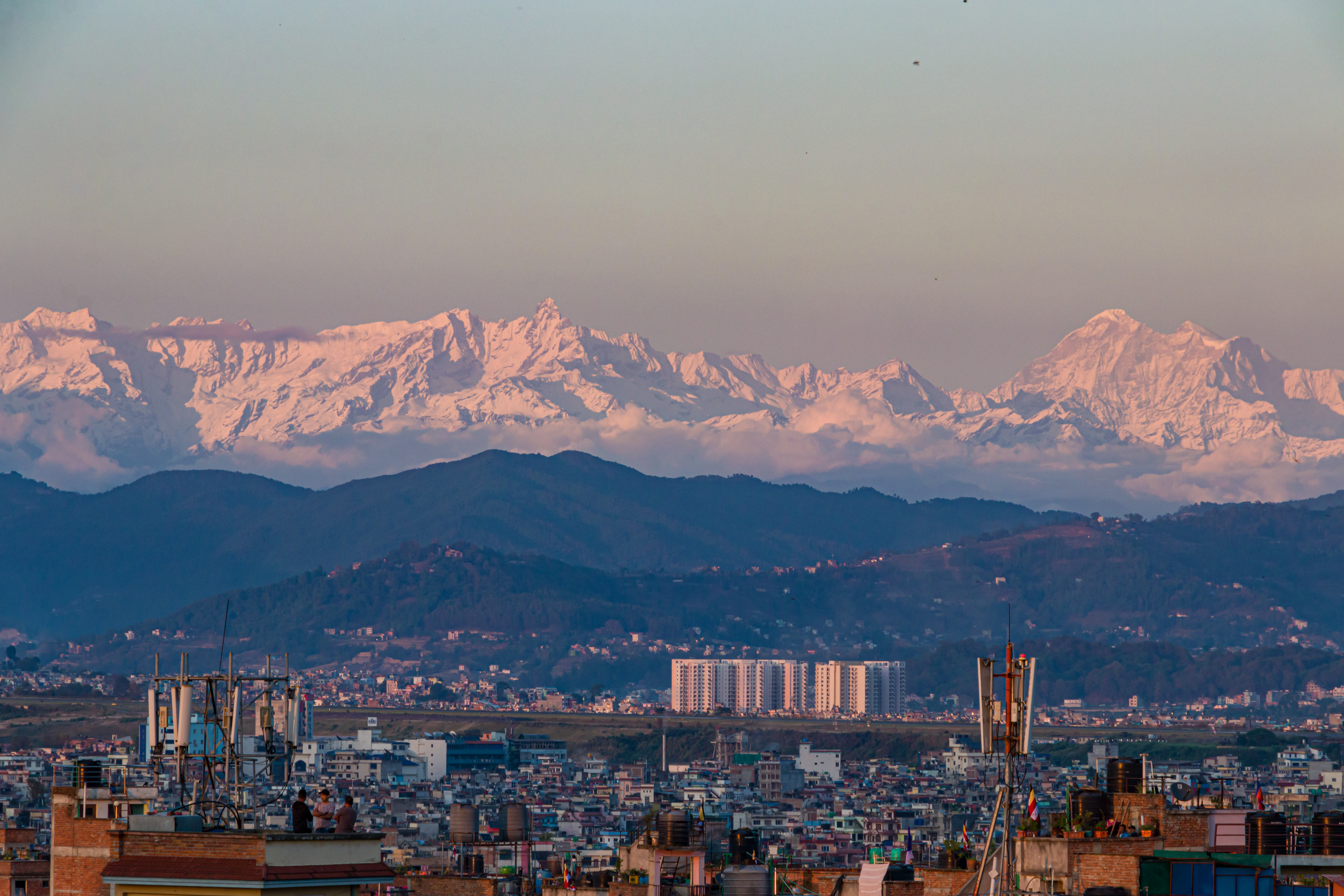
Northeastern Kathmandu with Gaurishankar in background.
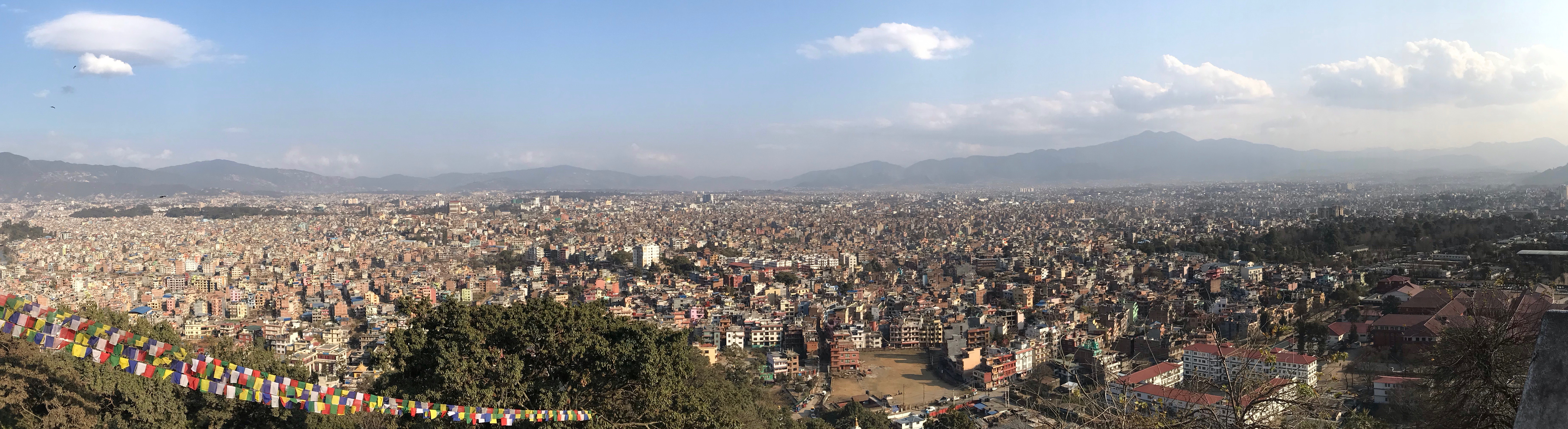
Panoramic view of the Kathmandu valley from Swayambhu

=== Kathmandu administration ===
Kathmandu and adjacent cities are composed of neighbourhoods, which are utilized quite extensively and more familiar among locals. However, administratively the city is divided into 32 wards, numbered from 1 to 32. Earlier, there were 35 wards which made it the metropolitan city with the largest number of wards.

| Ward No | Administrative Ward | Population (2021 Census) |
|---|---|---|
| 1 | Naxal | 8,008 |
| 2 | Lazimpat | 13,448 |
| 3 | Maharajgunj | 34,866 |
| 4 | Baluwatar | 47,362 |
| 5 | Hadigaun | 18,320 |
| 6 | Boudha | 60,344 |
| 7 | Mitrapark | 51,581 |
| 8 | Jayabageshwori | 10,738 |
| 9 | Gaushala | 40,371 |
| 10 | Baneshwor | 39,820 |
| 11 | Bag Durbar | 17,765 |
| 12 | Teku | 13,262 |
| 13 | Kalimati | 40,456 |
| 14 | Kalanki | 58,495 |
| 15 | Dallu | 54,476 |
| 16 | Balaju | 84,441 |
| 17 | Chhetrapati | 25,926 |
| 18 | Naradevi | 10,746 |
| 19 | Damaitol | 10,711 |
| 20 | Bhimsensthan | 10,968 |
| 21 | Jyawahal | 13,727 |
| 22 | Tewahal | 9,187 |
| 23 | Ombahal | 8,357 |
| 24 | Makhan Tole | 7,619 |
| 25 | Masangalli | 13,203 |
| 26 | Lainchaur | 45,052 |
| 27 | Mahaboudha | 8,563 |
| 28 | Old Buspark | 16,211 |
| 29 | Anamnagar | 33,316 |
| 30 | Gyaneshwor | 25,694 |
| 31 | Shantinagar | 66,121 |
| 32 | Koteshwor | 76,299 |
| | TOTAL | 862,400 |

=== Climate ===
Kathmandu

Climate chart (precipitation, max. and min. temperature)
| J | F | M | A | M | J | J | A | S | O | N | D |
| 14 19 2 | 19 21 5 | 34 25 8 | 61 28 12 | 124 29 16 | 236 29 19 | 363 28 20 | 331 29 20 | 200 28 19 | 51 27 13 | 8.3 24 8 | 13 20 4 |
- █ Average max. and min. temperatures in °C
- █ Precipitation totals in mm
Imperial conversion
| J | F | M | A | M | J | J | A | S | O | N | D |
| 0.6 66 36 | 0.7 70 41 | 1.3 77 46 | 2.4 82 54 | 4.9 84 61 | 9.3 84 66 | 14 82 68 | 13 84 68 | 7.9 82 66 | 2 81 55 | 0.3 75 46 | 0.5 68 39 |
- █ Average max. and min. temperatures in °F
- █ Precipitation totals in inches

Under Köppen's climate classification, portions of the city at lower elevations (1300-1400m), which make up 88% of the total area, have a humid subtropical climate (Cwa), while portions of the city with higher elevations generally have a subtropical highland climate (Cwb). In the Kathmandu Valley, which is representative of its valley's climate, the average summer temperature varies from 22 to 25 °C (72 to 77 °F). The average winter temperature is 10.1 °C (50.2 °F). Five major climatic regions are found in Nepal. Of these, High hills of Kathmandu Valley including Chandragiri hill is in the Warm Temperate Zone (elevation ranging from 1,200 to 2,300 metres (3,900 to 7,500 ft)), where the climate is fairly temperate, atypical for the region. This zone is followed by the Cool Temperate Zone with elevation varying between 2,100 and 3,300 metres (6,900 and 10,800 ft).

The city generally has a climate with warm days followed by cool nights and mornings. Unpredictable weather is expected, given that temperatures can drop to 0 °C (32 °F) or less during the winter. The lowest ever temperature of −3.5 °C was recorded in 1978. While snowfall is generally confined to the hills surrounding the city, there have been a few instances of snowfall in city, most notably in 1945 and 2007.

Rainfall is mostly monsoon-based (about 65% of the total concentrated during the monsoon months of June to September), and decreases substantially (100 to 200 cm (39 to 79 in)) from eastern Nepal to western Nepal. The average annual rainfall for the city is around 1400 mm (55 in). On average humidity is 75%. The chart below is based on data from the Nepal Bureau of Standards & Meteorology, Weather Meteorology for 2005. The chart provides minimum and maximum temperatures during each month. The annual amount of precipitation was 1,124 millimetres (44.3 in) for 2005, as per monthly data included in the table above. The decade of 2000–2010 saw highly variable and unprecedented precipitation anomalies in Kathmandu. This was mostly due to the annual variation of the southwest monsoon. For example, 2001 recorded only 356 mm (14 in) of precipitation due to an extraordinarily weak monsoon season. In contrast, 2003 was the wettest year ever in Kathmandu, totaling over 2,900 mm (114 in) of precipitation due to an exceptionally strong monsoon season.

Climate data for Kathmandu (Tribhuvan International Airport), elevation 1,337 m (4,386 ft) (1991–2020 normals, extremes 1968–present)
| Month | Jan | Feb | Mar | Apr | May | Jun | Jul | Aug | Sep | Oct | Nov | Dec | Year |
|---|---|---|---|---|---|---|---|---|---|---|---|---|---|
| Record high °C (°F) | 27.4 (81.3) | 29.2 (84.6) | 31.6 (88.9) | 35.6 (96.1) | 36.6 (97.9) | 35.2 (95.4) | 34.6 (94.3) | 32.6 (90.7) | 33.2 (91.8) | 31.9 (89.4) | 30.0 (86.0) | 25.2 (77.4) | 36.6 (97.9) |
| Mean daily maximum °C (°F) | 19.2 (66.6) | 22.1 (71.8) | 26.0 (78.8) | 28.6 (83.5) | 29.2 (84.6) | 29.5 (85.1) | 28.7 (83.7) | 29.0 (84.2) | 28.6 (83.5) | 27.2 (81.0) | 23.6 (74.5) | 20.2 (68.4) | 26.0 (78.8) |
| Daily mean °C (°F) | 11.0 (51.8) | 13.7 (56.7) | 17.4 (63.3) | 20.5 (68.9) | 22.7 (72.9) | 24.4 (75.9) | 24.5 (76.1) | 24.6 (76.3) | 23.7 (74.7) | 20.6 (69.1) | 16.0 (60.8) | 12.2 (54.0) | 19.3 (66.7) |
| Mean daily minimum °C (°F) | 2.8 (37.0) | 5.3 (41.5) | 8.8 (47.8) | 12.3 (54.1) | 16.1 (61.0) | 19.3 (66.7) | 20.3 (68.5) | 20.2 (68.4) | 18.8 (65.8) | 13.9 (57.0) | 8.4 (47.1) | 4.2 (39.6) | 12.5 (54.5) |
| Record low °C (°F) | −3.5 (25.7) | −2.4 (27.7) | 0.5 (32.9) | 3.5 (38.3) | 8.7 (47.7) | 11.1 (52.0) | 13.1 (55.6) | 13.0 (55.4) | 11.8 (53.2) | 5.8 (42.4) | 1.3 (34.3) | −1.9 (28.6) | −3.5 (25.7) |
| Average precipitation mm (inches) | 15.2 (0.60) | 23.6 (0.93) | 38.0 (1.50) | 62.9 (2.48) | 128.8 (5.07) | 241.4 (9.50) | 384.1 (15.12) | 342.7 (13.49) | 207.8 (8.18) | 43.3 (1.70) | 6.4 (0.25) | 7.8 (0.31) | 1,502 (59.13) |
| Average precipitation days (≥ 1.0 mm) | 1.9 | 2.6 | 3.9 | 6.6 | 11.9 | 16.9 | 23.1 | 22.7 | 14.6 | 3.8 | 0.5 | 0.7 | 109.4 |
| Average relative humidity (%) | 79 | 71 | 61 | 53 | 57 | 73 | 81 | 83 | 82 | 79 | 85 | 80 | 74 |
| Mean monthly sunshine hours | 210 | 209 | 236 | 230 | 244 | 175 | 130 | 160 | 156 | 233 | 228 | 211 | 2,422 |
| Mean daily sunshine hours | 6.6 | 7.6 | 7.9 | 7.1 | 7.7 | 5.9 | 3.9 | 4.5 | 5.4 | 6.3 | 7.9 | 6.2 | 6.4 |
Source 1: World Meteorological Organization
Source 2: Department of Hydrology and Meteorology, Deutscher Wetterdienst (sun 1961–1990, daily sun 1979-1988)

=== Air quality ===
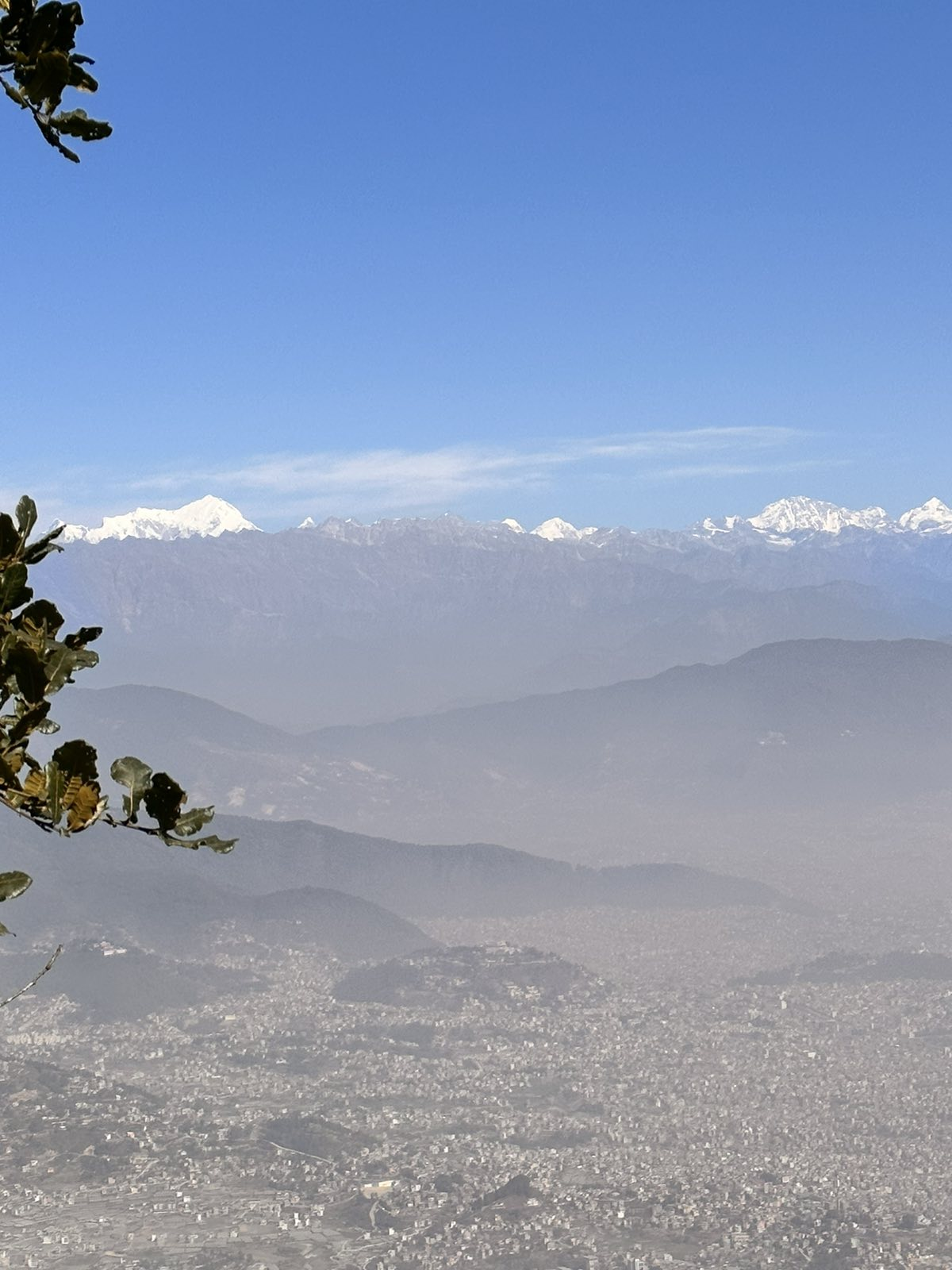
View of pollution in the Kathmandu Valley and mountain range as seen from Champa Devi

Air pollution is a major issue in the Kathmandu Valley. According to the 2016 World Health Organization's Ambient Air Pollution Database, the annual average PM2.5 (particulate matter) concentration in 2013 was 49 μg/m^{3}, which is 4.9 times higher than recommended by the World Health Organization.

Starting in early 2017, the Government of Nepal and the Embassy of the United States in Kathmandu have monitored and publicly share real-time air quality data. In Nepal and Kathmandu, the annual premature deaths due to air pollution reached 37,399 and 9,943 respectively, according to a Republica news report published on 23 November 2019. This indicates, around a quarter of the total deaths due to air pollution in Nepal are in Kathmandu.

== Demographics ==
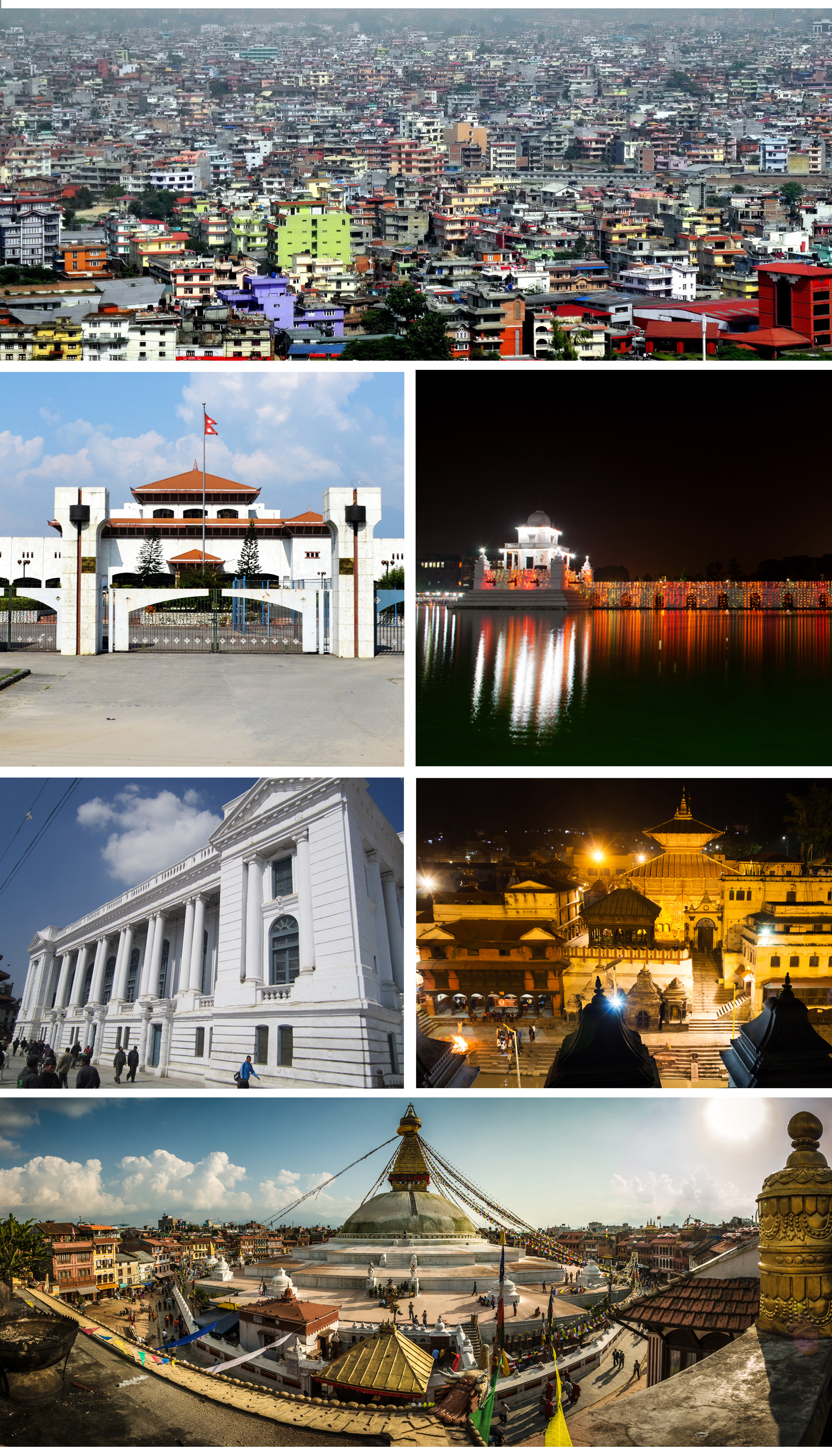
Kathmandu Skyline

Kathmandu's urban cosmopolitan character has made it the most populous city in Nepal. According to the National Population Census of 2011, the total population of Kathmandu city was 975,543 in 254,292 households with an annual growth rate of 6.12% with respect to the population figure of 2001. 70% of the total population residing in Kathmandu are aged between 15 and 59.

In one decade, the population increased from 427,045 in 1991 to 671,805 in 2001. The population was projected to reach 915,071 in 2011 and 1,319,597 by 2021. To keep up this population growth, the KMC-controlled area of 5,076.6 hectares (12,545 acres) expanded to 8,214 hectares (20,300 acres) in 2001. With this new area, the population density which was 85 in 1991 remained 85 in 2001; it is likely to jump to 111 in 2011 and 161 in 2021.

=== Languages ===
Languages in Kathmandu
1. Nepali (62.0%)
2. Newari (19.0%)
3. Tamang (6.00%)
4. Maithili (3.00%)
5. Gurung (2.00%)
6. Magar (2.00%)
7. Others (6.00%)

As of the 2011 census, Nepali is the most common mother tongue in Kathmandu, with 62% of the population speaking it as their mother tongue. Newari is spoken by 19%, and the other languages spoken in the city include Tamang (6%), Maithili (3%), Bhojpuri (2%), Gurung (2%), Magar (2%) and Sherpa (1%) as their first language. English is also spoken by many.

=== Ethnic groups ===
Ethnic groups in Kathmandu
1. Newar (24.6%)
2. Hill Brahmin (21.6%)
3. Chhetri (18.7%)
4. Tamang (7.74%)
5. Magar (4.16%)
6. Others (23.2%)

The largest group is the native Newars, whose various sub-groups combine to make up 24.59% of the population. The Bahuns, also known as Hill-Brahmin or Khas Brahmin, representing 21.62% of the population. They are part of the broader Khas community, as are the Chhetri, the third largest group, who account for 18.66% of the population. Tamang community composites of 7.74% making them 4th largest group in Kathmandu metropolitan.

Broad Caste and Ethnicity category (2011 Census)
| Broad Ethnic Category | Sub Category | Linguistic Family | Population Percentage |
|---|---|---|---|
| Khas Aryan (Hill/Pahari Caste Groups) | Khas Brahmin, Chhetri, Kami, Thakuri, Damai Sarki, Sanyasi/Dasnami | Indo-Aryan | 46.3% |
| Newar (Kathmandu Valley Caste Groups) | Newari Brahmin, Shrestha, Tamrakar, Dangol, Maharjan, Rajkarnikar, etc. | Sino-Tibetan | 24.7% |
| Janajati (Hill Tribal Groups) | Magar, Tamang, Gurung, Sherpa, Rai, Limbu, etc. | Sino-Tibetan | 19.2% |
| Maithil (Terai Caste Groups) | Maithil Yadav, Maithil Brahmins, Chamar, Kushwaha, Musahar, Kurmi, Dhanuk, etc. | Indo-Aryan | 4.1% |
| Muslim (Note: Census of Nepal treat Muslims as an ethnic group) | – | Indo-Aryan | 1.8% |
| Marwadi, Rajbanshi | - | Indo-Aryan | 1.6% |
| Adibasi (Terai Indigenous Groups) | Tharu, Rajbanshi, Tajpuriya, Santhal etc. | Indo-Aryan And Sino-Tibetan | 1.5% |
| Others | – | Indo-Aryan and Sino-Tibetan | 1.5% |

=== Hinduism ===
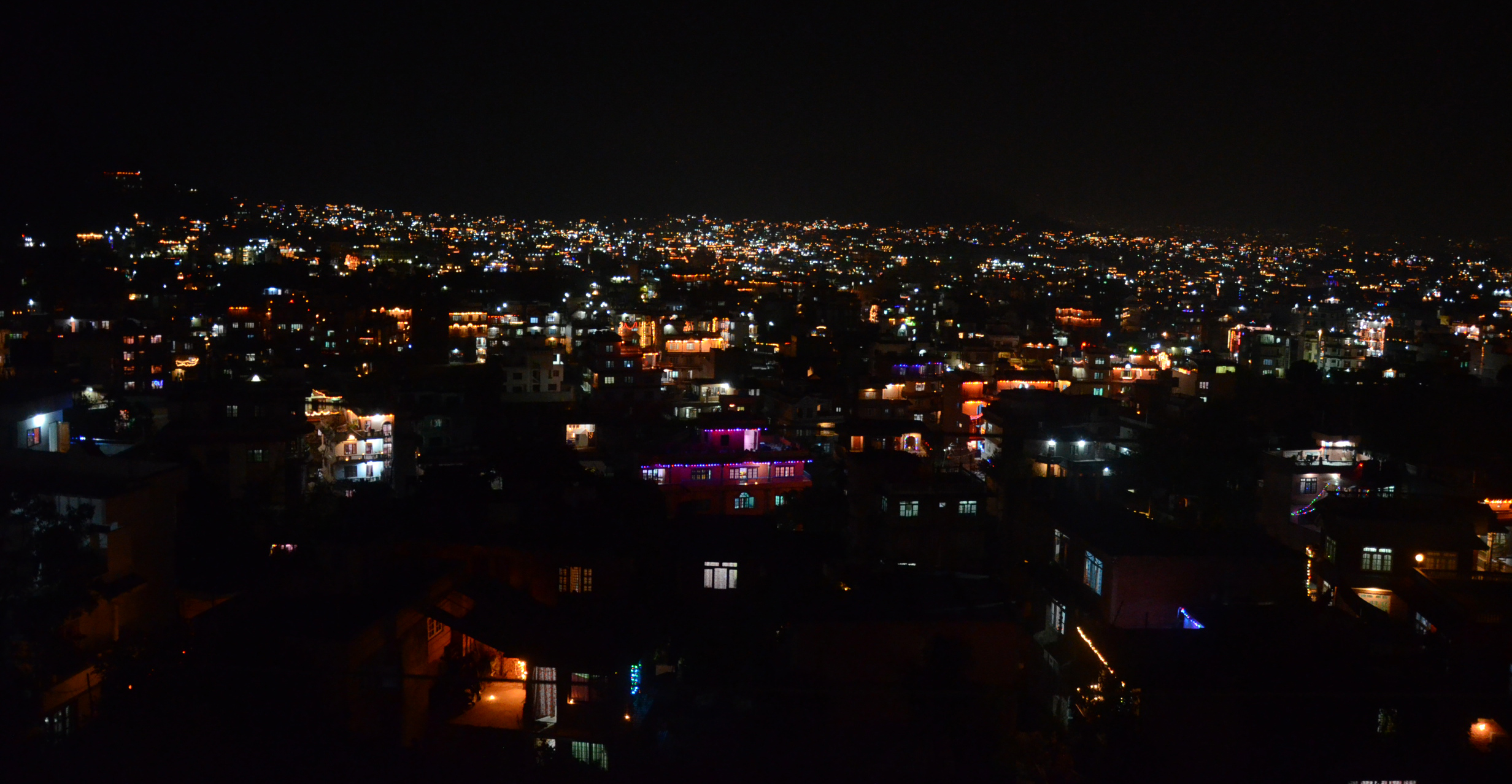
Kathmandu valley as seen from Halchowk during Deepawali, 2013

Hinduism is one of the indigenous beliefs of the city. Assumedly, together with the kingdom of Licchhavi (c. 400 to 750), Hinduism and the endogam social stratification of the caste was established in Kathmandu Valley. The Pashupatinath Temple, Changu Narayan Temple, and the Kasthamandap are of particular importance to Hindus. Other notable Hindu temples in Kathmandu and the surrounding valley include Bajrayogini Temple, Dakshinkali Temple, Guhyeshwari Temple, and the Shobha Bhagawati shrine.

The Bagmati River which flows through Kathmandu is considered a holy river both by Hindus and Buddhists, and many Hindu temples are on the banks of this river. The importance of the Bagmati also lies in the fact that Hindus are cremated on its banks, and Kirants are buried in the hills by its side. According to the Nepali Hindu tradition, the dead body must be dipped three times into the Bagmati before cremation. The chief mourner (usually the first son) who lights the funeral pyre must take a holy riverwater bath immediately after cremation. Many relatives who join the funeral procession also take bath in the Bagmati or sprinkle the holy water on their bodies at the end of cremation as the Bagmati is believed to purify people spiritually.

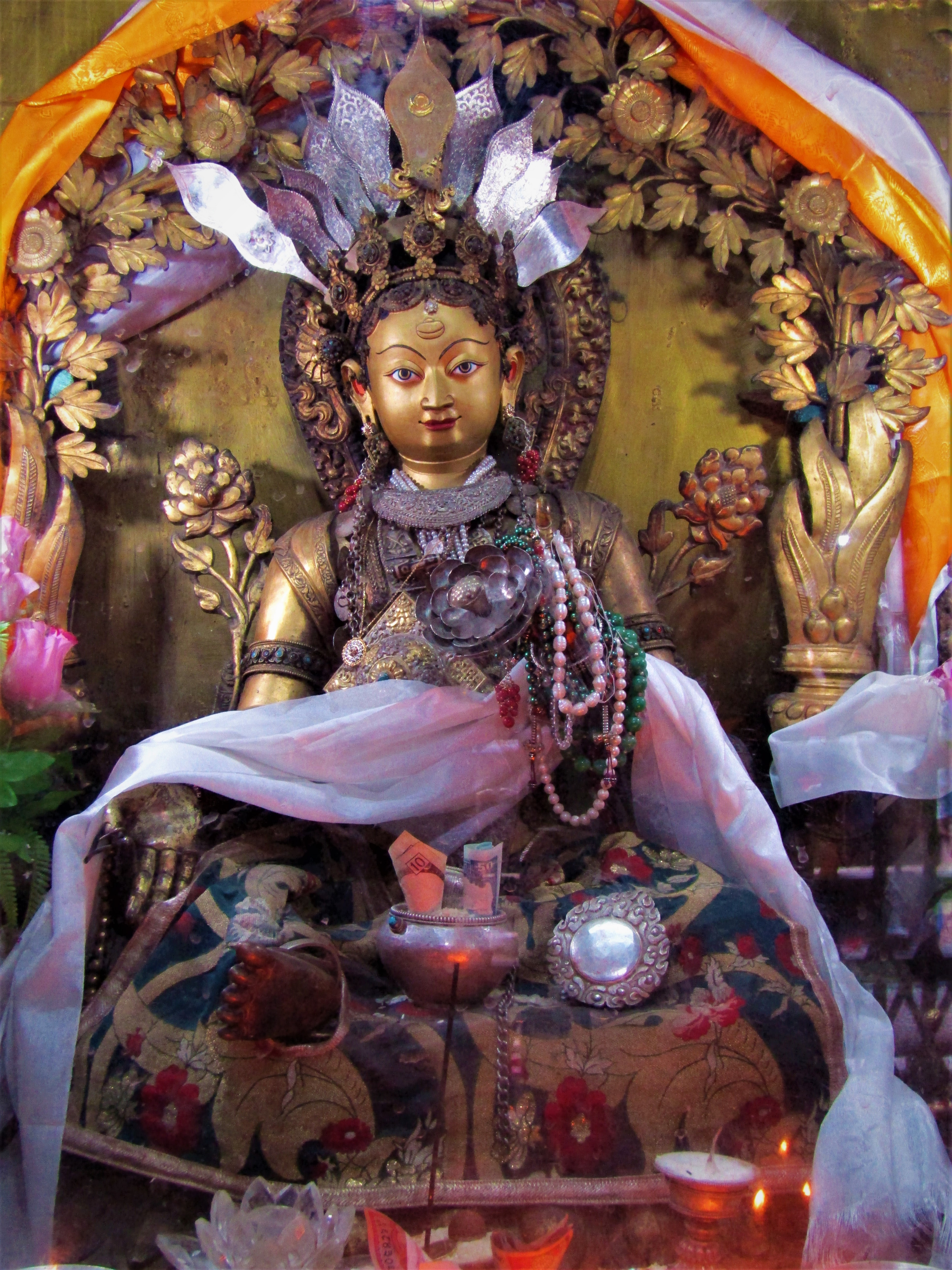
7th century Princess Bhrikuti from Kathmandu is credited with spreading Buddhism in Tibet and China, and is worshipped as the Buddhist Goddess Green Tara

=== Buddhism ===
Buddhism was brought into Kathmandu with the arrival of Buddhist monks during the time of Buddha (c. 563 – 483 BCE). They established a forest monastery in Sankhu. This monastery was renovated by Shakyas after they fled genocide from Virudhaka (r. 491–461 BCE).

During the Hindu Lichchavi era (c. 400 to 750), various monasteries and orders were created which successively led to the formation of Newar Buddhism, which is still practiced in the primary liturgical language of Hinduism, Sanskrit.

Legendary Princess Bhrikuti (7th-century) and artist Araniko (1245–1306 CE) from that tradition of Kathmandu valley played a significant role in spreading Buddhism in Tibet and China. There are over 108 traditional monasteries (Bahals and Baháʼís) in Kathmandu based on Newar Buddhism. Since the 1960s, the permanent Tibetan Buddhist population of Kathmandu has risen significantly so that there are now over fifty Tibetan Buddhist monasteries in the area. Also, with the modernization of Newar Buddhism, various Theravada Bihars have been established.

=== Other religions ===
Sikhism is practiced primarily in Gurudwara at Kupundole. An earlier temple of Sikhism is also present in Kathmandu which is now defunct.

Jainism is practiced by a small community. A Jain temple is present in Gyaneshwar, where Jains practice their faith.

According to the records of the Spiritual Assembly of the Baháʼís of Nepal, there are approximately 300 followers of the Baháʼí Faith in Kathmandu valley. They have a national office in Shantinagar, Baneshwor. The Baháʼís also have classes for children at the National Centre and other localities in Kathmandu.

In Kathmandu alone there are about 170 Christian churches. Christian missionary hospitals, welfare organizations, and schools are also operating. Nepali citizens who served as soldiers in Indian and British armies, who had converted to Christianity while in service, on return to Nepal continue to practice their religion. They have contributed to the spread of Christianity and the building of churches in Nepal and in Kathmandu, in particular.

== Economy ==
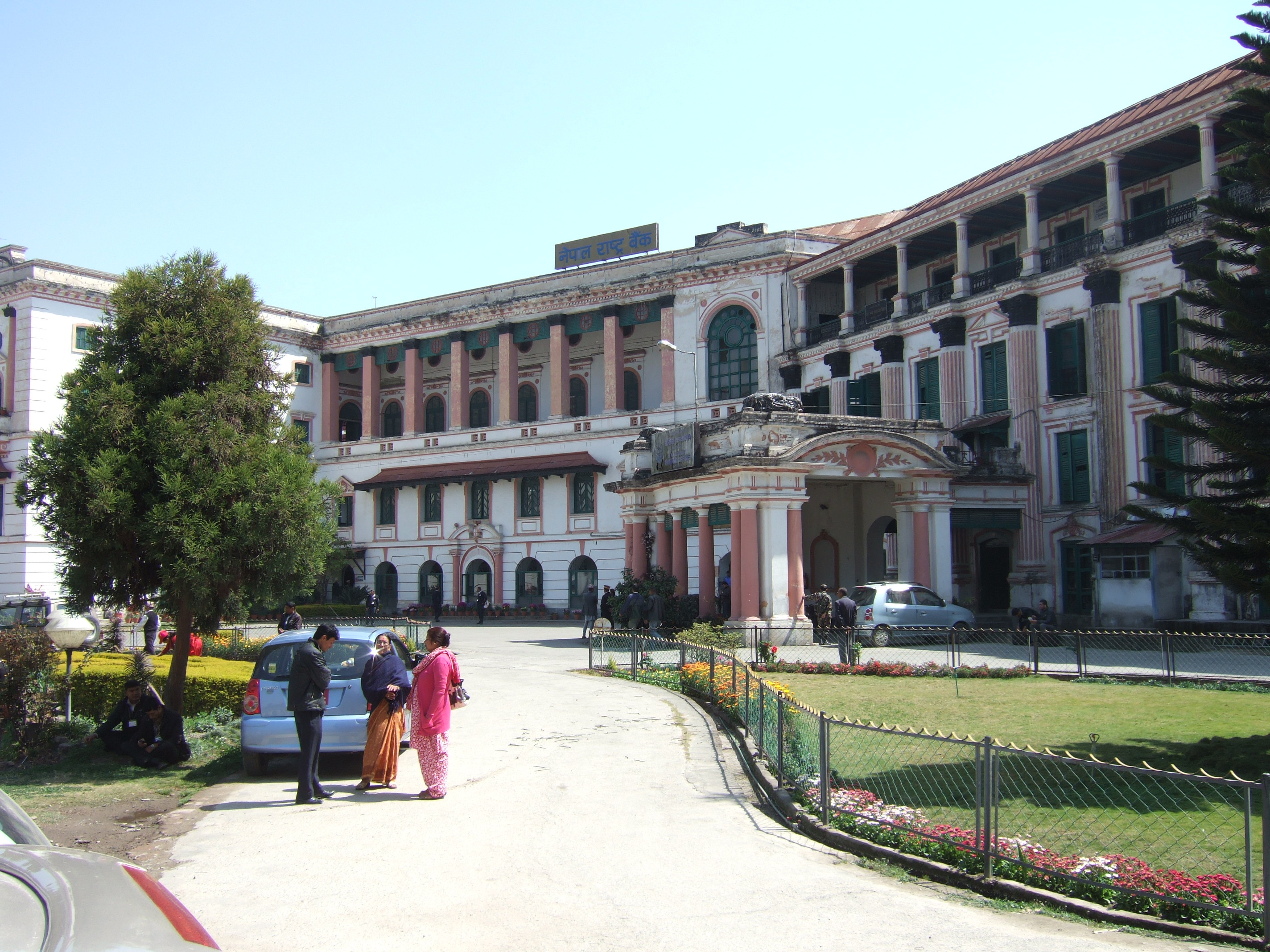
Central Bank of Nepal

The location and terrain of Kathmandu have played a significant role in the development of a stable economy which spans millennia. The city is in an ancient lake basin, with fertile soil and flat terrain. This geography helped form a society based on agriculture. This, combined with its location between India and China, helped establish Kathmandu as an important trading centre over the centuries. Kathmandu's trade is an ancient profession that flourished along an offshoot of the Silk Road which linked India and Tibet. From centuries past, Lhasa Newar merchants of Kathmandu have conducted trade across the Himalaya and contributed to spreading art styles and Buddhism across Central Asia. Other traditional occupations are farming, metal casting, woodcarving, painting, weaving, and pottery.

Kathmandu is the most important industrial and commercial centre in Nepal. The Nepal Stock Exchange, the head office of the national bank, the chamber of commerce, as well as head offices of national and international banks, telecommunication companies, the electricity authority, and various other national and international organizations are in Kathmandu. The major economic hubs are the New Road, Durbar Marg, Ason and Putalisadak.

The economic output of the metropolitan area of around Rs. 550 billion approximately per year alone is worth more than one third of national GDP (nominal), while the per capita income of $2200 is approximately three times the national average. Kathmandu exports handicrafts, artworks, garments, carpets, pashmina, paper; trade accounts for 21% of its revenues. Manufacturing is also important and accounts for 19% of the revenue that Kathmandu generates. Garments and woolen carpets are the most notable manufactured products. Other economic sectors in Kathmandu include agriculture (9%), education (6%), transport (6%), and hotels and restaurants (5%). Kathmandu is famous for lokta paper and pashmina shawls.

=== Tourism ===
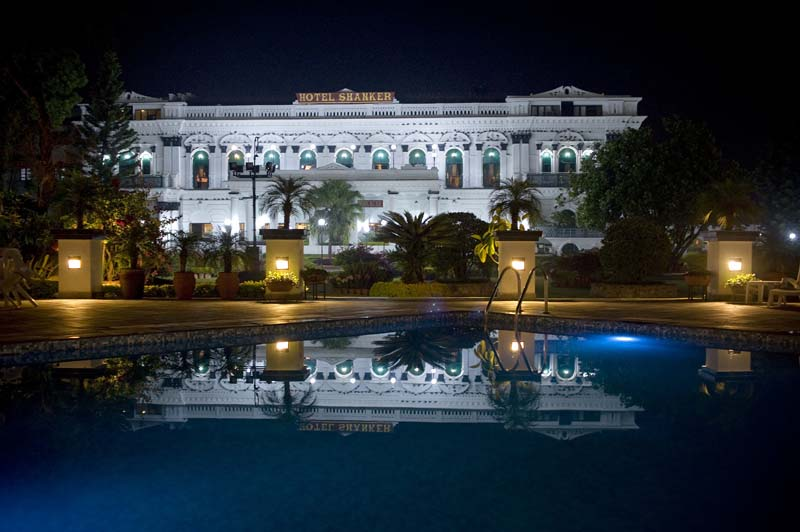
Hotel Shanker is one of the city's popular heritage hotels

Tourism in Nepal is considered an important industry. In 1956, air transportation was established and the construction of Tribhuvan Highway, between Kathmandu and Raxaul, was started. Separate organizations were created in Kathmandu to promote the tourism industry, including the Tourism Development Board, the Department of Tourism, and the Civil Aviation Department. Furthermore, Nepal became a member of several international tourist associations. Establishing diplomatic relations with other nations further accentuated this activity. The hotel industry, travel agencies, the training of tourist guides, and targeted publicity campaigns are the chief reasons for the significant growth of this industry in Nepal and in Kathmandu in particular.

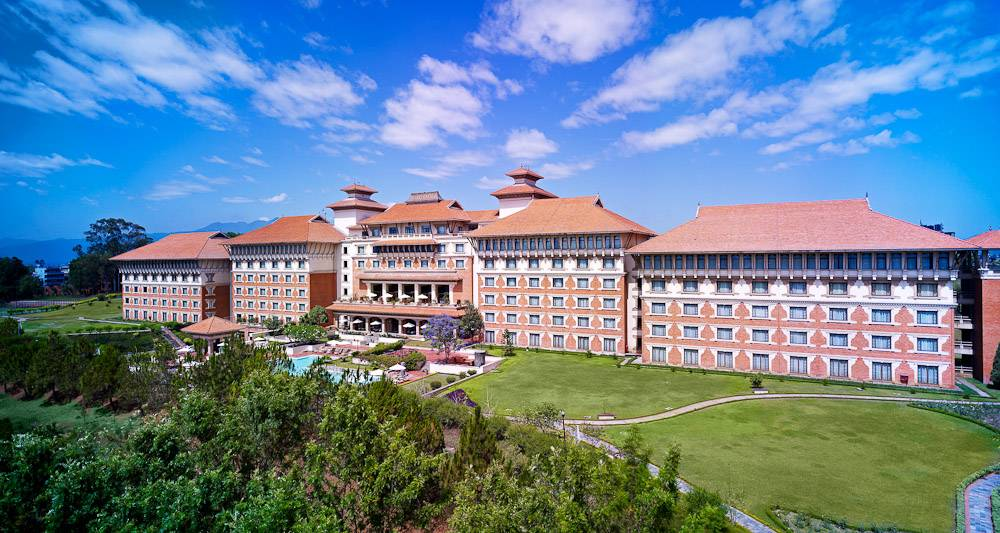
Hyatt Regency Kathmandu

Tourism is a major source of income for most of the people in the city, with several hundred thousand visitors annually. Hindu and Buddhist pilgrims from all over the world visit Kathmandu's religious sites such as Pashupatinath Temple, Swayambhunath, Boudhanath, Kailashnath Mahadev Statue , Changu Narayan Temple, and Budhanilkantha Temple. From a mere 6,179 tourists in 1961/62, the number increased to 491,504 in 1999/2000. In economic terms, the foreign exchange registered 3.8 percent of the GDP in 1995/96 but then started declining. Following the end of Nepalese Civil War, there was a significant rise in the number of tourist arrivals, with 509,956 tourists recorded in 2009. Since then, tourism has improved as the country transitioned into a republic. The high level of tourism is attributed to the natural grandeur of the Himalayas and the cultural heritage of the country which is continuously preserved and restored at great cost.

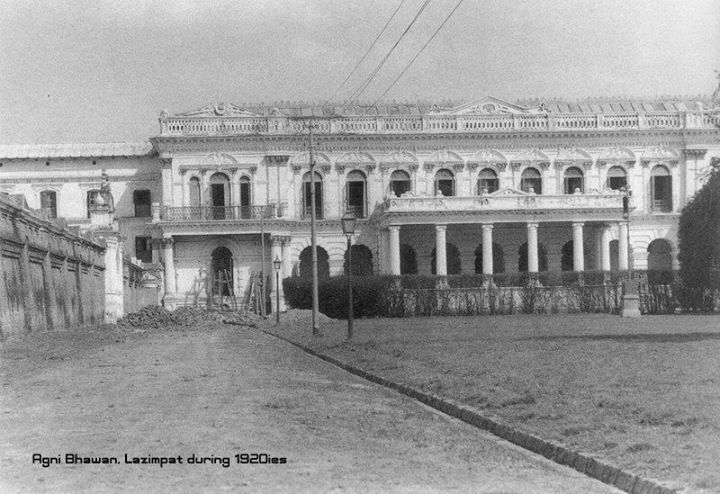
Official photo of Agni Bhawan from the 1920s, now part of Hotel Shanker Kathmandu

The neighbourhood of Thamel is Kathmandu's primary go-to place for tourists and is widely regarded as the center of Kathmandu's nightlife, packed with guest houses, restaurants, shops, and bookstores, catering to tourists. Another neighbourhood of growing popularity is Jhamel, a name for Jhamsikhel that was coined to rhyme with Thamel. Jhochhen Tol, also known as Freak Street remains a traveler haunt. This original meeting place for international guests in Kathmandu became known in the 1960s and 1970s through folklore told by hippies in Europe and North America.

With the opening of the tourist industry after the change in the political scenario of Nepal in 1950, the hotel industry drastically improved. Now Kathmandu boasts several luxury hotels with some including casinos. Ason is a bazaar and ceremonial square on the old trade route to Tibet.

== Government and public services ==
=== Civic administration ===
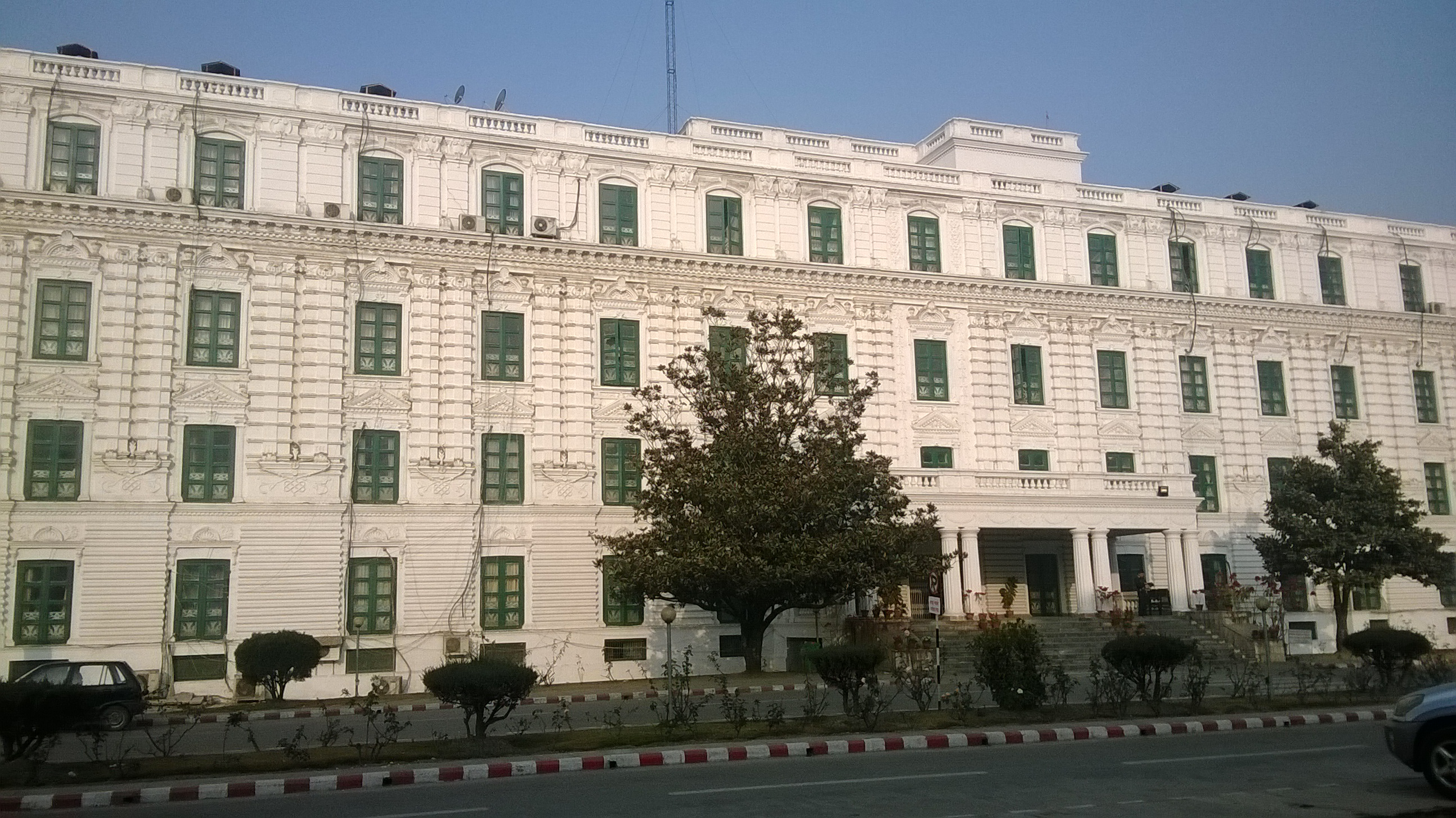
Office of the Prime Minister of Nepal in Singha Durbar, Kathmandu

Kathmandu Municipal Corporation (KMC) is the chief nodal agency for the administration of Kathmandu. The Municipality of Kathmandu was upgraded to a metropolitan city in 1995.

Metropolitan Kathmandu is divided into five sectors: the Central Sector, the East Sector, the North Sector, the City Core and the West Sector. For civic administration, the city is further divided into 32 administrative wards. The Council administers the Metropolitan area of Kathmandu city through its 177 elected representatives and 20 nominated members. It holds biannual meetings to review, process and approve the annual budget and make major policy decisions. The ward's profile documents for the 32 wards prepared by the Kathmandu Metropolitan Council is detailed and provides information for each ward on population, the structure and condition of houses, the type of roads, educational, health and financial institutions, entertainment facilities, parking space, security provisions, etc. It also includes lists of development projects completed, on-going and planned, along with informative data about the cultural heritage, festivals, historical sites and the local inhabitants. Ward 16 is the largest, with an area of 437.4 ha; ward 26 is the smallest, with an area of 4 ha.

Kathmandu is the headquarters of the surrounding Kathmandu District.

=== Law and order ===
The Metropolitan Police is the main law enforcement agency in the city. It is headed by a commissioner of police. The Metropolitan Police is a division of the Nepal Police, and the administrative control lies with the Ministry of Home Affairs.

=== Fire service ===
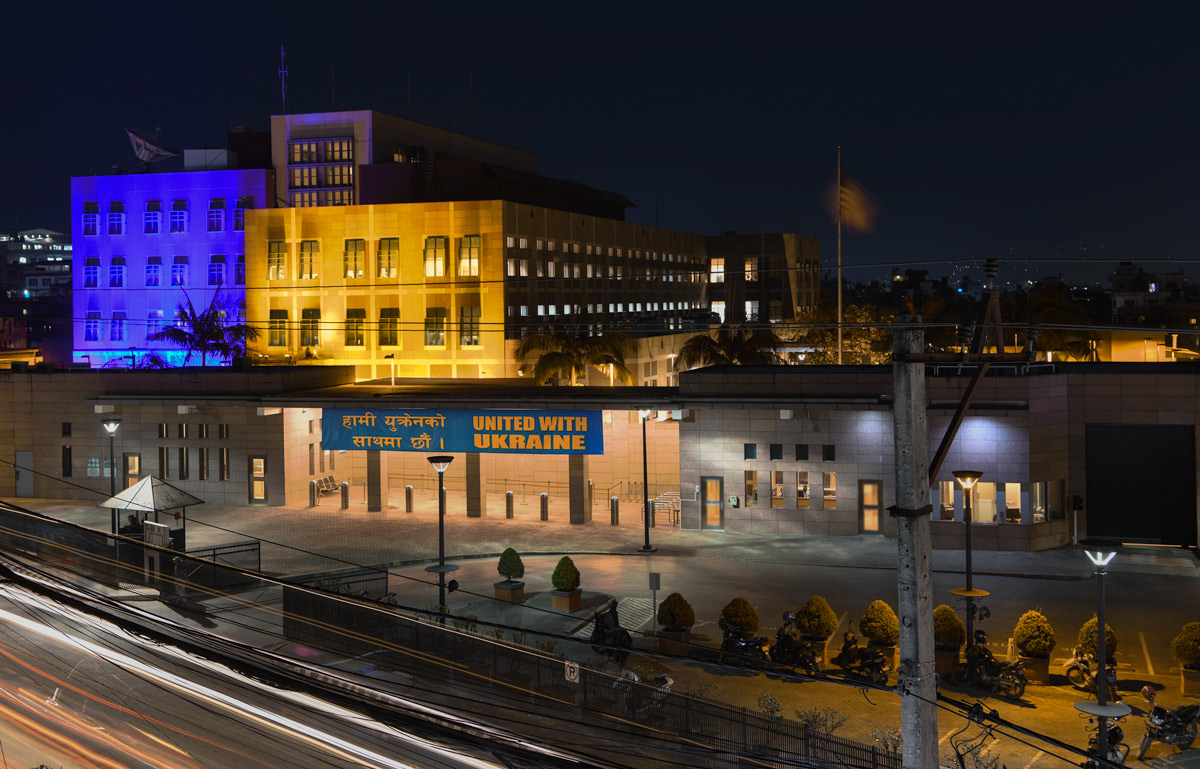
Embassy of the United States of America. Kathmandu hosts 28 diplomatic missions

The fire service, known as the Barun Yantra Karyalaya (Nepali: वारुण यन्त्र कार्यालय), opened its first station in Kathmandu in 1937 with a single vehicle. An iron tower was erected to monitor the city and watch for a fire. As a precautionary measure, firemen were sent to the areas which were designated as accident-prone areas. In 1944, the fire service was extended to the neighbouring cities of Lalitpur and Bhaktapur. In 1966, a fire service was established in Kathmandu central airport. In 1975, a West German government donation added seven fire engines to Kathmandu's fire service. The fire service in the city is also overlooked by an international non-governmental organization, the Firefighters Volunteer Association of Nepal (FAN), which was established in 2000 with the purpose of raising public awareness about fire and improving safety.

=== Electricity and water supply ===
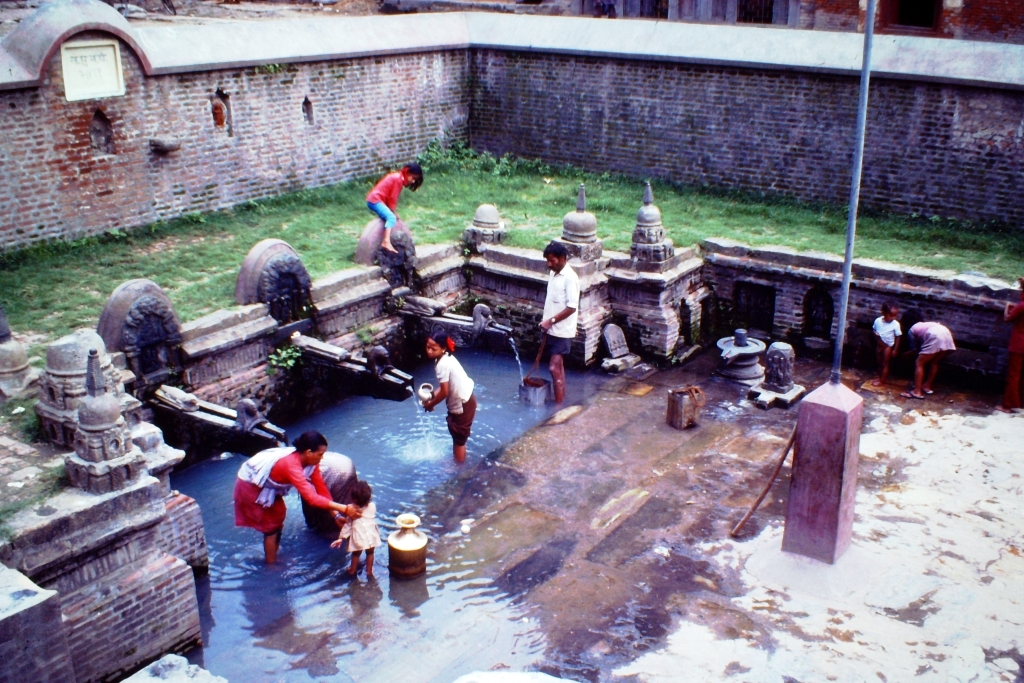
A 1979 photograph of public baths in Kathmandu

Electricity in Kathmandu is regulated and distributed by the Nepal Electricity Authority (NEA). Water supply and sanitation facilities are provided by the Kathmandu Upatyaka Khanepani Limited (KUKL). There is a severe shortage of water for household purposes such as drinking, bathing, cooking and washing and irrigation. People have been using bottled mineral water, water from tank trucks and from the ancient dhunge dharas (Nepali: ढुङ्गे धारा) for all the purposes related to water. The city water shortage should be solved by the completion of the much plagued Melamchi Water Supply Project by the end of 2019. Despite continued efforts by governmental bodies, Kathmandu is one of the most polluted cities in Nepal, largely due to overpopulation.

=== Waste management ===
Waste management may be through composting in municipal waste management units, and at houses with home composting units. Both systems are common and established in India and neighbouring countries.

== Architecture and cityscape ==
Kathmandu Valley World Heritage Site (WHS) Seven Monuments and Buildings

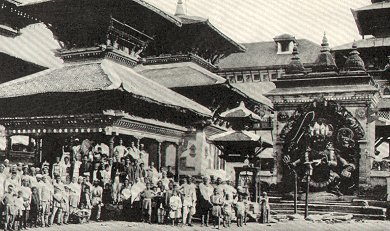
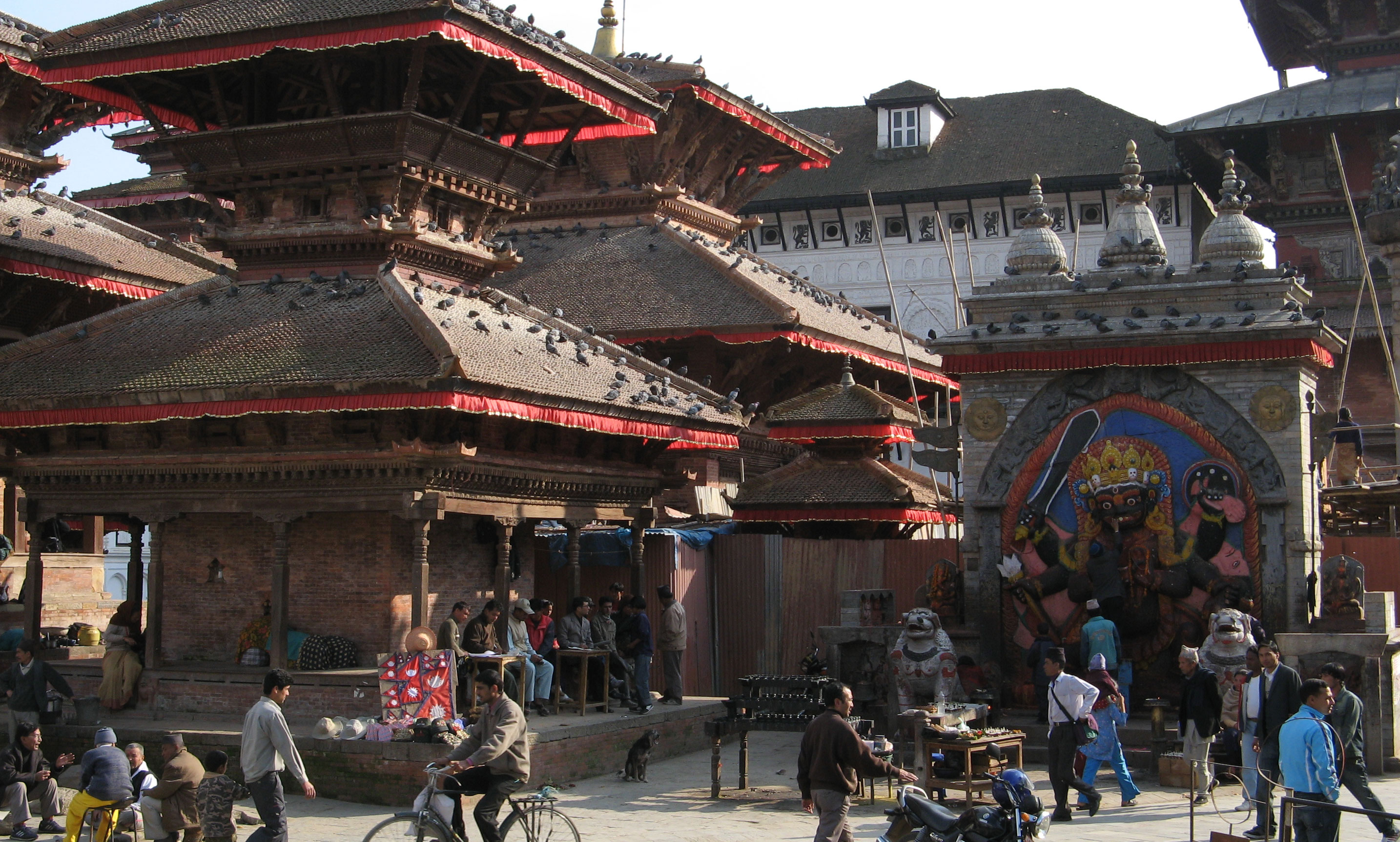
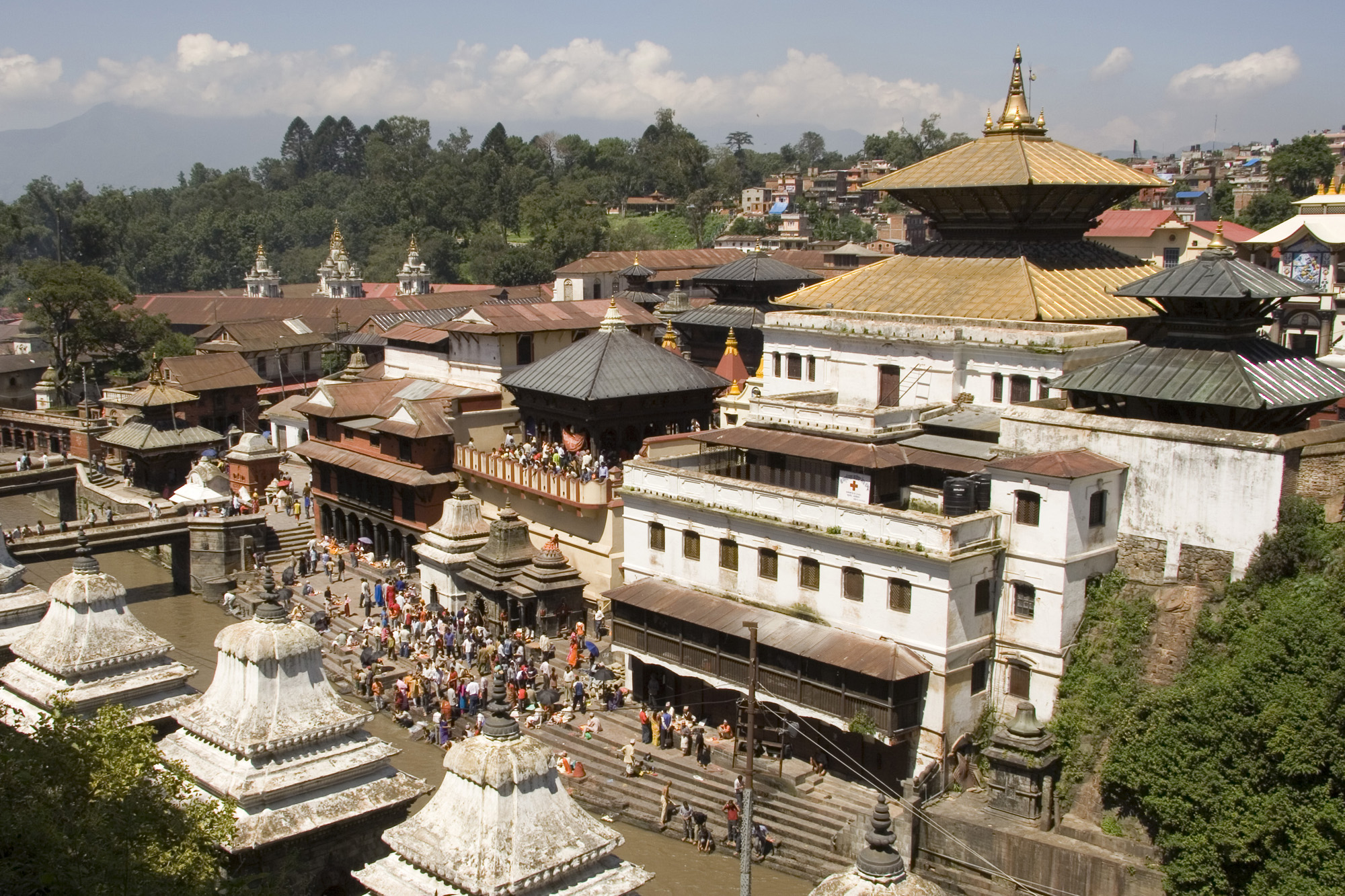
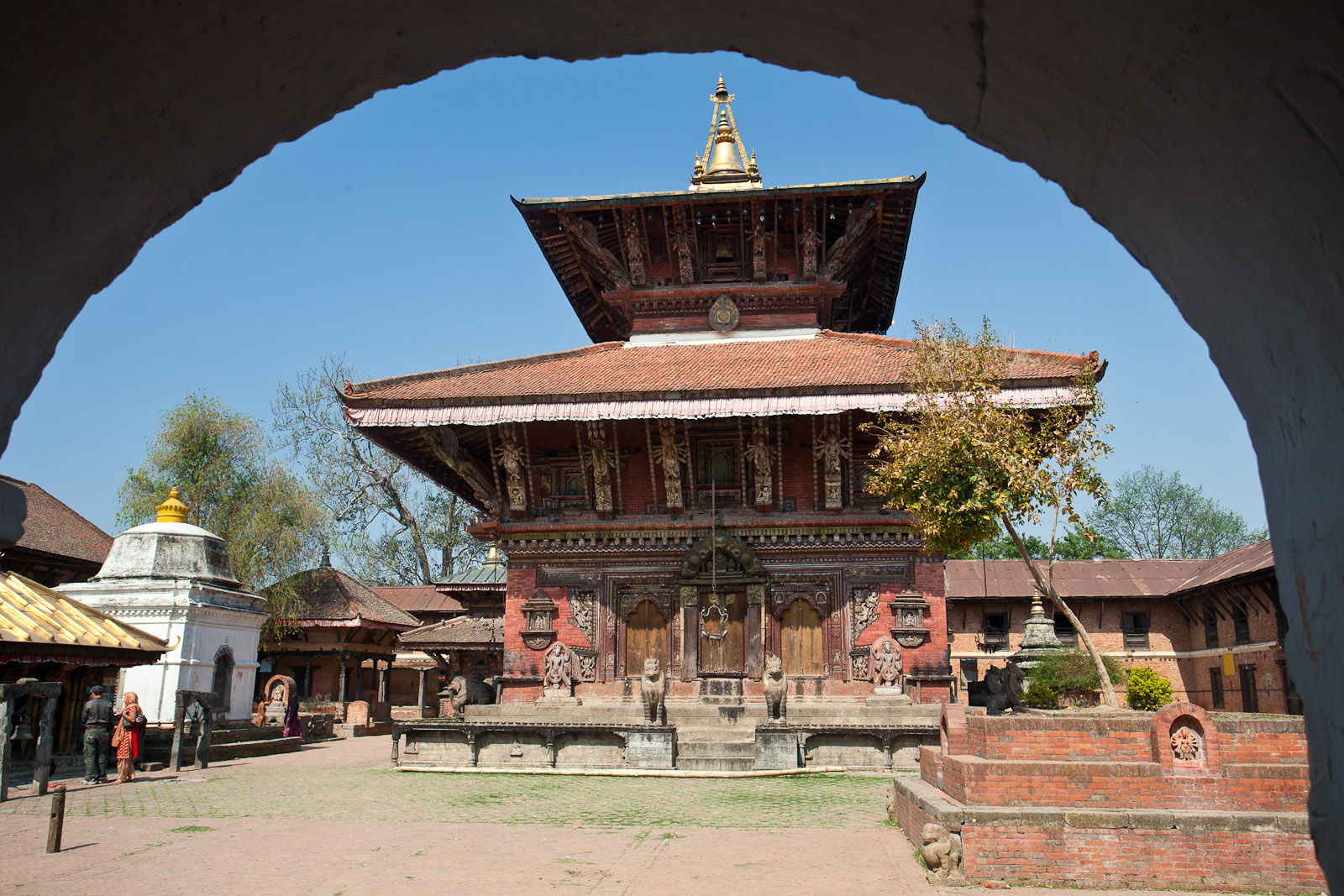
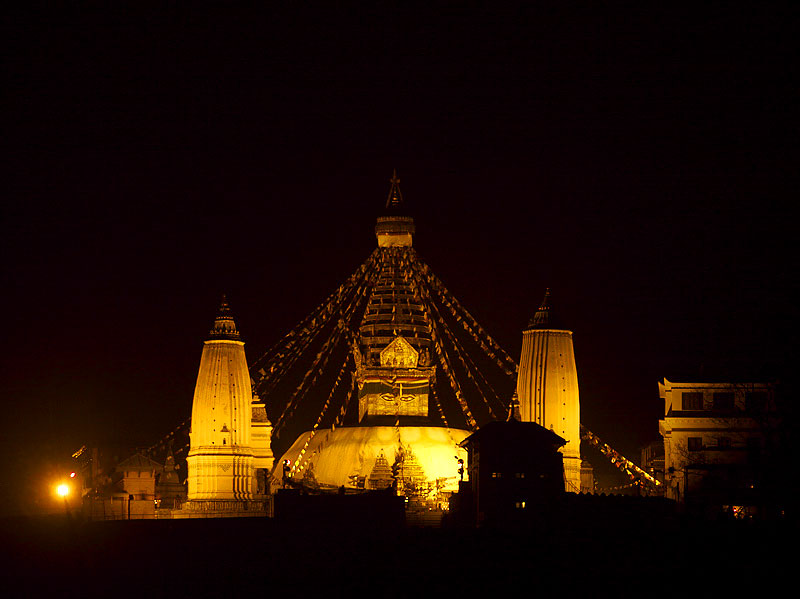
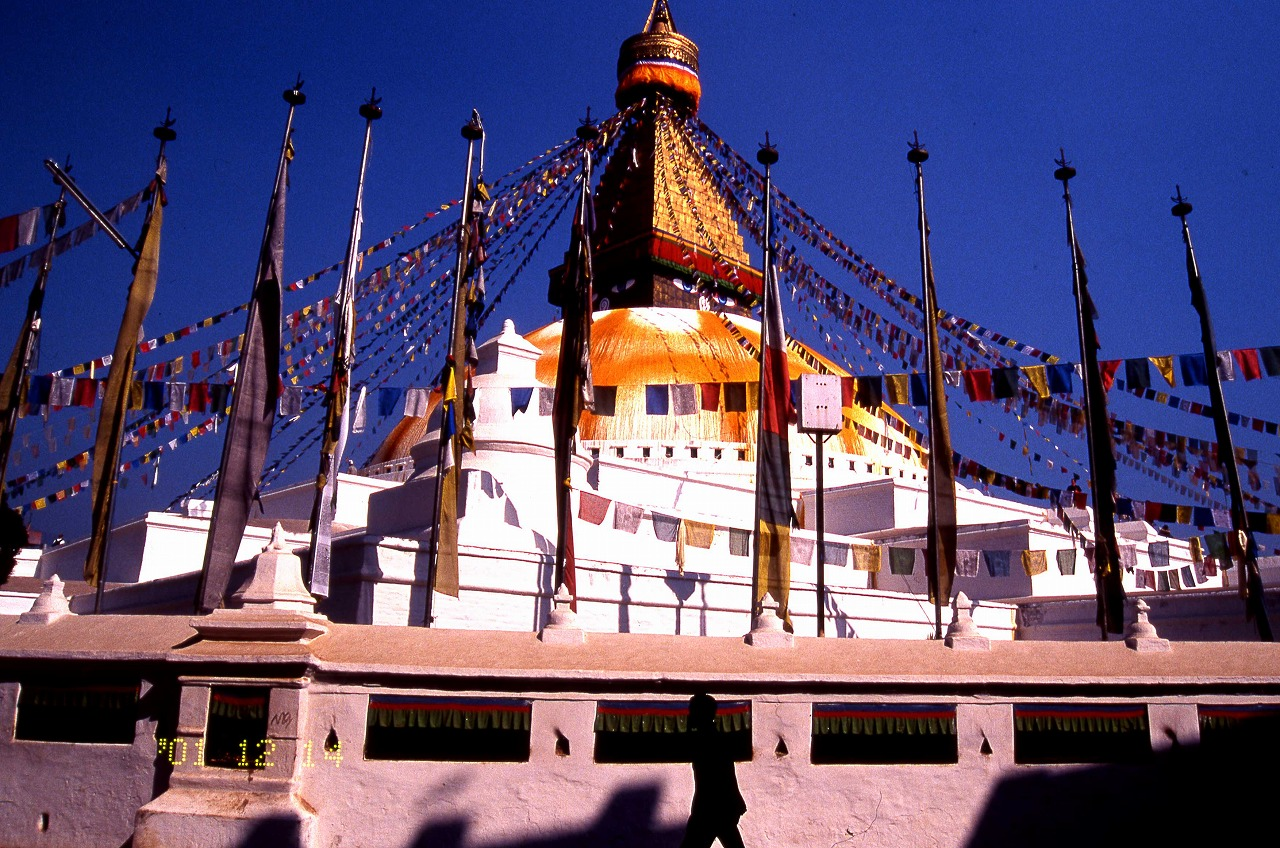
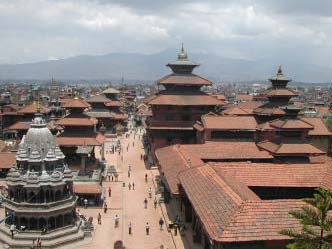
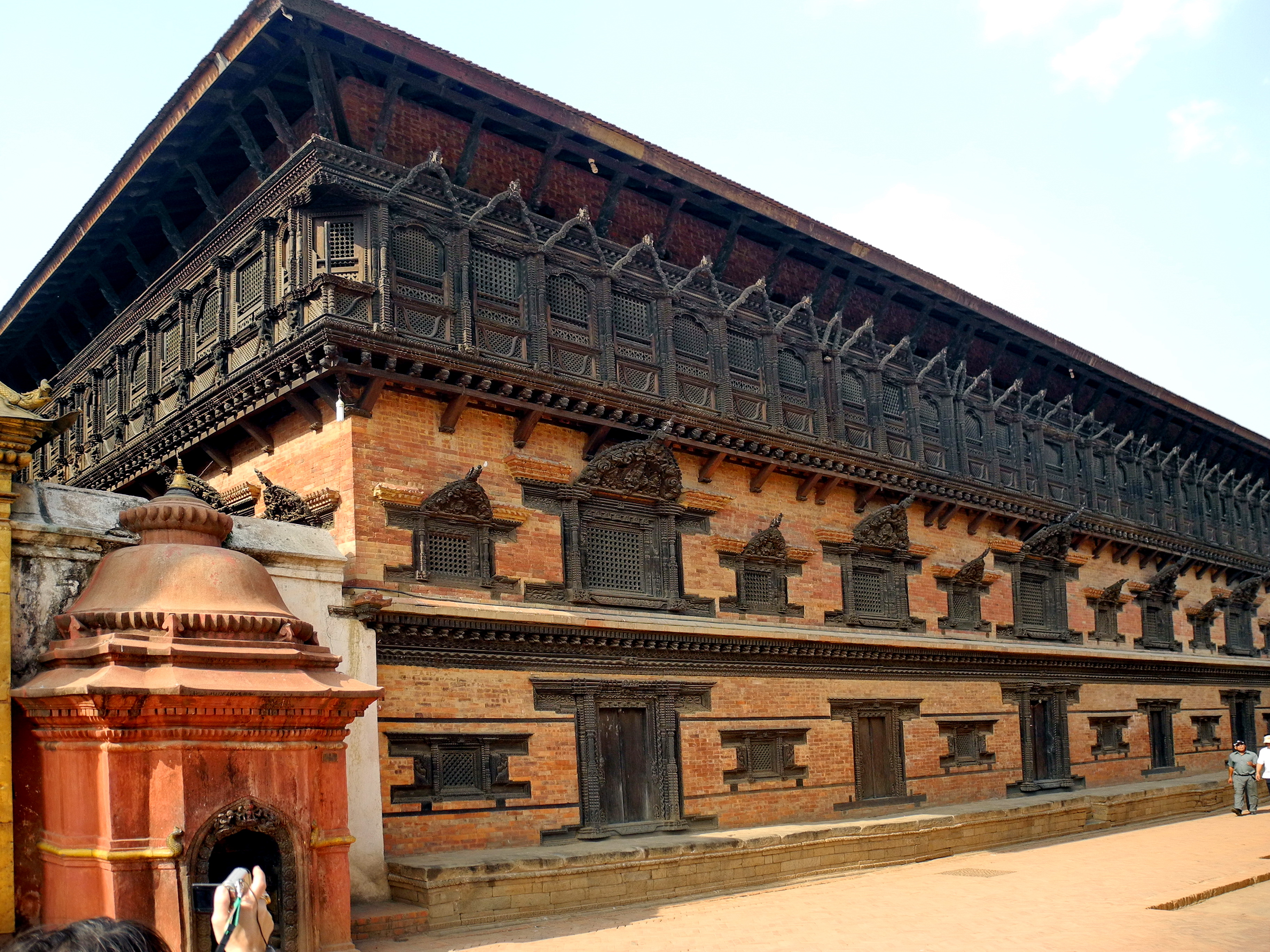

• Kathmandu Durbar Square in 1920 •
• Kathmandu Durbar Square in 2007 •
• Pashupatinath • Changunarayan •
• Swayambhunath • Boudhanath •
• Patan Durbar Square •
• Bhaktapur Durbar Square •

The ancient trade route between India and Tibet that passed through Kathmandu enabled a fusion of artistic and architectural traditions from other cultures to be amalgamated with local art and architecture. The monuments of Kathmandu City have been influenced over the centuries by Hindu and Buddhist religious practices. The architectural treasure of the Kathmandu valley has been categorized under the well-known seven groups of heritage monuments and buildings. In 2006 UNESCO declared these seven groups of monuments as a World Heritage Site (WHS). The seven monuments zones cover an area of 189 hectares (470 acres), with the buffer zone extending to 2,394 hectares (5,920 acres). The Seven Monument Zones inscribed originally in 1979 and with a minor modification in 2006 are the Durbar squares of Hanuman Dhoka, Patan and Bhaktapur, the Hindu temples of Pashupatinath and Changunarayan, the Buddhist stupas of Swayambhunath and Boudhanath.

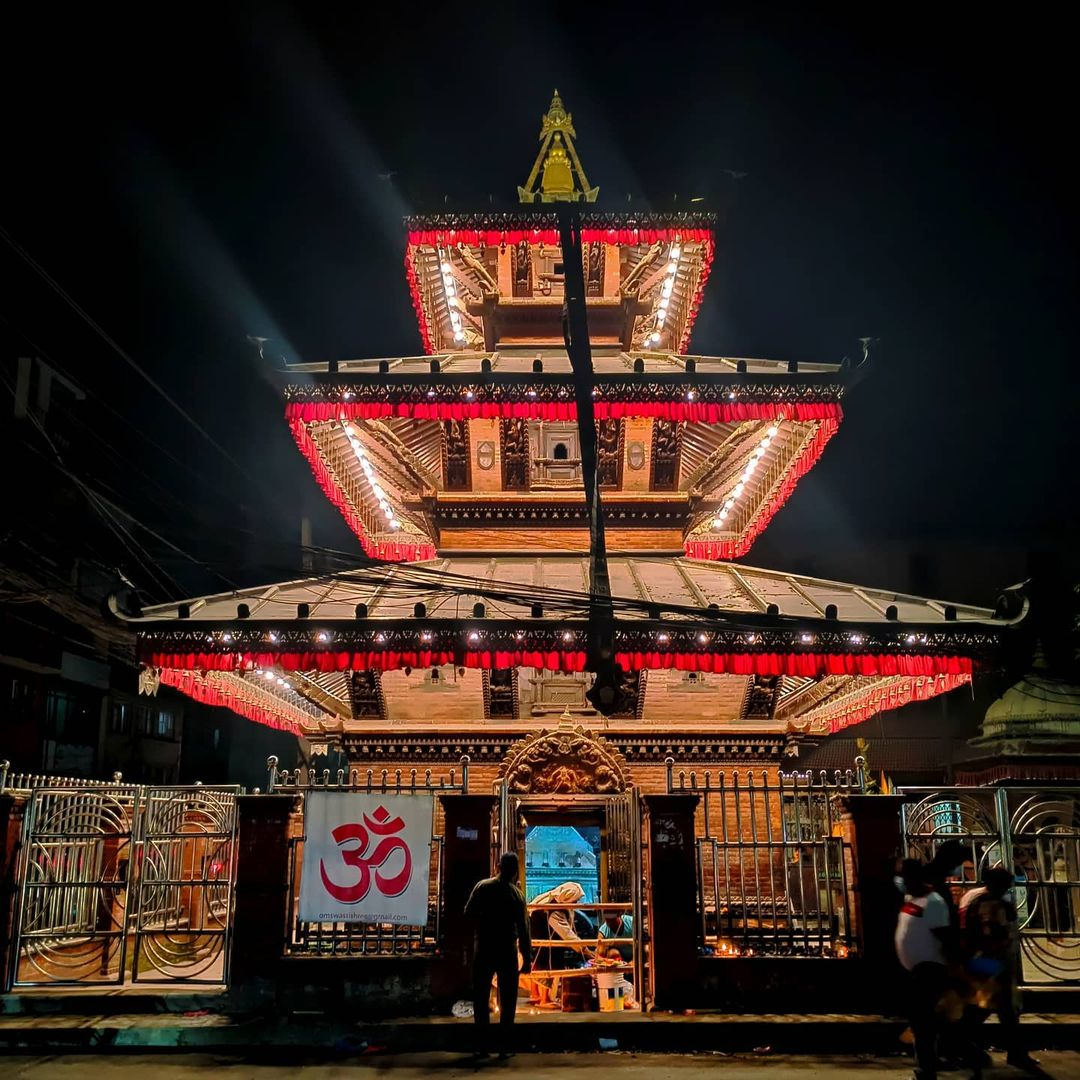
Naxal Bhagwati

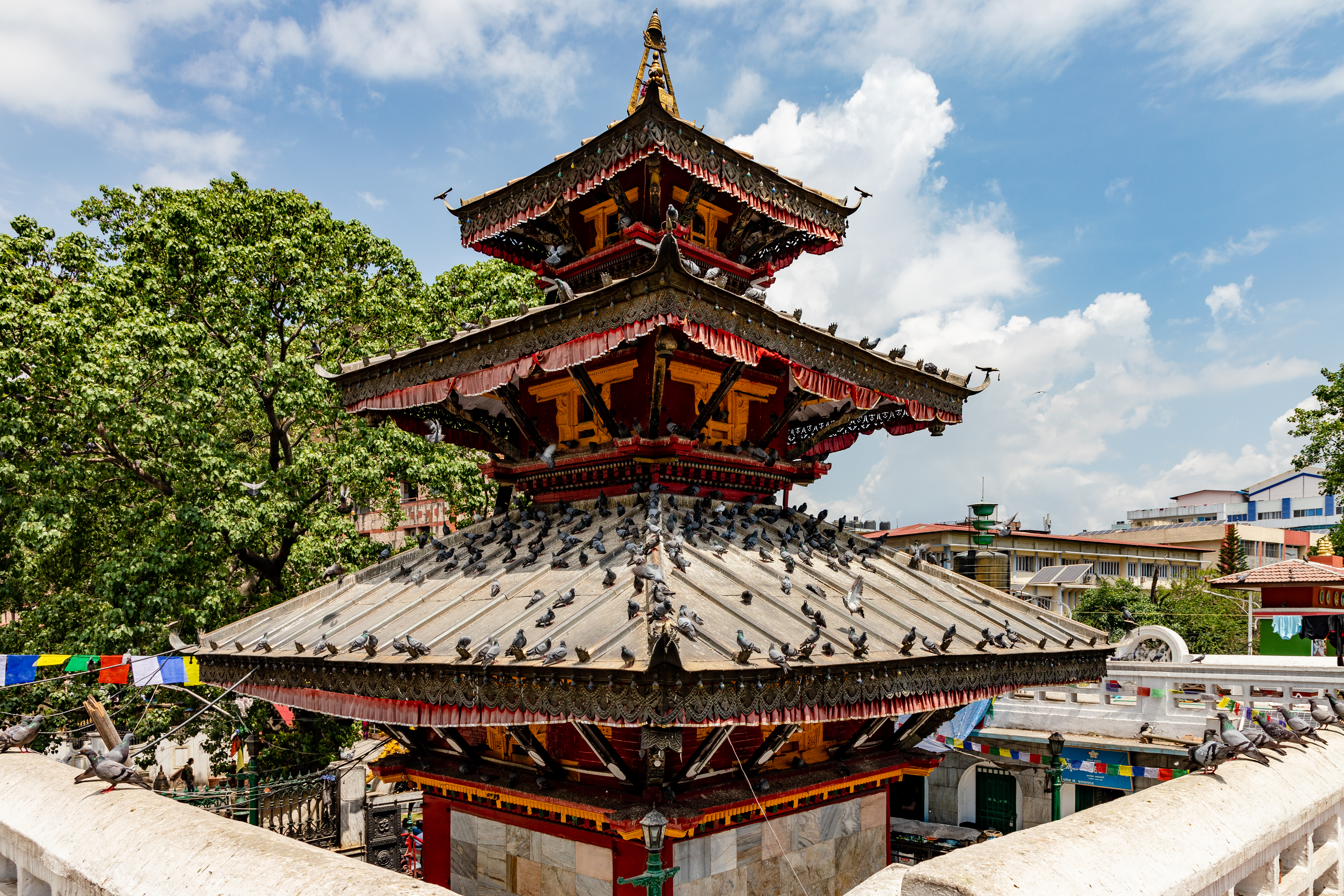
Mahakaal Temple

=== Durbar Squares ===
The literal meaning of Durbar Square is a "place of palaces". There are three preserved Durbar Squares in Kathmandu valley and one unpreserved in Kirtipur. The Durbar Square of Kathmandu is in the old city and has heritage buildings representing four kingdoms (Kantipur, Lalitpur, Bhaktapur, Kirtipur); the earliest being the Licchavi dynasty. The complex has 50 temples and is distributed in two quadrangles of the Durbar Square. The outer quadrangle has the Kasthamandap, Kumari Ghar, and Shiva-Parvati Temple; the inner quadrangle has the Hanuman Dhoka palace. The squares were severely damaged in the April 2015 earthquake.

Hanuman Dhoka is a complex of structures with the royal palace of the Malla kings and of the Shah dynasty. It is spread over five acres. The eastern wing (with ten courtyards) is the oldest part, dating to the mid-16th century. It was expanded by King Pratap Malla in the 17th century with many temples. The royal family lived in this palace until 1886 when they moved to Narayanhiti Palace. The stone inscription outside is in fifteen languages.

Kumari Ghar is a palace in the centre of the Kathmandu city, next to the Durbar square where a royal Kumari selected from several Kumaris resides. Kumari (or Kumari Devi), is the tradition of worshipping young pre-pubescent girls as manifestations of the divine female energy (or devi) in South Asian countries. In Nepal, the selection process is very rigorous. Previously, during the time of the monarchy, the queen and the priests used to appoint the proposed Kumari with delicate process of astrological examination and physical examination of 32 'gunas'. The china (Nepali: चिना), an ancient Hindu astrological report of the Kumari and the reigning king, has been said to be similar. The Kumari is believed to be a bodily incarnation of the goddess Taleju (the Nepali name for Durga) until she menstruates, after which it is believed that the goddess vacates her body. Serious illness or a major loss of blood from an injury also causes her to revert to common status. The current Kumari, Trishna Shakya, age three at the time of appointment, was installed in September 2017 succeeding Matina Shakya who was the first Kumari of Kathmandu after the end of the monarchy.

Kasthamandap is a three-storeyed temple enshrining an image of Gorakhnath. It was built in the 16th century in the pagoda style. The name of Kathmandu is a derivative of the word Kasthamandap. It was built under the reign of King Laxmi Narsingha Malla. Kasthamandap stands at the intersection of two ancient trade routes linking India and Tibet at Maru square. It was originally built as a rest house for travellers.

=== Pashupatinath temple ===
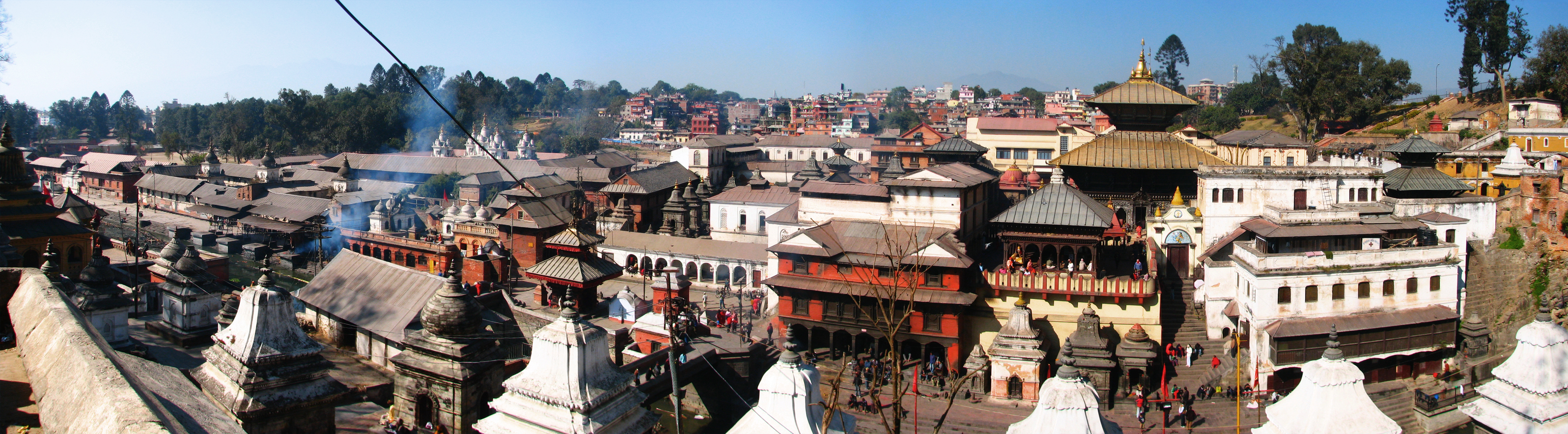
Panorama of the Pashupatinath Temple from the other bank of Bagmati river

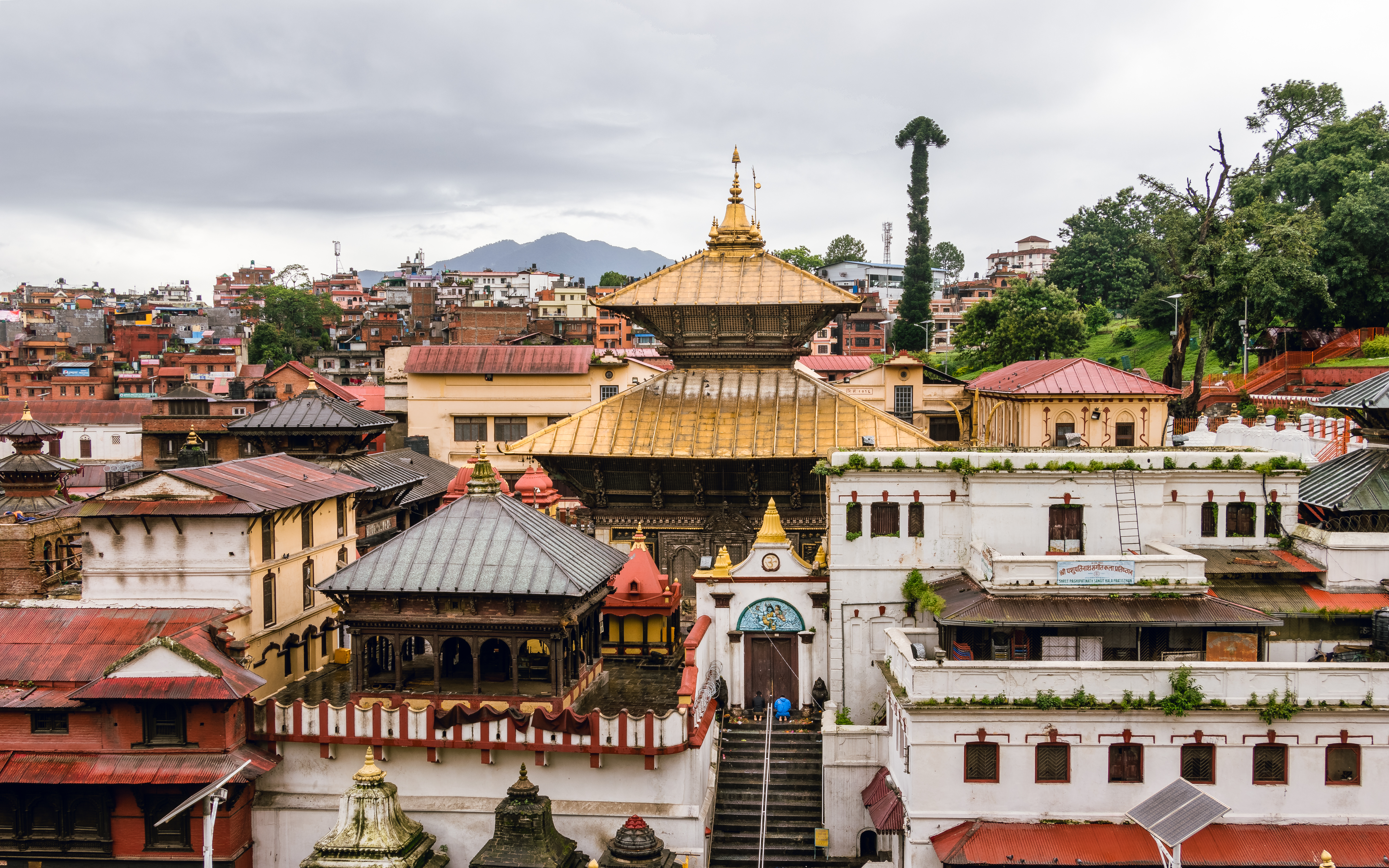
Pashupatinath temple dedicated to Shiva as the 'lord of all beings' is a UNESCO World Heritage site

The Pashupatinath Temple (Nepali: पशुपतिनाथ मन्दिर) is a famous 5th century Hindu temple dedicated to Shiva. Located on the banks of the Bagmati River, the Pashupatinath Temple is the oldest Hindu temple in Kathmandu. It served as the seat of national deity, Pashupatinath, until Nepal was secularized. However, a significant part of the temple was destroyed by Mughal invaders in the 14th century and little or nothing remains of the original 5th-century temple exterior. The temple as it stands today was built in the 19th century, although the image of the bull and the black four-headed image of Pashupati are at least 300 years old. The temple is a UNESCO World Heritage Site. Shivaratri, or the night of Shiva, is the most important festival that takes place here, attracting thousands of devotees and sadhus.

Believers in Pashupatinath (mainly Hindus) are allowed to enter the temple premises, but non-Hindu visitors are allowed to view the temple only from the across the Bagmati River. The priests who perform the services at this temple have been Brahmins from Karnataka in southern India since the time of Malla king Yaksha Malla. This tradition is believed to have been started at the request of Adi Shankara who sought to unify the states of Bhāratam, a region in south Asia believed to be ruled by a mythological king Bharata, by encouraging cultural exchange. This procedure is followed in other temples around India, which were sanctified by Adi Shankara.

The temple is built in the pagoda style of architecture, with cubic constructions and carved wooden rafters (tundal) on which they rest, and two-level roofs made of copper and gold.

=== Boudhanath ===
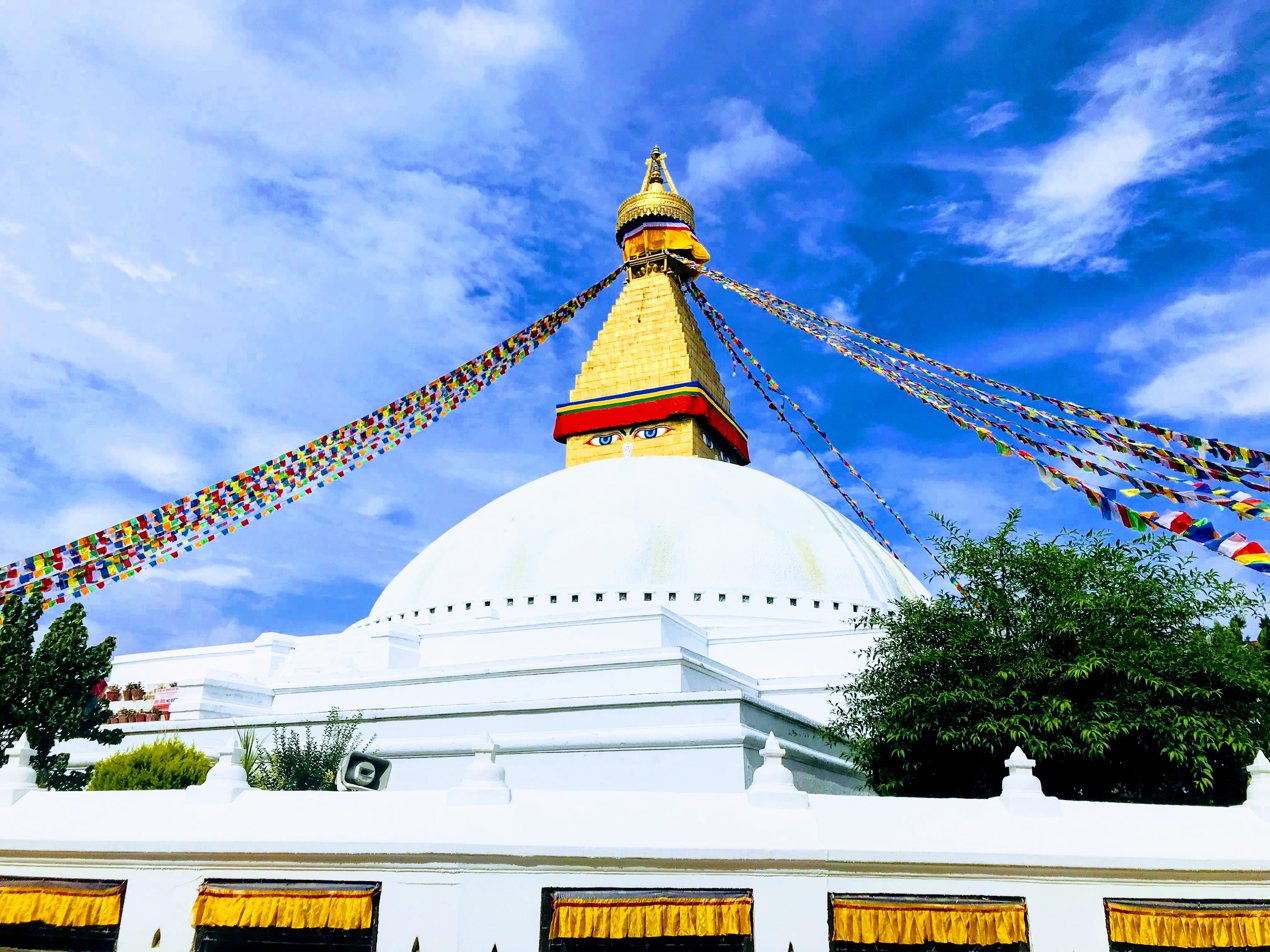
Boudhanath Stupa

Boudhanath (Nepali: बौद्ध स्तुप; also written as Bouddhanath, Bodhnath, Baudhanath or the Khāsa Chaitya), is one of the holiest Buddhist sites in Nepal, along with the Swayambhunath. It is a very popular tourist site. Boudhanath is known as Khāsti by Newars and as Bauddha or Bodhnāth by speakers of Nepali. About 11 km (7 mi) from the centre and northeastern outskirts of Kathmandu, the stupa's massive mandala makes it one of the largest spherical stupas in Nepal. Boudhanath became a UNESCO World Heritage Site in 1979.

The base of the stupa has 108 small depictions of the Dhyani Buddha Amitabha. It is surrounded with a brick wall with 147 niches, each with four or five prayer wheels engraved with the mantra, Om mani padme hum. At the northern entrance where visitors must pass is a shrine dedicated to Ajima, the goddess of smallpox. Every year the stupa attracts many Tibetan Buddhist pilgrims who perform full body prostrations in the inner lower enclosure, walk around the stupa with prayer wheels, chant, and pray. Thousands of prayer flags are hoisted up from the top of the stupa downwards and dot the perimeter of the complex. The influx of many Tibetan refugees from China has seen the construction of over 50 Tibetan gompas (monasteries) around Boudhanath.

Stupa at Swayambhu

=== Swayambhu ===
Swayambhunath (Nepali: स्वयम्भू स्तूप) is a Buddhist stupa atop a hillock at the northwestern part of the city. This is among the oldest religious sites in Nepal. Although the site is considered Buddhist, it is revered by both Buddhists and Hindus. The stupa consists of a dome at the base; above the dome, there is a cubic structure with the eyes of Buddha looking in all four directions. There are pentagonal toran above each of the four sides, with statues engraved on them. Behind and above the torana there are thirteen tiers. Above all the tiers, there is a small space above which lies a gajur.

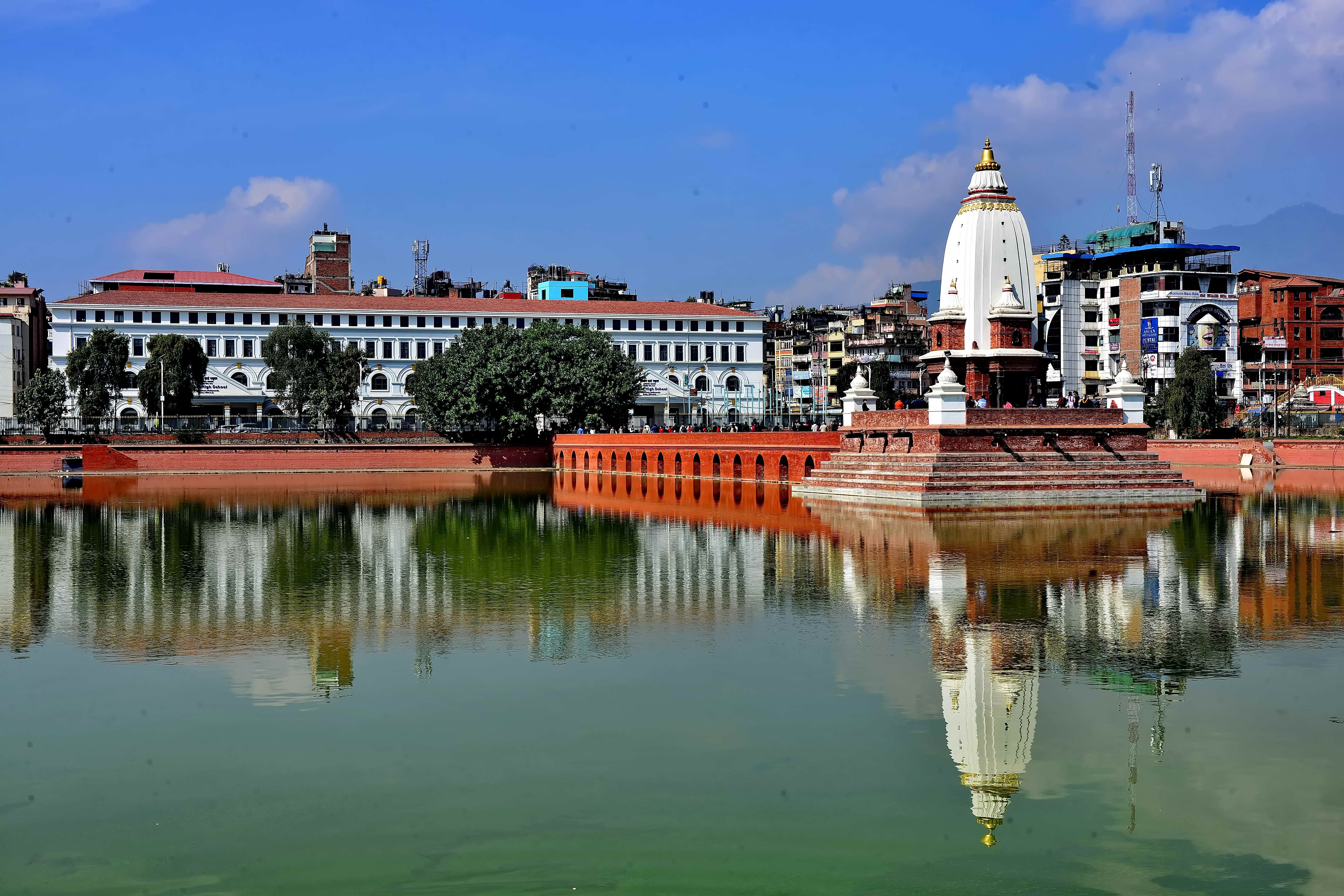
Rani Pokhari or Queen's Pond, a 17th-century monument in Kathmandu

=== Rani Pokhari ===
Ranipokhari (Nepali: रानी पोखरी, lit. 'Queen's Pond') is a historic artificial pond nestled in the heart of Kathmandu. It was built by king Pratap Malla in 1670 for his beloved queen after she lost her son and could not recover from her loss. A large stone statue of an elephant in the south signifies the image of Pratap Malla and his two sons. Balgopaleshwor Temple stands still inside the temple above the pond. Rani Pokhari is opened once a year during the final day of Tihar i.e. Bhai Tika and Chhath festival. The world's largest Chhath takes place every year in Ranipokhari. The pond is one of Kathmandu's most famous landmarks and is known for its religious and aesthetic significance. After sustaining damages from the 2015 earthquake, Ranipokhari went under development, which began in 2019 and the reconstruction was completed in October 2020.

== Education ==
The oldest modern school in Nepal, the Durbar High School, and the oldest college, the Tri-Chandra College, are both in Kathmandu.

Thapathali Campus the oldest engineering college in Nepal, is also located in Kathmandu. Kathmandu and its surrounding cities are home to many Nepali educational institutions. Each year, students from across Nepal travel to Kathmandu to pursue education at its various school and colleges.

=== Medical colleges ===
Institute of Medicine, the central college of Tribhuvan University is the first medical college of Nepal and is in Maharajgunj, Kathmandu. It was established in 1972 and started to impart medical education from 1978. Other major institutions include Patan Academy of Health Sciences, Kathmandu Medical College, Nepal Medical College, KIST Medical College, Nepal Army Institute of Health Sciences, National Academy of Medical Sciences (NAMS) and Kathmandu University School of Medical Sciences (KUSMS), are also in or around Kathmandu.

== Healthcare ==
Healthcare in Kathmandu is the most developed in Nepal, and the city and surrounding valley is home to some of the best hospitals and clinics in the country. Bir Hospital is the oldest, established in July 1889 by Bir Shamsher Jang Bahadur Rana. Notable hospitals include Bir Hospital, Nepal Medical College (Jorpati) and Teaching Hospital, Tribhuvan University Institute of Medicine (Teaching Hospital), Patan Hospital, Kathmandu Model Hospital, Scheer Memorial Hospital, Om Hospital, Norvic Hospital, Grande International Hospital, Nobel Hospital and many more.

The city is supported by specialist hospitals/clinics such as Shahid Shukraraj Tropical Hospital, Shahid Gangalal Foundation, Kathmandu Veterinary Hospital, Nepal Eye Hospital, Kanti Children's Hospital, Nepal International Clinic (Travel and Mountain Medicine Center), Neuro Center, Spinal Rehabilitation center and Bhaktapur Cancer Hospital. Most of the general hospitals are in the city center, although several clinics are elsewhere in Kathmandu district.

Tilganga Institute of Ophthalmology is an ophthalmology hospital in Kathmandu. It pioneered the production of low cost intraocular lenses (IOLs), which are used in cataract surgery. The team of Dr. Sanduk Ruit in Tilganga pioneered sutureless small-incision cataract surgery (SICS), a technique which has been used to treat 4 million of the world's 20 million people with cataract blindness.

== Transport ==
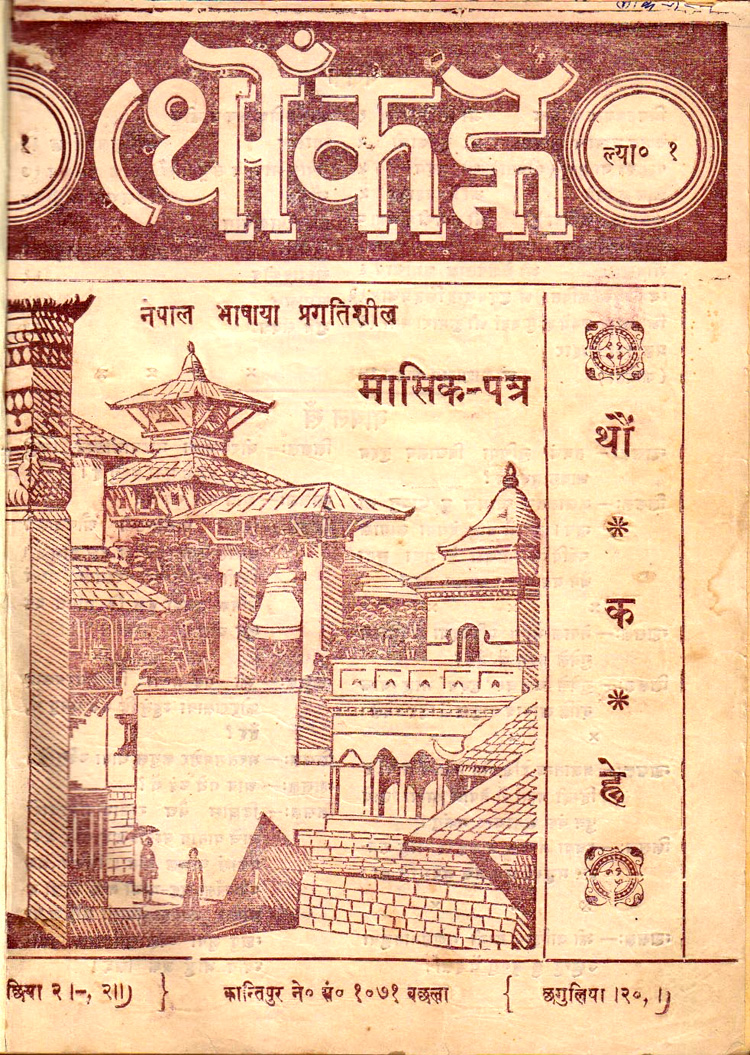
A Nepal Bhasa magazine cover in 1951 showing Kathmandu Durbar Square

=== Road ===
The total length of roads in Nepal is recorded to be 17,182 km (10,676 mi), as of 2003–04. This fairly large network has helped the economic development of the country, particularly in the fields of agriculture, horticulture, vegetable farming, industry and also tourism. In view of the hilly terrain, transportation takes place in Kathmandu are mainly by road and air. Kathmandu is connected by the Tribhuvan Highway to the south connecting India, Prithvi Highway to the west and Araniko Highway to the north connecting China. The BP Highway connects Kathmandu to the eastern part of Nepal through Sindhuli District. The BP Highway was constructed as a short cut from Kathmandu to Terai.

=== Bus services ===
Sajha Yatayat, established in 1962, provides regular bus services throughout Kathmandu and the surrounding valley, including to the airport. Other bus companies including micro-bus companies operate several unscheduled routes. Electric Trolleybuses also used to operate on the route between Tripureshwor and Suryabinayak Municipality.

=== Airport ===
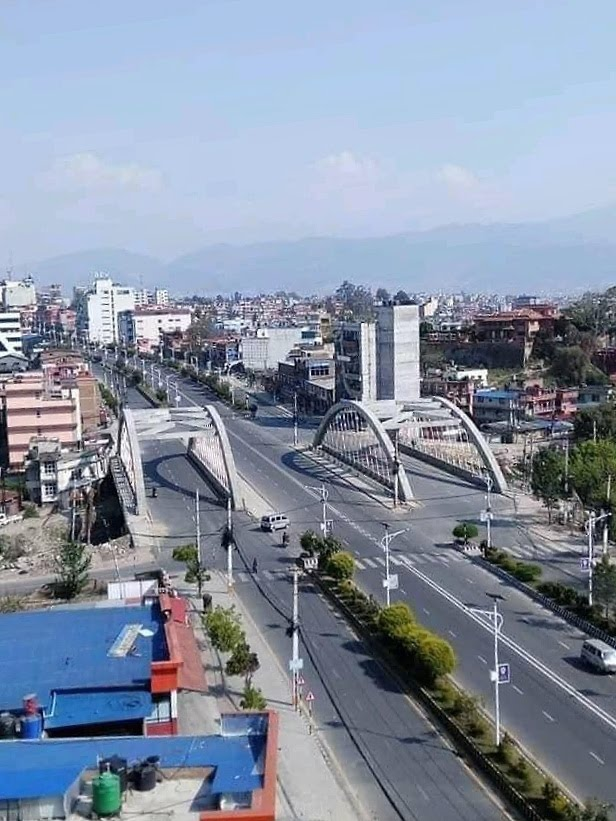
Baneshwor, the location of the International Convention Centre in Kathmandu

Tribhuvan International Airport is abbreviated as TIA and in 2024 nonstop international destinations included a wide range of airports. Domestic flights are offered by several Nepali airlines. Larger aircraft that can land and takeoff on the runways of Tribhuvan International Airport are Boeing 777, Airbus A330, and Boeing 787 Dreamliner. However, the overwhelming number of scheduled flights are landed and started with the ATR 72/42 and the Bombardier Dash 8.

== Mountaineering ==
=== Ropeways and cable cars ===
Ropeways in Nepal are an important transportation means in hilly terrain. A ropeway operated between Kathmandu and Hetauda over a length of 43 km (27 mi) which carried 25 tonnes of goods per hour. Service was discontinued due to poor carrying capacity and maintenance issues. During the Rana period, a ropeway was constructed between Matatirtha in Kathmandu to Dhorsing in Makwanpur District of over 22 km (14 mi) in length, which carried a cargo of 8 tonnes per hour. At present, cable cars are operated from Kathmandu to the Chandragiri Hills.

== Media ==
Kathmandu is the television hub of Nepal. Nepal Television (established in 1984) is the oldest and most-watched television channel in Nepal, as is government-owned NTV PLUS and also Kantipur Television, Image Channel, Sagarmatha Television, Himalaya TV, AP1 TV, and other channels.

The headquarters of many of the country's news outlets are also in the city including Kathmandu Tribune, the government-owned Gorkhapatra (the oldest national daily newspaper in Nepal), The Kathmandu Post, Nepali Times, Kantipur Publications and its paper Kantipur, Naya Patrika, The Himalayan Times, Karobar Economic Daily, Aarthik Abhiyan National Daily and Jana Aastha National Weekly.

Nepal Republic Media, the publisher of myRepublica, joined a publishing alliance with the International Herald Tribune (IHT) to publish the Asia Pacific Edition of IHT from Kathmandu from 20 July 2011. There is also a state-run National News Agency (RSS).

Radio Nepal is a state-run organization that operates national and regional radio stations; these stations are: Hits FM, Radio Kantipur, HBC 94 FM, Radio Sagarmatha and Image FM. The BBC also has an FM broadcasting station in Kathmandu. Some community radio stations such as Radio Pratibodh and Radio Upatyaka also broadcast within the valley.

Kathmandu is referenced in Bob Seger's 1975 song "Katmandu," off of his "Beautiful Loser," album, which portrays the city as a distant refuge from the frustrations of American life.

== Sports ==
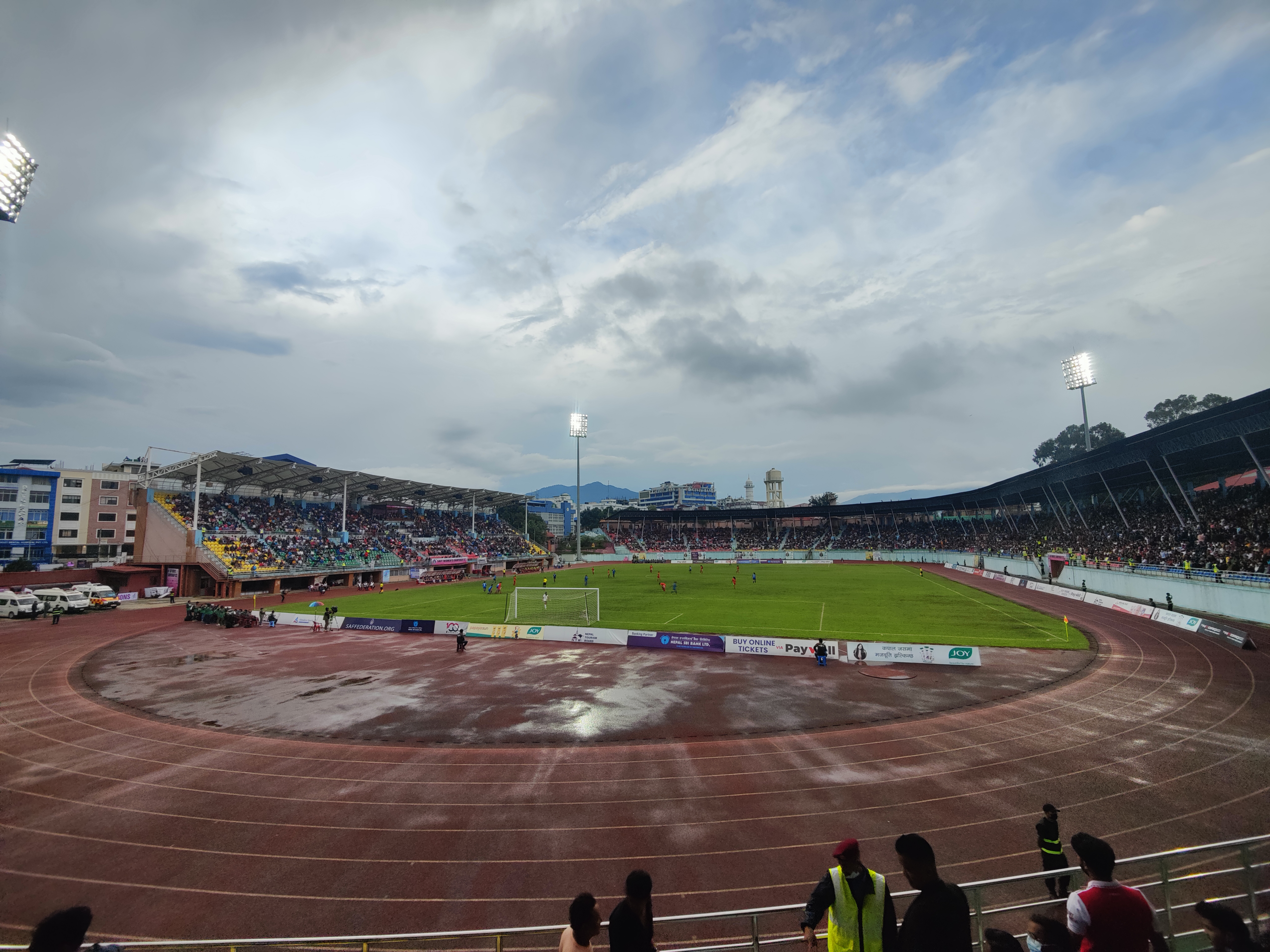
Dasharath Rangasala

Cricket, football and volleyball are the most popular sports among the younger generation in Nepal and there are several stadiums in the city. The sport is governed by the National Sports Council from its headquarters in Kathmandu. The only international football stadium in the city is the Dasharath Rangasala, a multi-purpose stadium used mostly for football matches and cultural events, in the neighbourhood of Tripureshwor. Built in 1956, it is the largest stadium in Nepal with a capacity of 25,000 spectators. The Martyr's Memorial League is also held in this ground every year. The stadium was renovated with Chinese aid before the 8th South Asian Games were held in Kathmandu in 1999 and floodlights were installed. Kathmandu is home to the oldest football clubs of Nepal such as Ranipokhari Corner Team (RCT), Sankata Club and New Road Team (NRT). Other prominent clubs include Manang Marsyangdi Club, Machhindra FC, Tribhuvan Army Club (TAC) and Nepal Police Club.

Kathmandu is also home of some of the oldest cricket clubs in Nepal, such as Yengal Sports Club. Kathmandu Gorkhas represents Kathmandu in the Nepal Premier League.

== International relations and organizations ==
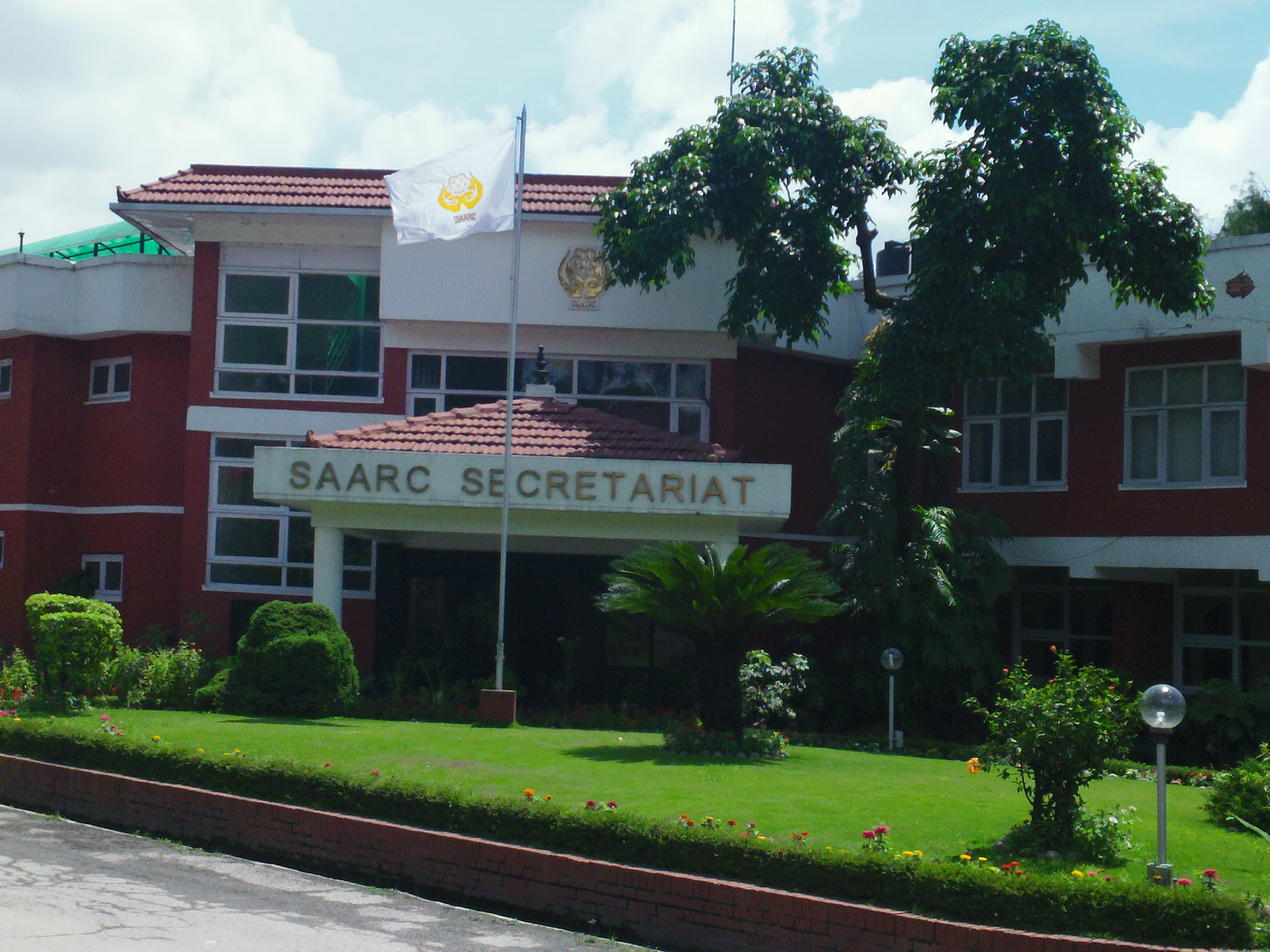
South Asian Association for Regional Cooperation Secretariat in Kathmandu

Kathmandu established an International Relations Secretariat in order to promote international relations. The city's first international relationship was established in 1975 with the city of Eugene, Oregon, United States; this was further enhanced by establishing formal relationships with 15 other cities: Matsumoto (Japan), Rochester (United States), Fredericksburg (United States), Boulder (United States), Yangon (formerly Rangoon, Myanmar), Xi'an (China), Shenzhen (China), Chengdu (China), Lhasa (China), Nanjing (China), Lanzhou (China), Minsk (Belarus), Varanasi (India), Seoul (South Korea) and Pyongyang (North Korea).

Kathmandu's constant endeavour is to enhance its interaction with other South Asian countries, other international agencies and many other major cities of the world to achieve better urban management and developmental programs for Kathmandu. Kathmandu is home to several international and regional organizations, including the South Asian Association for Regional Cooperation (SAARC) and the International Centre for Integrated Mountain Development (ICIMOD).

=== Twin towns – sister cities ===
Kathmandu is twinned with:

- Eugene, United States
- Fredericksburg, United States
- Boulder, United States
- Lhasa, China
- Shenzhen, China
- Chengdu, China
- Lanzhou, China
- Xi'an, China
- Nanjing, China
- Matsumoto, Japan
- Seoul, South Korea
- Pyongyang, North Korea
- Varanasi, India
- Yangon, Myanmar
- Minsk, Belarus

==== Proposed sister cities ====
- Bangkok, Thailand

== Notable people ==
- King Rana Bahadur, Third King of Nepal
- King Girvan, Fourth King of Nepal
- King Rajendra, Fifth King of Nepal
- King Surendra, Sixth King of Nepal
- King Prithivi, Seventh King of Nepal
- King Gyanendra, Eighth King of Nepal
- King Tribhuvan, Ninth King of Nepal
- King Mahendra, Tenth King of Nepal
- King Birendra, Eleventh King of Nepal
- King Dipendra, Twelfth King of Nepal
- King Khesar, Fifth King of Bhutan
- Bhimsen Thapa, Second Mukhtiyar of Nepal
- Rana Jang Pande, Third Mukhtiyar of Nepal
- Ranga Nath Poudyal, Fourth Mukhtiyar of Nepal
- Pushkar Shah, Fifth Mukhtiyar of Nepal
- Jung Bahadur Rana, Founder of Rana Dynasty of Nepal
- Gehendra Sumsher Rana, First Scientist of Nepal
- Laxmi Prasad Devkota, Renowned Poet of Nepal
- Martyrs of Nepal:
  - Dharma Bhakta Mathema
  - Gangalal Shrestha
  - Dashrath Chand
  - Shukraraj Shastri
- Madan Krishna Shrestha, actor and comedian
- Hari Bansha Acharya, actor and comedian
- Manisha Koirala, Bollywood actress
- Rohit Saraf, Bollywood actor
- Rajesh Hamal, actor
- Amrita Acharia, actress
- Curtis Waters, recording artist
- Anuradha Koirala, social activist
- Pushpa Basnet, social activist
- Pardeep Bastola, Nepali movie actor
- Baikuntha Manandhar, marathon runner
- Narendra Man Singh, football player
- Paras Khadka, cricketer
- Shriya Shah-Klorfine, Nepalese-Canadian who died on Mount Everest
- Priti Rijal, professional tennis player
- Sushma Shakya, artist
- Balendra Shah, Prime Minister of Nepal
- Gagan Thapa, politician
- Prakash Man Singh, politician
- Nirmal Purja, Nims Dai, mountaineer – 14 peaks
- Asta Narayan Manandhar, founder of the first bicycle shop in Kathmandu in 1925
- Prabal Gurung, fashion designer
- Binod Chaudhary, businessman, politician and philanthropist
- Abiral Ghimire, professional kickboxer and World Super Welterweight Champion

== Gallery ==
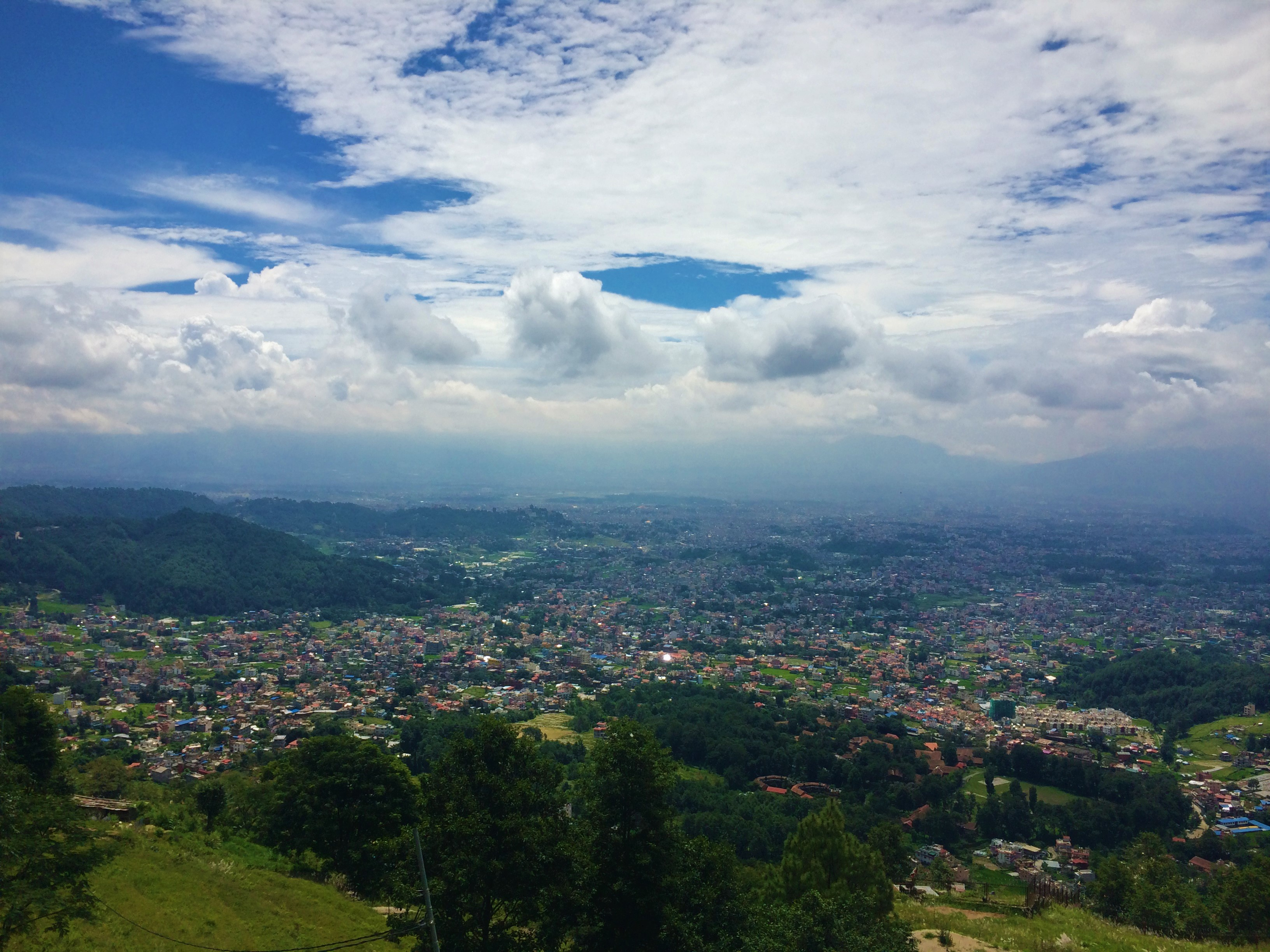
Kathmandu valley as seen from the Shivapuri hills

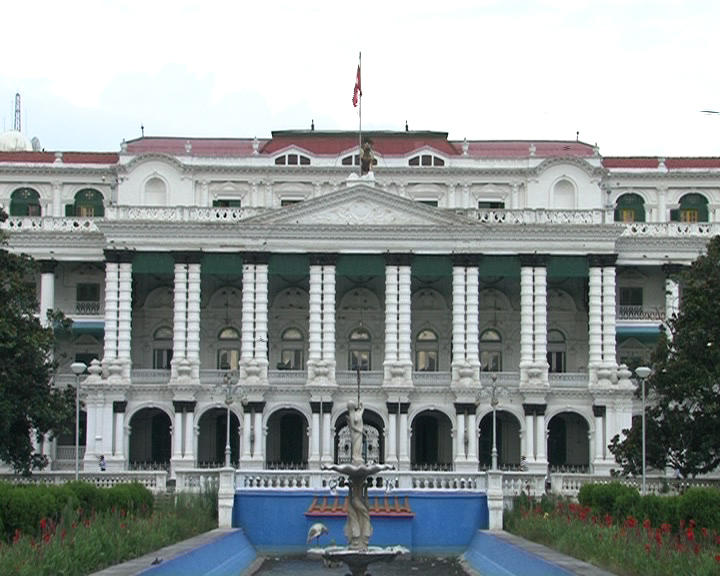
Singha Durbar

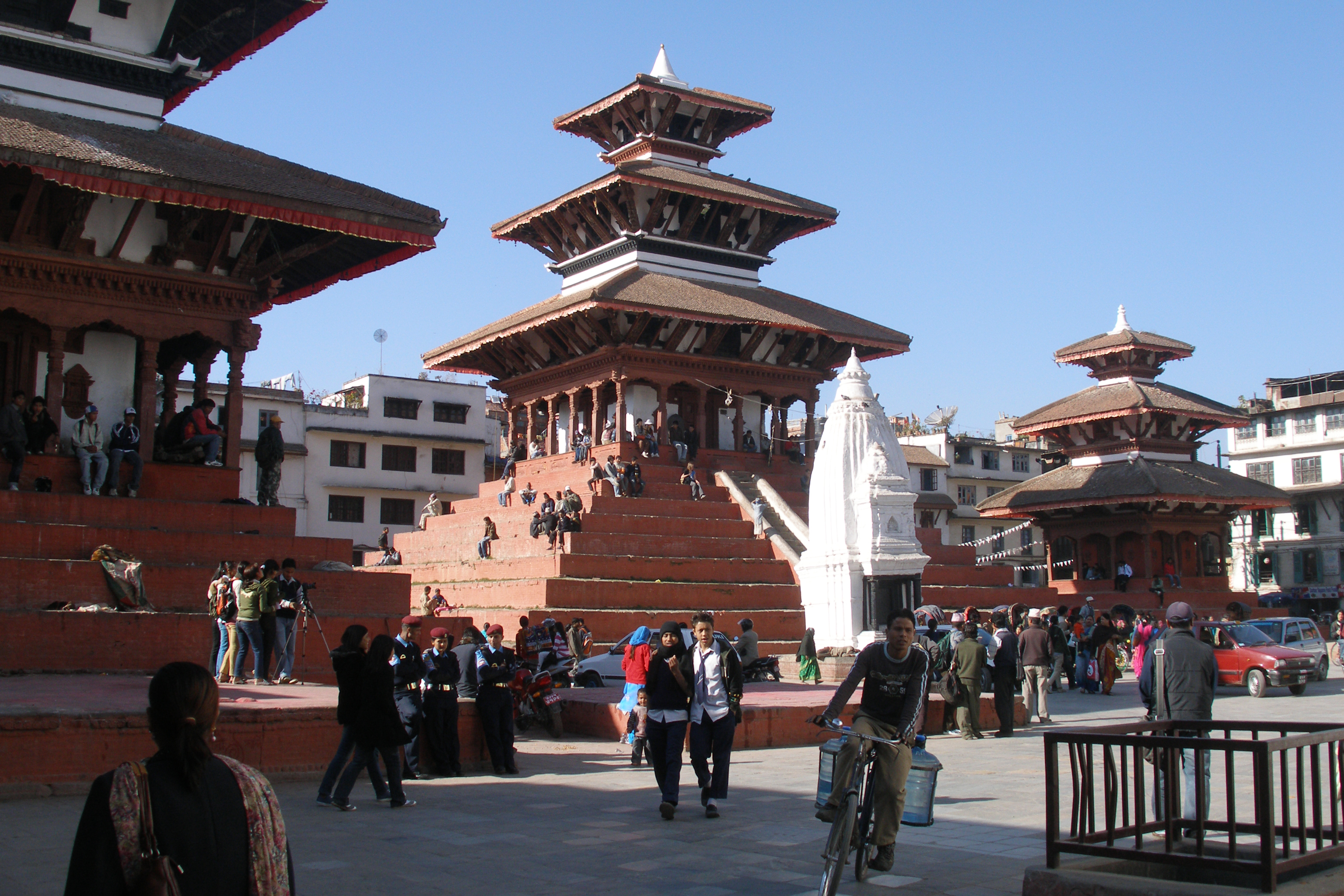
Basantapur Durbar Square

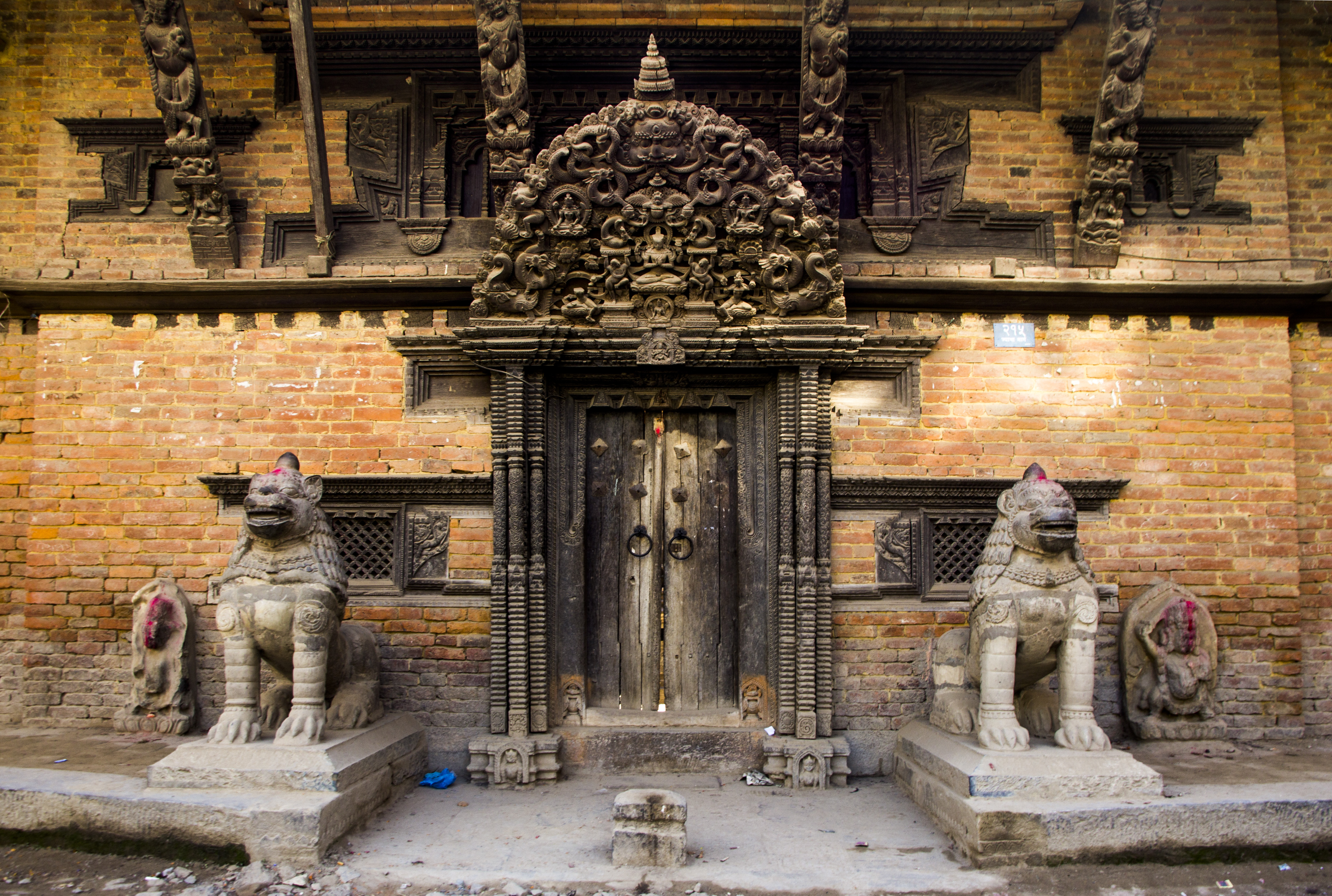
Entrance to a building in the Durbar Square

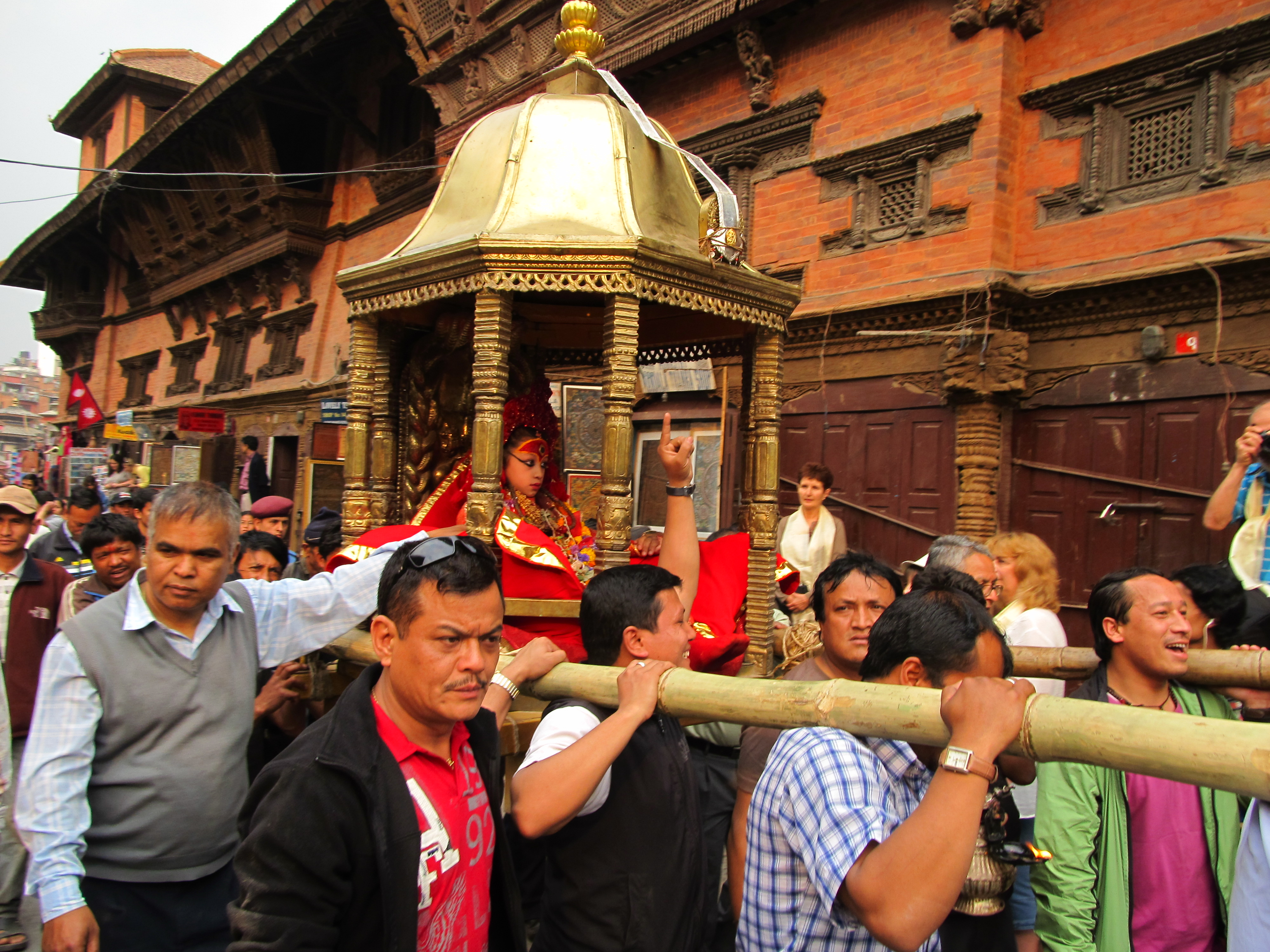
Goddess Kumari in a chariot procession

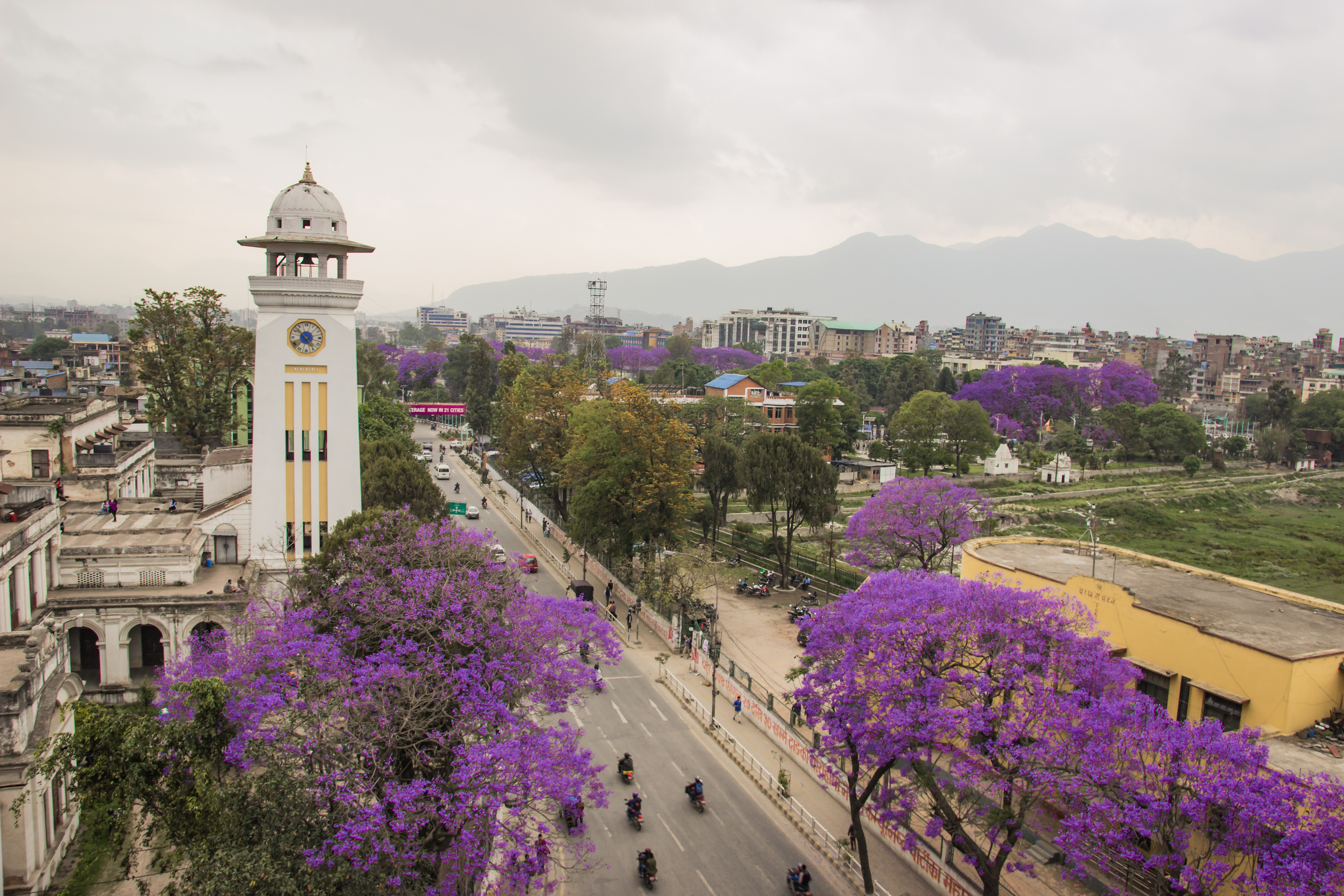
Ghanta Ghar and surrounding areas

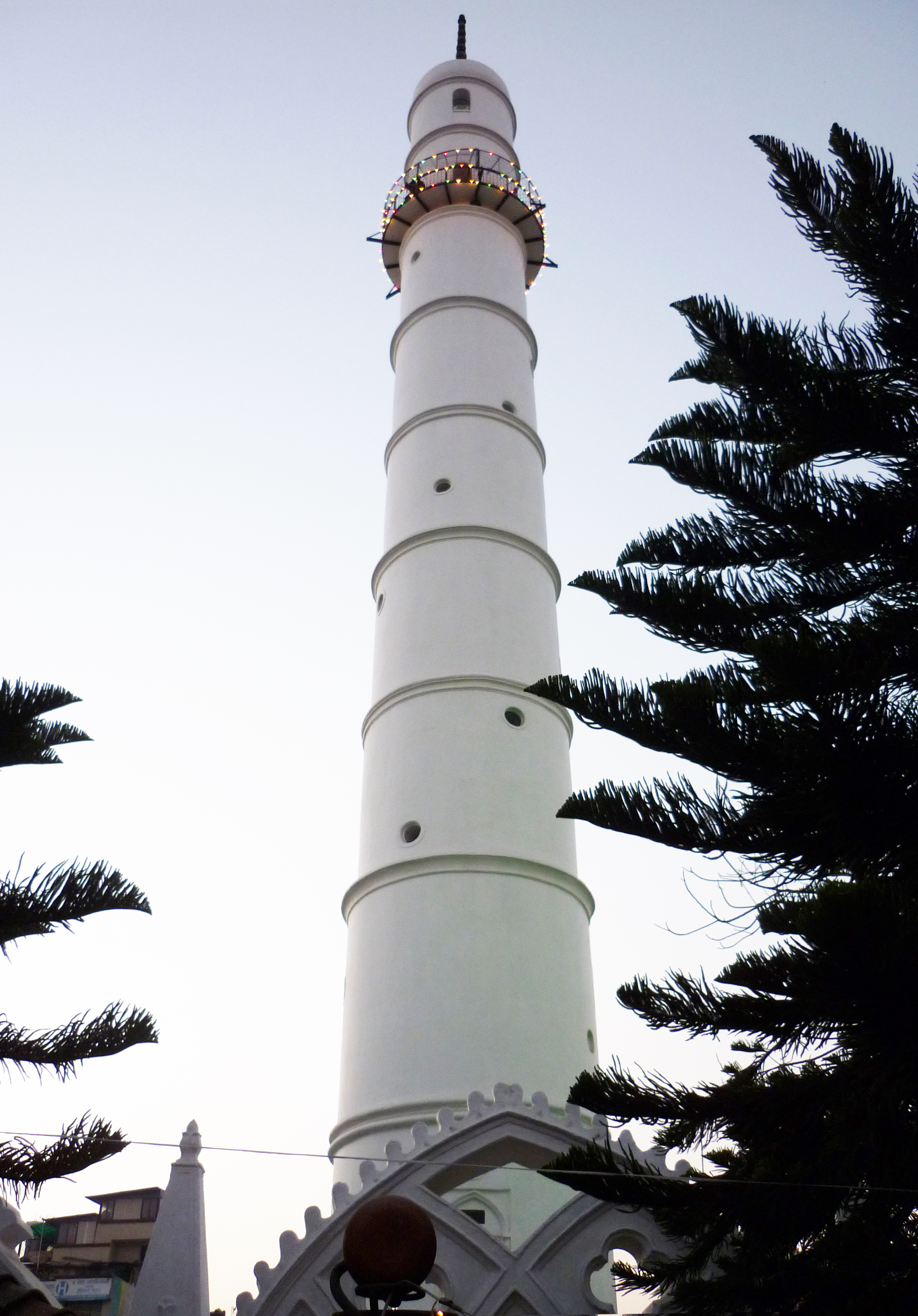
Dharahara in 2014

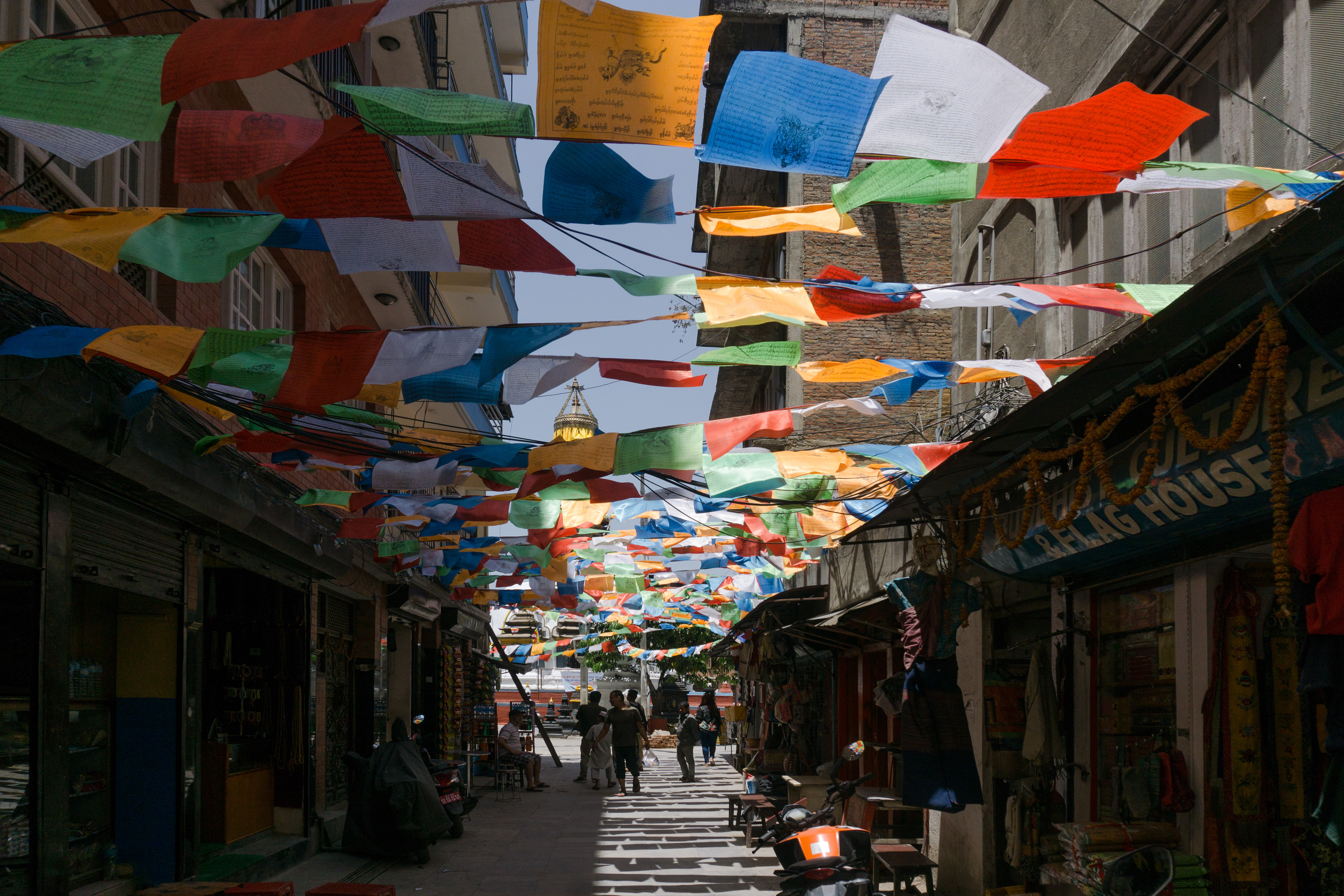
Alleyway in Boudhanath

== See also ==
- Kathmandu District
- Kathmandu Valley
- Tourism in Kathmandu
