= List of newspapers in Nepal =

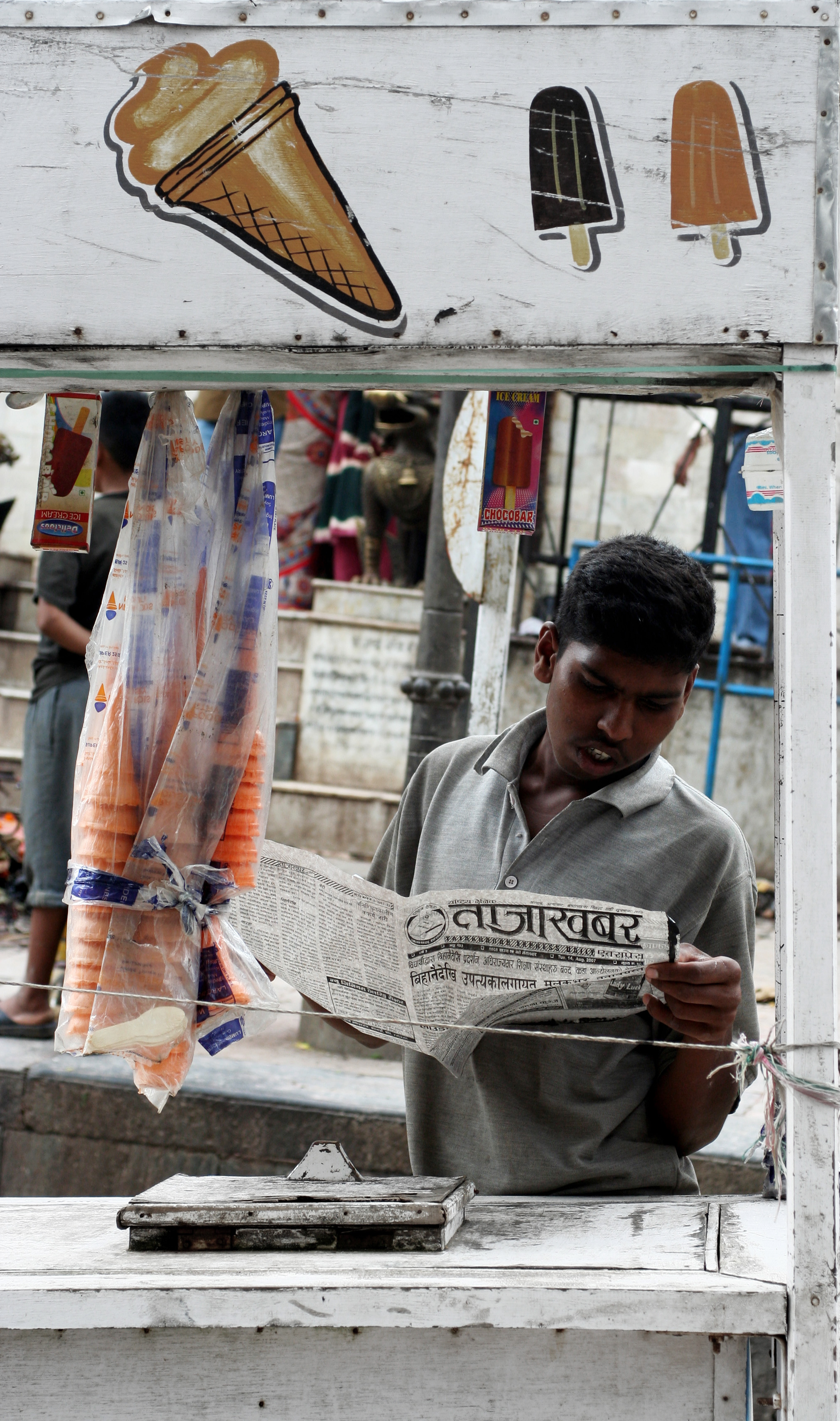
A newspaper reader in Nepal, 2007

There is no recorded history of printed newspaper prior to Rana rule in Nepal. The first-hand press was imported by Jung Bahadur Rana after his visit to Europe; however, it was used only after 58 years for printing. It was used to print religious books and government notices.

The first Nepali language newspaper named Gorkha Bharat Jeewan was published in 1886 BS from Banaras. It was a monthly paper edited by Ram Krishna Barma. However, the printed copies of this magazine has not been found yet. Sudha Sagar was the first media printed in Nepal. It was published monthly from Thahiti Kathmandu. It started in Shrawan, 1955 BS (1898–1899). It was edited by Pandit Naradev Pandey, Moti Krishna Sharma, and Kapil Dev. Sudha Sagar was discontinued shortly afterwards. In 1901, the same editor, Nardev and Moti, started Gorkhapatra though Pashupat press from Thahiti, Kathmandu.

== Before Rana period ==
There is no recorded history of newspapers prior to the Rana rule.

== During Rana rule ==
The list of newspaper published during the Rana rule are listed below:

- Sudha Sagar
- Gorkhapatra
- Sharada
- Udhyog
- Sahitya Shrot
- Gharelu Ilam Patrika
- Shikshya
- Kathmandu Municipal Patrika
- Nepal Shikshya
- Ankha
- Purusartha
- Jagaran Weekly
- Duniyakokhabar Weekly

== After abolishment of Rana rule ==
There were about 170 newspapers prior to the Panchyat era and after the abolishment of Rana rule. Some of them are:

- Awaj was the first daily newspaper of Nepal. It was published in Falgun 8, 2007 BS, just one day after the establishment of democracy. It was published in Kathmandu. Gorkhapatra was published weekly at that time.
- Nepal Guardian was the first English monthly published from Kathmandu in 2010 BS (1953–1954).
- Motherland, an English daily, was started in January 1958. It was discontinued in 1990.

== During Panchayat period ==
In the Panchayat era, newspaper were divided into either pro-Panchayat or anti Panchayat.

- Gorkhapatra became daily from 7 Falgun 2017 BS (2017 BS (1960–1961))

Note: Popular newspapers such as Samaj daily, Chetana weekly, Motherland, Halkhabar, and Diyala were shut down in this period.

== Democratic era ==
The constitution of Nepal 2047 BS, guaranteed press freedom and the right to information to people. Two major newspapers Kantipur and The Kathmandu Post were published by the private sector were published in 2049 BS (1992–1993). The list of notable current newspaper is below.

| S.No. | Newspaper | Language | Frequency | Launch | Owner/Affiliation | References |
|---|---|---|---|---|---|---|
| 1. | Gorkhapatra (गोरखापत्र) | Nepali | Daily | 1901 (weekly)/1961 (daily) | Gorkhapatra Sansthan | |
| 2. | The Himalayan Times | English | Daily | 2001 | International Media Network Nepal | |
| 3. | Janakpur Today | Nepali | Daily | 1991 | Janakpur Today Media Group | |
| 4. | The Kathmandu Post | English | Daily | 1993 | Kantipur Publications | |
| 5. | Himalaya Times | Nepali | Daily | 1993 | Impression Publications and Media Pvt. Ltd. | |
| 6. | Annapurna Post | Nepali | Daily | 2002 | Annapurna Media Network | |
| 7. | Majdoor | Nepali | Daily | | Nepal Workers Peasants Party | |
| 8. | Naya Patrika | Nepali | Daily | | Naya Prakashan Pvt. Ltd. | |
| 9. | Nepal Bhasa Patrika | Newari | Daily | 1955 | | |
| 10. | República | English | Daily | 2009 | Nepal Republic Media | |
| 11. | The Rising Nepal | English | Daily | 1965 | Gorkhapatra Sansthan | |
| 12. | Jana Aastha National Weekly | Nepali | Weekly | | Aastha Prakashan Pvt Ltd. | |
| 13. | Nepal Magazine | Nepali | Weekly | 2000 | Kantipur Publications | |
| 14. | People's Review weekly | English | Weekly | 1991 | Periwinkle Prakashan Pvt Ltd | |
| 15. | Himal Khabarpatrika | Nepali | Weekly | 1998 | Himalmedia | |
| 16. | Nepali Times | English | Weekly | 2000 | Himalmedia | |
| 17. | Saptahik | Nepali | Weekly | 2000 | Kantipur Publications | |
| 18. | Nari | Nepali | Monthly | | Kantipur Publications | |
| 19. | Rajdhani | Nepali | Daily | | Rajdhani News Publication Pvt. Ltd | |
| 20. | Mithila jagaran | Nepali | Weekly | | Mithila jagaran | |
| 21. | Duniyakokhabar Saptahik | English | Weekly | | Duniyakokhabar Saptahik | |
| 22. | Sirshak | शिर्षक | English | Monthly | 2026 | Alan Adhikari (Publisher) | |

== Online-only ==
| Newspaper | Company | Online since | Language |
|---|---|---|---|
| News Bureau Nepal | Trinetra News Network Pvt. Ltd. | 2017 | Nepali |
| eKantipur | KANTIPUR PUBLICATIONS (P) LTD. | 2005-04-01 | Nepali |
| Annapurna Post | Annapurna Media Network | 2002-01-01 | Nepali |
| Sajilo Patrika | Sajilo Media Group Pvt. Ltd. | 2024-01-01 | Nepali |
| Image Khabar | Image Channel Pvt. Ltd. | 2013-05-05 | Nepali |
| The Himalayan Times | International Media Network Nepal (Pvt) Ltd. | 2001-10-08 | English |
| Online Khabar | | | Nepali |
| Nepal Rastriya dainik | Editorial Nepal Pvt Ltd | | Nepali |
| Nepal National Daily | Editorial Nepal Pvt Ltd | | English |
| Nepalkhabar.com | नेपाल खबर प्रा.लि | 2014-07-07 | Nepali |
| Ratopati | Discovery News Network | 2015 | Nepali and English |
| The Ritible | Manoble Corporation Pvt. Ltd. | 2024-12-18 | English |

== See also ==
- Media of Nepal
- Newari Newspaper
