= List of Nepalese media =

This is a list of all Media of Nepal including radio, television, newspapers, magazines, digital media, and online portals.

== A ==
- ABC Television
- Atridev Khabar

== D ==
Dkrop

== H ==
- Himal Khabarpatrika
- Himalaya Television

== I ==
- Image Channel

== K ==
- Kantipur Television
- Karobar Economic Daily
- Khoj Samachar
- kohalpurtoday

== M ==
- Mountain Television

== N ==
- Nepal Television
- News 24 (Nepali TV channel)
- Naya Patrika

== O ==
- Online Khabar

== R ==
- www.ratopati.com
- Radio Kapilvastu
- Radio Nepal
- Radio Sagarmatha
- Radio Lumbini
- Radio Jayaprithvi F.M Bajhang

== S ==
- Sagarmatha Television
- sajhasabal
- Samaya sutra media
- Setopati

== T ==
- TechPana
- Terai Television
- The Himalayan Times
- The Kathmandu Post
- The Rising Nepal

== U ==
- Unibig News
