= Mass media in Nepal =

Mass media in Nepal include radios, televisions, newspapers and the online services.

== Radio ==
Historically, radio has been the most prevalent form of mass communication in Nepal. Government-owned Radio Nepal has been the sole domestic radio provider since 1951. By 1995 it was broadcasting short-wave, medium-wave, and FM frequencies. Private operators can lease the FM channel.

- Radios: 2,000,000 (2006)
- Radio stations: AM 6, FM 200, shortwave 1 (2015)

== Television ==
Television started broadcasting in 1985. Broadcasters include government-owned Nepal Television (NT), which has two channels, and private broadcasters Nepal One, Shangri-La, and Space Time Network. All private broadcasters have experienced financial losses and content restrictions. Foreign programs can be accessed via satellite or cable. Statistics on viewership are not available, but less than 15 percent of the population appear to have access.

Television launched as a project under the sixth development plan (1980-1985) with the slogan "Communication for Development". Its mission statement was "Produce and telecast programs on educational, religious and cultural conservation to promote national unity, conserve heritage and promote national interest". It was part of a research project to study the feasibility of establishing television to ascertain if this was economically and technically possible. NT had a monopoly for over 15 years.

Nepal has seventeen television broadcasters including NT and NTV PLUS. The private broadcasters are Kantipur Television owned by Kantipur Publication; Image Channel owned by Image Groups of Companies and Avenues Television, Galaxy 4K owned by Gorkha Media Network Private Limited, Nepal Network TV NNTV owned & managed by DAR Group of Industries. A news and current affairs channel is owned by Avenues Ad and started broadcasting in July 2007. Sagarmatha Television, launched in July 2007. ABC TV Nepal and National TV launched in 2008, News 24, Himalaya Television and Mountain Television launched in 2010. Entertainment channels emerged in 2009 beginning with TV Filmy, with E-24 Television launching in 2012. Regional Channels like Terai Television, Nepal Mandal and Makalu Television started in 2010. Mission Star launched. Nepal 1 is beamed from India. Channel Nepal was the first Nepali language satellite channel, which discontinued in 2011. Other channels include: AP1 HD TV, Mountain television, Arena Television, Himskhikhar Television, Young Asia Television (Nepal), Araniko Television, BroadTV and Mero TV.

- Television broadcast stations: 18 (2012) (plus 9 repeaters) (2007)
- Televisions: 500,000 (2006)

== Periodicals ==
According to government figures, in 2003 Nepal had 3,741 registered newspapers of which 251 were published daily. The Government-owned Gorkhapatra (Gorkha Journal) had the highest daily circulation at around 75,000. Most registered newspapers were published either weekly (1,304) or monthly (1,122). Most vernacular news media are regarded as having little credibility as a result of affiliations with political parties.

- English language newspapers are The Rising Nepal, Republica, The Kathmandu Post, and The Himalayan Times.
- Magazines and periodicals - 295

== Online ==
Some domestic providers are able to top the list of most visited news sites in Nepal. Common national and regional web news portals of Nepal include, News Bureau Nepal, Janacharcha.com, CDG Nepal, Setopati, Online Khabar,TechPana, Image Khabar, Nepal Khabar, eKantipur, Presschitra, Sirshak by Sirshak Media Network, The Nepal Times, NepMag, Nepal Live, Khoj Samachar and web portals from print media. The Kathmandu Post and its affiliated eKantipur, The Himalayan Times and República, News House Nepal, Nepal Live Today, among others, publish their online versions in English.

== See also ==
- Censorship in Nepal
