= Basanta Basnet =

Nepali journalist and writer

.
- बसन्त बस्नेत
- Education: IACER, Pokhara University
- Occupations: Journalist, writer
- Employer: Onlinekhabar
- Notable work: 72 ko Bismaya, Mahabhara, Simsara

Basanta Basnet (Nepali: बसन्त बस्नेत) is a Nepalese journalist and writer. He is an editor at Onlinekhabar, an online news portal. He started working at Online Khabar since 17 July 2022, after resigning from Shilapatra. Earlier, he worked at Kantipur (daily) as a political correspondent. He was also an editor at Nepal Magazine.

== Journalism ==
He was the former editor at Nepal Magazine and Shilapatra, an online news portal. He was the editor-in-chief of Shilapatra from August 31, 2020, to July 2022. He has also worked for various national dailies such as Kantipur, Annapurna Today, Annapurna Post and Nagarik.

== Books ==
He has published three books. His first book 72 ko Bismay was published on 8 September 2018. The book is a political non-fiction about the 2015 Nepal earthquake and the events that followed after the promulgation of the constitution of Nepal in 2015 (2072 BS).

His second book, Mahabhara is a novel set in eastern Nepal during the Nepalese Civil War. It was published on 8 January 2022 by FinePrint Publication.

He has published his third book, Simsara on 3 October 2024 by FinePrint Publication.
