= Kantipur Publications =

Nepalese media firm

- Parent company: Kathmandu Media Group
- Status: Active
- Founded: 1993
- Country of origin: Nepal
- Headquarters location: Kathmandu, Nepal
- Distribution: Nepal
- Key people: Shyam Goenka, Kailash Sirohiya
- Publication types: Periodical
- Imprints: Kantipur; The Kathmandu Post; Nepal Magazine; Saptahik; Nari
- Official website: Kantipur Publication

Kantipur Publications Pvt. Ltd. (Nepali: कान्तिपुर पब्लिकेशन्स प्रा. लि.) is a media firm based in Kathmandu, Nepal. The company operates five widely circulated print publications. It is the first media organization in Nepal to gain membership to the World Association of Newspapers and News Publishers. It was founded by Shyam Goenka in 1993. Kailash Sirohiya is the current chairman of the company while his son, Sambhav Sirohiya, is the managing director.

== History ==
In February 1993, exactly two years after Nepal's constitution was amended to permit a free press, Kantipur and The Kathmandu Post were founded by Shyam Goenka, when he was 29 years old. He took the initiative to start the newspapers, with very limited resources, when many people dismissed his efforts to start a private media house as a bad business move. However, Kantipur defied all naysayers and went on to write a history of its own – perhaps the greatest success story for a corporate in Nepal, post-1990 after Binod Raj Gyawali and Kailash Sirohiya took over equal partnership.

This it was a phase when the print media in the private sector not only succeeded in acquiring credibility - a tag that until then was monopolized by the government-owned Gorkhapatra and the Rising Nepal-but also promoted professionalism in journalism, attracting talents to join in.

The massacre of the royal family in June 2001 prompted the first crisis between Kantipur Publications and the government. Two directors of Kantipur, Binod Raj Gyawali and Kailash Sirohiya, were arrested and charged with sedition after publishing comments by a Maoist leader about the death of King Birendra.

The proclamation of a state of emergency on November 26, 2001, by King Gyanendra under the direction of then Prime Minister Sher Bahadur Deuba suspended the press freedom guaranteed by the country's Constitution a decade earlier. Police began a wave of repression: more than fifty journalists were arrested, and many publications were banned outright.

Following a February 1, 2005 royal coup by King Gyanendra, Kantipur Publications operated under tighter restrictions. Journalists throughout Nepal were subject to imprisonment and beatings by the Royal Nepal Army. Kantipur Publications continued to criticize the regime despite the royal proclamation and the ongoing civil war.

In March 2005, Narayan Wagle, editor in chief of Kantipur, was held for questioning by police on suspicion of criticizing the king in print.

During the 2006 uprising, Kantipur Publications continued operations despite increased crackdowns by the monarchy on private media.

Press freedom has been restored since the restoration of democracy in Nepal in May 2006, allowing Kantipur Publications to operate without fear of reprisal by the state.

=== Trouble with Maoists ===
In 2007, Kantipur Publications faced pressure from Maoist-aligned organizations such as the Young Communist League and All Nepal Trade Union Federation. However, an agreement was reached between Kantipur and the Federation. This abruptly led the longest serving chairman Hem Raj Gyawali to resign.

On 21 May 2024, chairman Kailash Sirohiya was arrested at company offices in Kathmandu for alleged violations of citizenship laws after his citizenship card number was found to share that of another. Sirohiya denied wrongdoing and accused Home Minister Rabi Lamichhane of retaliating for the publication of news stories about alleged financial irregularities involving the latter.

=== 2025 Gen Z protests ===
A building of the headquarters of Kantipur Publications was burned by protesters during the 2025 Nepalese Gen Z protests. Staff were reported to be forced out of the headquarters buildings by protesters, who then set fire to one of the buildings that comprises the company headquarters.

The Kantipur and Kathmandu Post websites were also down.

== Properties ==
=== Newspapers and magazines ===
- Kantipur - Daily newspaper, circulation 4,48,000. The most widely read newspaper in Nepal.
- The Kathmandu Post - An English language daily newspaper, circulation 84,000
- Kopila - A weekly supplement that comes with Kantipur. Targeted towards kids.
- Saptahik - A weekly entertainment tabloid, circulation 2,00,000
- Nepal Magazine - Magazine focusing on politics and society, circulation 45,000
- Nari - Women's magazine, monthly circulation 83,000

== Sports franchise ownership ==
Kantipur Publications Pvt. Ltd. owns the Kathmandu-based franchise (Kathmandu Gorkhas) in the Nepal Premier League. The Kathmandu team is one of the key franchises in the league, promoting cricket at both regional and national levels.

== Notable staff (past and present) ==
- Prashant Aryal
- Madhab Basnet
- Bhusan Dahal
- Krishna Jwala Devkota
- Anup Kaphle
- Vijay Kumar Pandey
- Dil Bhusan Pathak
- Pranaya Rana
- Sudheer Sharma
- Malvika Subba
- Suraj Singh Thakuri
- Narayan Wagle

== Broadcasting ==
- Kantipur Television Network - Popularly known as "KTV", provides news and original entertainment. It is an affiliate channel to CNN.
- Kantipur FM - Provides news and original entertainment throughout the Kathmandu Valley on channel 96.1. The first privately owned and operated FM radio station in Nepal. Established in 1998.
- Kantipur Gold - Provides national and international sporting activities, promoting the development of sports in the country.
- Kantipur Max - A television channel which features and broadcasts movie based content. It also incorporates national and international sports events such as football, cricket, and volleyball.
