= Kantipur (disambiguation) =

Kantipur was a medieval kingdom in the Malla confederacy of Nepal. The name of the kingdom was derived from the Sanskrit name of its capital city, now known as Kathmandu.

It may also refer to:

- Kantipur Publications, a Nepali media company, or its properties:
  - Kantipur (daily)
  - Kantipur Television Network
  - Kantipur FM
