= Nepal Magazine =

- Cover of Nepal Magazine (29 January 2017)
- Editor: Basanta Basnet
- Founding Editor: Vijay Kumar Pandey
- Categories: News magazine
- Frequency: Weekly
- Circulation: 45,000
- Publisher: Kailash Sirohiya
- Founded: 2000
- Company: Kantipur Publications
- Country: Nepal
- Language: नेपाली
- Website: nepalmag.com.np

The Nepal Magazine was a weekly national magazine published by Kantipur Media Group in Kathmandu, which also published Kantipur and The Kathmandu Post. The magazine focused on national socio-political matters of Nepal, with satirical pieces on current affairs and trends of the country, along with lighter stories on lifestyle and arts. Nepal had the country's largest circulation for a weekly news-magazine, according to the official data released by Press Council Nepal in 2016. Basanta Basnet was the editor.

After the COVID-19 pandemic in Nepal, Kantipur media group stopped publishing Nepal Magazine, along with its other publications.

== History ==
Nepal Magazine was established in 2000 as a fortnightly magazine. It covered political issues along with photo stories, movie reviews, celebrity gossip and literature. Its two notable annual publications were "Plus 2 College Ranking" and "Person of the Year". Nepal was generally regarded as a leading and influential Nepali magazine, along with Himal Khabarpatrika.

== Editors ==
Past editors include Vijay Kumar Pandey, Tirtha Koirala, Kishor Nepal, Prashant Aryal, Sudheer Sharma, Narayan Wagle and Basanta Basnet.

== Notable staff and columnists (past and present) ==
- Prashant Aryal
- Madhab Basnet
- Rabindra Mishra
- Leela Mani Paudyal
- Ram Bahadur Rawal
- Khagendra Sangraula
- Abhi Subedi
