= Rudi River (Nepal) =

River in Nepal

- Location within Nepal

Physical characteristics
- Mouth: Madi River
  - coordinates: 28.197972°N 84.193317°E

The Rudi River, or Rudi Khola (Nepali: रुडी खोला) is a river in Nepal, a left tributary of the Madi River.

== Hydrology ==
The Rudi is one of nine major tributaries of the Madi Nadi with basins that cover more than 11 square miles (28 km^{2}). The others are the Midim, Paste, Birdi, Khalte, Pisti, Risti, Sange and Kalesti. The river's discharge is highest between mid-April and mid-December, when there is most rain, with less water from mid-December to mid-April.

In July 1951, heavy rain in the area caused landslide and flood in the Rudi. Around 12–15 hectares (30–37 acres) of khet land (irrigated lowland) was damaged, and large areas were yet to be reclaimed in 2004. In July 2018 flooding caused serious damage to the Rudi Khola-A hydropower project, which was under construction. The penstock pipe was destroyed and the recently completed road badly damaged.

== Crossings ==
The Gurung Heritage Trail crosses the Rudi Khola on a swing bridge in the section from Pakhrikot to Bagicha. On 27 July 2017 a bus travelling from Pokhara to Beluwabesi, Kaski District was crossing the river at Madhya on the border between Lamjung and Kaski district when the old and poorly maintained bridge collapsed. The bus fell into the river, and several passengers suffered serious injuries or death.

== Hydroelectricity ==
There are two run-of-the-river hydroelectricity plants on the river operated by Bindhyabasini Hydropower Development Company Limited (BHDCL). The 8.8 MW Rudi Khola-A is in Mijuredanda VDC of Kaski District. The 6.6 MW Rudi Khola-B is just upstream in Pasguan VDC, Lamjung District. Rudi A uses discharge from Rudi Khola and Chheduwa Khola, with a catchment area of 53.43 square kilometres (20.63 sq mi). The catchment area of Rudi Khola-B is 35.3 square kilometres (13.6 sq mi), and includes the whole Ligus Khola basin. The variable rainfall means the power supply varies seasonally.

== Sources ==
- "Bindhyabasini Hydropower Company to issue IPO worth Rs.25 Crore; issue added to SEBON pipeline", Sharesansar, 17 January 2020
- Grading Rationale: Bindhyabasini Hydropower Development Company Limited (PDF), CARE Ratings Nepal, February 2020
- "Gurung Heritage Trail", Nepal Himalaya Guide
- Khanal, Narendra Raj (March 2004), "Floods in mountain watershed: A case of Madi River, Central Nepal" (PDF), Journal of Hydrology and Meteorology, 1 1issue=1
- "One missing, nine seriously injured in Lamjung bus incident", The Himalayan Times, 27 July 2017
- Rana, Ramji (6 July 2018), "Monsoon induced flood hits Rudi Khola 'A' hydel project", The Himalayan Times
- Rudi Khola- B Small Hydropower Project (6.6 MW), BHDC: Bindhyabasini Hydropower Development Company Limited
