= Rudi A Hydropower Station =

Dam in Lamjung District

- Location within Nepal
- Official name: Rudi A Hydropower Project
- Country: Nepal
- Location: Kaski District
- Coordinates: 28°13′51″N 84°13′00″E
- Purpose: Power
- Status: Operational
- Opening date: 19 May 2019
- Owner: Bindhabasini Hydropower Development Company Pvt.Ltd

Dam and spillways
- Type of dam: Gravity
- Impounds: Rudi River (Nepal)

Power Station
- Commission date: 2075-12-05 BS
- Type: Run-of-the-river
- Turbines: 2
- Installed capacity: 8.8 MW

Rudi A Hydropower Station (Nepali: रुदी A जलविद्युत आयोजना) is a run-of-river hydro-electric plant located in the Kaski District of Nepal that came into operation in 2019. The flow from the Rudi River is used to generate 8.8 MW electricity.

== Location and water supply ==
The Rudi River, or Rudi Khola, is one of nine major tributaries of the Madi Nadi with basins that cover more than 11 square miles (28 km^{2}). The others are the Midim, Paste, Birdi, Khalte, Pisti, Risti, Sange and Kalesti. The river's discharge is highest between mid-April and mid-December, when there is most rain, with less water from mid-December to mid-April.

There are two run-of-the-river hydroelectricity plants on the river operated by Bindhyabasini Hydropower Development Company Limited (BHDCL). The 8.8 MW Rudi Khola-A is in Mijuredanda VDC of Kaski District. The 6.6 MW Rudi Khola-B is just upstream in Pasguan VDC, Lamjung District. Rudi A uses discharge from Rudi Khola and Chheduwa Khola, with a catchment area of 53.43 square kilometres (20.63 sq mi). The catchment area of Rudi Khola-B is 35.3 square kilometres (13.6 sq mi), and includes the whole Ligus khola basin.

== Construction ==
High Himalayan Hydro Construction Pvt Ltd undertook civil construction, while North Hydro and Engineering was responsible to hydro mechanical construction and Toshiba Plant System and Service Corporation undertook the electro-mechanical construction.

In September 2016 work on Rudi A and Rudi B was halted due to floods and landslides. The main storage site of Rudi A was washed away, and the powerhouse had to be relocated. In July 2018 flooding again caused serious damage to the Rudi Khola A hydropower project, which was under construction. The penstock pipe was destroyed and the recently completed road was badly damaged. The project was almost complete, including construction of the powerhouse, electromechanical connection of the turbine and generator, headworks and transmission line.

Trial power generation from Rudi A began in September 2018. The project began commercial operation on 19 May 2019. Total costs were Rs. 1,555 million, with a debt-equity ration of 68:32.

== Technology ==
Rudi A was initially developed as a 6.8MW run-of-the-river hydroelectricity project. Later this was changed to become a tailrace project of Rudi-B. This created greater hydraulic head and volume from the Chhedewa Khola and Rudi Khola to the head pond near Rudi B. The catchment was now 53.43 square kilometres (20.63 sq mi). The design was upgraded to 8.8MW with 276.89 metres (908.4 ft) net head and 3.72 cubic metres per second (131 cu ft/s) discharge at Q40%.

Water is carried 6 kilometres (3.7 mi) to the Rudi A powerhouse from Kaski's Singdi Basin and Lamjung's Singdi Dam. Components include the intake, 138 metres (453 ft) reinforced concrete approach culvert, head pond, 4,932 metres (16,181 ft) headrace pipe, surge tank, 1,070 metres (3,510 ft) penstock connecting the surge tank to the powerhouse, and 72 metres (236 ft) tailrace canal. The powerhouse holds two 4840kW horizontal Pelton wheels, each with a rated discharge of 1.86 cubic metres per second (66 cu ft/s) and rated head of 276.89 metres (908.4 ft). They power two horizontal 3 phase AC synchronous brushless excitation generators, each with rated voltage of 6.3 kV.

Power from Rudi B is carried on a 3.5 kilometres (2.2 mi) 33kV transmission line to the Rudi A switchyard. Power from Rudi A is carried on a 4.5 kilometres (2.8 mi) 33kV transmission line to Nepal Electricity Authority's substation at Mijuredanda. The variable flow means the power supply varies seasonally.

== Commercial arrangements ==
The plant is owned and developed by Bindhabasini Hydropower Development Company Pvt.Ltd. (BHDCL), an Independent Power Producer of Nepal. BHDCL has a 30-year power purchase agreement with Nepal Electricity Authority (NEA) with contracted energy of 46,860,000 units for Rudi A and 33,210,000 units for Rudi B. Higher tariffs apply in the dry season than the wet season.

The generation licence will expire in 2105-09-11 BS, after which the plant will be handed over to the government. The power station is connected to the national grid and the electricity is sold to Nepal Electricity Authority.

== See also ==
- List of power stations in Nepal

== Sources ==
- Belina Thapa (5 February 2020), "रुदीखोलामा १५.४ मेगावाट विद्युत उत्पादन", GorakhaPatra (in Nepali)
- "Bindhyabasini Hydropower Company to issue IPO worth Rs.25 Crore; issue added to SEBON pipeline", Sharesansar, 17 January 2020
- Grading Rationale: Bindhyabasini Hydropower Development Company Limited (PDF), CARE Ratings Nepal, February 2020
- Khanal, Narendra Raj (March 2004), "Floods in mountain watershed: A case of Madi River, Central Nepal" (PDF), Journal of Hydrology and Meteorology, 1 1issue=1
- Monthly Progress Report January, 2019 Rudi-A Small Hydro Power Project (8.8 MW) (PDF), BHDCL
- Navin Raj Kuinkel (28 July 2018), "पहिरोले रुदी हाइड्रोमा क्षति, विद्युत उत्पादन मिति लम्बियो", पहिरोले रुदी हाइड्रोमा क्षति, विद्युत उत्पादन मिति लम्बियो (Annapurna Post) (in Nepali)
- Rana, Ramji (6 July 2018), "Monsoon induced flood hits Rudi Khola 'A' hydel project", The Himalayan Times
- "Rudi 'A' hydroproject to generate electricity from mid-July", The Himalayan Times, 5 May 2018
- Rudi Khola - A Small Hydropower Project (8.8 MW), BHDC
- Rudi Khola- B Small Hydropower Project (6.6 MW), BHDC: Bindhyabasini Hydropower Development Company Limited
- Salient Features of Rudi Khola- A SHP(8.8MW) (PDF), BHDC
- Saroj Bhattarai (2016-09-11), "रुदी 'ए' र रुदी 'बी' साना जलविद्युत आयोजना : निर्माणकार्य ठप्प", NepalEnergyForum (in Nepali)
- Yashada Sunuwar (2018-10-11), "८.८ रुदी 'ए' जलविद्युत अायाेजनाबाट विद्युत उत्पादन सुरु", UrjaKhabar (in Nepali)
