= Rajdhani (newspaper) =

Newspaper published in Kathmandu, Nepal

Rajdhani राजधानी
- Type: Daily newspaper
- Format: Broadsheet
- Founder: Mahendra Sherchan
- Publisher: Sachin Sherchan
- Editor-in-chief: Dilli Aacharya
- Language: Nepali
- Headquarters: Saraswati Nagar, Chabahill, Kathmandu
- Country: Nepal
- Website: rajdhanidaily.com

Rajdhani (Nepali: राजधानी) is a Nepali language daily newspaper published from Kathmandu. It was founded by Mahendra Sherchan.

== See also ==
- List of newspapers in Nepal
- Media of Nepal
