= List of FM radio stations in Nepal =

This is a partial list of FM radio stations in Nepal.

== List of stations ==
Call Sign	Frequency (MHz)	District	Operator	Language	Genre	First air date
Saypatri FM	91.6	Baglung				
Vijayapur fm	98.8	Dharan, Sunsari		Nepal	Nepali,	
Radio Tharuhat	Online	Bara	Tharuhat media Pvt.Ltd.	Nepali & Tharu		
Radio Nijgadh	107.2	Bara	Nijgadh Suchana Thatha Sanchar Sahakari Sansthan	Nepali, English & Bhojpuri		
Baglung FM	96.4	Baglung	Baglung Suchana Tatha Sanchar Sahakari Sanstha Ltd			
Dhaulagiri FM	98.6	Baglung				
Saipal Radio	100.6	Bajhang	Group for Social Development Nepal			
Bheri Awaj FM	95.6	Banke	Research for Humanism Center			
Bageshwori FM	94.6	Banke				Oct 12, 2004
Bheri FM	105.4	Banke	Nepal Press Institute			
Radio Kantipur FM	101.8	Banke	Radio Kantipur Ptv. Ltd.			
Radio Gurubaga	106.4	Bardiya	Prachin Srijanshil Aadiwashi Samaj			
Nepali ko Radio	88.8	Bhaktapur				
Bhaktapur FM	105.4	Bhaktapur				
Synergy FM	91.6	Chitwan				
Kalika FM	95.2	Chitwan				
Radio Nepal	103	Chitwan				
Swargadwari FM	102.8	Dang	Swargadwari Sanchar Kendra			
Tulsipur FM	101.6	Dang	Rapti Sanchar Sewa			
Dhading FM	106.0	Dhading				
Community Radio Dhankuta	92.2	Dhunkuta	Samudayik Bikashka Lagi Sanchar Nepal			
Kantipur FM	96.1	Dhankuta	Kantipur FM Pvt. Ltd.			
Radio Dhankuta	106.2	Dhankuta				
Radio Today	91.0	Dhanusha				
Radio Janakpur	97.0	Dhanusha				
Radio Mithila	100.0	Dhanusha				
Radio Janakpur FM	101.8	Dhanusha				
Radio Mithilanchal	105.0	Dhanusha				
Janaki FM	106.0	Dhanusha				
Radio Gulmi	91.2	Gulmi				
Radio Ruru FM	94.8	Gulmi				
Radio Resunga	106.2	Gulmi				
Kanchan Jhanga FM	92.6	Jhapa				
Radio Pathibara FM	93.6	Jhapa				
Radio FM Methi Tunes	96.8	Jhapa				
Radio Sandesh	103.9	Jhapa				
Radio Birta FM	105.0	Jhapa				
Radio Sunrise	105.9	Jhapa				
Radio Seemana FM	106.9	Jhapa				
Radio Nagarik FM	107.5	Jhapa				
Karnali FM	105.2	Jumla	Karnali Integrated Rural Development & Research Center			
Radio Ghodaghodi FM	88.3	Kailali(Ghodaghodi)	Ghodaghodi Media Communication Group			
Khaptad FM	91.4	Kailali	Khaptad Communication Pvt. Ltd.			
Dinesh FM	93.8	Kailali				
Radio Kantipur FM	101.8	Kailali	Kantipur FM Pvt. Ltd.			
Kanchanpur FM	90.2	Kanchanpur	Sudur Paschim Bikash Sanchar Kendra			
Radio Mahakali	96.2	Kanchanpur				
Shuklaphanta FM	99.4	Kanchanpur	Forum for Local Development			
Radio Gandaki	90.6	Kaski				
Machhapuchhare FM	91.0	Kaski				
Himchuli FM	92.2	Kaski	Pokhara FM Multi Purpose Cooperative Ltd.			
Radio Annapurna FM	93.4	Kaski				
Pokhara FM	95.8	Kaski				
Voice of Youth FM	96.8	Kaski				
Image FM	97.9	Kaski	Image Channel Pvt. Ltd.			
Radio Kantipur FM	101.8	Kaski	Kantipur FM Pvt. Ltd.			
Radio Barahi FM	99.2	Kaski	Barahi Prasharan Pvt. Ltd.			
Radio Sarangkot	104.6	Kaski	Sarangkot Multi Purpose Cooperative Ltd.			
Radio Nepal	100	Kathmandu	Radio Nepal			
Radio Adhyatma Jyoti	104.8	Kathmandu	FM Adhyatma Jyoti Pvt Ltd.		Spiritual and infotainment	
Metro FM	94.6	Kathmandu	Kathmandu Metropolitan City Government			
Hits FM	91.2	Kathmandu	Hits Nepal Pvt. Ltd.			
Radio Upatyaka	87.6	Kathmandu	Narayan Pariwar Club			
Radio Mirmire	89.4	Kathmandu	Mechi Kali Sanchar Pvt. Ltd.			
Nepal FM	91.8	Kathmandu	Rainbow FM Pvt. Ltd.			
KEEPS FM	98.3	Kathmandu	Keeps Media Consult Pvt. Ltd			
Capital FM	92.4	Kathmandu	Malijarjun FM Pvt. Ltd.			
Gorkha FM	93.0	Kathmandu	British Gorkha Media Network Pvt. Ltd.			
HBC FM	94.0	Kathmandu	Himalaya Broadcasting Company Pvt. Ltd.			
Star FM	95.2	Kathmandu	Radio Broadcasting Services Development Committee			
Radio City	98.8	Kathmandu	National Broadcasting Pvt. Ltd.			
Maitri FM	99.4	Kathmandu	Bhassara Vision Pvt. Ltd.			
Classic FM	101.2	Kathmandu				
Radio Filmy	101.8	Kathmandu	Gopi Krishna Movies Pvt. Ltd.			
Image FM	97.9	Kathmandu	Image Channel Pvt Ltd			
CJMC Radio	106.0	Kathmandu	College of Journalism and Mass Communication			
Newa FM	106.6	Kathmandu	Newar Cultural Center			
TU FM	107.0	Kathmandu	Tribhuvan University			
ABC News Radio	100.6	Kathmandu				
Radio Audio	106.3	Kathmandu				
Radio Namobuddha	106.7	Kavre	Jugal Association Nepal			
Radio ABC	89.8	Kavre	Araniko Broadcasting Community Radio			
BBC Radio	103.0	Lalitpur	BBC World Service			
Ujyaalo FM	90.0	Lalitpur	Communication Corner Pvt. Ltd.			
Times FM	90.6	Lalitpur	Valley FM Pvt. Ltd.			
Radio Sagarmatha	102.4	Lalitpur	Nepal Forum of Environmental Journalist			
Radio Kantipur FM	96.1	Lalitpur	Kantipur FM Pvt. Ltd.			
Radio Appan Mithila	106.6	Mahottari	Grameen Samudayik Bikash Sewa Parishad			
Palung FM	107.2	Makwanpur	Palung Multipurpose Cooperative			
Birat FM	91.2	Morang	Birat Shree Media Network Pvt. Ltd.			
Koshi FM	94.3	Morang				
Saptakoshi FM	105.6	Morang				
Sky FM	106.6	Morang				
Vijaya FM	101.6	Nawalpur	Vijaya Community Information and Communications Cooperative Society Ltd.			
Radio Madhya Bindu	101.0	Nawalpur	Samudayik Sachetna Tatha Sanchar Prathisthan			
Nuwakot FM	106.8	Nuwakot	Nepal Peace and Development Center			
Radio Okhaldhunga	107.6	Okhaldhunga				
Madan Pokhara FM	106.9	Palpa	Madan Pokhara Village Development Committee			
Radio Rampur	103.6	Palpa	Kaligandaki Community Development Center			
Shreenagar FM	93.2	Palpa				
Radio Paschimanchal	99.4	Palpa				
Muktinath FM	90.8	Palpa	Palpa Communication Cooperative Organization Ltd.			
Gadimai FM	91.4	Parsa	Bara Media Pvt. Ltd.			
Birgunj FM	99.0	Parsa	Parsa FM Pvt. Ltd			
Radio Parasi	90.2	Parasi	Parasi Suchana Tatha Sanchar Sahakari Ltd.			
Butwal FM	94.4	Rupandehi				
Radio Lumbini FM	96.8	Rupandehi	Lumbini Information and Communication Cooperative Ltd.			
Tinau FM	98.2	Rupandehi				
Rupandehi FM	99.2	Rupandehi	Save the Environment Movement			
Radio Kantipur FM	96.1	Rupandehi	Kantipur FM Pvt. Ltd.			
Fulbari Community Radio	105.4	Siraha	Grameen Mahila Bachat Tatha Rin Sahakai Sanstha Ltd.			
Solu FM	102.2	Solukhumbu	Young Star Club			
Star FM	95.6	Sunsari				
Vijayapur FM	98.8	Vijayapur Media Group Pvt. Ltd.	Sunsari			
Bulbule FM	103.4	Surkhet	Bulbule Sanchar Kendra			
Bheri FM	106.4	Surkhet	Bheri Multi Purpose Cooperative Organization Ltd.			
Damauli FM	94.2	Tanahun	Tanahun Sanchar Sahakari Sanstha Ltd.			
Bhimad FM	100.9	Bhimad, Tanahun	Bhimad FM Pvt. Ltd.			
Radio Chhimkeshwori	106.2	Tanahun	Chhimkeshwori samudayik Bikash Tatha Sanchar Kendra Tanahun			
Power FM	95.6	Tanahun	Chhimkeshwori Media House Pvt. Ltd.			
Lamjung FM	88.8	lamjung				
Marshyandi FM	95.0	lamjung				
