= Phurba Sherpa =

Nepalese filmmaker, television director and producer

- फुर्वा शेर्पा
- Occupations: Filmmaker, television director, television producer
- Years active: 2008–present

Phurba Sherpa (Nepali: फुर्वा शेर्पा) is a Nepalese filmmaker, television director and producer who has worked in Nepal’s broadcast and media industry since 2008. He is known for directing television programs, reality shows, documentaries and music-based productions, including the television talk show Tamasoma Jyotirgamaya and the reality music competition Band Champion Nepal.

== Early life and education ==
Phurba Sherpa was born in Nepal. He received formal training in digital filmmaking, completing a diploma in Digital Filmmaking from the SAE Institute in Australia. He also studied business administration, combining creative media production with management education.

== Career ==
Sherpa began his professional career in television in 2008, initially working with Nepal Television. In 2009, he joined TTV, where he directed multiple entertainment and reality-based television programs. Over the years, he has worked across television, documentary, music video and corporate media formats as a director and producer.

=== Television and media work ===
Sherpa has directed several television programs, including Cyber Sansaar, a technology-focused television show, and Little Champs, a reality television program featuring young performers. He also directed the television special The Flop Show.

He served as the director of the music reality television program Band Champion Nepal, which aired nationally in Nepal. He additionally directed Idea Studio Nepal (Season 5), a business-oriented reality television series.

=== Tamasoma Jyotirgamaya ===
Sherpa produced and directed the television talk show Tamasoma Jyotirgamaya, which was filmed at Everest Base Camp at an altitude of 5,550 metres. The program was included by the World Book of Records, London, for being filmed at high altitude.

=== Music and record recognition ===
According to the World Book of Records, London, Sherpa was also recognized for creating a song using a single Devanagari letter, with the recognition ceremony conducted at Everest Base Camp.

== Journalism ==
Sherpa has also contributed opinion and feature articles as a writer to OnlineKhabar English, the English-language edition of Nepal-based digital news platform OnlineKhabar.

== Filmography ==
All credits listed below are sourced from IMDb.

=== Television ===
- Band Champion Nepal (2022) – director.
- Tamasoma Jyotirgamaya – producer and director.
- The Flop Show – director.
- Little Champs – director.
- Cyber Sansaar – director.
- Idea Studio Nepal (Season 5) – director.
- AP Bahas – director.

=== Documentary and film ===
- Breathless: The World’s Highest Race – director.
- Operation Valentine (2024) – line producer.
