= Palpasa Café =

Book by Narayan Wagle

Palpasa Cafe
- Author: Narayan Wagle
- Original title: पल्पसा क्याफे
- Translator: Bikash Sangraulaa
- Language: Nepali
- Genre: Novel
- Publisher: Nepalaya (Kathmandu, Nepal)
- Publication date: 2005
- Publication place: Nepal
- Media type: Print
- ISBN: 978-9-93-780210-9

Palpasa Cafe (Nepali:पल्पसा क्याफे) is a novel by Nepali author Narayan Wagle. It tells the story of an artist Drishya during the height of the Nepalese Civil War. The novel is partly a love story of Drishya and the first generation American Nepali, Palpasa, who has returned to the land of her parents after 9/11. It is often called an anti-war novel, and describes the effects of the civil war on the Nepali countryside that Drishya travels to.

The book has been a best-seller in Nepal, creating a sales record for a Nepali book of 25,000 copies in the first year. It was Wagle's first book. Since its release, the book has received many honours including the highly prestigious literary award in Nepal, the Madan Puraskar. After Palpasa Cafe, Wagle has written another best-selling book, Mayur Times.

The book was written originally in Nepali and was later translated into English and Korean. The book has sold over 52,000 copies as of July 2012. Palpasa Cafe has officially become the first Nepali novel available in Kindle, it also comes in various portable and ebook formats like mobi and pdf.

== Synopsis ==
The novel begins with Narayan Wagle waiting for his friend Drishya. Wagle tells that he is writing about Drishya who is an artist living in Kathmandu and has an ambitious idea to build a cafe in his village during the time when civil war is still going on. While waiting he learns that Drishya is kidnapped by "security personnel". Learning that the protagonist of his book has just been kidnapped, he is stunned and starts to contemplate his fate and the fate of Nepal.

The story of Drishya starts in Goa where he meets Palpasa, a Nepalese girl aspiring to become a documentary maker who has just returned from US. They have immediate connection but they both decide go their own way. Drishya returns to Kathmandu where he continues his art work in his studio. He reaches a small library with collection of old books for research where he meets Palpasa again. They both start meeting together and the attraction is undeniable.

Later Drishya is visited by Siddhartha, his friend from college. Siddhartha says that he is a Maoist in hiding and asks for shelter. He invites him in and they start talking about the state of Nepal. Drishya asks if the violence is justified even if their cause is good and Siddhartha replies that the violence was first started by the state and all the violence is justifiable for the greater good. They can't reach to an agreement so Siddhartha challenges Drishya to "see" what Nepal is like. Drishya accepts and then visits the western hill villages.

He meets a girl who is about to join Maoist on Siddhartha's insistence that she is going to become part of greater revolution. On reaching his village he meets Laure Kaka whose daughter is now a Maoist fighter and he doesn't know where his son is. Kaka tells him how his village could be made prosperous and he himself is farming coffee. He leaves the village and shares the walk with some foreigners who have built a school on his way to district headquarter. There he stays in a lodge and almost dies in a Maoist attack. He leaves the next day to go to his Mit's home where he learns that he has died and his Mitba and Mitama don't want him around as he reminds of their son.

Then he decides to return to Kathmandu as he has "understood his country" but wants to meet Siddhartha before he returns but mistakenly causes Siddhartha's death by pointing him out. Guilt ridden Drishya catches a bus back to Kathmandu where he finds Palpasa by his side who is also on her way back after her attempt to make documentary. Then both are glad that they met each other and try to talk about his abrupt leave from Kathmandu and the journey both of them had after that. Palpasa is killed in the bus explosion which Drishya survives as he had stepped outside.

Drishya returns to Kathmandu but is haunted by Palpasa for a long time. He starts painting a series of paintings titled Palpasa which helps him get some peace. He then continues in his life as an artist running with the dream to go back to his village to build the 'Palpasa Cafe'. Some people who claim to be security personnel come to visit him and force him to go along with them and his story ends there.

In the epilogue, Wagle has just completed his book. A girl called Gemini who asks him to help find her lost friend. He is not sure how he can help and on asking more about who her friend is, he discovers that it is Palpasa. He informs her that she is not coming back and he knows it because he wrote a book about her. He hands her the draft if she wanted to read with the title 'Palpasa Cafe'.

== Characters ==
- Drishya: The main character, a 32 years old male. His name literally means 'view'. He is an artist living in Kathmandu, originally from an unnamed village in western hills Nepal. He is also the author of a fictional book that remains unnamed which is Palpasa's favorite book.
- Palpasa: The love interest of Drishya. She is a Nepali woman who lived and studied in USA who has returned to Nepal and aspires to become a documentary film maker
- Siddhartha: An old friend of Drishya from college. He is a Maoist in hiding and asks Drishya for shelter.
- Christina: Interested in Drishya. She is the one who tells him that his 'paintings look cold' and also after some time tells him that the reason was the colour of the wall in his paintings.
- Narayan Wagle: The author of the novel who is also a character in the prologue and epilogue. He is a friend of Drishya.
- Gemini: A friend of Palpasa from USA. She wants Wagle's help to find missing Palpasa.
- Tshering: A friend of Drishya.

== Style ==
The novel is written in thirty chapters, including a prologue and an epilogue. The prologue and epilogue are in Narayan Wagle's self-inserted POV while the rest of the twenty-eight chapters are in Drishya's POV.

== See also ==
- Radha (novel)
- Khalangama Hamala
- Karnali Blues
