= Shyam Goenka =

Nepali newspaper founder (born March 1963)

Shyam Goenka (born 7 March 1963 in Janakpur) is the founder of Nepal's first broadsheets in the Non-Government sector, christened Kantipur and The Kathmandu Post. He is an advocate for the free press and fordemocratization in Nepal.

== Kantipur ==
In February 1993, following constitutional changes in Nepal that allowed for a free press, Shyam Goenka founded Kanipur and The Kathmandu Post at the age of 27. The newspapers were established as part of an early private-sector initiative in Nepal's print media industry.

Reports indicate that both publications gained readership rapidly after their launch and became among the most widely circulated newspapers in Nepal during the 1990s. Their emergence marked a shift in the country's media landscape, which had previously been dominated by state-owned publications.

Despite its success, Kantipur was not being given any government advertisements, something that was crucial for sustenance of the newspaper. Thus, due to financial crisis and in order to prevent the employees from losing their jobs, Shyam Goenka ended up transferring his shares to Binod Gyawali and Kailash Sirohiya of the Namaste Group, hereby, handing over the reigns of the media house to them and renouncing ownership of Kantipur and The Kathmandu Post therein.

Following the establishment of Shyam Goenka and Kantipur, private sector print media in Nepal gained a status previously held by the government-owned Gorkhapatra and The Rising Nepal. Kantipur and The Kathmandu Post have been involved in the development of journalism and democratic processes in Nepal. Journalism has become a chosen profession for literate youth in the country.

== See also ==
- Kantipur Publications
- Kantipur
- The Kathmandu Post
- Narayan Wagle
