= Bagaha Copperplate inscription =

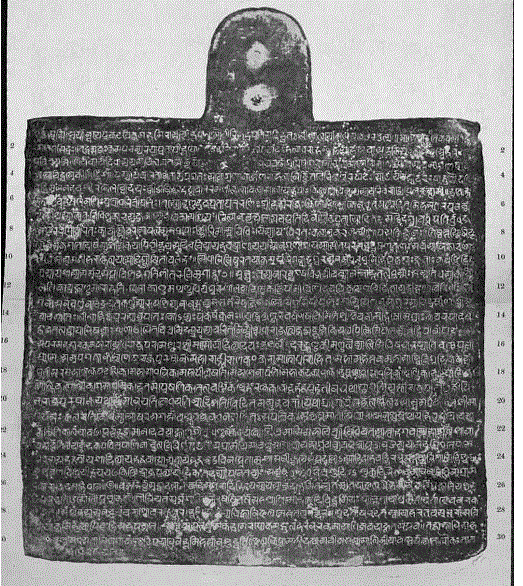
Bagaha Copperplate Inscription of King Suryaditya, 1020 CE.

The Bagaha Copperplate inscription is a documented record of donation of a village inscribed on a copper plate in 1020 CE. This was commissioned during the rule of King Suryaditya. It is one of the earliest known documented found written in Sanskrit. Moreover, this early Medieval Indian inscription is one of the oldest copperplate obtained in the northern region of India. This was obtained from Bagaha, West Champaran, Bihar by S. V. Sohni in 1962.

== Description ==
This inscription is written in 33 rows. Copperplate size is 39.8 cm (Width) x 38.5 (length). The inscription is written in Sanskrit language with the ancient style of Devanagari script. Two lines are inscribed at the backside of the copperplate.

This copperplate inscription describes about a land donation that was commissioned by King Suryaditya, who was descended of King Mālyaketu. From the details of inscription it is known that the name of King Suryaditya's father was King Hansarāja and grandfather was King Helarājā Vārāha. It is mentioned that the king had donated the village named Vanapalli to a Brahmin named Yaśāditya. According to inscription, the village of Vanapallī is located in the region named Vyālisi-viṣya, which is located in the zone named Darda-Gandaki Maṇḍala. A Brahmin named Yaśāditya, the recipient of this donation, is said to be born in Sāvarṇya gotra (clan) and is son of Vaṭṭho and grandson Āḍavi. They were native residents of a village named Usiya and originally belonged to a village named Cela. The day of donation is mentioned as Friday, the 14th day of the bright fortnight of first lunar month of Chaitra in Vikram Samvat 1077. As per the gregorian calendar this date corresponds to 11 March 1020 CE.

== Geographical place-names identified in inscription ==
From this copper it is evident that in the 10th century this region was named as Darad-Gandaki. The Sanskrit word darad means 'mountain'. At present, the area of Bagaha is located on the banks of Gandaki in the lowland region of the Himalayas, so it is natural for the area to be called Darad-Gaṇḍakī Maṇḍala in the 10th century.

The inscription mentions a Brahmin named Yashaditya as the recipient of a donated village named Vañapalli. The Sanskrit word palli means ‘a small village’. At present, the area of Bagaha has the only forest sanctuary called Valmiki Tiger Reserve located in Valmiki Nagar area. There are many small villages still existing within the forest area of Valmiki Nagar. It is possible that one of such villages was given in donation.

The term vyālisi-viṣaya mentioned in this inscription appears to be an administrative term. It might be an under which forty two administrative units were governed. In the textual sources of medieval India, the Darad-Gandaki Maṇḍala was mentioned in various scriptures and pilgrim-related texts under the name of Tīra-bhukti (current name Tirhut). As the rivers used to play an important role in the identification and naming of a place in ancient times, Tīra-bhukti was the region of western shore of Gandaki river, which was expanded till its confluence with the Ganges, at present day Sonpur in Vaishali district of Bihar. As this area was located (Skt. bhukta) on the banks (Skt. tīra) of the Gandaki, its name was given Tīra-bhukti. The present name of this region, Tirhut, is Apabhraṃśa of its Sanskrit name Tīra-bhukti.

== Linguistic description of the place-names and peoples-name mentioned in the inscription ==
In this copperplate inscription:

- The name of recipient Brahmin (Yaśāditya), the donor king (Suryaditya) and the name of king's ancestors (Mālyaketu, Helarājā Vārāha, Hansarāj) are mentioned in Sanskrit.
- The names of ancestors of the recipient Brahmin (Āḍvaī, Vaṭṭho) are in Prakrit.
- Details of the places-names related to the donated village (Vanapallī, Vyālisi-viṣya, Darda-Ganḍki Maṇḍala) are in Sanskrit.
- The names of the places related to the residence (Usiya, Cela) of the recipient Brahmin are in Prakrit.

== Other local references ==
According to the genealogical records of the villagers of Pathkauli village, located in Bagaha, West Champaran, Bihar, in the 12th century, this area was governed by low local Brahmin brothers, Damodar Pathak and Bhupal Pathak. Their mortuary shrines are still under worship at Braham Stan of Pathkauli and at Rajgadhi shrine in the village of Naurangia, near Valmiki Nagar. People of Tharu community worship the shrine of Bhupal Pathak as chaurā, a small mound built of mud.

== Sources ==
- Sircar, D.C., 'Copper-plate Grants from Bihar', Epigraphia Indica, XXXV, 1962–63, pp. 130–35.
- Sahai, Bhagwant, The Inscriptions of Bihar (From earliest times to the middle of 13th Century), Ramanand Vidya Bhavan, Patna, 1983, 127-29.
