= Prashant Aryal =

Nepali journalist

- Aryal in Kantipur Day 2015
- Born: Kailali, Nepal
- Occupation(s): Editor-in-chief, Galaxy 4K Television
- Years active: 1993 – Present

Prashant Aryal (Nepali: प्रशान्त अर्याल) is a journalist based in Kathmandu, who was the editor-in-chief of Kantipur Television Network. He was previously the Editor-in-Chief of Nepal Magazine through the years 2008-2018. After his recent incumbency as the Editor-in-chief at Galaxy 4K TV ended, he now works as a freelancer.

== Early life and career ==
He was born in Kailali and started his journalism career in 1993 with Suruchi weekly. In August 2008, he was appointed as the Editor of Chief of Nepal Magazine succeeding Sudheer Sharma. He has worked with Himal Khabarpatrika, Kantipur and Pro Public among others in the past. He has BA in Journalism and MA in Sociology and Anthropology from Tribhuvan University.

== Awards ==
He is the recipient of Govinda Biyogi Journalism Award- 2017 and Lilaram-Kuntidevi Neupane Journalism Award-2014.
