= Bhishan Dinharu =

Memoir of a Maoist spy in Nepal

- Author: Nabin Jirel
- Original title: भीषण दिनहरु
- Language: Nepali
- Subject: War Memoir
- Publisher: Publication Nepalaya
- Publication date: 23 May 2013
- Publication place: Nepal
- Pages: 232
- ISBN: 9789937874014

Bhishan Dinharu (Nepali भिषण दिनहरु) is a memoir of a Maoist spy who operated during the Maoist insurgency in Nepal.

The book was launched along with Radha Paudel's war memoir Khalangama Hamala 23 May 2013.
