= Nari (magazine) =

Monthly women's magazine published in Nepal

- 2076 Magh Issue (c. 2076 January)
- Editor: Upasana Ghimire
- Categories: Women's magazine
- Frequency: Monthly
- Format: Magazine
- Circulation: 86,000
- Publisher: Kailash Sirohiya
- Founded: 2002
- Company: Kantipur Publications
- Country: Nepal
- Based in: Kathmandu
- Language: Nepali
- Website: narimag.com.np

Nari (Nepali: नारी) is a monthly women's magazine published nationally in Nepal by Kantipur Publications, a private media company based in Kathmandu.

== History and profile ==
The magazine was started as Sarbottam in 2002. Two years later it was renamed Sarbottam Nari. The magazine is part of Kantipur Publications. It is published in Nepali on a monthly basis. It is also published to the Nepali diaspora in Hong Kong, Malaysia, Japan and Australia. Upasana Ghimire is the editor of Nari Magazine. This Monthly Women's Magazine has circulation of 86,000 copies.

== See also ==
- Kantipur
- Nepali Times
- Republica
