= Shova Gyawali =

Nepali publisher

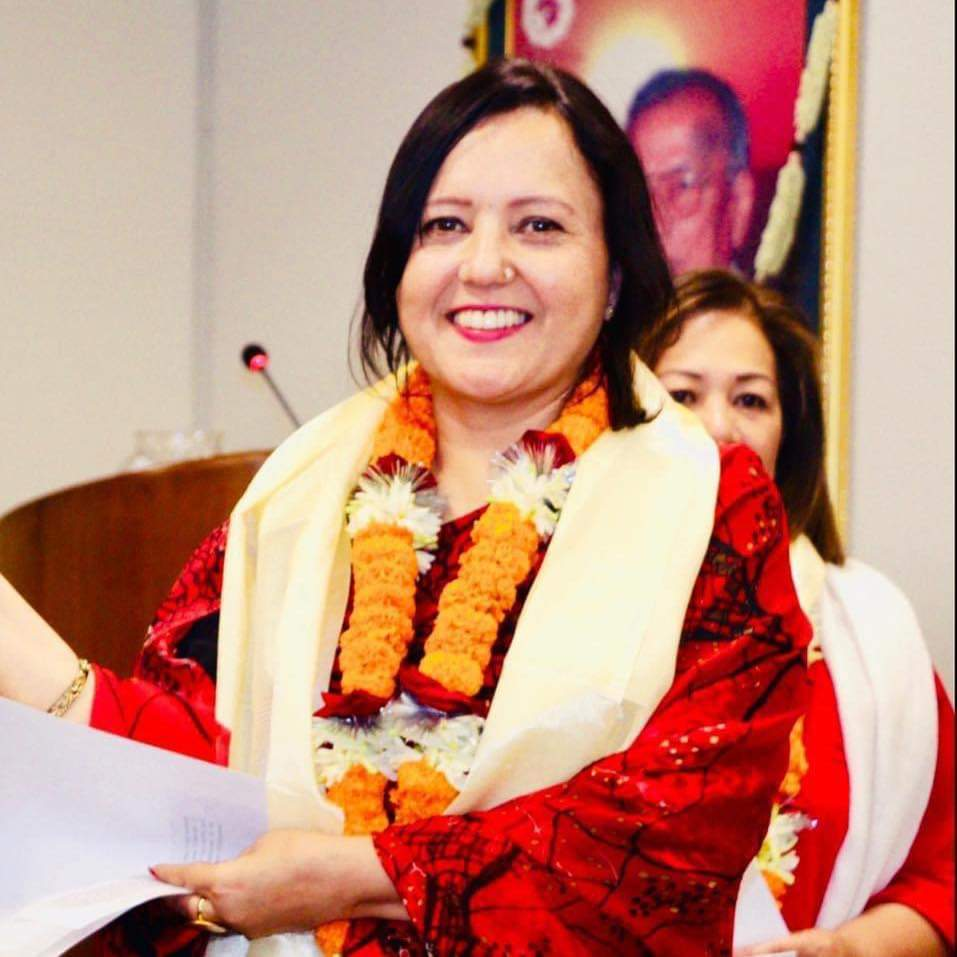

Shova Gyawali (Nepali: शोभा ज्ञवाली ) is a publisher, author and media owner of Nepal Republic Media Pvt. Ltd. She is Chairperson of Startup Summit Nepal.

Likewise, she is the Immediate Past President of the Federation of Women Entrepreneurs Association of Nepal (FWEAN). Additionally, she is a Life Member and Executive Committee Member of SAARC CCI, as well as an Executive Member of Chambers of Commerce and Industry that promote bilateral economic activities between Nepal and Australia (NACCI), Brazil, and India (NBCCI).

Ms. Shova Gyawali is a strong advocate for women entrepreneurs and youth living in rural and remote communities. She believes that economic transformation begins at the grassroots level and that entrepreneurship serves as a powerful pathway to financial independence, dignity, and social inclusion. Through her work, she strives to connect local entrepreneurs with national institutions, development partners, and international markets, while promoting local production, value addition, and the growth of “Made in Nepal” enterprises. Her commitment lies in empowering communities through entrepreneurship and creating sustainable economic opportunities for all.
