= Vijayapur FM =

- Dharan, Sunsari Nepal; Nepal
- Broadcast area: Sunsari, Morang, Dhankuta, Udayapur
- Frequency: 98.8 MHz

Programming
- Language: Nepali,

Ownership
- Owner: Vijayapur Media Group Pvt. Ltd.

Technical information
- Power: 1000W

Links
- Website: www.vijayapurfm.com

Vijaypur FM 98.8 MHz is a radio station in Nepal, based in Dharan, Sunsari District. It is owned and operated by Vijayapur Media Group. This is one of the top radio stations in the eastern parts of Nepal. "Our Radio, Our Voice" is the motto of the station. Its mission was to provide its listeners with audio content that met both their entertainment and information needs. A variety of music, entertainment, sports, and news programs are a part of the station's programming. Online streaming is available from Vijayapur FM worldwide. With a capacity of 1000 watts, it broadcasts on 98.8 MHz frequency (FM). It is equipped with a transmitter antenna located at a height of 35 meters above the ground.

== See also ==
- List of FM radio stations in Nepal
