= Mahendra Sherchan =

Nepali politician (1953–2021)

Honourable Mahendra Sherchan
- महेन्द्र शेरचन

Member of Constituent Assembly for CPN UML Proportional representation
- President: Bidhya Devi Bhandari
- Prime Minister: KP Sharma Oli
- In office 19 November 2013 – 13 October 2017

Personal details
- Born: 18 November 1953 Nepal
- Died: 21 August 2021 (aged 67) Kathmandu, Nepal
- Party: CPN UML

Mahendra Sherchan (Nepali: महेन्द्र शेरचन; 18 Nov 1953 - 19 Aug 2021) was a Nepalese politician and founder of Rajdhani national daily. He served as a Member of the 2nd Constituent Assembly of Nepal from 2013 to 2017. He was elected in 2013 Nepalese Constituent Assembly election through the proportional representation from Communist Party of Nepal.

== Controversy ==
In 2012, Sherchan was sentenced to two months in jail and fined Rs 5,000 by the Labor Court for failing to comply with a labor dispute ruling involving journalist Ram Prasad Dahal.

== Death ==
Sherchan died on 19 Aug 2021 from COVID-19 during treatment at Nepal APF Hospital.
