= Pathak =

Pathak (Devanagari: पाठक) is a surname native to India and Nepal. Pathak is mainly used by Hindu Brahmin communities of North India, East India, Nepal and Western India.

Notable people with the surname Pathak include:

- Amit Pathak (born 1972), former first-class cricketer
- Amita Pathak, Indian actress
- Arun Pathak (born 1975), Indian politician and social activist
- Arun Pathak (Bihar politician) advisor to the Governor of Bihar
- Arun Pathak (Uttar Pradesh politician) (born 1973), Indian politician, social activist and teacher
- Brajesh Pathak (born 1964), Indian politician
- Bindeshwar Pathak (1943-2023), Indian sociologist
- Chirag Pathak (born 1987) first-class cricketer
- Dil Bhusan Pathak (born 1972) Investigative Broadcaster and Media Advocate
- Dina Pathak (1922–2002), Indian actor and director
- Falguni Pathak (born 1964), Indian singer
- Gangadhar Pathak (1923–?), Indian writer, poet and historian
- Gopal Swarup Pathak (1896–1982), Vice President of India (1969–1974)
- Harin Pathak (born 1947), Indian politician
- Heera Pathak (1916–1995), Indian poet, literary critic, and wife of Ramnarayan
- Krishan Pathak (born 1997), field hockey goalkeeper for the Indian national side
- Mohit Pathak, music director, singer and lyricist
- N. R. Pathak (1915–1985), Indian humanitarian, social worker, and politician
- Parag Pathak (born 1980), Nepalese-American academic
- Pashchim Pathak (born 1976), Indian Cricket umpire
- Prashant Pathak, Indo-Canadian investor, businessman and philanthropist
- Punit Pathak (born 1986), dancer, choreographer and actor
- Raghunandan Swarup Pathak (1924–2007), Chief Justice of India
- Ramnarayan V. Pathak (1887–1955), Indian poet, short story writer, and literary critic
- Rameshwar Pathak (1938-2010), Indian singer
- Ratna Pathak (born 1963), Indian actress
- Riti Pathak (born 1977) is a member of the Lower House of Parliament in India from Sidhi in Madhya Pradesh who belongs to Bharatiya Janata Party
- Ritu Pathak (born 1987), Bollywood playback singer
- Sabitri Bogati (Pathak), Nepalese politician
- Sandeep Pathak, Indian politician and Rajya Sabha member
- Sandeep Pathak, cinema and theatre actor
- Sankaet Pathak, Indian-American businessman
- Sanjay Pathak (born 1970), Indian former politician
- Shanta Pathak (1927–2010), British businesswoman
- Shivam Pathak, singer-songwriter
- Shruti Pathak, playback singer
- Shyam Pathak, Indian actor
- Subrat Pathak (born 1979), Bharatiya Janata Party politician, elected to the Lok Sabha in the 2019 Indian general election .
- Supriya Pathak (born 1961), Indian actress
- Surender Mohan Pathak (born 1940), Indian author
- V. S. Pathak (1926–2003), Indian historian and writer
- Vandana Pathak, film, stage and TV actress
- Vijay Bahadur Pathak, Indian politician
- Vinay Kumar Pathak, Vice Chancellor of Dr A.P.J.Abdul Kalam University, Lucknow
- Vinay Pathak (born 1968), Indian actor
