= Jumla: A Nurse's Story =

2013 memoir by Radha Paudel

- Cover page
- Author: Radha Paudel
- Original title: खलंगामा हमला (Khalangama Hamala)
- Cover artist: Mohan Mainali
- Language: Nepali
- Subject: Maoist insurgency in Nepal
- Publisher: Nepalaya
- Publication date: 23 May 2013
- Publication place: Nepal
- Pages: 135
- Awards: Madan Puraskar
- ISBN: 9789937874007
- Followed by: Apabitra Ragat

Jumla: A Nurse's Story (Original title: Khalangama Hamala; Nepali: खलंगामा हमला, lit. 'Attack on Khalanga') is a 2013 Nepali war memoir by Radha Paudel. Paudel worked as health worker written during the Maoist insurgency in Jumla district in mid-western region of Nepal. It was published on May 23, 2013, by Nepa~laya publication. It won the Madan Puraskar which is the most recognized literary award in Nepal.

== Synopsis ==
Radha Poudel left her government job as a nurse in Chitwan and went to Jumla for a safe maternity program. While analyzing the social and health problems of Karnali, she herself became the victim of armed conflict on the night of the attack on the Maoist headquarters. The program was over but her stay in Jumla did not. She continued social activism in the region. She has been awarded the 'Women Peacemaker 2012' by the University of San Diego and the 'N-Peace Award 2012' by the United Nations Development Program (UNDP).

== Reception ==
The book won the Madan Puraskar for the year 2013.

== Translations ==
The book was translated into English as Jumla: A Nurse's Story jointly by Dev Paudel and Ishan Gurung.

== See also ==
- Antarmanko Yatra
- Bhishan Dinharu
- Singha Durbarko Ghumne Mech
- Palpasa Café
- Chhapamar ko Chhoro
