= Ram Bahadur Rawal =

- रामबहादुर रावल

Press Advisor to Prime Minister of Nepal
- In office 12 January 2026 – Present
- Prime Minister: Sushila Karki

Press Co-ordinator to Prime Minister of Nepal
- In office 15 October 2025 – 12 January 2026
- Prime Minister: Sushila Karki

Personal details
- Born: 11 December 1983 (age 42) Martadi, Bajura, Nepal
- Education: Tribhuvan University
- Occupation: Journalist, Communications advisor

Ram Bahadur Rawal is a Nepali journalist and Communication Advisor. He has served since October 2025 in the Secretariat of Prime Minister of Nepal Sushila Karki as her key communication aide, serving first as Press Co-ordinator and later as Press Advisor.

== Career ==
He has spent over two decades in Nepali journalism working across different media platforms. Most of his career spreads across magazine journalism and in Television.‍ During Nepal's post-war political transition, he was with Nepal Magazine, where he wrote dozens of cover stories on Nepal's peace process and fragile politics surrounding constitution making. Prior to joining the Prime Minister's team, he was the editor of NepalKhabar, a Nepali news portal. He earlier worked with Kantipur Television and Galaxy 4K TV. He has also worked with Nepal FM 91.8 Radio, Drishti weekly.
He was beaten up by Nepal army personnel during the Maoist insurgency in 2005 while reporting the traditional Deuda Dance in his home district Bajura and sustained injuries on his head and eyes according to a report by Federation of Nepali Journalist (FNJ).

== Awards ==
- The Legal Journalism award-2016 by Nepal Bar Association.
