= Himalmedia =

Himalmedia (pl) हिमालमिडिया (प्रा. लि.)
- Status: Active
- Country of origin: Nepal
- Headquarters location: Patan Dhoka, Lalitpur
- Distribution: Nepal and 30 other countries
- Key people: Ambica Shrestha; Kanak Mani Dixit; Kunda Dixit
- Publication types: Periodicals
- Nonfiction topics: News and analysis
- Imprints: Himal Khabarpatrika; Nepali Times; Wave
- Official website: himalmedia.com

Himalmedia Private Limited (Nepali: हिमालमिडिया प्राइभेट लिमिटेड) is a periodical publisher in Nepal. Himalmedia publishes three premium periodicals: Himal Khabarpatrika, a Nepali-language fortnightly newsmagazine, Nepali Times, an English-language weekly newspaper, and Wave, also an English-language magazine aimed at teenagers.
