= Radio Kantipur =

Radio station in Nepal

- Nepal
- Frequencies: 96.1 MHz (East/Central); 101.8 MHz (West)

Ownership
- Owner: Kantipur Media Group

History
- Founded: October 1998
- Former names: Kantipur FM

Links
- Webcast: radiokantipur.com/live; www.livefms.net/2011/06/kantipur-fm.html
- Website: radiokantipur.com

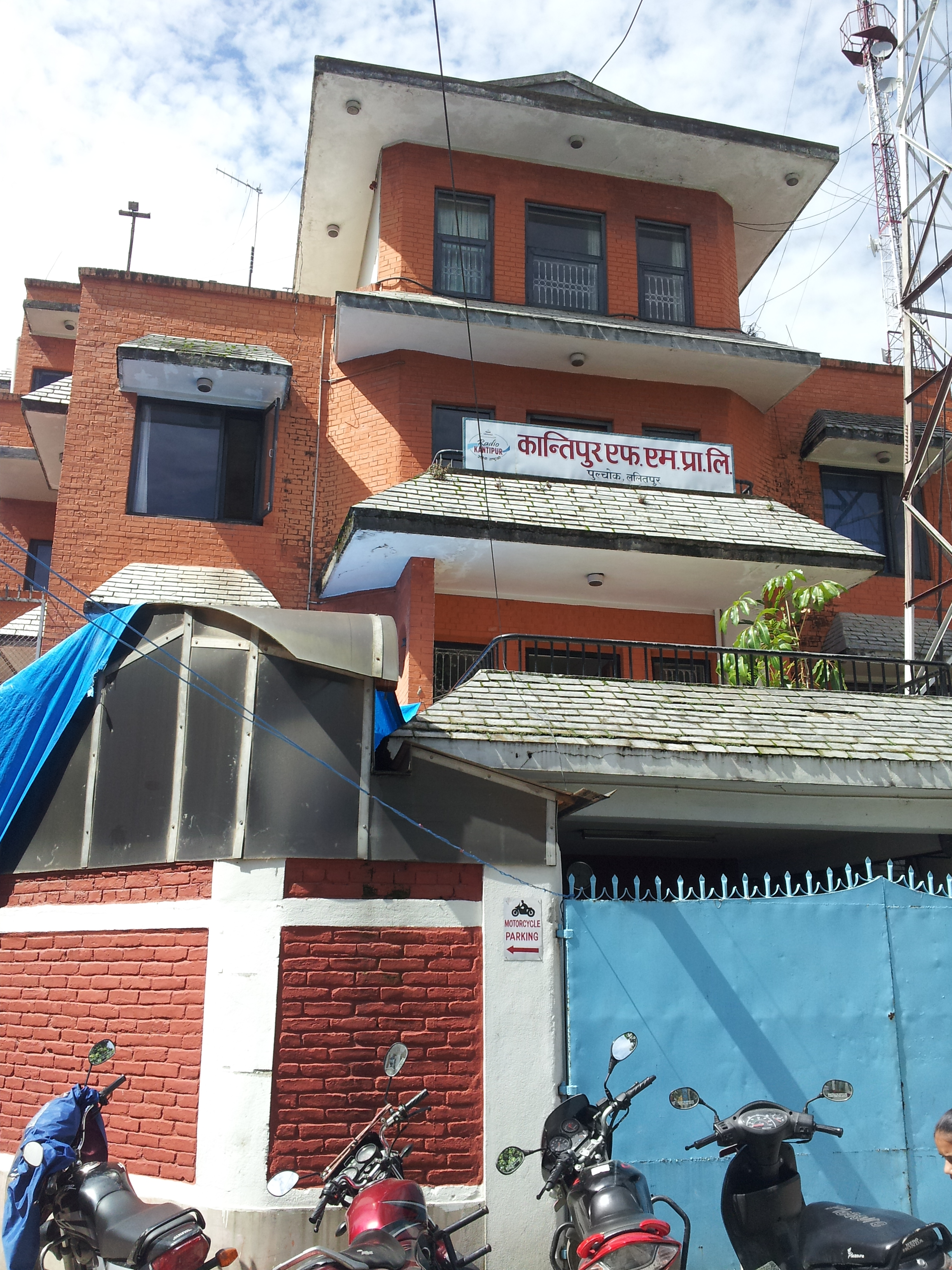
Studio building of Kantipur FM

Radio Kantipur (Nepali: रेडियो कान्तिपुर) or Kantipur FM (Nepali: कान्तिपुर एफ. एम.) is a Nepalese FM radio station, established in October 1998. It currently operates in the eastern, central, western, mid-western and far-western development regions. It is most popular in eastern region and in Kathmandu. It provides news and entertainment programs 24 hours a day. In 2007 it started nationwide transmission on two frequencies – 96.1 MHz in the east and central regions and 101.8 MHz in the west. Additionally, it is available via the internet at www.radiokantipur.com/live .

== Relay Stations ==
- 96.1 in Kathmandu
- 96.1 in Bhedetar Dhankuta
- 96.1 in Birgunj, Parsa
- 96.1 in Bharatpur, Chitwan
- 96.1 in Bhairahawa, Rupandehi
- 101.8 in Nepalgunj, Banke
- 101.8 in Pokhara, Kaski
- 101.8 in Dhangadi, Kailali

== Availability ==
Kantipur FM programming is available online through these websites:

- Radio Kantipur Live

== See also ==
- Hits FM (Nepal)
