= Mayur Times =

Novel by Narayan Wagle

- Author: Narayan Wagle
- Language: Nepali
- Genre: Novel
- Publisher: Nepalaya (Kathmandu, Nepal)
- Publication date: 2010
- Publication place: Nepal
- Media type: Print
- ISBN: 9789937829007

Mayur Times is a novel by Nepali author Narayan Wagle. It tells the story of Parag and Lisara, two friends of different ethnicity from Parag's POV during the transitional period of Nepal. They both work for a Newspaper called Mayur Times.
