= Radio Rampur =

Community radio station in Rampur, Nepal

Radio Rampur रेडियो रामपुर
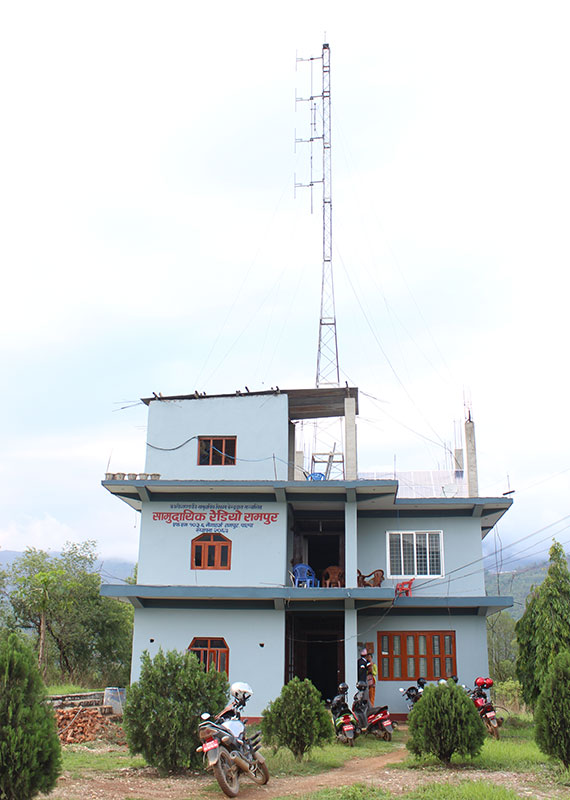
- Radio Rampur studios

Rampur; Nepal
- Broadcast area: Palpa, Syangja, Nawalparasi, Tanahun
- Frequency: 103.6 MHz

Programming
- Languages: Nepali, Magar

History
- First air date: November 12, 2006

Technical information
- ERP: 100 watts

Radio Rampur is a community radio in Rampur, Palpa District, Lumbini Zone, Nepal. It is founded by locals of Rampur Municipality. Sukadev Pokharel was the station manager at that moment. Bashudev Devkota is the founder chairman of this radio station. It is also a broadcasting partner of ACORAB and Ujyaalo 90 Network. Bashu Dhakal is the chief news editor. Sita Dotel is a news reader as well as a programmer.
