= Radha Paudel =

Nepalese nurse and writer

- राधा पौडेल
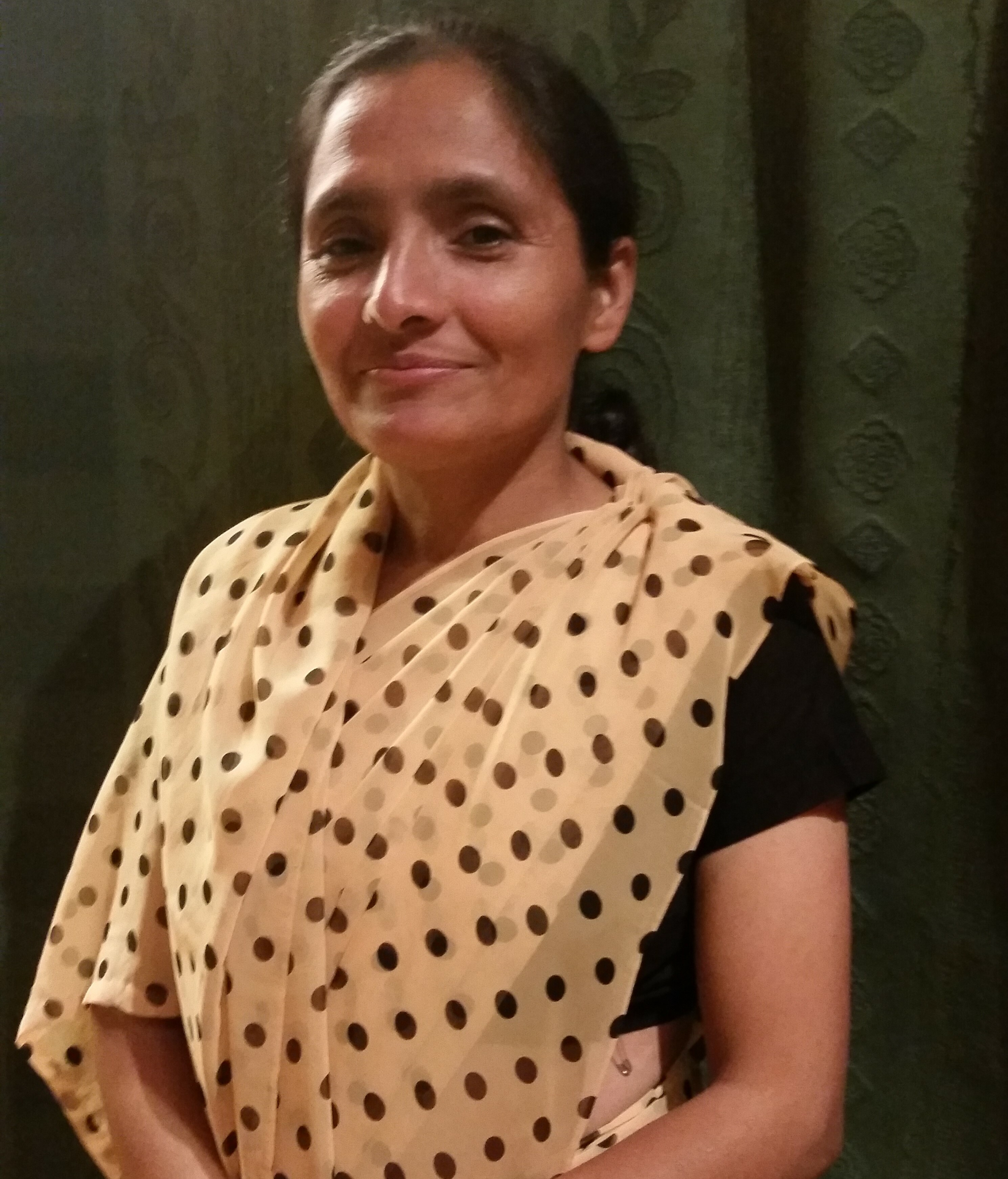
- Radha Paudel in Oslo, Norway
- Born: 29 December 1973 (age 52)
- Education: Doctor of Philosophy (PhD)- Faculty of Education at Tribhuvan University
- Alma mater: Tribhuvan University, Asian Institute of Management
- Relatives: Binu Kumari Regmi (Elder Sister); Bindu Paudyal Wasti (Elder Sister); Usha Paudyal (Elder Sister); Samjhana Poudel (Younger Sister); Kishore Poudel (Younger Brother)
- Website: www.dignifiedmenstruation.org www.radhapaudelfoundation.org

Dr. Radha Paudel (Nepali: राधा पौडेल) is a Nepalese an activist, author, and founder of Global South Coalition for Dignified Menstruation (GSCDM) who started her career as a nurse. She won the Madan Puraskar for her memoir Khalangama Hamala (English:A Nurse's Story, German :Eine Tochter Neplas in Aufbruch).

== Personal life ==
She was born on 29 December 1973 in Mangalpur village in Chitwan district of Nepal to father Devi Prasad Paudel and mother late Ganga Maya Paudel, and raised in Gauriganj, Bharatpur,Chitwan.

Born into a typical rural background in the Terai region of Nepal, Paudel's childhood was defined by poverty and the absence of modern amenities like electricity, television, etc. Far from experiencing the eliteness of life, her early years were shaped by the grueling realities of a bhakre gothalo (herder), where she spent her days fetching water, clearing livestock manure, and studying by the dim light of a homemade kerosene lantern crafted from an old ink bottle. Amidst these hardships, Paudel often felt isolated-a sense of being alone in a crowd-which eventually led her to internalize her struggles and channel her experiences into writing and intense study as a form of personal therapy and escape from the harsh reality of the society.

This baseline of deprivation was further compounded by deeply traumatic experiences surrounding Menstrual discrimination at the age of seven.

== Career ==
=== Pioneering Dignified Menstruation ===
Driven by her own experiences with menstrual discrimination, Paudel fundamentally shifted the global conversation around Menstruation that is Dignified Menstruation.

- She founded the global menstrual movement: Global South Coalition for Dignified Menstruation in 2019 to not only change the narratives around menstruation but also to reframe conventional definition of unequal power, patriarchy and exclusion.
- she founded a biodegradable menstrual pad factory in Bharatpur,Chitwan (Miteri Jaibik Pad ) in 2018 and empowering marginalized communities .

=== Groundbreaking Activism &Campaigns ===
- Public Transport Safety & Transit (2011): Conducted a landmark study and spearheaded a nationwide campaign targeting sexual harassment on public transportation.
- Accountability in Higher Education (2011): Led a high-profile movement against sexual abuse at Tribhuvan University, demanding safer academic spaces for female students.
- Intensively engage in national and international campaigns of Women in Peace and Politics, Gender Based Violence, Stop Rape Campaigns, Gender Responsive Constitution (constitution drafting process, constitutional assembly), Occupy Balwatar, Equal Citizenship right, Anti-corruption, Peace Vigils, Engaging Boys/Men, etc.

=== Crisis Leadership & Disaster Response ===
- 2015 Earthquake: Mobilized and intensively led teams of volunteers to provide immediate, hands-on relief to devastated communities.
- The Border Blockade (2015–2016): Traveled through the hardest-hit regions to initiate meaningful peace dialogues across critical hubs, including Lalbandhi, Sarlahi, Saptari, Dhanusa, Parsa, Chitwan, and Kathmandu.
- Flood Relief (2016–2017): Spearheaded continuous emergency relief operations for recurring flood victims in the Saptari, Siraha, Chitwan, Jumla, etc.

=== Institutional Leadership & Policy Influence ===
Paudel has lent her expertise as a leader, founder, executive, and advisor to dozens of organizations:

- Radha Paudel Foundation: After serving as a full-time Founder/Chair in Action Works Nepal(2010 to 2016), she transitioned her focus to the Radha Paudel Foundation in 2017(formally) aiming to theories Dignified Menstruation as an decolonial, holistic lifecycle approach for equality, inclusion and shattering patriarchy .
- Resolution Motion on Dignified Menstruation: Paudel advocate on urgency of resolution motion on Dignified Menstruation. National Assembly unanimously endorsed of it on 21 March 2025.
- Government Policy Expert (2021–2023): Appointed as an Expert Member for the Ministry of Women, Children and Senior Citizens (Government of Nepal), translating her decades of grassroots activism into structural national policy.
- Team Leader for a project named" Saksham (Women empowerment)" in conflict affected districts: Chitwan(Madi), Makwanpur, Sarlahi and Mahatori in CARE International in Nepal (2007-2009).
- Program Manager for a project named " Reproductive Rights of Adolescent" in conflict affected districts: Udaipur, Mahatori and Baglung in CEDPA Nepal (2005–2006).
- Human Resource Development Officer for a project named " Nepal Safer Motherhood project in Jumla" (2001–2004).
- Anesthetic Assistant Nurse at Bharatpur Hospital, Bharatpur (1994–1997).
- Founder- The Miteri Gangadevi Scholarship Fund 2009– Gauriganj Secondary School Gauriganj, Chitwan and The Miteri Ganga devi Peace Award 2014 (from the awarded money of Madan Purasakar)

== Education ==
- Primary education (Grade 1–7) -Gauriganj Lower Secondary School, Gaurigunj, Bharatpur, Chitwan.
- Secondary education(Grade 8–10) -Prembasti Secondary School, Prembasti, Bharatpur, Chitwan .
- Proficiency Certificate in General Nursing(Staff Nurse)-Pokhara Nursing Campus in Ramghat, Pokhara
- Bachelor's degree in Health Education-Saptagandaki Multiple Campus, Bharatpur, Chitwan.
- Master's degree in Health Education- Central Department of Education at Tribhuvan University, Kirtipur, Kathmandu
- Master of Arts in Sociology- Tri-Chandra Multiple Campus, Ghantaghar, Kathmandu
- Master in Development Management (MDM)-Asian Institute of Management, Makati City, Philippines
- Doctor of Philosophy (PhD)- Faculty of Education at Tribhuvan University, Kritipur, Kathmandu

== Publications ==
Paudel achieved widespread literary recognition with her debut book, Khalangama Hamala -an autobiographical war memoir- published by Nepalaya in 2013. The book chronicles her harrowing experiences and survival as a healthcare worker during a violent clash between the Maoist insurgents and government forces in the remote district headquarters of Jumla. The memoir was highly acclaimed for its raw depiction of the human cost of the Nepalese Civil War, earning Paudel the prestigious Madan Puraskar in 2014 (for the 2070 BS calendar year).

In addition to her war memoir, Paudel has authored several literary books: Apabitra Ragat ("Unholy Blood"), Roll No. 1, The Journey of Light of the Lamp from Lamjung to London, Surgical Menopause, Mariam Manchhe Bhai, Ustav, and Kattu. Likewise she also authored several books around Dignified Menstruation:Dignified Menstruation, A Practical Handbook; 2020, Dignified Menstruation, Is everyone's Business; 2019, Dignified Menstruation for Adolescent girls with Neurodevelopmental Disorders, Training Manual on Dignified Menstruation; 2023, Menstrual Stories from Global South, Menstrual Anthology; 2024.

She is also a contributing author(chapter) of Dignified Menstruation for various books published globally.

== Awards and recognition ==
- TripleA award(2020), Asian Institute of Management.
- N-Peace award(2012), UNDP Asia Regional Office, Bangkok
- Women Peace Maker (2012),University of San Diego, Institute of peace and justice, California,USA
- Madan Puraskar (2014) for the book Khalangama Hamala
- Youth Innovation award (2014),The Government of Nepal

== International engagement ==
She spoke for universities across globe: Austria (Afro Asiatisches Institut, Universität Salzburg, FH Salzburg, Vienna University), Germany (ASTA, Osnabruck, Bremen), Philippines (Asian Institute of Management), United Kingdom (London School of Public Health and Hygiene, Cambridge, Oxford, Essex University, Liverpool University, BCoT, Cranbourne), United States :Boston University, Harvard University, University of Arizona,University of San Diego, San Diego State University, Fullerton University, Florida University, Community Colleges, and Cigna University), Canada (British Columbia Vancouver) and spoke among more than three dozens of diaspora community in the US, UK, Norway, Germany, Austria, etc.

She is also associated with global networks and presented papers in various Global forums. She is involved in national and international research and policy discourses.
