= Madhab Basnet =

Nepalese journalist

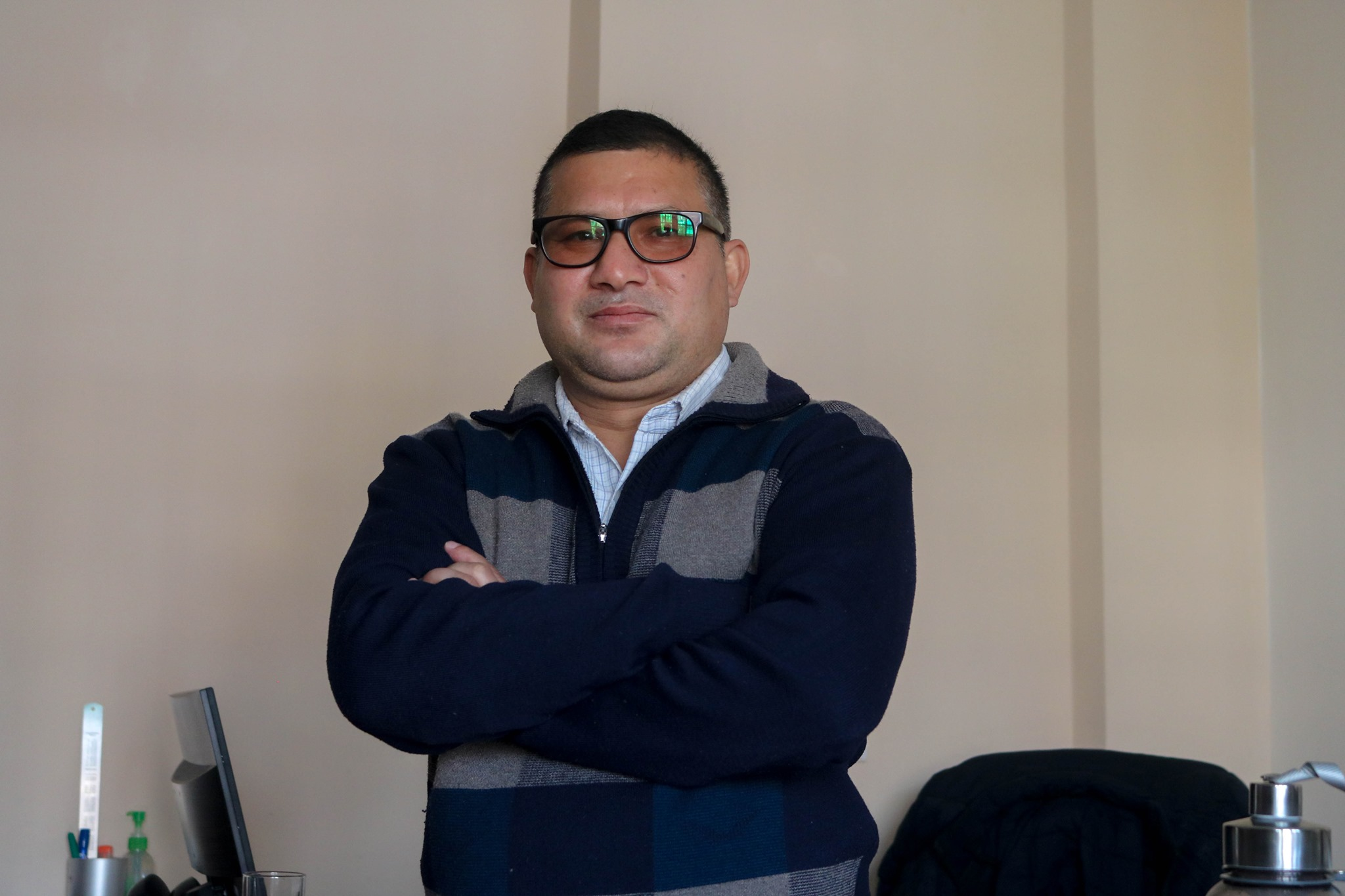
- Occupations: Journalist, author

Madhab Basnet (Nepali: माधव बस्नेत) is a senior correspondent and news editor at Nepal watch, a known online portal in Nepal. He previously worked at Nepal Magazine, known for his extensive coverage on Nepal's political transition surrounding Maoist movement, as well as at Ratopati.com, an online portal from Nepal. He is a co-editor of Nalekhiyeko Itihas (Unwritten History), the auto-graphical account of ex-minister and communist leader Radha Krishna Mainali.
