= Institute of Advanced Communication, Education and Research =

- IACER
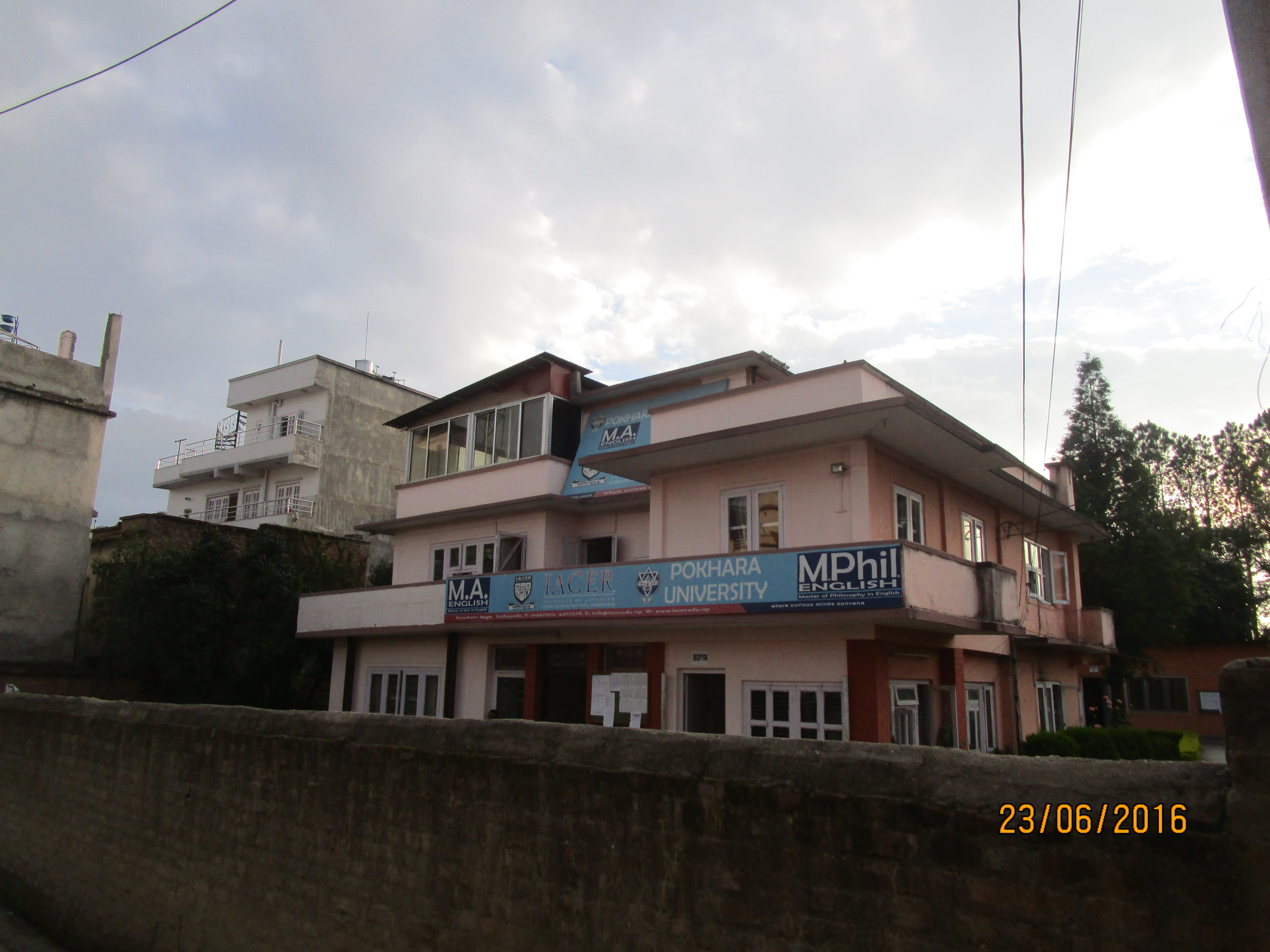
- Campus Building
- Type: College
- Established: 2001
- Affiliations: Pokhara University
- Principal: Krishna Niroula
- Academic staff: 31
- Students: 200+
- Location: Bhimsenagola Marga, Old Baneshwar, Kathmandu, Nepal
- Campus: Town
- Website: IACER.edu.np

IACER - Institute of Advanced Communication, Education and Research is a researched based college situated in Kathmandu, Nepal. It is established in 2001 and it is affiliated to Pokhara University. The aim of this institute is to provide advanced research degrees in the Humanities and Social Sciences, with English Studies at the heart of the academic experience.

== Courses offered ==
The college offers courses in

1. MA and
2. M. Phil
