= BroadTV =

Satellite TV service in Nepal

- Industry: Satellite television
- Founded: 2016
- Headquarters: Kathmandu
- Area served: Nepal
- Products: Direct broadcast satellite, Pay Television
- Owner: BroadLink
- Website: broadlink.com.np/pages/broadtv

BroadTV is a direct broadcast satellite television provider in Nepal.
