= Narayan Wagle =

Nepali Journalist and Writer

- नारायण वाग्ले
- Born: 19 September 1968 (age 56); Dharampani, Gandaki, Nepal
- Occupation(s): Journalist, writer
- Employer: Kantipur
- Notable work: Palpasa Cafe; Mayur Times
- Movement: Brihat Nagarik Andolan
- Relatives: Daman Nath Dhungana (father-in-law); Bhuwan Dhungana (mother-in-law)
- Awards: Madan Puraskar

Narayan Wagle is a Nepali journalist and writer. He served as the editor of Kantipur Daily, one of Nepal's largest circulating newspapers, until 2008, and was the editor of Nagarik News until 18 May 2012. Wagle won the Madan Puraskar for his novel Palpasa Cafe in 2005.

== Literary career ==
Palpasa Cafe was Wagle's first book, published in Nepali in 2005, and subsequently translated into English, Korean and French. It tells the story of an artist, Drishya, who goes trekking in the Nepali countryside in the midst of the Nepalese Civil War. It was a best seller and acclaimed for bringing the realities of the Nepalese Civil War to the public in a way journalism had failed to.

Mayur Times was Wagle's second book, published in Nepali in 2010. It also has themes dealing with the Nepali Civil War but is set after the war. It is a fictional narration of how journalists are caught in the crossfire, written from the perspective of a small-town newspaper in the Terai region of Nepal. Like its predecessor, Mayur Times sold moderately in Nepal but met with mixed reviews.

Koreana Coffee Guff, his third book, was published in 2019. It is a non-fiction book that recounts his traveling experiences in Korea. It received mixed reviews.

== See also ==
- Krishna Dharabasi
- Sudheer Sharma
