= Krishna Jwala Devkota =

Nepali journalist

- Occupations: Journalist, author
- Children: Siddhant Devkota, Rashmi Devkota

Krishna Jwala Devkota (Nepali: कृष्णज्वाला देवकोटा) is a Nepali journalist, currently editor-in-chief of the daily national newspaper Naya Patrika.
