= Gorkhapatra =

State-run daily newspaper of Nepal

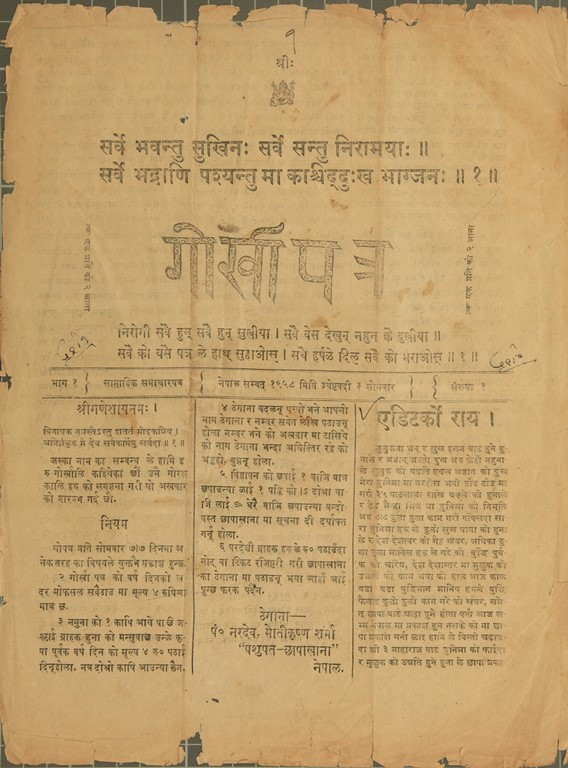
- First Issue of Gorkhapatra
- Type: Daily newspaper
- Format: Broadsheet
- Owner(s): Gorkhapatra Sansthan, Government of Nepal
- Founder: Dev Shumsher
- Publisher: Gorkhapatra Corporation
- Editor: Narad Gautam
- Founded: 6 May 1901 (125 years ago)
- Language: Nepali
- Headquarters: Dharma Path, Kathmandu
- Country: Nepal
- Sister newspapers: The Rising Nepal
- Website: Gorkhapatra Online

Gorkhapatra (Nepali: गोरखापत्र) is the oldest Nepali language state-owned national daily newspaper of Nepal. It was started as a weekly newspaper in May 1901 and became a daily newspaper in 1961. It is managed by the Gorkhapatra Sansthan. The Rising Nepal is an English-language sister newspaper of Gorkhapatra.

It is the sixth oldest newspaper in continuous publication in South Asia and the oldest in Nepal. Gorkha Bharat Jiban, edited by Motiram Bhatta was published in Varanasi in 1886, is considered the first Nepali language newsmagazine ever published. Gorkhapatra is the second Nepali-language newspaper to be published in Nepal, after Sudha Sagar.

== Name and etymology ==
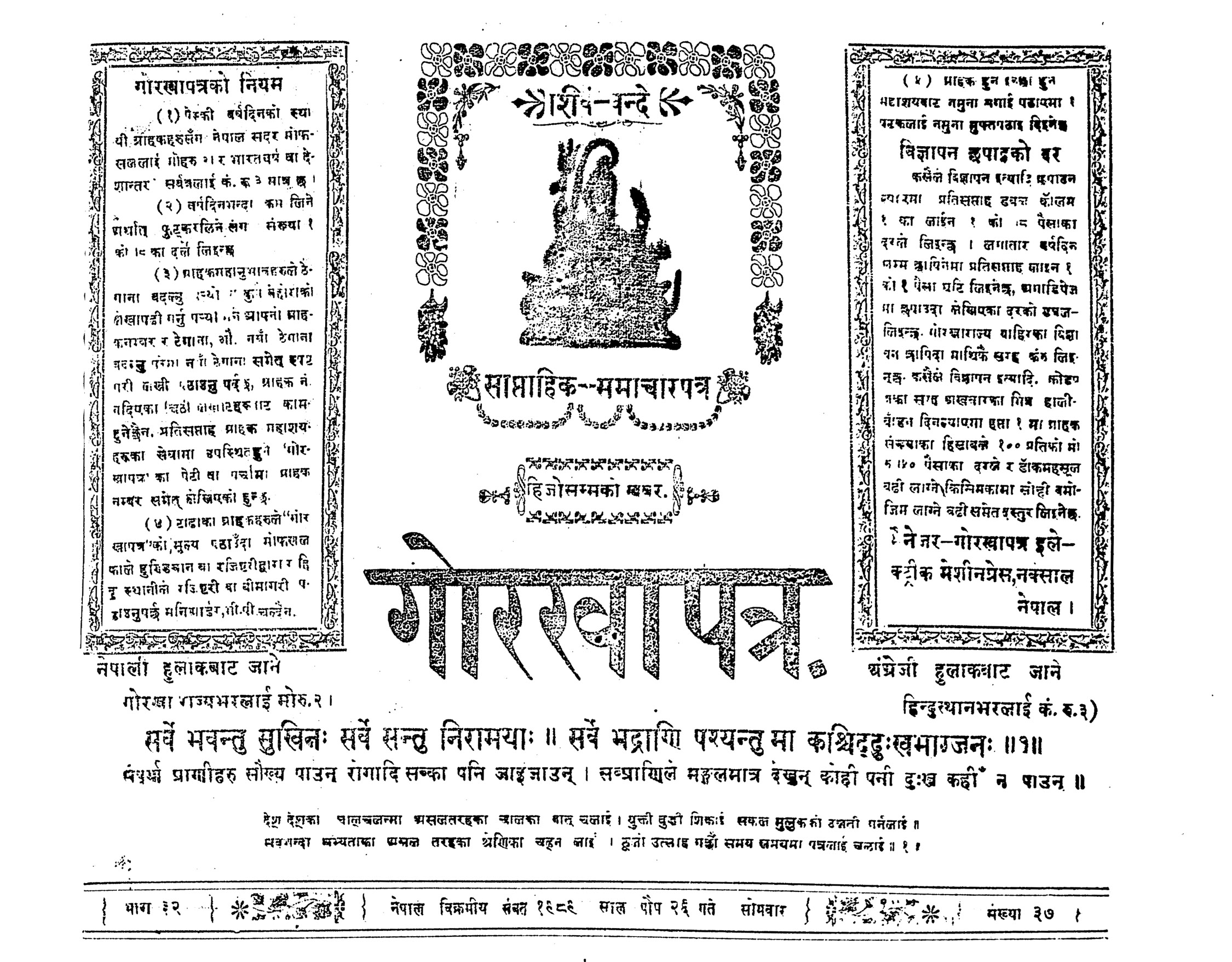
Gorkhapatra, dated January 9, 1933

The name of the newspaper is made of up two words— Gorkha and Patra. Gorkha was the erstwhile name of Nepal and was used interchangeably. The erstwhile Kingdom of Nepal was also known as Kingdom of Gorkha and Nepali language was known as Gorkhali language. Patra in Nepali translates to a mail or a document.

Initially, the name of the newspaper was written as गोर्खापत्र (with a Repha character), it was later changed to गोरखापत्र (with a Ra character) on 17 May 1926 (4 Jestha 1983 BS). During the reign of the King Gyanendra, the name was reverted to initial form but was again changed to its second form (गोरखापत्र) on 1 May 2006 (18 Baisakh 2063 BS), after the end of Gyanendra's rule.

== History ==
It was founded by Dev Shumsher Jung Bahadur Rana on 6 May 1901 (24 Baisakh 1958 BS). Dev Shumsher was considered to be one of the more liberal Rana Prime minister. It was initially managed by Pandit Nara Dev Pandey and was published weekly under the supervision of Lt. Col. Dilli Shumsher Thapa. During the early days, the title of editor was not prevalent. Pt. Nara Dev Pandey was referred as Talukdar (manager). Pandey was given a 14–point list of do's and don'ts regarding the matters to be published.

Dev Shumsher was replaced by Chandra Shumsher, as the prime minister of Nepal, just after two months of the establishment of Gorkhpatra. Chandra Shumsher exiled Dev Shumsher to Palpa. Pt. Nara Dev Pandey served as Talukdar for 2 years till September 1903 (Bhadra 1960 BS).

Chandra Shumsher then appointed his son-in-law, Jaya Prithvi Bahadur Singh as the new Talukdar on 7 September 1903 (22 Bhadra 1960 BS). Singh was also provided with all the income earned by the paper from 23 August 1905 (8 Bhadra 1962 BS) to 14 December 1908 (30 Mangsir 1965 BS).

There is a dispute over who the first editor of the newspaper is. Prem Raj became the first person to be referred as an editor of the newspaper. He was appointed as editor on 18 May 1934 (5 Jestha 1991 BS). Bal Krishna Sama was appointed the first Editor-in-Chief of the newspaper on 28 August 1955 (12 Bhadra 2012 BS). He work as the Editor-in-Chief till 9 October 1957 (23 Ashoj 2014 BS).

The official registration of the Nepalese newspapers begun in 1994 BS (1937–1938). Sharada, a monthly literary magazine became the first one to register and Gorkhapatra was registered with registration number two on 14 April 1938 (2 Baisakh 1995 BS).

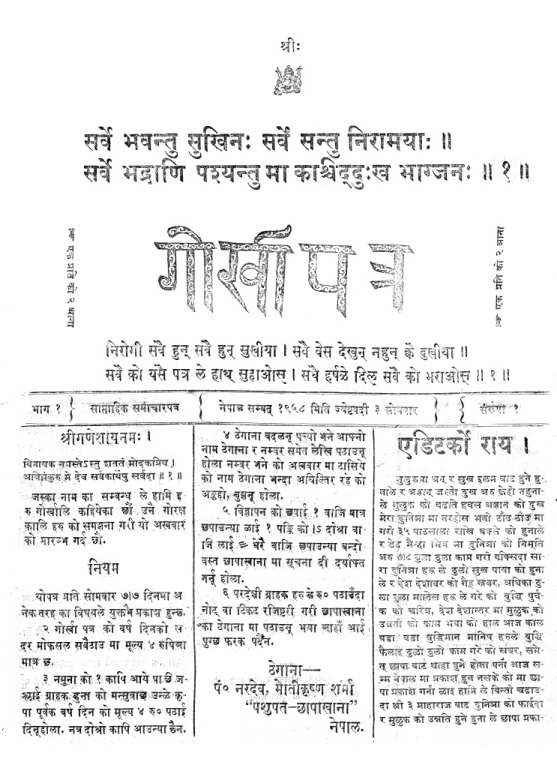
First issue of Gorkhapatra

The newspaper was initially printed by Pashupat Press. The address of the newspaper was printed as Pt. Nara Dev, Motikrishna Sharma, Pashupat Press, Nepal. Pt. Nara Dev was the manager of the Gorkhapatra whereas Motikrishna Sharma was the combined name of Motiram Bhatta and Krishna Dev Pandey. The press was initially started as a bookshop by Bhatta and his maternal uncle Krishna Dev Pandey as Motikrishna Dhirendra Company in 1945 BS (1888–1889). In 1950 BS (1893–1894), Pashupat Press was established alongside the company. The press was located in Thahiti, Kathmandu.

The printing was shifted to a web offset machine in 2038 BS (1981–1982) and to a colour press on 24 June 2002 (10 Ashar 2059 BS). The publication of the news in other Nepalese languages was started on 18 September 2007, under the title Naya Nepal and at present news materials are being published in 38 languages.

Gorkhapatra Corporation was formed on 9 July 1963 (25 Ashar 2020 BS) under the Gorkhapatra Corporation Act 2019. Narayan Prasad Baskota served as the founding director of the corporation.

=== Timeline ===
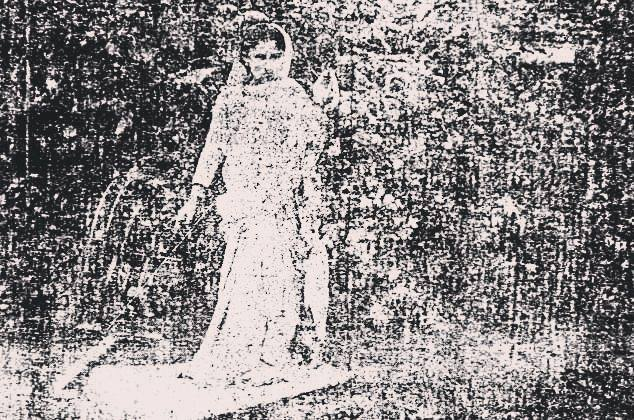
The first-ever photo in a Nepalese newspaper was published in Gorkhapatra on 26 April 1927. National Photojournalism Day is celebrated every year on 26th of April in Nepal.

Important events in the history of the newspaper (Nepali Bikram Sambat dates in brackets alongside description):

6 May 1901
Start of weekly publication on Mondays (24 Baisakh 1958 BS)
26 April 1927
The first photo was printed on the newspaper. The photograph was of Suryamati Shrestha, a 12 year old girl from Birgunj who was weaving thread from a Chandra Kamdhenu spinning wheel. (13 Baisakh 1984 BS)
21 April 1934
The day of publication was shifted to Fridays. (9 Baisakh 1991 BS)
1 September 1941
The first special edition, Udayangka was published. (17 Bhadra 1998 BS)
15 October 1943
Beginning of bi-weekly publication; distributed on Tuesdays and Fridays. (29 Ashoj 2000 BS)
23 December 1946
Beginning of tri-weekly publication. (8 Poush 2003 BS)
18 February 1961
Beginning of daily publication. (7 Falgun 2017 BS)
23 June 1962
Beginning of the Saturday appendix (9 Ashar 2019 BS)
18 October 1962
Beginning of the Publication twice in the morning and evening. (2 Kartik 2019)
8 October 1965
End of the Publication twice in the morning and evening. The distribution of the newspaper became daily again. (22 Ashoj 2022 BS)
17 August 1988
Beginning of the print of the additional 4 paged Special Friday appendix (Ramailo Sukrabar) (Bhadra 2045 BS)
6 May 2000
Hundred anniversary of the first publication of Gorkhapatra. (24 Baisakh 2057 BS)

== Present day ==
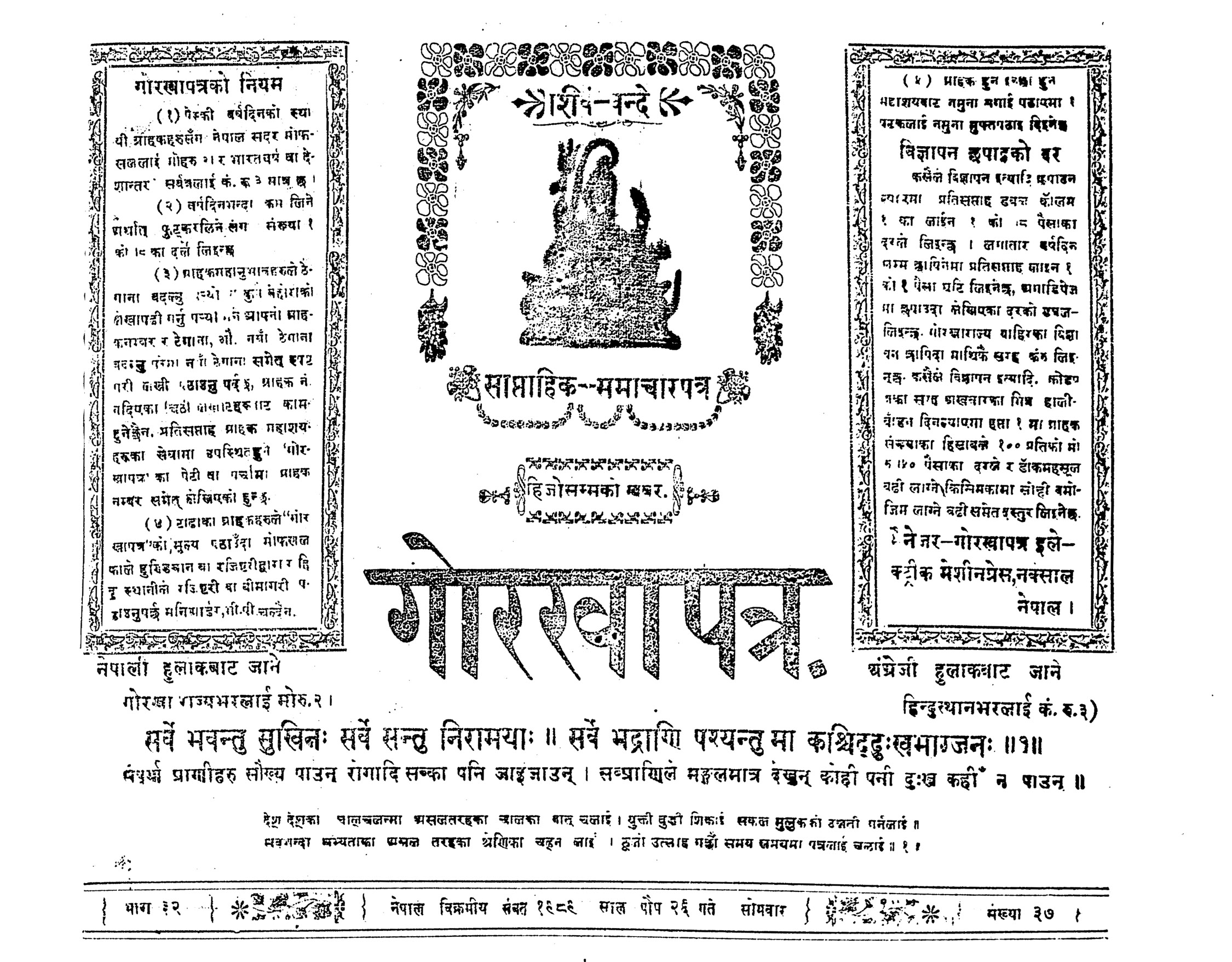
Homepage of Gorkhapatra news-site (6 April 2022)

Presently, Gorkhapatra is also printed in Kohalpur for western region of Nepal and Biratnagar for eastern region of Nepal, alongside Kathmandu. As of 2021, it had a total circulation of more than 50,000. Gorkhapatra is also accessible through its website.

== Sister publications ==
- GorkhapatraOnline National Daily Newspaper
- The Rising Nepal, English-language national daily
- Madhuparka, a literary monthly magazine
- Muna, a children's monthly magazine
- Yuba Manch, a youth monthly magazine

== Criticisms ==
The paper have been criticised for being government's proponent throughout history. During Rana rule, the newspaper was heavily censored. The newspaper did not publis the news of the execution of the four martyrs by the Rana government in 1941. The newspaper also portrayed Chiranjibi Wagle, a person who had held important portfolios as the Minister for Physical Planning and Works and Minister for Information and Communications and Home Minister, as innocent in a corruption case. Wagle was later acquitted for corruption and jailed in 2011.

The online version of the newspaper deleted an article published on 7 December 2021 containing criticism of the Nepali Congress government. The article was retracted due to political pressure from the Prime Minister's Office.

== See also ==
- Kantipur
- List of newspapers in Nepal
- Nagarik
