= Radio Lumbini =

Community based FM radio in Nepal

Radio Lumbini (Nepali:रेडियो लुम्बिनी) is a Nepalese radio station. It started broadcasting on 10 February 2000 and is locally financed. It is known for being the first co-operative radio in South Asia and the first rural radio station in Nepal. It transmits on FM 96.8 MHz. Radio Lumbini transmits for eighteen hours a day, and produces programmes related to social, cultural and environmental awareness. The base station is located near Manigram town in Lumbini Province.

== See also ==
- List of FM radio stations in Nepal
