= Nagarik (daily) =

Nepali-language daily newspaper

Nagarik News
- Front page of Nagarik on 02 February 2017
- Type: Daily newspaper
- Format: Broadsheet
- Owner: Nepal Republic Media Pvt. Ltd.
- Founder: Shova Gyawali
- Publisher: Binod Raj Gyawali
- Editor: Gunaraj Luitel
- Photo editor: Bijaya Mani Hartamchhali Rai
- Founded: April 23, 2008; 18 years ago
- Language: Nepali
- Headquarters: JDA complex, Bagdarwar, Kathmandu
- Country: Nepal
- Circulation: 375000
- Sister newspapers: Shukrabar
- Website: nagariknews.com

Nagarik is a Nepali-language daily newspaper means Nagarikapatrika , published from Kathmandu, Biratnagar, and Nepalgunj of Nepal simultaneously. It is owned by Nepal Republic Media Pvt.Ltd founded by Shova Gyawali

== See also ==
- Kantipur
- Gorkhapatra
