= Nepali Times =

Nepali English newspaper

- Front page of January 11, 2013 issue
- Publisher and Editor: Kunda Dixit
- Associate Editor: Om Astha Rai
- Categories: News magazine
- Frequency: Weekly
- Circulation: 50000/week
- Publisher: Kunda Dixit
- First issue: June 28, 2000; 25 years ago
- Company: Himalmedia (pl)
- Country: Nepal
- Based in: Patan Dhoka Lalitpur Nepal Lalitpur
- Language: English
- Website: nepalitimes.com
- ISSN: 1814-2613
- OCLC: 244793967

Nepali Times is an English weekly newspaper that provides reporting and commentary on Nepali politics, business, culture, travel and society in 16 pages. The weekly is aimed at the expatriate, diplomatic and business communities in Kathmandu, and through the internet for the Nepali diaspora. It is published by Himalmedia (pl), which also publishes Himal Khabarpatrika. Nepali Times appears every Friday morning in hardcopy with augmented multimedia content on its website.

Since its founding in 2000, the weekly has been edited and published by Kunda Dixit, who also wrote the long-running and popular Under My Hat satirical columns from 2000-2006.

== See also ==
- Himal Khabarpatrika
