= Saptahik =

Nepalese tabloid

- Type: Weekly newspaper
- Format: Print, online
- Owner: Kantipur Publications
- Founded: 2000
- Language: Nepali
- Website: http://saptahik.com.np/

Saptahik was a weekly tabloid published by Kantipur Publications in Nepal. It was one of the popular newspapers among youth in Nepal. It stopped publishing after the COVID-19 pandemic.

== Editors ==
Rajaram Gautam was editor in chief of Saptahik.
