= Radio Sagarmatha =

Community radio station in Kathmandu, Nepal

- Bhanimandal, Ringroad, Lalitpur; Nepal
- Broadcast area: Kathmandu Valley

Programming
- Language: Nepali

Ownership
- Owner: Nepal Forum of Environmental Journalists (Nefej)

History
- Call sign meaning: Radio Sagarmatha

Technical information
- Class: Community
- ERP: 100 watt

Links
- Website: www.radiosagarmatha.org.np

Radio Sagarmatha is an FM radio station in Kathmandu Valley of Nepal. Established in May 1997, Radio Sagarmatha is the first independent community radio broadcasting station in South Asia. The meaning of Sagarmatha is Mount Everest. It airs its programs in FM 102.4 MHz.

== History ==
Radio Sagarmatha was founded by the Nepal Forum of Environmental Journalists (NEFEJ) with the cooperation of the Nepal Press Institute, Himal Association, and World View Nepal.

== Programming ==
Radio Sagarmatha broadcasts its programs in the Nepali language as well as in many ethnic languages of Nepal including Newar (also known as Nepal Bhasa), Maithali and Tamang. It has nine news bulletins (Halchal/हलचल ) daily, broadcasting 18 hours a day. It has popular daily discussion programmes Aajaka Kura/आजका कुरा (Talk of Today), Dabali /डबली (Forum), and more than 90 programmes a week. Among them are many on different social issues like public health, rule of law, education for all, environment, sustainable development, gender equality, women's empowerment, good governance, human rights, culture and tourism, literature, voices of minorities, youth, workers, folk music and others. It has the strength to raise public issues and make impact at the policy level. The main aim of Radio Sagarmatha is to change society in a positive manner and be the voice of the voiceless poor. Radio Sagarmatha has been broadcasting a popular programme to preserve the social, economic and cultural history of Nepali society, named Uhile Bajeka Palama (in the time of forefathers). The 81-year-old senior journalist Bhairab Risal talks to his senior guests about the social, cultural and economic situation of their time in his stylish way of testimony.

== Administration ==
The Nepal Forum of Environmental Journalists has formed a board to run Radio Sagarmatha. The station manager is the executive chief of the station. Radio Sagarmatha has always been in front line of the struggle for the press freedom in Nepal. It has played a vital role in conducting the Save Independent Radio Movement in cooperation with other likeminded institutions, while the government put a ban on current affairs during the direct rule of King Gyanendra after February 1, 2005. Five radio journalists were arrested and the station was shut down for 43 hours and 47 minutes by the Royal government in 2006 accusing of broadcasting the interview of Prachanda, the Maoist Chair Person, one of the top underground leader of rebellion. Radio Sagarmatha resumed its on air immediately after getting verdict by the Supreme Court in favor of it.

When it began, Radio Sagarmatha was broadcast by a 100 watt capacity transmitter. But these days, the broadcasting capacity of Radio Sagarmatha is 1 kilowatt. It has claimed that around 2.5 million people listen to it regularly. More than 70 journalists are working at Radio Sagarmatha, among them half volunteers. An Ex-Supreme Court Judge and Ex-Chief Election Commissioner have been volunteer producers of Radio Sagarmatha. Bharat Dutta Koirala, prominent media person and the winner of the 2002 Ramon Magsaysay Award in Journalism, Literature and Creative Communication Arts, is one of the founders of Radio Sagarmatha.

== See also ==
- List of FM radio stations in Nepal
