= Mountain Television =

Nepali television news channel

- Mountain Television logo
- Broadcast area: Nepal
- Headquarters: Kathmandu, Nepal

Ownership
- Owner: Padma Group
- Sister channels: Bhaktidarshan International TV; Business Plus TV

History
- Launched: 2009

Links
- Website: www.emountaintv.com

Availability

Streaming media
- YouTube: Available on YouTube

Mountain Television is a news channel of Nepal which was launched in 2009. Its headquarters is situated in Kathmandu, Nepal. Mountain Television is the nation's first popular and leading analytical news channel, with bureaus inside and outside Nepal.

Mountain TV is owned & operated by Padma Group, – one of Nepal's leading media corporations with a portfolio of three satellite televisions including Bhaktidarshan International TV broadcasting spiritual, religious content & Business Plus TV broadcasting economic & business related issues. Kedarnath Koirala is the news chief of Mountain Television since 2024 December and Mohan Prasad Mainali the editor since June 15, 2025. Mountain Television has online news portal also. www.emountaintv.com and Mohan Mainali is editor.

== Programs ==
- Mission News
- Mountain Focus
- Mountain Sambad
- Urja Bahas
- Biz Talk
- Shikshya Sarokar
- Mountain Health Desk
