= Mijuredanda =

Coordinates: 28.27°N 84.18°E

- Village Development Committee
- Location in Nepal Mijuredanda (Nepal)
- Country: Nepal
- Province: Gandaki Province
- District: Kaski District

Population (1991)
  - Total: 4,394
- Time zone: UTC+5:45 (Nepal Time)

Mijuredanda is a town and Village Development Committee in Kaski District in Gandaki Province of northern-central Nepal. At the time of the 1991 Nepal census it had a population of 4,394 persons living in 907 individual households.
