= Sagarmatha Television =

Nepali television broadcast in the United States

- Country: Nepal
- Broadcast area: United States
- Network: MHZ
- Headquarters: Washington DC

History
- Launched: 1997

Links
- Website: www.sagarmathatv.us

Sagarmatha Television, is a Nepali television program broadcast from Washington DC, US. It is the first Nepali television broadcast from the United States. It was established in 1996. In United States, Sagarmatha Television is broadcast every Sunday at 12:30 PM on MHZ Networks, followed by Nepal Darshan at 1:00 PM. This program intends to keep people informed of things happening in Nepal and also to display its culture to the multinational communities in America and around the world.
