= Dil Bhusan Pathak =

Nepali journalist

- दिलभूषण पाठक
- Born: Jhapa, Nepal
- Citizenship: Nepali
- Occupation: Journalism
- Television: Kantipur Television

Dil Bhusan Pathak (Nepali: दिलभूषण पाठक) is a journalist and had worked in Kantipur Television Network Pvt. Ltd.

== Life and career ==
Besides journalism, he has also worked as a film director. In 2021 Pathak received Prabal Jana Sewa Shree Padak (प्रबल जनसेवाश्री पदक) by the Nepal Government .
