= Naya Patrika =

Nepali-language daily broadsheet

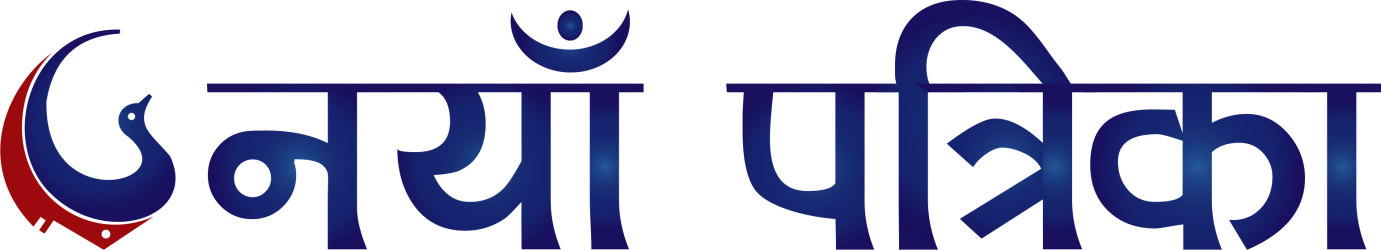
- Type: Daily newspaper
- Format: Broadsheet
- Owner: Naya Prakashan Pvt. Ltd.
- Publisher: Krishna Jwala Devkota
- President: Krishna Jwala Devkota
- Editor-in-chief: Krishna Jwala Devkota
- Founded: 2007; 18 years ago
- Language: Nepali
- Headquarters: Putalisadak, Kathmandu, Nepal
- Country: Nepal
- Circulation: 275,000
- Website: nayapatrikadaily.com

Naya Patrika National Daily (Nepali: नयाँ पत्रिका) is a daily newspaper published in Nepal, founded in 2007. It is Nepali language broadsheet newspaper with a daily print run of 270,000 copies. It is the first daily Nepalese print media to publish 7 different province-wise editions. The newspapers are printed and distributed from Kohalpur, Butwal, Kathmandu and Biratnagar.
