= The Rising Nepal =

English language newspaper in Nepal

- The First & Foremost National Daily
- Type: Daily newspaper
- Format: Broadsheet
- Owner(s): Gorkhapatra Sansthan, Government of Nepal
- Editor-in-chief: Bhimsen Thapaliya
- Founded: 16 December 1965; 60 years ago
- Language: English
- Country: Nepal
- Sister newspapers: Gorkhapatra
- Website: risingnepaldaily.com

The Rising Nepal is a Nepalese government-owned daily newspaper published by the Gorkhapatra Sansthan. It is a major English-language daily in Nepal. It is a sister publication of the Nepali-language Gorkhapatra, the oldest national daily newspaper of Nepal.

Bhimsen Thapaliya is the current Editor-in-Chief of the national daily.

== History ==
The Rising Nepal was established on 16 December 1965 (1 Poush 2022 BS) by the then Panchayat Government. Barun Shumsher Rana served as the founding chief editor. The newspaper was priced at 15 paisa.

The launching copy of the newspaper was discovered in 2021 in the archives of Krishna Bhakta Shrestha, one of the founding reporters. It was handed over to Madan Puraskar Pustakalaya for archiving. The historical first copy also contains a signature of the then Crown Prince of Nepal Birendra Shah.

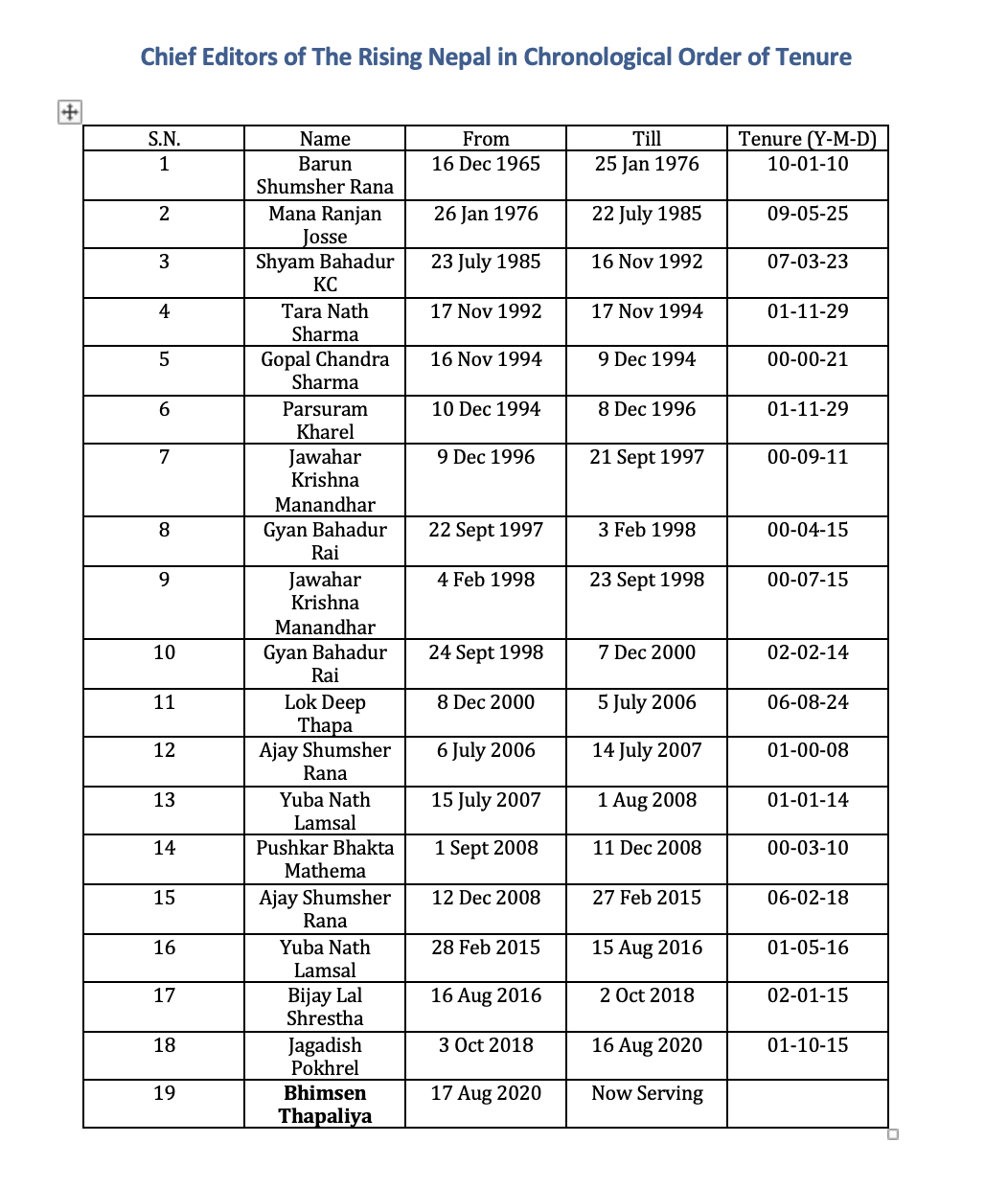
Chief Editors of The Rising Nepal - Chronological Order - Jan 2025.docx
