= My Republica =

Nepalese daily newspaper

República
- Type: National daily newspaper
- Format: Broadsheet
- Owner: Nepal Republic Media Ltd.
- Editor: Kosh Raj Koirala
- Founded: 2009
- Language: English
- Headquarters: Kathmandu, Nepal
- Country: Nepal
- Circulation: 12000
- Website: myrepublica.nagariknetwork.com

Republica (stylised as República) is an English-language national daily newspaper published by Nepal Republic Media in Kathmandu, Nepal.

Founded by in 2009 by Ameet Dhakal, República is the sister publication of Nagarik, the vernacular Nepali-language daily published by the same company.

== Overview ==
Ameet Dhakal was the founding editor in chief of the newspaper but resigned in April 2012, whereupon Kosmos Biswakarma took over the editorship. In November 2014, Subhash Ghimire was then named editor-in-chief of the newspaper. Kosh Raj Koirala succeeded him as editor-in-chief after Ghimire resigned from his post in September 2021.

Nepal Republic Media is owned by the Gyawali family, who co-founded Nepal's Kantipur Publications. The Gyawalis split with their partners, the Sirohiyas, in 2008 and went on to establish Nepal Republic Media.

Since 2014, Republica has ceased printing a standalone edition and has partnered with The New York Times International Edition to deliver a joint print edition containing the two publications in separate sections. As of 2026, digital subscriptions to Republica also include digital access to The New York Times.

== Controversy ==
Ever since Ghimire took over as editor-in-chief, the newspaper has courted controversy for its ultra-nationalist stances and for failing to adhere to the basics of journalism, including corroboration and right of reply. For instance, in June 2019, Republica published a report alleging that Dambar Chemjong, a lecturer at Tribhuvan University, had been appointed to the university despite being ineligible. Chemjong contested the report and provided documents disputing the newspaper's report. Republica took down the article, apologized to Chemjong and issued a clarification, stating that "the story was incomplete and did not represent the full circumstances surrounding his [Chemjong's] appointment at TU.

Days later, Republica once again alleged that professor Neelam Kumar Sharma, former head of research at Tribhuvan University, had plagiarized an article from the International Journal of Interdisciplinary Studies. Republica had apparently used "plagiarism software" but was once again forced to issue a retraction after Sharma contested the allegations. Republica took down the article and apologized to Sharma, saying that "the software used in scanning Sharma's article was not up to the standard" and that they would "further strengthen our fact-checking system".
