= The Kathmandu Post =

English-language newspaper in Nepal

- Without Fear or Favour
- Front page of The Kathmandu Post on 2 February 2017
- Type: Daily newspaper
- Format: Broadsheet
- Publisher: Kantipur Publications
- Editor-in-chief: Biswas Baral
- Founded: February 1993; 33 years ago
- Language: English
- Headquarters: Kathmandu
- Country: Nepal
- Circulation: 95,000
- Website: kathmandupost.com

The Kathmandu Post is a major daily newspaper published in Nepal. Founded in February 1993 by Shyam Goenka, it is one of the largest English-language newspapers in the country. The newspaper is published by Kantipur Publications, the publishers of Nepal's largest selling newspaper, the Nepali-language Kantipur. Post is a member of the Asia News Network, an alliance of nineteen Asian newspapers. The Kathmandu Post is Nepal's first privately owned English broadsheet daily, and is Nepal's largest selling English language newspaper, with a daily circulation of 95,000 copies.

The Post's first five pages are primarily dedicated to national news. Each day, the last page offers a variety of features, including explainers, interviews, auto reviews, and restaurant reviews and destinations. During the weekdays, the newspaper also features culture & arts pages, which cover national and international news on society, life and style, fashion and technology. On the weekends, the Post focuses on long-form journalism, satire and creative non-fiction articles.

Since 2018, under the editorship of Anup Kaphle, the Post focused on longer investigative pieces, analyses and explainers, making those the core of its daily reporting. Kaphle resigned in February 2020 and was replaced as editor by Sanjeev Satgainya. Biswas Baral, former editor of The Annapurna Express, was appointed editor in September 2022 after Satgainya resigned. Satgainya and Baral reversed many of the changes that Kaphle had made, turning the paper back to its previous focus on op-ed and political reporting.

== Controversy ==
In October 2007, the offices of The Kathmandu Post were attacked by the All Nepal Printing and Publication Workers' Union, a group connected to the former Maoist rebels of the Unified Communist Party of Nepal (Maoist). The printing press was vandalized, stopping the paper from being published. Two hundred journalists and legal professionals marched in Kathmandu in protest at the attacks.

=== Chinese Embassy controversy ===
On 18 February 2020, The Kathmandu Post republished an article by Ivo Daalder, a former US ambassador to NATO, which was originally published in The Korea Herald, a member of the Asia News Network, with an accompanying stock illustration from Shutterstock that showed Mao Zedong wearing a mask. The Chinese Embassy in Nepal took serious exception to the article and the illustration, issuing a press statement that said the article had been published with "malicious intention" and had "deliberately smeared the efforts of the Chinese government and people fighting against the new coronavirus pneumonia and even viciously attacked the political system of China". The press statement was widely condemned by journalists and diplomats for breaching "diplomatic decorum" and was seen as an attempt by the Chinese government to stifle press freedom in a neighboring country.

=== The Kathmandu Post offline ===
On 9 September 2025, The Kathmandu Post went offline after a fire broke out at the Kantipur Media Group (KMG) headquarters in Thapathali, Kathmandu, during the Gen Z protests.

The blaze damaged servers hosting the newspaper’s website, along with other KMG digital platforms. Kantipur TV and Radio Kantipur also faced technical disruptions.
