= Online Khabar =

Nepali online news portal

- Type: Online News Portal
- Founder: Dharma Raj Bhusal
- President: Dharma Raj Bhusal
- Editor-in-chief: Basanta Basnet
- Associate editor: Sudarshan Khatiwada
- Founded: 2006
- Language: Nepali & English
- Headquarters: Kathmandu, Nepal
- Website: Online Khabar (in Nepali); Online Khabar (in English)

Online Khabar is a private online news portal of Nepal established in 2006, providing news in Nepali and English languages. There is no print available from this media house. In 2014, it was one of the top 10 web news portal in Nepal. By 2020, it became the most viewed news portal from Nepal. The rise in online viewing of online newspapers including Online Khabar has been partially attributed to the Gorkha earthquake of 2015 during which the print media had stopped.

The news agency actively advocates free journalism by taking part against media censorship by the state.

Online Khabar bought Himalaya TV to provided converged content to Nepali audiences.

In 2020, the COVID-19 pandemic reporting was done by the news portal without any official confirmation.
