= Kantipur (daily) =

Nepali newspaper

Kantipur कान्तिपुर

- Front page of Kantipur on 02 February 2017
- Type: Daily newspaper
- Format: Broadsheet
- Owner(s): Kantipur Media Group
- Founder(s): Shyam Goenka
- Publisher: Kailash Sirohiya
- Editor-in-chief: Umesh Chauhan
- Founded: February 20, 1993; 32 years ago
- Language: Nepali
- Headquarters: Central Business Park, Thapathali, Kathmandu
- Country: Nepal
- Circulation: 453,000
- Sister newspapers: Nari Magazine, Nepal Magazine, and Saptahik
- Website: ekantipur.com

Kantipur (Nepali: कान्तिपुर) is a Nepali language daily newspaper, published from Kathmandu, Biratnagar, Nepalgunj, and Bharatpur of Nepal simultaneously. It was founded by Shyam Goenka. Kantipur's publishers report that the circulation of this newspaper is just above 453,000 copies per day. It is regarded as the most widely read newspaper in Nepal; according to an audience survey in 2016, over half of those who read newspapers in Nepal were readers of Kantipur, considerably more than any other newspapers. Kantipur is considered the paper of record in Nepal.

Sudheer Sharma was the editor-in-chief of the newspaper from August 6, 2019 to May 21, 2023. He was replaced by Umesh Chauhan as editor-in-chief. The other sister publications of Kantipur Daily are Nari Magazine (Monthly Magazine), Nepal Magazine (Weekly Magazine), and Saptahik (Weekly Magazine).

== History ==
Kantipur, first published on 7th Falgun 2049 BS (18 February 1993) along with its sister publication The Kathmandu Post, is often credited for taking the lead in institutionalizing free press and professional journalism in the country. Kantipur has not only been praised for its stance towards multi-party democracy and press freedom in Nepal but also has faced government scrutiny and repression.

== Controversies ==
After publishing the rebel leader Baburam Bhattarai's article on the Royal Massacre in 2001, the government arrested Kantipur's editor Yuvraj Ghimire along with other members in the management team. In June 2010, Kantipur accused the Indian Embassy of interfering with its coverage by punitively withdrawing advertisements from the company and delaying shipments of newsprint from India.

In March 2018, the Kantipur daily was subpoenaed by the Chief Justice of Nepal Gopal Prasad Parajuli. The Kantipur's Editor-in-chief, Chairman, a Company Director and a reporter appeared before the Supreme Court of Nepal, as the Kantipur daily was accused of contempt of court for a series of articles indicating that the Chief Justice of Nepal Gopal Prasad Parajuli had given different dates of birth on several official documents.

== Supplements ==
Kantipur used to publish three supplements, on Fridays, Saturdays and Sundays called Shukrabar, Kosheli and Kopila. Shukrabar was targeted mainly towards youth with articles on gadgets, fashion, and trends. Kosheli was a variety, while Kopila was targeted towards kids with puzzles, arts, and stories. These supplements have now been discontinued.

== See also ==
- Nagarik
- Gorkhapatra
- Kathmandu Post
- Annapurna Post

== Social media ==
- Kantipur Daily Instagram
- Kantipur Daily Twitter
- Kantipur Daily Facebook
- Kantipur Daily Tiktok
