= Himal Khabarpatrika =

Nepali monthly news magazine

- Front page of Himal Khabarpatrika on 29 January 2017
- Editor: Santa Gaha Magar
- Categories: News magazine
- Frequency: Monthly
- Publisher: Kanak Mani Dixit
- Founded: 1988
- Company: Himalmedia (pl)
- Country: Nepal
- Based in: Patandhoka, Lalitpur
- Language: Nepali
- Website: www.himalkhabar.com
- ISSN: 1606-8041

Himalkhabar.com (Nepali: हिमाल खबरपत्रिका) is a Nepali language monthly news magazine published by Himalmedia Private Limited. It has developed a choice following of both the rural and urban intelligentsia, maintaining credibility and an inclusive editorial voice. While its readership spans the country, Nepalis worldwide also read it, including the opinion-forming and decision-making classes and the vernacular-elite. Khabarpatrika’s share is a sizeable chunk of the vernacular reading population of Nepal, and the quality of that readership means that the messages get maximum dissemination.

== Staff ==
- Publisher: Kanak Mani Dixit
- Editor: Santa Gaha Magar
