= The Himalayan Times =

English-language broadsheet newspaper published in Nepal

- Front page on 2 February 2017
- Type: Daily newspaper
- Format: Broadsheet
- Publisher: International Media Network Nepal Pvt Ltd.
- Editor: Rajan Pokhrel
- Founded: 23 November 2001; 24 years ago
- Language: English
- Headquarters: Maharajgunj, Kathmandu
- Country: Nepal
- Website: thehimalayantimes.com

The Himalayan Times is an English-language broadsheet newspaper published and distributed daily in Nepal. Rajan Pokhrel is the acting editor. The newspaper has previously received recognition from Press Council Nepal, including the Press Council Code of Conduct Journalism Award in 2021. However, the newspaper has also faced complaints and action from the Press Council over journalistic conduct. In 2025, Press Council Nepal reportedly blacklisted The Himalayan Times following a complaint concerning its reporting, although the newspaper disputed the decision. The newspaper has also appeared in Press Council records concerning complaints about published content.

The newspaper was founded on 23 November 2001. It is based in Maharajgunj, Kathmandu. It is owned by International Media Network Nepal (Pvt) Ltd which in turn is owned by Nepali investors. The paper's competitors tried to organise and lobby against the entry of foreign-owned newspaper in the country, but were not successful.

At the time of its founding, it published in 12 pages, six of them coloured, and was priced as Rs 2. Within a year, it had become one of the premier English language dailies in Nepal, and claimed to be number one in terms of English news paper readership.
