= List of Nepali television stations =

This article covers the television stations established in Nepal and Nepali-language television stations worldwide.

Television in Nepal was first introduced in 1983 (Bikram Samwat 2042) as the state-owned Nepal Television, commonly abbreviated as NTV.

== List of television stations inside Nepal ==
=== A. Main Stream/ Television Stations ===
Name	Quality	Est Date	Owner	Broadcast From	Region	Slogan
Nepal Television	Full HD	1985	Nepal Government	Singha Durbar, Kathmandu	Nationwide	Communication for Development
Kantipur Television	Full HD	2003	Kantipur Television Network Ltd	Subidhanagar, Kathmandu, Nepal	Worldwide	
NTV Plus HD	Full HD	2003	Nepal Government	Kathmandu	Nationwide	
Image Channel	Full HD	2003	Image Channel Pvt. Ltd	Kathmandu	Worldwide	
Avenues TV	Full HD	2007	Bhaskar Raj Rajkaranikar	Kathmandu	Nationwide	(राष्ट्रको सर्वश्रेष्ठ खबर टेलिभिजन)
Sagarmatha TV	HD	2007	Sagarmatha Television Pvt. Ltd	Kathmandu	Nationwide	तपाईंको तेश्रो आँखा
Bageshwori Tv	Full HD	2024	Jaya Bageshwori Media Network Pvt. Ltd.	Nepalgunj	Nationwide	फरक शैली सत्या बोली
ABC TV	HD	2008	A.B.C. Television Pvt. Ltd.	Kathmandu	Nationwide	गणतन्त्र नेपालको वास्तविक समाचार
NICE TV	HD	2017	NICE GROUP	Down Town, Kathmandu	Nationwide & Worldwide	Nepal's Second Satellite HD Television
Buddha TV	HD	2009	Community	Butwal, Nepal		शान्तिका लागि संचार
Dharma Television	HD	2009	Private	Swyambhu, Kathmandu	Worldwide	
Himalaya TV	Full HD	2010	Private	Kathmandu	Nationwide	समृद्धि र शान्तिको अभियान
News 24	SD	2010	Private	Kathmandu	Nationwide	
Mountain Television	HD	2010	Padma Group	Kathmandu	Nationwide	सत्य तथ्य तथा निसपक्क्ष समाचार
Nari Television	HD	2010	Private	Kathmandu	Nationwide	Empowering Women
Makalu TV	HD	2010	Private	Biratnagar	Nationwide	Localness, Development and Promotion
Himshikhar TV	HD	2011	Private	Damak – 6, Jhapa	Worldwide	शिक्षा, सूचना र मनोरन्जनको संबाहक
NTV News HD	HD	2014	Nepal Government	Kathmandu	Nationwide	
Nepalmandal Television	HD	2014	Private	Lalitpur, Nepal	Nationwide	
TV Today	HD	2015	Private	Pepsicola, Kathmandu	Worldwide	Dedicated for Development
Fewa Tv	HD	2015	Private	Pokhara, Kaski Nepal	Nationwide	
Janata Television	HD	2016	Janata Network	Kathmandu, Nepal	Worldwide	जनताद्वारा जनताका लागि प्रसारित
NTV Kohalpur	HD	2016	Nepal Government	Kohalpur, Banke	Nationwide	
Krishi Television	HD	2016	Private	Lalitpur, Nepal	Nationwide	Self-Respect of the farmers, helps to build the country for economic and Agricultural development
Pokhara Television	HD	2016	Private	Pokhara, kaski, Nepal	Nationwide	
AP1 TV	Full HD	2017	Annapurna Media Network	Kathmandu, Nepal	Worldwide	Nepal's first satellite HD television.
Business Plus Television	HD	2017	Padma Group	Kupondole, Lalitpur	Nationwide	
Mega television Nepal	HD	2017	Private	Kathmandu, Nepal	Nationwide	
Global TV	HD	2018	Kalinchowk Television Network Pvt.Ltd	Jana Marg, Kathmandu		
Prime Times Television	HD	2018	Private	Kathmandu	Nationwide	
Bhakti Darsan	HD	2018	Padma Group	Kathmandu, Nepal	Nationwide	
Bodhi Television	HD	2018	Private	Kathmandu, Nepal	Nationwide	Buddhism from Lumbini to the World
NTV Itahari	HD	2020	Nepal Government	Itahari, Sunsari	Nationwide	
Action Sports	Full HD	2021	Original Entertainment Pvt. Ltd	Kathmandu, Nepal	Nationwide	
NNTV	HD	2022	Private	Kathmandu, Nepal	WorldWide	The Media For Nation & Beyond
Space 4k Television	4k	2022	Galaxy Media Group Pvt. Ltd.	Mid Baneshwor, Kathmandu, Nepal	Worldwide	नेपालको पहिलो भ्रष्टाचार विरोधी टेलिभिजन
Kantipur Max	Full HD	2024	Kantipur Television Network Ltd	Kathmandu	Nationwide	
News Nepal Television	HD	2018	Private	Kathmandu, Nepal	Nationwide	
Public 4k Television	4k	2022		Pokhara	Nationwide	
Explore Nepal Television [EN TV]	HD	2025	Private	Pokhara, Nepal	Worldwide	First Satellite Television of Gandaki Pradesh
Kantipur Max 2	HD	2025	Kantipur Television Network Ltd	Kathmandu	Nationwide	

=== B. IPTV/ Web TV ===
Name	Quality	Est Date	Owner	Broadcast From	Region	Slogan
Arghakhanahchi TV	HD	2010	Private	Kathmandu	Nationwide	
Today TV Janakpur	HD	2015	Private	Janakpur	Local	
Saptakoshi Television	HD	2022	Private	Itahari	Nationwide	पुर्वको गौरब सप्तकोशी टेलीभिजन
Arena TV	HD	2014	Private	Itahari–8, Sunsari	Eastern Nepal	Media for Youth
Kaligandaki TV	HD	2014	Private	Kushma, Parbat	Dhaulagiri Zone	
Avass TV	HD	2013	Private	Chitwan	Chitwan, Nawalparasi, Makwanpur	
TV Trishuli	HD	2013	Private	Nuwakot		
Dhaulagiri TV	HD	2013	Private	Baglung Bazzar, Baglung	Dhaulagiri Zone	
Suryodaya TV	HD	2016	Suryodaya Tv & Media Pvt Ltd	Birtamod, Jhapa	Eastern Nepal	
Business TV Nepal	HD	2015	Private	Kathmandu, Nepal	Business TV	
Times TV	HD	2016	Private	Janakpur	Worldwide	सकारात्मक परिर्वतनका लागि प्रतिवद्ध
Yes Television	HD	2018	Private	Kathmandu, Nepal	Nationwide	
Spacelink	HD	2015	Private	Birtamode, Jhapa	Districtwise	
Mithila TV	HD	2019	Mithila Nepal Television Pvt. Ltd.	Kathmandu, Nepal	Worldwide	
Hamro Television	HD	2016	Private	Itahari, Sunsari	Nationwide	Sabaiko lagi Hamro
Karuwa TV	HD	2015	Private	Tansen, Nepal	Palpa, Gulmi, Arghakhachi	
Shreenagar Community Television	HD	2015	Public	Palpa, Nepal	Palpa	
Appan Television	HD	2015	Private	Janakpur	Nationwide	
Mero TV	HD	2017	Private	Tinkune, kathmandu	Nationwide	
Buddha Awaaz TV	HD	2017	Community	Kapilvastu	Nationwide	
J Music HD	HD	2016	Private	Baluwatar, Kathmandu, Nepal	Nationwide	
Omkar Television	HD	2019	Private	Kathmandu	Nationwide	
Indigenous Television	HD	2016	Private	Kathmandu	Nationwide	a multilingual Indigenous-led Community Television
Health Television	HD	2019	Private	Kathmandu	Nationwide	
Dibya Darshan Television	HD	2019	Shree Krishna Pranami Media Pvt. Ltd.	Koteshwor, Kathmandu	Nationwide	
Upahar TV	HD	2019	Private	Pepsicola, Kathmandu	Nationwide	Upahar Media Network Pvt. Ltd.
Triveni Television	HD	2013	Community	Nawalparasi	Districtwise	
TV Birgunj	HD	2020	Private	Birgunj, Nepal	Nationwide	
Namaste Nepal TV	HD	2020	Private	Birgunj, Nepal	Worldwide	
Zee Nepal TV	HD	2020	Private	Nepalgunj, Nepal	Nationwide	Owned and Operated by Awadh Media Group Pvt. Ltd.
Education Television	4k	2019	Private	Kathmandu, Nepal	Nationwide	Nepal's First Satellite Educational Tv Channel
City One Television	HD	2021	Private	Pokhara, kaski, Nepal	Nationwide	
ME TV	HD	2021	Private	Kathmandu, Nepal	Nationwide	
Panchali TV	HD	2021	Private	Kathmandu, Nepal	Cable Television	
Kalika TV	HD	2018	Private	Chitwan, Nepal	Nationwide	
Kishan TV	HD		Private		Nationwide	
Life OK	HD	2018	Private	Chappro, Kathmandu, Nepal	Nationwide	
Bhadgaun TV	HD	2018	Private	Suryabinayak, Bhaktapur	Nationwide	
Channel 4 Nepal	HD		Private		Nationwide	
Yoho Television	Full HD	2017	Private	Kathmandu, Nepal	Nationwide	
Sutra TV	HD	2012	Private		Nationwide	
Gorkha TV	HD	2018	Private	Jawalakhel, Lalitpur, Nepal	Nationwide	
Deep TV	HD	2020	Private	Pepsicola, Kathmandu, Nepal	Nationwide	सेवा, संस्कार र सत्सङ्ग को लागी दीप टेलिभिजन
Sarokar TV	HD	2019	Private	Anamnagar, Kathmandu	Nationwide	
I TV Nepal	HD		Private		Nationwide	
Nepa Channel	HD	2015	DELTA MULTIMEDIA PRODUCTION	Kathmandu, Nepal	Nationwide	
Hamro Television	HD	2016	Private	Itahri, Sunsari	Nationwide	Sabaiko lagi Hamro
Rajya TV	HD	2020	Suvigo Media Pvt Ltd	Butwal, Rupandehi		
Mission Star	HD		Private	Kathmandu	Nationwide	
National TV	HD		Private	Chabahil, Kathmandu	Nationwide	
Red TV	HD		Private	Rautahat		Rautahat district's 1st television
Newa TV	HD	2018	Private	Kathmandu	Kathmandu Valley	झीगु संस्कृति झीगु म्हसिका
BM HD	HD	2017	Budha Subba Digital Pvt.Ltd		Nationwide	
Araniko 1 TV	HD		Private	Old Baneshwor, Kathmandu	Nationwide	
Capital TV	HD		Private	New Baneshwor, Kathmandu	Nationwide	
Akash TV	HD		Private			
Moonlight TV	HD		Private	Kathmandu	Nationwide	
Sajha TV	HD		Private			
TV 1 Nepal	HD		TV Today Network	Pepsicola, Kathmandu	Nationwide	
Waling TV	HD	2018	Private	Waling, Syangja		
Subha Yatra TV	HD		Private			
Prithvi TV	HD		Private			
National Gold TV	HD	2020	Private	Hetauda	Nationwide	Hetauda's first HD Satellite channel
Deuti TV	HD	2018	Private	Surkhet		
Bhairahawa TV	HD	2017	Private	Siddharthanagar		
Saptarangi TV	HD	2017	Private	Ghoraho, Dang		
Rapti Darpan TV	HD	2014	Private	Dang, Rapti		
My TV	HD		Private			
Hamro Kisan	HD	2020	Private			
Bagmati TV	HD	2020	Private	Kathmandu	Bagmati Province	
DD TV Dhading	HD	2018	Private	Dhading Besi		
Indreni TV	HD	2016	Indreni Foundation	Buddhanagar, Kathmandu		
Aam Nepali TV	HD	2019	Private	Buddhanagar, Kathmandu		
Mstar TV	HD	2020	Maa dhamani media and entertainment pvt. ltd	Golbazar, Siraha		
Janasanchar TV	HD	2013	Community	Kamalbinayak, Bhaktapur		
Paryawaran TV	HD	2019	ECO Media Action	Godawari, Lalitpur		Nepal's first environment television
Prabhu TV	HD	2013	Prabhu Entertainment Pvt. Ltd	Kamaladi, Kathmandu		
City One TV	HD	2021	Star Nepal media hub PvT ltd.	Pokhara, kaski, Nepal		
Lumbini TV	HD	2019	Community	Butwal		Nepal's First Community Television Station
Laxmi TV	HD	2014	Private	Galyang, Syangja	Syangja	
Birat TV	HD	2018	Private	Itahari, Nepal		
Golden Eye TV	HD	2015	Private	Pokhara, kaski, Nepal		
Prabhu Movies	HD	2019	Prabhu Entertainment Pvt. Ltd	Kamaladi, Kathmandu		
Ramailo TV	HD	2018	Original Entertainment Pvt. Ltd	Kathmandu	Nationwide	
Reality TV	HD		DISH HOME NETWORKS	Kathmandu	Nationwide	
Plus Movie	HD	2012	DISH HOME NETWORKS	Kathmandu	Nationwide	
Gunjan TV	HD	2017	Suntharali media Pvt. Ltd	Kathmandu	Nationwide	
Cine Hits	HD		DISH HOME NETWORKS	Kathmandu	Nationwide	
DMovies	HD		DISH HOME NETWORKS	Kathmandu	Nationwide	
DMusic	HD		DISH HOME NETWORKS	Kathmandu	Nationwide	
Junior Tv	HD		DISH HOME NETWORKS	Kathmandu	Nationwide	
Rhymes	HD	2020	DISH HOME NETWORKS	Kathmandu	Nationwide	
Comedy Plus Nepal	HD		DISH HOME NETWORKS	Kathmandu	Nationwide	
Academy 1	HD		DISH HOME NETWORKS	Kathmandu	Nationwide	
Academy 2	HD		DISH HOME NETWORKS	Kathmandu	Nationwide	
Academy 3	HD		DISH HOME NETWORKS	Kathmandu	Nationwide	
Bidhyalaya Shikshya	HD		DISH HOME NETWORKS	Kathmandu	Nationwide	
Madesh Plus.	HD	2021	DISH HOME NETWORKS	Kathmandu	Nationwide	
Seven Star 4k TV	4k	2022	Extreme Television Pvt Ltd (Suresh Kalfe )	Kathmandu	Nationwide	

== List of television stations outside Nepal ==
Name	Est Date	Origin	Slogan
America Nepal Television	2012	Virginia, USA	नेपाली मन, नेपाली पन, नेपाली संस्कृति
White Himal TV	2011	Perth, Australia	Voice of Change
Sagarmatha Television	1997	USA	जननी जन्मभुमिश्व स्वर्गदपी गरियसी (Mother and Motherland are dearer than heaven)
My Nepal TV (MNTV)	2012	Sydney, Australia	
Nepali TV	2005	UK	
Global Nepal Television	2014	Hong Kong	
Voice of Nepal TV (VON TV)	2017	Portugal	तपाईंको खबर, हाम्रो समाचार
Gurkha Channel	2015	London, United kingdom	
Nepali Darwin TV (NDTV)	2021	Darwin, Australia	

== Defunct channels ==
Channel	SD/HD availability	Notes
Channel Nepal	SD	The channel was shut down after mob attacked the tv station after the murder of 12 Nepalese in Iraq.
Kantipur Cineplex HD	HD	Renamed as Kantipur Max HD
National Television	SD	National TV was shut down after its owner was arrested with fake Indian notes in Kathmandu. Its equipment was then sold to TV Filmy channel.
Galaxy 4K	4K HD	Galaxy 4K was management was unable to pay salarly for staff so without closing the channel it only telecast music for 2 weeks then after that it was permanently closed.
Nepal 1 tv	Very poor SD	Due to many issues Nepal 1 is not broadcast in territory of Nepal anymore. Nepal 1tv was established focusing the program for Nepal but it was an Indian channel operating from New Delhi. The channel was under controversy as Indian channel was using word 'Nepal'. Similarly there were salary issues payment for journalist in Kathmandu and owner of Nepal 1 went on controversy. The channel was then sold to another Indian media that runs APN TV in India. Now it has removed word 'Nepal' from logo but writes N1. It is carried only in India by cable operators and some DTH N1 now only runs programme in Hindi language. It has no any specific program and sometimes air Nepali songs from Nepali pop singers of Nepal.
TV Filmy	SD	Rebranded as NARI Television
Araniko TV	HD	Founded in 2013 and closed in 2024
Terai TV	HD	

== Internet TV ==
- Himal TV Australia
- Rural TV Nepal
- Voice of Nepal TV (VON)
- Saugat Tv
- Creative Blues TV
- Nepali Darwin TV (NDTV)

== See also ==
- List of programs broadcast by Nepal Television
- Nepal Television
- Image Channel
- MegaTelevision
- Nepal Network TV NNTV
- Kantipur Television
