= List of programs broadcast by Nepal Television =

Nepal Television is the state owned television corporation of Nepal. The list of programs run by it are as follows-

== Currently broadcast by Nepal Television ==
- Jhayai kuti jhayai
- Madan Bahadur Hari Bahadur 4
- Meri Bassai
- Sisnu Pani
- Tato Na Saro
- Tito Piro
- Virus
- Halka Ramailo

=== Kids ===
- Barbapapa
- Eureeka's Castle
- Khushiko Sansar (Happy World)
- Moomin
- Mr. Fantus
- Nature Calls
- Opening Children Programme
- Poppets Town
- Yvon of the Yukon
- Tom and Jerry

=== Drama ===
- Aphanta
- Guthi
- Santan
- Bharosha
- Sunaulo Sansar
- Yatra Jindagi Ko
- Singha Durbar
- Bhagya afno
- Gahana
- Karuna 2
- Parichay
- Parichay 2
- Jeevan Chakra
- Dear Jindagi

=== Game show ===
- Cham Chami
- Magical Thumb-A Live Game Show
- Pratibhako Aagan
- Singing Icon Nepal
- The Singing Star

=== Miscellaneous ===
- Artha ko Artha
- Krishi Karyakram
- Mero Ghar Mero Sansar
- Swasthya Charcha

=== News ===
- समाचार (Samachar Ntv) (8:00 pm)

=== Reality ===
- Maile Je Bhoge
- Sero Phero

== Formerly broadcast by Nepal Television ==
- Aayam
- Abhibyakti
- Biswo Ghatna
- Chintan Manan/Manthan
- Hamro Gaun Ramro Gaun
- Hijo Aaj Ka Kura
- Hostel
- Khel Khel
- Mayos Super Challenge
- Nagad Panch Lakh
- Nepali Tara
- Sanibar Vijay Kumar Sanga
- Pathvarsta
- Adrisya ghau
- Bishwas
- Mahabharat
- Ghar Pariwar
- Ghas khatne khurera ayo joban hukrera
- Bhaigoni tw
- Aama 2
- Good Morning Sir
- Lal Purja
- Bhoot
- Kaslai afno Bhanu
- BeliChameli
- S.L.C
- Jalpari
- Mamata
- Sankha
- Dashain ko Chahangra
- jhau kiri
- Ujalo tira ko
- Bhagwat geeta (Nepali Dubbed)
- Cham Chami
- utsarga
- Good Morning Sir
- Hari Bdr Madan Bdr ३
- Aama
- Lal Purja
- Thatta
- Twaka Tukka
- Vikram Aur Bettal (Nepali dubbed)
- ghaito maa ghaam
- jeevan Asha
- Devi 2
- 15 gate
- Bish
- Ujalo Tira ko
- Sunsnu pani jahaama
- Mann
- Jhajhalko
- DactoR Saab
- Bhumika
- Mashan
- Sangam
- Pratidondi
- kantipur
- Thorai bhaye pugi sari
- Sindoor
- afanta
- Adsiaaya ghau
- Ramayan (Nepali Version)
- Chandrakanta (Nepali Version)
- Shree krishna (Nepali version)
- Motu Patlu
- Apradh
- Dalan
- Bhishma pratigiya
- Son Pari (Nepali Version)
- Kakigandaki ko sero phero
- Abiral Bagdacha Inrawati
