= Udaan =

Udaan may refer to:

- Udaan (1997 film), a Hindi film
- Udaan (2010 film), a Hindi film
- Udaan (album), by Nepali singer Shweta Punjali (2015)
- Udaan (1989 TV series), DD National TV show
- Udaan (2014 TV series), Colors TV show
- Udaan Trust, Indian non-governmental organisation
- Udaan Campaign, an India government programme to support disadvantaged girls for admission to engineering colleges in India
- Udaan, the Hindi-dubbed version of the Tamil film Soorarai Pottru

== See also ==
- Uraan (disambiguation)
