= Bhadragol =

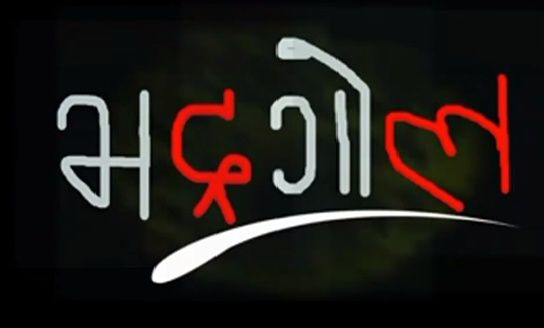
- Bhadragol
- Nepali: भद्रगोल
- .
- Genre: Sitcom; Drama
- Created by: Som Dhital
- Developed by: Media Hub Pvt. Ltd.
- Written by: Sankhar Acharya
- Story by: Jyoti Kafle; Ashok Dhital
- Directed by: Sankhar Acharya
- Creative director: Raju Bhujel
- Presented by: Media Hub Pvt. Ltd.
- Starring: Ashok Dhital; Jyoti Kafle; Raju Bhujel; Sujit Thapa; Ram Budathoki; Radha Shrestha; Suman Jyoti Neupane; Sabeen Niraula; Ajay Shrestha
- Opening theme: "Bhadragol"
- Ending theme: "Bhadragol"
- Country of origin: Nepal
- Original language: Nepali
- No. of episodes: 227

Production
- Producer: Media Hub Pvt. Ltd.
- Production locations: Kathmandu, Nepal
- Editors: Rajendra Manandhar; Rabin Bhatta
- Camera setup: Multi-camera
- Running time: 30 minutes (approx)

Original release
- Network: NTV
- Release: October 2, 2013 – present

Bhadragol is a Nepali sitcom that airs every Friday at 8:50 pm NST on Nepal Television. It was one of the most viewed television programs in Nepal. But the popularity of show has declined dramatically with almost new set of characters and team members in the show. The show was formerly produced by Subash Karki and then Media Hub Pvt. Ltd. produced the show. Jyoti Kafle and Ashok Dhital are the writers and the directors of the show. The story is based on village life. The main cast left the show due to some misunderstandings and started another one called-'Sakkigoni' with the recurring cast playing the same roles in entirely other but similar village where alike events happen. This show after the event was halted for a month and aired again with nearly entire new cast to negative reviews. This show has aired to huge views on Youtube Platform for about 3–4 years.

== Characters ==
Pade and Jigri's team members are working in bhadragol but now they work on a different Nepali serial, Sakkigoni.

== Background ==
Before Bhadragol, comedians Arjun Ghimire and Kumar Kattel worked on the NTV comedy series Sisnu Pani Jhyammai, which ran for 18 episodes and later influenced the development of Bhadragol.

== Cast ==
- Arjun Ghimire (Padey)
- Kumar Kattel (Jigri)
- Shankar Acharya (Baristhe)
- Kamalmani Nepal (Khupika Bau)
- Dipak Acharya (Kaku)
- CP Pudasaini (Dhature)
- Sagar Lamsal (Bale)
- Hari Niraula (Cockroach)
- Rakshya Shrestha (Rakshya)
- Govinda Koirala (Jayante)
- Madhusudan Pathak (Site Ba)
- Priyana Acharya (Munni)
- Shaan Niroula
- Sabeen Niraula ( pandit baje)
- Sita Devi Ghimire

== See also ==
- Sakkigoni
- Hakka Hakki
- Meri Bassai
- Jire khursani
- Sisnopani / Sisnupani Jhyammai
