= Ankit Babu Adhikari =

Nepalese Musician and Author

Ankit Babu Adhikari अंकित बाबु अधिकारी
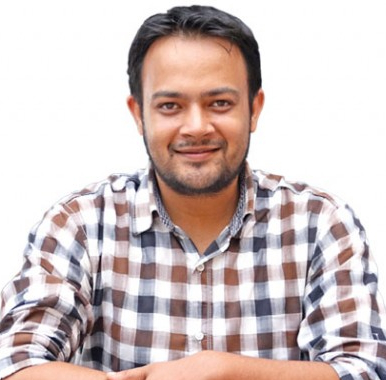

Background information
- Born: 22 January 1991 (age 35); Tulsipur, Dang
- Genres: Sufi, Semi-classical music, Fusion
- Occupations: Singer, Composer, Songwriter, Author
- Instrument: Guitar
- Years active: 2014 - present
- Award: Tenzing-Hillary Award (2025)
- Website: ankitbabuadhikari.com

Ankit Babu Adhikari (Nepali: अंकित बाबु अधिकारी) is a Nepalese author, musician, singer and lyricist from Kathmandu. He is the co-author of Sherpa: Stories of Life and Death from the Forgotten Guardians of Everest, a narrative non-fiction and oral history of Sherpas.

== Music ==
Ankit started his musical career by composing and performing songs for a post-modern play Coma; A Political Sex staged at Shilpee Theatre, Kathmandu in 2014. His another major milestone includes his solo concert organised in tribute to Narayan Gopal. In 2014-15 he made it to Nepali Tara after which he gained wider audience throughout Nepal and abroad. His first original release is Ram Naam, a song that questions the physical existence of God; that was critically acclaimed in Nepal. He continued his experiment in a 2016 release Nau Futey Bhoot (9 ft. ghost), a song about Indian Blockade in Nepal, for which the Japan-based magazine The Diplomat named him Nepal's Singing Storyteller. His major hits include Ram Naam (2015), Nau Futey Bhoot (2016), K Maya Lagchha Ra, a 2020 musicial by Ankit, sung by Nishan Bhattarai and Eleena Chauhan, Yakthungma Kanchhi (duet with Sunita Thegim released in 2020), Binayo Bhakaile (2021), Dilruwa (2025), among others.

=== Dr Govinda K.C Anthem ===
Ankit has released an anthem for Dr Govinda K.C. while he was in his 11th hunger-strike against Nepal's medical mafia. The song contributed to mass campaigns to his support on social media. The song Ma Govinda Banchu (I will be Govinda) explains what it means to be like Dr. Govinda K.C.

== Journalist ==
He was a journalist with The Kathmandu Post and The Himalayan Times before switching into music. At the age of 19, he started his career as a correspondent covering crime, security, history and human rights. Before coming into music full-time, he was a copy-editor. He is also a co-producer of the critically acclaimed documentary Looking The Un-eyed Way. Produced with Pradeep Bashyal and Kumar Paudel, the documentary featured Deurupa Pandey, a 75-year-old blind woman from a village in the hills of Syangja district, who lived alone creating wonders about herself.

== Award and recognition ==
In 2024, OnlineKhabar included the name of Ankit Babu Adhikari on the "40 under 40" influential youths list.

In 2025, he was awarded the Tenzing-Hillary Award by the Government of Nepal for his contribution to promoting mountaineering and mountain tourism through the book Sherpa: Stories of Life and Death from the Forgotten Guardians of Everest.

== See also ==
- Bipul Chettri
- Deepak Limbu
