= Shweta Punjali =

Shweta Punjali श्वेता पुँजाली
- Born: Shweta Punjali; 1984 (age 41–42)
- Origin: Kathmandu, Nepal
- Genres: Bhajan, Nepali Classical, Nepali Adhunik, Pop, Indipop
- Occupation: Singer
- Instrument: Vocals
- Years active: 2014–present
- Label: Shweta Punjali
- Website: www.shwetapujali.com

Shweta Punjali is a Nepali musician, well known for her debut album Udaan a number of songs from which were nominated at various national music awards. She is also the winner of the Best New Talent award at the 2016 Nepali Music Video Award and was a nominee for Best Newcomer at the 2015 Tuborg Image Awards.

She sings primarily Nepali Adhunik, a style of singing marked by traditional melodies from the South Asian nation but with an influence of western instruments such as electric piano, guitar, violin and percussion. She also sings bhajan and Nepali classical songs.

Shweta was also a top contestant on a number of national music reality shows Nepali Tara (second season) and Bagina.

== Singing style and training ==
Shweta Punjali is primarily a Nepali Adhunik (Nepali modern/contemporary) singer and her songs generally use western musical instruments such as the keyboard, guitar, violin and percussion.

In addition to singing in Nepali language, she also sings religious (bhajans) and classical Hindi, Bengali and Pakistani Punjabi and Urdu songs. She also sings western pop and Indipop.

She has trained under the highly respected music teacher Gurudev Kamat at the Nepal Music Centre in both classical and contemporary styles of Nepali singing.

== Career ==
=== Reality TV ===
==== Nepali Tara ====
In 2006, Shweta Punjali auditioned for, and was selected as a contestant for the second season of Nepali Tara. She progressed through the competition, reaching the top-20 and then top-10 stages. Until the top-10 stage, decisions on retention or elimination were taken by a panel of judges however, once reaching the top-10, these decisions were taken through popular voting sent in through mobile short messages (SMS).

Shweta was eliminated at rank 7, becoming just one of three female singers to reach the top-10 and the highest ranked female singer that year.

Her song, Ko Pase Chha, composed by noted musician Deepak Jangam and featured in the special Close Up Nepali Tara 2 – Top 10 music CD, was among the top most listened songs for that season. While a contestant at Nepali Tara, Shweta performed in numerous Nepali towns and cities, including Pokhara, Dharan, Biratnagar, Butwal, Nepalgunj and Surkhet. She also performed at the finale for that season that saw Santosh Lama win the contest.

==== Bagina ====
Shweta was also a contestant on the Nepali classical music reality show Bagina in 2005. The show aired on Nepal's national TV channel, Nepal TV.

=== Singing ===
==== Debut album – Udaan ====
On 4 April 2015, Shweta Punjali launched her debut album Udaan (translated: Taking Flight) in the Nepal capital Kathmandu's Theatre Village. The album was launched by renowned singer Deep Shrestha and the event was attended by the who's who of Nepal's music scene.

The album was also simultaneously launched on iTunes Store, Google Play Music, Amazon Music, Spotify, Deezer and other online music stores. Udaan was also the first mainstream Nepali music album (fully produced in Nepal) to be released online to a global audience.

Udaan includes six songs, all of which are written by noted Nepali poet Durga Lal Shrestha and composed by master composer Nhyoo Bajracharya.

Several songs from Udaan have been nominated for top national music awards, including at the 2015 Tuborg Image Music Awards and the 2016 Nepali Music Video Award.

Shweta won the Best New Talent award at the 2016 edition of Nepali Music Video Award for her song Achamma Lagyo Malai from Udaan.

==== Second album ====
In October 2015, Shweta Punjali announced that she was working on her second album, which would include songs written by Durga Lal Shrestha and Nepali poet and philosopher Viplob Pratik, and music composed by Nhyoo Bajracharya.

Some of the songs featuring in this album include Aau Na Aau, Maile Palasha and Dekhnu Timilai.

==== Singles ====
Shweta Punjali has also released few singles by herself or in collaboration with other artists and musicians. Two prominent singles include: Sanchi Mero, a bhajan-inspired song, written by Ratna Shamsher Thapa and composed by Prabhu Raj Dhakal; and Ko Pase Chha, written by Gita Pantha and composed by Deepak Jangam.

=== Concerts ===
In addition to performing at various towns and cities of Nepal, Shweta Punjali has also performed in Bangkok, Thailand and in New York City, Connecticut State, United States of America, and performed with musicians such as Nhyoo Bajracharya and singers like Babu Bogati.

== Discography and awards ==
Album or Single	Year	Song	Composer(s)	Writer(s)	Award or Nomination
Ko Pase Chha (Single)	2007	Ko Pase Chha	Deepak Jangam	Gita Pantha	
Udaan	2015	Kasto Bhet	Nhyoo Bajracharya	Durga Lal Shrestha	Best Newcomer (Nominated, 2015 Tuborg Image Music Award)
Udaan	2015	Achammai Lagyo Malai	Nhyoo Bajracharya	Durga Lal Shrestha	Best New Artist (Winner, 2016 Nepali Music Award)
Udaan	2015	Achammai Lagyo Malai	Nhyoo Bajracharya	Durga Lal Shrestha	Best Music (Nominated, 2016 Nepali Music Award)
Udaan	2015	Bato Herirahechhu	Nhyoo Bajracharya	Durga Lal Shrestha	Best Music Video – Diaspora (Nominated, 2016 Nepali Music Award)
Udaan	2015	Aaja Malai	Nhyoo Bajracharya	Durga Lal Shrestha	
Udaan	2015	Sanghuro Bho Bato Mero	Nhyoo Bajracharya	Durga Lal Shrestha	
Udaan	2015	Haraunchhu Ma	Nhyoo Bajracharya	Durga Lal Shrestha	
Sanchai Mero (Single)	2015	Sanchai Mero	Prabhu Raj Dhakal	Ratna Shamsher Thapa	
To be announced	2016	Aau Na Aau	Nhyoo Bajracharya	Durga Lal Shrestha	
To be announced	2016	Dekhnu Timilai	Nhyoo Bajracharya	Durga Lal Shrestha	
To be announced	2016	Maile Palasha	Nhyoo Bajracharya	Viplob Pratik	

== Documentaries and films ==
Documentary/Film	Year	Type	Role	Note
Under the Blue Helmet: Life as a UN Peacekeeper	2018	Short documentary	Voice over for Nirmala Kambang	Uncredited

== Personal life ==
Shweta Punjali originally hails from the Nepali hill district of Arghakhanchi. She was born in Palpa and grew up in Pokhara and Bhairahawa before moving to Kathmandu for her master's degree at the Kathmandu University School of Management.

It was at this school that she met her future husband, Vibhu Mishra. They married in 2008. The couple moved to Bangkok, Thailand, in May 2012 and from there to New York City, USA in June 2016. They have one son, Vivaan Ajay, as well as a daughter, Simrik Punjali Mishra.

Vibhu also features in the music video of Shweta's song Bato Heri Rahechhu.
