= Pradeep Bashyal =

- Native name: प्रदीप बस्याल
- Born: 13 October 1991 (age 34) Manigram, Lumbini Province, Nepal
- Occupation: Journalist, writer
- Language: Nepali, English
- Notable awards: Tenzing-Hillary Award

Website
- www.pradeepbashyal.com

Pradeep Bashyal (Nepali: प्रदीप बस्याल) is a Nepali journalist and author based in Kathmandu. He currently works with the BBC. His debut book Sherpa: Stories of Life and Death from the Forgotten Guardians of Everest was published with his long-time collaborator Ankit Babu Adhikari. In 2025, the Government of Nepal awarded him the Tenzing-Hillary Award. In 2024, Online Khabar named Bashyal one of its 40 most influential youths under 40 years old.

== Career ==
Prior to joining the BBC, he worked with Nepal Magazine first as a correspondent and later as a digital editor. His articles have appeared in The Washington Post, Buzzfeed News, and The Diplomat.
