= Sherpa (book) =

2022 non-fiction book

Sherpa: Stories of Life and Death from the Forgotten Guardians of Everest
- Cover of Hardcover Edition
- Author: Pradeep Bashyal and Ankit Babu Adhikari
- Audio read by: Homer Todiwala
- Language: British English
- Subject: Everest, Sherpas
- Genre: non-fiction, Narrative
- Set in: Nepal, India
- Publisher: Octopus Publishing Group
- Publication date: 28 July 2022
- Publication place: United Kingdom
- Media type: Print (hardcover & paperback), Audiobook and e-book
- Pages: 336
- ISBN: 978-1788403320

Sherpa: Stories of Life and Death from the Forgotten Guardians of Everest is a 2022 narrative non-fiction book by Nepali authors Pradeep Bashyal and Ankit Babu Adhikari. It was first published by Cassel, an imprint of Octopus Publishing Group, UK on 28 July 2022. The book is an oral history that unveils the untold stories of Sherpas, shedding light on their extraordinary mountaineering triumphs and tragedies. It was shortlisted for the 2023 Boardman Tasker Prize for Mountain Literature. The authors were awarded the Tenzing-Hillary Award by Government of Nepal in recognition of this book in 2025.

== Synopsis ==
Sherpa recounts the tales of Sherpas, exploring their struggles and perseverance on Everest. It delves into their lives and recounts how they live on the edge of life and death. The book covers the period from the 1930s and 1940s, with the first-generation climbing Sherpas, and the key Sherpa hubs of Khumbu, Rolwaling, Makalu, and Darjeeling. Through the stories of dozens of characters, the authors explore the act of climbing, as well as the life, culture, myths, and religions that have shaped Sherpa lives for generations.

== Reception ==
The Telegraph wrote in its review that "the human-centric stories of Sherpas aren't told with as much sensitivity, candour, and creativity as they're in Sherpa." The Times Literary Supplement called it "the first English-language book devoted to these remarkable people." The Spectator wrote that "sherpas may once have been the dogsbodies in other people's adventures but today they are the heroes – and, increasingly, heroines – of their own story." The Hindu asks readers to "the next time you hear of someone summitting [sic] Mt. Everest, spare a thought for the one that made it possible." Dawn newspaper wrote "packing in plenty of information about what goes on behind the scenes of a summiting expedition, Bashyal and Adhikari's book gives credit where it is due." The Kathmandu Post writes that the book "brilliantly portrayed a moving human side of people performing the world's deadliest job."

Nepali Times writes: Sherpa "attempts to go behind the climbs to portray the lives, dreams, and destinies of the people who have made their surname and ethnicity a word for ‘support crew’ in the English language dictionary." The reviewer of Business Standard wrote: "In describing them as 'forgotten guardians of Everest', the authors remind us of the worth of these mostly unacknowledged enablers behind those triumphal headlines of this or that person summiting Everest each year." Annapurna Post wrote that "every chapter reads like a documentary film" whereas Online Khabar says it is a "great history lesson for both Nepalis and foreigners." The Conversation wrote: "They entwine the climbers’ stories of achievement and disaster on the mountains with tales of family struggles off the mountain."The Annapurna Express reviews the book as "an engaging work of storytelling that adds to the body of work on Everest, which already includes Wade Davis’ ‘Into the Silence’ and Jon Krakauer's ‘Into Thin Air’."

== Translation ==
It was translated into Italian as Sherpa: I Custodi Dell’Everest by Clara Mazzi and published by Corbaccio, a publisher based in Milan, in 2023. In the Czech language it was published as Šerpové – Příběhy skutečných vládců Everestu by Alpress Publishing House based in Frydek-Mistek in 2024.
