= Uraan =

Uraan may refer to:

- Uraan (1995 TV series), a Pakistani drama series on PTV
- Uraan (2010 TV series), a Pakistani drama series on Geo Entertainment
- Uraan (2020 TV series), a Pakistani drama series on Geo Entertainment
- Uraan, an Indian Bengali-language drama series on Star Jalsha
- Uraan Pakistan or National Economic Transformation Plan 2024–29, Pakistan government initiative

== See also ==
- Udaan (disambiguation)
