= Twakka Tukka Returns =

Nepali sitcom

- Also known as: ट्वाक्क टुक्का रेतुर्न्स and TTR
- Genre: Comedy
- Starring: Dinesh D.C. Gopal Dhakal; Janak Khadka; Mahadev Tripathi
- Opening theme: Farke yo Twakka Tukka
- Ending theme: Farke yo Twakka Tukka
- Country of origin: Nepal
- Original language: Nepali
- No. of seasons: 1
- No. of episodes: 32

Production
- Production location: Nepal
- Running time: 17 minutes to 45 minutes

Original release
- Network: Kantipur Television
- Release: 24 October 2016

Twakka Tukka Returns is a Nepali sitcom which airs in Kantipur Television Network every Friday. This sitcom features Dinesh D C as a host he tells what is going to happen next on the show.

The program is based on the original comedy series Twakka Tukka popular in 1990s aired by the Nepal Television.

== Cast ==
- Dinesh D.C. as host
- Mahadev Tripathi as Premcharo and Jadugar
- Sivashankhar Rijal as Jogindar
- Surendra KC as Mulako Sag
- Gopal Dhakal as Chhande and Mr Funny
- Sushila Niraula as Bimli
- Prem Pandey
- Ashim Suresh
- Janak Khadka as an Actor/Writer and Chief Assistant Director
- Giri Raj
- Yesoda Giri
- Binod Pariyar
