= All Three Media Ghar =

Media production company based in Kathmandu

All Three Media Ghar. Pvt. Ltd.
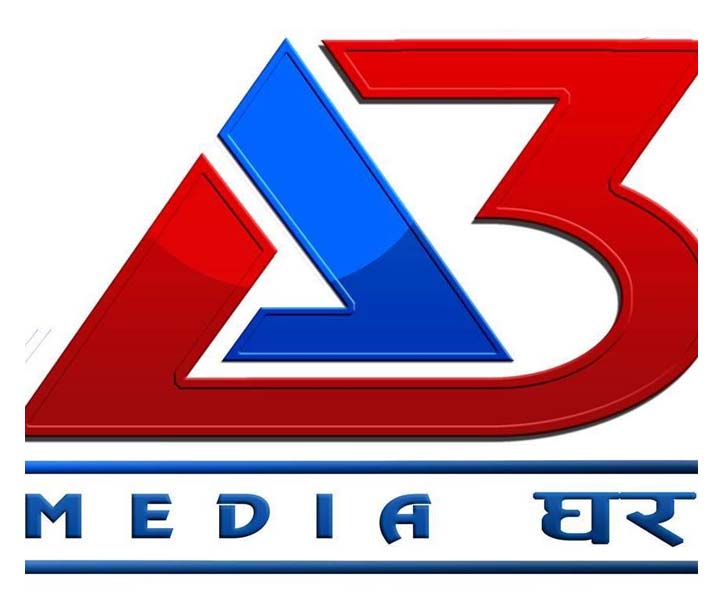
- Status: Active
- Founded: 2013
- Country of origin: Nepal
- Headquarters location: Bagbazar, Kathmandu
- Key people: Sunil Koirala
- Official website: a3mediaghar.com.np

All Three Media Ghar is a Nepali private media production company located in Kathmandu. It is operated by TV journalists Sunil Koirala, Ananda Poudel, and Shiva Shrestha. It mainly produces programs and documentaries in English, Nepali, and in the other regional languages of Nepal. The company started as a media production company in January 2014. It is a service-oriented media house established with the objective to promote and provide full-service communication development including branding products and services, strategies, development, and production of research-based IEC/BCC materials.

== Television programs ==
- Surakshit Samudaya
- Baliyo Ghar

== Production team ==
- Executive producer: Sunil Koirala
- Visual editor: Sanam Shrestha
- Program producer: Shiva Shrestha
- Program coordinator: Ananda Poudel
- Associate Producer: Mimraj Pandeya
- Camera person: Ratnamani Dahal
- Marketing representative: Naresh Adhikari
