= Ditha Sab =

- Nepali: डिठ्ठा साब
- Genre: Comedy; Drama
- Written by: Kishor Bhandari
- Directed by: Kishor Bhandari
- Opening theme: "Ditha Sab"
- Composer: (team of the show)
- Country of origin: Nepal
- Original language: Nepali

Production
- Production location: Nepal
- Running time: 30 minutes
- Production company: Kantipur Television Network

Original release
- Network: KTV
- Release: present

Ditha Sab is a comedy serial on Kantipur Television mainly focused on entertaining the audiences with light rural humor with high demand on YouTube as well.

== Cast of Ditha Sab ==
- Kishor Bhandari
- Reshma Timilsina
- Raju Comedy

== Crew of Ditha Sab ==
- Writer / Director : 'Kishor Bhandari'
