= Sakkigoni =

Nepali TV series

- Title screen of the show
- Nepali: सक्किगोनि
- Genre: Sitcom; Drama
- Screenplay by: Arjun Ghimire; Kumar Kattel
- Directed by: Arjun Ghimire; Kumar Kattel
- Creative director: Deepak Acharya
- Presented by: OSR Digital
- Starring: Arjun Ghimire, Kumar Kattel, Sagar Lamsal, Priyana Acharya, CP Pudasaini, Subodh Gautam, Shankhar Acharya, Rashmi Pandey, Rakshya Shrestha, Hari Niraula, Ram Bhajan Kamat, Purushottam Acharya, Deepak Acharya, Kamalmani Nepal, Madhusudhan Pathak, Govinda Koirala, Sita Devi Ghimire, Sabeen Niraula Rabi Khanal
- Theme music composer: Arjun Pokharel
- Opening theme: "Sakkigoni"
- Ending theme: "Sakkigoni"
- Country of origin: Nepal
- Original language: Nepali
- No. of seasons: 3
- No. of episodes: 58

Production
- Executive producer: Usha Poudel
- Cinematography: Gokul Adhikari; Sudip Baral
- Editor: Rajendra Manandhar
- Camera setup: Multi-camera
- Running time: 40-50 minutes (approx.)

Original release
- Network: Nepal Television (2019–2020); Himalaya TV (2020 – present)
- Release: 19 September 2019 – present

Sakkigoni is a Nepali TV series that airs every Thursday on Himalaya TV at 8:00 pm. It is one of the most popular television programs in Nepal. The producers are JPT Creation Pvt Ltd. Kumar Kattel with Arjun Ghimire as the writer and director of the show. The story is based on the rural lifestyle of lower-middle-class people. The show stars Arjun Ghimire, Kumar Kattel, Rakshya Shrestha, Hari Niraula, and Sagar Lamsal as the main characters.

The show, originally airing on Nepal Television, was halted in March 2020 due to the COVID-19 pandemic. In November 2020, it was announced that the show would return on 10 December 2020, now airing on Himalaya TV was airing on OSR Digital's official YouTube channel now it airing on JPT Creation official YouTube channel 8:30 pm.

Season 3 started on 25 May 2023.

== Cast ==
- Kumar Kattel (Jigri)
- Kamalmani Nepal (Khupika Bau)
- Dipak Acharya (Kaku)
- Sagar Lamsal (Bale)
- Harish Niraula (Cockroach)
- Rakshya Shrestha (Rakshya)
- Govinda Koirala (Jayante)
- Madhusudan Pathak (Site Ba)
- Subodh Gautam (Edume)
- Rashmi Pandey (Makuri.)
- Priyana Acharya (Munni)
- Sita Devi Ghimire (Chandramukhi )
- Kabiraj Bham (Mantha)
- Sanjita Pandey (Sanu)
- Bhawana Acharya (Luri)
- Purushottam Acharya (police)
- Sabeen Niraula (Pasale Bhai)

== Creative team ==
- Special guest appearance: Badri Pangeni
- Cinematographer: Gokul Adhikari / Sudip Baral
- Editor: Rajendra Manandhar
- Executive producer: Usha Poudel Rijal
- Series direction: Deepak Acharya
- Story/screenplay/dialogue/direction: Arjun Ghimire, Kumar Kattel

== Controversy ==
In October 2019, Som Dhital, producer of the Nepali sitcom Bhadragol, filed a complaint with the Metropolitan Police Crime Range, Teku, against the Sakkigoni team, many of whom had formerly worked on his series. Previously he had instructed the team not to produce a new series that included any characters or plotlines similar to those from his sitcom. Additionally, Dhital told the media that if another series with identical content were to run on the same television network, it would severely affect Bhadragol. Writer Kumar Kattel and actor Arjun Ghimire rejected the allegations, stating that the agreement between Media Hub and JPT Creation had stated that after 2076 Ashadh (June–July 2019) the rights related to the characters and plotlines would be released to the second party, JPT Creation.
