= Baliyo Ghar Surakshit Nepal =

- Genre: Weekly TV Programme
- Created by: All Three Media Ghar
- Presented by: Sunil Koirala
- Country of origin: Nepal
- Original language: Nepali
- No. of episodes: 65

Production
- Producer: All Three Media Ghar
- Production locations: Yeti Plaza, Bagbazar, Kathmandu, Nepal
- Editor: Sanam Shrestha
- Running time: half an hour

Original release
- Network: Kantipur Television
- Release: May 31, 2016 – present

Baliyo Ghar (बलियो घर, transl. Strong house) is a Nepali television series; focused on the safer reconstruction of Nepal, after the April 2015 Nepal earthquake. It first began airing on May 31, 2016, on 4 leading national TV channels; Kantipur Television, News 24 (Nepal), Image Channel and Avenues Television weekly 3 times from each.

It has also been a platform for learning, sharing and advocating for safer reconstruction. Baliyo Ghar covers diverse issues of reconstruction policy to technology to local practice and various phase and aspect of reconstruction processes.

With the funding support from USAID, The NSET and All Three Media Ghar air this program.

== Production Team ==
- Host : Sunil Koirala
- Episode Producer : Mimraj Pandeya
- Visual Editor : Santosh Dawadi
- Program coordinator : Ananda Poudel
- Camera Person : Ratnamani Dahal & Kumar Katwal
