= Gurudev Kamat =

- Born: August 1, 1955; Pokharbhinda, Siraha District, Nepal
- Died: August 1, 2024 (aged 69) Pokharbhinda, Laxmipur Patari, Siraha District, Nepal
- Genres: Hindustani classical, ghazal, folk
- Occupations: Singer, composer, music educator
- Instruments: Vocals, harmonium
- Years active: 1984–2024
- Awards: Prabal Janasewa Shree; Mithila Ratna; Madhesh Ratna

Gurudev Kamat (1 August 1955 – 1 August 2024) was a prominent Nepali classical musician, singer, and music teacher. Over a career spanning four decades, he recorded more than 300 songs in the Nepali, Maithili, and Hindi languages, composed numerous musical pieces, and trained thousands of apprentices in Hindustani classical music. In recognition of his contributions to the musical landscape of Nepal, he was awarded the Prabal Janasewa Shree, one of the country's highest civilian honors.

== Early life and education ==
Kamat was born on 1 August 1955 in Pokharbhinda, a village located in the Laxmipur Patari Rural Municipality of the Siraha District, Nepal. He demonstrated an interest in music from the age of ten. To pursue formal musical training, he moved to India, studying classical music in Allahabad and West Bengal, where he ultimately earned a master's degree in classical music.

== Career ==
Kamat returned to Nepal from India in 1989 (2046 BS). Three years later, in 1992, he gained prominent national recognition after winning a nationwide singing competition organized by Radio Nepal.

Following his initial success, Kamat relocated to Kathmandu, where he lived and worked for approximately 40 years. During this period, he became a central figure in the preservation and promotion of classical and semi-classical music in Nepal. He taught music for a significant duration at the Doremi Music School in Kathmandu. Later in his career, he established and operated his own institution, the Gurukul Sangeet Pathshala, where he trained thousands of students in classical vocal techniques.

As a recording artist, Kamat lent his voice to over 300 tracks encompassing classical ragas, modern ghazals, and traditional folk music across the Maithili, Nepali, Bhojpuri, and Hindi languages. He also composed music for more than a dozen musical projects. Some of his most well-regarded recorded songs include:

- Timi Nai Bhana
- Prem Ko Nasha
- Nishthuri Nishthuri
- Yaad Piya Ki Aaye
- Kun Papile

== Awards and recognition ==
For his extensive work as an educator and performer, Kamat received several prestigious state and regional honors:

- Prabal Janasewa Shree – Conferred by the Government of Nepal, standing as one of the nation's highest civilian decorations.
- Mithila Ratna – Awarded for his significant contributions to Maithili art and culture.
- Madhesh Ratna – Awarded by regional authorities for his contributions to the cultural heritage of the Madhesh Province.

== Personal life and death ==
Kamat was married and had three sons and one daughter.

In his later years, Kamat was diagnosed with severe kidney disease. Due to financial constraints arising from the cost of long-term medical treatments in Kathmandu, he and his family returned to his birthplace in Siraha in mid-2024. He continued to receive regular dialysis treatments at the Provincial Hospital in Lahan and at his home.

Kamat died from kidney failure at his residence in Pokharbhinda, Siraha, on 1 August 2024, on his 69th birthday. Following his demise, the provincial government of Madhesh ordered the national flag to be flown at half-mast to honor his cultural legacy.
