= NTV Plus (Nepali TV channel) =

- Country: Nepal
- Broadcast area: Nepal and abroad
- Headquarters: Singha Durbar, Kathmandu, Nepal

Programming
- Language(s): Nepali (Primary); Maithili (Secondary); Newari (Regional); English (International)
- Picture format: 4:3 (576i, SDTV, HDTV)

Ownership
- Owner: Government of Nepal
- Sister channels: NTV (Nepal Television), NTV News, NTV Kohalpur; NTV Itahari

History
- Launched: 2003

Links
- Website: NTV Plus

Availability

Terrestrial
- Analogue: VHF band

NTV Plus is a television channel in Nepal. NTV Plus is one of the five program divisions of Nepal Television that was established to serve a different objective than its other divisions. Transmission of the channel started in 2003. Currently, NTV Plus broadcasts 24 hours a day and 7 days a week.

NTV Plus was set up with the vision to reach out to the youth population through its wide range of programs, including entertainment, informative and sports programs. Embracing sheer professionalism, while pursuing its aspiration the channel in a very short span of time has succeeded in garnering immense affection of viewers.

In addition to the aforementioned programs, the broadcasting of other programs like the FIFA World Cup in football, the Olympic Games, various national and international level sporting events has further helped the channel attract the youth viewers. As per the set objectives, more than 70% of the programs broadcast on NTV Plus are entertainment based (that includes musicals and tele-films/soaps) while 20% of the programs comprises informative, sports based and others. NTV Plus has also been broadcasting a live musical program on a daily basis.

The channel is currently transmitted through satellite and terrestrial (currently through 5 terrestrial centers). The channel can also be viewed online around the world. NTV Plus aims at establishing additional terrestrial centers in the near future. At present, 40% of the current Nepali population and 27% of the territorial area of Nepal have an easy access to NTV Plus.

== List of programs broadcast by Nepal Television PLUS ==
- Nepali language programs
- Maithili Drama Shows
- English Documentaries

=== Reality ===
- Mero Dance Universe
- Namaste TV Show
- Wai Wai Quiz
- Maithili Subhaprabhab
- Young Achievers

=== Past programs ===
- Play It On
- Namaste Tv Show
- Kakigandaki ko Sero Phero
- Aabiral Bagdacha Indrawati

== Current tele serial ==
- Kakigandaki ko Sero Phero (Repeat)
  Sunday-Thursday-9:30pm
- Aabiral Bagdacha Indrawati (Repeat)
  Thursday & Friday-9.00pm

== Personnel ==
- Sangita Panta Thapa, Senior Producer and Host

== See also ==
- Nepal Television
- List of Nepali television stations
