= Surakshit Samudaya =

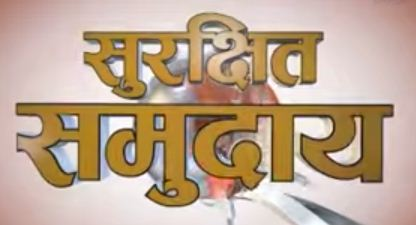
- Genre: Weekly Programme
- Created by: All Three Media Ghar Pvt. Ltd.
- Presented by: Sabina Kiorala
- Country of origin: Nepal
- Original language: Nepali

Production
- Producer: All Three Media Ghar Pvt. Ltd.
- Production locations: Baghbazar Kathmandu, Nepal
- Editor: Sanam Shrestha
- Running time: Approx. 10 minutes

Original release
- Network: News 24 (Nepal)
- Release: November 26, 2014 – December 26, 2015

Surakshit Samudaya (Nepali: सुरक्षित समुदाय) is a Nepalese television magazine related to earthquake preparedness and disaster risk management. It is financially supported by the National Society For Earthquake Technology - Nepa and produced by All Three Media Ghar Pvt. Ltd. and broadcast on News24 TV every Saturday at 5:45 pm and repeated at midnight.

== Production team ==
- Chief program producer : Sunil Koirala
- Visual editor : Sanam Shrestha
- Program producer : Shiva Shrestha
- Program co-ordinator : Ananda Poudel
- Presenter : Sabina Kiorala
- Reporter : Mimraj Pandeya
- Camera operator : Ratnamani Dahal
- Office assistant : Naresh Adhikari
