= It's My Show with Suraj Singh Thakuri =

It's My Show with Suraj Singh Thakuri is a talk show broadcast by Kantipur Television, hosted by Suraj Singh Thakuri.

== List of Episodes ==
Season 1

No	Guest(s)	Telecast Date	Note
S1E1	Yogeshwar Amatya & Nikita Chandak	16 December 2017	
S1E2	Priyanka Karki & Laure (Ashish Rana)	23 December 2017	
S1E3	Nischal Basnet & Dharmendra Sewang	30 December 2017	
S1E4	Deepak Raj Giri & Sabita Karki	06 January 2018	
S1E5	Robin Tamang & Oshin Sitaula	13 January 2018	
S1E6	Satyaraj Acharya & Swastima Khadka	20 January 2018	
S1E7	Priti Sitoula, Malvika Subba & Sareeta Shri Gyawali	27 January 2018	
S1E8	Nattu Shah & Mohan "Tattoo" Gurung	03 February 2018	
S1E9	Paras Khadka & Raju Lama	10 February 2018	
S1E10	Deepak Bista & Swoopna Suman	17 February 2018	
S1E11	1974 AD	23 February 2018	
S1E12	Gagan Thapa & Deepa Shree Niraula	03 March 2018	
S1E13	Santosh Panta & Lochan Rijal	10 March 2018	
S1E14	Jems Pradhan & Anil Gurung	17 March 2018	
S1E15	COBWEB Band	24 March 2018	
S1E16	Binod Chaudhary	31 March 2018	
S1E17	Nir Bikram Shah	07 April 2018	
S1E18	Hari Bansha Acharya & Deepak Bajracharya	17 April 2018	
S1E19	General Rajendra Chhetri	21 April 2018	
S1E20	Neetesh Jung Kunwar & Sisan Baniya	28 April 2018	
S1E21	Dayahang Rai & Ani Choying Drolma	05 May 2018	
S1E22	Rishi Dhamala & Rekha Thapa	12 May 2018	
S1E23	Jitu Nepal & Reecha Sharma	19 May 2018	
S1E24	Miss Nepal - 2018 (Winners)	26 May 2018	
S1E25	Keki Adhikari & Benisha Hamal	02 June 2018	
S1E26	Basanta Chaudhary & Nhyoo Bajracharya	09 June 2018	

Season 2

No	Guest(s)	Telecast Date	Note
S02 E01	Girish Khatiwada & Sandip Chhetri	15 December 2018	
S02 E02	Nirvana, Rahul and Varun Chaudhary	22 December 2018	
S02 E03	Dhurmus and Suntali	29 December 2018	
S02 E04	Anil Keshari Shah & Indira Joshi	05 January 2019	
S02 E05	Shrinkhala Khatiwada & Ram Krishna Dhakal	13 January 2019	
S02 E06	Moktan Family	19 January 2019	
S02 E07	Abhaya Subba & Sukadev Karki	26 January 2019	
S02 E08	Anoop Bikram Shahi & Alok Shree	02 February 2019	
S02 E09	Kutumba	09 February 2019	
S02 E10	Kul Man Ghising & Subin Bhattarai	16 February 2019	
S02 E11	Anmol K.C. & Bhuwan K.C.	23 February 2019	
S02 E12	Komal Oli & Sambhujeet Baskota	02 March 2019	
S02 E13	Pradeep Khadka & Pramod Kharel	09 March 2019	
S02 E14	Madan Krishna Shrestha and Hari Bansha Acharya	16 March 2019	
S02 E15	Karma & Nakim Uddin	23 March 2019	
S02 E16	Manita Devkota & Hemanta Sharma	30 March 2019	
S02 E17	Nabin K Bhattarai & Mahesh Maharjan	06 April 2019	
S02 E18	Kali Prasad Baskota & Namrata Shrestha	16 April 2019	
S02 E19	Adrian Pradhan & Prashant Tamrakar	20 April 2019	
S02 E20	Najir Hussain, Bipin Karki & Kameshwor Chaurasiya	27 April 2019	
S02 E21	Mukti Shakya & Vinay Shrestha	04 May 2019	
S02 E22	Karma Band	11 May 2018	
S02 E23	Sugam Pokhrel & Paul Shah	18 May 2018	
S02 E24	Pushpa Basnet & Gaurav Pahari	25 May 2018	
S02 E25	Hari Khadka & Upendra Man Singh	01 June 2018	
S02 E26	Grand Finale	08 June 2018	
