= Sagarmatha Television (Nepal) =

Nepali television channel

- Sagarmatha TV Logo
- Country: Nepal
- Broadcast area: Nepal and abroad
- Headquarters: Kathmandu, Nepal

Ownership
- Owner: Sagarmatha Television Pvt. Ltd

History
- Launched: July 2007

Links
- Website: www.sagarmatha.tv

Sagarmatha Television is a Nepali television channel established in July 2007. It is a news channel that broadcasts in Nepali language. STV is a leader in live and breaking news telecast and prompt information delivery of current affairs in Nepal. The channel has started an initiate by journalist Shubha Kandel (who runs ABC Television-https://www.abcnepal.tv/). STV uses bureaus in all districts and overseas countries and makes every effort to keep the viewers informing from uniquely different angles. Its headquarters are in Babarmahal, Kathmandu.

It has the slogan "तपाईंको तेश्रो आँखा" (Your Third Eye), this is the Nepal's first news channel. This is the only one channel that broadcasts news in Nepali Language.

== See also ==
- List of Nepali Television Stations
- ABC Television
- History of Television in Nepal (biplav.com)
