= NTV Kohalpur =

Nepali television channel

- Country: Nepal
- Broadcast area: Nepal and abroad
- Headquarters: Kolahpur,11, Banke, Bheri, Nepal

Programming
- Language(s): Nepali (Primary); Tharu (Secondary/Regional); English (International)
- Picture format: 4:3 (576i, SDTV)

Ownership
- Owner: Government of Nepal
- Sister channels: Nepal Television; NTV PLUS; NTV News; NTV Itahari

History
- Launched: 14 April 2017

Links
- Website: ntv.org.np

Availability

Terrestrial
- Analogue: VHF band

NTV Kohalpur is a television channel in Nepal, with a focus on news. It is one of the four sister channels of Nepal Television, the country's state-controlled television broadcaster.

The station began broadcasting on 14 April 2017 (1st Baisakh 2074 BS).

== See also ==
- Nepal Television
- List of Nepali television stations
