= Udaan (album) =

2015 studio album by Shweta Punjali

Udaan (translated: Talking Flight) is a Nepali music album launched by singer Shweta Punjali in April 2015. It contains six songs (see below) all of which are composed by award-winning Nepali music composer Nhyoo Bajracharya and written by noted Nepali and Newari poet Durga Lal Shrestha.

The album is the first mainstream Nepali music album (fully produced in Nepal) to be released on online music stories, including iTunes Store, Google Play Music, Amazon Music, Spotify, Deezer and other such stores.

Three songs from the album were nominated for top music awards in Nepal, including one for the best music and one for the best music video. Shweta Punjali, the singer of the album was award the Best New Artist Award at the national music award for the song 'Achammai Lagyo Malai'.

== Songs ==
- Kasto Bhet (Nominated, Best Newcomer, 2015 Tuborg Image Music Award)
- Achammai Lagyo Malai (Winner, Best New Artist, 2016 Nepali Music Award; Nominated, Best Music, 2016 Nepali Music Award)
- Bato Herirahechhu (Nominated, Best Music Video - Diaspora, 2016 Nepali Music Award)
- Aaja Malai
- Sanghuro Bho Bato Mero
- Haraunchhu Ma
