= Hostel (TV series) =

- होस्टल
- Genre: Reality show
- Based on: Six Teenager
- Starring: Shrijana Acharya; Nitesh Raj Pant; Loonibha Tuladhar; Pallav; Bhuwan K.C. Priyanka Sharma; Abhilasha subba
- Country of origin: Nepal
- Original language: Nepali
- No. of episodes: (list of episodes)

Production
- Production locations: Kathmandu, Nepal
- Camera setup: Multiples Camera
- Running time: 20m

Original release
- Network: Nepal Television

Hostel (Nepali: होस्टल) is a TV series about six teenagers who live in a hostel in Kathmandu to pursue higher studies. It portrays students from different walks of lives who live together and share a strong bond of emotional relationships. The show aired in the summer of 2003 for 18 episodes in Nepal Television but was abruptly taken off-air.

== Plot ==
It was produced by an independent production house called Shree Maruni Film Production and was directed by young director Nitesh Raj Pant who directed another popular show with similar theme titled "Catmandu". Catmandu was an incredibly successful TV series and director Pant tried a similar plot in Hostel.

Hostel began with the introduction to the resident students. A new guy from Biratnagar joins them in the first episode who is scared off by the rest of the friends. Then the show went and explored other aspects of students living away from home and having fun together. The show also depicted the personal life of the owner of the place played by Shrijana Acharya. Director Nitesh Raj Pant also joined the show in the role of a character called Abhay in the final few episodes. Veteran actor Santosh Pant made a cameo in the final episode.

== Cast of Hostel ==
- Shrijana Acharya .. Ma'am
- Nitesh Raj Pant .. Abhay
- Loonibha Tuladhar ..
- Pallav ..
- Bhuvan KC .. Ksitiz
- Priyanka Sharma .. Bijeta
- Abhilasha Subba .. Sonia

Sattu

== Crew of Hostel ==
- Director : Nitesh Raj Pant
- Camera: Kanak Mishra
- Script/Screen Play Writer: "Surendra Rana"and Safar Pokharel

There were rumours about the show returning to the TV in 2006 with a new cast but the plans were shattered when director Nitesh Raj Pant himself moved away to Sydney, Australia.

== See also ==
- The Hostel - Ugandan drama series

== Related links ==
- Nitesh Raj Pant Profile
- Nitesh Raj Pant at DCNepal.com
