= Durga Lal Shrestha =

Nepalese writer (1935–2026)

Janakavi Durga Lal Shrestha
- दुर्गालाल श्रेष्ठ
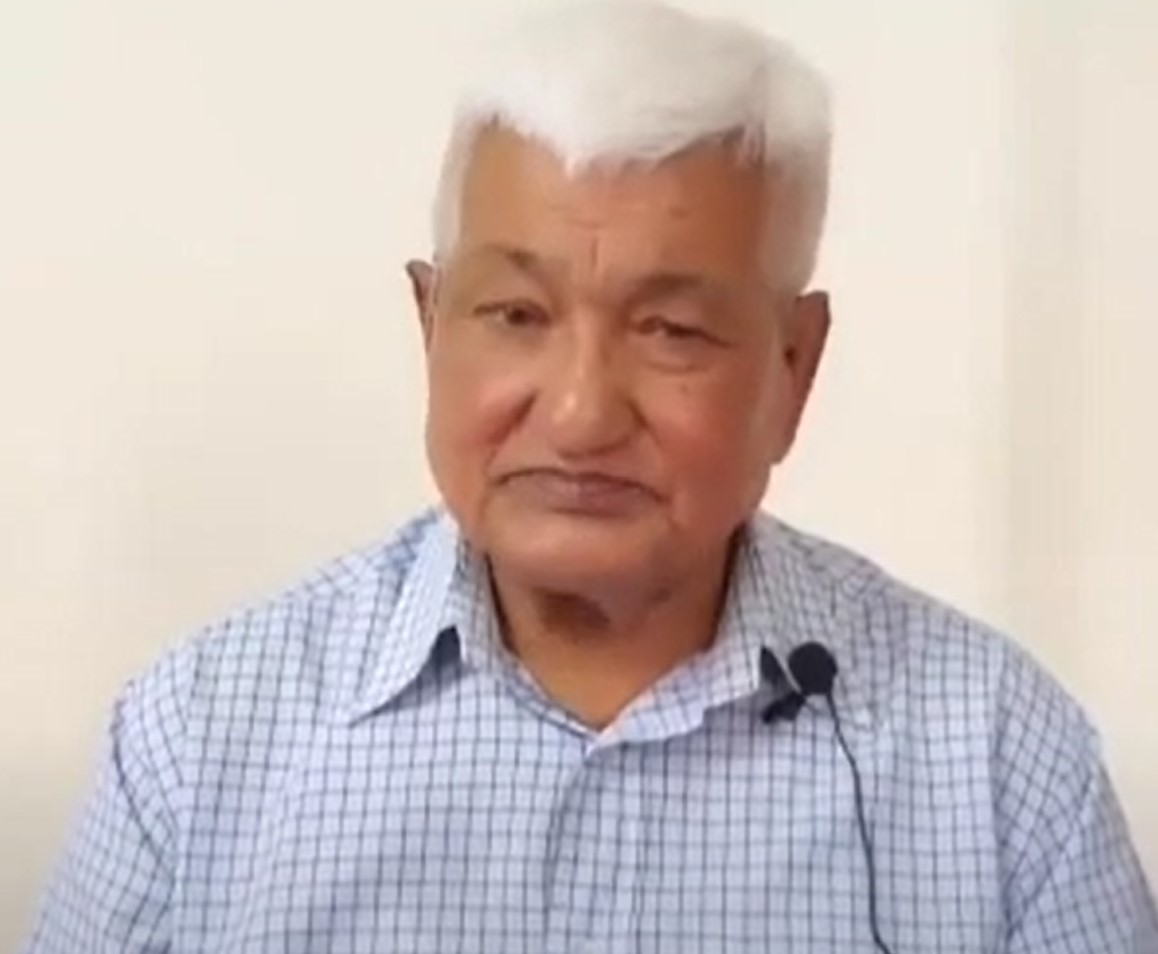
- Shrestha in 2021
- Born: July 1935; Kathmandu, Nepal
- Died: 16 August 2026 (aged 91); Budhanilkantha, Nepal
- Occupations: Writer, poet, lyricist
- Notable work: Phool ko Aankha Maa, Phoolai Sansar
- Spouse: Purna Devi Shrestha
- Awards: Jagadamba Shree Puraskar

Durga Lal Shrestha (July 1935 – 16 August 2026) was a Nepalese poet and lyricist of Nepal Bhasa and Nepali. He was conferred with the title of Janakavi (lit. people's poet) by Nepal Bhasha Parishad in 2003. Shrestha is considered a progressive litterateur. He was awarded the Jagadamba Shree Puraskar in 2010 for "enriching Nepalese literature by writing very melodious songs, poems, poetry and children's literature in his mother tongue (Nepal Bhasa) and Nepali language for the last six decades."

== Life and career ==
Shrestha was born in a lower–middle-class Newar family in July 1935 (1992 BS) in the Nepalese capital city of Kathmandu to mother Asha Moti Shrestha and father Ganesh Lal Shrestha. He received his school-level education from Padmodaya Secondary School.

He started his writing career around 1949. His first poem titled Dui Thopa (lit. Two Drops) was published in 1952 in Suskera magazine.

Shrestha received multiple awards including Narottamdas-Indira Award, Abhiyan Award, Noor-Ganga Award, Rashtriya Balsahitya Award, JAA Best Playwrights Medal (1991), Harihar Shastri–Savitri Devi Literary Award (2006) etc. He was also appointed an Honorary Member of Nepal Academy in 1995.

He married Purna Devi Shrestha in 2013 BS (1956–1957).

Shrestha died on 16 August 2026, at the age of 91.

== Notable works ==
=== Published works ===
His famous published works are:

- Pija (1967)
- Ji Swayambhu Twath (1986)
- Yaka Phalecha (1987)
- Inquilabya Palasa (1991)
- Twists and Turns
- A Pick of Durga Lal Shrestha's poems (2000)
- Chiniyamha Kisicha (1965)
- Taibhaba (1966)
- Chiniya Champa (1967)
- Kulikasa (1967)
- Salachhyonya Bela (1969)
- Machabakhancha (1995)
- Santaya Kusa (2001)
- Macha Bakhancha
- Tapaka
- Jungle Kabita

=== Songs ===
- Soundtrack for Nepal Bhasa movie Rajamati.
- His song "Jhee Masini" ("We Are Not Dead Yet") is considered one of the most powerful songs of the Nepal Bhasa movement.
- One of his popular songs is Phool ko Aankhaa Maa, Phoolai Sansara with music by Nhyu Bajracharya and sung by the vocalist Ani Choying Lama. It is included in the album Moments of Bliss, on which all of the songs are written by Shrestha.
- He also wrote a few songs for the movie Balidan which dramatized the popular uprising against the Panchayat system and the fight to bring multiparty democracy to Nepal.
- He wrote a number of songs for new Nepali singer Shweta Punjali, including her debut album Udaan.
