= Prabal Janasewa Shree =

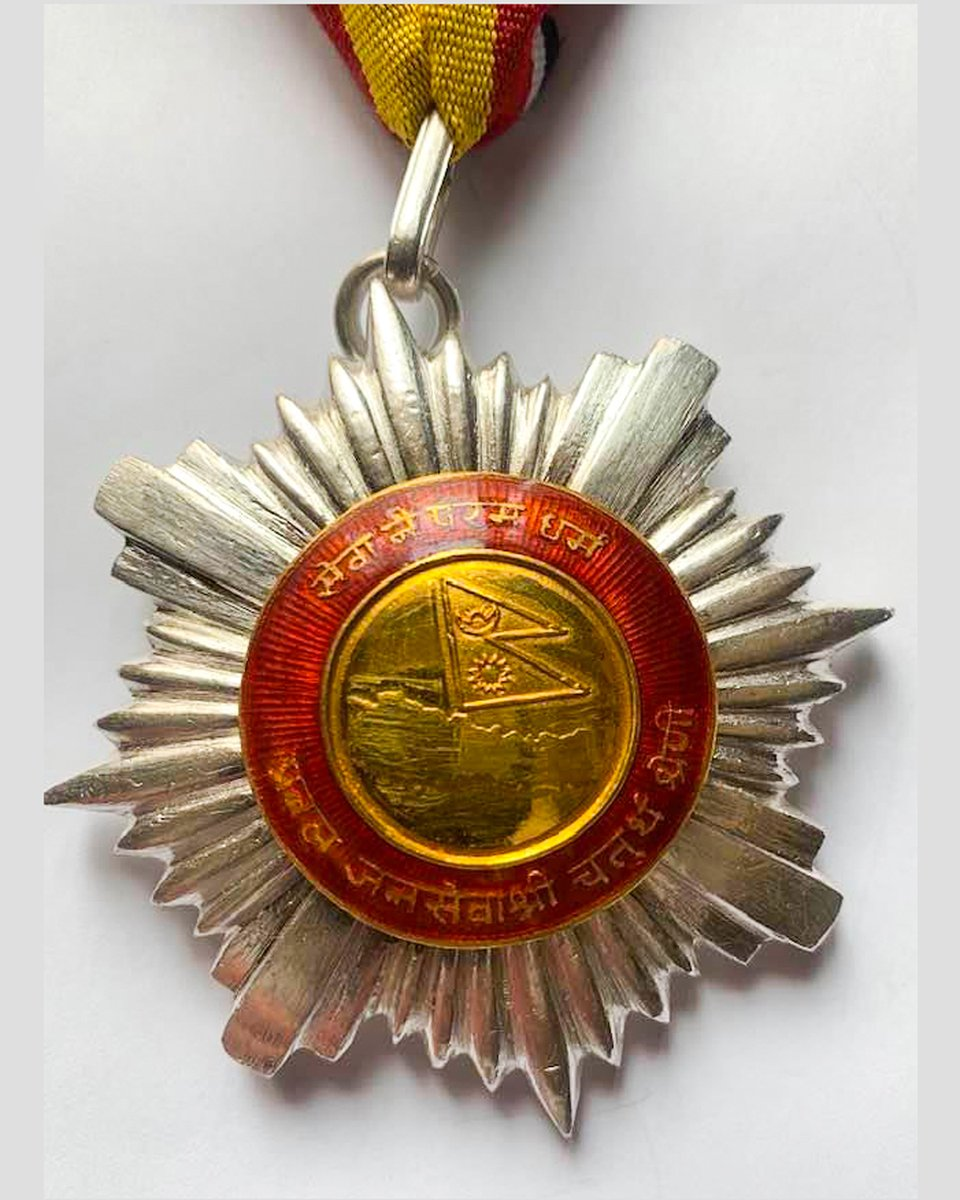
- Native name: प्रवल जनसेवा श्री
- Type: Fourth Class (of the Janasewa Shree order)
- Awarded for: Outstanding service to the nation
- Country: Nepal
- Eligibility: Nepali citizens and foreign nationals
- Status: Active

Precedence
- Next (higher): Kirtimaya Rashtradeep (Third Class)
- Next (lower): Janasewa Shree (Fifth Class)

Prabal Janasewa Shree (Nepali: प्रवल जनसेवा श्री) is one of the highest civilian awards of Nepal. It is presented annually by the President of Nepal on Constitution Day (National Day) to individuals who have made outstanding contributions to the nation in fields including public service, arts, literature, science, social work, and journalism.

== History ==
The Janasewa Shree award design was introduced following the establishment of the Federal Democratic Republic of Nepal, replacing several royal-era decorations. The award honors both Nepali citizens and foreigners who demonstrate exceptional dedication and bring honor to the country through their respective professions or philanthropic activities.

== Eligibility and selection ==
The government of Nepal establishes a high-level decoration committee each year to evaluate potential recipients.

- Nominations: Recommendations are gathered from ministries, provincial governments, security agencies, and public institutions.
- Criteria: Selection is based on impact, longevity, and integrity of the individual's service to Nepali society.
- Announcement: The honorees are officially published by the Ministry of Home Affairs on Constitution Day (Asoj 3).
- Investiture: The citations are conferred by the President at a ceremony held at the presidential residence, Sheetal Niwas, usually the following year.

== Structure ==
The Janasewa Shree series is divided into multiple classes, establishing the Prabal Janasewa Shree (Fourth Class) as a widely recognized category for mid-to-high-level exemplary achievements. The higher classes include:

- Supradipta Mahendrabhiman Shree (First Class)
- Pradipta Janasewa Shree (Second Class)
- Kirtimaya Rashtradeep (Third Class)
- Prabal Janasewa Shree (Fourth Class)
- Janasewa Shree (Fifth Class)

== Notable recipients ==
The award has been conferred upon hundreds of distinguished figures. Notable recipients include:

- Anuradha Koirala – Social activist and founder of Maiti Nepal.
- Dr. Sanduk Ruit – World-renowned ophthalmologist known for restoring sight to thousands.
- Mahabir Pun – Scientist and wireless networking pioneer.
