= Nepal Television =

Public television network of Nepal

Nepal Television नेपाल टेलिभिजन
- Type: Public broadcasting; Broadcast; Satellite television; Internet; OTT
- Country: Nepal
- Availability: Global
- Motto: विकासकाे लागि सञ्चार ("Communication for Development")
- TV stations: 3 (including 19 relays)
- Headquarters: Singha Durbar, Kathmandu, Nepal
- Broadcast area: Worldwide
- Owner: Ministry of Information and Broadcasting, Government of Nepal
- Key people: Dr. Mahendra Bdr. Bista (CEO)
- Launch date: 30 January 1985; 41 years ago (Magh 17, 2041 BS)
- Picture format: 1080i (HDTV) (downscaled to 16:9 576i for the SDTV feed)
- Official website: www.ntv.org.np
- Language: Nepali (Primary); Maithili (Secondary); Nepal Bhasa (Regional); English (International)

Nepal Television (Nepali: नेपाल टेलिभिजन), shortened to NTV is the Nepali national public state-controlled television broadcaster. It's accessible in four languages. It is the oldest and most watched television channel in Nepal. The news broadcast at 8:00 PM is the channel's most popular show, followed by comedy programmes such as Sakkigoni, Mundre Ko Comedy Club and Meri Bassai.

It also has four sister channels, NTV PLUS, NTV News, NTV Kohalpur, NTV Itahari and NTV World, all owned by the Nepali government. The network started broadcasting in HD from 31 January 2019.

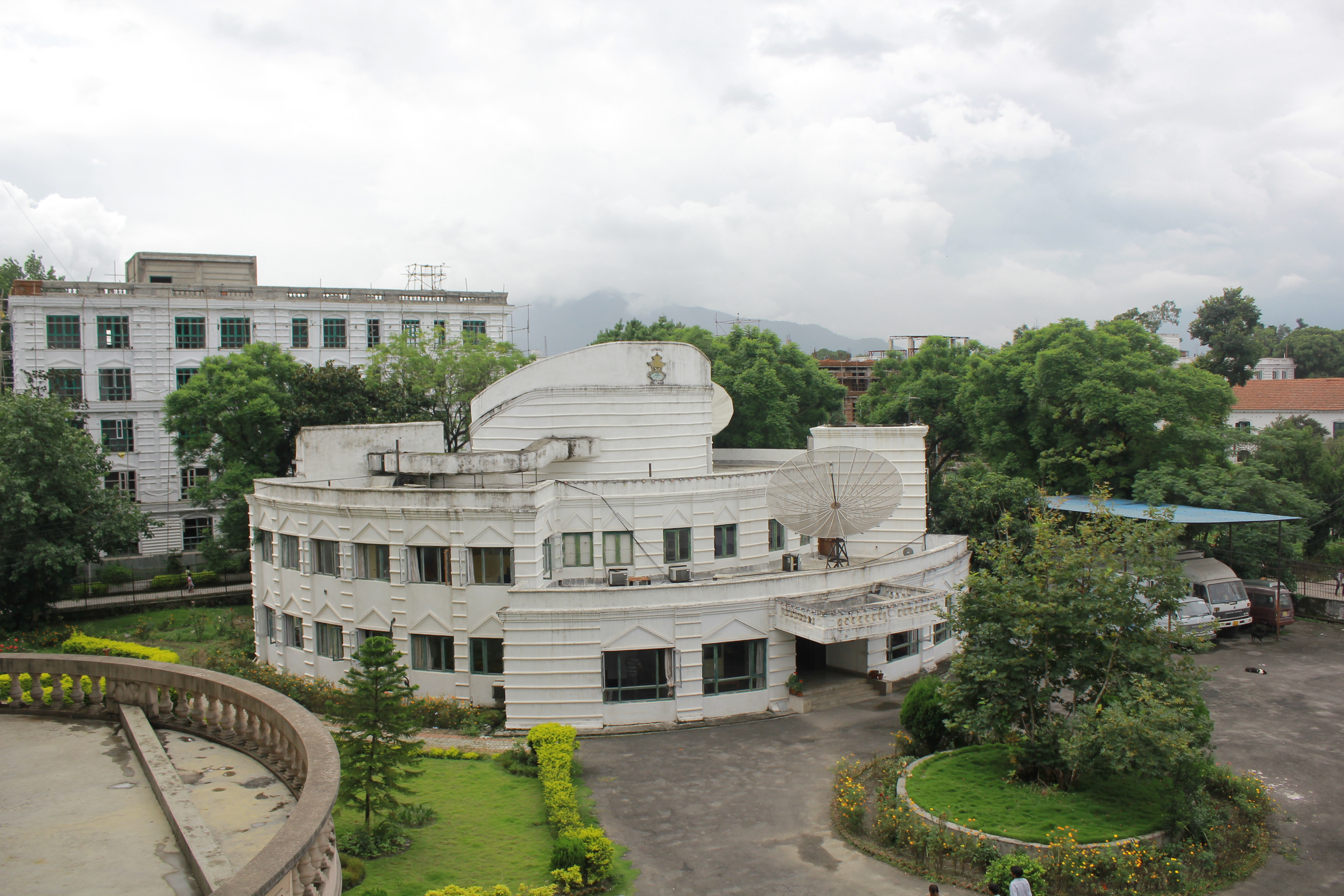
The administrative block of Nepal Television

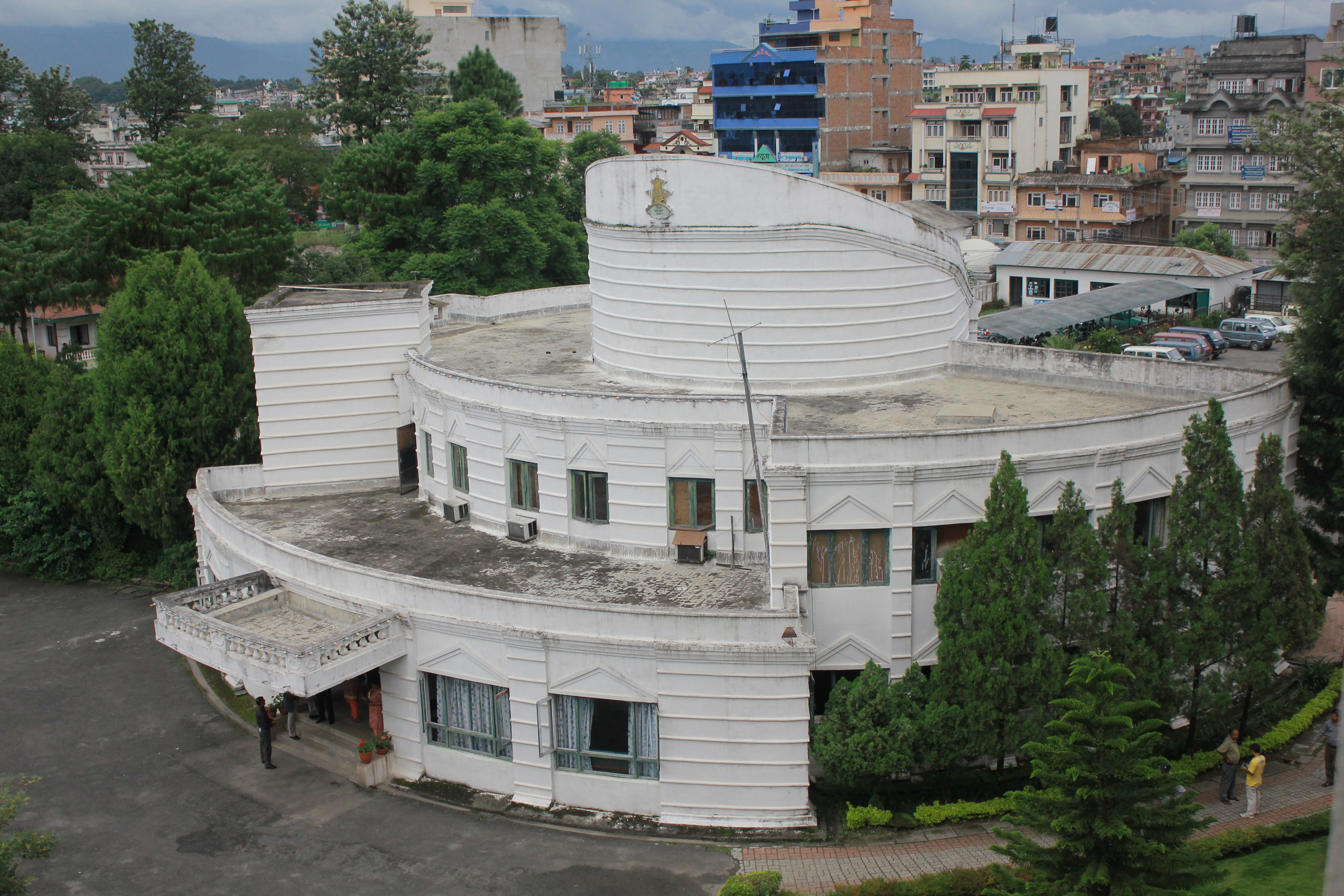
The studio block of Nepal Television

Several attempts are being made by media stakeholders to convert and transform NTV into a truly public broadcasting entity. NTV, being currently owned by the government, has lost its editorial independence and is accused of being a government mouthpiece. Nir Shah was the first chairman.

The iconic logo of Nepal Television was designed by artist Deepak Kumar Joshi.

== History ==
The Nepali government signed an agreement with French government company Sofratev on 14 February 1982 to conduct a preliminary study of the feasibility of a television network in the country for 30 days. Before its creation, Nepal was already receiving spillover signals from India. Its broadcasts started in 30 January 1985 (17 Magh 2041 BS) with limited resources, a 30-minute daily schedule and 400 television sets available in the country. In February 1986, it became a full-fledged corporation under the Communication Act of His Majesty's Government. The channel was initially scheduled to open in December 1986, King Birendra's birthday, but was pushed back by one year (29 December 1985) because the astrologers thought that 1986 was an inauspicious year. The channel received technical support by Erkki and Leena Vihtonen, from Finland, working for the Worldview International Foundation. With no professional infrastructure, NTV's editing was done entirely using tape decks.

Finance Minister Prakash Chandra Lohani had visited Tokyo in January 1986 and wanted Japanese technicians to help enter Nepal into the television age. In February 1986, NTV moved to new premises at Singha Darbar, which were still partly in use as of 2007. Footage of protests in Eastern Europe and China in 1989, as well as a protest against the monarchs of Nepal in March 1990, led to NTV, as well as other media outlets, becoming autonomous bodies in April 1990, when the country lifted a 30-year ban on political parties.

By the late 1990s, NTV was broadcasting from 5:30pm to just after 10pm daily, with a supplementary period in the mornings (6:30am to 8am, with some productions from Image Channel) and an additional period on Saturday afternoons from 12pm. As part of a nine-country NUS survey held in 1996 observing children's programming trends, for the daily four-and-a-half hour period, only one tenth of it was aimed at children. This was due to "severe financial constraints".

== Channel list ==
=== International channels ===
Channel	Programming	Language	Notes
NTV World	General Entertainment and News	English	SD+HD

=== National channels ===
Channel	Programming	Language	SD/HD availability
Nepal Television (NTV)	General Entertainment and News	Nepali and English	SD+HD
NTV Plus	General Entertainment, Sports and Educational program	Nepali and English	SD+HD
NTV News	News	Nepali and English	SD+HD

=== Regional channels ===
==== Province network ====
Channel	Language	Region
NTV Kohalpur	Nepali	Lumbini, Karnali Sudurpaschim
NTV Itahari	Nepali	Koshi, Madhesh Province

== Former shows on NTV ==
- Yestai Hunchha (First television drama of Nepal, directed by Ujwal Ghimire)
- Aayam
- Abhibyakti
- Biswo Ghatna
- Chintan Manan/ Manthan
- Hamro Gaun Ramro Gaun
- Hijo Aaj Ka Kura
- Bhid Sekhi Bhid Samma( Directed by Badri adhikari)
- Hostel
- Khel Khel
- Hatterika
- Tadha ko Basti (Directed by Krishna Malla)
- Mayos Super Challenge
- Nagad Panch Lakh
- Nepali Tara
- Sanibar Vijay Kumar Sanga
- Tito Satya
- Twakka Tukka
- Chakrabyuha
- Raap
- Yuga Dekhi Yuga Samma
- 8 Baje Talk Show Vijay Kumar Pandey
- Chandrakanta (Indian TV drama)
- Indian(Hindi) movie on every Saturday on 2:00PM

== Current shows on NTV ==
=== Comedy ===
- Bhadragol
- Chaleko Chalan
- Cheu Na Tuppo
- Gup Chup
- Hakka Hakki
- Jai Hosh
- Jire Khursani
- Madan Bahadur Hari Bahadur 4
- Maha Jodi
- Meri Bassai
- Sishnu Pani
- Tato Na Saro
- Tato Piro
- Super Hero
- Ke Jamana Aa

=== Reality ===
- Mero Voice Universe

=== Nepali Tele Film ===
- Jiwan Chakra

=== Drama ===
- Aphanta
- Guthi
- Santan
- Sunaulo Sansar
- Yatra Jindagi Ko

=== Game shows ===
- Chham Chhami
- Magical Thumb: A Live Game Show
- Pratibhako Aagan
- Quiz Mania Worldwide by Wai Wai
- Singing Icon Nepal
- The Singing Star

=== Kids ===
- Baal Shanti Abhiyaan
- Moomin
- Nature Calls
- Ferdy the Ant (TV series)
- Opening Children Programme
- Perman
- Motu Patlu
- Doraemon

=== News ===
- Gunte bhai
- Maile timilai kute
- NTV Peace Forum
- Samachar (समाचार)
- Sero Phero

=== Miscellaneous ===
- Miss Nepal
- Artha Ko Artha
- Krishi Karyakram(Agriculture Program)
- Mero Ghar Mero Sansar
- Swasthya Charcha

== Broadcasting hours ==
Nepal Television broadcasts for 24 hours daily.

Date	Transmission times
31 December 1983-now	04:00-22:00 Nepal Time
