= Hakka Hakki =

- Inter title
- हकका हक्की पक्का पक्कि
- Genre: Sitcom; Drama
- Created by: Daman Rupakheti
- Written by: Shiva Sharma
- Screenplay by: Daman Rupakheti; Kabita Sharma
- Story by: Shiva Sharma
- Directed by: Daman Rupakheti
- Starring: Daman Rupakheti; Kabita Sharma
- Voices of: Daman, Rita K.C; Maniraj Kafle
- Theme music composer: Shailendra Shimkhada; Shankar Adhikari
- Opening theme: Gari khaye risauson
- Ending theme: Aba Haka Haki
- Country of origin: Nepal
- Original language: Nepali
- No. of seasons: 1
- No. of episodes: 95

Production
- Producers: Bhimsen Adhikari; Santosh Khadka
- Production locations: Kathmandu, Nepal
- Cinematography: Devanand Silpakar
- Editor: Indra Manandhar
- Camera setup: Sagar khadka
- Running time: 30 Minutes
- Production company: Highlights Nepal Pvt. Ltd

Original release
- Network: Nepal Television
- Release: 2015 – present

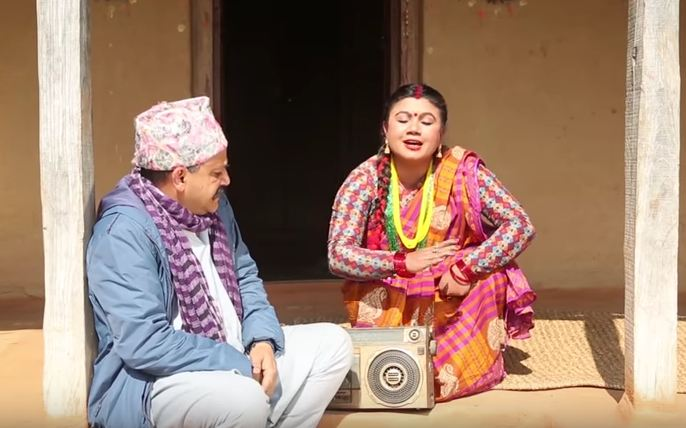
Scene from Hakka Hakki

Hakka Hakki (Nepali: हकका हक्की पक्का पक्कि) is a Nepali sitcom television series which began in 2016. The series is uploaded to Highlights Nepal Pvt. Ltd every week.

== Cast ==
- Daman Rupakheti as Punte
- Kabita Sharma as Punti
- Raju Bhuju
- Ram Thapa
- Umesh Kumar KC
- Prakash Neupane
- Shiva Sharma
- Janak Prasad Bartaula
- Simran Paudel
- Sujit Thapa
- Parwan Rai
- Dharanidhar Neupane
- Maniraj Kafley
- Rajan Chaulagai
- R. K. Manandhar
- Raj Kumar Kunwar
- Santosh Sapkota
- Sushant Giri

== Story ==
People in the village fool each other to gain something.
