= Nepali Tara =

- Country of origin: Nepal
- No. of seasons: 3

Production
- Production locations: Initial auditions: Various; Central Program up to finale Kathmandu
- Running time: approx. 30 min
- Production companies: Miditech Pvt. Ltd. (2005-2009); Wizcraft International Entertainment Pvt. Ltd. (2010)

Original release
- Network: Nepal Television
- Release: 2006 – 2015

Nepali Tara (Nepali: नेपाली तारा, Nepal Star) is a Nepali reality television series that debuted on NTV in 2005. The show is a talent contest to decide the best new singer in Nepal based on viewer voting and participation. It's loosely based on British TV series Pop Idol, but is independently produced and is not a licensed adaptation. The first season was conceived by Brazesh Khanal and executed by Neelbarahi Films Studio 4, as the production house, aired in Nepal television. It became immensely popular with the Nepali Television audience. The packaging of the program was unique

Since its inception, it has completed three seasons. The first season was held in 2005, the second in 2007 and the third in 2014–2015.

The progress of contestants is based on a panel of judges who are renowned personalities in the Nepali music scene as well as audience voting through mobile phone short messages (SMS). Prominent judges feature singer Deepak Lama, Deepak Bajracharya and Bimala Rai, and musicians Aalok Shree' singer Ram Krishna Dhakal, musician Suresh Adhikari and Ram Thapa. The seasons were hosted by Brazesh Khanal who was also the creative head of the first season, Ritu Ramdam, Satya Swaroop Acharya in the second season and Santosh Lama and Dharmendra Sewan in the third season.

The winner of the first season was Deepak Limbu from Tatopani-01, second season winner was Santosh Lama, and Pratap Lama won the third season.

== Seasons ==
=== Season 1 ===
The first season of Nepali Tara was held in 2005. It was conceived and executed by Brazesh Khanal, as the creative head who also hosted the program. It became immensely popular with the Nepali Television audience.

Deepak Limbu won the first title of Nepali Tara, Dharmendra Sewan and Rupak Dotel were the first runner-up and second runner- up. Indira Joshi was also first introduced by Nepali Tara season 1, she is also a judge in Nepal Idol season 1.

=== Season 2 ===
The second season of Nepali Tara started in the third quarter of 2007 and concluded on 21 December 2007 with Santosh Lama being declared winner. The first and second runners-up were Tara Laksam and Yubaraj Tiwari.

The "Top-10" contestants included Shweta Punjali, Rojina Gurung, Sabina Ghalan, Santosh Lama, Tara Laksam, Raj Sagar, Suraj Thapa, RG Kharel, Yubaraj Tiwari and Surya Kiran Lama. Shweta, Rojina and Sabina were the three female candidates and the rest male.

The season was hosted by Ritu Ramdam and singer-brothers Swaroop Raj Acharya and Satya Raj Acharya. Musician Deepak Jangam, folk singer and musician Ram Thapa, and singer Deepak Bajracharya formed the panel of judges.

=== Season 3 ===
The third season of the show started with its auditions in September 2014, after a gap of more than 6 years from the last season. Contestants vied for the prize bag of Nepalese Rupees 250,000 (approximately $2350, as of February 2016) and an opportunity to record songs with music videos, a potential concert trip to Australia, and other in-kind awards.

The "Top-10" contestants include Pratap Lama, Sudesh Subedi, Sushma Bishwokarma, Vishal Atreya, Shristi Sunar (wildcard entry), Ankit Babu Adhikari (wildcard entry), Binod Rai, Jaljala Pariyar, Pratap Das, Swechchha Thakuri, Suresh Lama (second runner up), Debesh Rai (first runner up), Pratap Lama (winner).

The season finale was held on 6 March 2015 at the Tribhuvan Army Officers Club in Kathmandu. The top three contestants included Suresh Lama, Pratap Lama and Debesh Rai, all males.

== See also ==
- Nepal Idol
- The Voice of Nepal
