= Kumar Paudel =

- Born: Sindhupalchok District, Nepal
- Education: University of Cambridge, Pokhara University, Tribhuvan University
- Scientific career
- Fields: Wildlife conservation
- Website: https://www.kumarpaudel.com/

Kumar Paudel (Nepali: कुमार पौडेल) is a conservationist based in Kathmandu, Nepal. He is the founder and director of the Greenhood Nepal. His work focuses on species conservation, wildlife trade and community-based conservation.

== Education ==
He completed MPhil in Conservation Leadership at the University of Cambridge, MSc in environmental management from Pokhara University and undergraduate in environment science at Tribhuvan University.

== Career ==
Paudel started his conservation career by writing letter to the editors in Nepal's major national dailies. Later in 2010, he co-founded National Youth Alliance for Rhino Conservation, that conducted various campaigns reaching out court rooms to parliamentary committee to drag their attention for controlling rampant rhino poaching in Nepal. In 2012, he founded a science-driven non-profit conservation organization called Greenhood Nepal. He worked as a research associate at Lancaster University in 2016-2017. In 2017, he joined ICCS at University of Oxford as a Biodiversity Fellow. His research was supported by Rufford Foundation, Lancaster University, Environmental Investigation Agency, Conservation Leadership Program, British Council and other. He was awarded also awarded National Geographic explorer grant to study pangolins

== Areas of work ==
Paudel's area of work includes interdisciplinary conservation research covering wildlife trade, community-based conservation, political ecology, enforcement and science communication. He has advocated in favor of curbing illegal wildlife trade and scaling up pangolin conservation initiatives in Nepal.

He is particularly known for conducting cutting edge conservation research on the ground and undertaking conservation intervention. Paudel traveled across the Nepal's prison interviewing wildlife prisoners in 2015-2017 as a research to why people commit wildlife crime and how others might be dissuaded from doing so in the future. Later, he published that research on Conservation Science and Practice and produced songs designed to raise awareness about wildlife regulations and the risks of participating in illegal trade. The songs were performed live across the communities around the protected areas in central Nepal.

In 2018, Paudel filed a writ seeking action against the illegal use of wildlife parts in Nepal including by former Prime Minister, who displayed the pelt of a Bengal Tiger during an TV interview in his home. In 2023, he secured the landmark court ruling from Supreme Court of Nepal to investigate rampant private possession and confiscate illegal wildlife parts in the country.
