= Janata Television =

- Broadcast area: Nepal
- Headquarters: New Baneshwor, Kathmandu, Nepal

Programming
- Language(s): Nepali; Bhojpuri; Maithili

Ownership
- Owner: Janata Prasaran Tatha Prakashan limited

History
- Launched: 2017

Links
- Website: janatasamachar.com

Janata Television is a TV channel launched in Nepal in 2017. The headquarters of the channel is situated in Kathmandu, Nepal. Janata Prasaran Tatha Prakashan limited is the owner of the channel.
