= Kantipur Television =

Nepalese television network

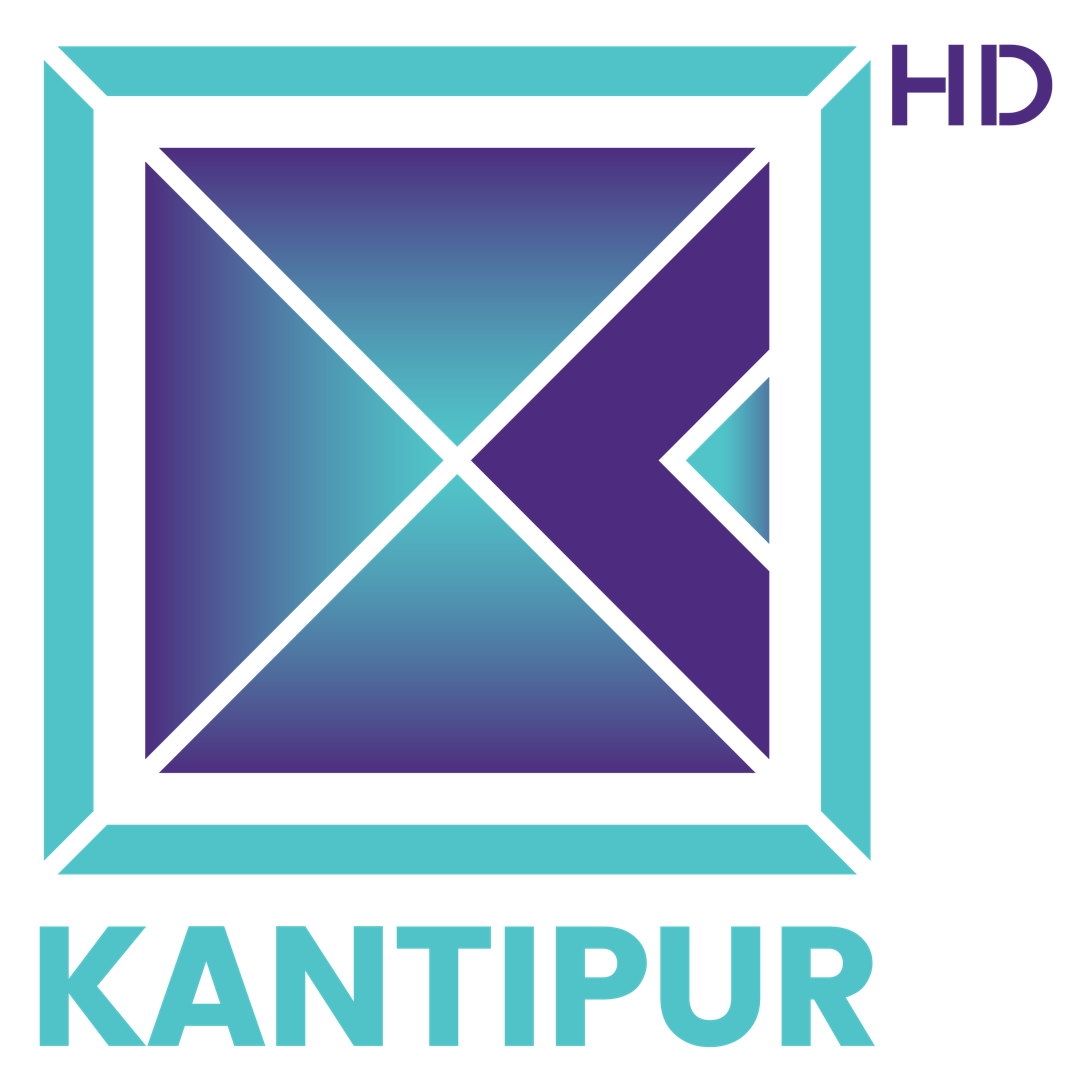
- Country: Nepal
- Broadcast area: Worldwide
- Headquarters: Subidhanagar, Kathmandu

Programming
- Languages: Nepali, English and Maithili
- Picture format: 16:9 (1080i, HDTV)

Ownership
- Owner: Kantipur Television Network Pvt. Ltd
- Sister channels: Kantipur Max HD

History
- Launched: 13 July 2003; 23 years ago

Links
- Website: kantipurtv.com

Availability

Streaming media
- Kantipur Television: kantipurtv.com/live
- YouTube: Available on YouTube

Kantipur Television, popularly known as Kantipur TV HD or KTV, is a private television station based in Kathmandu, Nepal. Kailash Sirohiya is the chairman, Sambhav Sirohiya is the managing director, and Mahesh Swar is the CEO. Launched on 13 July 2003, KTV is licensed for terrestrial and satellite broadcasting. It initially only broadcast in the Kathmandu Valley terrestrially, but later expanded to other parts of Nepal after it began broadcasting on satellite television. Kantipur Television is headquartered in Subidhanagar, Kathmandu. Sabina karki, surendra kattel, Rupa khadka, Binayajyoti sapkota are beknown Anchors.

== History ==
In December 2012, the Intelligence Bureau of India flagged Kantipur Television as a "hate channel" allegedly broadcasting anti-India programming. It was one of the twenty-four "illegal" channels to have been flagged. Kantipur Television launched a sister channel, Kantipur Gold, on 19 February 2015. This was on the occasion of the 22nd anniversary of Kantipur Publications. The channel later commenced formal broadcasts on 18 September 2015. The channel, however, was shut down in December 2016.

== Kantipur MAX ==
The network started broadcasting in HD on 14 December 2017. On 19 March 2021, Kantipur Television launched Kantipur Cineplex HD, a new television station in Nepal focusing on movie broadcasting in association with Highlights Nepal, the largest movie distributor and digital partner in Nepal. Kantipur Cineplex HD has now been renamed as Kantipur Max HD.

== List of programmes ==
Program	Genre
Taal	Entertainment
Call Kantipur	Entertainment
Song Videos	Music
Baliyo Ghar	Reconstruction Based
Double Trouble	Entertainment
Ainaa	Current social problems
Harke Haldar	Entertainment
Ditha Sab	Entertainment
BBC Sajha Sawal	Current affairs
Kantipur Aja	Current affairs
Fireside	Current affairs
Sarokar	News and politics
Scoreboard	Sports
Rajatpat	Entertainment
Kilo Tango Mike	Police procedural drama
Life Is Beautiful	Entertainment
Music Mela	Entertainment
Ghum Gham	Entertainment
Countdown Kantipur	Entertainment
Disha Nirdesh	Current affairs
Rise and Shine	Morning show
Kantipur News	News
Kantipur Samachar	News
SamaKoodh	Current affairs
Paribartan	Current affairs
What The Flop	Comedy
Frame by Frame	Kollywood news and entertainment
Countdown Kantipur	Music
Tiffin Box	Music
2pm film	Film
M&S Nepal	Weekly magazine
Jodhaa akabar birbal tansen mugal	Drama
Twakka Tukka Returns	Comedy
Here's To Life	Entertainment
Good Morning Nepal	Morning show
Comedy Champion	Comedy reality
It's My Show with Suraj Singh Thakuri	Entertainment Table Talk show
Dr. Kantipur	Health
Hidden Treasure Miss Nepal (2020-2022)	Beauty Pageant
Miss Universe Nepal 2023, 2026	Beauty Pageant

== Logos ==
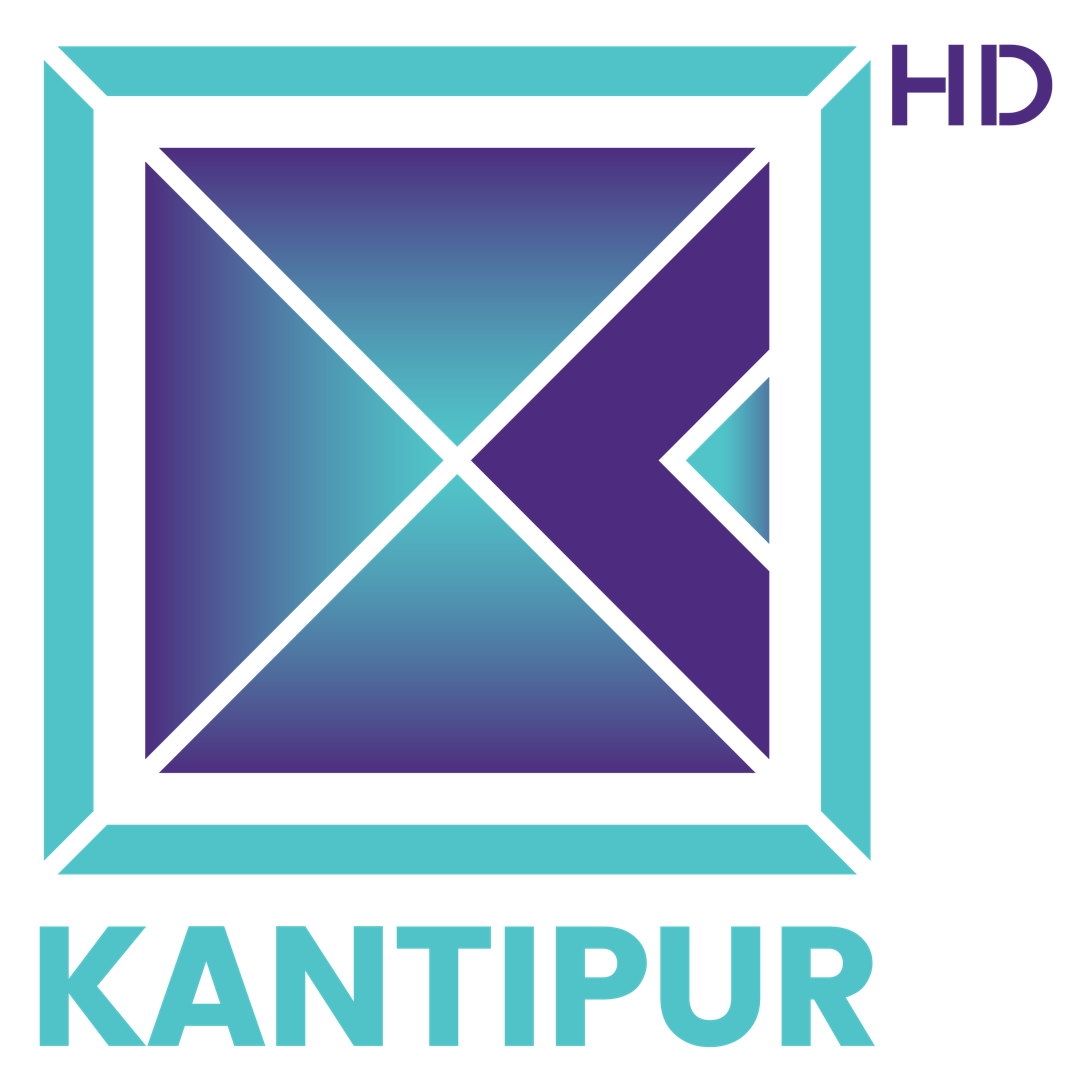
Kantipur TV HD logo (2017 – present)
