= Biswo Ghatna =

- विश्व घटना
- Genre: Sitcom; Drama
- Created by: Durga Nath Sharma
- Country of origin: Nepal
- Original language: Nepali

Production
- Production locations: Kathmandu, Nepal
- Camera setup: Multiple Camera
- Running time: 20 min

Original release
- Network: Nepal Television

Biswo Ghatna (विश्व घटना) means world events. It is the name of a weekly show on Nepal Television hosted by Mr. Durga Nath Sharma and occasionally by other hosts.

== Plot ==
The show contained clips of different interesting events all around the world. The show was probably the first show of its kind on Nepal Television.

== Music ==
This show used the music of the song "White Wedding" by Billy Idol as the theme music.
