= Udaan Campaign =

UDAAN is an initiative by CBSE to enable disadvantaged girl students to transit from school to post-school professional education specially in Science and Mathematics.

As part of this initiative, CBSE will support 1000 disadvantaged girls per year and provide them free online resources in Class XI and Class XII.

Those selected will be provided tablets that have preloaded content, in addition to regular tutorials, assessments and study materials. There will also be regular tracking and monitoring of student development with feedback to parents, besides interactive sessions with teachers and peers. A helpline will facilitate students to elucidate their doubts. The selection will be based on merit as well as economic criterion. Under the proposed programme, Central Board of Secondary Education has appointed teachers and principals as coordinators in each state.
