= Tenzing-Hillary Award =

Annual Nepalese mountaineering award

- Awarded for: Contribution in Mountaineering
- Sponsored by: Government of Nepal
- Reward: रू50,000 (US$370)

The Tenzing-Hillary Award is the prestigious mountaineering honour of the Government of Nepal. The award is named after Tenzing Norgay and Edmund Hillary, the first two individuals to reach the summit of Mt. Everest in 1953. It is awarded annually on the occasion of International Sagarmatha Day (May 29) by the Ministry of Culture, Tourism and Civil Aviation. The receptions can be Nepali and foreign nationals who are honoured for their out-standing achievements and contributions to the mountaineering sector.

== Notable recipients ==
- Kami Rita Sherpa
- Lhakpa Sherpa
- Nima Rinji Sherpa
- Pasang Lhamu Sherpa Akita
- Phunjo Jhangmu Lama
- Tashi Lakpa Sherpa
- Mingma Gyabu Sherpa
- Khimlal Gautam
- Dawa Yangzum Sherpa
- Pradeep Bashyal
- Ankit Babu Adhikari

== See also ==
- Tenzing Norgay National Adventure Award
