= Deepak Limbu =

Dipak Limbu
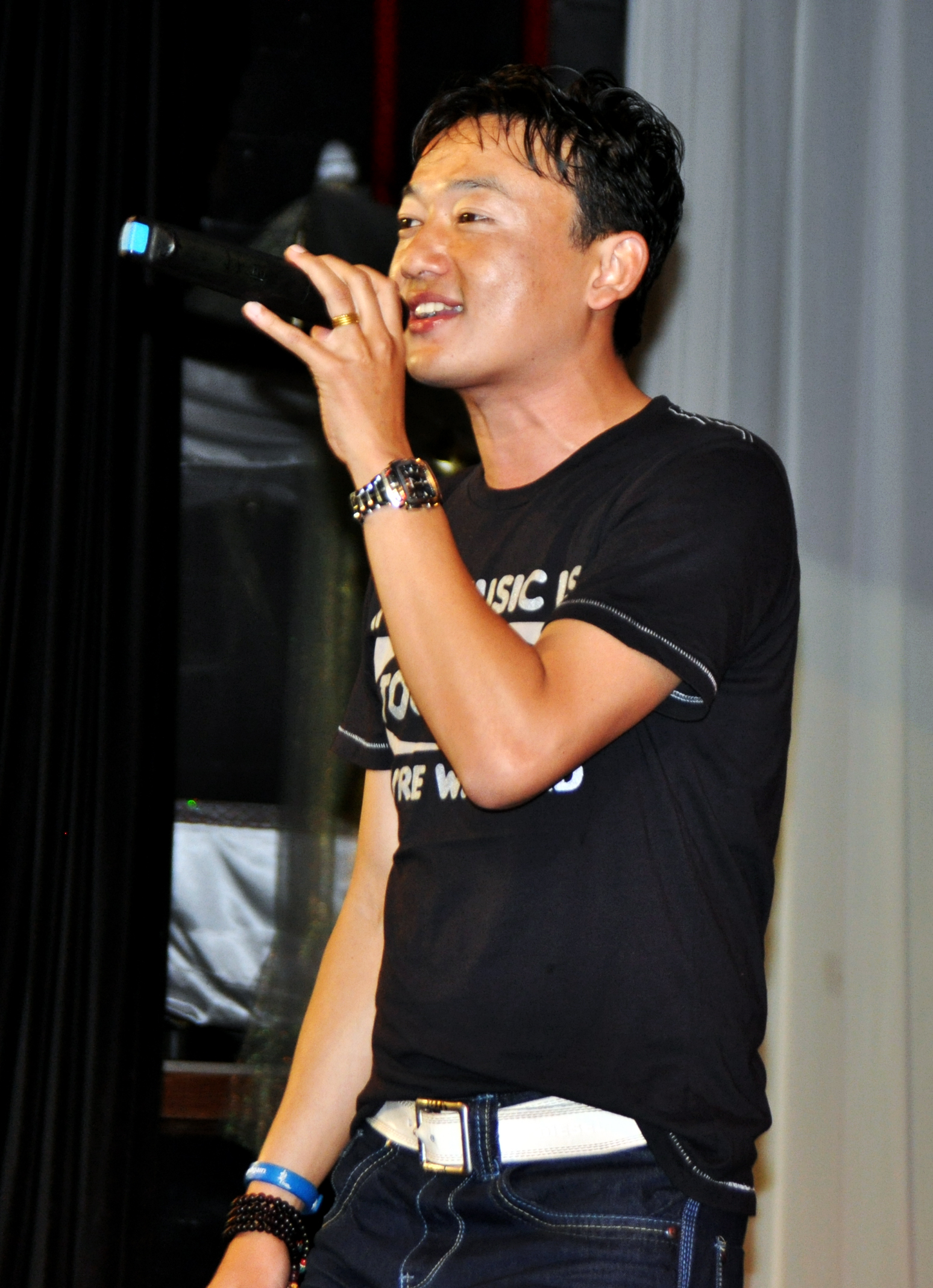
- Deepak Limbu performing in Sydney 2011.

Background information
- Born: May 4, 1983 (age 41)
- Origin: Sunsari District, Nepal
- Genres: Modern Songs
- Occupation: Playback Singer
- Instrument: Vocal
- Years active: 2005 (Nepali Tara)- present

Deepak Limbu (Nepali: दिपक लिम्बु; born 4 May 1983) is a playback singer and winner of the first season of Nepali Tara of Nepal. He has done playback singing for more than one thousand Nepali songs. He performed on a worldwide tour and won several musical awards from 2005-2016. Deepak is also one artist among 365 in a Melancholy Song which set in Guinness World Records in entitled "Most Vocal Solos in a Song Recording", is written, music composed and directed by Environmentalist Nipesh DHAKA.

== Awards ==
- Nepali Tara - 2005
- Chinnalata Puraskar - 2007
- Best Vocal Film Award -2008
- National Film Award 2009- Best playback singer
- D-Cine Award 2010 - Best playback singer
- Narayan Gopal youth music prize - 2016

== Music albums ==
- Sugandha
- Meri Priye
- Nepali Tara
- Timro Saath
- Shreya
