= Senti Virus =

2020 Nepali comedy-drama film by Ram Babu Gurung

- Theatrical release poster
- Nepali: सेन्टी भाइरस
- Directed by: Ram Babu Gurung
- Written by: Dipak Acharya; Kumar Kattel
- Produced by: Dindu Lama Hyolmo
- Starring: Sitaram Kattel; Kunjana Ghimire; Dayahang Rai; Wilson Bikram Rai; Buddhi Tamang; Rajaram Poudel
- Cinematography: Shailendra D Karki
- Production company: Subihani Films
- Release date: 21 February 2020 (Nepal)
- Running time: 135 minutes
- Country: Nepal
- Language: Nepali
- Budget: रु 2.8 Crore Nepalese rupees (NPR)
- Box office: रु 4.2 Crore

Senti Virus is a 2020 comedy-drama film directed by Ram Babu Gurung and written by Kumar Kattel and Dipak Acharya. The film is produced by Dindu Lama Hyolmo under the banner of Subihani Films. The film stars Sitaram Kattel and Kunjana Ghimire in the lead roles, with Dayahang Rai, Wilson Bikram Rai, Buddhi Tamang, and Rajaram Poudel.

The plot concerns an election in the Kavrepalanchok District which causes a marital dispute between Dhrubaram (Sitaram Kattel) and Juneli (Kunjana Ghimire) because their elderly father has declared his candidacy. The film received mixed reviews from critics. Senti Virus was pulled from cinema halls due to the COVID-19 pandemic in Nepal after three weeks of screening. Created on a budget of 28.4 million Nepalese rupees (NPR) (US$234,000 (equivalent to $291,100 in 2025)), it grossed 40.8 million NPR. A 15 percent share of the film's profit was donated to construct the Gautam Buddha International Cricket Stadium.

== Plot ==
A village in Kavrepalanchok District is approaching an election. Surya Bikram (Basanta Bhatta), a rich and powerful man, has declared his candidacy in the election and Dhrubaram (Sitaram Kattel) supports him. Meanwhile, Dhrubaram's wife Juneli's father (Rajaram Poudel) declares his candidacy. Juneli (Kunjana Ghimire) wants her father to win, but Dhrubaram is the president of Bikram's political party and is obliged to support his party candidate. The support of the opposing candidates leads to a marital dispute between the couple.

== Cast ==
- Sitaram Kattel as Dhrubaram
- Kunjana Ghimire as Juneli
- Dayahang Rai as Leader
- Wilson Bikram Rai as a local youth
- Buddhi Tamang as Dhrubaram's neighbor
- Rajaram Poudel as Juneli's father
- Sandip Chhetri as Land mafia
- Basanta Bhatta as Surya Bikram

== Production ==
The original title, Anti Virus, was changed on the advice of an astrologer to Senti Virus. The film was officially announced on 7 August 2019. The cinematography was done by Shailendra D Karki. Principal photography began in July 2019. Senti Virus was filmed at various locations, including Rupakot and Pokhara. Filming concluded in October 2019.

== Soundtrack ==
The film's soundtrack was composed by Shankar Thapa and Sushant Gautam, with lyrics by DP Khanal and Harka Saud. The vocals were performed by Melina Rai, Kali Prasad Baskota, Pramod Kharel, Bidhya Manju Tiwari, and Sushant Gautam. The soundtrack was released on 21 February 2020 for digital download.

Original Motion Picture Soundtrack
No.	Title	Lyrics	Music	Singer(s)	Length
1.	"Fun Funy"	DP Khanal	Shankar Thapa	Melina Rai, Kali Prasad Baskota	3:29
2.	"Aafno Party Jitaide"	Harka Saud	Sushant Gautam	Pramod Kharel, Bidhya Manju Tiwari	4:24
3.	"A Ni Lai"	Harka Saud	Sushant Gautam	Sushant Gautam	3:55
Total length:					11:08

== Release ==
The first-look poster for the film was released on 5 November 2019 featuring Sitaram Kattel and the release date. On 28 January 2020, the theatrical trailer was released. The song "Fun Funy" was released before the release of the trailer.

Before releasing the film, the producers announced that 15 percent of the profit from Senti Virus would be donated to the construction of Gautam Buddha International Cricket Stadium. The project to build the first ICC standard stadium in the country was started by the Dhurmus Suntali Foundation. Screenings of the film were planned in Europe, America, and South Korea after its release in Nepal. Senti Virus was released on 21 February 2020 in Nepal, on the occasion of Maha Shivaratri. The film was released alongside four films, including Aama, The Call of the Wild, Shubh Mangal Zyada Saavdhan, and Bhoot – Part One: The Haunted Ship. The international distribution rights of the film were sold to NepCine for 11.5 million NPR.

Senti Virus was pulled from cinema halls after three weeks of screening due to the COVID-19 pandemic in Nepal. The Rising Nepal described the film as "probably the biggest victim of COVID-19". Sitaram Kattel said that the COVID-19 pandemic had shattered his plans, saying, "I am now in tension; my plans have been ruined [...] When my film failed to survive even three weeks in local theatres, and all doors to release it abroad have been shut down, I have come to Chitwan to cope with the tension".

== Box office ==
The budget of the film was 28.4 million NPR (US$234,000 (equivalent to $291,100 in 2025)). Senti Virus grossed 11.2 million NPR (US$92,500 (equivalent to $115,100 in 2025)) on its opening day. As of June 2020, it had made total earnings of 40.8 million NPR (US$337,000 (equivalent to $419,200 in 2025)).

== Reception ==
Rupak Risal of Moviemandu said that the film left many questions unanswered, writing, "When you come out of the theatre, it feels like a huge chunk of [the] movie is left somewhere in the editing room as the botched up conclusion is so abrupt". Reena Moktan of Kantipur wrote that the climax of the film is very weak. Anil Yadav of Saptahik assumed that the director Ram Babu Gurung made the film only to earn money. The staff of Onlinekhabar praised the acting of the lead actors. Shukrabar asserted that Senti Virus is the weakest film of Ram Babu Gurung's career.
