= Coca-Cola in Nepal =

The Coca-Cola was introduced to the Nepalese market in 1973 by importing from India. In 1979, the local production of Coca-Cola started in Nepal. As of 2020, the production is run by a publicly listed company, Bottlers Nepal Limited (BNL). There are two bottling plants, one in Kathmandu and another in Bharatpur, which is known as Bottlers Nepal (Terai) Limited. Both are owned by BNL. As of June 2020, about 500 people work in the manufacturing plant.

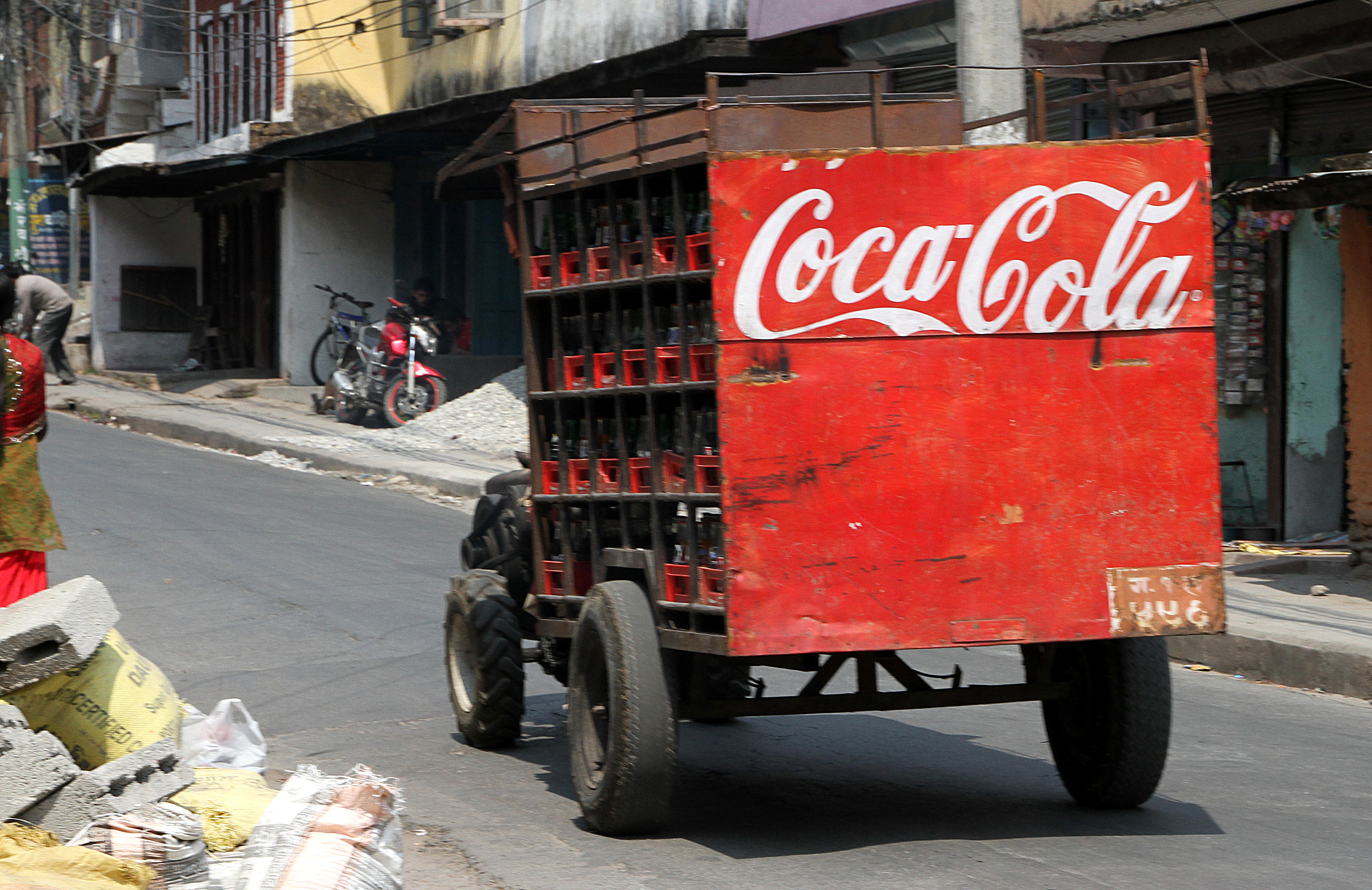
A vehicle carrying bottles of Coca-Cola in Pokhara, Nepal.

== History ==
Nepal was importing about 150,000 bottles of Coca-Cola from Indian manufacturer called the Steel City Beverages of Jamshedpur owned by at Nakul D. Kamani. During late 1960s, the government of India forced 26 Indian Coca-Cola manufactures to be closed, which let Kamani to initiate the opening of the Coca-Cola company in Nepal. Meanwhile, the Bottlers Nepal (P) Ltd was holding the licence procured from the Coca-Cola since 1968, but not manufacturing it locally. In 1979 Steel City Beverages signed a contract with Bottlers Nepal to provide technical and managerial assistance to produce Coca-Cola.

The bottling plant imported main equipment such as filter, mixer etc. from West Germany while other equipment was purchased second hand from bottlers in New Delhi. The total capital investment was Rs. 1,00,00,000 ($88590).

The Bottlers Nepal Private Ltd. was converted to a public company in 2007 and is listed in the Nepal Stock Exchange.

== Price of Coca-Cola in Nepal ==
The first bottle made in Nepal in 1979 cost Rs. 1.40 ($0.01).

== Local varieties ==
- Diet Coke
- Fuchhe Coke (mini bottle of 300 ml)
- Coca-Cola Jumbo (2500 ml)
- Coca-Cola Zero Sugar
- Jigri Coke

== Notable events ==
- In November 2001, the factory in Kathmandu was bombed by six Maoist insurgents who were disguised in the police. There was no casualty.
- In April 2020, Coca-Cola donated Rs. 8,00,00,000 ($708718) to support against COVID-19 pandemic.

== Controversies ==
The Jigri Coca-Cola introduced in 2019 was criticized by the environmentalist for increasing plastic waste in Nepal amid difficulties in waste management and raising protest with meme such as “littering Nepal since 1979”.
