= Takme Buda =

Takme Buda तक्मे बुढा
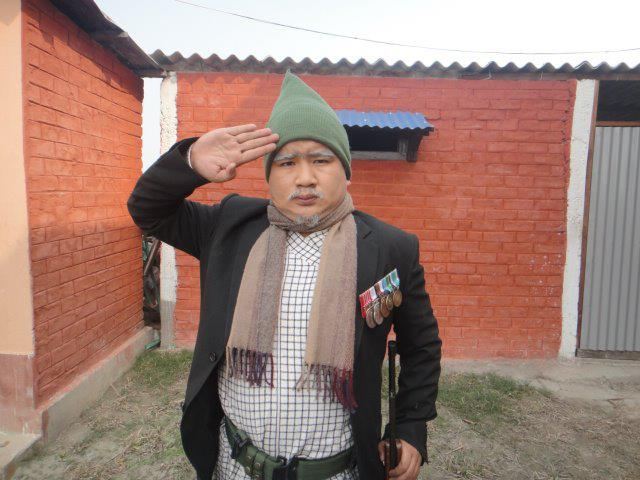
- Wilson Bikram Rai as Takme Buda
- First appearance: Meri Bassai (2012)
- Created by: Kedar Ghimire
- Portrayed by: Wilson Bikram Rai

In-universe information
- Nickname: Bakamfuse
- Gender: Male
- Spouse: Unnamed
- Children: 1 son

Takme Buda (Nepali: तक्मे बुढा; alternative spelling: Takme Budha) is a fictional character on the NTV-produced television series Meri Bassai. He is portrayed by comedian actor Wilson Bikram Rai. He is an old Gurkha war veteran Limbu man who has fought World War I and often tells his story to other people about how he survived in the war. He belongs to Rai and Limbu both community because his father is Rai and Mother was Limbu. he performs as a veteran Limbu soldier imitating the Limbu ascent to entertain spectators in Meri Bassai, a television program. His tone tallies with Limbu mother language speaking people in the television show .
