= Suraj Chapagain =

Nepalese comedian

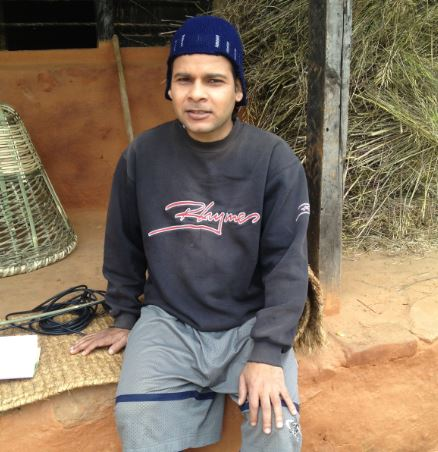
- Suraj Chapagain as Bandre
- Born: 16 January 1984 (age 42); Balubathan, Jhapa, Nepal
- Other names: Bandre
- Occupations: Comedian, actor, script writer, director
- Years active: 2002- present

Signature
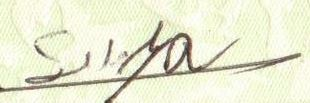

Suraj Chapagain (Nepali: सुरज चापागाईं; born 16 January 1984) is a Nepalese comedy actor, script writer, and director. He is one of the main characters of the Nepalese TV series Meri Bassai, named "Bandre".

== Early life ==
Chapagain was born on 16 January 1984 in Jhapa, Nepal. His father died when he was six years old. After studying at Shree Sharswati Higher Secondary School up to 10th grade, he ran away from home to Kathmandu with his friends and started as a sales man, hoping to become a professional actor and a comedian someday.

== Career ==
Suraj Chapagain, widely recognized by his stage name 'Bandre,' embarked on a remarkable journey from Damak, Jhapa, to the heart of the Nepali entertainment industry. Driven by the dream of a bright future, he moved to Kathmandu, where he initially sustained himself by selling shoes at Ratnapark. Despite the hardships of street vending, his passion for media led him to enroll in acting classes, a decision that became a major turning point in his life.

During his acting training, Chapagain met the renowned comedian Kedar Ghimire (Magne Buda), which eventually opened the doors to the hit sitcom 'Meri Bassai'. His portrayal of the character "Bandre"—the mischievous brother of Muiya—became a household sensation. His signature catchphrase, "vinaju," and his unique comedic timing earned him nationwide fame.

Expanding his horizons beyond acting, he ventured into production by establishing his own production house, J.S. Media. Under this banner, he produced and appeared in various programs, including 'Gadi No. 420' and 'Mero School'. While these projects showcased his entrepreneurial spirit, they did not reach the same level of commercial success as his early acting roles.

In early 2025, he attempted a comeback in the television industry with the series 'Meri Ammai'. However, after the show failed to gain significant traction, Chapagain pivoted his focus toward the business sector. He is currently active in the second-hand automobile trade, managing a recondition house for vehicles.

Apart from his acting career, Chapagain has expanded his professional presence into digital journalism and media management. He is associated with digital news platforms including Bichardhara and Artha Khabar, where he contributes to media content creation and editorial activities.

In his personal life, he is married to Usha Timilsina, and the couple has a son and a daughter.

== Filmography ==
=== Television ===
- Hijo Aja Ka Kura
- Thorai Bhaye Pugisari
- Meri Bassai
- Gaai Ki Trishul
- Bhadragol
- Meri Ammai
