= Wilson Bikram Rai =

Nepalese comedian

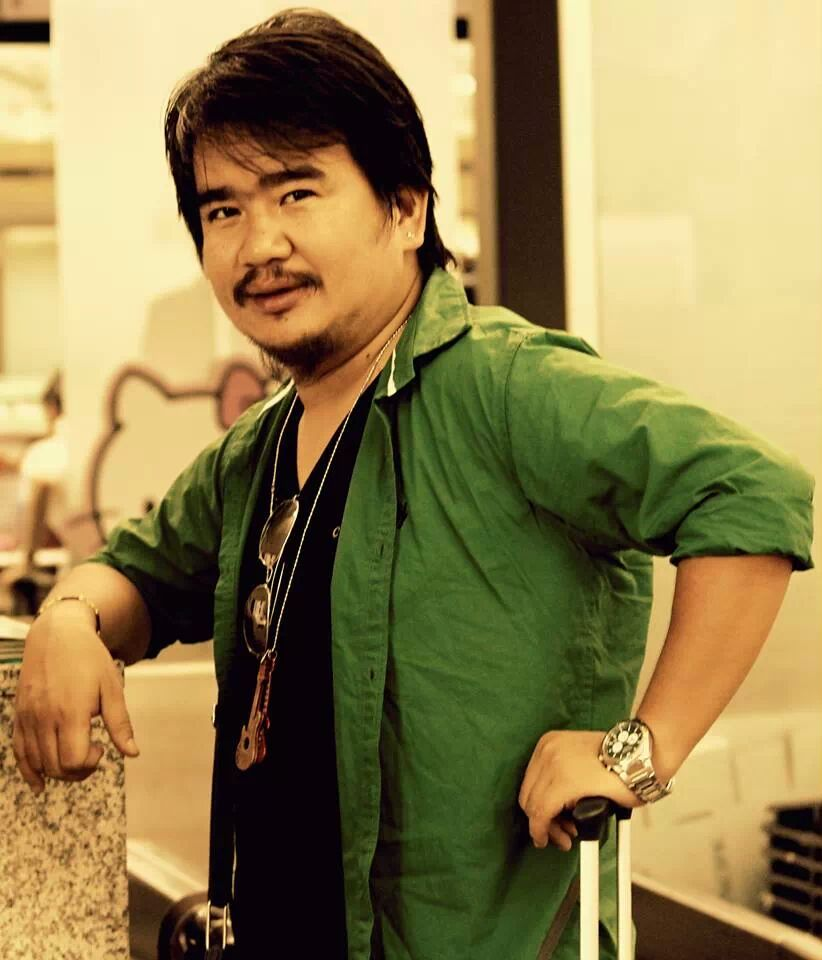
- Rai portraying Takme Buda on NTV sitcom Meri Bassai, March 2012
- Born: Birtamod, Jhapa, Nepal
- Notable work: Takme Buda on NTV sitcom Meri Bassai

Comedy career
- Medium: Stand-up, television, film
- Genres: Observational comedy, Political satire, pop culture

Wilson Bikram Rai (Nepali: विल्सन विक्रम राई) is a Nepalese comedian, actor, singer, dancer and film producer. He played the role as Takme Buda on NTV sitcom Meri Bassai (2012–2015). Now he is featuring in the comedy web series Khas Khus. He often imitates the retired ex-British Gurkha army Kirat accent as 'Takme Buda' to entertain his spectators. He is also the brand ambassador of Italian shoes Black Horse.

== Early life ==
Wilson Bikram Rai was born in Birtamod, Jhapa Nepal where his father and sister still resides. He studied in Little Flowers' English School in Anarmani 4 Jhapa Nepal. His mother Mrs Kamala Kamala Limbu died when he was 9 years old.

== Career ==
=== Playback singing ===
He is active in singing, his songs include:

- Twinkle Twinkle Little Star
- Pani Pani Pani Jindagani
- 19 Fauntin youdda Ladhda Pako Mailey Takma
- I Love You Syantaram
- Chanuwa Mitho
- Jhyana pultung

=== Acting ===
He is known for his role as Takme Buda in Meri Bassai. Before his current role, he hosted a comedy show channel on YouTube, titled The Wilson Bikram Show. He has acted in a number of music videos including:

- Adrian Pradhan's Khairo Khairo Kapal Timro
- Prakash Poudel's Haa Haa Haa
- Parbati Rai's Jhajhalko Aai Rahancha Barai
- Kumar Dumi Rai's Soi Dhole Soi

== Filmography ==
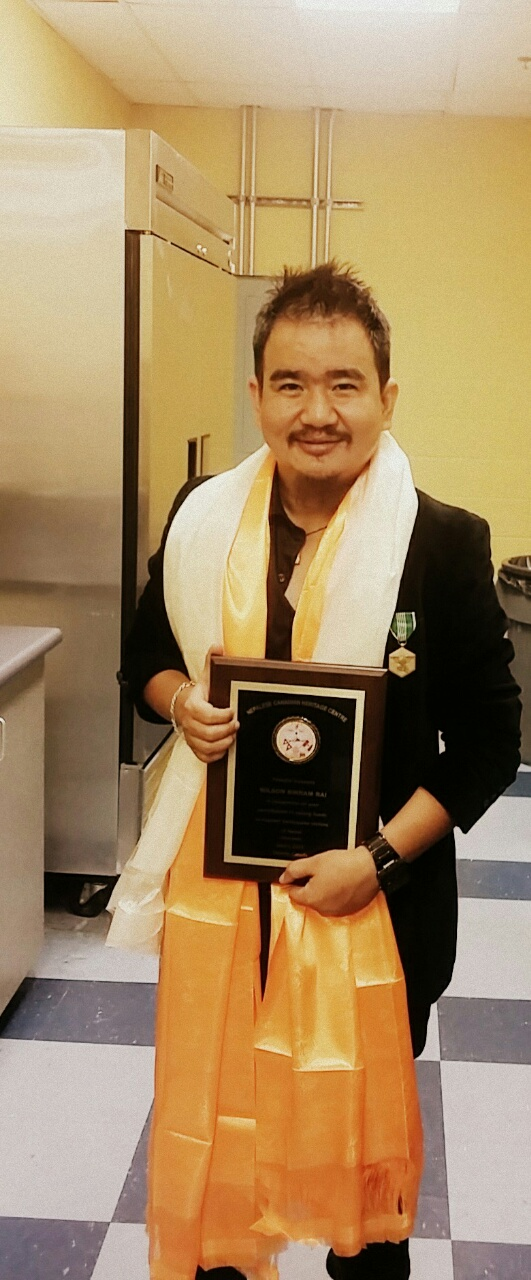
Wilson Bikram Rai

Rai has featured in a number of Nepalese films and Tele-Series.

Year	Film	Role	Notes
1998	Shati		
2008	Samjhana		
2012	Saayad		Best Comedy Artist by Filmy Khabar 2069; Best Supporting Actor NFDC Award; Best Comedy Actor NAFTA
2013	Rhythm		Best Supporting Actor by DCine Awards; National Film Award for Best Actor
2013	Facebook		
2013	Nepathya		
2014	Producer		NAFTA Award for Best Actor in Comedy Role; Kamana Award for Best Actor in Comedy Role; DCine Award for Best Comedian
2014	Humjayega		
2014	My Promise		
2014	One Way		
2015	Adhkatti		
2015	Raato Ghar		
2015	Woda Number 6		
2017	A Mero Hajur 2		
2018	Chhakka Panja 3	English Teacher	
2019	Kabaddi Kabaddi Kabaddi	Dhan Kaji	
2020	Senti Virus		
