= COVID-19 vaccination in Nepal =

Immunisation programme against COVID-19 in Nepal

COVID-19 vaccination programme
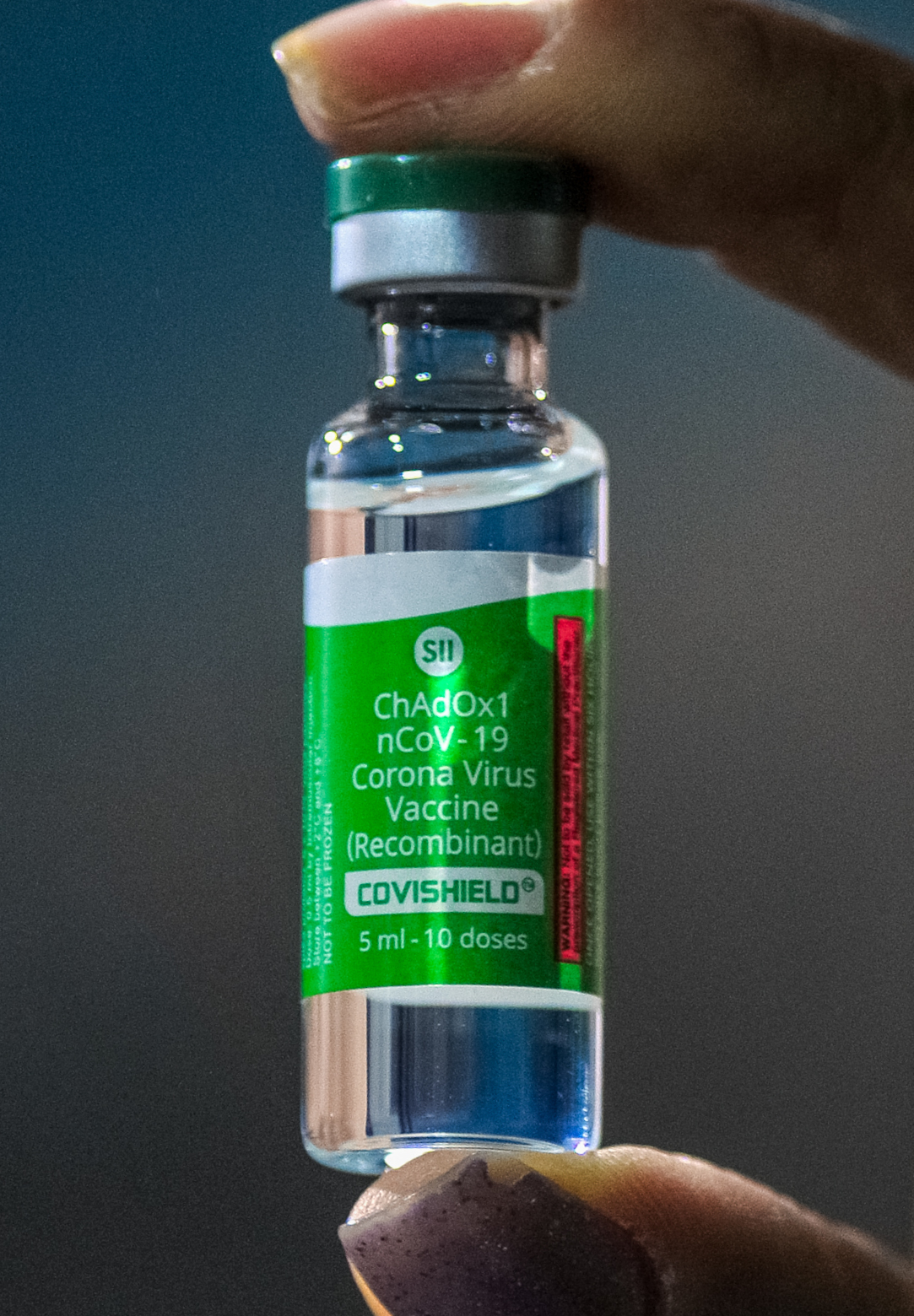
- Oxford–AstraZeneca (Covishied), the most commonly used vaccine in Nepal
- Date: 27 January 2021 – present (5 years, 146 days ago)
- Location: Nepal
- Cause: COVID-19 pandemic in Nepal
- Target: Immunisation of Nepalese against COVID-19
- Organised by: Government of Nepal
- Participants: 1,51,72,527 people with at least one dose administered; 1,12,32,683 people have been fully vaccinated
- Outcome: 51% of the Nepalese population has received at least one dose.; 38% of Nepalese population has received full doses
- Website: www.mohp.gov.np vaccine.mohp.gov.np

Nepal began administration of COVID-19 vaccines on 27 January 2021. 1 million Oxford-AstraZeneca vaccines were provided by India as a grant while Nepal brought 2 million doses from Serum Institute of India (SII) and was one of the first to receive COVID-19 vaccines. The delivery of the first 1 million doses arrived on 21 February. In March, India's decision to ban exports of vaccines created uncertainty over whether Nepal would be able to continue its vaccinations. By April, SII had only provided half of the 2 million doses for which Nepal had paid in full. A spokesperson for the Indian Ministry of External Affairs rejected the notion of an export ban and said "We will export vaccines taking into account the domestic demand." By late July, there was still uncertainty in Nepal over when SII would deliver the vaccines that were purchased, although Prime Minister Narendra Modi said India would "resume the supply of vaccines soon."

Nepal approved China's Sinopharm BIBP vaccine (BBIBP-CorV) for emergency use on 15 February. The first doses arrived in Nepal on 29 March. By July, China, had provided 1.8 million doses of the Sinopharm BIBP vaccine under grant assistance, and committed to providing another 1.6 million doses. Separately, the government purchased 4 million doses in June for which delivery was expected to be complete in a few days and was expected to purchase another 6 million doses in July.

About 1.52 million doses of single dose Janssen vaccine (Johnson & Johnson) arrived on July as aid from the United States. Similarly, Ambassador Berry assured that the U.S. had prioritized additional vaccine assistance to Nepal realizing the need. Nepal on 25 October 2021 received 100,620 doses of Pfizer-BioNtech COVID-19 vaccine provided by the United States through COVAX.

Nepal is set to receive 1.6 million doses of single dose Oxford AstraZeneca as aid from Japan. Nepal has requested additional 3 lakhs vaccine dosage from Bhutan which is under consideration.

== Different stages ==
The campaign was launched with the 1 million doses initial doses of the Oxford-Astrazeneca vaccine. At that time, the virus had claimed 2,017 lives and infected 270,092 across the country. Around 430,000 frontline workers–health workers, supporting staffers at health facilities, female community health volunteers, security personnel, sanitation workers, elderly people living in care homes, and prisoners–were listed as priority groups for vaccination. After the first round of the first phase was completed, the government said journalists and diplomatic staff could take the jabs. When the government announced that the first phase was completed on 5 March, as many as 438,000 had received their first dose.

The day the second phase of vaccination was started 348,000 doses of Covishield arrived in Nepal under the World Health Organization-backed COVAX facility. The government said all the citizens above 65 years of age would be inoculated. The public response was quite encouraging. In the second phase, around 1.3 million people were inoculated across the country.

Nepal became the first country in the Asia Pacific to provide vaccines to the refugees. It was started in March 2021.

== Vaccines in order ==
Currently, the vaccines approved by government of Nepal for emergency use are:

Vaccine	Country of manufacture	Approval	Deployment	Vaccination status	
Vaccine	Country of manufacture	Approval	Deployment	First dose	Fully vaccinated
Oxford–AstraZeneca	India (Covishield); Japan; Sweden	Yes	Yes	18,68,425	7,24,992
Janssen	USA	Yes	Yes		12,62,918
Sinopharm BIBP	China	Yes	Yes	25,74,537	7,38,324
Pfizer–BioNTech	USA	Yes	Yes		
Moderna COVID-19 vaccine	USA	Yes	Yes		
Covaxin	India	Yes	No		
Sputnik V	Russia	Yes	No		
CoronaVac	China	Yes	No		
