= Kunjana Ghimire =

Nepalese comedian and actress

- कुञ्जना घिमिरे
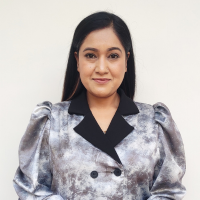
- Born: 29 June 1984 (age 42); Lalitpur, Nepal
- Other name: Suntali
- Occupations: Actor; social worker
- Spouse: Sitaram Kattel (m. 2009)
- Children: Subihaani Kattel (2014)

Kunjana Ghimire (Nepali: कुञ्जना घिमिरे; born 29 June 1984), popularly known as Suntali (Nepali: सुन्तली; a character of Meri Bassai played by her), is a Nepalese philanthropist, comedian, actress and a social worker. She is one of the main characters of the Nepali TV series Meri Bassai. She is considered one of Nepal's most talented actresses because she had played various roles in her own sitcom Meri Bassai. She is highly devoted towards in social work in Nepal.

== Early life ==
She was born in the Lalitpur District of Nepal where her early life and schooling were completed. She used to help her father in his field during her schooling. She used to perform dancing during her school life. Her dances were well appreciated by many people. So, she ran away from this field hoping to be a good dancer, actor, and comedian. Her first successful career as an actor was Meri Bassai. There, she met Sitaram Kattel and got love marriage with him in 2009.

== Career ==
She started to play the role of Suntali, love interest, and later the wife of Dhurmus in the Nepali television program Meri Bassai from 2006. Her acting career got popularly highlighted as her role, acting and the television program became highly acclaimed among the Nepalese citizens.

== Social works ==
=== Dhurmus Suntali Foundation ===
Kunjana Ghimire, along with Sitaram Kattel is a founding member of Dhurmus Suntali Foundation. The foundation recently completed Sindhupalchowk Giranchour Integrated Model Colony Construction Project (Nepali: सिन्धुपाल्चोक गिरान्चौर एकीकृत नमुना बस्ति निर्माण परियोजना). The formal handing ceremony was held on 28 October 2016 in the presence of President Bidhya Devi Bhandari, parents of Sitaram and Kunjana, Madan Krishna Shrestha and Hari Bansha Acharya. The construction project has built a colony of 67 houses with dedicated areas for children parks, public taps, public toilets, parking areas and health post. The colony is dedicated to the victims of the April 2015 Nepal earthquake. now also kunjana ghimire somtime making home made short video (facebook reels)

source: https://www.facebook.com/kunjanaghimire facebook page.

=== Cleanliness programs ===
They are providing information related to cleanliness all over Nepal. They have run a campaign for cleaning the Bagmati river of Kathmandu, one of the holy rivers of Nepal that flow beside the Pashupatinath Temple. Appreciating and following the path of DhurmusSuntali, many different groups and social clubs have been established in Nepal to carry on the various cleanliness and social awareness programs in various places. Suntali (Kunjana Ghimire) and Dhurmus (Sitaram Kattel) are cleanliness ambassador of the Nepal Government.

== Filmography ==
=== Film ===
Year	Film	Role	Director	Reference
2008	Daud	Actor		
2015	Woda Number 6	Producer	Dinesh Raut	
2020	Senti Virus	Actor	Ram babu Gurung	
2021	Ma Ta Marchhu Ki Kya Ho	Actor / Director	Kunjana Ghimire / Sitaram Kattel	

=== Television ===
- Meri Bassai (Not: Kunjana Ghimire, who played the role of Suntali for a long time in the hit TV show Meri Bassai, has now left the program in 2025.)

== Awards ==
SN	Award Title	Film Name / Project	Year	Result / Reference
1	Kantipur Icon Award (Socio-Political Category)	Dhurmus-Suntali Foundation	2018	Won
2	Madan Bhandari National Award	Humanitarian & Social Work	2016	Won
3	Best Comedic Actor	Meri Bassai	—	Won
