= Dhurmus Suntali Foundation =

Nepalese charity

- Type: non-profit
- Purpose: 2017
- Location: Nepal
- Region served: Nepal
- Key people: Sitaram Kattel; Kunjana Ghimire
- Revenue: NPR 5 Billion
- Website: dhurmussuntali.com

Dhurmus Suntali Foundation is a Nepalese charity founded primarily for victims of 2015 Nepali earthquakes. Since then, the foundation has expanded its projects like Gautam Buddha International Cricket Stadium. The charity was founded by well-known Nepalese comedians Sitaram Kattel and Kunjana Ghimire. Famous persons like Rekha Thapa and those from different countries have contributed to this charity.

== Projects by Dhurmus Suntali Foundation ==
Details of Major Projects undertaken by Dhurmus Suntali Foundation are as follows:
Project Name	Schedule (AD)	Status
Flood Victim Relief 2074	August 2017 - September 2017	Completed
Unified Santapur Model Village	14 October 2017 - 6 February 2018	Completed
Unified Musahar Model Village	9 January 2018 - 14 April 2018	Completed
Unified Gaurachaur Model Village	24 April 2016 - 28 October 2016	Completed
Unified Pahari Model Village	31 May 2015 - 12 August 2015	Completed
Gautam Buddha International Cricket Stadium	2018 Onwards	Ongoing
Model (Namuna) Nepal	purposed	purposed

== Flood Victim Relief 2074 ==
Dhurmus Suntali Foundation (DSF) conducted a brief flood victim relief campaign in 2074 BS. The founders themselves participated on the campaign and marked the beginning of the starting of the Dhurmus Suntali Foundation.

== Unified Santapur Model Village ==
S.N.	Field	Detail
1	Name of Project	Integrated Model Santapur Village
2	Starting date of project	14 October 2017
3	Project completion date	6 February 2018
4	Total period	114 days
5	Number of household	47
6	Number of Storeys	2
7	Area of Household	2.75 Dhur
8	Area of house	602 sq. ft
9	Height of house	19 ft
10	Number of rooms	5
11	Toilet	each in house
12	Tap	one
13	Area of rooms of house	9*10
14	Nature of House	Earthquake resistant, flood/landslide resistant, disable friendly, Child Friendly
15	Beneficial family number	47
16	type of beneficiary	flood victim, underprivileged community
17	Total population	284
18	ethnic group	Majhi, Dusadh, hajam, Musahar
19	Amount per house	13 lakh one thousand five hundred 51 and 86 paisa
20	Total investment	6 crore 11 lakhs 72 thousand 9 hundred 37 and 42 paisa
21	Coordination and support	Nepalese residing in Nationally and internationally, NRNA organizations
22	Constructed infrastructure	47 residential house, one community hall, a pre school, a view tower, beautiful garden, temple, children park, helping statue, club house, public toilets, public taps
23	Total area covered	12 Kathha
24	Total collected Amount	5 crore 95 lakh
25	Remained amount	0.00

== Unified Musahar Model Village ==
S.N.	Field	Detail
1	Name of Project	Unified Musahar Model Village
2	Starting date of project	2018 Jan 9
3	Project completion date	2018 Apr 14
4	Total period	95 days
5	Number of household	54
6	Number of Storeys	2
7	Area of Household	3.5 dhur
8	Area of house	872 sq.ft (ground floor 22*22, first floor 22*18)
9	Height of house	19 ft
10	Number of rooms	4
11	Toilet	one inside home
12	Tap	One in each household
13	Area of rooms of house	9*10
14	Nature of House	Earthquake resistant, flood/landslide resistant, disable friendly, Child Friendly
15	Beneficial family number	53
16	type of beneficiary	most disadvantaged and underprivileged community
17	Total population	375
18	ethnic group	Majhi, Dusadh, Hajam, Musahar
19	Amount per house	9 lakh 51 thousand six hundred 38 and 76 paisa ( with all infrastructure)
20	Total investment	Five Crore Four Lakhs Thirty-Six Thousand Eight Hundred Six
21	Coordination and support	District Administration Office-Mahottari, Municipality of Bardibas, Land Revenue Office-Bardibas, Drinking water and sanitation Division-Mahottari; Physical Support-Sasastra Police, Quick Volunteer, Volunteer Ministry Nepal and Different Voluntary organizations
22	Nature of project	A permanent resident for Musahar untouchable, under-privileged, uneducated, unemployed with extreme poverty line
23	Supporting Organization and Personals	All Nepali residing at nationally and internationally
24	Constructed Infrastructure	53 residential houses, a community hall, a temple, a children's park, one parking area, waiting place, Chautara, four public toilets, five public taps, four-meter-wide road along with canal and a view tower
25	Total collected financial support	five crore 63 Lakh 39 thousand one hundred 27 and 53 paisa
26	Amount saved	two crore 59 lakh two thousand two hundred 67 and 53 paisa

== Unified Gaurachaur Model Village ==
S.N.	Field	Detail
1	Name of Project	Unified Granchaur Model Village
2	Project Location	Sindhupalchowk, Melamchi Municipality -8
3	Starting date of project	2016 April 24
4	Project completion date	2016 October 28
5	Total period	seven months
6	Number of household	66
7	Number of Storeys	2
8	Area of Household	3.5 Aana
9	Toilet	one inside home
10	Tap	One in each household
11	Area of rooms of house	10*10
12	Nature of House	Earthquake resistant, Child Friendly, disable friendly
13	Beneficial family number	66
14	type of beneficiary	Earthquake survival, indigenous tamang community
15	Total population	384
16	Project Occupies	35 Ropanies
17	Amount per house	Seven lakhs 78 thousand one hundred and 34 paisa ( Investment for other infrastructure is included in investment per household)
18	Total investment	NPR 5, 135, 8187 (Five Crore Thirteen Lakhs Fifty-Eight Thousand One Hundred, Eighty-Seven Rupees)
19	Nature of project	permanent residency for earthquake survivals supporting organization and personals: All Nepali residing at nationally and internationally
20	Constructed Infrastructure	66 houses, three children parks, four parks, three vehicle parkings, nine Child Friendly public taps, four public toilets, one community hall, one view tower, one chautara, a playground
21	Total collected financial support	6,181,2259.86 ( six crore 18 lakhs twelve thousand two hundred fifty nine and eighty six paisa).
22	Amount saved	One crore four lakh fifty four thousand seventy three and eighty six paisa.

== Unified Pahari Model Village ==
S.N.	Field	Detail
1	Name of Project	Unified Pahari Model Village
2	Project Location	Pahari gau, Kavrepalanchok, Panchkhal
3	Starting date of project	31 May 2015
4	Project completion date	12 August 2015
5	Total period	two months 10 days
6	Number of household	20
7	Number of Storeys	1
8	Area of Household	372 sq.ft
9	Height of House	11 ft.
10	Number of Rooms`	3
11	Toilet	one inside home
12	Tap	One in each household
13	Area of rooms of house	11*10
14	Nature of House	temporary houses with cement board
15	Beneficial family number	20
16	type of beneficiary	Earthquake affected
17	Total population	90
18	Ethnicity	Pahari and thakuri
19	Project Occupies	35 Ropanies
20	Amount per house	three lakh 36 thousand
21	Total investment	67 Lakh and 20 thousand
22	Coordination and Assistance	Nepal Army, Nepal Police
23	Helping org. and personnel	All Nepali residing at nationally and internationally
24	Nature of project	permanent residency for earthquake survivals supporting organization and personals: All Nepali residing at nationally and internationally
25	Nature of Infrastructures	three rooms house with inhouse toilet, childfriendly, disable friendly, ecofriendly, earthquake resistant and flood/ landslide resistant
26	Area	5 Ropanies
27	Constructed Infrastructure	20 residential houses, toilets, taps, gardens, five Bio Gas Plant, One light tower
28	Total collected financial support	67 Lakhs and 20 thousand

== Model (Namuna) Nepal ==
Namuna Nepal project aims to reconstruct the whole country by rebuilding structures that have been destroyed by Nepalese earthquake. The foundation has decided to make a park about the national symbols to attract tourists. The settlement will have communities of different castes, religions and ethnic groups from the hills, mountains and terai. Replicas in miniature of famous tourist destinations like the mountains, Muktinath Temple, Swayambhunath Stupa, Bauddhanath Stupa, Pashupati Temple, Mayadevi Temple, Janaki Temple, and Dharahara, among others, will be built on the premises of the settlement.

Kattel said that the foundation already has Rs 21.3 million in its reserve fund from previous projects that can be invested in the new project.
