= Sagarmatha Sambaad =

Global dialogue forum

- सगरमाथा संवाद
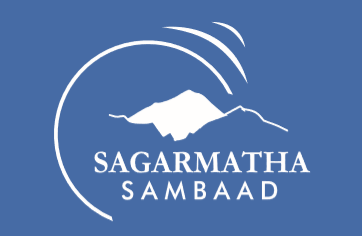
- Formation: 2019
- Purpose: To promote collective well-being through dialogue
- Website: http://www.sagarmathasambaad.org

Sagarmatha Sambaad (Nepali: ne:सगरमाथा संवाद) is a multi-stakeholder, permanent global dialogue forum initiated by the Government of Nepal. It is scheduled to be held biennially in Nepal.

The Sambaad (dialogue) is named after the world's tallest mountain Sagarmatha (Mount Everest) which is also a symbol of friendship, resilience and hope and is meant to promote the notions of common good and collective well-being of humanity. Sagarmatha, being the highest natural landmark on the earth, is also the tallest witness of the unfolding global events.

The first episode of the Sambaad which was originally scheduled from 2 to 4 April 2020 is now rescheduled for 16 to 18 May 2025 in Kathmandu, Nepal. The theme of the first Sambaad is "Climate Change, Mountains and the Future of Humanity." The Sambaad was postponed due to COVID pandemic.

== Sambaad 2025 ==
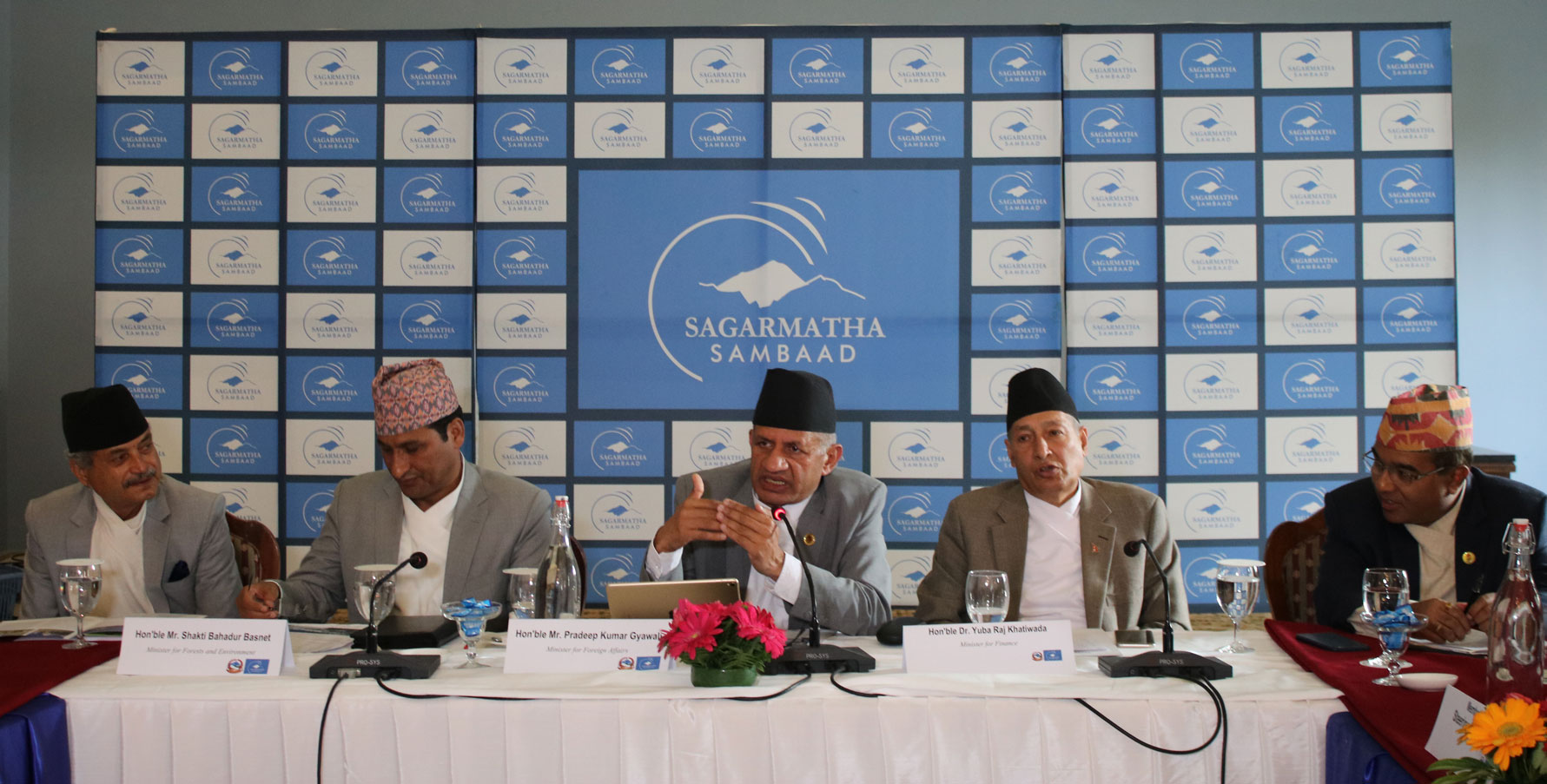
Briefing the diplomatic community by Hon'ble Mr. Pradeep Kumar Gyawali, Minister for Foreign Affairs

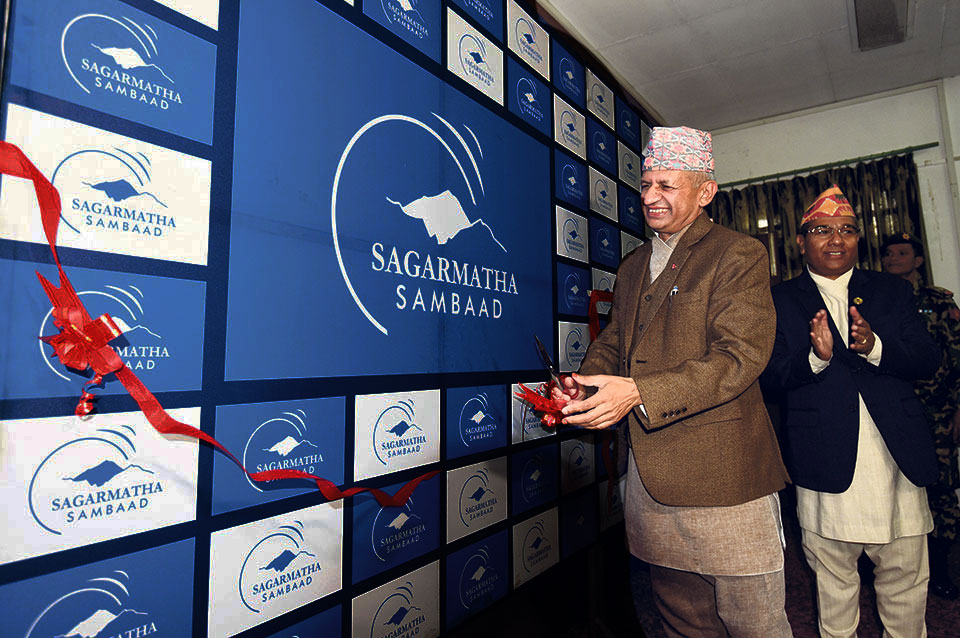
Inauguration of Sagarmatha Sambaad Secretariat by Hon'ble Mr. Pradeep Kumar Gyawali, Minister for Foreign Affairs

The first-ever Sambaad will be held in Kathmandu from 16 to 18 May 2025. The dialogue is on the topic of "Climate Change, Mountains, and the Future of Humanity" focusing mainly on the impacts of climate change that Nepal and a number of other countries around the world are facing. Deliberations on this theme is expected to contribute to identifying effective responses to combat climate change, by contributing to the sustainable development and complementing existing multilateral processes.

Discussions will also dwell upon the ‘organic link’ between mountains, oceans and many other ecosystems. Largely, the dialogue will be an opportunity to devise on the actions needed to realize the Sustainable Development Goals and commitment made under the Paris Agreement to limit the global temperature increase to 1.5 °C to avoid the worst impacts of climate change.

== Programme ==
The Programme of the first Sambaad includes the following:

1. Opening Session
2. Plenary Session
3. 12 parallel sessions
4. Closing session

In addition to the above, there will be many sideline events on climate, mountain, pollution etc. The full details of the programme can be found at https://sagarmathasambaad.org/programme/

== Participants ==
Invitations for the first Sagarmatha Sambaad are being sent out to around 300 invitees from over 50 countries, representing a cross-section of stakeholders including heads of state, ministers, senior government officials; heads of UN agencies; noted climate scientists, experts, scholars, and researchers; entrepreneurs; influential media persons, celebrities, and activists; emerging youth, women, and community leaders; and heads of INGOs and civil society organizations.

Keynote speakers and other speakers will address the inaugural and closing sessions according to their respective protocol categories in alphabetical order. Moderators and panelists for thematic sessions will speak in the open format, without protocol precedence.

Participation is by invitation only. Invited participants are requested to confirm their participation and register by writing an email to Sagarmatha Sambad Secretariat.

== Venues for 2025 ==
The Sambaad sessions will be held at The Soaltee Kathmandu.
