= Gautam Buddha International Cricket Stadium =

Cricket stadium in Bharatpur, Nepal

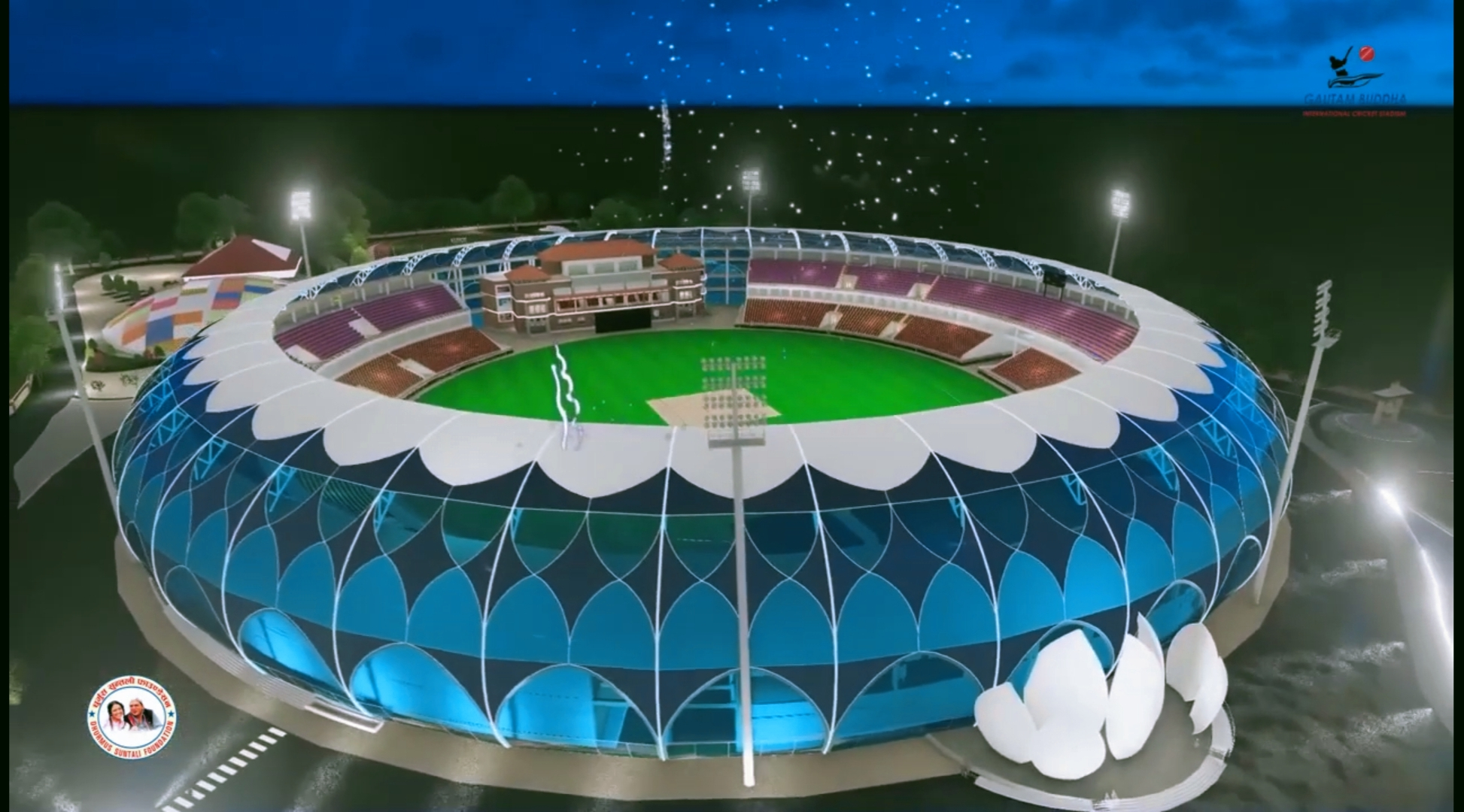
- The stadium under construction in 2018
- Interactive map of Gautam Buddha International Cricket Stadium

Ground information
- Location: Bharatpur metropolitan city-16, Rampur, Chitwan
- Country: Nepal
- Coordinates: 27°39′50″N 84°20′48″E
- Establishment: 2018; 8 years ago
- Capacity: 30,000 (Under construction)
- Owner: Government of Nepal
- Operator: Bagmati Province cricket team
- Tenants: Bagmati Province cricket team
- End names
- n/a n/a

Team information
Nepal cricket team
Chitwan Tigers
- As of January 2027; Source: ESPN Cricinfo

Gautam Buddha International Cricket Stadium (Nepali: गौतम बुद्ध अन्तर्राष्ट्रिय क्रिकेट रङ्गशाला), often abbreviated as GBICS, is a cricket stadium being built at Bharatpur, Nepal. As of July 2020, 15% of the overall work has been completed.

Currently, the physical progress of this stadium is around 59% as of July 2026.[https://ekantipur.com/sports/2026/07/23/en/gautam-buddha-cricket-stadium-will-41-percent-of-the-work-be-completed-in-6-months-53-43.html]

This stadium is also known as Bharatpur Cricket Stadium due to the location of ground at Bharatpur, Chitwan. It will be the largest cricket stadium in the Bagmati Province by capacity.

As of August 2026, about 60 percent of the construction work on the Gautam Buddha International Cricket Stadium in Bharatpur, Nepal, is completed. The final deadline to finish the project is January 6, 2027.

== History ==
The campaign for the stadium was started by the Dhurmus-Suntali Foundation. The stadium gets its name from the nearby situated site of Lumbini where Buddha was born. Construction was scheduled to be completed by 2021. The 3D design of the stadium has been completed. The entrance of the stadium resembles traditional Nepalese architecture. The stadium also have two grounds for practice on its outskirts.

The land for the construction has been provided by the Government of Nepal through Bharatpur Metropolitan City. The co-founder of the Dhurmus-Suntali foundation Sitaram Kattel says that the stadium will be funded by generous donors from all around the world. He hopes that if the donations are not sufficient then the Government will provide funds to finish the project.

The government has decided to take ownership of the Gautam Buddha International Cricket Stadium in Chitwan and complete the stadium. A meeting of the cabinet held on Monday made the decision to this effect.

The construction work of the Bharatpur-based stadium was halted in March 2022 after Dhurmus-Suntali Foundation withdrew from the construction of the stadium after not being able to pay the amount of materials purchased on loan.

Although the Foundation handed over the ownership of the stadium to the Bharatpur Metropolis, it was not clear how to proceed with the rest of its construction work.

For the stadium, the Bagmati State government announced that it would contribute Rs 300 million, Bharatpur Metropolitan City Rs 160 million, and the District Coordination Committee Rs 22 million.

== See also ==
- List of cricket grounds in Nepal
