= Meri Bassai =

Nepali television show

- Opening Title Screen of Meri Bassai
- Nepali: मेरी बास्सै
- Genre: Sitcom; Drama
- Created by: Daman Rupakheti; Sitaram Kattel; Kedar Ghimire
- Written by: Kunjan Bhattarai
- Story by: Sitaram Kattel
- Directed by: Daman Rupakheti
- Starring: Kedar Ghimire; Suraj Chapagain; Kunjana Ghimire; Wilson Bikram Rai; Buddhi Tamang; Laxmi Giri; Ratna Prajapati; Niru Khadka
- Theme music composer: Shankhar Adhikari 'Ghayal'
- Opening theme: "Ekai chhin Fursad chhaina"
- Ending theme: "Je gare ni sukha chhaina"
- Composer: Chetan Sapkota
- Country of origin: Nepal
- Original language: Nepali
- No. of episodes: 925

Production
- Producer: Suman Khatiwada
- Production locations: Kathmandu, Nepal
- Cinematography: Dilip Bista
- Editor: Rabin Bhatta
- Camera setup: Multiple camera
- Running time: 22 minutes
- Production company: Media Hub Pvt. Ltd

Original release
- Network: Nepal Television
- Release: 2006 – present

Meri Bassai (Nepali: मेरी बास्सै) is a Nepali sitcom television series which began in 2006 and is still continuing. It has become the longest running TV sitcom in Nepal. Sitaram Kattel is the script writer, co-director and one of the major actors of the sitcom.

== Cast ==
=== Main ===
- Kedar Ghimire as Magne Budho and Chaudhaghare Dada (left Meri Bassai)
- Sitaram Kattel as Dhurmuse, husband of Suntali; Wada Adhyakshya, leader of village; Khadka Ji, husband of Apsara; Khadananda Guru, the guru who sees the future; Muskaan Pasa, who loves Fatauri Budhi; and Aite, husband of Jhumri; and various other characters (left Meri Bassai)
- Sunita Gautam Bajgain as Muiya, wife of Magne Budho
- Kunjana Ghimire as Suntali, wife of Dhurmush and Jhumri, wife of Aite and Fatauri Budhi, most talkative woman (left Meri Bassai)
- Suraj Chapagain as Bandre, brother of Muyia
- Surbir Pandit as Darhi Budho, father of Dhurmush
- Surendra K.C. as Mulaa Saag, father of Suntali
- Palpasa Dangol as Chamsuri, mother of Suntali

=== Recurring ===
- Wilson Bikram Rai as Takme Budha who got Victoria Cross in World War as Gurkha (left Meri Bassai)
- Suman Jyoti Neupane as Lyangre Dada, friend of dhurmus and hanumane (left Meri Bassai)
- Niru Khadka as Thyaas Kumari, sister of Dhurmush
- Raju Paudel as Raju Master, brother of Magne Budho (left Meri Bassai)
- Marichman Shrestha as Balchhi Dhurbe, Chairman of Fishing Federation (left Meri Bassai)
- Goma Guragain as the tree, episode 246
- Ram Chandra Adhikari as Gokte Kaji, the richest person of village
- Sunil Thapa as a Sher Singh (Mama)
- Ratna Prajapati as Mr. Andrew Bynum
- Grady Kepler as Badaray Kancho, the monkey
- Anju Thapa as wife of Raju Master (left Meri Bassai)
- Debu Baral as Sudurpaschime Saalo
- Laxmi Shrestha as Apsara, wife of Khadka Ji
- Kamal Mainali as Jwai Narayan
- Raja Rajendra Pokharel as Chauraasi Baje or Sushil Koirala, prime minister of Nepal
- Kumar Shrestha as Farsilal who loves Thyas Kumari
- Samjhana Acharya as Mudki Samjhana
- Buddhi Tamang as Hanumane
- Rajani Gurung as Mangali, wife of Hanumane

=== Cameo appearance ===
- Suleman Shankar as Eku (jungle man) (only appeared in some episodes a few years ago)
- Rajesh Hamal as Maha Nayak Rajesh Hamal
- Bhuwan K.C. as Bhuwan KC (special appearance)
- Sandesh Lamichhane as Batare Kanchha; reporter
- Rejina Upreti as Herself
- Rekha Thapa as Herself
- Sachin Pariyar as a child who came from Western part of Nepal
- Harisha Baniya as Hariya

== Plot summary ==
Meri Bassai revolves around the daily happenings of a small village in a hilly region of Nepal. Generally, Dhurmush (Sitaram Kattel) does some bad act like stealing or deceiving someone. Every time he tries to escape from punishment, however he gets caught at the end and put in prison at Thokthake Prahari Chauki, Kusunde by Himal Ashahi. But somehow he escapes from the jail. He learns the lesson from his act, but continues to his next crime. His wife Suntali (Kunjana Ghimire) and his father tell him not to continue such crime but it makes no difference to him. Suntali is also the most talkative person in the village.

Magne Budho (Kedar Ghimire) always borrows things from villagers. He does not have front teeth and always says "aile lattale dera bariko patama puryaidinxu." Muiyya is the wife of Magne Budha, and Bandre is his brother-in-law.

Balxi Dhurbe is the fisher and Raju Master is the master.

Mulako saag and Chamsuri are the parents of Suntali.

The basic story of Meri Bassai shows the problems and livelihood of rural people of Nepal.
