= Ramite =

2021 novel by Jason Kunwar

- Cover page
- Author: Jason Kunwar
- Original title: रमिते
- Language: Nepali
- Genre: Contemporary fiction
- Published: February 13, 2021
- Publisher: Red Panda Books
- Publication place: Nepal
- Media type: Print
- Pages: 282
- Awards: Madan Puraskar, 2077 BS (Shortlisted)
- ISBN: 9789937085373

Ramite (Nepali: रमिते, lit. 'The spectator') is a 2021 Nepali novel by Jason Kunwar. It was published on February 13, 2021 by Red Panda Books. It is debut book of the author who is a musician and a part of a band called 'Night'. The book was shortlisted for the Madan Puraskar.

The book is a part a project consisting of four sections. The future installments will be in musical performances, arts and films. The project is a collaboration between various musicians, artists, photographers, illustrators and filmmakers.

== Synopsis ==
The novel is set in a fictional world, and has been told by multiple narrators. It consists of various songs, sketches and fictional scripts. The book depicts the story of human civilization, societies and various human instincts that mirrors our world.

== Reception ==
The book was shortlisted for Madan Puraskar, 2077 BS alongside Eklavya Ko Debre Haat by Giri Shreesh Magar, Kariya by Krishna Abiral, Kalpa Grantha by Kumar Nagarkoti, Nrityakshar Vigyan by Bhairab Bahadur Thapa, Filingo by Prabha Baral, Fulange by Lekhnath Chettri, Mokshabhumi by Keshav Dahal, and Limbuwan Ko Etihasik Dastawej Sangrah by Bhagi Raj Ingnam.

== Release ==
The book was launched on February 13, 2021 in Patan Museum located in Patan Durbar Square. Kunwar's band Night and some other artists performed during the launch event.

== See also ==
- Mokshabhumi
- Limbuwanko Etihasik Dastavej Sangraha
- Pagal Basti
