= Mann (novel) =

1957 Nepali novel by Leeladhwaj Thapa

- Cover page of the book
- Author: Leeladhwaj Thapa
- Original title: मन
- Language: Nepali
- Genre: Fiction
- Published: 1957
- Publisher: Sajha Prakashan
- Publication date: 1957
- Publication place: Nepal
- Media type: Print (Paperback)
- Pages: 244
- Award: Madan Puraskar (2014 BS)
- ISBN: 9789937321167

Mann (Nepali: मन, lit. 'Heart') is a 1957 Nepali novel by Leeladhwaj Thapa. It was published in 1957 by Sajha Prakashan. It is the third novel by Thapa, who had previously written Shanti and Purvasmriti. Mann won the Madan Puraskar that same year. The book was reprinted by Book Hill Publication on December 4, 2020.

== Synopsis ==
The book is set in 2012-2013 BS. Mann is the lead character who faces abandonment and navigates the struggles of a patriarchal society. The novel portrays the various challenges she encounters in her life.

== Reception ==
The book was the first novel to won the Madan Puraskar 1957 (2014 BS). The Madan Puraskar was first awarded in 1956 (2013 BS) to three non-fiction books, Hamro Lok Sanskriti by Satya Mohan Joshi, General Bhimsen Thapa Ra Tatkalin Nepal by Chittaranjan Nepali and Adhikbibhav Sthirbidhoot Utpadhak by Balram Joshi.

== See also ==
- Basain
- Shirishko Phool
- Sumnima
