= General Bhimsen Thapa Ra Tatkalin Nepal =

1956 book by Chittaranjan Nepali

- Sixth edition
- Author: Chittaranjan Nepali
- Original title: जनरल भीमसेन थापा र तत्कालीन नेपाल
- Language: Nepali
- Subject: Bhimsen Thapa
- Genre: Biography
- Published: 1956
- Publisher: Ratna Pustak Bhandar
- Publication date: 1956
- Publication place: Nepal
- Media type: Print (Paperback)
- Pages: 297
- Award: Madan Puraskar
- ISBN: 9993304204
- Preceded by: Ma Lumanka

General Bhimsen Thapa Ra Tatkalin Nepal (Nepali: जनरल भिमसेन थापा र तत्कालिन नेपाल, lit. 'General Bhimsen Thapa and the-then Nepal') is a historical book by Chittaranjan Nepali. It is a biography of the first prime minister of modern Nepal, Bhimsen Thapa. It was published in 1956 (2013 BS) and won the first-ever Madan Puraskar.

== Background ==
The book was funded by Nepal Sanskritik Sangh (Nepal Cultural Association), a governmental body. Nepali was already established as a poet before publishing the book. Nepali was 26 years old when he completed the book.

== Synopsis ==
Bhimsen Thapa was born on August 1775 in Gorkha district of Nepal to Amar Singh Thapa and Satyarupa Maya. He was taken to Kathmandu where he rose to the rank of Kaji. He played a key part in the expansion of Nepalese kingdom and during the Anglo-Nepalese War. He was imprisoned during the later part of his life and died of a suicide in 1839.

== Reception ==
The book won the first ever Madan Puraskar along with Hamro Lok Sanskriti by Satya Mohan Joshi and Adhikbibhav Sthirbidhoot Utpadhak by Bala Ram Joshi in 1956 (2013 BS).

== See also ==
- Hamro Lok Sanskriti
- Karnali Lok Sanskriti
- Mahakavi Devkota
