= Nar Bahadur Saud =

Nepalese writer (born 1963)

- नरबहादुर साउद
- Born: 16 February 1963 (age 63); Baitadi district, Nepal
- Occupations: Writer, Researcher
- Notable work: Nepalko Balinali ra Tinko Digo Kheti
- Awards: Madan Puraskar (2009)

Nar Bahadur Saud (Nepali: नरबहादुर साउद) (born 16 February 1963) is an agriculturist and Madan Puraskar–winning writer. Saud is paralyzed from the waist down because of a road accident. Wheel-chair bound, he worked on a book for ten years. The book was published in 2009 and won the Madan Puraskar for the same year.

He graduated in agriculture from Palampur in India and started work as an officer in the National Agriculture Research Council. Before the accident, he was working as a Technical Officer of Dairy Development Corporation.

== Biography ==
He was born as the first child of mother Dharma Devi Saud and father Dhan Bahadur Saud on 16 February 1963 (4 Falgun 2019 BS) in the rural Baitadi district of Nepal. He completed his studies up to SLC in the village school. After completing his ISc. studies from Rampur-based Agricultural Science Campus in Chitwan, he went to Himachal Pradesh in India to graduate in Agricultural Science on a Government Scholarship.

After completing his studies, he worked for one year at the Nepal Agricultural Research Council (NARC) in Khumaltar. In 2048 BS, he was transferred to Dairy Development Corporation. While on duty, he traveled from Butwal to Surkhet to participate in a project program in Surkhet but during the night, his vehicle met with an accident at Banke's Kasum. He suffered serious injuries to his lower body.

== Notable works ==
In 2009, he published a book called Nepalko Balinali ra Tinko Digo Kheti, for which he was awarded with the prestigious Madan Puraskar.

== See also ==
- Bhagiraj Ingnam
- Satya Mohan Joshi
- Chittaranjan Nepali
