= Karunakar Vaidya =

Nepalese writer (1914–1989)

- करुणाकर वैद्य
- Born: 1914; Swath Narayansthan, Lalitpur
- Died: 1989 (aged 74–75)
- Occupation: Writer
- Awards: Madan Puraskar (1957, 1979)

Karunakar Vaidya (Nepali: करुणाकर वैद्य; 1914-1989) was a Nepalese writer and folklorist. He is one of the few writers to win the Madan Puraskar, the most prestigious literary award in Nepali literature, twice. He won the award for Mitrika Udhyog in 1956 and for Nepalko Paramparagat Parbidhi in 1979.

== Biography ==
Vaidya was born in 1914 (1971 BS Shrawan) in Swath Narayansthan, Lalitpur.

He received the prestigious Madan Puraskar for his books Mitrika Udhyog in 2014 BS (c. 1956) and Nepalko Paramparagat Parbidhi in 2036 BS (c. 1979).

He died in 2046 BS (c. 1989).

== Notable works ==
- Mitrika Udhyog (1956; transl. Ceramic Industry)
- Nepalko Paramparagat Parbidhi (1979)
- Nepalko Lok Katha Sangraha (Nepalese Folktales Collection)
- Nepali Dantya Katha Sangraha (Nepalese Oral Tales Collection)
- Bishwa Lok Katha Sangraha (World Folktales Collection)
- Aanchalik Nepali Lok Katha (Nepalese Regional Folktales)

== See also ==
- Nityaraj Pandey
- Leeladhwaj Thapa
- Satya Mohan Joshi
