= Chuda Mani Regmi =

Nepalese writer (born 1937)

Chuda Mani Upadhaya Regmi
- चूडामणि रेग्मी
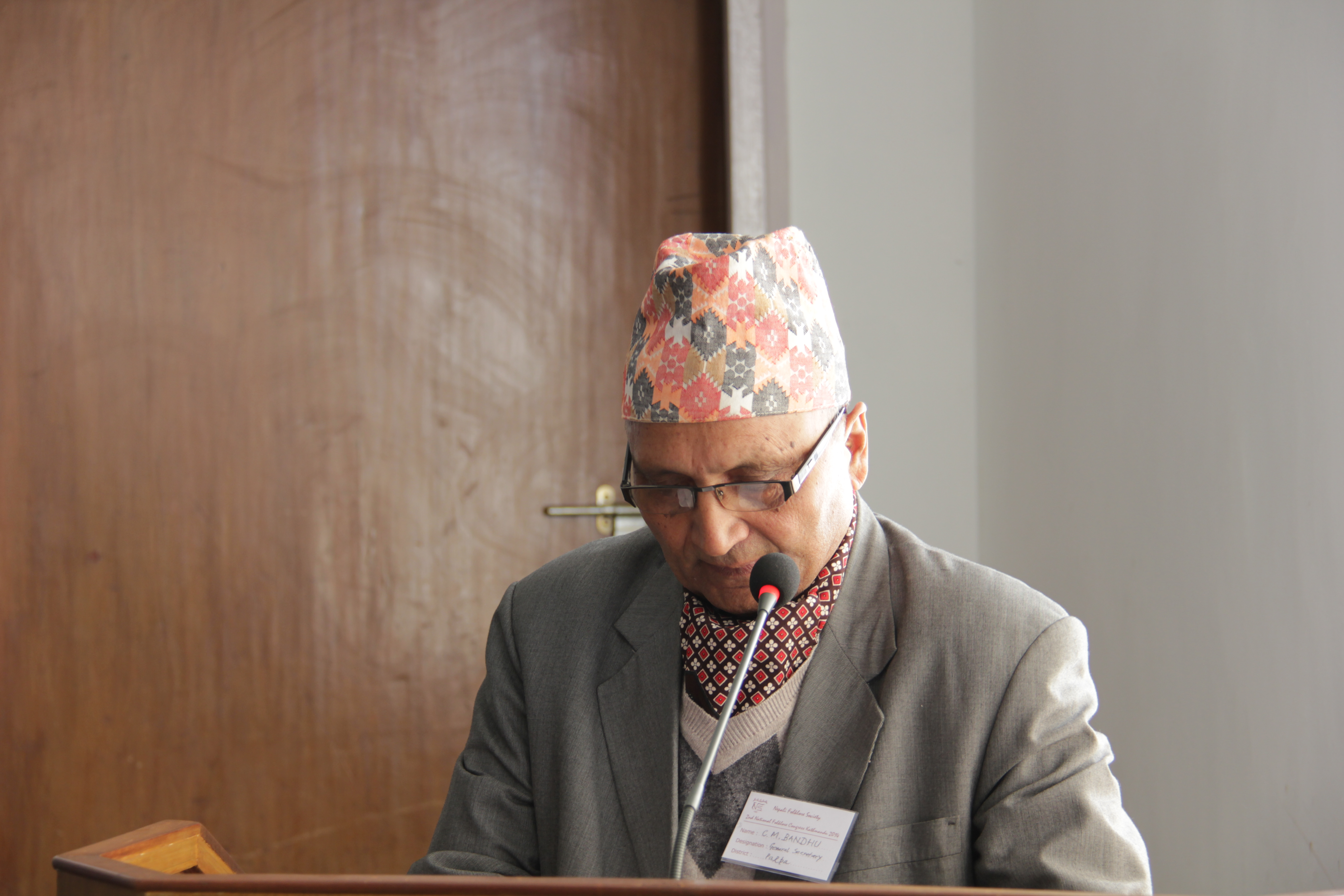
- Regmi at Folklore Congress Nepal
- Born: 11 March 1937 (age 88); Wana, Sankhuwasabha
- Other names: Chudamani Bandhu
- Occupations: Linguist, writer
- Notable work: Karnali Lok Sanskriti
- Spouse: Bed Kumari Dahal (m. 1949)
- Parents: Pitambar Regmi (father); Khileswari Devi(mother)
- Awards: Madan Puraskar; Sajha Puraskar

Chuda Mani Upadhaya Regmi (Nepali: चूडामणि रेग्मी) is a Nepalese writer and linguist. He has published multiple books related to Nepali language.

== Early life and education ==
Regmi was born on 11 March 1937 (29 Chaitra 1993) in Wana, Sankhuwasabha district in eastern region of Nepal to father Pitambar Regmi and mother Khileswari Devi. He completed his schooling in Sanskrit language. For his IA degree in Benaras, he continued his Sanskrit studies and studied BA at Mahendra College in Biratnagar.

== Literary career ==
In 1968, he published the Nepali Bhashako Utpatti. Regmi, Satya Mohan Joshi, Pradip Rimal, Bihari Krishna Shrestha, and Sthirjunga Bahadur published Karnali Lok Sanskriti which won the Madan Puraskar, Nepal's highest literary honour. The prize money was divided among the authors. He played an active role in Jharro Andolan, a Nepali language movement.

He also taught at the Mechi Multiple Campus in Jhapa. He taught for 34 years until he retired in 2002.

== Awards ==
He has won various awards including the Mahakavi Devkota Puraskar (2015), the Gopal Pande Asim Award (2005), the Sajha Puraskar, and the Madan Puraskar.

== Notable works ==
- Nepali Sahitya ko Itihas
- Bhasa Bigyan
- Karnali Lok Sanskriti (Vol. 4 - Bhasa)
- Devkota
- Sajha Kavita
- Nepali Loksahitya
- Sinjali: Studies in Linguistic Behaviour

== Personal life ==
He married Bed Kumari Dahal on 11 December 1949 (26 Mangshir 2006) at the age of 13. They have 2 children (1 son and 1 daughter).

== See also ==
- Satya Mohan Joshi
- Chittaranjan Nepali
