= Sahi Shabda =

Nepali thesaurus by Fr. William Bourke SJ

- Author: Father William Bourke SJ
- Original title: सही शब्द
- Language: Nepali
- Genre: Thesaurus
- Published: 1995
- Publication date: 1995
- Publication place: Nepal
- Awards: Madan Puraskar

Sahi Shabda (Nepali: सही शब्द) is a 1995 Nepali language thesaurus written by Canadian Jesuit Father William Bourke SJ. It is the first comprehensive Nepali thesaurus. It was published 1995 and won the Madan Puraskar, 2051 B.S.; the highest literary honor of Nepal.

== About the author ==
Father William Bourke SJ was born on May 28, 1925, in Halifax, Nova Scotia. He moved to Darjeeling as a Canadian Jesuit missionary in 1954 and served as a Headmaster for St. Robert's School, Darjeeling from 1981 to 1990. He also translated the Bible into Nepali and wrote a book called 'Proverbs for Today', a collection of Nepali and English proverbs. He died on November 29, 2019, of natural causes, aged 94.

== Reception ==
The book won the Madan Puraskar. The award is given annually for a book in Nepali language by Madan Puraskar Guthi.

== See also ==
- Hamro Lok Sanskriti
- Karnali Lok Sanskriti
- Srasta ra Sahitya
