= Komalnath Adhikari =

Nepalese writer

Komalnath Adhikari (Nepali: कोमलनाथ अधिकारी) was a Nepalese writer and poet.

Adhikari was born in Duradanda, Lamjung District, Nepal.

In 1963, Adhikari won the Madan Puraskar, Nepal's highest literary honour, for his book Naisadhiya Charit.

== See also ==
- Satya Mohan Joshi
- Gopal Prasad Rimal
