= Sharada Sharma =

Nepali poet and writer

- शारदा शर्मा
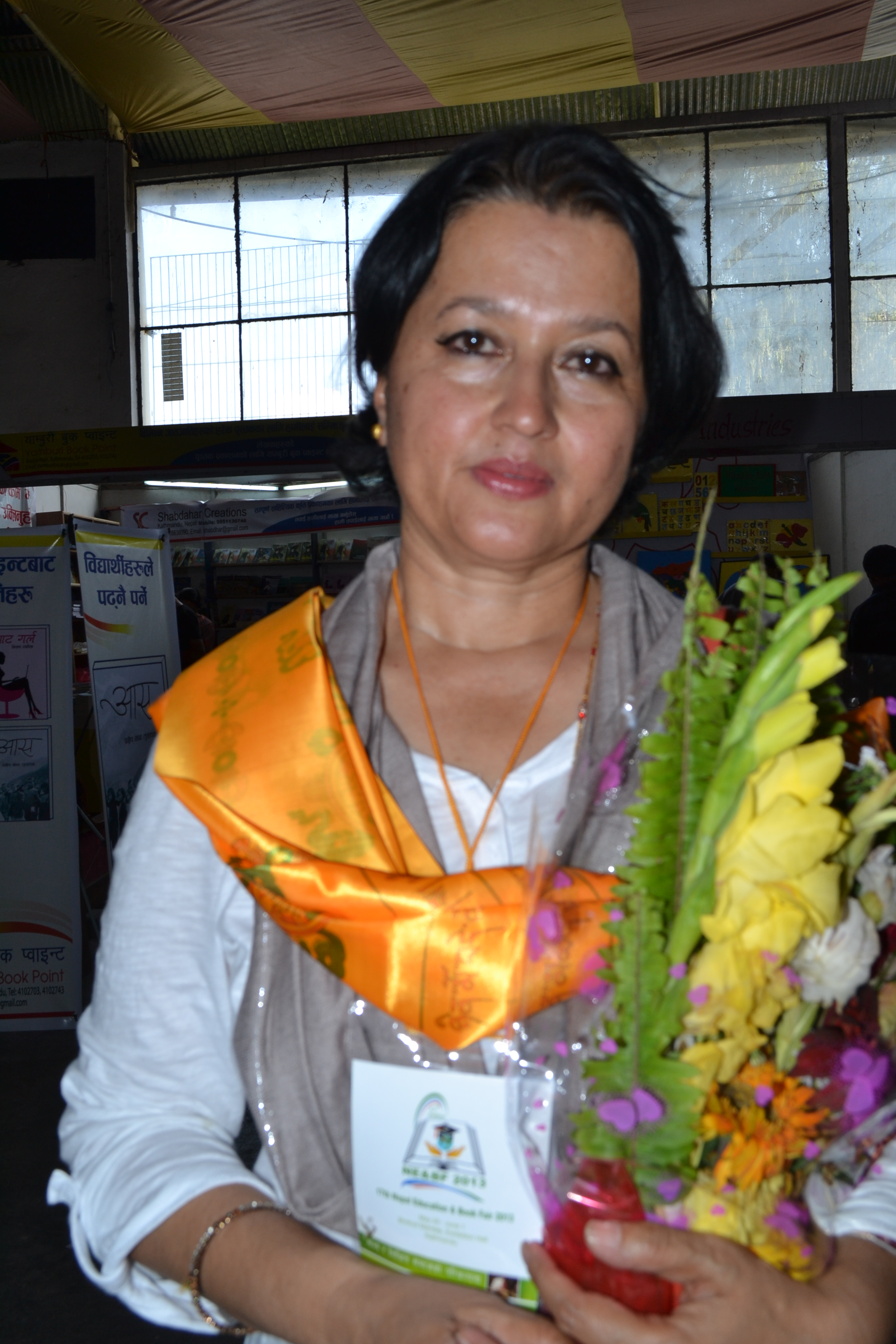
- Born: 1958 (age 67–68); Syangja, Nepal
- Education: Tribhuvan University
- Occupations: Writer and poet

Sharada Sharma (born 1958; Nepali: शारदा शर्मा) is a Nepali writer and poet. Her debut novel, Taap, won the 2012 Padmashree Sahitya Samman award.

== Early life and education ==
Sharada Sharma was born in 1958 in Syangja, Nepal. Her father was a writer and editor who contributed to various Nepalese publications. Sharma first began writing poetry at eight years old while in Pokhara, where she spent a portion of her childhood. A natural introvert, she found solace in writing.

With the support of her family, she attended Tribhuvan University in Kathmandu, where she studied science and then arts, eventually graduating with a master's degree.

== Career ==
Sharma first gained recognition in 1982 after publishing a poem in honor of the writer B. P. Koirala. In 1987, she published her first poetry collection, Boundless Emotions. This was followed in 1991 with the short story collection Ruins of Convictions and in 1992 with the poetry collection After the War. In addition to poetry and short stories, she produced a book-length study of Koirala's female characters in 1996.

Overall, she has written around a dozen books, including poetry, short stories, literary criticism, and novels.

Taap, her debut novel, was published in 2012 and won that year's Padmashree Sahitya Sammana, a prestigious Nepalese literary award. The novel weaves together narratives of various individuals from different backgrounds, switching perspectives throughout. It was followed by Kampa, a 2016 novel inspired by the April 2015 Nepal earthquake.

In 2020, her poetry collection Yatrama was shortlisted for the Madan Puraskar award, which was eventually won by Chandra Prakash Baniya's Maharani.

Sharma's writing often deals with themes of spirituality and mysteries of the universe, incorporating a woman's perspective. She conveys a feminist message in both her writing and her work as an activist, including with the Family Planning Association of Nepal.

== Personal life ==
In 1978, Sharma married the politician Narahari Acharya, with whom she has two children.

== Selected works ==
=== Poems ===
- Seemanta Anubhooti ("Boundless Emotions," 1987)
- Yuddhoparant ("After the War," 1992)
- Swarnasutra, ("Golden Rules," 1995)
- Yatrama (2019)

=== Short stories ===
- Aasthako Bhagnawasesh ("Ruins of Convictions," 1991)
- Agnisparsha ("A Touch of Fire," 2013)

=== Novels ===
- Taap ("Burning," 2012)
- Kampa ("Tremors," 2016)

=== Literary criticism ===
- B.P. Koiralaka Naaripatra: Drishtikon ra Aakangshya ("B.P. Koirala’s Women Characters: Perspectives and Expectations," 1996)
