= Nepalko Balinali ra Tinko Digo Kheti =

Nepali agricultural book

- Author: Nar Bahadur Saud
- Original title: नेपालका बालीनाली र तिनको दिगो खेती
- Language: Nepali
- Genre: Agricultural
- Publisher: Sajha Publications
- Publication date: 2010
- Publication place: Nepal
- Media type: Print
- Pages: 909
- Awards: Madan Puraskar
- ISBN: 978-99933-2-796-7

Nepalko Balinali ra Tinko Digo Kheti (Nepali: नेपालका बालीनाली र तिनको दिगो खेती, lit. 'Agricultural Crops of Nepal and Their Sustainable Farming') is an agricultural book by Nar Bahadur Saud. It was published in 2010 by Sajha Publications and won the Madan Puraskar, 2066 BS (c. 2009-2010).

== Background ==
Saud was paralyzed from the waist down by a road accident two decades ago. Wheel-chair bound, he had been working on the book for 10 years. He graduated in agriculture from Palampur in India and started work as an officer in the National Agriculture Research Council. Before the accident, he was working as a Technical Officer of Dairy Development Corporation (Nepal).

== Awards ==
The book won the Madan Puraskar for 2066 BS (c. 2009-2010). This was the first time in the past 50 years that a book on agriculture was awarded with Madan Puraskar. Before this, Uddyan (garden) written by Gangabikram Sijapati was awarded Madan Puraskar in 2015 BS (1958).

== See also ==
- Hamro Lok Sanskriti
- Makaiko Kheti
- Limbuwanko Etihasik Dastavej Sangraha
