= Bhairav Bahadur Thapa =

Nepali dance director and scholar

Bhairab Bahadur Thapa
- भैरव बहादुर थापा
- Born: 17 February 1933 (age 93); Kamal Pokhari, Kathmandu, Nepal
- Occupations: Dancer, Choreographer, Dance Scholar, Writer
- Notable work: peacock Dance, Yak Dance, Kite Dance, Khukuri Dance, Ballet Dance, Opera Dance, Calisthenics Dance, Cultural Dance, Padma sambhav Dance, Development and cultural activist of Nepali folk dance. दोहारी गीत प्रतियोगिता, हिड्दा हिड्दै बनेका तस्बिरहरु, नृत्याक्षर विज्ञान, Alpha Science of Dance

Bhairab Bahadur Thapa (born 17 February 1933) is a Nepalese dance director, choreographer, and scholar. He is considered as the first dance director of a country called Nepal. Thapa passed the examination from the Public Service Commission in 2018 BS (1961–1962) and started working as a dance director in the cultural institute. After retiring from the institute, Thapa opened a dance troupe and continued his choreography work. Hundreds of artists who have taken dance training with him are established in the Nepali art field.

== Early life ==
Thapa was born on 17 February 1933 (6 Falgun 1989 BS) in Kamal Pokhari, Kathmandu. He grew up in a musical family. Around 2005-6 BS, he travelled to Gorakhpur with his brother there he enlisted in the British army at the age of 17 after the end of Second World War and was posted in Malay in British Army First Six Battalion. He was known in army as 'Nepali Tarzan', 'Nepali Babu' and 'Dancer'. When he danced whole night during the coronation of Elizabeth II on June 2, 1953, the officers of the battalion were impressed and he was given a holiday for six months. He returned to Nepal on 19 June 1953 (6 Ashadh 2010 BS) and after nine day of his arrival, the playwright Bhim Nidhi Tiwari declared him as a Pratibhashali Kalakar (exemplary performer). On 19 September 1953 (3 Ashoj 2010 BS) he performed for an hour on the Nepal Farmer's Union's annual program.

== Establishment of Bhairab Nritya Dal ==
On 21 February 1954 he established an organization known as Bhairav Nritya Dal with the support of playwright Balkrishna Sama. He left the army after the establishment of the organization. He created various dance forms and amplified the existing cultural dance forms of Nepal through the organizations such as Machua, Raila, Tappa, Jhayure, Sorathi, etc.

== Introduction of Bhairab Nritya Dal ==
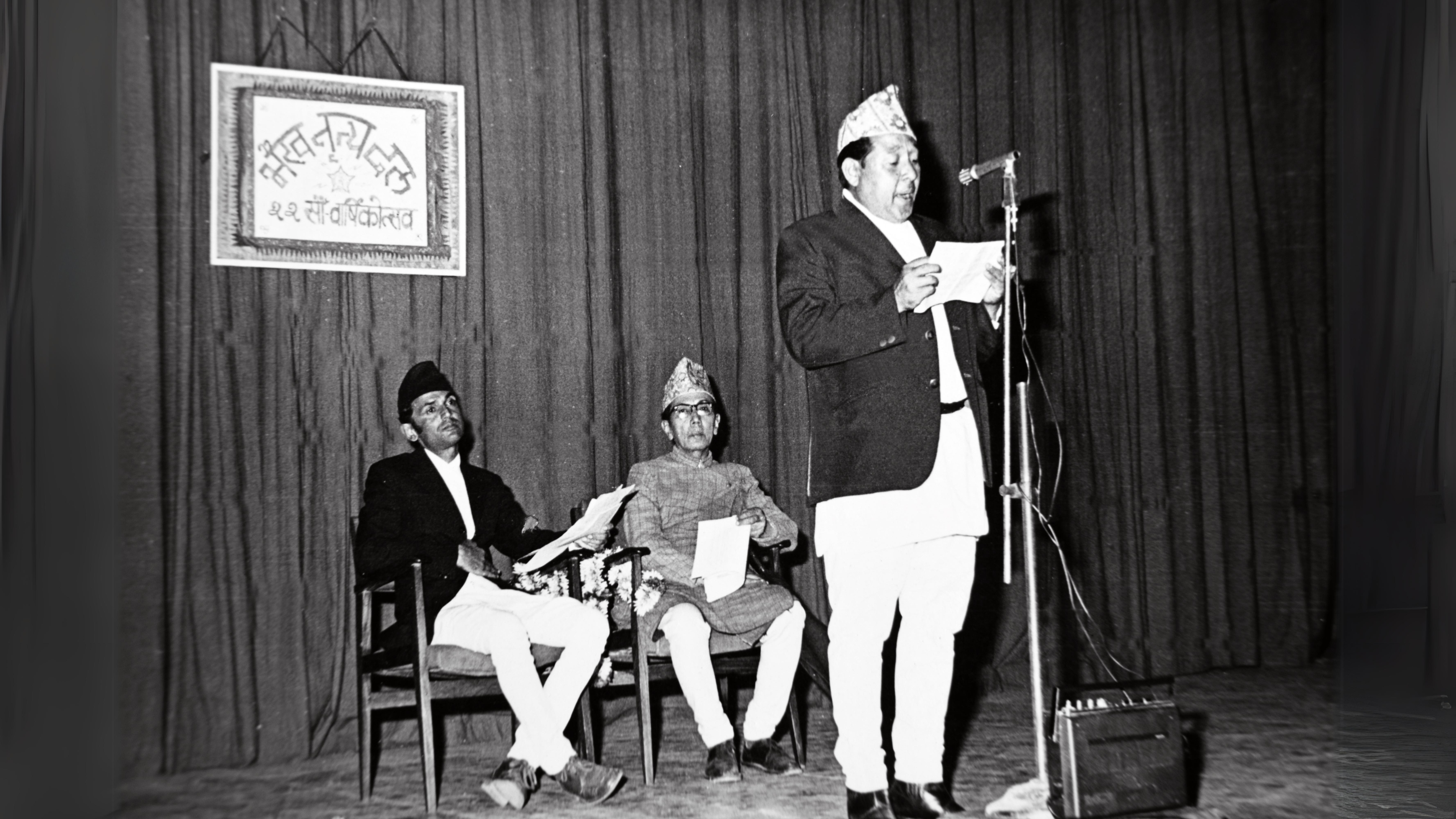
Bhairab Bahadur Thapa and Bal Krishna sama

Every year, traditional dances were performed only within one's own ethnic communities called Guthis at designated locations. Going to other places to perform dances was against tradition. This practice is still in continuation. Due to societal constraints and the fact that dancing in different villages for money was seen as disgraceful, only dances performed by traditional groups within their own communities existed in Nepal. However, in the face of such societal norms, a revolutionary change came when an aspiring artist, Bhairab Bahadur Thapa, established the "Bhairab Dance Ensemble" on the 10th of Falgun, 2010 B.S. (February 21, 1954 A.D.)

== The Cultural Journey of Bhairab Bahadur Thapa ==
=== Nepal and China Cultural Relationship ( July 9, 1956 A.D )< ===
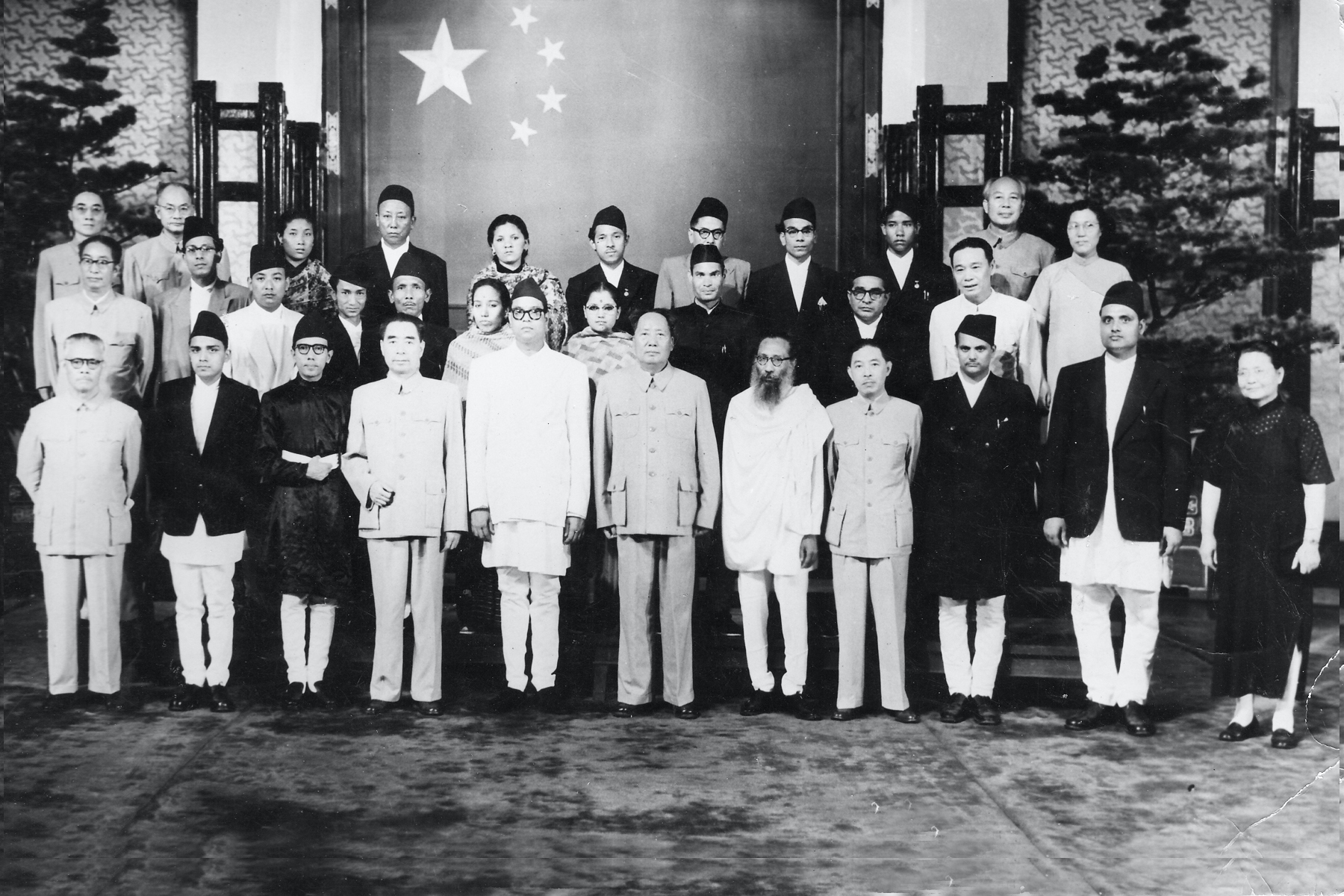
In the order of departure, the Nepali cultural delegation was accompanied by Chairman Mao Zedong and Prime Minister Zhou Enlai.

Bhairab Bahadur Thapa, a member of the first cultural representative delegation of the Nepal government, arrived in the vast land of China on July 9, 1956 AD (Asar 26, 2013 BS). He created a sensation in various regions by presenting his Nepali dance art on well-established stages and shook the hearts of millions of Chinese people. In particular, the then-Chinese Chairman Mao Zedong and the then-Chinese Prime Minister Zhou Enlai including other leaders watched in a we as Bhairab Bahadur Thapa presented Nepali dances and numerous emotional expressions on the colorful stage of China. In this way, Bhairab Bahadur Thapa became the first cultural ambassador of Nepal to China, successfully influencing millions of Chinese people through Nepali dances and various artistic expressions. He contributed significantly to Nepal and China's "sisterly" relationship in the field of culture.

The first Nepali dancer in India ( January 11, 1958 A.D. )

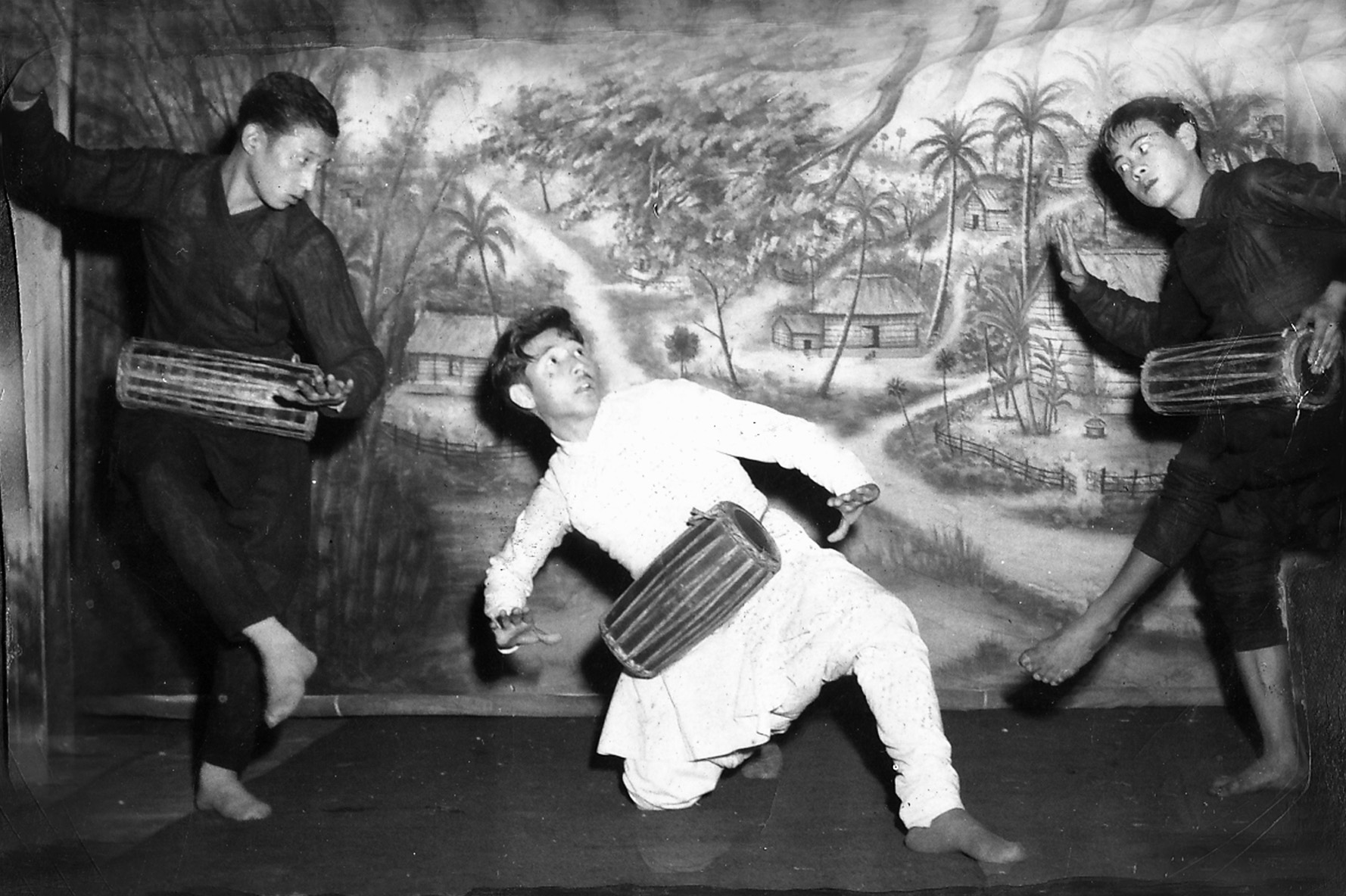
Former Indian Prime Minister Pandit Jawaharlal Nehru watched the "Echo Ballet" with interest, featuring Bhairab Bahadur Thapa in the center, Kokil Gurung on the right, and Kumar Nepali on the left.

The dancer Bhairab Bahadur Thapa, funded by himself, led his Bhairab Dance Ensemble to variouslocations in India, successfully presenting the first Nepali danceart in India. He is considered a legendary artist who achieved this feat.During his tour, on January 11, 1958, in the context of the 63rd Annual Congress of the Indian National Congress in Pragjyotishpur, Guwahati, Assam, Thapa's Bhairab Dance Ensemble had the opportunity to present a cultural program. During this occasion, prominent figures such as Indira Gandhi and 14-year-old Rajiv Gandhi, along with India's first Prime Minister, Pandit Jawaharlal Nehru, were present. Afterwitnessing the Bhairab Dance Troupe's cultural program, especially their “ECHO BALLET,” Pandit Nehru remarked, "After seeing the ‘ECHO BALLET’ dance of the Nepali Bhairab Party, I have changed my opinion about the dance art of the Nepali people. I am very pleased to see the elevated Nepali dance. I will meet you all in Kathmandu later." He further ordered related agencies to organize Nepali programs for another seven days. Additionally, he provided an opportunity for all members of the Bhairab Dance Ensemble to meet him and personally thanked them.

== ER Activities ==
Bhairab Bahadur Thapa along with his cultural team participated in different countries at the invitation of the government of different countries or at the invitation of non-governmental organizations.

1. Chairman of the People's Republic of China Mr. Mao Zedong, Prime Minister Mr. Chou-en-lai, Mr. Marshall Holung and Dr. Sungchung Leen, wife of Sun Yat Sen - 11 July 1956, Peking,

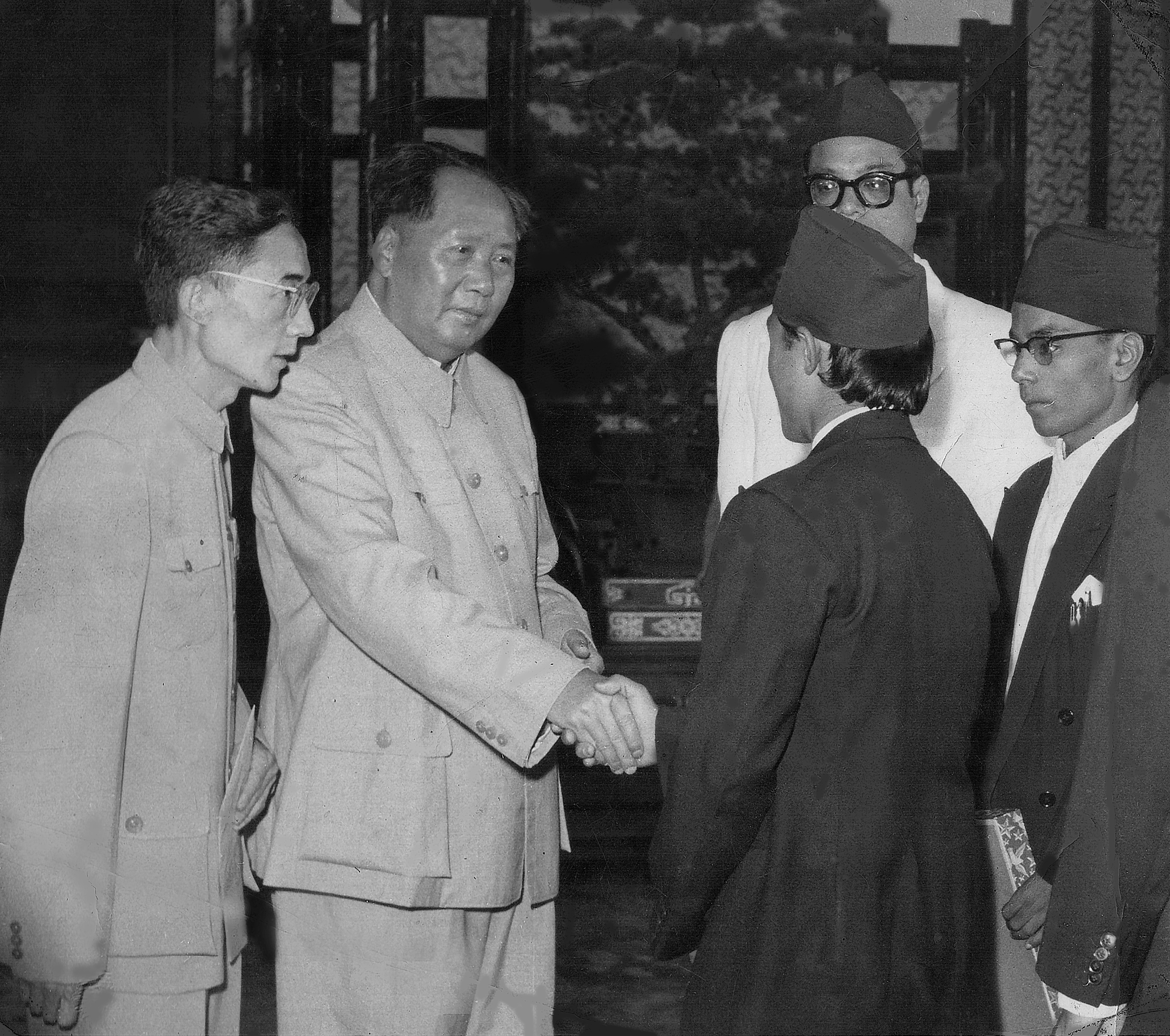
B.B. Thapa Meets Mao Zedong

2. Prime Minister of India Pt. Jawaharlal Nehru - 18 January 1958, Assam (on the occasion of Aya Jit Rabi Kshlmashb Kahatath Tjashcham Riylanchavak Kvakaksyal at Guwahati in the former state of Assam),

3. President of India Shri Zakir Hussain 22 February 1965, Delhi,

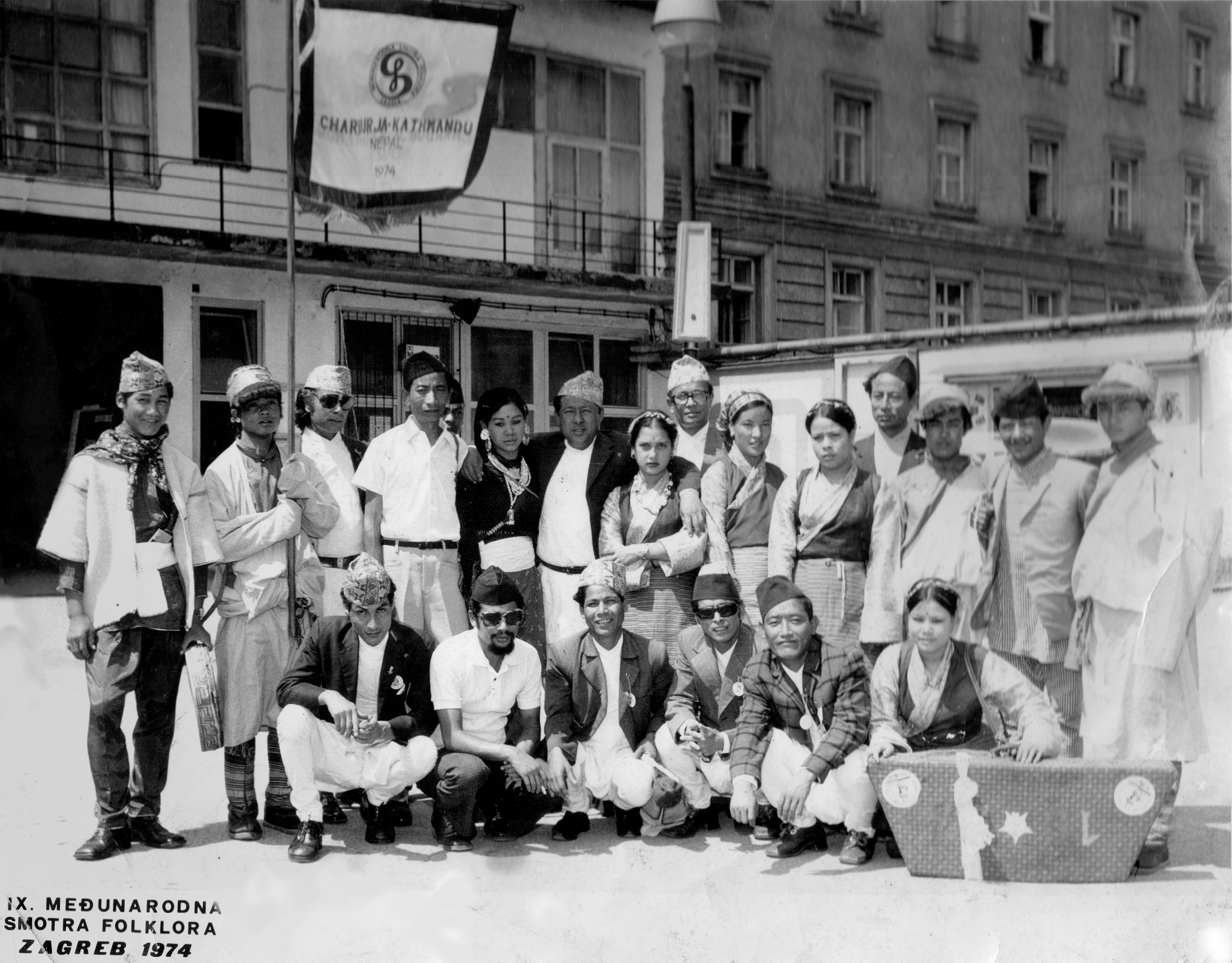
Bhairab Dance Ensemble in Zagreb.

4. General Secretary of the Soviet Communist Party and President Mr. Leonid Brezhnev - August 29, 1970, Moscow, 5. Mr. Marshall Tito, President of Yugoslavia - 21 July 1974, Zagreb,

6. Her Majesty Queen Fabiola of Belgium - 13 and 15 July 1974, Scotton,

7. Mr. Alberto Obligado, Assistant Director General and UNESCO Head Quarters in Paris, France - 8 August 1974, Paris,

When heads of state and national representatives of different countries came to Nepal, Bhairav Bahadur Thapa, who was the first dance director of the government of Nepal at that time, welcomed them with a cultural program on his stage:-

i. President of India Dr. Rajendra Prasad 22 October 1956

ii. To Mr. Zhou Enlai, Prime Minister of the People's Republic of China, 7 December 1956

iii. Shri Jawaharlal Nehru, Prime Minister of India, June 24, 1959

iv. Mr. Kliment Voroshilov, President of the Soviet Union - June 10, 1959

v. Her Majesty Queen Elizabeth II of the United Kingdom - 25 February 1961

vi. Shri Lal Bahadur Shastri, Minister Without Department of India - 21 February 1961

vii. Prime Minister of Verma Mr. U Nu - 8 January 1962

viii. Representatives of various countries attended the All Nepal Medical Conference- 1 November 1962

ix. His Excellency Ayub Khan, President of Pakistan - 10 May 1963

x. President of India Dr. Sarvapalli Radhakrishnan - 5 November 1963

xi. Delegates of the Indian Ocean countries to the Conference on Family Planning, May 3, 1964

xii. Maharaja Shri Madhav Rao Scindia of Gwalior, India - 16 April 1964

xiii. Prince Philip, Prince of Edinburgh, March 14, 1965

xiv. Vice Premier and Foreign Minister of the People's Republic of China Mr. Marshall Chen Yi 31 March 1965

xv. Mr. Heinrich Lübke, President of West Germany - 12 March 1967

xvi. President of Pakistan Shri Agha Muhammad Yahya Khan - 28 September 1970

xvii. Representatives of the various countries adopted at the 26th meeting of the Colombo Plan, 2 December 1977

== Works ==
He has published multiple books. He published a school curriculum book Nepali Nritya Ra Saririk Prabeshika in 2022 BS. In 2030 BS, he published a poetry collection called Dhoka. He has also written two autobiographies- Hindhda Hindhdai Baneka Tasbir Haru and Bhairav lai Herne Akhaharu. Bhairav lai Herne Akhaharu was published in 2009.

In 2020, Thapa wrote a book about difference forms of dance and the disciplines of Nepali dances known as Nrityakshar Bigyan. The book was shortlisted for Madan Puraskar for the year 2077 BS (2020). The book is being translated into English as Alphabetic Science of Dance and into Hindi by Chetan Karki.

== Awards ==
- Uttamshanti Award - 2065 B.S
- Bhimanidhi Tiwari Drama Literature Award - 2071 B.S.
- Nepal Music and Drama National Intelligence Award - 2071 B.S.
- Harish Bhuwan Chandra Award - 2077 B.S.
- Jagadamba Shree Award - 2077 B.S.
- Bhim Darshan Roka Ideal Master Honors and Awards - 2078 B.S.
- Shankar Lamichhane Samman- 2078 B.S.
- Nepal Music Association National Honors and Awards - 2079 B.S.
- Menkaji Gurung Memorial Honors and Awards - 2080 B.S.
- Rajendra Lakshmi Specific Dance Master National Honors and Awards - 2081

== See also ==
- Bhagi Raj Ingnam
- Shanti Thatal
- Bairagi Kainla
