= Madan Puraskar =

Nepali literary award

- Award for contributions to Nepali literature
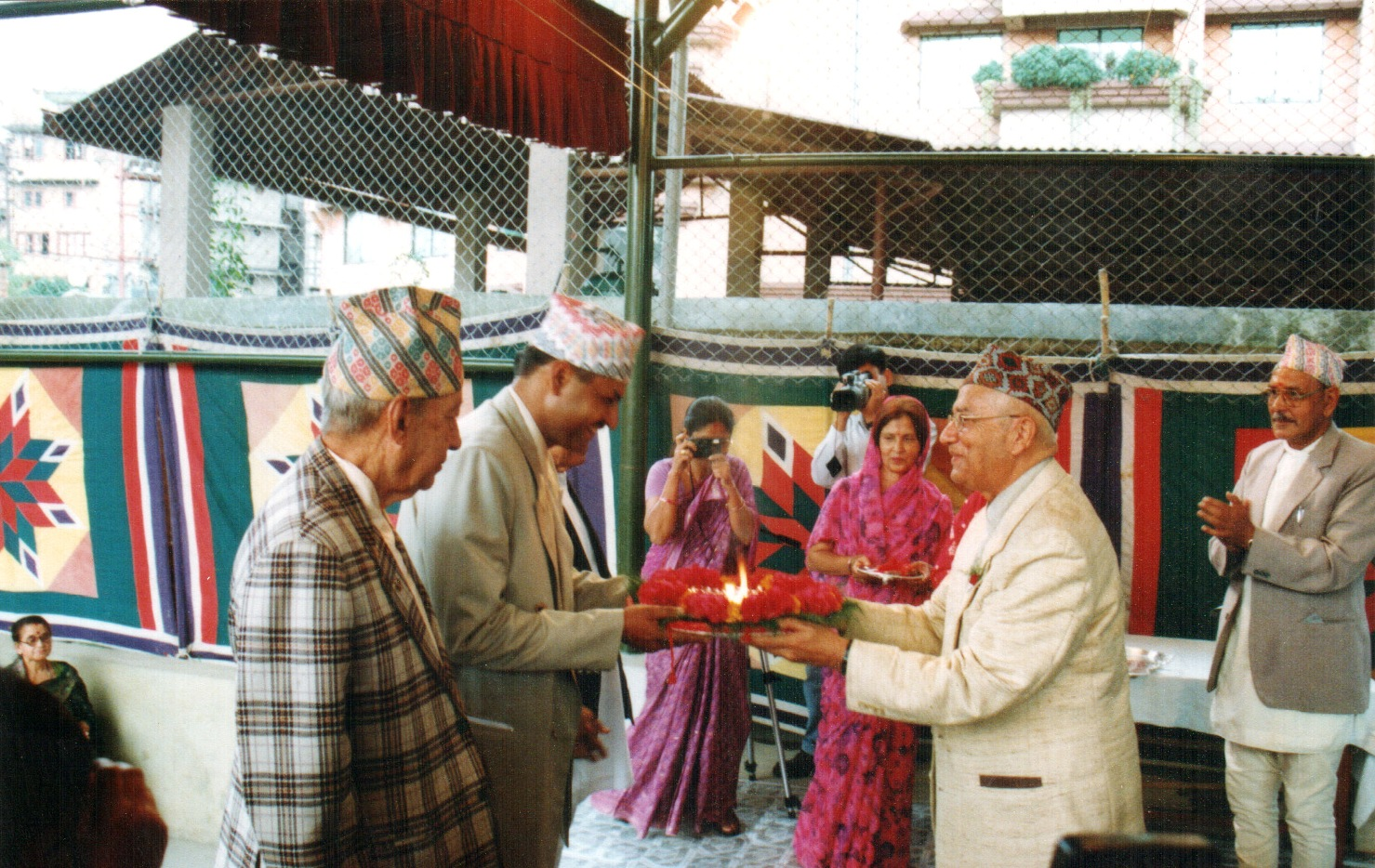
- Dinesh Adhikari accepting Madan Puraskar for Atirikta Abhilekh (2056 B.S.)
- Awarded for: Literary award in Nepal
- Sponsored by: Madan Puraskar Guthi
- Country: Nepal
- Eligibility: Book written in Nepali language
- Reward: रु 400,000
- Established: 1955; 71 years ago
- First award: 1956
- Final award: 2025

Highlights
- Most wins: Satya Mohan Joshi (3)
- No. of times awarded: 68
- First winner: Satyamohan Joshi, Chittaranjan Nepali, Dr. Balram Joshi
- Latest winner: Beena Joshi Rajbhandari (2025)
- Website: madanpuraskar.org

The Madan Puraskar (Nepali: मदन पुरस्कार) is a literary honor in Nepal which Madan Puraskar Guthi confers annually for an outstanding book in the Nepali language published within the calendar year. It is considered as the most prestigious literature award in Nepal. It is awarded on the day of Ghatasthapana every year alongside Jagadamba Shree Puraskar.

== History ==
The award was established by daughter in law of Prime Minister Chandra Shumsher JBR, Queen Jagadamba Kumari Devi, in memory of her husband late General Madan Shumsher JBR, on 26 September 1955. Since then it has been presented every year, except in 1974 and 1976. At the time of its establishment, the award prize was रु 4,000. On the Golden–Jubilee year 2005, the award prize was increased to रु 400,000.

== List of Winners and Short list by year ==
=== 2015 – 2025 ===
Year in B.S. (in CE)^{[a]}	Author	Work	Short list
2082 (2025)	Beena Joshi (Rajbhandari)	Newar Samudayka Paramparagat Mukundonach	Agyat – Keshavraj Gyawali; Itha – Keshav Dahal; Utkarsha – Lalit Bista; History of Simraungadh Connected with Nepal Mandala – Roshan Kumar Jha; Paridhi – Uma Subedi; Mahayug – Seema Aabhas; Newar Samudayka Paramparagat Mukundonach - Beena Joshi (Rajbhandari); Salah – Shravan Mukarung; Swasparsha – Dr. Navaraj KC; Hiund – Nadish
2081 (2024)	Chuden Kabimo	Urmaal	Chhaalbato – Ramesh Bhusal; Urmaal – Chuden Kabimo; Darjyu Sanlap – Kumari Lama; Panchatatwako Paalaam – Man Prasad Subba; Bahurupi – Shreyaj Subedi; Bhikshu, Byapar ra Bidroha – Sudheer Sharma; Hiuko geet – Tirtha Gurung
2080 (2023)	Mohan Mainali	Mukaam Ranamaidan	Damfuko Aatmalaap – Bhakta Syangtan; Mukaam Ranamaidan – Mohan Mainali; Noon-Tel – Jiwan Chhetri; Bhav Lipi – Bhavesh Bhumari, Pranita Chamling; Santras Ka Saathi Din – Roshan Thapa - Neerav
2079 (2022)	Bibek Ojha	Aaithan	Ijoriya – Subin Bhattarai; Aaithan – Bibek Ojha; Chakravyuhama Nepalko Jalsrot – Dwarika Nath Dhungel; Thangra – Pragati Rai; Maataako Ghar – Sanjaya Bista
2078 (2021)	Naba Raj Lamsal	Agni	Agni – Naba Raj Lamsal; Byutpattimulak Sanskrit-Nepali Sabdakosh – Neelmani Dhungana; Grishma Ko Neelo Batash – Damodar Pudasaini ‘Kishor’; Hiti Pranali – Padma Sunder Joshi; Licchavi Lipi – Naya Nath Paudel; Mahabhara – Basanta Basnet; Sati – Sujit Mainali; Yaadko Sanduk – Deepa Mewahang Rai
2077 (2020)	Bhagiraj Ingnam	Limbuwanko Etihasik Dastavej Sangraha	Eklavya Ko Debre Haat – Giri Shreesh Magar; Kariya – Krishna Abiral; Kalpa Grantha – Kumar Nagarkoti; Nrityakshar Vigyan – Bhairab Bahadur Thapa; Filingo – Prabha Baral; Fulange – Lekhnath Chettri; Mokshabhumi – Keshav Dahal; Ramite – Jason Kunwar; Limbuwan Ko Etihasik Dastawej Sangrah (1719–2020) – Bhagiraj Ingnam
2076 (2019)	Chandra Prakash Baniya	Maharani	Dharsaidharsako Chakrabyuh – Tirtha Shrestha; Jokerko Banduk – Bimal Nibha; Maharani – Chandra Prakash Baniya; Maharasnighantu (Part 1,2) – Yogi Dharmamaharas; Mohapat – Lalit Bista; Parityakta – Bhuwan Dhungana; Yatrama – Sharada Sharma
2075 (2018)	Yogesh Raj	Ranahar	Bichaarko Laas – Dhurba Sapkota; Ekadeshma – Sanu Sharma; Faatsung – Chuden Kabimo; Gya – Kumar Nagarkoti; Marichika – Mahesh Thapa; Okkal Dokkal Peepal Paat – Bindu Sharma; Ranahaar – Yogesh Raj
2074 (2017)	Neelam Karki Niharika	Yogmaya	Bhuiyan – Yangesh; Kairan – Dhruba Satya Pariyar; Himali Darshan – Mohan Baidya; Lumbini Gaun – Raj Manglak; Nathiya – Saraswati Pratikshya; Pathshala – Tirtha Gurung; Yaar – Nayan Raj Pandey; Yogmaya – Neelam Karki Niharika
2073 (2016)	Ghanashyam Kandel	Dhritarashtra	Dhritarastra – Ghanashyam Kandel; Chhaughar – Raj Sargam; Doha ko Sidha Udaan – Jaya Chhanchha; Guha, Guhalekh, Guhachitra Ebam Anya Sampada – Purushottam Lochan Shrestha; Ma Stri arthat Aaimai – Seema Aavaas; Pratinaayak – Hari Adhikari; Sagarmatha ko Gahirai – Nawaraj Parajuli; Shukra Rak Shastri ko Chasma – Rajendra Parajuli; Tapan – Sharad Poudel
2072 (2015)	Ramlal Joshi	Aina	Aamoi – Bhuwanhari Sigdel; Aina – Ramlal Joshi; Cheerharan – Nilam Karki Niharika; Nirban – Ghanashyam Khadka; Prasnaharuko Karkhana – Sarita Tiwari; Phirphire – Buddhisagar; Simanaka Rang Simanaka Tarang – Damodar Pudasaini Kishor

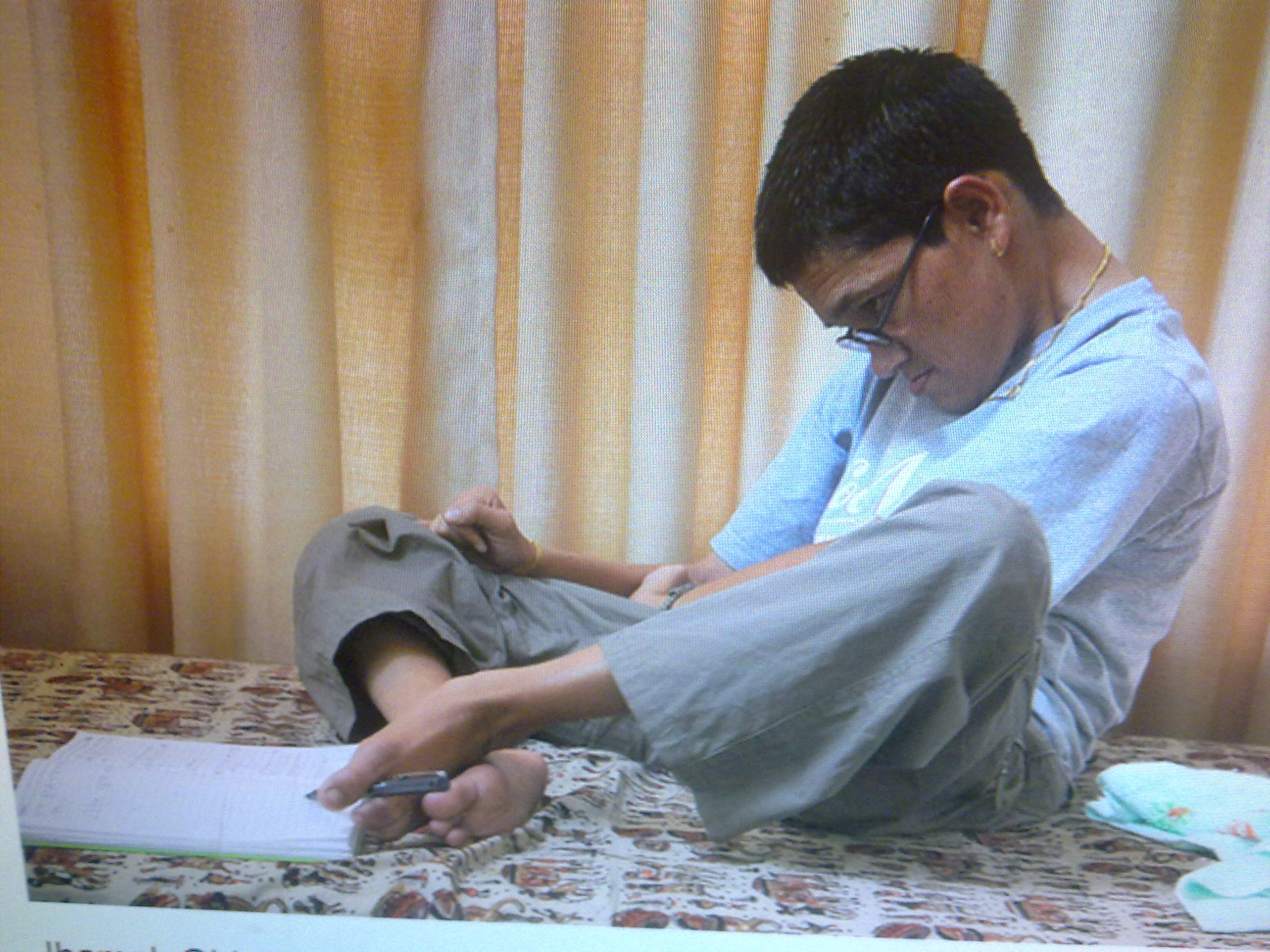
Jhamak Ghimire, the second woman winner of the award, won the award in 2010 for her memoir Jiwan Kada Ki Phool.

=== 2000 – 2014 ===
Before 2014 (2071 BS), shortlist was not published.

Year in B.S. (in CE)^{[a]}	Author	Work
2071 (2014)	Vijay Kumar Pandey	Khusi
2070 (2013)	Radha Paudel	Khalangama Hamala
2069 (2012)	Rajan Mukarung	Damini Bhir
2068 (2011)	Amar Neupane	Seto Dharti
2067 (2010)	Jhamak Ghimire	Jiwan Kada Ki Phool
2066 (2009)	Nar Bahadur Saud	Nepalko Balinali ra Tinko Digo Kheti
2065 (2008)	Yubraj Nayaghare	Ek Haatko Taali
2064 (2007)	Jagadish Ghimire	Antarmanko Yatra
2063 (2006)	Mahesh Bikram Shah	Chhapamar ko Chhoro
2062 (2005)	Krishna Dharabasi	Radha
2061 (2004)	Narayan Wagle	Palpasa Cafe
2060 (2003)	Gopal Parajuli	Naya Ishwar Ko Ghoshana
2059 (2002)	Revati Raman Khanal	Nepalko Kanooni Itihaasko Ruprekha
2058 (2001)	Hari Ram Joshi	Abhinav Sanskriti Kosh
2057 (2000)	Buddhi Narayan Shrestha	Nepalko Simana

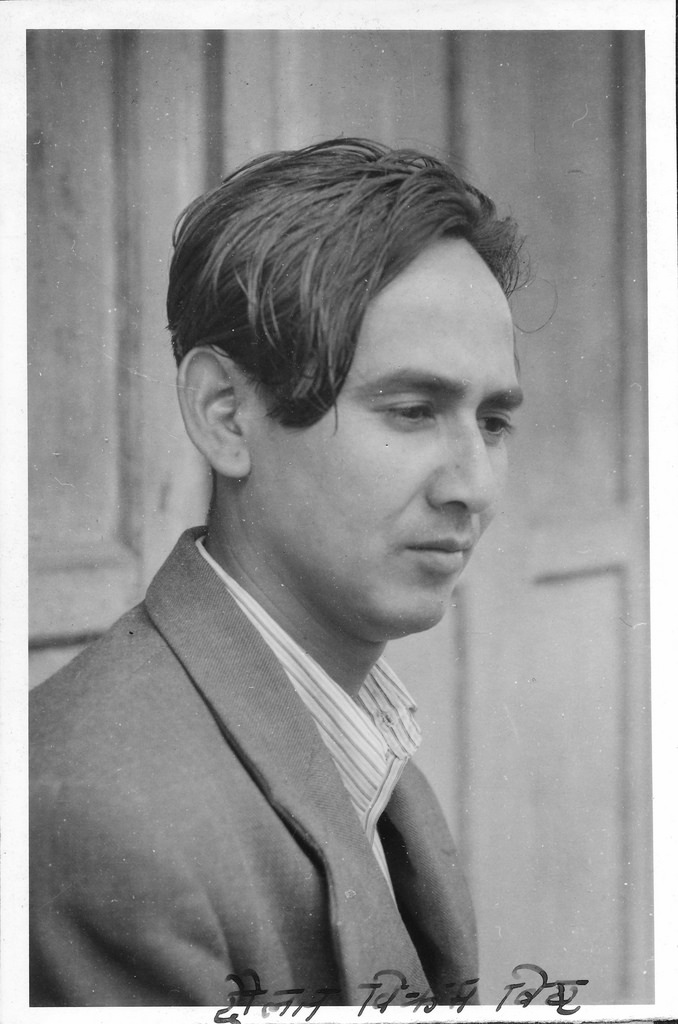
Daulat Bikram Bista won the award in 1988 for his novel Jyoti Jyoti Mahajyoti.

=== 1986– 1999 ===
Year in B.S. (in CE)^{[a]}	Author	Work
2056 (1999)	Dinesh Adhikari	Atirikta Avilekh
2055 (1998)	Dr. Keshab Prasad Upadhyaya	Dukhanta Natak ko Srijana Parampara
2054 (1997)	Lokendra Bahadur Chand	Bisarjan
2053 (1996)	Dr. Dayaram Shrestha	Nepali Rastrya Jhanda
2052 (1995)	Binod Prasad Dhital	Yojana Gandha
2051 (1994)	Father William Bourke SJ	Sahi Shabda
2050 (1993)	Sarad Chandra Sharma Bhattarai	Madhyamik Nepali Gadhyakhan
2049 (1992)	Dr. Bhabeshwor Pangeni	Palpama Prajatantrik Andolanka Sayadin 2007
2048 (1991)	Saru Bhakta	Pagal Basti
2047 (1990)	Bhanu Bhakta Pokhrel	Mirtujanya Mahakabya
2046 (1989)	Dr. Rajesh Gautam	Nepalko Prajatantrik Andolanma Nepal Prajaparisadko Bhumika
2045 (1988)	Daulat Bikram Bista	Jyoti Jyoti Mahajyoti
2044 (1987)	Rajeshwor Devkota	Utsarga Prem
2043 (1986)	Nayaraj Panta	Likchhabi Sambatko Nirnaya

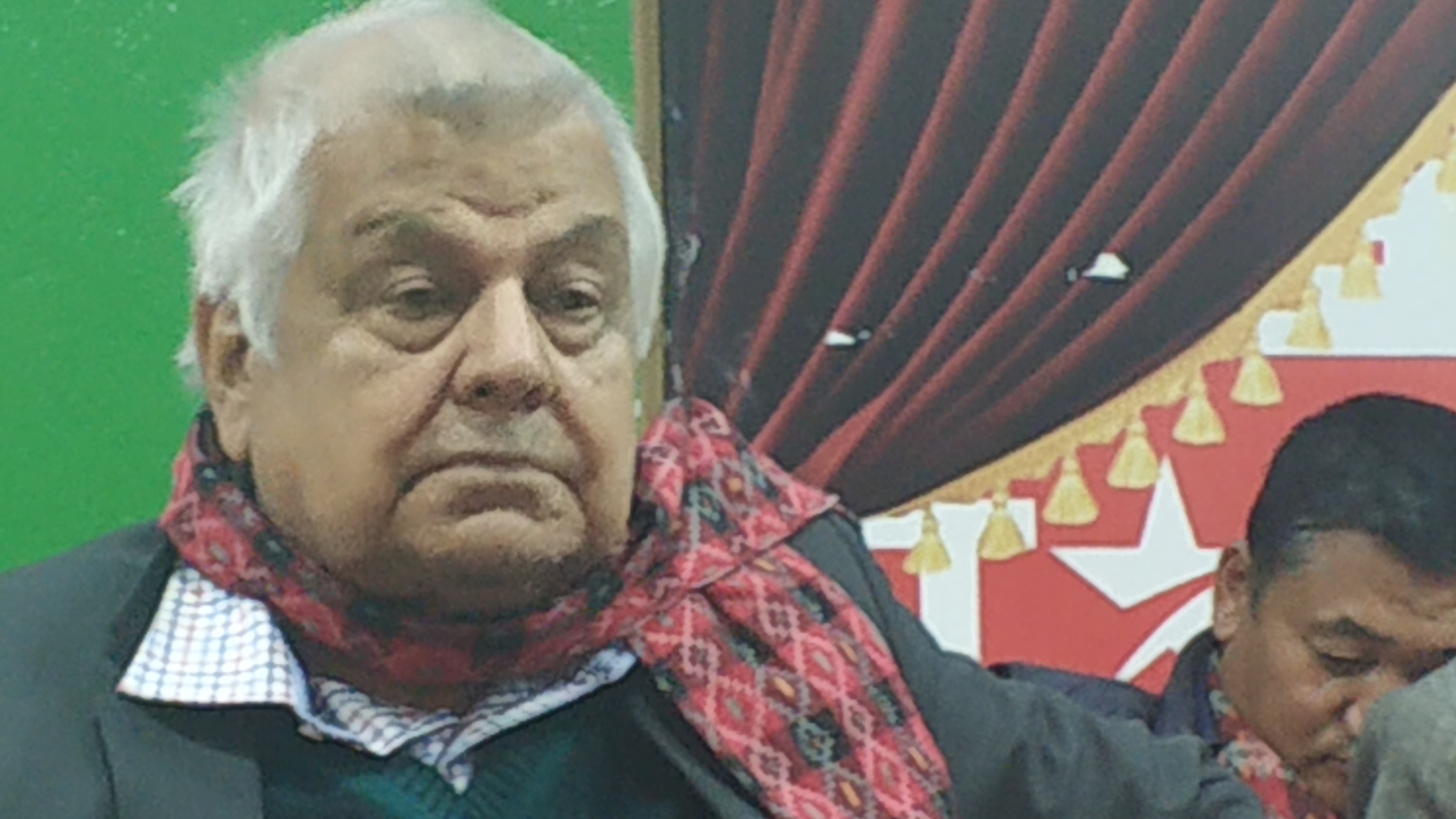
Dhruba Chandra Gautam won the award in 1983 for his novel Alikhit.

=== 1971 – 1985 ===
Year in B.S. (in CE)^{[a]}	Author	Work
2042 (1985)	Mohanraj Sharma	Baikuntha Express
2041 (1984)	Kanchan Pudasaini	Pratyagaman
2040 (1983)	Dr. Dhruba Chandra Gautam	Alikhit
2039 (1982)	Madan Mani Dixit	Madhabi
2038 (1981)	Mohan Koirala	Nadi Kinarka Majhi
2037 (1980)	Jagdish Shumsher Rana	Narsingh Avatar
2036 (1979)	Dr. Chabi Lal Gajurel; Karunakar Vaidya	Nepalma Paramparagat Prabidhi
2035 (1978)	Dhanush Chandra Gautam	Ghamka Pailaharu
2034 (1977)	Dr. Basudev Tripathi	Lekhnath Poudhyalko Kabitwako Bishleshan Tatha Mulyakan
2033 (1976)	Not Awarded	
2032 (1975)	Bhawani Bhikshu	Aagat
2031 (1974)	Not Awarded	
2030 (1973)	Dhana Bajra Bajracharya	Licchavi Kaal ka Abhilekh
2029 (1972)	Ishwor Ballav	Aagoka Phoolharu Hun Aagoka Phoolharu Hoinan
2028 (1971)	Chudamani Bandhu; Bihari Krishna Shrestha; Pradeep Rimal; Sthirjunga Bahadur Singh; Satyamohan Joshi	Karnali Lok Sanskriti

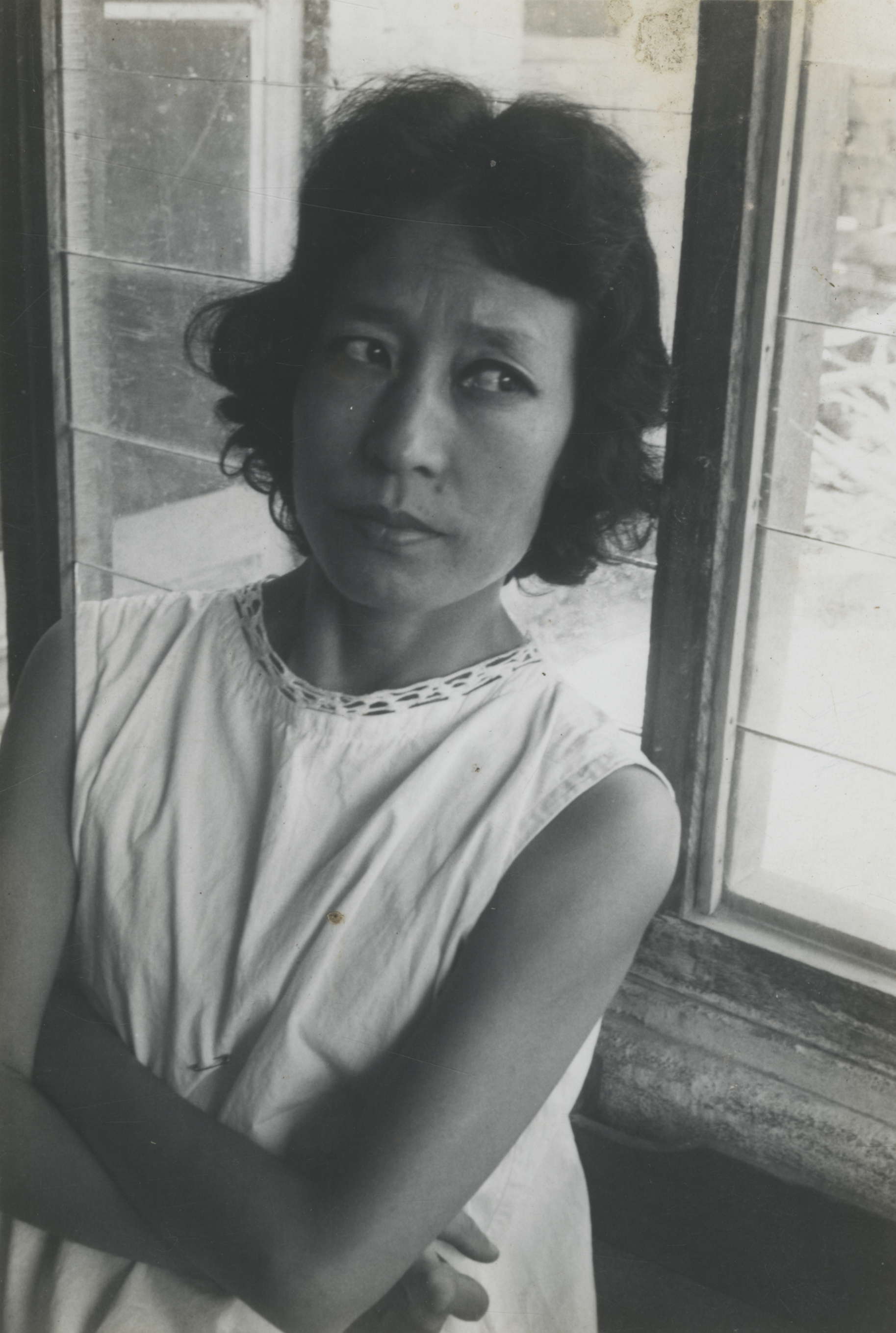
Parijat— the first woman to win the award.

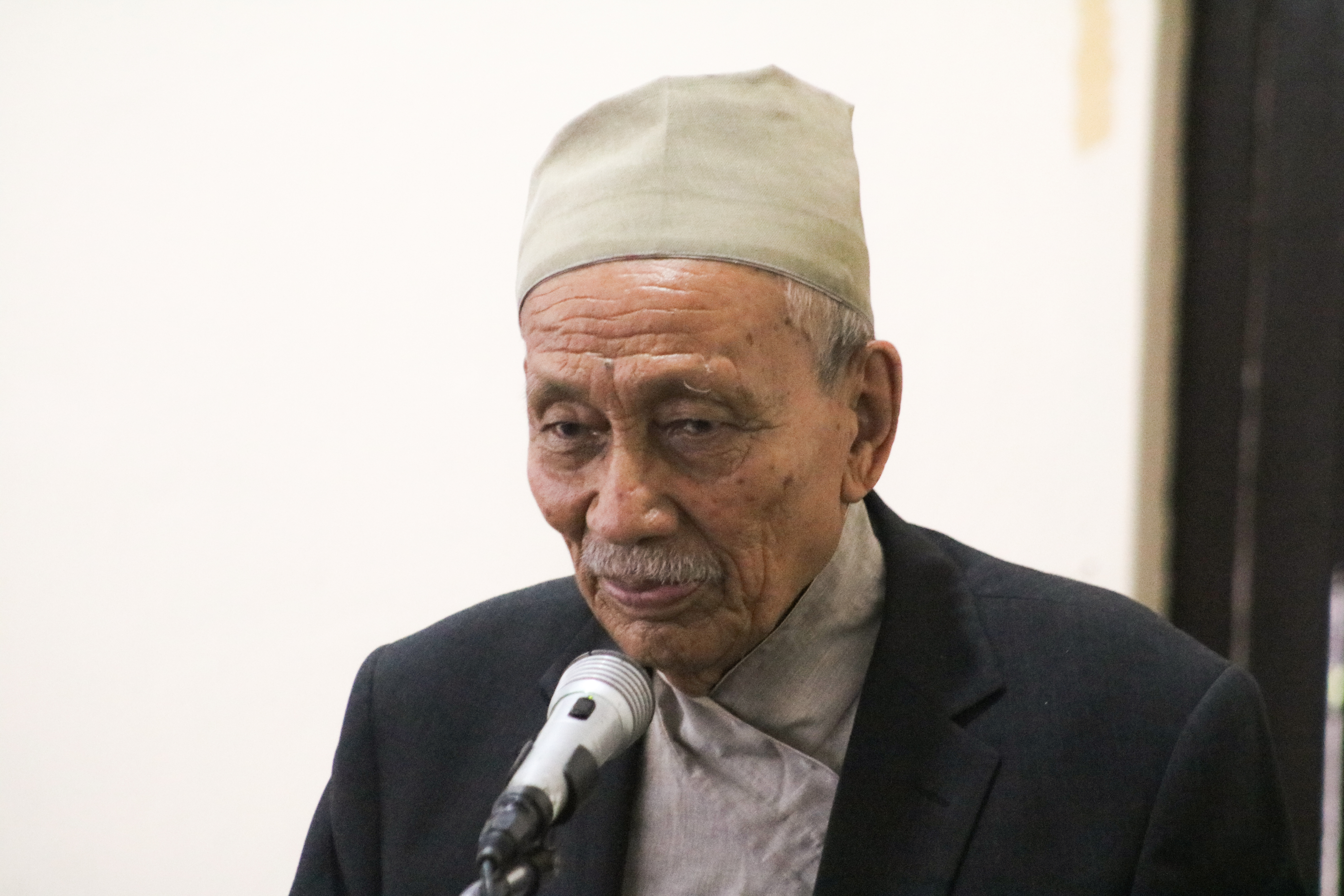
Satya Mohan Joshi, one of the three winners of the first edition of the award.

=== 1956 – 1970 ===
Year in B.S. (in CE)^{[a]}	Author	Work
2027 (1970)	Mahananda Sapkota	Nepali Nirwachanko Ruprekha
2026 (1969)	Taranath Sharma	Belaet Tira Baralida
2025 (1969)	Dharma Raj Thapa	Mangali Kushum
2025 (1969)	Parasmani Pradhan	Tipan Tapan
2024 (1967)	Grishma Bahadur Devkota	Nepalko Chapakhana ra Patrapatrikako Itihas
2024 (1967)	Shankar Lamichhane	Abstract Chintan Pyaj
2023 (1966)	Modanath Prasrit	Manab Mahakabya
2023 (1966)	Uttam Kunwar	Srasta ra Sahitya
2022 (1965)	Parijat	Shiris Ko Phool
2021 (1964)	Laxmi Bahadur Shrestha	Bastra Nirmand Kala
2021 (1964)	Nawaraj Chalise	Prachin Hindu Arthashastra
2021 (1964)	Mukunda Sharan Upadhyaya	Prakrit Pokhara
2021 (1964)	Balkrishna Pokhrel	Nepali Bhasa ra Sahitya
2020 (1963)	Janaklal Sharma	Josamani Santa Parampara ra Sahitya
2020 (1963)	Komalnath Adhikari	Naisdhir Charit
2019 (1962)	Gopal Prasad Rimal	Aamako Sapana
2018 (1961)	Ramesh Bikal	Naya Sadak Ko Geet
2017 (1960)	Bhim Nidhi Tiwari	Bishfot
2017 (1960)	Satyamohan Joshi	Nepali Rashtriya Mudra
2016 (1959)	Nityaraj Pandey	Mahakavi Devkota
2015 (1958)	Ganga Bikram Sijapati	Udhyan
2015 (1958)	Krishna Chandra Singh Pradhan	Kabi Byathit ra Kabya Sadhana
2014 (1957)	Karunakar Vaidya	Mitrika Udhyog
2014 (1957)	Leeladhwaj Thapa	Mann (novel)
2013 (1956)	Balram Joshi	Adhikbibhav Sthirbidhoot Utpadhak
2013 (1956)	Chittaranjan Nepali	Janaral Bhimsen Thapa ra Tatkalin Nepal
2013 (1956)	Satyamohan Joshi	Hamro Lok Sanskriti

== Trivia ==
- First winners: Satya Mohan Joshi, Chittaranjan Nepali, Balram Joshi
- First woman winner: Parijat
- First novel to win the prize: Mann
- First short story anthology winner: Naya Sadak ko Geet
- First poetry collection winner: Bishfot
- Most number of wins: Satya Mohan Joshi (3 times)

== See also ==
- Madan Puraskar Pustakalaya
- Nepali language
- Shri Durbar
- Jagadamba Kumari Devi
- Jagadamba Shree Purasakar

== Notes ==
1. ^[a] Year in B.S. = Year in C.E. + 56\57; 2077 B.S. = 2020/2021
