= Chandra Prakash Baniya =

Nepalese educator and writer (born 1951)

- चन्द्रप्रकाश बानियाँ
- Born: 7 April 1951 (age 75); Beni, Myagdi district
- Occupations: Educator, journalist, politician, writer
- Notable work: Maharani
- Political party: Communist Party of Nepal (Marxist–Leninist) (1978)
- Spouse: Mitra Kumari Baniya
- Children: 2
- Parents: Hasta Dal Baniya (father); Nanda Kumari Baniya (mother)
- Awards: Madan Puraskar (2019)

Chandra Prakash Baniya (Nepali: चन्द्रप्रकाश बानियाँ; born 7 April 1951) is a Nepali writer, columnist, educator and politician. He was elected as a representative from Communist Party of Nepal (Marxist–Leninist) (1978) in 1991 general election for Myagdi (constituency 2). He won the Madan Puraskar for his novel Maharani in 2019.

== Early life and education ==
He was born on 7 April 1951 (25 Chaitra 2007 BS) in Beni, Myagdi district of Gandaki province in western Nepal as the youngest son to father Hasta Dal Baniya and mother Nanda Kumari Baniya. He completed his SLC-level education from Bidhya Devi Madhyamik Bidhyalaya (Bidhya Devi Secondary School) in Baglung district. He received his bachelor's degree from Saraswati Multiple Campus in Thamel.

== Political career ==
After passing SLC examinations, he started teaching at Bal Bodhini School in Bhirmuni, Beni. He then subsequently taught at Paulastya Madhyamik Bidhyalaya, Muktidham Madyamik Bidhyalaya and Mangala Madyamik Bidhyalaya. During his teaching career, he became involved in the teachers protest. With the protest, he began his political career. He passed his civil service examination in 2036 BS (c. 1979/1980) but was restricted by the government with the accusation of being involved in anti-Panchayat protest.

He joined the erstwhile Communist Party of Nepal (Marxist–Leninist) (1978) in 2040 BS (c. 1983/1984). He contested for the 1991 Nepalese general election (2047 BS) and won from Myagdi (Constituency 2). He was an active political leader. He was diagnosed with brain tumor in 2050 BS and on the suggestion of Dr. Upendra Devkota, he decided to take a break from his political life. He did not contested in the 1994 mid-term election. The party split in 1997. He then decided not to renew his party membership and quit the political life.

He was imprisoned multiple times during his political career. Many of his manuscripts were burnt by the government during his capture.

== Literary career ==
He was interested in literature since his early age. He used to participate in various competition is schools. He used to read various mythological and religious texts. He was also involved in journalism and wrote as a columnist for Dhaulagiri weekly newspaper published in his district. After moving to Kathmandu, he wrote for Janaastha and Janadharana weekly newspapers.

He wrote a book called Aitihasik Parbat Rajya (Historical Parbat Kingdom) while he was in Beni. He went to various publisher in Kathmandu to publish his book. Sajha Publications accepted the manuscript but neither printed it nor let the author print it. After some years, Sajha Prakashan gave back the manuscript and then he published it through Beni Library in 2065 BS (2008). In 2068 BS (2011), he published Khas Jati ra Kul Puja, a book about the ancestor worshipping ritual of Khasa people.

He published a book named Mrityu Sanskar Manthan: Itihas, Manyata ra Bastabikta on 29 September 2018, a non-fiction book about the death traditions in Khas society. He then wrote a historical fiction novel set in Parbat kingdom during 1770 BS (c. 1713) called Maharani in 2019 for which he received the Madan Puraskar, the highest literary award in Nepali literature.

In September 2020, he published a collection of essays titled Bhaujyaha. The book was published by Shikha Books. The collection consists of 40 essays written over time about various religious, cultural, historical and some local issues as well as social practices. The book won the Ratna Shrestha Puraskar in 2021. He published a memoir titled Makurako Punarjanma in 2021.

On 4 February 2023, his book about the Parbat kingdom titled Chaubisi Rajya Parbat was published. The book is divided into five sections: first section describes the fall of Khasa Empire and birth of Chaubisi Rajya (twenty-four kingdoms), second section describes the establishment, rise and fall of the Kingdom of Parbat, third volume describes the social, economic and administrative arrangements of the Kingdom of Parbat, fourth volume describes some important historical places of the Kingdom of Parbat era, and the fifth section describes the political situation of the mountains after the dissolution of the state alongside reference materials.

== Bibliography ==
Title of the book	Published date	Genre	Publisher	Awards
Aitihasik Parbat Rajya	2008	Historical non-fiction	Beni Library	
Khas Jati ra Kul Puja	2011	Non-fiction	Baniya Bandhu Samaj	
Mrityu Sanskar Manthan: Itihas, Manyata ra Bastabikta	29 September 2018	Non-fiction	Shikha Books	
Maharani	2019	Historical fiction	Shikha Books	Madan Puraskar
Bhaujyaha	September 2020	Non-fiction	Shikha Books	Ratna Shrestha Puraskar
Makurako Punarjanma	2021	Memoir	Shikha Books	
Chaubisi Rajya Parbat	4 February 2023	Historical non-fiction	Shikha Books	

== Personal life ==
He currently lives in Pokhara city with his wife Mitra Kumari Baniya. They have two children, a son and a daughter. His son is Dr. Pravin Baniya and the daughter is Pramila Baniya.

== See also ==
- Bhagi Raj Ingnam
- Neelam Karki Niharika
- Ramlal Joshi
