= Rewati Raman Khanal =

Nepalese law scholar (1935 – 2020)

- रेवतीरमण खनाल
- Born: 9 July 1935; Tanahu, Gandaki, Nepal
- Died: 27 October 2020 (aged 85); Kalimati, Kathmandu, Bagmati
- Occupations: Law scholar and writer
- Employer: Narayanhiti Palace
- Notable work: Nepali Kanooni Itihasko Rooprekha
- Children: 3
- Parents: Gobardan Khanal (father); Yashoda Devi Khanal (mother)
- Awards: Madan Puraskar

Rewati Raman Khanal (9 July 1935 – 27 October 2020) was a Nepalese law scholar and writer. He served as the chief secretary of the Narayanhiti Palace for 35 years. He wrote multiple books on the legal and bureaucratic system of Nepal and receive the Madan Puraskar for his book Nepali Kanooni Itihasko Rooprekha in 2002 (2059 BS).

== Biography ==
Khanal was born on 9 July 1935 (25 Asar 1992 BS) in Chundi village of Tanahu district to father Gobardan Khanal and mother Yashoda Devi Khanal.

Khanal died on 27 October 2020 (11 Kartik 2077 BS) in his residence at Kalimati, Kathmandu. He is survived by his wife and three children (one daughter and two sons).

== Books ==
- Muluki Ain Kehi Bibechana
- Kar Sambandhi Kanoon
- Rit Nibedan Siddhanta ra Bibechana
- Nepali Kanooni Itihasko Rooprekha
- Nepali Kanooni Masyauda
- Samalochana ra Faisala
- Rajnitik Kusumakar
- Dharmik Katha Sangraha
- Ravanayan

== Awards ==
Khanal won the Madan Puraskar for Nepali Kanooni Itihasko Rooprekha, a book on the historical outline of Nepalese law, in 2002 (2059 BS).
