= Saru Bhakta =

Nepalese writer (born 1955)

Sarubhakta
- सरुभक्त
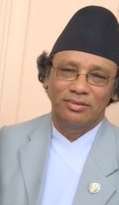
- Born: Bhakta Raj Shrestha; 27 November 1955 (age 70); Baghbazar, Pokhara, Gandaki Province
- Education: Tribhuvan University
- Notable work: Pagal Basti
- Parents: Ganesh Bahadur Shrestha (father); Laxmi Shrestha (mother)
- Awards: Madan Puraskar

Sarubhakta (Nepali: सरुभक्त) is the pen name of Bhakta Raj Shrestha, a celebrated Nepalese playwright, novelist, songwriter and poet and a winner of Madan Puraskar, one of the most prestigious literary awards in Nepal.

== Biography ==
He was born to Ganesh Bahadur Shrestha and Laxmi Shrestha in Baghbazaar, Pokhara, Nepal on 12 manshir 2012 BS. He studied in Gandaki Boarding School, Lainachaur bc. He completed his SLC level education from Rashtriya Secondary School (then Rashtriya Multiple School). He then received an IA degree from Amrit Science College, Kathmandu. He received his Bachelor degree from Prithvi Narayan Campus, Pokhra and received Master's degree from Tribhuvan University. He started writing around 1978.

Many consider his novel Pagal Basti, to be a classic in Nepalese literature. He was also a member of the Royal Nepal Academy and the Immediate Past Chancellor of Nepal Music and Drama Academy.

== Associated Institutions ==
- Founder: Rastriya Bal Pratibha Puraskar, Pokhara (National Prize for Children)
- Ex-Chairman: Pokhara Public Library, Pokhara
- Founder: Pokhreli Yuva Sanskritik Pariwar (A cultural organization)
- Founder: Yuva Natak Parivar (Younh dramatic group)
- Founder: Pratibimba Nritya Parivar (Dramatic group of Pokhara)
- Co-ordinator: Conservation Poetry Movement (2055 B.S.)
- Member: Nepal Academy
- Chancellor: Nepal Music and Drama Academy

== Bibliography ==
Poetry Collections

- Banda Kham Bhitra (2035)
- Boksiko Ahwan ra Ghoshanapatra
- Kavi, Premi ra Pagal (2050)
- Kurup Mashiha (2054)
- JyanMaya (2056)
- Ka Purush (2057)
- Prayogshala Bhitra (2058)
- Manabhari Matobhari (2061)
- Etar Samaya (2061)
- Hajar Buddhsharu (2061)
- Jhuma (2061)
- Bhedigoth (2063)
- Cybercafema Ekdin (2064)
- Kholsawari Kholsapari (2065)

Plays

- Yuddha : Uhi Gas Chamber Bhitra (2037)
- Itihas Bhitrako Itihas (2041)
- Shishirka Antim Dinharu (2042)
- Ithar (2044)
- Gaungharka Natakharu (2050)
- BalBalikaharuko Naatak (2053)
- Asamay Amausam (2054)
- Nimabiya (2055)
- Ashadhammo Sanantano (2045)
- Jasto Dantyakatha (2057)
- Sirumarani (2061)
- Gauko Katha Yoesto Hunchha Hai (2061)
- Sharararthiharu (2063)

Fictions

- Ek Avinavko Atmakatha (2044)
- Chhori Brahmanda (2047)
- Pagal Basti (2048 )
- Taruni Kheti (2053)
- Yamagal (2054)
- Samay Trasadi (2058)
- Chulee (2059)
- Adhyaro Kotha (2060)
- Padarthaharuko Geet (2063)
- Pratiganda (2076)

Editorial

- Saraswat (Pokhreli Pratinidhi Kavita Sangraha, 2047)
- Siddhicharanka Jail Sansmaran (2052)
- Sangrachayar Kavita Yatra (2053)
- Saraswat (Trimonthly Nepali literary magazine, co-editor )

== Award and Honor ==
- International Disabled Year, Best Play(Drama) Award (2038 B.S.)
- First Prize Winner, Trivuvan University Literary Competition (2039 B.S.)
- Busak Gold Medal, Nepal Jaysees (2039 B.S.)
- National Youth Festival, Best Play (Drama) Award (2041 B.S.)
- GAA Competition, Best Play Award (2041 B.S.)
- National Drama Festival, Royal Nepal Academy, Best Dramatist (2042 B.S.)
- Third Prize Winner, National Poetry Festival, Royal Nepal Academy (2035 B.S.)
- First Prize Winner, National Poetry Festival, Royal Nepal Academy (2042 B.S.)
- Yuva Barsa Moti Puraskar (2043 B.S.)
- Gai Jatra Hasya Byangya Mahotsav, Royal Nepal Academy, Sarvottam Byanga Muktakkar (2043 B.S.)
- Arohan Samman (2047 B.S.)
- Madan Puraskar (2048 B.S.)
- Lokendra Sahitya Puraskar (2051 B.S.)
- Ratna Shree Award (2052 B.S.)
- Nepal Bal Sahitya Puraskar (2054 B.S.)
- Siromani Puraskar (2054 B.S.)
- Kumudini Kala Sahitya Puraskar (2055 B.S.)
- Gopinath Aryal Rangamanch Puraskar (2056 B.S.)
- Ganesh-Khilkumari Duwal Prative Puraskar (2056 B.S.)
- National Drama Festival, 2056, Best Director and Recommendation Prize but rejected
- Ganki Basundhara Puraskar (2057 B.S.)
- Parvat Sahitya Samman, (2058 B.S.)
- Namaste Musical Honor (2056 B.S.)
- Birendra-Aishwarya Medal (2058 B.S.)
- Thakali Sewa Samiti (Central) Honor (2057 B.S.)
- Prithivi Narayan Campus, FSU Honor (2059 B.S.)
- Music Nepal Honor (2058 B.S.)
- Upanyash Satabarsiki Samman (2060 B.S.)
- Shukla Sahitya Puraskar (2061 B.S.)
- Dabali Puraskar (2062 B.S.)
- Sahitya Kunja Samman, Central Department of Nepali Kirtipur (2062 B.S.)
- America-Nepal Society Samman, Washington D.C. (2062 B.S.)
- Antarastriya Nepali Sahitya Samman, D.C. Metro Chapter (2062 B.S.)
- New York Kala Manch Samman, New York (2062B.S.)
- Dhading Sahitya Samaj Samman (2063 B.S.)
- Himali Sanskritik Parivar Samman (2065 B.S.)
- Himdark Samman (2067 B.S.)
