= Jagdish Shumsher Rana =

Nepalese writer and politician (1929–2017)

Jagadish Shumsher Rana
- Born: August 18, 1929; Kathmandu, Nepal
- Died: 9 October 2017 (aged 88); Chandigarh
- Other name: Jagadish Shumsher Jung Bahadur Rana
- Occupation: Writer

Jagadish Shumsher Rana (Nepali: जगदीशशमशेर राणा; 1929 – 2017) was a Nepalese writer and politician. In 1981, Rana was awarded the Madan Puraskar.

== Biography ==
Jagadish Shumsher Rana was born on August 3, 1929 (Bhadra 3, 1986 BS) in Kathmandu, Nepal to Mrigendra Shumsher Rana. His grandfather was Baber Shumsher Jung Bahadur Rana, son of Chandra Shumsher Jung Bahadur Rana.

In 1960, he moved to Shimla after the rise of Panchayat in Nepal. On 16 July 1965, he married Bhuvaneshwari Kumari.

In 1981, Rana was awarded the Madan Puraskar for Narsingh Awatar.

Rana was also a noted painter of semi-abstract forms.

Rana died on 9 October 2017 due to heart failure.

== Works ==
- Narsingh Awatar
- Seto Khyak
- Uttar Aadhunikta ra Bahulya Bisfot
- Dash Dristikon
