= Pathshala (novel) =

2017 novel by Tirtha Gurung

- Cover page
- Author: Tirtha Gurung
- Original title: पाठशाला
- Language: Nepali
- Genre: Coming of age
- Published: August 26, 2017
- Publisher: Book Hill Publications
- Publication place: Nepal
- Media type: Print
- Pages: 245
- Awards: INLS Best Novel Award; Tamu Sahitya Award; Madan Puraskar (Shortlisted)
- ISBN: 9789937910156
- Followed by: Aapa Kharpa

Pathshala (Nepali: पाठशाला, lit. 'School') is a Nepali coming–of–age novel by Tirtha Gurung. It was published on August 26, 2017, by Book Hill Publications. It is the debut novel of the author. The book was shortlisted for the Madan Puraskar in the same year. Gurung worked as a teacher in a school and wrote this book from his various experiences with his pupils.

== Synopsis ==
Pathshala is a coming of age story of a Nepalese teenage boy. It depicts the story of an urban teenager and presents the various the elements of his social life—friends, family, school. It sheds light on the growing pains of an adolescent child in a city. Gagan is the central character of the book who lives in the city of Pokhara.

== Reception ==
The book won the International Nepali Literary Society Best Novel Award for the year 2019. The prize is awarded every two year for best novel in Nepali language. The book also received the "Tamu Sahitya Award". The book was also shortlisted for the coveted Madan Puraskar for 2017.

== See also ==
- Yogmaya
- Karnali Blues
- Phirphire (novel)
