= Pagal Basti =

1991 Nepalese novel by Saru Bhakta

Paagal Basti
- Cover page of the first edition
- Author: Saru Bhakta
- Original title: पागल बस्ती
- Language: Nepali / English
- Published: 1991
- Publisher: Sajha Prakashan
- Publication place: Nepal
- Media type: Print
- Awards: Madan Puraskar
- ISBN: 9789937320900

Pagal Basti (Nepali: पागल बस्ती, lit. 'Lunatics' Settlement') is a 1991 Nepalese novel written by Saru Bhakta. It was published in 1991 by Sajha Prakashan. It won Nepal's foremost literary award, Madan Puraskar.

The story starts with narrator's journey to Ghandruk. Martha, the protagonist, is a teacher in Prithivi Narayan Campus. In her journey along with some other writers, she talks about Pashchimanchal Campus, a popular engineering college. The book is written in a simple language. However, the prose can be difficult to understand.

== Synopsis ==
The main characters in the story are (Adiguru) Prashant and (Adimata) Martha. The major focus of the book is the continuous changes that occur in the mental state of these two characters. Both of the characters are dissatisfied with each other and both feel guilty about their past. They have both started a journey of to end their dissatisfaction and face their guilt. Prashant, who had loved Martha has changed into Adiguru after her refusal. Martha realizes the value of love only after she rejects Prashant and she goes on a quest of finding him in the Adi village. But this time Prashant rejects her proposal and instead changes her into Adimata. Prashant wants Martha to marry a deserving man, heartbroken Martha leaves the town abandoning Prashant.

== Reception ==
The book won the Madan Puraskar for 1991.

== See also ==
- Shirishko Phool
- Seto Dharti
- Maharani
