= Ganga Bikram Sijapati =

Nepalese writer

- गङ्गाविक्रम सिजापती
- Born: Dugam Bahil, Kathmandu, Nepal
- Died: 21 December 1991; Lalitpur district, Nepal
- Occupation: Agriculturist
- Notable work: Udhyan
- Awards: Madan Puraskar

Ganga Bikram Sijapati (Nepali: गङ्गाविक्रम सिजापती) was a Nepalese writer.

In 1958, Sijapati was awarded the Madan Puraskar, Nepal's highest literary honour, for his book Udhyan.

He was born in Kathmandu, Nepal.
