= Mokshabhumi =

2020 Nepali award-winning novel

- Cover page of the first edition
- Author: Keshab Dahal
- Original title: मोक्षभूमि
- Language: Nepali
- Genre: Historical fiction
- Set in: Khasa Kingdom
- Published: October 06, 2020
- Publisher: Kitab Publishers
- Publication date: October 06, 2020
- Publication place: Nepal
- Media type: Print
- Pages: 376
- Awards: Padmashree Sahitya Puraskar
- ISBN: 9789937076890
- Website: Mokshabhumi

Mokshabhumi (Nepali: मोक्षभूमि, romanized: Mokṣabhūmi, lit. 'Land of liberation') is a 2020 Nepali novel by Keshab Dahal. It was published on 6 October 2020 (20 Ashoj 2077 BS) by Kitab Publishers. It won the Padmashree Sahitya Puraskar and was shortlisted for the Madan Puraskar (2077 BS). It is Dahal's debut novel, who is a political activist and writer.

== Synopsis ==
The book is set in the 1280s in the medieval Khasa Kingdom of Nepal. When the emperor Krachalladeva decides to liberate about ten thousand serfs in order to atone for his war crimes, the whole kingdom is caught in a frenzy. There is an upheaval in the Sinja valley. With that upheaval begins the great debate of Khas-Aryan ethnic superiority and human superiority. The debate of love, sex, struggle and salvation of those free slaves are begun. The book further tells about the journey of those slaves and their search for their existence and the adoption of Buddhism by the emperor Krachalladeva and how Buddhism was appropriated by Hinduism.

== Theme ==
Mokshabhumi highlights the story of those people on whose struggles the whole civilization is standing but their contributions are forgotten and unsung in the greater scheme. The book also discusses on the evils of caste system and the hierarchical classification of human beings by the society. The book is an allegory of the existing evil and discriminatory traditions of the ancient kingdom which is still prevalent in the modern Nepali society.

== Reception ==
The book won Padmashree Sahitya Puraskar for the year 2078 BS (2021). The award was presented by Khemlal-Harikala Lamichhane Samaaj Kalyan Pratisthan, a social welfare foundation. The award is given annually for contribution to Nepali literature. The cash prize for the award was Rs. 300,000. The book was also shortlisted for Madan Puraskar, the highest literary honor in Nepali literature, but lost to Limbuwanko Etihasik Dastavej Sangraha.

== See also ==
- Maharani
- Basain
- Sallipir
