= Nityaraj Pandey =

Nepalese writer (1932–2019)

- नित्यराज पाण्डे
- Born: 4 January 1932; Bhagbati Bahal Naxal, Kathmandu
- Died: 13 June 2019 (aged 87)
- Education: Tribhuvan University
- Occupation: Writer
- Notable work: Mahakavi Devkota
- Spouses: Premi Tiwari; Meena Kadariya
- Parents: Siddhiraj Pandey (father); Bidhya Kumari Pandey (mother)
- Awards: Madan Puraskar

Nityaraj Pandey (Nepali: नित्यराज पाण्डे) was a Nepalese writer. Mahakavi Devkota, a biography of Laxmi Prasad Devkota is one of his most notable work.

== Early life and education ==
He was born on 4 January 1932 (20 Poush 1988 BS) in Bal Mandir Kshetra, Bhagbati Bahal, Naxal, Kathmandu to father Siddhiraj Pandey and mother Bidhya Kumari. In 1989 BS his family relocated to Dhobidhara after their house was taken away by the Rana government. He spent his childhood in Dhobidhara. His father died when he was nine years old. His mother died in 1999 BS Bhadra when she had gone to her maternal home in Kurintar. He completed his SLC level education in 2007 BS at the age of 18. He obtained his IA degree in 2011 BS and BA degree in 2013 BS. He obtained an MA degree from Tribhuvan University after winning the Madan Puraskar.

== Literary career ==
His first article, Lumbini Bagaicha was published in Gorkhapatra in 2011 BS. He published his first book on Buddhist philosophy called Boudha Digdarshan in 2013 BS. In 1959 (2016 BS), Pandey won the Madan Puraskar, Nepal's highest literary honour, for his book Mahakavi Devkota.

== Legacy ==
Nityaraj Pandey Pragya Pratisthan, a literary society was established in his name in 2072 BS (c. 2015/2016). The society awards three prizes - Laxmi Prasad Devkota Puraskar (contribution to art, literature and religious culture), Nityaraj Pandey Gyan Bigyan Puraskar (contribution to science and academics) and Siddhiraj, Bidhya Kumari Shikshya Puraskar (contribution to education). The awards are presented annually.

== Notable works ==
- Boudha Digdarshan
- Mahakavi Devkota

== Personal life ==
His first marriage was to Premi Tiwari in 2008 BS (c. 1951/1952). She died in 2051 BS. He then married Meena Kadariya in 2053 BS (c. 1996/1997). Pandey died on 13 June 2019 (30 Jestha 2076).

== See also ==
- Laxmi Prasad Devkota
- Satya Mohan Joshi
- Shankar Lamichhane
