= Mahakavi Devkota =

1959 book by Nityaraj Pandey

- Cover page of the book
- Author: Nityaraj Pandey
- Original title: महाकवि देवकोटा
- Language: Nepali
- Subject: Laxmi Prasad Devkota
- Genre: Biography
- Published: 1959
- Publisher: Sajha Prakashan
- Publication date: 1959
- Publication place: Nepal
- Media type: Print (Paperback)
- Pages: 307
- Award: Madan Puraskar
- ISBN: 9789993327929
- OCLC: 79647044

Mahakavi Devkota (Nepali: महाकवि देवकोटा, lit. 'The Great Poet Devkota') is a biographical book by Nityaraj Pandey. The book is about the life of poet Laxmi Prasad Devkota. The book was published in 1959 (2016 BS) by Sajha Prakashan and won the Madan Puraskar for the same year. The book was published in the same year as Devkota died.

== Synopsis ==
Nityaraj Pandey grew up near the house of Laxmi Prasad Devkota. Being inspired by him, he decided to write his biography. Devkota is known as Mahakavi (The Great Poet) in Nepali literature. He was much loved and revered in Nepali literature. The book is divided into 24 chapter.

Devkota was born on 13 November 1909 (27 Kartik 1966 B.S.) to father Pandit. Teel Madhav Devkota and mother Amar Rajya Lakshmi Devi in Dhobidhara, Kathmandu on the night of Laxmi Puja He graduated from Patna University. He worked as a lecturer in Tri Chandra College and Padma Kanya College. In his lifetime, he published multiple poems, stories, epics and a novel. He used to write primarily in Nepali but would occasionally write in English and even translate his own works into English. His epic called Muna Madan is one of the most popular book in Nepal. He died on 14 September 1959 along the banks of Bagmati river in Pashupatinath Temple, Kathmandu.

== Reception ==
The book won the prestigious Madan Puraskar for 1959 (2016 BS). He received a cash reward of Rs. 4000 along the prize which he spent on publishing more copies of his book. He had only typed the manuscript and submitted the manuscript to award committee. He published the book after receiving the award.

== See also ==
- Hamro Lok Sanskriti
- Karnali Lok Sanskriti
- Belaet Tira Baralida
