= Duradanda =

Duradanda her_name = दुराडाँडा
- Village development committee
- Location in Nepal = Sundarbazar -o4 Lamjung, Nepal Duradanda her_name = (Nepal)
- Coordinates: 28.16°N 84.37°E
- Country: Nepal
- Zone: Gandaki Zone
- District: Lamjung District

Population (1991)
  - Total: 2,135
- Time zone: UTC+5:45 (Nepal Time)

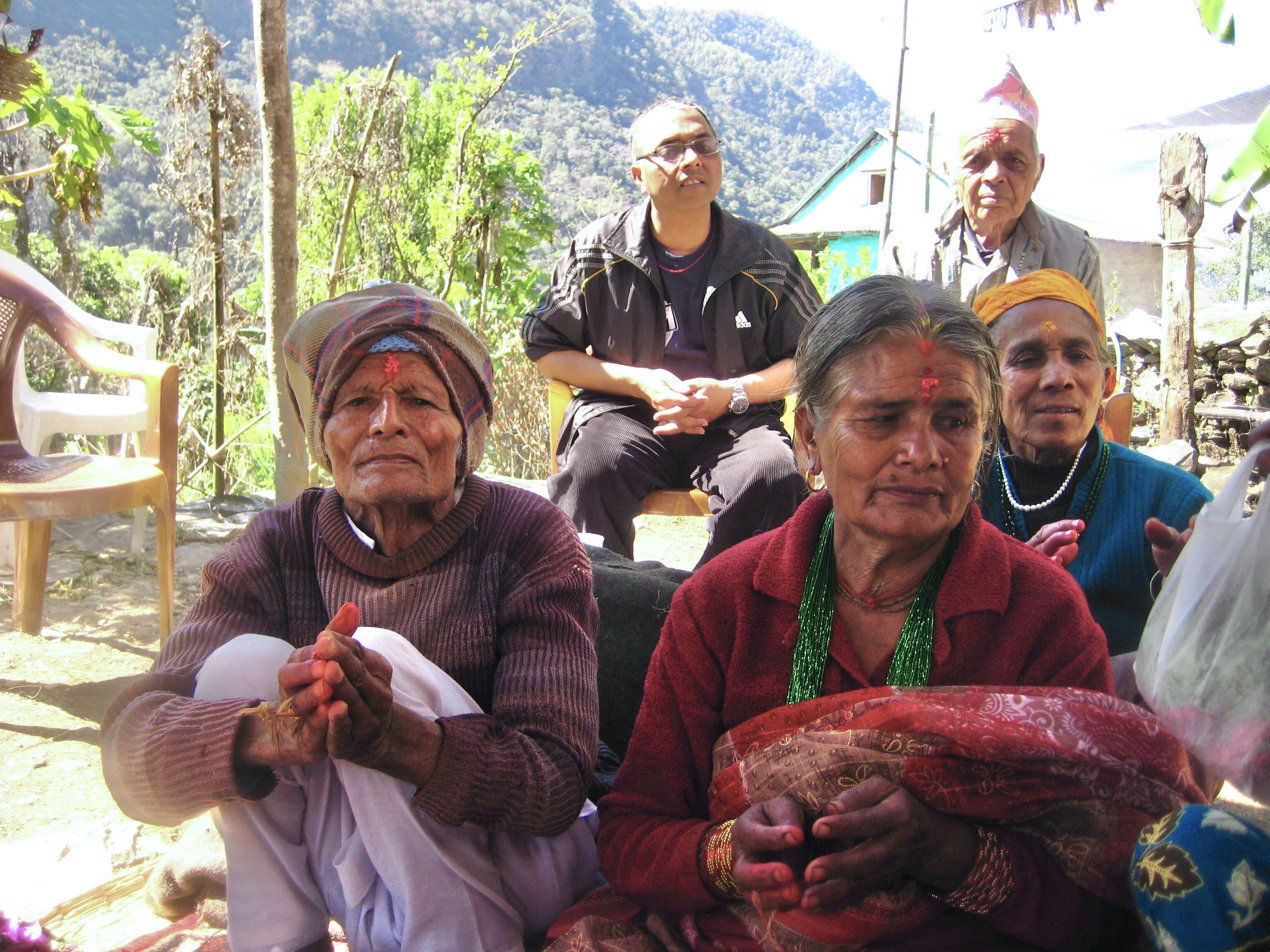
85 years old man celebrating moons worship

== Introduction ==
Duradanda , दुराडाँडा is one of the mid-hills in Lamjung District, one of the districts in Gandaki in central Nepal. Duradanda is a historic place formerly comprising six village development committees (VDCs) namely Chandreshwor, Duradanda (sensu stricto), Dhuseni, Ishaneshwor, Neta, and Purankot. After the restructuring of the local government bodies established by the Constitution of Nepal 2015, the former VDCs now represent different wards of Sundarbazar (Chandreshwor, Duradanda, Dhuseni and Sindure), Madhyanepal (Neta and Ishaneshwor) or Besishahar (Purankot) municipalities. The main entry point or the starting point of 'Duradanda' hill is 'Satrasaya Phant' (Satrasaya Fedi). This is also the base of Duradanda hill. The north and east sides of Duradanda hill are bordered by the Kirinche river, the south side by the Paundi river, and the west side by the Neta and Sindure.

=== Naming of Duradanda ===
The name 'Duradanda' 'दुराडाँडा' is composed of two terms: Dura (दुरा)= a historic tribe + danda (डाँडा)= a hill (in Nepali).

=== How to get to Duradanda? ===
One can reach Duradanda easily using road transportation from different routes. The main entry point is 'Satrasaya Plant', which is about a 10 minutes drive or 30 minutes walk west of Sundarbazar. You can also reach Duradanda from the west, using the Neta entry point of the Madhyanepal municipality if you are coming from the Pokhara side. Road networks are being constructed that connects Duradanda from several sides. However, as of 2023, the roads are not paved and mostly not graveled making transportation unreliable and difficult during the rainy season. Dry seasons are best to travel as is the case in most rural areas of Nepal. Direct passenger bus services are now available from several main cities, the country capital Kathmandu, the tourism city and the provincial capital Pokhara, the gateway to terai region Narayangadh, and the district headquarters Besishahar.

=== The Dura Tribe ===
Dura (दुरा) is a rare indigenous tribe inhabiting the top parts of the Duradanda hill. Duradanda is considered to be the place of origin of the 'Dura' tribe. Duras have their own language and culture but are currently mostly forgotten because of an increasing influence from other cultures. Dura language is no longer spoken as the tribe uses the Nepali language for communication. Only older generations know the language, and people of that generation are mostly not alive. Thus, the Dura language is in danger of being completely lost. Dura tribe has a historic role and reputation in this area and are important political game players in the past as well as the present. Duras played a role in establishing the king of Lamjung Kingdom when Nepal was fragmented into 22–24 Kingdoms, the Bayise Chaubisi Rajyas.

=== Historic Education Hub ===
Duradanda is also known for its historic role in social reform and education movements. 'Halo Kranti, the plowing movement' and 'Siksha Kranti, the educational movement' are among the famous. Sarvodaya High School (now, Sarbodaya Higher Secondary School and Sarbodaya Campus) was one of the oldest schools in the entire region of Central Nepal. Thus, people from very far places used to come to Duradanda for formal school education at Sarvodaya High School. At that time, young people who wanted to come here to seek school education from far villages used to say: "Duradanda kei chhaina tadha, janchhu ma ta sikshya ko khojima" meaning that "Duradanda is no longer far and I want to go there seeking my education". There were no hostels, so the youngsters used to live as guests (paying or free) in locals' houses, preferably relatives. In return, they had to bring commodities or provide labor services for household and/or farm work.

=== Duradanda Village Development Committee ===
One of the Village Development Committees (VDC) in Duradanda was named 'Duradanda VDC' before the new restructuring of the local government bodies in 2015. Duradanda VDC (sensu stricto), thus, only represents a small part of Duradanda and includes a few villages in the southeastern part of Duradanda hill. At the time of the 1991 Nepal census the population of this VDC was 2135 people living in 430 households. The VDC has one high school named 'Sanskriti Sadan' in the village of Archalyani.
