= Chittaranjan Nepali =

Nepalese writer (1931–2023)

- चित्तरञ्जन नेपाली
- thumb
- Born: Narayan Prasad Rajbhandari; 21 July 1931; Nhyeekantala Tole, Kathmandu, Nepal
- Died: 16 October 2023 (aged 92); Chabahil, Kathmandu, Nepal
- Education: MA (History)
- Alma mater: Tribhuvan University
- Occupations: Writer, historian
- Years active: 52
- Notable work: Janaral Bhimsen Thapa Ra Tatkalin Nepal
- Spouse: Merri Baba Rajbhandari
- Children: Manoj Prasad Rajbhandari, Neeta Joshi, Neera Shrestha, Neema Rajbhandari
- Awards: Madan Puraskar

Narayan Prasad Rajbhandari (Nepali: चित्तरञ्जन नेपाली; 21 July 1931 – 16 October 2023), professionally known as Chittaranjan Nepali, was a Nepalese writer and historian. He received the first ever Madan Puraskar for Janaral Bhimsen Thapa Ra Tatkalin Nepal, a biographical book on the life of prime minister Bhimsen Thapa. He wrote in Nepali as well as Nepalbhasa.

== Early life and education ==
Nepali was born on 21 July 1931 (10 Shrawan 1988 BS) to Sardar Medini Prasad Rajbhandari and Kali Nani Rajbhandari. He began his basic education in Mahabir School founded by Chiniya Lal and Phatte Bahadur Singh which was closed after the imprisonment of the founders. He then joined Juddodaya School and completed his SLC level education from Durbar High School in 2004 BS. He then went to Tri-chandra College for his college education.

From his childhood, he was friends with Bijaya Malla, Gopal Prasad Rimal, Govinda Bahadur Malla and Shyam Das Vaishnav. His father was friends with the historian Baburam Acharya. His poems and historic articles were published in Sharada magazine.

Initially, he worked for Ministry of Foreign Affairs. Then he was transferred to Home ministry.

Nepali received MA degree in history from Tribhuvan University.

== Political career ==
In 1997 BS after Shukra Raj Shastri, Dashrath Chand, Ganga Lal Shrestha and Dharma Bhakta Mathema were murdered by the Rana government, he became involved in the politics. He started putting up anti-Rana pamphlets but he needed anonymity for doing so or he could have lost his job and even been punished by the government. So, he chose the alias Chhitaranjan Nepali.

== Literary career ==
Nepali started his career as a poet. His first Nepal Bhasa epic poem Ma Lumanka (Mother's memory) was published in 1950-1951 (2007 BS). He then published Janaral Bhimsen Thapa Ra Tatkalin Nepal with the aid of Nepal Sanskirti Sangh (Nepal Cultural Association) about the life of first prime minister of Nepal, Bhimsen Thapa. He won first ever Madan Puraskar prize alongside Satya Mohan Joshi and Balram Joshi.

== Personal life and death ==
Chittaranjan Nepali was married to Merri Baba Rajbhandari and had four children (one son and three daughters). He died in Kathmandu's Chabahil neighbourhood on 16 October 2023, at the age of 92.

== Awards ==
Nepali is recipient of various literary and civil awards. Some of the awards are:

- Madan Puraskar (2013 BS (1956-1957)) for Janaral Bhimsen Thapa Ra Tatkalin Nepal
- Shrestha Shirpa Puraskar (2022 BS (1965-1966))
- Subha Rajya Avishek Padak (2031 BS (1974-1975))
- Trishatti Patta - Second
- Durgam Sewa Padak
- Janapad Sewa Padak
- Janapad Dirga Sewa Padak

== Bibliography ==
- Ma Lumanka (Nepal Bhasa epic, 2007 BS (1950-1951))
- Janaral Bhimsen Thapa Ra Tatkalin Nepal
- Jungabahadurko Katha
- Shree 5 Ranbahadur Shah: Bektitva ra ShasanKal
- Parivarik Shadyantra
