= Leeladhwaj Thapa =

Nepalese writer (1921–1984)

- लीलाध्वज थापा
- Born: 1921 A.D. (1978 B.S. Ashadh); Kamal Pokhari, Kathmandu, Nepal
- Died: AD 1984
- Occupation: Novelist
- Writing career
- Notable work: Mann (मन)
- Notable awards: Madan Puraskar 2014 B.S.

Leeladhwaj Thapa (Nepali:लीलाध्वज थापा) was a Nepali novel writer. He was awarded Madan Puraskar for the novel Mann (English: Heart) in 2014 B.S. It was the second year of Madan Puraskar. Mann is the first novel to be awarded Madan Puraskar. It was based on Nepali society.

His other work is Sabaiko Lagi published in 2026 B.S.
