= Kamal Pokhari =

Historic pond in Kathmandu, Nepal

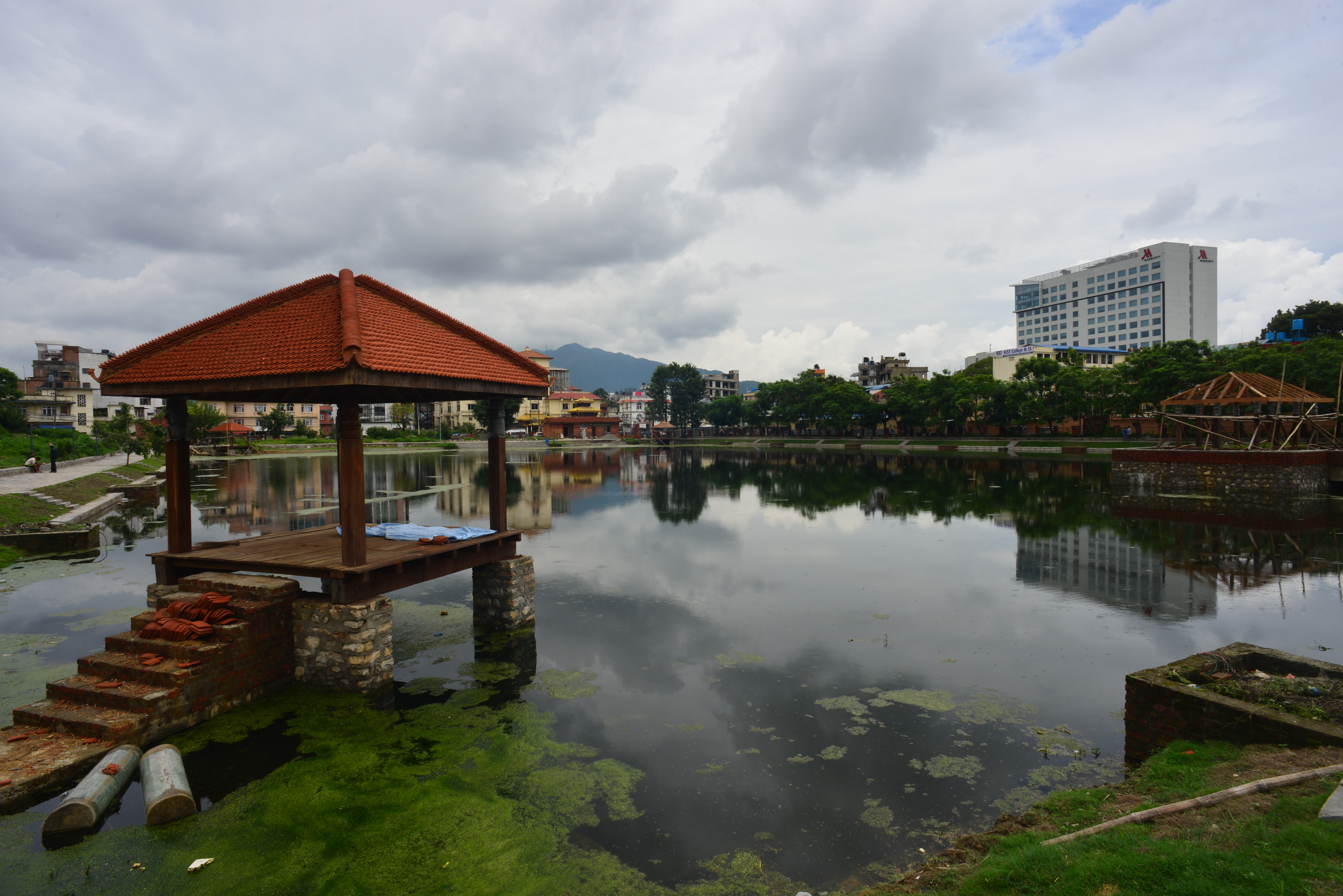
- Kamal Pokhari in 2021

- Location within Nepal
- Location: Kathmandu, Nepal
- Coordinates: 27.710743103502963°N 85.32518352287788°E
- Type: lake
- Etymology: 27.710743103502963, 85.32518352287788

Kamal Pokhari is a historic pond in Kathmandu, Nepal. The history of the pond is uncertain possibly dating back to the Licchavi-era and it had been used by the Malla kings. Kamal Pokhari had restored by Kathmandu Metropolitan City. The restoration project has received protests for using concrete which "deteriorates the originality of the traditional pond in the capital city".
