= Maharani (novel) =

Nepali novel by Chandra Prakash Baniya

- Author: Chandra Prakash Baniya
- Original title: महारानी
- Language: Nepali
- Subject: History
- Genre: Fiction
- Published: Shikha Books
- Publication date: 2019
- Publication place: Nepal
- Media type: Print
- Pages: 366
- Awards: Madan Puraskar 2076
- ISBN: 9937934451
- OCLC: 1140352663

Maharani (Nepali: महारानी, lit. 'Queen') is a Nepali novel written by Chandra Prakash Baniya. The book was published in 2019 and won Madan Puraskar in the same year.

== Synopsis ==
The book is a historical fiction based on Chaubisi Rajya and Baise rajya of Nepal. The story is about King Ghanashyam of Parbat and the controversy over his succession by his sons- Malebam and Bhadribam. Malebam is the elder son and has the birthright to the throne whereas Bhadribam was conceived earlier but born later. When Malebam is declared king, Bhadribam revolts while his wife, to everyone's surprise, supports Malebam. In recognition of her efforts to save Parbat, the palace gives her the status of "Maharani". But, she takes Sannyasa secretly and leaves to Vindravan. From that time, the people of Parbat have been worshipping her as Maharani. The book also depicts the life, administrative system and justice system of Parbat during that period.

== Reception ==
The book won the prestigious Madan Puraskar for the year 2076 BS (2019).

== See also ==
- Mokshabhumi
- Palpasa Café
- Seto Dharti
- Radha
