= Karnali Lok Sanskriti =

Nepalese non-fiction book

- Cover page of the box set
- Authors: Pradeep Rimal; Chudamani Bandhu; Bihari Krishna Shrestha; Sthirjunga Bahadur Singh; Satyamohan Joshi
- Original title: कर्णाली लोक संस्कृति
- Language: Nepali
- Subject: Karnali region
- Genre: Non-fiction
- Publisher: Royal Nepal Academy
- Publication date: 2028 BS (1971–1972) AD
- Publication place: Nepal
- Media type: Print
- Award: Madan Puraskar

Karnali Lok Sanskriti (Nepali: कर्णाली लोक संस्कृति) is a 1971 Nepali language collection of research in a form of book about the Karnali region, which lies on the western part of Nepal. It was written by a group of writers and scholars namely Pradeep Rimal, Chudamani Bandhu, Bihari Krishna Shrestha, Sthirjunga Bahadur Singh and Satya Mohan Joshi. The book has five volumes each describing history, geography, society, language, and literature of the Karnali region. The book was awarded Madan Puraskar in 2028 BS (1971). The book is considered a pioneer study about the Karnali region.

== Background ==
After publishing Hamro Lok Sanskriti, Satyamohan Joshi was given the post of director in the cultural department of Nepal government. While in office, Joshi formed a panel of experts and conducted a field survey of Karnali region which lasted for six months. This book is a collection of findings of their works.

== Synopsis ==
The book has five volumes. The volumes are:

- Itihas (Nepali: इतिहास, lit. 'History'). The first volume of the set, written by Satya Mohan Joshi, deals with the history of Karnali region.
- Bhaugolik Drishtikon (Nepali: भौगोलिक दृष्टिकोण, lit. 'Geographical Viewpoint'): The second volume deals with the geography. It was written by Sthirjunga Bahadur Singh.
- Jana Jiban (Nepali: जनजीवन, lit. 'Anthropology'): The third volume deals with the anthropology and was written by Bihari Krishna Shrestha.
- Bhasa (Nepali: भाषा, lit. 'Language'): The fourth volume deals with the language and literature of Karnali. It was written by Chundamani Bandhu.
- Sahitya, Sangeet, Kala (Nepali: साहित्य, सङ्गीत, कला, lit. 'Culture, Music and Arts'): The fifth volume deals with the culture, festivals and folk songs of Karnali. It was written by Pradeep Rimal.

== Awards ==
The book won Madan Puraskar in 2028 BS (c. 1971- 1972). The prize was equally divided among the authors.

== See also ==
- Hamro Lok Sanskriti
- Mahakavi Devkota
- Limbuwanko Etihasik Dastavej Sangraha
