= Limbuwanko Etihasik Dastavej Sangraha =

Nepalese historical book about Limbuwan region

Limbuvanko Eitihasik Dastabej Sangraha 1662–1963 AD
- Cover page
- Author: Bhagi Raj Ingnam
- Original title: लिम्बुवानको ऐतिहासिक दस्तावेज सङ्ग्रह: सम्वत् १७१९–२०२०
- Language: Nepali
- Genre: History
- Published: 2020
- Publisher: Yakthung Publication
- Publication date: 25 December 2020
- Publication place: Nepal
- Pages: 916
- Award: Madan Puraskar (2020)
- ISBN: 9937079780

Limbuvanko Eitihasik Dastabej Sangraha 1662–1963 AD (Nepali: लिम्बुवानको ऐतिहासिक दस्तावेज संग्रह: सम्वत् १७१९–२०२०, lit. 'Collection of historical records from Limbuwan 1662–1963 CE') is a historical book about the Limbuwan region in eastern part of Nepal written and compiled by Bhagi Raj Ingnam. It was published on 25 December 2020 by Yakthung Publication and won the Madan Puraskar for the year 2020 (2077 BS).

It is an educational record of the people and culture of the Limbuwan region from year 1662 CE to 1963 CE. Ingnam spent seven years and Rs. 1.3 million for the research.

== Synopsis ==
The book is a collection and documentation of historical artifacts and documents from Limbuwan region of Nepal from 1662 to 1963.

The book contains 395 documents of Pallo Kirat (Far Kirat) Limbuwan before and after the annexation of Nepal alongside that of Majh Kirat (Khambuwan), Wallo Kirat (Near Kirat) and other places in the country. It contains three hundred and one years of historical material. The first part of the 916-page book contains the original ink seals, red seals and stamps provided by the kings. In the second part, there are copies of ink seal, red seal and Rukka. The third part consists of letters send by Rana Prime Ministers and government officials, petitions, gross receipts, orders, and military exchanges between the region and the center.

== Reception ==
The book the prestigious Nepali literary award, Madan Puraskar for the year 2077 BS. A cash prize of Rs. 400,000 was given alongside to the award. The sales of the book increased after winning the award and the rights of the book was obtained by the Sajha Prakashan, the national publishing house for future reprints.

== See also ==
- Nepalko Balinali ra Tinko Digo Kheti
- Karnali Lok Sanskriti
- Hamro Lok Sanskriti
