= Bhagi Raj Ingnam =

Nepali historian (born 1956)

- भगिराज इङ्नाम
- Born: 1956 (age 69–70); Aathrai, Terathum
- Occupations: Civil Service (Retired); Historian
- Notable work: Limbuwanko Etihasik Dastavej Sangraha
- Awards: Madan Puraskar, 2077 BS

Bhagi Raj Ingnam (Limbu) (Nepali: भगिराज इङ्नाम) is a Nepalese historian and retired government official. He is a researcher on Limbuwan history and traditions.

== Biography ==
He was born and brought up in Aathrai village, Terathum in a Subba (village chief) family. He studied Public Administration and passed the Loksewa examination to work as a civil servant for Nepal government. He served the government for 36 years and retired as the chief district officer of Dhankuta in 2014. While preparing for civil service examinations, he found out that the mainstream Nepali history, the one that also appeared in those exams, differed a lot from the actual history. So, he started researching about the Limbuwan history.

He spent seven years and NRs. 1.3 million to write his Madan Puraskar winning book, Limbuwanko Etihasik Dastavej Sangraha.

== Awards ==
In 2021, he won the Madan Puraskar, Nepal's highest literary honour, for his book Limbuwanko Etihasik Dastavej Sangraha. The book was selected out of 222 submission.

== Works ==
Title of the book	Publisher	Date of Publication	ISBN	Awards
Tehrathum Jilla ma Subhangi Pratha	Nepal Academy	2013	9789937589499	
Limbu Jatiko Itihas	Makalu Publication House	2018	978-9937-0-4595-7	
Limbuwanko Etihasik Dastavej Sangraha	Yakthung Publication	2020	9789937079785	Madan Puraskar 2020

== See also ==
- Satya Mohan Joshi
- Baburam Acharya
- Kesar Lall
