= Bala Ram Joshi =

Nepalese scientist and physicist

Dr. Bala Ram Joshi
- बलराम जोशी
- Born: 1930; Dillibazar, Kathmandu, Nepal
- Died: 1993 (aged 62–63)
- Education: Ph.D.
- Alma mater: Glasgow University
- Occupation: Physicist
- Notable work: Adhikbibhav Sthirbidhoot Utpadhak
- Spouse: Angur Baba Joshi
- Parents: Chandra Kumari Joshi (mother); Himalaya Raj Joshi (father)
- Awards: Madan Puraskar, 1956

Dr. Bala Ram Joshi (1930–1993) was a Nepalese scientist and professor of physics who made significant contributions to the fields of science and technology of Nepal. His Ph.D. thesis at The University of Glasgow, Studies of orbital electron capture by scintillation counter methods, thesis earned him the Thomson Prize at the University of Glasgow.

== Early life and background ==
Joshi was born to Himalaya Raj Joshi and Chandra Kumari Joshi in 1987 BS in Dillibazaar, Kathmandu. His father died when he was just eight months old and his mother was just 15 years old. After the death of his father, Joshi was raised at his maternal grandparents' house in Dhoka Tole, Kathmandu where he completed his primary education. Later he was admitted to Durbar High School, Ranipokhari, Kathmandu. He secured high ranks in his class and received many accolades.

Joshi married Angur Baba Joshi in 2000 B.S. Angur is also a well-known educator and social worker in Nepal. Their marriage was performed based on the then Nepali custom and tradition. At the time of marriage, Joshi was 12 years old and his wife then was 11 years old. The couple studied together and both of them passed the SLC (school leaving certificate) exam in 1948. After completion of their primary school level education, Joshi did his Intermediate in Science (I.Sc.) in 1950 and later on completed his Bachelor in Science in 1952. Similarly, he completed M. Sc in Physics from Banaras Hindu University, Banaras, India in 1954.

== Later life ==
After completion of his M.Sc. in 1954, Joshi returned to Nepal and began teaching at Tri-Chandra College, Kathmandu. After three years, Joshi was nominated for a Ph.D. fellowship under the Colombo Plan and subsequently traveled to the United Kingdom with his wife in 1957. During their educational settlement in the United Kingdom, Joshi studied at Glasgow University while his wife continued her education at Oxford University. His Ph.D. studies culminated in his research presentation titled "Studies of Orbital Electron by Scintillation Counter Method." His presentation earned him the Thomson Award. He had also published several research articles in Proceedings of the Physical Society in London. In addition to these publications, he had published one research article in a scientific journal of Sweden. He was awarded Madan Puraskar in 1956 (2013 B.S.) for his book named Adhikbibhav Sthirbidhoot Utpadhak (Ultra High Voltage Static Electric Generator).

== Dr. Bala Ram Joshi Award ==
Dr. Bala Ram Joshi's award (Dr Balaram Joshi Gyan Bigyan Puraskar) was initiated in his memory by his wife in 1996. The award honors outstanding contributions in the field of Science and Knowledge in Nepal.

== Publications ==
- Studies of orbital electron capture by scintillation counter methods
- On the Measurement of Orbital Electron Capture with particular reference to 131Cs
- Orbital Electron Capture Ratio and Beta Spectrum of 204Tl
- Internal Source Scintillation Spectrometry
