= Hamro Lok Sanskriti =

1956 book by Satya Mohan Joshi

- Author: Satya Mohan Joshi
- Original title: हाम्रो लोक संस्कृति
- Language: Nepali
- Subject: Folk culture
- Genre: Cultural
- Publisher: Ratna Pustak Bandhar
- Publication date: 1956
- Publication place: Nepal
- Awards: Madan Puraskar
- Followed by: Nepali Rastriya Mudra

Hamro Lok Sanskriti (Nepali: हाम्रो लोक संस्कृति, lit. 'Our Folk Culture') is a 1956 book by Satya Mohan Joshi. It is about the folk culture of Nepal. The book won the Madan Puraskar, Nepal's highest literary honour.

== Background ==
In 1943, Satya Mohan Joshi worked at Nepal's Department of Industrial and Commercial Intelligence; he surveyed and created reports about the social economy in two districts Tanahun and Lamjung. As he visited the districts, Joshi saw people singing in various areas including fields, jungles, and Chautara (a place where people communicate and share information). In the afternoon, the villagers would sing songs with madals and performed Maruni, Kaura, Chudka, Sorathi, and Jhyamrey dances. Music was an extensive part of the villagers' life which fascinated Joshi.

He wanted to reveal these songs throughout Nepal but the country did not have radio stations until 1951, instead he published the songs in a literary magazine Sarada. Balkrishna Sama, an editor of the magazine, recommended that he should provide contexts for each song so Joshi wrote about their histories and his own analysis. In the start, he found it difficult to write context about the song because no one had penned about the culture of Nepal. Afterwards, he collected the published lyrics from the magazine and issued the book Hamro Lok Sanskriti. While Joshi was working on publishing the book, he met poet Gopal Prasad Rimal who encouraged him to "treasure the folk culture, the stories, songs, and lifestyle of Nepal's rural population".

== Release and legacy ==
In 1956, the first Madan Puraskar, Nepal's highest literary honour, ceremony was held and it was the first book to win the award, alongside two other books General Bhimsen Thapa Ra Tatkalin Nepal, and Adhikbibhav Sthirbidhoot Utpadhak. Joshi later stated that the book was not his creation rather it was villagers' so "the credit should go to them". He later assisted to create numerous organizations to preserve the culture of Nepal. Joshi went on to win two more Madan Puraskar for Nepali Rastriya Mudra (1957), and Karnali Lok Sanskriti (1971).

== See also ==
- Karnali Lok Sanskriti
- Mahakavi Devkota
- Limbuwanko Etihasik Dastavej Sangraha
