= Satya Mohan Joshi =

Nepali writer and scholar (1920–2022)

- सत्यमोहन जोशी
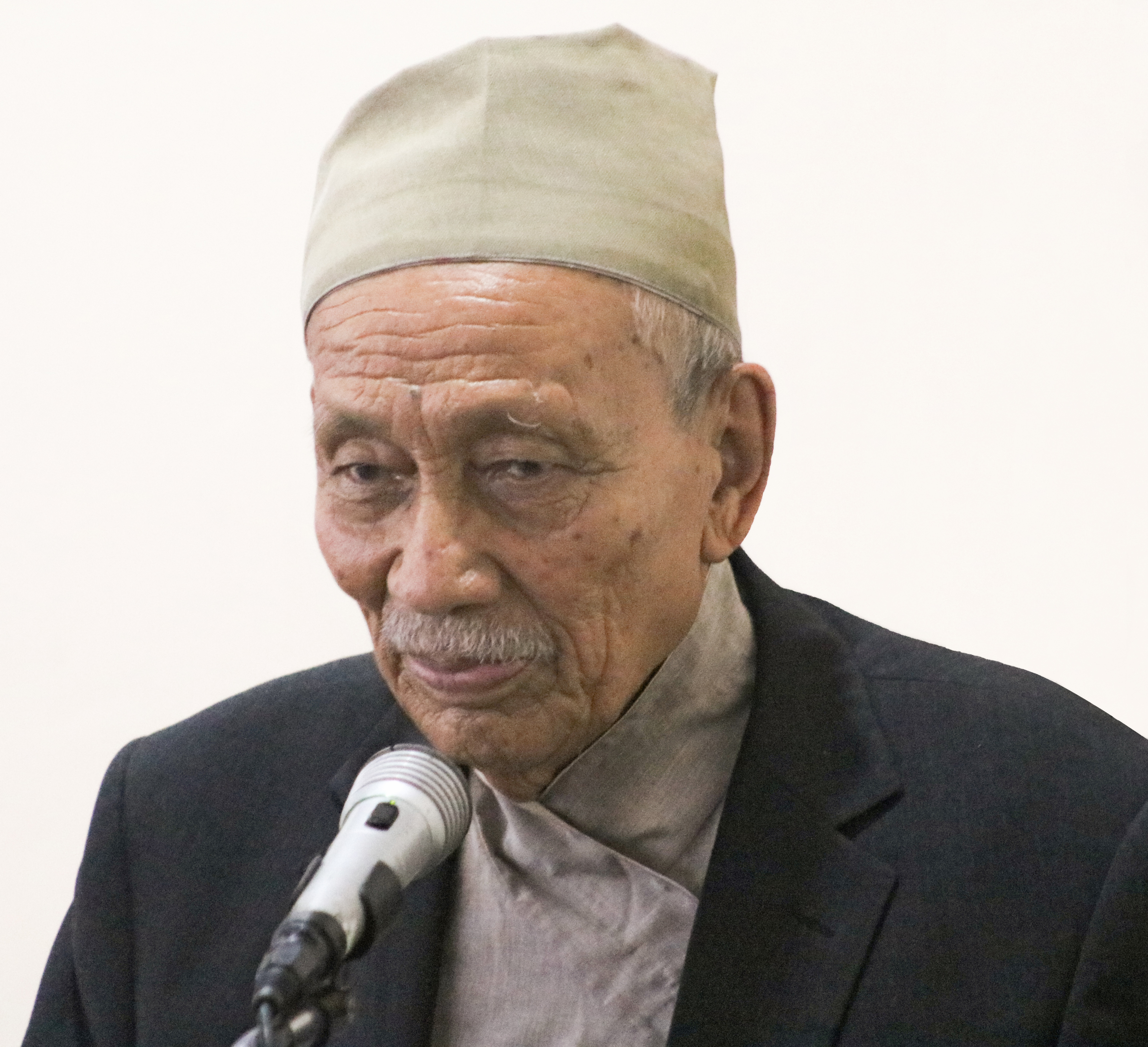
- Born: 12 May 1920; Lalitpur District, Nepal
- Died: 16 October 2022 (aged 102); Lalitpur, Nepal
- Education: BA
- Alma mater: Durbar High School; Trichandra College
- Occupations: Writer, researcher
- Spouse: Radha Devi
- Parent(s): Shankar Raj Joshi, Raj Kumari Joshi
- Writing career
- Notable work: Hamro Lok Sanskriti
- Notable awards: Madan Puraskar 3 times (1956, 1960, 1970); Order of Gorkha Dakshina Bahu

Satya Mohan Joshi (Nepali: सत्यमोहन जोशी; 12 May 1920 – 16 October 2022) was a Nepalese writer and scholar. Joshi is known for his research on the history and culture of Nepal. He also served as the chancellor of the Nepal Bhasa Academy.

== Early life and education ==
Joshi was born on 12 May 1920 to Shankar Raj and Raj Kumari Joshi, in the Lalitpur district of Nepal. Having learnt his alphabets at home, he later enrolled at Durbar High School in Kathmandu. At the age of 17, he was married to Radha Devi Shrestha of Patan. He completed his bachelor's degree at Trichandra College, became the first director of the Archaeological and Cultural Department in 1959, and established the Rastriya Naachghar – National Theatre in Kathmandu, Archeological Garden in Patan, Archeological Museum in Taulihawa and the National Painting Museum in Bhaktapur.

== Career ==
After King Mahendra's coup in 1960, Joshi flew to China, where he began to teach Nepali at the Peking Broadcasting Institute. During his stay in China, he carried out research on Araniko, a sculptor of the Malla dynasty who migrated to China in early 1260 AD. He set up the Araniko White pagoda Gallery in Kirtipur, Kathmandu, using historical artifacts related to Araniko.

He has more than 60 publications in various fields, which include Hamro Lok Sanskriti (Madan Puraskar in 1956); Nepali Rastriya Mudra (Madan Puraskar of 1960); Karnali Lok Sanskriti (a research collection); Charumati, Sunkeshari, Majipha Lakhe, Bagh Bhairab (dramas).

== Recognition ==
A national postal stamp, showing his portrait, was issued in his name in 2021. A total of 100,000 copies each with the value of NPR 10 were printed. The Nepal Rastra Bank issued three new coins of denominations Rs 100, Rs 1,000 and Rs 2,500 in September 2019, featuring Joshi's portrait, to commemorate his 100th birthday. On 17 November 2021, Joshi became the first person to receive Nepal's electronic passport. A road in Lalitpur was named in his honour. On 18 March 2022, his biography titled Satyamohan was published. The biography was written by Girish Giri, a writer and reporter.

== Death ==
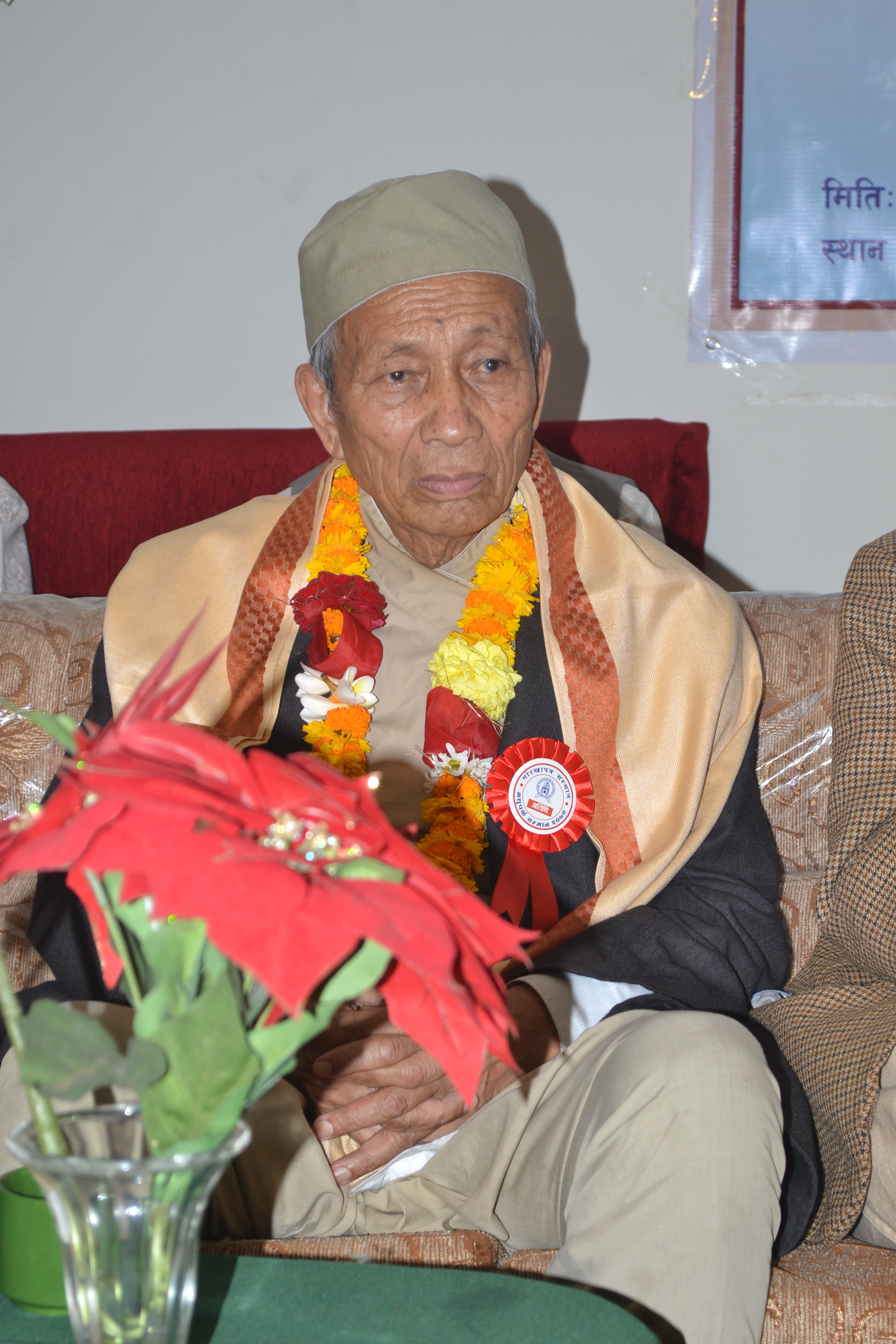
Joshi at a programme organized by Gorkhapatra Sansthan in Tinkune (2013)

Joshi died at age 102 on 16 October 2022 at KIST Hospital in Lalitpur. As per his wishes, his body was donated to a hospital for research. Prime Minister Sher Bahadur Deuba, the Mayor of Lalitpur Metropolitan City Chiri Babu Maharjan and other politicians paid their tribute. The funeral of Joshi was accompanied by state honours.

His astrological birth chart (china or janma–kundali in Nepali) was cremated, in place of his body, at Shankhamul Ghat by his sons Anu Raj Joshi and Purna Raj Joshi. The ashes were then dispersed on the Bagmati river, according to Hindu customs. A one-day public holiday was provided on 18 October 2022, to mourn his death, by the Government of Nepal.

== Notable works ==
- Nepali Lok Git: Ek Adhyayan
- Hamro Lok Sanskriti
- Nepali Rastriya Mudra
- Lama ra Pachuke
- Sipahi ra Raiti
- Gulab ra Gurans
- Daila ko Batti
- Rajamukut ra Rajyaabhishek
- Kalakar Arniko
- Sunkhesari
- Majipa Lakhe
- Nepali Chaadparva
- Pharkera Herda
- Ek Saya Shabda
- Nepali Murtikala Ko Bikashkaram

== Honors and awards ==
- Order of Tri Shakti Patta
- Order of Gorkha Dakhina Bahu
- Ujjwal Kirtiman Rashtradeep
- Madan Puraskar
- Bhanubhakta Award
- Honorary Certificate of Ph.D. (Kathmandu University)
- Padmashree Sadhana Award
