= Srasta ra Sahitya =

Anthology of essays by Uttam Kunwar

- Cover page of the book
- Author: Uttam Kunwar
- Original title: स्रष्टा र साहित्य
- Language: Nepali
- Genre: Non-fiction (Essay)
- Published: 1966
- Publisher: Sajha Prakashan, Uttam Kunwar Smarak Puraskar Guthi
- Publication place: Nepal
- Media type: Print (Paperback)
- Pages: 251
- Award: Madan Puraskar, 2023 BS
- ISBN: 9789937853835
- OCLC: 31253520

Srasta ra Sahitya (Nepali: स्रष्टा र साहित्य, lit. 'Writer and literature') is a collection of essays by Uttam Kunwar. The book was published on 1966 by Sajha Prakashan. The essays are based on the writer's interview with thirty-five prominent Nepali writers, poets and litterateurs.

The book won the Madan Puraskar in the same year. Kunwar worked as an editor for popular Nepali literary magazine Ruprekha and was an active literary journalist. The book's popularity and thematic variety and interest not only attracted the readers, but also gained recognition as a supporting material for various universities.

== Synopsis ==
Kunwar worked as an editor for popular Nepali literary magazine Ruprekha. He conducted interviews with various Nepali writers. The interviews were not in simple question and answer format but were in a conversational way between Kunwar and writers that helped the readers know the writers in a more familiar and humane manner. He wrote essays based on those interviews.

Some of the writers included in the book are:-

- Baburam Acharya, Nepalese historian
- Bhupi Sherchan, Nepalese poet
- Balkrishna Sama, Nepalese playwright
- Indra Bahadur Rai, Indian-Nepali writer
- Lekhnath Paudyal, Nepalese writer
- Kedar Man Vyathit, Nepalsese poet
- Krishna Chandra Singh Pradhan, Nepalese literary critic and essayist
- Madhav Prasad Ghimire, Nepalese poet
- M.B.B. Shah, Former king of Nepal and a poet
- Parijat, Nepalese poet and writer.
- Siddhicharan Shrestha, Nepali poet

== Award ==
Kunwar won the prestigious Madan Puraskar for the year 2023 BS (1966) at the age of 27.

== Translations and Reprint ==
The book was reprinted by Uttam Kunwar Memorial Award Fund in 2013.

Various essays from the books are translated into English by Niranjan Kunwar for The Record, an independent digital publication house.

On the occasion of the 60th anniversary celebration of Nepal-Russia diplomatic relation on September 30, 2016, Nepal Russia Literary Association, headed by Prof Dr Jangab Chauhan released a Russian translation of the book.

== See also ==
- Abstract Chintan Pyaj
- Hamro Lok Sanskriti
- Karnali Lok Sanskriti
