= Ratna Pustak Bhandar =

Book company in Nepal

- Parent company: Ratna Pustak Bhandar
- Status: Active
- Founded: 1946
- Founder: Ram Das Shrestha and Ratna Prasad Shrestha
- Country of origin: Nepal
- Headquarters location: Kathmandu
- Publication types: Nepali Literature, Asian Studies, Himalayan Studies, Religious, Fictional, Art, Travelogue, Memoirs
- Fiction genres: Nepali and English literature, coursebook, folklore, biography and more
- Official website: www.shopratnaonline.com

Ratna Pustak Bhandar is a privately owned distributor, publisher and retailer of books in Nepal's capital city, Kathmandu, and is the oldest bookstore in Nepal. They also operate online via different digital platforms.

== History ==
Ratna Pustak Bhandar was established in 1946. It is the oldest book store of the country. The founders of the store are Ram Das Shrestha and Ratna Prasad Shrestha.

The history of Nepal's oldest bookshop dating back to 1939, when Ram Das Shrestha started selling books, mostly religious, in a cart in Bhotahity, near Ratna Park, Kathmandu. It was called Ram Das and Sons and renamed Ratna Pustak Bhandar (English, "Gem Book Store") in 1946 after his eldest son, Ratna Prasad Shrestha.

== Publications ==
Ratna Prasad Shrestha published his first book Bhagawat Strota, followed by Varnamala (alphabet book in Nepali) and Pancha Strota, and made a historical foray by laying a foundation stone of Ratna Pustak Bhandar.

This was at a time when the general citizens were deprived of knowledge by the then regime of the country (before Nepal's adoption of democracy in 1990 there were only two publishing houses operating: "the government-run Sajha Pustak Bhandar and the privately-owned Ratna Pustak Bhandar Ratna"). Since then Ratna Pustak Bhandar has been providing a wide range of books to the people by publishing, importing and distributing throughout the country. Textbooks for schools and colleges are also issued.

== Notable authors ==
Ratna Pustak Bhandar has also provided a platform for many aspiring writers, who are the literary figures of the nation now. Lekhnath Paudyal, Balkrishna Sama, Siddhicharan Shrestha, Kedarman Byathit, Bishweshwor Prasad Koirala, Lain Singh Bangdel, Madan Mani Dixit, Shankar Lamichhane, Hridaya Chandra Singh Pradhan, Madhav Prasad Ghimire, Satya Mohan Joshi, Dhooswan Sayami, Bhairav Aryal, Tara Nath Sharma, Krishna Chandra Singh Pradhan, Abhi Subedi, Dhruba Chandra Gautam, Sanu Sharma, Govinda Raj Bhattarai, Padmawati Singh, Maya Thakuri and many other prominent figures of Nepalese literary world were and are associated with Ratna Pustak Bhandar.

Recently published authors include works by political figures such as Tara Rai.

== Recognition and awards ==
In recognition to the contribution for increasing the literacy rate of the country, Ratna Prasad Shrestha, as a founder of Ratna Pustak Bhandar, was listed "The Century's 101 Influential Nepalese" by Himal Magazine (13–27 April 2000). Likewise, PABSON (an association of Nepalese Private Schools), Hasane Samaj (Humorous Society) and Nepal Printer's Association have also awarded for the contribution to education. Similarly, for the publication of children's literature, Kavitaram Bal Sahitya Prabardan gave a special award in 2006. Ratna Pustak Bhandar was also honoured with the prestigious Madan Puraskar Award on its Diamond Jubilee Anniversary.

British anthropologist Mark Turin has nominated Ratna Pustak Bhandar as one of his "old favorites" among Nepal's publishing houses which "have weathered the country's recent political and social turmoil" and have survived into post-1990 democratic period alongside new publishing houses, often with family-run bookshops, such as Himal Books and Mandala.
