= Uttam Kunwar =

Nepalese journalist and writer (1938–1982)

- उत्तम कुँवर
- Born: Hari Bahadur Kunwar; 25 May 1938; Chhetrapati, Kathmandu
- Died: 30 July 1982 (aged 44); Kathmandu, Nepal
- Occupations: Writer, editor
- Notable work: Srasta ra Sahitya; Ruprekha(Editor)
- Spouse: Shanti Kunwar
- Parents: Janga Bahadur Kunwar (father); Bhagwati Kunwar (mother)
- Awards: Madan Puraskar

Uttam Kunwar (Nepali: उत्तम कुँवर; 1938–1982) was a Nepalese literary journalist, critic, and writer. He served as an editor for Ruprekha, one of the most popular literary magazine in Nepal, alongside Bal Mukunda Pandey. He won the Madan Puraskar in 1966 (2023 BS) for his book Srasta ra Sahitya, an anthology of literary interviews.

== Biography ==
He was born on 25 May 1938 (12 Jestha 1995 BS) in Chhetrapati, Kathmandu to father Janga Bahadur Kunwar and mother Bhagwati Kunwar. He obtained an IA degree in veterinary. He then ventured into the world of journalism. He worked as the editor of the Nepali literary magazine, Ruprekha. During his editorship, the magazine became widely popular. In 1966, he published Srasta ra Sahitya, a book of literary interviews with prominent Nepali writers such as Bhupi Sherchan, Parijat (writer), Madhav Prasad Ghimire, etc. He conducted those interviews from 1961 to 1996. The book earned him the prestigious Madan Puraskar for the same year.

He died on 30 July 1982 (15 Shrawan 2039 BS), of a cardiac arrest in his home at the age of 44.

== Notable works ==
- Srasta ra Sahitya (1966, Literary interview)
- Anubhav ra Anubhuti (Collection of essays)
- Sir Henry Lawrence ko Jiwani (Biography of Sir Henry Lawrence)

== Legacy ==
A literary foundation called Uttam Kunwar Memorial Award Trust was founded in his honor by his wife, Shanti Kunwar. The trust presents an award known as Uttam Shanti Puraskar every year to a non-fiction book in Nepali language. Prominent writers like Saru Bhakta, Ram Prasad Panta, Sarita Aryal, etc. have been felicitated with the award.

== See also ==
- Riddhi Bahadur Malla
- Bhawani Bhikshu
- Shankar Lamichhane
