= Bijaya Malla =

Nepalese writer (1925 - 1999)

- विजय मल्ल
- Born: Bijaya Bahadur Malla; 23 June 1925; Om Bahal, Kathmandu
- Died: 24 July 1999 (aged 74); Kathmandu
- Education: Tri-Chandra College
- Occupations: Writer, poet, playwright
- Notable work: Anuradha; Baula Kaji ko Sapana
- Spouse: Shyama Pradhan
- Children: 9
- Parents: Ananda Maya (mother); Riddhi Bahadur Malla (father)
- Relatives: Govinda Bahadur Malla (brother)
- Awards: Sajha Puraskar

Bijaya Malla (Nepali: विजय मल्ल) (23 June 1925 – 24 July 1999) was a Nepalese poet, novelist and playwright. Malla wrote multiple novels, plays and poems in his lifetime. He is best known for his novels like Anuradha and plays like Koi Kina Barbaad Hos, Baula Kaji ko Sapana and Dobhan.

== Early life and education ==
Malla was born on 23 June 1925 (10 Ashadh 1982 BS) in Om Bahal, Kathmandu as the third son to father, Riddhi Bahadur Malla and mother Ananda Maya. Malla's father was the editor and founder of a Nepali literary magazine called Sharada. Both he and his elder brother Govinda Bahadur Malla 'Gothale' were influenced by their literary family. He received his school level education from Durbar High School. He grew up reading the works of Shakespeare, Chekov and Ibsen. He received his high schooling education from Banaras Hindu University and enrolled for an ISc. (Intermediate of Science) education in Tri-Chandra College but could not complete his degree due to the political situation in the country.

== Literary and political career ==
His first poem Marnu Parcha Hai Dai was published in Sharada magazine (1997 BS, Shrawan, Year 6, Vol. 4) in 1940. His works are widely influenced by Freudian philosophy. He even served as the secretary of Nepal Academy.

He was attracted towards politics after the killing of four martyrs by the Rana government in 1941. He began to participate in the Nepal Praja Parishad in 1948 for which he was imprisoned for two years by the government 1948 to 1950. After 1950, Nepal Praja Parishad became Nepali Congress and Malla became the member of it. After Matrika Prasad Koirala split with Nepali congress and formed Praja Parishad, he left Nepali Congress and joined Praja Parishad.

== Notable works ==
=== Novels ===
- Anuradha (1961)
- Kumari Shobha (1982)
- Shrimati Sharada (1999)

=== Plays ===
- Patthar ko Katha (Story of a stone, 1971)
- Saat Ekanki (Seven one-act plays, 1971)
- Dobhaan (Confluence)
- Bhitte Ghadi (Clock)
- Sristi ko Parkhal Bhitra (Inside The Wall of Creation)
- Bhulaibhul ko Yetharta (Reality of Blunders)
- Koi Kina Barbaad Hos (Why Should One Be Devastated, 1969)
- Jiudo Laas (Live Corpse)
- Baula Kaji ko Sapana (Dream of A Lunatic)

=== Short-story collections ===
- Ek Bato Aneh Mod (One Road, Many Turnings, 1969)
- Pareva ra Kaidi (The Prisoner and the Dove, 1977)
- Manchhe ko Naach ra Anya Katha (A Man's Dance and Other Stories, 1995)

=== Poems ===
- Bijaya Mallaka Kavita (Poems of Bijaya Malla, 1959)

== Awards ==
He was awarded with Sajha Puraskar for his anthology of short stories, Ek Bato Aneh Mod in 1970. He has also been felicitated with other honors such as Ganki Bashundhara Puraskar (c. 1992), Bhupal Man Singh Karki Puraskar (c. 1996) and Ved Nidhi Puraskar (c. 1999) for his contribution to Nepali literature.

== Personal life and death ==
He married Shyama Pradhan in 1999 BS (c. 1942/ 1943) in Kathmandu. They had nine daughters (Nalini, Reeta, Neena Sheela, Uma, Rama, Srijana, Archana, Bandana) among whom Sheela died during childhood.

He died on 24 July 1999 (8 Shrawan 2056 BS).

== See also ==
- Govinda Bahadur Malla
- Shankar Lamichhane
- Bhawani Bhikshu
