= Mohan Koiralaka Kavita =

1973 book by Mohan Koirala

- First edition
- Author: Mohan Koirala
- Original title: मोहन कोइरालाका कविता
- Language: Nepali
- Genre: Poetry
- Publisher: Sajha Prakashan
- Publication date: 1973
- Publication place: Nepal
- Media type: Print
- Pages: 299
- Award: Sajha Puraskar
- OCLC: 30773637
- Preceded by: Palang Number 21
- Followed by: Sunka Shikarharu

Mohan Koiralaka Kavita (Nepali: मोहन कोइरालाका कविता, lit. 'Poems of Mohan Koirala') is an anthology of poems by Mohan Koirala. It was published in 1973 (2030 BS) by Sajha Publications. The poet is renowned for his long poems and introducing experimental and modernist style in Nepali literature. The book was edited by Dr. Ishwar Baral. Koirala won the Sajha Puraskar for this book.

== Synopsis ==
The book contained all the poems of the poet published in various journals and newspaper between 1953 and 1971. Pharsiko Jhara, Lek, Surya Dan, Himchuli Raktim Cha are some of the poems included in this anthology.

== Reception ==
The book won the prestigious Sajha Puraskar for 2030 BS (c. 1973-1974). The award is given every year to the best book published by the publication within that year. The poet also started getting national recognition after publishing this book.

== See also ==
- Bairagi Kailaka Kabitaharu
- Ghumne Mechmathi Andho Manche
- Muna Madan
- Tarun Tapasi
