= Pratyek Thau: Pratyek Manchhe =

1978 novel by Peter J. Karthak

- Cover page
- Author: Peter J. Karthak
- Original title: प्रत्येक ठाउँ : प्रत्येक मान्छे
- Language: Nepali
- Genre: Fiction
- Published: 1978
- Publisher: Sajha Prakashan
- Publication place: Nepal
- Media type: Print
- Pages: 226
- ISBN: 9789937935180
- OCLC: 499120591
- Preceded by: Manas
- Followed by: Peter Ka Katha

Pratyek Thau: Pratyek Manchhe (Nepali: प्रत्येक ठाउँ : प्रत्येक मान्छे) is a Nepali novel by writer and journalist Peter J. Karthak. It was published in 1978 by Sajha Prakashan. It is the first novel of the author who had previously penned an anthology of poems called Manas with poet Abhi Subedi.

== Synopsis ==
The book is set in Darjeeling, India where the author grew up. The story is based on a real life rape incident that took place in Darjeeling in October 1965.

== Reception ==
The book received the prestigious Sajha Puraskar for the year 2034 BS (c. 1978). Shankar Lamichhane wrote the foreword of the book. Lamichhane only wrote foreword for two books in his life, the other one being Shirishko Phool.

== Translation ==
The book was translated as Every Place : Every Person - A Himalayan Tale From Darjeeling by the author himself and published on December 1, 2004 by Vajra Books.

== See also ==
- Madhabi
- Faatsung
- Shirishko Phool
