= Peter J. Karthak =

Nepalese writer (1943 - 2020)

- पिटर जे. कार्थक
- Born: Peter John Karthak; 12 December 1943; Shillong, Assam Province, British India (present-day Meghalaya, India)
- Died: 16 April 2020 (aged 76); Lalitpur, Nepal
- Education: MA (English)
- Alma mater: Tribhuvan University
- Occupations: Writer, musician, journalist
- Notable work: Pratyek Thau : Pratyek Manchhe
- Spouse: Ranjana Prajapati
- Children: 2
- Awards: Sajha Puraskar, 1978

Peter John Karthak (12 December 1943—16 April 2020) was a Nepalese writer, musician and journalist. He wrote two novels, several poems and short stories and edited and wrote for multiple newspapers in his life. He is best known for his Sajha Puraskar–winning novel, Pratyek Thau: Pratyek Manchhe.

== Early life and education ==
He was born on 12 December 1943 in Shillong, Meghalaya (then Assam Province), India in a Christian Lepcha family. In the midst of World War II, his family left for Darjeeling. Karthak grew up in Darjeeling. He was brought up and educated initially at Peshok Tea Estate and Nor Busti, in Darjeeling. He then studied at Turnbill High School from 1956 and attended St Joseph’s College, North Point, both in Darjeeling. He moved to Kathmandu in 1965. He was granted a naturalised citizenship certificate by the-then His Majesty’s Government of Nepal. He received an MA degree in English from Tribhuvan University. He learnt music from Amber Gurung, the composer of Nepali national anthem.

== Musical career ==
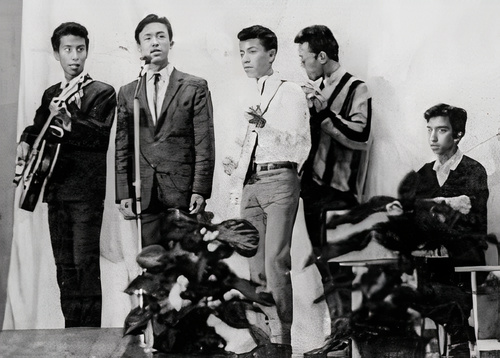
The Hillians (from left: K.K. Gurung, Peter Karthak, Mark Karthak, Phurba Tshering Bhutia and Ranjit Gazmer)

He was the lead guitarist of a band called The Hillians in Darjeeling. The band was formed in 1961 and was the first western band from the region. The name of the band was proposed by his friend Choden Tshering Bhutia. The band played at the coronation of Palden Thondup Namgyal, the last Chogyal (king) of Sikkim, in 1965 and was dubbed as "The Beatles of Sikkim". The Hillians disbanded around 1966/67.

He also played guitar for famous singer like Gopal Yonzon, Tara Devi and Narayan Gopal. He retired from his music part of life in 1990.

== Journalism career ==
He taught at Patan College and the Pulchowk Central Campus initially. He also taught at a private-sector university in Bangkok, and finally, at Kathmandu University in Kathmandu. He was with the founding editorial team at The Himalayan Times, in 2000 and The Kathmandu Post/ City Post, from 2002 to 2008. He worked as the copy chief for The Week, Republica for six years. He retired in 2015 after the 2015 Nepal earthquake.

== Literary career ==
His first poem Apocalypse: Rankhe Bhoot Haru was published in Ruprekha magazine in 1971. He co-authored Manas, an anthology of poetry with poets Abhi Subedi and Ramesh Shrestha in 1977.

He published two novels in his lifetime. His first novel Pratyek Thau: Pratyek Manchhe was published in 1978. Shankar Lamichhane wrote the preface for his novel. He translated the novel into English himself as Every Place, Every Person in 2004. He published his second novel in English titled Kathmandruids: Monomyths & Meanymyths in 2018.

He also wrote a book about Nepali musicians - Nepal's Music Makers: Between the Dales of Darjeeling and the Vales of Kathmandu in 2018.

== Awards ==
He won the prestigious Sajha Puraskar for his debut novel Pratyek Thau Pratyek Manche in 1978 (2034 BS).

== Personal life ==
He died on 16 April 2020, at around 5:30am at the age of 77 in Nepal Cancer Hospital, Lalitpur. His final rites were performed at Pashupati temple. He is survived by his wife, Ranjana Prajapati and two sons.

== See also ==
- Abhi Subedi
- Indra Bahadur Rai
- Lil Bahadur Chettri
