= Tarun Tapasi =

Nepali epic by Lekhnath Paudyal

- Cover page
- Author: Lekhnath Paudyal
- Original title: तरुण तपसी
- Language: Nepali
- Published: 1953
- Publisher: Sajha Prakashan
- Publication date: 1953
- Publication place: Nepal
- Media type: Print (Paperback)
- Pages: 128
- ISBN: 9789993327554
- Preceded by: Laalitya Vol. 1
- Followed by: Mero Rama (poem)

Tarun Tapasi (Nepali: तरुण तपसी, romanized: Taruṇa Tapasī, lit. 'The Young Ascetic') is a 1953 Nepali epic by Lekhnath Paudyal. It was published in 1953 by Sajha Prakashan. The epic is divided into 19 cantos and is written in Shikharini chhanda (meter). The poet called his epic a navya-kavya (modern type of poem), a new epic instead of maha-kavya (classical genre of epic).

== Synopsis ==
The epic is a lengthy, narrative poem. The epic begins with a poet who takes a rest under a tree in a chautari in evening time. The poet recently lost his wife and is grief-stricken. The poet decides to write something, but it becomes dark. A sage appears before him who represents the soul of the tree. The sage delivers a homily to the poet as the tree who has been rooted in a single place and has seen the seasons change. The sage talks to him about his hardships and the hardships of other people who he has seen and observed. The years of observations and learning through those observation enlightened the sadhu.

== Cantos ==
The first canto has 34 verses, introduced in the subject at the start of the poem. As the poet wanders, he reaches an uninhabited place. The sun is setting in the western sky during the rainy season. The holy river was flowing and many rocks were visible on the bank. The poet was distressed by the loss of his wife. His inner desire to do penance was awakening. As he lifted his pen to write about austerities, the sun went down and the world became black. A sage then appears before him. The poet presents various question to the sadhu which then becomes the subject of the poem.

The second canto has 27 verses. The sadhu narrates his life story in this canto.

There are 36 verses in the third canto. It contains the story of the sage growing up, playing with animals, his kite getting caught in a tree and observing a nesting bird as the day darkens.

The fourth canto has 26 verses, which include the description of the winter spent by the ascetic and the arrival of spring. It tells of him entering adolescence.

The fifth canto's 27 verses describe birds gathering and consulting, hunters killing birds. The construction of the chautara are presented in an interesting way.

The sixth canto has 31 verses, presenting the lament of the bird.

The seventh canto's 26 verses tell him to turn from violence to compassion.

There are 30 verses in the eighth canto, 29 verses in the ninth canto, 34 verses in the tenth canto, 36 verses in the eleventh canto, 28 verses in the twelfth canto, 32 verses in the thirteenth canto, 29 verses in the fourteenth canto, 38 verses in the fifteenth canto, 32 verses in the sixteenth canto, 24 verses in the seventeenth canto, 26 verses in the eighteenth canto and 36 verses in the nineteenth canto. These verses contain the experience of the ascetic.

== Symbolism ==
The poem is full of allegory and symbolism. The poet represents the author. Before writing this epic, the author had lost his first wife and was grief-struck. A divine revelation caused him to write the poem. The poem observes the world ideologically and philosophically through the Divine ascetic's neutral commentary on the pleasures and sorrows of life such as ostentation, conservatism, oppression, exploitation, religion and rituals. The theme is the benevolent tree of nature, which devotes its entire life to philanthropy, in the guise of young ascetic, to self-absorbed mankind. The poem also discusses how the anomalies, inconsistencies, chaos and greed of the human who are considered to be divine creation but have arisen due to various shortcomings are making society miserable. As in Paudyal's poem Pinjada Ko Suga, he uses a bird as a metaphor for the oppressed.

== Reception ==
Playwright and litterateur Balkrishna Sama wrote the foreword of the book in a later edition on March 22, 1965. He considered this epic to be a milestone in Nepali literature.

The poem was appreciated by Nepalese readers. On January 4, 1955, on the seventeenth anniversary of the poet, the Nepalese poetry society placing the author on a ratha (chariot). The chariot was pulled from Thamel to an ancient round tree in Tundikhel by thousands of admirers. King Tribhuvan presented his compliments. Then prime minister Matrika Prasad Koirala, Mahakabi Laxmi Prasad Devkota, playwright Balkrishna Sama, poet Siddhicharan Shrestha, the then home minister Tanka Prasad Acharya, American priest Fr. Moran were some of the notables who pulled the chariot. The wheels of the chariot were engraved with Satyam Shivam Sundaram. A team of four Scouts units, eight women cavalry, and a military musical troupe accompanied the procession.

== See also ==
- Muna Madan
- Shakuntala
- Gauri
