= Aagat =

1975 novel by Bhawani Bhikshu

- First edition
- Author: Bhawani Bhikshu
- Original title: आगत
- Language: Nepali
- Genre: Regional fiction (Aanchalik upanyas)
- Published: 1975 (2032 BS)
- Publisher: Sajha Prakashan
- Publication date: 1975
- Publication place: Nepal
- Media type: Print (Paperback)
- Pages: 598
- Awards: Madan Puraskar; Sajha Puraskar
- Preceded by: Subhadra Bajai
- Followed by: Pipe No. 2

Aagat (Nepali: आगत) is a Nepali novel by Bhawani Bhikshu. It was published in 1975 (2032 BS) by Sajha Prakashan. It won the prestigious Madan Puraskar in the same year. Bhikshu spent 25 years to complete the novel.

== Synopsis ==
The novel depicts the lifestyle and culture of the Madhesh region of Nepal. The book presents transitional period of Nepali history. The period when land-reform and the uprooting of feudal aristocracy was happening is depicted in the novel. The novel is considered a first Aanchalik (regional) writing of Nepali literature.

== Awards ==
The book won the Madan Puraskar for 2032 BS (1975) presented by the Madan Puraskar Guthi. It also received the Sajha Puraskar in the same year which is awarded to the best book published within the Sajha Publications.

== See also ==
- Ghumne Mechmathi Andho Manche
- Ghamka Pailaharu
- Madhabi
