= Shabdatit Shantanu =

1999 novel by Banira Giri

- Cover page
- Author: Banira Giri
- Original title: शब्दातीत शान्तनु
- Language: Nepali
- Published: 1999
- Publisher: Sajha Prakashan
- Publication date: 1999
- Publication place: Nepal
- Media type: Print (Paperback)
- Pages: 131
- Award: Sajha Puraskar, 1999
- OCLC: 44614419
- Preceded by: Nirbandha

Shabdatit Shantanu (Nepali: शब्दातीत शान्तनु) is a 1999 Nepali novel by poet Banira Giri. It was published in 1999 (2056 BS) by Sajha Prakashan and won the Sajha Puraskar for the same year, making Giri the second woman to win the award.

== Synopsis ==
The book is set in Lahan village and depicts the life of that place and other nearby places.

== Reception ==
The book won the prestigious Sajha Puraskar in 1999. Giri was the first woman to win the prize.

== See also ==
- Shirishko Phool
- Madhabi
- Yogmaya
