= Yojana Gandha =

1995 Nepali novel by Binod Prasad Dhital

- First edition
- Author: Binod Prasad Dhital
- Original title: योजनगन्धा
- Language: Nepali
- Genre: Hindu mythology
- Published: 1995
- Publisher: Sajha Prakashan
- Publication date: 1995
- Publication place: Nepal
- Media type: Print
- Pages: 522
- Awards: Madan Puraskar; Sajha Puraskar
- ISBN: 9789993324911
- Preceded by: Ujyalo Hunu Aghi

Yojangandha (Nepali: योजनगन्धा) is a Nepali novel by Binod Prasad Dhital. It was published in 1995 by Sajha Prakashan. The book is based on a character from Mahabharata, Satyawati. The book won the prestigious Madan Puraskar. It is second book of the author who previously penned a regional novel called Ujyalo Hunu Aghi.

== Synopsis ==
The book depicts the story of Satyawati as she emerges from being a daughter of a fisherman to the queen of Hastinapur. The plot of Yojangandha is mainly based on Mahabharata and partly on Harivansh Purana and Devi Bhagavata. Yojangandha is also one of the innumerable characters hidden within the vastness of the gigantic book Mahabharata. The Hindu mythological female character Yojanagandha also has a significant place in the Mahabharata, while the novelist Dhital has portrayed Yojanagandha as the main character in this novel.

== Characters ==
- Satyawati, an adopted daughter of a fisherman.
- King Shantanu, king of Hastinapur
- Bhisma, son of Shantanu and goddess Ganga
- Vyasa, son of Satyawati with Parashara
- Parashara, a sage
- Chitrangada, son of Satyawati and Shantanu
- Vichitravirya, son of Satyawati and Shantanu

== Reception ==
The book received the Madan Puraskar 2052 BS (1995 CE), the highest literary honor in Nepali literature. The book also won the Sajha Puraskar in the same year.

== See also ==
- Madhabi
- Yogmaya
- Nepali Shakuntala
