= Mohan Koirala =

Nepali poet (1926–2007)

- मोहन कोइराला
- Born: 26 November 1926; Kathmandu
- Died: 22 February 2007 (aged 80)
- Occupation: Poet
- Notable work: Nadi Kinarko Majhi (1981); Mohan Koiralaka Kavita; Ritu Nimantrana
- Father: Iswori Prasad Koirala
- Awards: Madan Puraskar (c. 1981); Sajha Puraskar (c. 1973, c. 1983)

Mohan Koirala (Nepali: मोहन कोइराला; 1926–2007) was a Nepalese poet, known for his prose poems and poems against the Rana regime. Some of this poems has been translated in English. He won Madan Puraskar in 2038 BS (c. 1981 AD).

== Biography ==
Mohan Koirala was born in Kathmandu on 26 November 1926 (11 Mangshir 1983 BS). Due to his father's economic conditions, Koirala had to skip college education before completion. He worked on various jobs around Nepal such as schoolmaster in Hetauda or as a transport corporation officer in Kathmandu.

His first poem is Jada Jadai which was published in 1953. From 1999 to 2004 he became vice-chancellor of the Royal Nepal Academy due to his contribution to the Nepali literature.

== Awards ==
- Madan Puraskar for Nadi Kinarko Majhi in 2038 BS (c. 1981 AD)
- Sajha Puraskar for Mohan Koiralaka Kavita in 2030 BS (c. 1973 AD)
- Sajha Puraskar for Ritu Nimantrana in 2040 BS (c. 1983 AD)

== Works ==
Some of his published books are:

- Sarangi Bokeko Samundar (2032 BS; c. 1975 AD)
- Nilo Maha (2032 BS; c. 1975 AD)
- Himchuli Raktim Cha (2035 BS; c. 1978 AD)
- Ritu Nimantrana (2040 BS; c. 1983 AD)
- Mohan Koiralaka Kabita (2030 BS; c. 1973 AD)
- Nadi Kinaraka Majhi (2039 BS; c. 1982 AD)
- Auta Pipalrko Paat (2047 BS; c. 1990 AD)
- Kabitabare Kehi Charcha (2035 BS; c. 1978 AD)
- Lek (2025 BS; c. 1968 AD)
- Gajpath (2059 BS; c. 2002 AD)
- Aja Kasailai Bida Garnu Cha (2060 BS; c. 2003 AD)
- Simsarka Rajdoot (2065 BS; c. 2008 AD)

== Personal life ==
He married Sabitri Koirala and he had five children. He died on 22 February 2007 (10 Falgun 2063 BS).

== See also ==
- Bhupi Sherchan
- Bairagi Kainla
- Laxmi Prasad Devkota
