= Jyoti Jyoti Mahajyoti =

1988 Nepali novel by Daulat Bikram Bista

- First edition
- Author: Daulat Bikram Bista
- Original title: ज्योति ज्योति महाज्योति
- Language: Nepali
- Genre: Social realism
- Published: 1988
- Publisher: Royal Nepal Academy
- Publication place: Nepal
- Media type: Print (Paperback)
- Pages: 512
- Award: Madan Puraskar, 2045 BS (1988 CE)
- ISBN: 9789937320580

Jyoti Jyoti Mahajyoti (Nepali: ज्योति ज्योति महाज्योति, lit. 'Light of the lights') is a 1988 Nepali novel by Daulat Bikram Bista. It was published in 1988 by Nepal Rajakiya Pragya Prakashan (Royal Nepal Academy). The book received the Madan Puraskar in the same year. It is the seventh novel of the author.

== Synopsis ==
It is a social realist novel that depicts story, pain, lifestyle, lifestyle etc. of the people in and around Pashupati region. It seeks to eradicate social inequality, anomalies, superstitions, customs and superstitions in the name of religion.

== Reception ==
The book received the prestigious Madan Puraskar for 2045 BS (1988).

== See also ==
- Madhabi
- Shirishko Phool
- Alikhit
