= Sharada (magazine) =

Nepali literary magazine

- First editor: Riddhi Bahadur Malla
- Categories: Literary magazine
- Frequency: Monthly
- Format: Print
- Founder: Subba Riddhi Bahadur Malla
- First issue: 1934
- Country: Nepal
- Based in: Kathmandu
- Language: Nepali

Sharda (Nepali: शारदा) was a monthly Nepali literary magazine from Nepal. It was one of the most popular and renowned literary magazines.

== Background ==
Sharada was one of the most important Nepali literary magazines. Many Nepali writers have started their careers by publishing their writings in this magazine. The role of Sharada magazine was remarkable in the romantic period of Nepali literature. This magazine used to publish works of all genres of modern literature. Sharada magazine played the first role in introducing modernity in Nepali literature. The writings of many popular writers used to be published in the magazines among them were Laxmi Prasad Devkota, Balakrishna Sama, Lekhnath Poudyal, Siddhicharan Shrestha, Ram Krishna Sharma, Hriday Chandra Singh Pradhan, Bhawani Bhikshu, Pushkar Shamsher, Bishweshwar Prasad Koirala and Shiva Kumar Rai.

Sharada kala (Sharada era) is a popular term for the era during which Nepali poetry flourished. Siddhicharan Shrestha, Kedar Man Vyathit and Gopal Prasad Rimal were among the most popular poets during that era.

== History ==
Sharada was started by Subba Riddhi Bahadur Malla in March 1934. It was the first registered newspaper/ magazine in Nepal under the 1994 BS Act. Malla also served as the editor of the magazine. Due to the strict censorship during the Rana regime, the magazine faced multiple obstacles. The writings needed to be attested by the censorship department of Nepali Language Publication Committee. Several times, the articles, stories and poems had to be edited in compliance with the government, which frustrated the writers.

The publication of the magazine was regular from 1934 to 1943. For some years after 19, the publication became irregular. The magazine again ran smoothly between 1947 and 1949 but started to decline slowly. It was closed in 1962 due to lack of funding.

== Revival and closure ==
The magazine was revived under the editorship of Bimal Bhaukaji, but soon closed.

== See also ==
- Dharmodaya
- Gorkhapatra
- Kantipur
- Ruprekha
- Moti Laxmi Upasika
