= Binod Prasad Dhital =

Nepali author

- विनोदप्रसाद धिताल
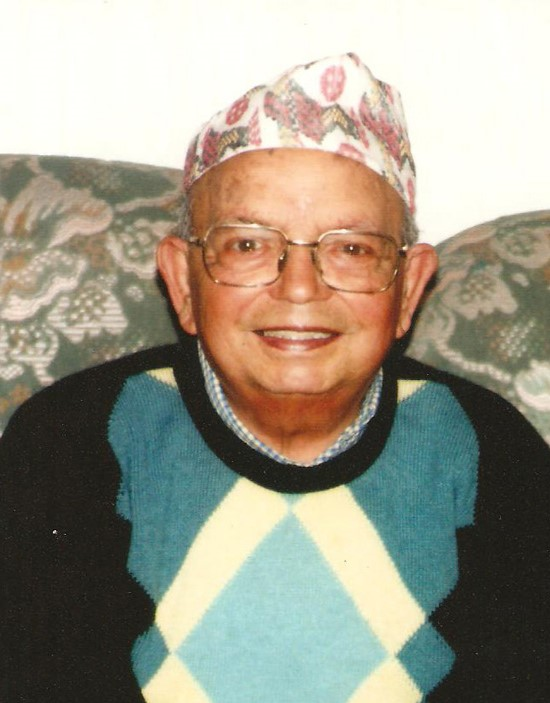
- Born: 10 June 1923; Tripureshwor, Kathmandu, Nepal
- Died: 16 August 2007 (aged 84)
- Occupations: Poet, novelist, playwright, Law secretary
- Notable work: Yojana Gandha
- Spouse: Gopabala Dhital
- Parents: Bhairab Prasad Dhital (father); Hutasan Kumari (mother)
- Awards: Madan Puraskar; Sajha Puraskar

Binod Prasad Dhital (1923–2007) was a poet and novelist from Nepal. He is best known for his mythological novel Yojana Gandha, for which he was awarded the Madan Puraskar and Sajha Puraskar in 1995.

== Biography ==
Dhital was born in Tripureshwor, Kathmandu, Nepal, to Bhairab Prasad Dhital and Hutasan Kumari on 10 June 1923, and died on 16 August 2007. He belonged to the generation that helped shape Nepal’s transition from an autocratic feudal society towards a more modern state. Steeped in Nepal’s liberal Hindu tradition, he was widely respected as an open-minded and progressive thinker whose contributions to legal reform and award winning literary works have left a lasting mark on Nepal intellectual and public life.

Raised in a remote Kharibot Bhanjyang village, in the mountainous region of Gorkha district, Nepal, during Rana regime, Dhital witnessed first-hand the grinding poverty, pervasive social inequalities and, caste and gender discriminations that shaped his life-long commitment to reform. After studying at Durbar High School in Kathmandu, earning a master’s degree in India and a law degree in Nepal, he joined civil service in 1951 as Assistant Secretary of Education at the age of twenty nine in the Nepali Congress-Rana coalition government. Recognized as an able administrator, he rose rapidly through the civil service, serving successfully as senior Project Officer of the strategically important Koshi Project, under Secretary of the Public Service Commission, joint secretary of Law and Justice, Secretary of Law and Justice and Information and Communications. All within the span of fifteen years.

During that period he was also appointed chairman of Gorkhapatra Sansthan, the state- owned media organization, and Rastriya Samachar Samiti, the state – owned news agency. It was during his tenure as chairman of Gorkhapatra Sansthan that he initiated the publication of The Rising Nepal, the English daily. He was also privileged to submit respectfully the first issue of it to then crown prince Birendra Bir Bikram Shah.

Also he was instrumental in the production of the first Nepali film Ama (Mother) and put it on show. The film, though aimed at arousing the feelings of nationality, was intended to lay the foundations for Nepali film industry.

During his fifteen years in government, Dhital became associated with a series of important institutional reforms. He introduced many new reformation rules for civil service recruitment, helping to replace patronage with merit-based selection, and advocated more transparent procedures for judicial appointments. Most significantly, as chairman of the Law Commission, he led the first major revision of Nepal’s Muluki Ain (National legal code), introducing reforms that abolished legal discrimination based on caste, outlawed untouchability and polygamy and removed several other discriminatory provisions. He also contributed to the Land Reform Act of 1962, one of the landmark social reforms of the Panchayat era. He was awarded the Prasidda Prabal Gorkha Dachhin Bahu second class medal by King Mahendra for his outstanding performance as a civil servant.

If administration was Dhital’s profession, literature was his passion. From a young age, he wrote constantly on different genres of literature. His first poem Kohili was published in Sharada, the first literary magazine of Nepal, while he was still in school. Most of his poems, essays, criticisms, reviews and articles have been published in the leading Nepali literary journals like Sharada, Himani, Udaya, Ruprekha, Garima, Madhupark etc and also in international journals. Besides his native Nepali, Dhital was proficient in Sanskrit, Hindi, and English. A prolific writer he produced poetry, novels, essays, and translation, earning recognition as one of the Nepal’s distinguished literary figures.

Dhital’s literary interests extended well beyond Nepali and Sanskrit traditions. He was an avid reader of world literature, particularly the works of Albert Camus, Fyodor Dostoevsky, and Gabriel Garcia Marquez, whose One Hundred Years of Solitude was among the books he greatly admired.

Alongside his literary pursuits, Dhital devoted himself to the study of Hindu religion and philosophy. He possessed an extensive knowledge of the Hindu scriptures. He was particularly devoted to the teachings of Shirdi Sai Baba and Satya Sai Baba, whose inclusive interpretation of spirituality emphasized the essential unity of all religions.

== Works ==
Dhital wrote poetry and novels, and translated several works into Nepali.

- Radha Milan (2013 BS) – a khandakavya (short narrative poem) based on the Mahabharata, portraying the love of Radha and Krishna. It was his first published book.
- Acharya Bishnugupta Chanakya (2022 BS) – a Nepali translation of Satyaketu Vidyalankar's Hindi novel Acharya Vishnugupta Chanakya (1964).
- Ujyalo Hunu Aghi (2028 BS) – a regional novel set in a village in Gorkha District, dealing with caste discrimination, inter-caste marriage and the land reforms of the Panchayat era. It was published by Sajha Prakashan.
- Divine Comedy (2040 BS) – a Nepali verse translation of Dante Alighieri's Divine Comedy.
- Yojana Gandha (2052 BS) – a novel based on the story of Satyavati from the Mahabharata. It won the Madan Puraskar and the Sajha Puraskar,
- Astauna Lageka Chandramasanga (2058 BS) – a collection of poems written over different periods of his life.
- Shri Sai Satcharitra (2009) – a Nepali translation of Shri Sai Satcharitra, Govind Raghunath Dabholkar's Marathi biography of Sai Baba of Shirdi, published by the Shri Saibaba Sansthan Trust, Shirdi.

== Awards ==
- Madan Puraskar (1995)
- Sajha Puraskar (1995)
- Prasiddha Prabal Gorkha Dakshin Bahu (1962)
