= Bhimsen Ko Antya =

Nepali play by Balkrishna Sama

- Cover page
- Author: Balkrishna Sama
- Original title: भीमसेनको अन्त्य
- Language: Nepali
- Subject: Bhimsen Thapa's fall
- Genre: Historical play
- Published: 1972
- Publisher: Sajha Prakashan
- Publication place: Nepal
- Media type: Print
- Pages: 128
- ISBN: 9789993326076

Bhimsen Ko Antya (Nepali: भीमसेनको अन्त्य, lit. 'Fall of Bhimsen') is a Nepali play by Balkrishna Sama. It was published in 1972 by Sajha Prakashan. Sama is considered as one of the most foremost Nepalese playwright. He was awarded with the title Natya Siromani (Crest jewel of playwright). He received the prestigious Sajha Puraskar for this work.

== Synopsis ==
The play is divided into eight acts. The book is based on the later life of the first prime minister of modern Nepal, Bhimsen Thapa. The end days of Thapa consisted of lots of struggle. He was falsely imprisoned by various conspiracies by the other courtiers in the Durbar.

== Reception ==
The book was awarded with the Sajha Puraskar for 2029 BS (c. 1972-1973). The award is given every year to the best book published by the publication within that year. It was the first play to win the award.

== See also ==
- Baikuntha Express
- Prem Pinda
- Yajnaseni
