= Pretkalpa =

2007 Nepalese novel

- Cover page of the book
- Author: Narayan Dhakal
- Original title: प्रेतकल्प
- Language: Nepali
- Genre: Fiction
- Published: 2007
- Publisher: Sajha Prakashan
- Publication date: 2007
- Publication place: Nepal
- Pages: 223
- Award: Sajha Puraskar, 2065 BS (2008–2009)
- ISBN: 9789993329107
- OCLC: 1102164918

Pretkalpa (Nepali: प्रेतकल्प) is a 2007 Nepali historical fiction novel by Narayan Dhakal. It was published in 2007 by Sajha Prakashan and won the Sajha Puraskar, 2065 BS (2008–2009). The novels depicts the life of people of a town in the Kanth (Nepali: काँठ, outskirts of Kathmandu) during the early 20th century.

== Synopsis ==
The novel is set in a fictional place called Dukhapur, located in the northeastern region of Kathmandu. It set during the reign of Chandra Shumsher JBR. The book shows the difficulties of common people under the autocratic Rana rule and the feudalistic society.

It is a story of family, social, cultural and political upheaval and conflict when a young man returns to the village after completing his education and trying to use his knowledge to uplift the societal norms and values. The book not only tells the story of that era but also the various evil practices and customs that exists till date. It also provides information on the ideological battle between the 'Puranavadi' and 'Vedavadi' schools of Hindu philosophy and its social impact.

== Characters ==
- Acharya Balkrishna, a 19-year-old guy who had returned from Benaras after studying Sanskrit. He is influenced by the progressive ideas of Dayananda Saraswati and wants to bring changes to his village.
- Acharya Ramkrishna, father of Balkrishna, a priest.
- Mannodari, Balkrishna's mother
- Jimbal Bishnubhakta, a villager and well wisher of Balkrishna's family. Bishnubhakta also works as the informer and tax collector of Dukhapur for Chandra Shumsher.
- Rambhakta, Bishnubhakta's son and Balkrishna's childhood friend
- Chandra Shumsher JBR, incumbent Prime minister of Nepal
- Padma Shumsher JBR
- Baber Shumsher JBR
- Kaiser Shumsher JBR
- Damyanti, a young widow who lives in the frills of Dukhapur. Also, the love interest of Balkrishna
- Subhadra, Damyanti's mother-in-law
- Hanumane (Ashwini), a Dalit Sarki boy from Naikap village. The boy is separated from his father during the coronation of King Tribhuvan and found by Bishnubhakta. The boy is raised by Balkrishna in his house and renamed as Ashwini.
- Shankhadar, the nemesis of Balkrishna's and Bishnubhakta's family.
- Chakradhar, Shankhadar's father and a jyotish
- Rajaram, Balkrishna's companion in prison.

== Reception ==
The book won the Sajha Puraskar in 2007. The award is presented to best book published within Sajha Publication.

== See also ==
- Seto Dharti
- Radha
- Palpasa Cafe
- Karnali Blues
