= Riddhi Bahadur Malla =

Nepalese writer (1898–1968)

Subba Riddhi Bahadur Malla
- ऋद्धिबहादुर मल्ल
- Portrait
- Born: 8 December 1898; Benaras, British India
- Died: 1968 (aged 69–70); Kathmandu, Nepal
- Known for: Editor of Sharada
- Spouse: Ananda Maya
- Children: Govinda Bahadur Malla (son); Bijaya Malla (son)

Subba Riddhi Bahadur Malla (Nepali: ऋद्धिबहादुर मल्ल; 1898–1968) was a Nepali writer.

Malla was born on 8 December 1898 in Benaras, British India. His sons, Govinda Bahadur Malla and Bijaya Malla are also renowned writers. He founded Sharada, a Nepali-language magazine during the Rana-era.

== Works ==
- Sharmistha. Manjari Publication. ISBN 9789937712453.

== See also ==
- Bhawani Bhikshu
- Lekhnath Paudyal
- Laxmi Prasad Devkota
