= Govinda Bahadur Malla =

Writer of Nepal

Govinda Bahadur Malla Gothale
- गोविन्द बहादुर मल्ल “गोठाले”
- Born: 12 July 1922; Kathmandu, Nepal
- Died: 13 December 2010 (aged 88); Kathmandu
- Occupations: Writer, playwright
- Relatives: Ananda Maya (mother); Riddhi Bahadur Malla (father); Bijaya Malla (brother)
- Awards: Jagadamba Shree Puraskar

Govinda Bahadur Malla “Gothale“ (Nepali:गोविन्द बहादुर मल्ल “गोठाले”; 1922–2010) was a writer of Nepal. He is best known for his novel Pallo Gharko Jhyal. He was awarded Jagadamba Shree Puraskar in 2055 BS (c. 1999) for his contribution to Nepalese literature.

== Biography ==
He was born on 12 July 1922 (29 Ashadh 1979 BS) to father Riddhi Bahadur Malla and mother Ananda Maya Malla in Kathmandu. He was schooled in Benaras, India followed by Durbar High School and Tri-Chandra College. He studied up to I.Sc. His works have been awarded multiple times. Some of his works also form part of the curriculum in Nepali schools. He stopped writing after 1964. His brother Bijaya Malla is also a writer.

== Works ==
Mamata, a collection of poems, written in 1992 BS was his first publication. The most popular work of Malla is Pallo Ghar ko Jhyal, a novel. Malla has written numerous novels, stories and plays. Some of them are:

- Gothaleko Kahta Sangraha (Nepali: गोठालेका कथा संग्रह)
- Pallo Gharko Jhyal (Nepali: पल्लो घरको झ्याल, lit. 'The Window of the House Opposite'; Novel, 2016 BS)
- Prem ra Mrityu (Nepali: प्रेम र मृत्यु, lit. 'Love and death')
- Kathai Kahta (Nepali: कथैकथा; Short stories, 2016 BS)
- Bhus ko Aago (Nepali: भुसको आगो; Play,2013 BS)
- Bhoko Ghar (Nepali: भोको घर, lit. 'Hungry home'; Essays, 2034 BS)
- Chaytiyeko Parda (Nepali: च्यातिएको पर्दा, lit. 'Torn curtains'; Play, 2016 BS)
- Dosh Kasko Chaina (Nepali: दोष कसको छैन; Play, 2027 BS)
- Barha Katha (Nepali: बाह्रकथा, romanized: Twelve stories; Short stories, 2052 BS)
- Arpana (Nepali: अपर्णा;Novel, 2053 BS)
- Piyanani (Nepali: पियानानी; Novel, 2056 BS)

== Awards ==
- Jagadamba Shree Purasakar (2055 BS)
- Nepal Rajkiya Pragya Pratisthan Manartha Sadasya, (2033 BS)
- Gorkha Dakshin Bahu Award, Second Class (2036 BS)
- Tribhuwan Pragya Award(2043 BS)
- Bhawani Sahityik Patrakarita Award (2045 BS)
- Bed Nidhi Award (2049 BS)
- Sarwashrestha Rachana Awards (2050 BS)
- Pahalman Singh Swar Award (2052 BS)
- Sarawshrestha Pandulipi Award (2053 BS)
- Shanti Puraskar (2054 BS)
