= Janaklal Sharma =

Nepalese Author

Janaklal Sharma is a Nepalese author. He was born in Ilam District in 1983 BS Baishakh 17. He won Madan Puraskar in the 2020 BS for the book Josmani Santa Parampara ra Sahitya (जोसमनी सन्त परम्परा र साहित्य). He has also won Sajha Puraskar in 2042 BS for the book Hamro Samaj: Ek Adhyan (हाम्रो समाज: एक अध्ययन). He is the author of numerous books on Nepalese literature, arts, culture, travel etc.

He is an honorary member of the Nepal Academy. Sharma was the director general and the editor of the journal Ancient Nepal (प्राचिन नेपाल) of the Department of Archaeology, Nepal.
