= Daulat Bikram Bista =

Nepali writer (1925- 2002)

- दौलत विक्रम विष्ठ
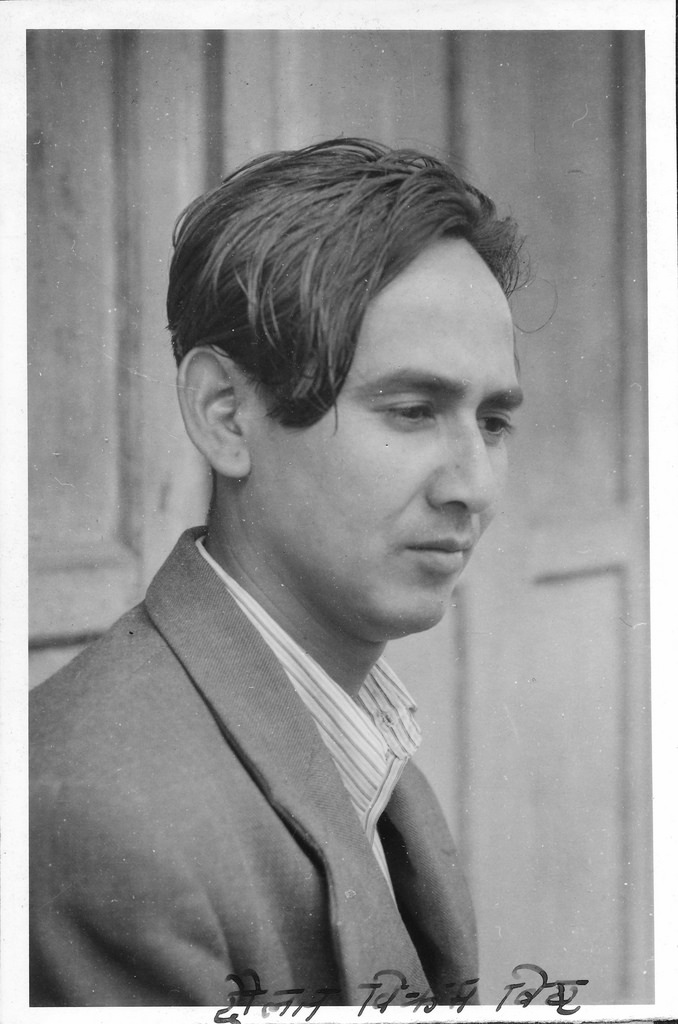
- Born: 9 October 1925; Bhojpur, Nepal
- Died: 1 January 2002 (aged 76); Nepal
- Education: Aligarh Muslim University
- Occupation: Writer
- Notable work: Jyoti Jyoti Mahajyoti; Chapaieka Anuhar
- Children: 6 (Om Bikram Bista and 5 others)
- Parents: Somraj Bista (father); Man Kumari Bista (mother)
- Awards: Madan Puraskar, Sajha Puraskar

Daulat Bikram Bista (Nepali:दौलत विक्रम विष्ठ) was a writer and poet of Nepali literature. He was born on 9 October 1925 (6 Ashoj 1983 B.S.) in Bhojpur and died on 1 January 2002. His writing dealt with social issues, mainly the exploitation and discrimination of the poor and downtrodden.

== Early life and education ==
Bista was born as the first son to father Somraj Bista and mother Man Kumari Bista. His ancestral house was in Lamjung but his father had migrated to Kathmandu before he was born to get a government job. Bista was born in Bhojpur district due to his father's transfer there. His family lived in various cities during his upbringing as his father travelled often for work. Bista's mother died in 1996, after which his father remarried.

Due to the travelling nature of his father's job, Bista studied in various schools in different parts of Nepal. He studied at Gurukul in Salyan, Goswara Munsi in Jhapa, government schools in Jhapa, and Durbar High School in Kathmandu.

He completed high school in 2004 BS (1947–1948) and received his B.A. and B.Ed. from Tribhuwan University. He also completed his master's degree at Aligarh University in India as a private student.

== Works ==
His first novel Manjari was published in 2015 BS (1958–1959). It is a social novel based on the changes brought by the 1951 revolution. Manjari reveals the social and cultural outlook and practices of that time.

His second novel Ek Paluwa Anekau Yam is fiction and considered to have more of a novel quality.

The Bhok ra Bhittaharu, published in 2038 BS, is considered to be a mixture of comedy, sentiment, emotion and the relationship of father and daughter.

Other major works of Bista are:

- Chapaieka Anuhar (Emaciated Faces)
- Jyoti Jyoti Mahajyoti (1988; Light of Lights)
- Thakeko Akash ( An Exhausted Sky)
- Bigriyeko Bato (Spoiled Path)
- Aansu Tyasai Tyasai Chhachalkinchha
- Bhok Ra Bhittaharu (Hunger and Walls)
- Baluwa Mathi ( On The Sand)
- Himal Ra Manche (Himalaya And A Man)
- Phansiko Phandama

== Awards ==
Bista received various awards for his writings by the government and non-government organizations. Some notable ones are listed below:

- He was the first awardee of Mahendra Pragya Puraskar in 2030 BS (1973–1974) for his novel Chapaiyeka Anuharharu
- Madan Puraskar in 2045 BS (1988–1989) for his novel Jyoti Jyoti Mahajyoti
- Sajha Puraskar for Aansu Tyasai Tyasai Chhachalkinchha
- Tri Shakti Patta
- Order of Gorkha Dakshina Bahu - Fourth.
- Jansewa Padak
- Durgam Sewa Padak

== Personal life ==
Bista was wed at the age of 19 to Lichu, daughter of Premlal Pandey. She gave birth in the first three months of marriage, which led to an informal divorce. Later Bista married Nutan Kumari (daughter of Bhaktaman Basnet). He had six children, four sons and two daughters. The sons are Shree Bikram, Om Bikram, Kailah Bikram and Ananta Bikram. His daughters are Indira and Niru.

His wife died in 2054 BS (1997–1998) which led to a difficult life for him. He died in 28 December 2002 (13 Poush 2059 BS).
