= Sanu Sharma =

Nepalese writer

- सानु शर्मा
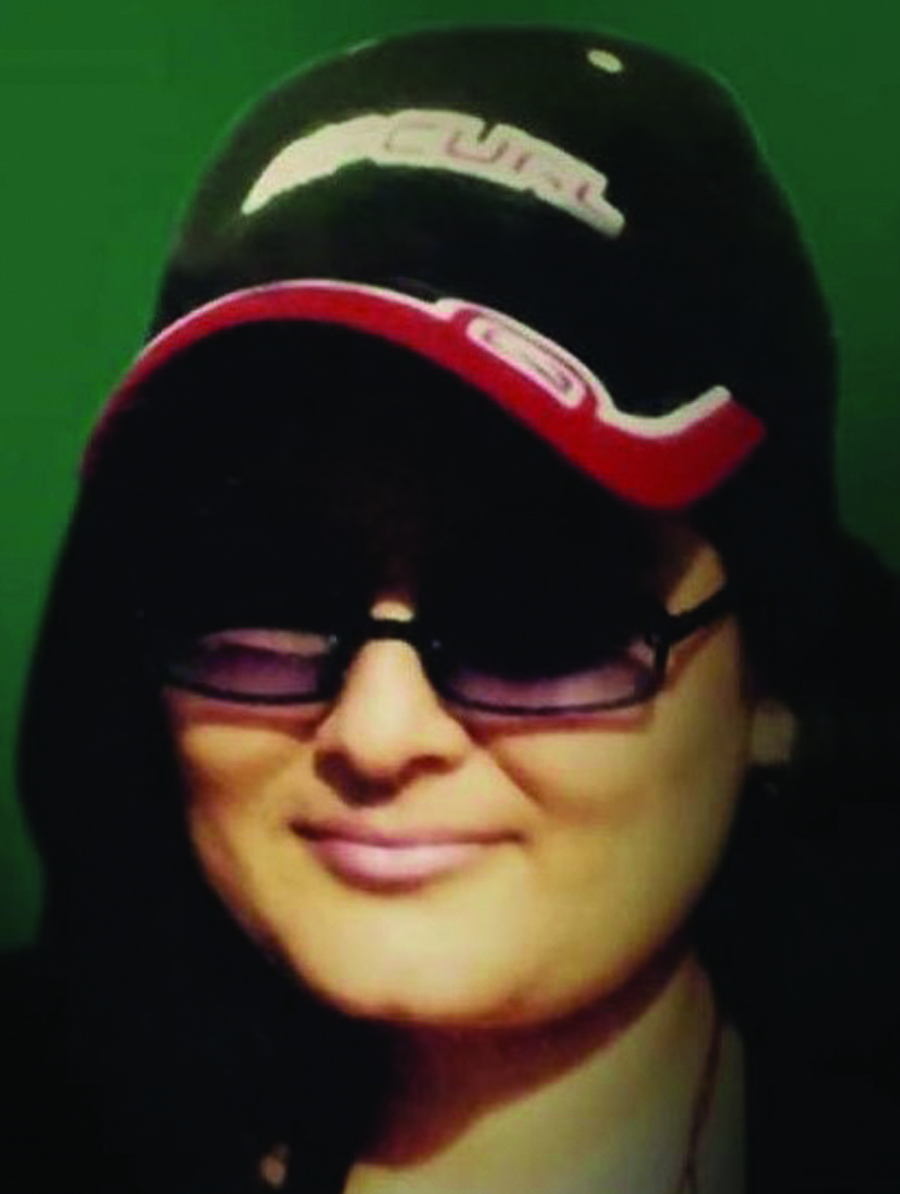
- Novelist Sanu Sharma
- Born: Kathmandu, Nepal
- Occupations: writer, novelist, poet, nurse
- Notable work: Sankalpini; Arko Deshma; Utsarga; Ekadeshma; Biplavi; Artha

Sanu Sharma (Nepali: सानु शर्मा) is a Nepali novelist, short story writer, poet, and lyricist. She has published novels, short stories, and poetry, many of which have also been released as audiobooks. Her works have been translated into English, Portuguese, Spanish, Russian and Hindi, with translations appearing in literary journals and magazines in several countries.

In 2018, Sharma’s short story collection Ekadeshmaa was among the seven books shortlisted for the Madan Puraskar award. In 2024, her ninth book, Arko Deshma, was shortlisted for both the Padmashree Award and the Kavidanda Literary Award.

== Early life ==
Sanu Sharma was born in Prasuti Ghriha, a governmental maternity hospital in Kathmandu. She spent her childhood in Kathmandu and in the hill and Terai regions of Nepal.

== Career ==
Sharma's first novel, Ardhaviram, was published in 2003, followed by Jeetko Paribhasha in 2010 and Artha in 2011.

In 2017, Sharma published her fourth novel, Biplavi. The following year, she released her first short story collection, Ekadeshmaa. The collection brought her wider recognition among readers and critics and was shortlisted for the Madan Puraskar, one of Nepal's leading literary awards.

Sharma published her fifth novel, Utsarga, in 2021, followed by her sixth novel, Pharak, in 2022. In September 2023, she published her seventh novel, Tee Saat Din, through Ratna Pustak Bhandar, her eighth book overall. In April 2024, she published her second short story collection, Arko Deshma, through FinePrint, her ninth book. In May 2026, she published her eighth novel and tenth book overall, Sankalpini, through Sangrila Books.

Sanu Sharma has also written poetry, lyrics, and ghazals. Some of her ghazals are included in the collaborative anthology Kaifiyat II. Her lyrics have been recorded by Nepali singers and set to music by several composers. Her poems have been published in Nepali as well as in English, Spanish, Portuguese, Russian and Hindi translation in literary journals and magazines in several countries.

== Writing ==
Critics have noted Sharma's writing for its psychological focus, female protagonists, and exploration of social issues.

In addition to her books, her short stories, poems, and serialized novels have appeared in literary magazines and journals. Her lyrics have also been recorded by Nepali singers.

Recurring themes in her fiction include gender, identity, and contemporary Nepali society, while her poetry and lyrics frequently explore love, longing, and loss.

=== Novels ===
Sharma's debut novel, Ardhabiram, depicts the life of a woman trapped in an unhappy marriage and examines the emotional consequences for her family, particularly her child. The novel concludes on a hopeful note, emphasizing recovery and resilience.

Her third novel, Artha, follows Jiya, a young woman who assumes responsibility for her family after her father's death. Adopting the name Jiyakant, she challenges conventional gender roles while seeking independence and personal fulfilment.

Biplavi centres on Sasha, a woman from a privileged background whose marriage exposes the constraints imposed by patriarchal social norms. The novel addresses issues including gender inequality, class differences, domestic abuse, and personal autonomy. Literary critics have also interpreted the novel through the lens of gender theory, highlighting its portrayal of women's resistance to social injustice.

In Utsarga, Sharma tells the story of Arya, a girl growing up in Nepal after being left behind by parents working abroad. Written in the first person, the novel explores loneliness, identity, and the emotional impact of parental migration.

Pharak follows the relationship between Pratyush, a wealthy man facing a personal crisis, and Bini, a sex worker portrayed with dignity and complexity. The novel questions conventional moral judgments by emphasizing character and conduct over social status.

Tee Saat Din examines the impact of rape on survivors and those around them, focusing on its emotional and social consequences rather than sensationalism. Written in a contemporary style, the novel also explores friendship, family relationships, trauma, and emotional resilience in the digital age.

Sankalpini, published in 2026, centres on questions of human psychology, adolescence, and personal resolve. The novel combines realistic and imagined settings while exploring interpersonal relationships and individual identity.

=== Short stories ===
In addition to her novels, Sharma has written numerous short stories, many of which have appeared in literary journals before being collected in book form.

Her first short story collection, Ekadeshma (2018), explores themes including women's experiences, family relationships, and social expectations. According to critic Ramji Timsina, stories such as Bhaauju and Chot stand out for their language and narrative structure, while the collection as a whole examines women's agency within a patriarchal society.

Her second collection, Arko Deshma (2024), contains stories including Sauta, Lockdown, Pari, Nayaa Mod, and Bakainako Bot. The collection focuses on human relationships and contemporary social life through a range of settings and characters. Reviews have noted its restrained narrative style and its preference for presenting situations without explicit moral conclusions.

=== Poetry ===
Besides fiction, Sharma has written poetry in Nepali, with a number of poems translated into English, Portuguese, Spanish, Russian and Hindi and published in international literary journals and magazines.

Recurring themes in her poetry include love, longing, memory, loss, and personal reflection. Poems such as The Heart, A Heart It Is, Fear of Serenity, May I Meet You Someday Like This, Desire, Me and My Life, and The Descendants explore interpersonal relationships, emotional experience, and personal change.

== Works ==
Novels

- Ardhaviram 2003
- Jeetko Paribhasha 2010
- Artha 2011
- Biplavi 2017
- Utsarga 2021
- Pharak 2022
- Tee Saat Din 2023
- Sankalpini 2026

Short story collections

- Ekadeshmaa 2018
- Arko Deshma 2024

Collaborative collection of Ghazals

- Kaifiyat II
