= Ghumne Mechmathi Andho Manche =

1968 Book by Bhupi Sherchan

- Author: Bhupi Sherchan
- Original title: घुम्ने मेचमाथि अन्धो मान्छे
- Language: Nepali
- Genre: Poetry
- Publisher: Sajha Prakashan
- Publication date: 1969
- Publication place: Nepal
- Pages: 88
- ISBN: 9789993326472

Ghumne Mechmathi Andho Manche (Nepali: घुम्ने मेचमाथि अन्धो मान्छे)(in English, "A blind man on a spinning table") is a 1969 Nepali-language poetry collection by Bhupi Sherchan. It was published by Sajha Prakashan and won the first ever Sajha Puraskar for the year 2025 BS (1969).

== Background ==
The poems were first published as individual short poems over time, on periodicals like Ruprekha. The poems are highly informed by national and international political and social issues of the time, and are interpreted as protest literature.

== Reception ==
It is considered the poet's magnum opus and argued to be on par with Muna Madan by Laxmi Prasad Devkota and Madhav Prasad Ghimire's Gauri. Prominent critic Taranath Sharma, litterateur Basu Rimal Yatri, Yadu Nath Khanal, and Hiramani Sharma Paudyal, were among the critics who published positive reviews on the work.

The book was awarded with the Sajha Puraskar by Sajha Prakashan in 2026 BS.

== Adaptation ==
The title of 2022 Nepali film, Chiso Ashtray is based on one of the poem from the collection.

== See also ==
- Muna Madan
- Abstract Chintan Pyaj
- Shirishko Phool
