= Chhetrapati =

Neighborhood in Kathmandu, Nepal

Chhetrapati क्षेत्रपाटी
- Neighborhood
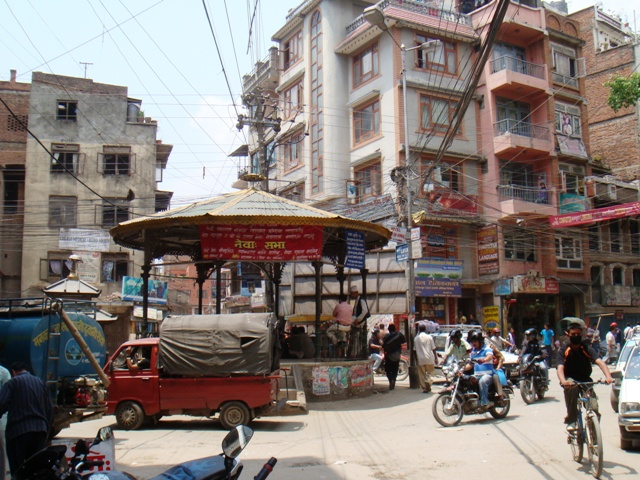
- Interactive map of Chhetrapati
- Coordinates: 27°42′41.55″N 85°18′31.78″E
- Country: Nepal
- Province: Bāgmatī
- District: Kathmandu
- City: Kathmandu

Chhetrapati (Nepali: क्षेत्रपाटी) is a settlement at the old part of Kathmandu city lying between Thamel, Asan and Kathmandu Durbar Square. Six streets merge at the Chettrapati chowk coming from Thamel, Sorrakhutte, Dhobichour, Asan, Dallu and Basantapur. There is an ancient roundabout at the center of Chettrapati chowk. It is one of the major route for celebration of Indra Jatra.
