= Samasya-purti =

Samasya-purti (Devanagari : समस्या-पूर्ति / literally satisfaction of a problem) is a class of Indian literature, specially popular in Sanskrit, but also known in other languages.

In Samasya-purti, the problem is posed by providing part of a metrical composition. The challenge is to compose the rest of the composition.

Some scholars have taken the last line of each verse of Kalidasa's Meghadutam as the samasya, and have composed the rest.

== See also ==
- Sanskrit literature
- Indian literature
- Early Medieval literature
