= Madan Mani Dixit =

Nepalese journalist and writer (1923–2019)

- मदनमणि दीक्षित
- Born: 17 February 1923; Gairidhara, Kathmandu
- Died: 15 August 2019 (aged 96); Gyaneshwor, Kathmandu
- Education: Bachelor's degree in Hindu Philosophy and Religion from Banaras Hindu University
- Occupations: Writer, Journalist
- Notable work: Madhabi, Meri Nilima
- Spouse: Rita Dixit
- Children: 5
- Parent(s): Bishukumari Acharya (Mother); Laxmanmani Acharya Dixit (Father)
- Awards: Madan Puraskar, Sajha Puraskar, Adikavi Bhanubhakta Puraskar

Madan Mani Dixit (17 February 1923 – 15 August 2019) was a Nepalese writer, journalist and novelist. His novel Madhabi is considered a classic in Nepali literature. He received the prestigious Madan Puraskar and Sajha Puraskar for the novel.

== Early life and education ==
He was born on 17 February 1923, in Kathmandu. He grew up in one of the most powerful families in Kathmandu. Madan Mani's father and grandfather held diplomatic positions during the rule of the Ranas. Madan Mani studied, from the age of eight, religious literature such as the Ramayana in Sanskrit. He was educated at Banaras Hindu University in India.

== Career ==
He started his career as a Headmaster at TriJuddha High School, Birgunj. From 1958 to 1960 he worked as an editor for Haal Khabar, a weekly newspaper. He was also the chief editor of Samichya, his own newspaper.

Madan Mani Dixit wrote with clear perspectives in mind. He drew from past experiences of his study of Sanskrit, philosophy, and history to write stories and novels flavored with scholastic insights. He believed that the most important aspect of story writing was not the style one writes in, but the feelings one is able to convey. One should be able to create an atmosphere suited to the period depicted.

In 1960, he was part of a parliamentary delegation to the Soviet Union, representing the journalistic sector of Nepal. He worked for thirty-three years for the Nepal Communist party. He also served as vice chancellor of the Royal Nepal Academy (1994–1999).

His most famous works included the novels Madhavi, Meri Nilima, Bhumisukta, and the short story Kasle jityo kasle haryo?. Madan Mani Dixit received various honors and awards, including the Madan Puraskar and the Adikavi Bhanubhakta Puraskar.

== Death ==
Dixit died on 15 August 2019, aged 96.

== See also ==
- Dhanush Chandra Gautam
- Bhawani Bhikshu
- Parijat
- Gopal Prasad Rimal
- Hridaya Chandra Singh Pradhan
- Taranath Sharma
- Madhav Prasad Ghimire
