= Chautari =

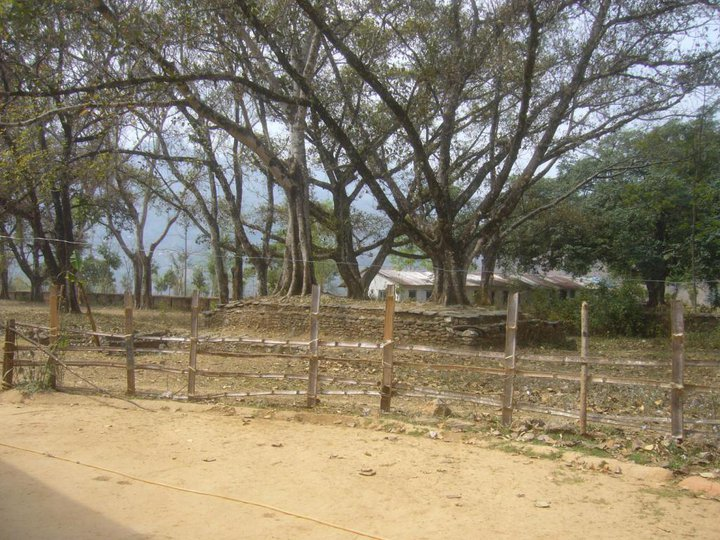
A chautari located at Phalebas village of Nepal

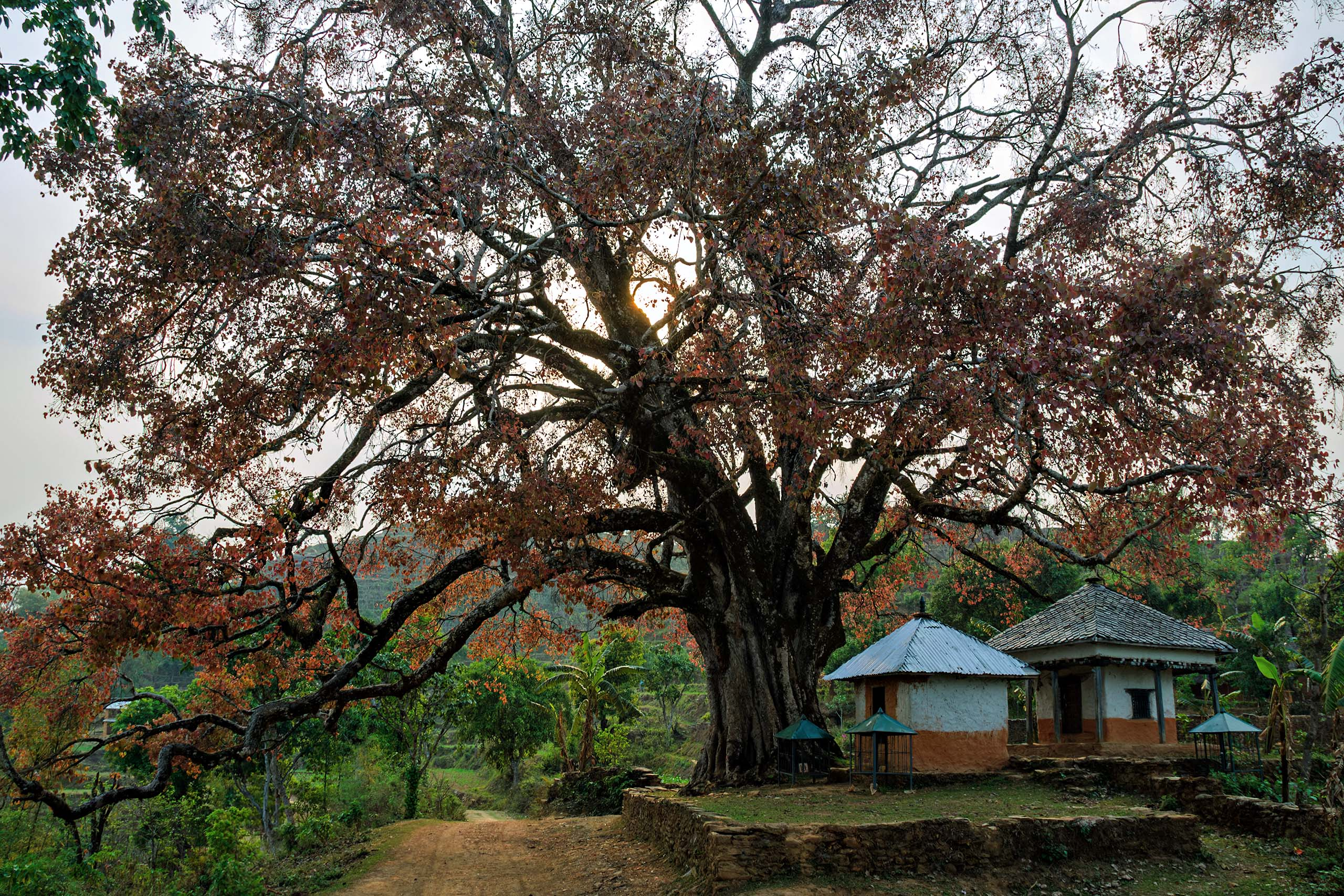
Chautari traditional resting place under a huge old tree, Nalang, Nepal

A chautari (चौतारी) is a rest stop usually found along the foot trails of rural Nepal. They are usually made by piling stones to create a platform and usually have a banyan or peepal (Ficus religiosa) tree, or both, planted to provide shade. The primary aim of a chautari is to provide a brief rest stop to travelers hiking along the trail. However, in a village, they also provide a place for social gatherings after a day of work.
