= Abstract Chintan Pyaj =

Book by Shankar Lamichhane

- Cover page of the seventh edition of the book
- Author: Shankar Lamichhane
- Original title: एब्स्ट्राक्ट चिन्तन : प्याज
- Language: Nepali
- Genre: Essay
- Publisher: Sajha Prakashan
- Publication date: 1967
- Publication place: Nepal
- Media type: Book
- Pages: 84
- ISBN: 9789993326731
- OCLC: 965145092

Abstract Chintan Pyaj (Nepali: एब्स्ट्र्याक्ट चिन्तन प्याज) is a 1967 Nepali essay collection by Shankar Lamichhane. This book won the Madan Puraskar for the year 2024 BS (1967).

== Synopsis ==
It is an anthologies of essays and in the titular essay, an onion is used as a metaphor in this essay to describe the sequential removal of the layers that conceal a greater something. Our life is a bulb of onion and the different layers are the different stages and incidents of our life.

== Reception ==
The book won the Madan Puraskar, 2024 BS (1967).

== See also ==
- Shirishko Phool
- Ghumne Mechmathi Andho Manche
