= Pinjada Ko Suga =

Nepali poem

- by Lekhnath Paudyal
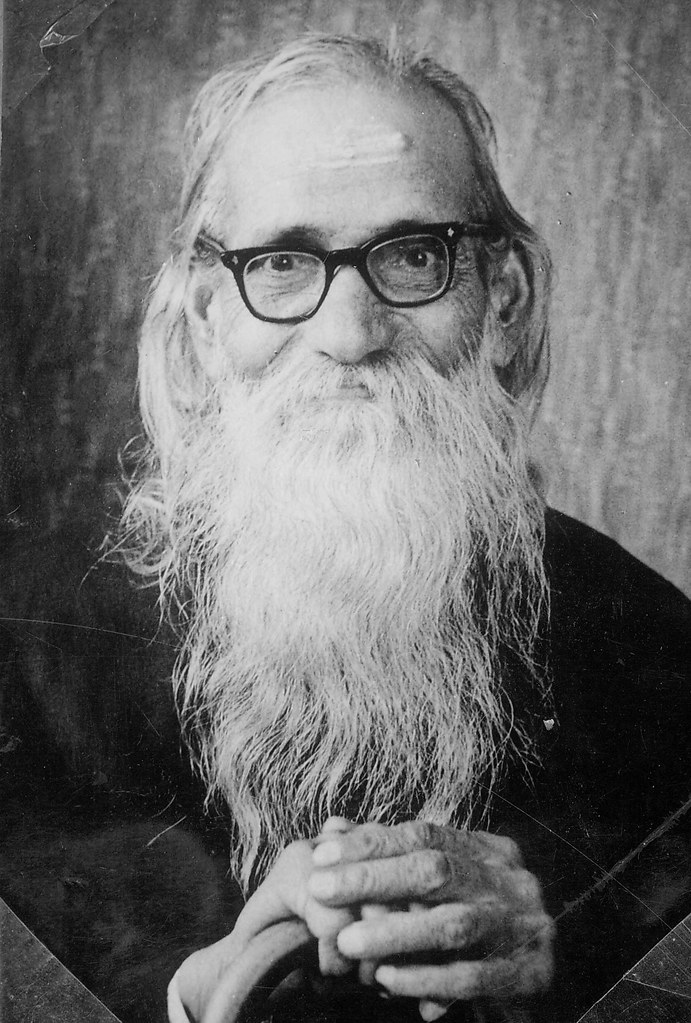
- Lekhnath Paudyal
- Original title: पिंजडाको सुगा
- Country: Nepal
- Language: Nepali
- Subject(s): A parrot
- Genre(s): Allegory
- Publication date: 1917

Pinjada Ko Suga (Nepali: पिंजडाको सुगा; lit. 'The Parrot in the Cage') is a 1917 Nepali-language Hindu allegory poem by Lekhnath Paudyal.

== Background ==
Pinjada Ko Suga is described as an "allegory with a dual meaning". The poem also contains Hindu religious verses, and double entendres to Brum Shumsher – the poet's employer. It is one of the most famous poems in Nepal.

== Text ==
बालक बबुरो दिजशुक नाम
हुँ म परेको छु पिंजडामा
मकन हरे शिव शान्ति र चैन
सपना बिच पनि रति भर छैन
मेरा बान्धव बाबु र आमा
बस्छन वनका एक कुनामा
को सित पोखुँ मनको ताप
गर्दै पिजडा बाट बिलाप
अंशु बगाई कहिले रुन्छु
कहिले मुर्दा तुल्य म हुन्छु
कहिले पागल सरि उफ्रन्छु
केवल वनका सुख सम्झन्छु
फलफुल खाइ नित्य रमाई
वनमा फिर्ने बबुरो लाई
विधिले पार्यो पिजडा भित्र
कर्म हरे शिव हुन्छ बिचित्र
वरी परी बैरीहरु छन् सारा
छैन कतै तिर कोही सहारा
के गरु कसरी उम्की जाऊँ
को सित मन को दर्द बिसाऊँ
पिजडा फोडु भनिकन चुच्चो
बल संग धस्दा भो सब बुच्चो
बेसरी कुजिए पक्ष्य र पाऊँ
कसरि अब हा काल बिताऊँ
यो कस्तो हो कसरि आयो
बसी कन पिंजडा बिच के खायो
यो सब बुझ्ने कोहि छैन
हाय यसैले मन रहदैन
सुस्खा छ घटी बन्धन चर्को
बोल्नै पर्ने झर्को अर्को
बोलेन भने लाठी उजाई
हुन्छ तयारी पिट्न लाई
यौटा भन्दछ यो हो पाजी
आर्को भन्दछ यो छ बिराजी
भन्द छ तेस्रो आत्मा राम
पढो पढो जी राखो नाम
गुडको बैरी मनुष जाति
सूश्क गराई गुणीका छाती
प्राण पखेरु नलिए सम्म
खुश किन हुन्थ्यो हाय अचम्म
पृथिबी तलमा एउटा सम्म
मानिस बाँकि रहंदा सम्म
तुच्छ सुगाको जन्म नदेऊ
दीन दयालु बिन्ती लेऊ !

— लेखनाथ पौड्याल, पिंजडाको सुगा

== Translation ==
A pitiful, twice-born child called parrot,
I have been trapped in a cage,

Even in my dreams, Lord Shiva,
I find not a grain of peace or rest.

My brothers, my mother and father,
Dwell in a far forest corner,
To whom can I pour out my anguish,
Lamenting from this cage?

Sometimes I weep and shed my tears,
Sometimes I am like a corpse,
Sometimes I leap about, insane,
Remembering forest joys.

This poor thing which wandered the glades
And ate wild fruits of daily delight
Has been thrust by Fate into a cage;
Destiny, Lord, is strange!

All about me I see only foes,
Nowhere can I find a friend,
What can I do, how shall I escape,
To whom can I unburden my heart?

Sometimes it's cold, sometimes the sun shines,
Sometimes I prattle, sometimes I am still,
I am ruled by the fancies of children,
My fortune is constant change.

For my food I have only third-class rice,
And that does not fill me by half,
I cast a glance at my water pot:
Such comforts! That, too, is dry!

Hoarse my voice, tiresome these bonds,
To have to speak is further torment,
But if I refuse to utter a word,
A stick is brandished, ready to beat me.

One says, "It is a stupid ass!"
Another cries, "See, it refuses to speak!"
A third wants me to utter God's name:
"Atma Ram, speak, speak, say the name!"

Fate, you gave my life to this constraint,
You gave me a voice I am forced to use,
But you gave me only half my needs;
Fate, you are all compassion!

And you gave me faculties both
Of melodious speech and discerning taste,
But what do these obtain for me, save
Confinement, abuse, constant threats?

Jailing me, distressing me,
Are the curious sports Man plays,
What heinous crimes these are,
Deliver me, thou God of pity.

Humanity is all virtue's foe,
Exploiting the good till their hearts are dry,
Why should Man ever be content
Till winged breath itself is snatched away?

While a single man on this earth remains,
Until all men have vanished,
Do not let poor parrots be born,
Oh Lord, please hear my prayer!

— Lekhnath Paudyal, Michael Hutt (translator), A Parrot in a Cage

== Adaptation ==
Pinjada Ko Suga was adapted into a song with the same title by Nepali rock band 1974 AD.
