= Banira Giri =

Nepalese poet and novelist (1946–2021)

- वानीरा गिरि
- Born: 11 April 1946; Kurseong, Darjeeling, India
- Died: 24 May 2021 (aged 75); Civil Hospital, Kathmandu, Nepal
- Education: University of North Bengal; Tribhuvan University (Ph.D.)
- Occupations: Poet, novelist
- Notable work: Shabdatit Shantanu; Karagar
- Spouse: Shankar Giri (m. 1967–2021)
- Children: 2
- Awards: Sajha Puraskar

Banira Giri (11 April 1946 – 24 May 2021) was a Nepalese poet and novelist, best known for her novels such as Karagar, Nirbandha and her poetry collections such as Jiwan: Thayamaru and Euta Jiundo Jung Bahadur. In 1999, she received the Sajha Puraskar for her novel, Shabdatit Shantanu, becoming the first woman to win the prize.

She was the first woman to be awarded a Ph.D. by Tribhuvan University for her thesis on the poetry of Gopal Prasad Rimal in 1985.

== Early life and education ==
Giri was born on 11 April 1946 (29 Chaitra 2002 BS) in Kurseong, India. She studied in Darjeeling where she obtained an I.Sc. degree. Her future husband Shankar Giri first saw her while she was studying in Darjeeling. She received her bachelor's degree from North Bengal University.

She traveled to Kathmandu in 1965 (2022 BS) for an award ceremony. A poetry competition was organized by the Royal Nepal Academy. She participated in the competition and stood second. The medals of the competition were distributed by the King Mahendra. While receiving the prize, Giri expressed her interest in pursuing an MA in Nepali literature from Tribhuvan University (TU) to the king. She then received an invitation from the Royal Secretariat to study at TU with scholarship.

== Literary career ==
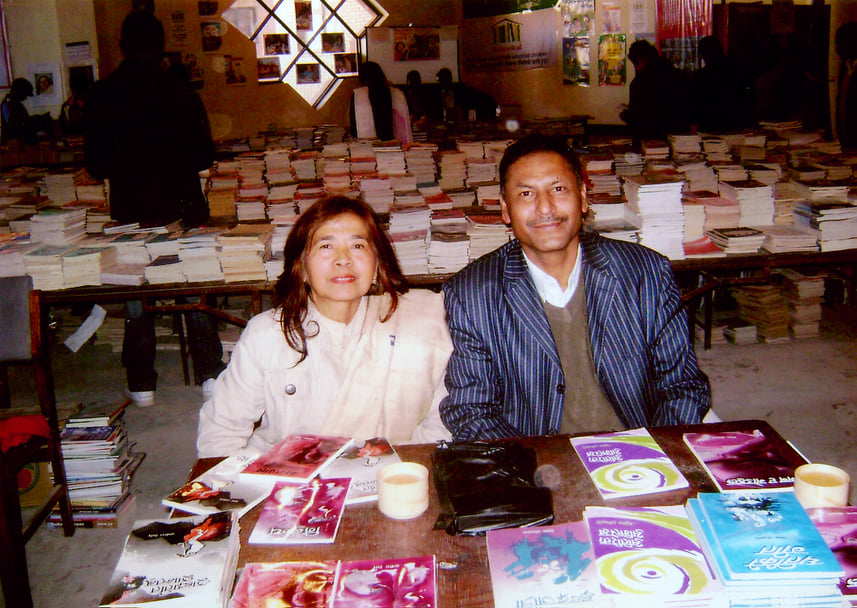
Giri, with her works, at a book exhibition organized by Sajha Prakashan at Rashtriya Nachghar Jamal Kathmandu. Poet Dinesh Adhikari is on her left (25 November 2007).

Giri started teaching at Padma Kanya Campus after receiving her master's degree. She also taught at various colleges and campuses of the Tribhuvan University in her lifetime.

She received a Ph.D. from Tribhuvan University for her thesis Gopal Prasad Rimal ka Kavya ma Swachchhandatavad (transl. Romanticism in the poems of Gopal Prasad Rimal), in 2042 BS (1985–1986). The university was initially reluctant on accepting the proposal of the thesis since Rimal had written only a few poems, but accepted after multiple requests by Giri.

Giri was the second poet, after Laxmi Prasad Devkota, to represent Nepal at the Afro-Asian Writers' Conference; she did so in 1975.

She published her first book Euta Jiundo Jung Bahadur, a poetry collection, in 1974 (Jestha 2031 BS). She received positive reviews for her work and published a second poetry collection titled Jiwan: Thayamaru, in 1977 (2034 BS).

Her third work was a novel titled Karagar, published in 1978. It is the story of a lonely woman living in Kathmandu. It deals with her relationship with her brothers after the death of their parents and her affair with a married man. The novel remains one of her widely-read works. In 1985 (2042 BS), she published the novel's sequel, Nirbandha.

In 1999 (2056 BS), Giri published a poetic fantasy novel titled Shabdatit Shantanu, for which she received the Sajha award.

== Notable works ==
Title	Year of publication	Genre	Notes
Euta Jiundo Jung Bahadur	1974	Poetry collection	
Jiwan: Thayamaru	1977	Poetry collection	
Karagar	1978	Novel	
Mero Avishkar	1984	Memoir	
Nirbandha	1985	Novel	
Shabdatit Shantanu	1999	Novel	Winner—Sajha Puraskar
Parbatko Arko Naam Parbati	2010	Essay collection	
Kathmandu Kathmandu	2011	Poetry collection	
Jungle Jungle	2012	Essay collection	
Rokinele Aakar Dina Sakdaina	2014	Travelogue	

== Personal life and death ==
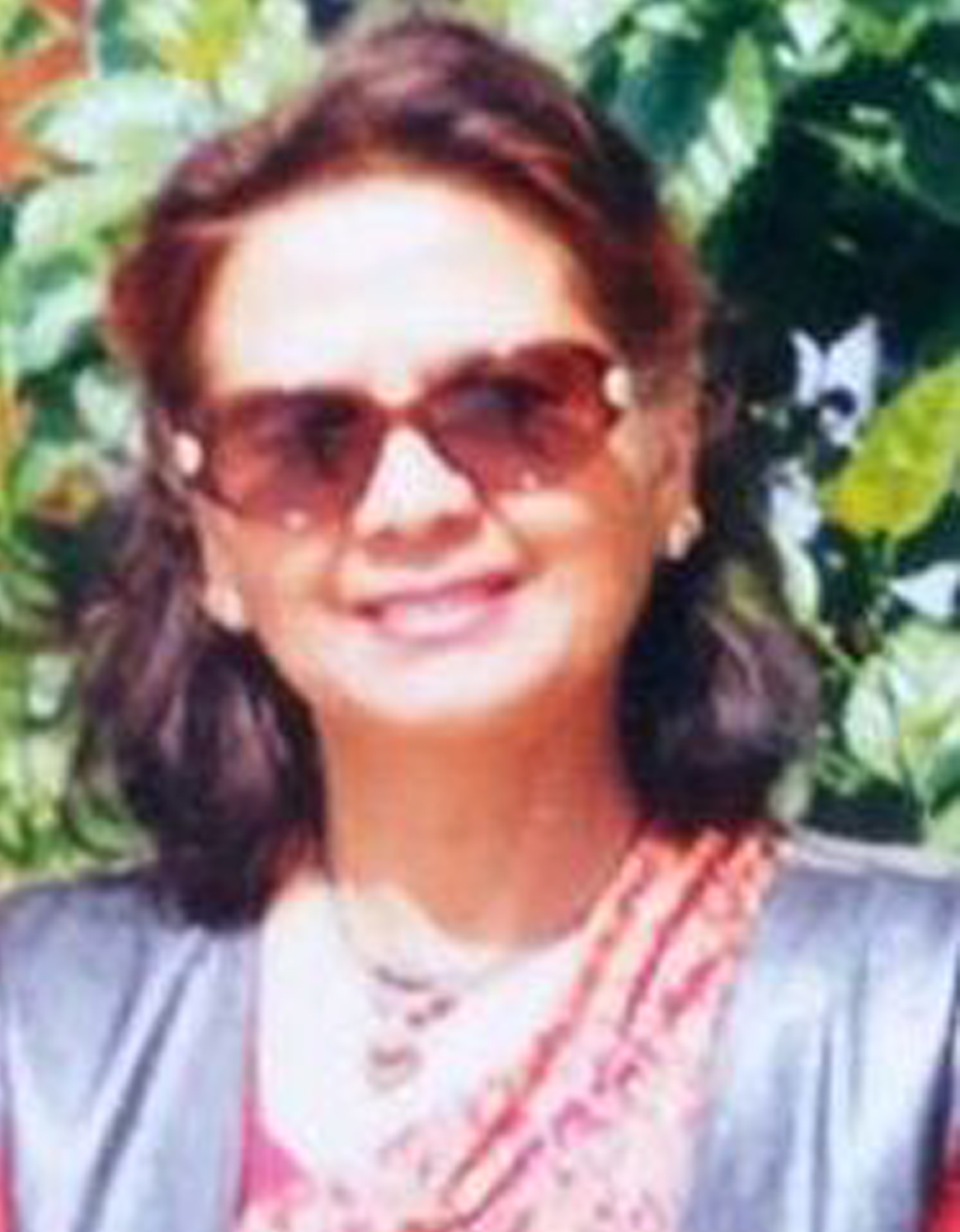
Giri (2000)

She married Shankar Giri, an engineer from Janakpur, in 1967.

She was a close friend of the writer Parijat.

On the night of 24 May 2021, Giri died following a heart attack and testing positive for COVID-19, at the age of 75. She was survived by her husband, a son and a daughter.

== Awards and legacy ==
She won the Sajha Puraskar in 1999 for her poetic fantasy work Shabatit Shantanu. She was the first woman to win the award. She was also awarded with Suprabal-Gorkha-Dakshin-Bahu, the second highest civilian honour in the Kingdom of Nepal by His Majesty's Government of Nepal.

Her husband, Shankar Giri, established a non-profit foundation called the Banira Giri Foundation in 2019. Its aim is to help aspiring writers financially and in other ways. The foundation also has an archive of the books, manuscripts and photographs of the poet. A life-size statue of Giri was built on the property of the foundation; it was unveiled on 11 May 2022 by Dr. Basudev Tripathi. The foundation also presented various awards to poets and artists on that day.
