= Sajha Puraskar =

Nepali literary award

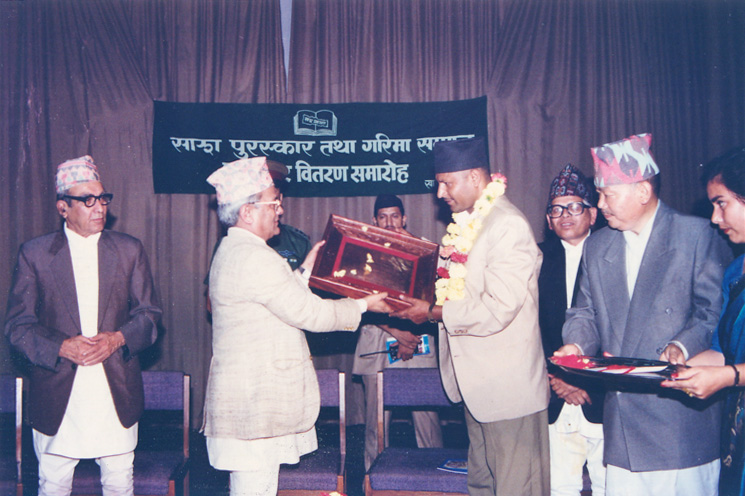
- Dinesh Adhikari receiving the Sajha Puraskar.
- Awarded for: Literary award in Nepal
- Sponsored by: Sajha Publications
- Country: Nepal
- Reward: 25,000 Nepalese rupees (NPR)
- First holder: Bhupi Sherchan
- Related: Madan Puraskar

Sajha Puraskar (Nepali: साझा पुरस्कार) is a literary award given by Sajha Publications. It is presented annually to the best book published by Sajha Publication.

== History ==
It was established in 1967 and the first award was given to Bhupi Sherchan for his book Ghumne Mechmathi Andho Manche in 1969. Banira Giri is the first woman to receive the Sajha Puraskar. In 2013, the prize money was 49,000 Nepalese rupees (NPR).

== Recipients ==
Year (in BS)^{[Note a]}	Book	Author	Ref(s)
2026	Ghumne Mechmathi Andho Manche	Bhupi Sherchan	
2027	Ek Bato Anek Mod	Bijaya Malla	
2028	Sama Ra Sama Ka Kriti	Tara Nath Sharma	
2029	Bhimsen Ko Antya	Balkrishna Sama	
2030	Mohan Koiralaka Kavita	Mohan Koirala	
2031	Bairagi Kailaka Kabitaharu	Bairagi Kainla	
2032	Aagat	Bhawani Bhikshu	
2033	Shahkalin Kala Ra Bastukala	Dr.Jagdish Chandra Regmi	
2034	Pratyek Thau : Pratyek Manchhe	Peter J. Karthak	
2035	Ghamka Pailaharu	Dhanush Chandra Gautam ("Dha. Cha. Gotame")	
2036	Devkota	Chudamani Bandhu	
2037	Nepali Upanyas Ra Upanyaskar	Krishna Chandra Singh Pradhan	
2038	Samantar	Ishwor Ballav	
2039	Hamro Samaj: Ek Adhyayan	Janaklal Sharma	
2039	Madhabi	Madan Mani Dixit	
2040	Ritu Nimantran	Mohan Koirala	
2041	Sadak Dekhi Sadak Samma	Ashesh Malla	
2042	Yeha Dekhi Teha Samma	Dhanush Chandra Gautam ("Dha. Cha. Gotame")	
2043	Purvakatha	Rajeshwor Devkota	
2044	Suwananda Das Dekhi Rajiv Lochan Samma	Ganesh Bahadur Prasai	
2045	Bishudai	Kishor Pahadi	
2046	Timri Swasni Ra Ma	Manu Brajaki	
2047	Paila: Aagatma Tekera	Krishna Chandra Singh Pradhan	
2048	Aashu Tyasai Tyasai Chhachalkinchha	Daulat Bikram Bista	
2049	Prithviraj Chauhan	Laxmi Prasad Devkota	
2050	Dishahin Aakash	Gopal Parajuli	
2051	Indra Jatra	Dinesh Adhikari	
2052	Yojana Gandha	Binod Prasad Dhital	
2053	Nafuleka Phoolharu	Kshetra Pratap Adhikary	
2054	Himalpari Himalwari	Madhav Prasad Ghimire	
2055	Mritu-Kavita	Meghraj Sharma Nepal ("Manjul")	
2056	Shabdatit Shantanu	Banira Giri	
2057	Rara Ko Saruan	Purna Prakash Nepal ("Yatri")	
2058	Charu Charcha	Madhav Prasad Ghimire	
2059	Tathakathit	Dhruba Chandra Gautam	
2060	Andhakar	Dhruba Sapkota	
2061	Cheuko Badhshala	Bimal Nibha	
2062	Samantar Aakash	Padmavati Singh	
2063	Hari Adhikari Ka Kabita	Hari Adhikari	
2064	Sahitya ra Samaj	Rishi Raj Baral	
2065	Pretkalpa	Narayan Dhakal	
2066	Sankraman ko Sahitya Ra Samakalinta	Purusottam Subedi	
2067	Ashwamedh Yagya ka Ghodaharu	Dubushu Chhetri	
2068	Mera Jiwanka Pana	Gaura Parsai	
2069	Trasa Ishwar	Thakur Belbase	
2070	Not Awarded		
2071	Not Awarded		
2072	Not Awarded		
2073	Doha ko Sidha Udan	Jaya Chhaanchhaa	

== See also ==
- Madan Puraskar
- Padmashree Sahitya Puraskar
- Jagadamba Shree Puraskar

== Notes ==
- ^[Note a] Year in B.S. = Year in C.E. + 56\57; 2077 B.S. = 2020/2021
