= Bhupi Sherchan =

Nepali poet (1937–1989)

- भूपी शेरचन
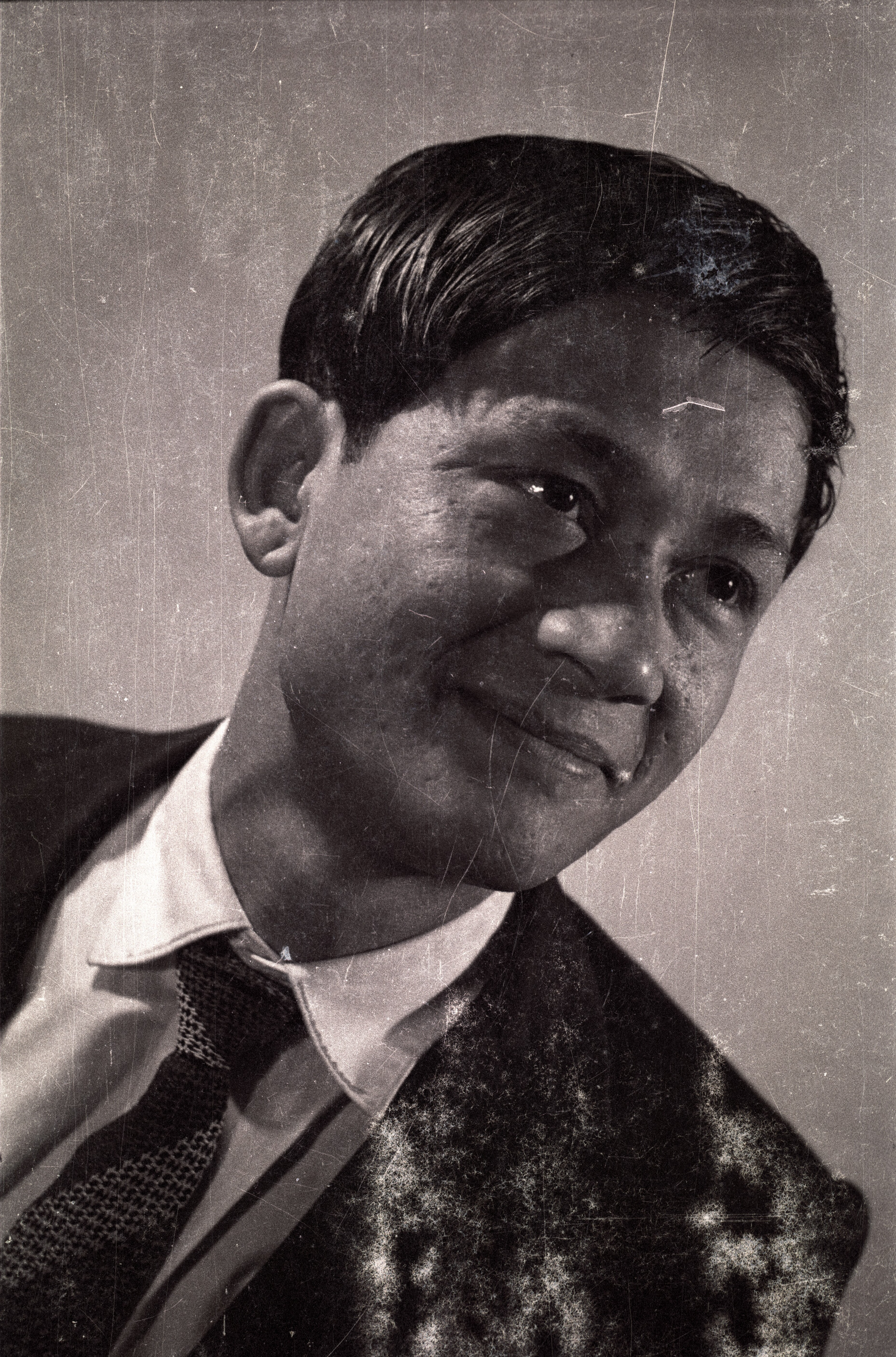
- Born: Bhupendra Man Sherchan; 27 December 1937; Tukuche, Mustang, Nepal
- Died: 14 May 1989 (aged 51); Kathmandu, Nepal
- Other name: Sarbahara Kavi
- Occupation: Poet
- Notable work: Ghumne Mech Mathi Andho Manche
- Spouses: Om Kumari Tulachan; Kanti Rana
- Children: 8
- Parents: Hit Man Sherchan (father); Padma Kumari Sherchan (mother)
- Awards: Sajha Puraskar
- Website: bhupisherchan.com

Bhupendra Man Sherchan, popularly known as Bhupi Sherchan (1937–1989) was a Nepali poet and academician. He is one of the most beloved and widely read Nepali poets. He was awarded the Sajha Puraskar for his 1969 poetry collection Ghumne Mech Mathi Andho Manche, which remains his most popular work.

== Early life and education ==
Sherchan was born on 27 December 1937 (12 Poush 1992 BS) in Tukuche, Mustang in an affluent Thakali family to father Subba Hit Man Sherchan and mother Padma Kumari Sherchan. He was their fifth child. Since he was born on the day of Pushe Aunsi (New moon day of the Hindu month Poush), his father considered the new-born inauspicious and refused to see his face until six months later, after consulting an astrologer.

His mother died when he was five years old. At the age of around ten or twelve, he moved to Banaras with his elder brother, Yogendra Man and niece, Urmila.

== Student Life ==
While in college, he started being involved in politics. The main political parties in Banaras then were the Congress and Communists. Sherchan became associated with the Communists. He published his first work, a play titled Pariwartan, in 1951, while in college. The play was published under his real name Bhupendra Man Sherchan, when he was 16 years old. It was inspired by the anti-Rana protest in Nepal. He also started writing Sarbahara (Proletariat) after his name.

Since his brother was a member of the Nepali Congress and he was Communist, there was an ideological rift between the brothers which led to Sherchan moving out of his brother's residence. He started writing poems under a pseudonym. Simultaneously, protests against the Rana regime had begun in Nepal. He took part in the protests which led to his imprisonment. He received a BA degree from Banaras College.

== Literary Life ==
Sherchan's family traditionally worked as traders and merchants, but he did not pursue either profession. Instead, he decided to immerse himself in the Nepali literary world. His first poetry collection Nayaa Jhyaure was published by Janayug Prakashan, Benaras, in 1953. The poetry collection was published under his pseudonym Sarbahara (Proletariat) and was influenced by communist ideology. In 2012 BS (1955-1956), he became the district secretary of the Communist Party of Nepal.

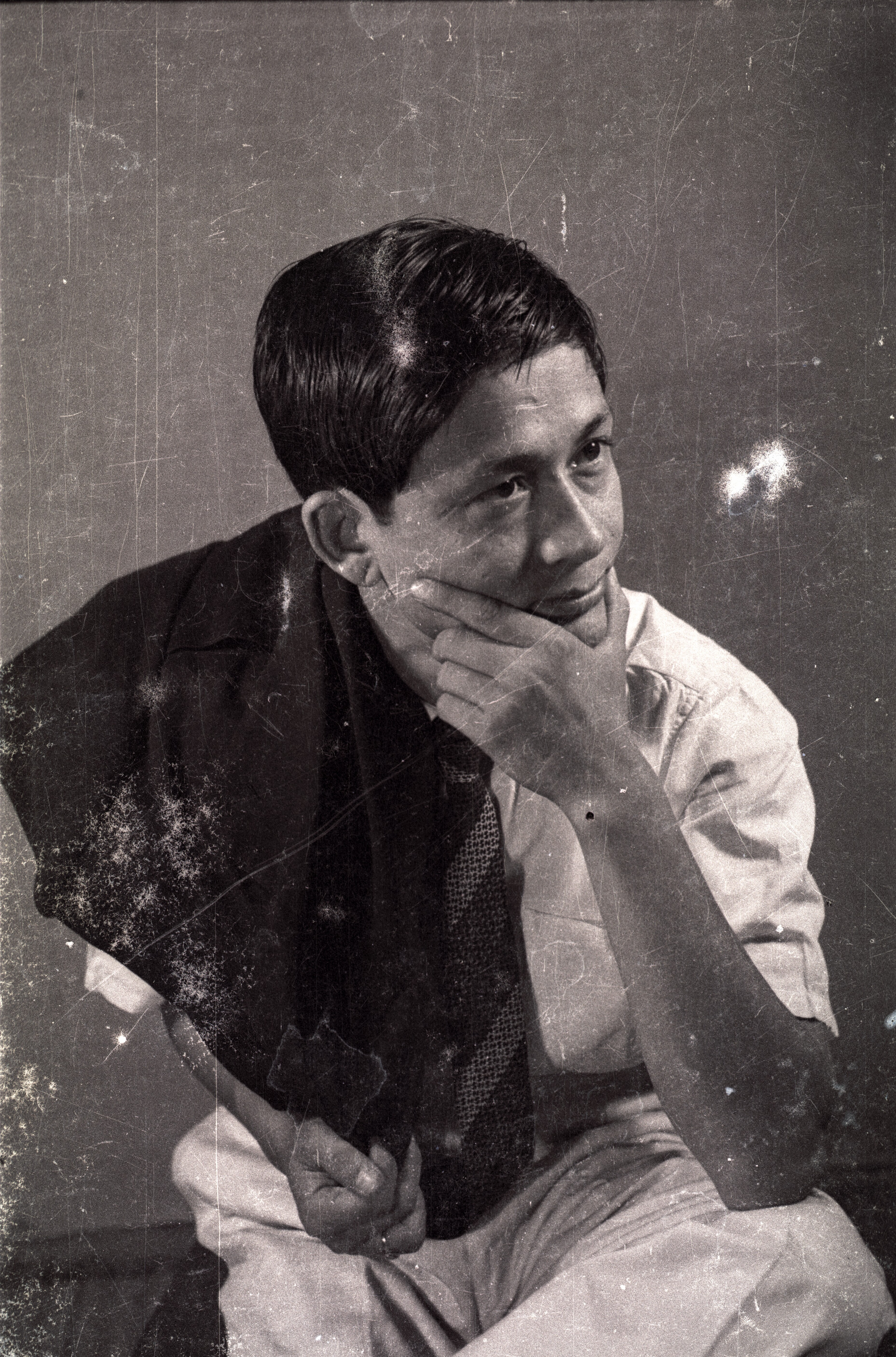
Bhupi Sherchan

Nirjhar, Sherchan's second poetry collection was published in 1958 by Narendra Yantralaya in Kathmandu. The poems in this collection follow the Nepalese metric style (Chhanda). He started writing under the name Bhupi Sherchan after publishing Nirjhar. In 1969, Sajha Prakashan published an anthology of his poems in a book Ghumne Mechmathi Andho Manche. The poems in this collection were originally published in literary periodicals such as Ruprekha and Madhuparka. The book won him the first ever Sajha Puraskar in late 2025 BS (1969).

Bhupi Sherchan Ka Kavita, a poetry collection edited by Shiva Regmi was published in 2008. The collection contains poems published in various literary magazines but not included in Ghumne Mech Mathi Andho Manchhe.

He is considered the most successful Nepalese poet to have employed free verse. His poems reflected his analysis of humans and human life from different perspectives, and his biggest contribution to Nepalese society is regarded to be his attempts to guide his generation through poetry. His Himalayan nationalism can be seen in his poem Hami (Us), where he claimed that Nepalese are brave, but foolish (because they are brave).

Sherchan produced several odes to the martyrs of Nepal, including Sahid Ko Samjhana, Main Batti Ko Sikha, and Ghantaghar. Ghumne Mech Mathi Andho Manche (Blind Man on a Revolving Chair) is his most popular poetry collection.

He was also appointed a member of the Royal Nepal Academy for two terms from 1979 to 1989.

== Notable works ==
=== Play ===
- Pariwartan (transl. Change, 1951)

=== Poetry collections ===
- Nayaa Jhyaure (transl. New Songs, 1956)
- Nirjhar (transl. Waterfall, 1958)
- Ghumne Mech Mathi Andho Manche (transl. A Blind Mind on A Revolving Chair, 1969)
- Bhupi Sherchan Ka Kavita (transl. Poems of Bhupi Sherchan, edited by Shiva Regmi, 2008)

== Personal life and death ==
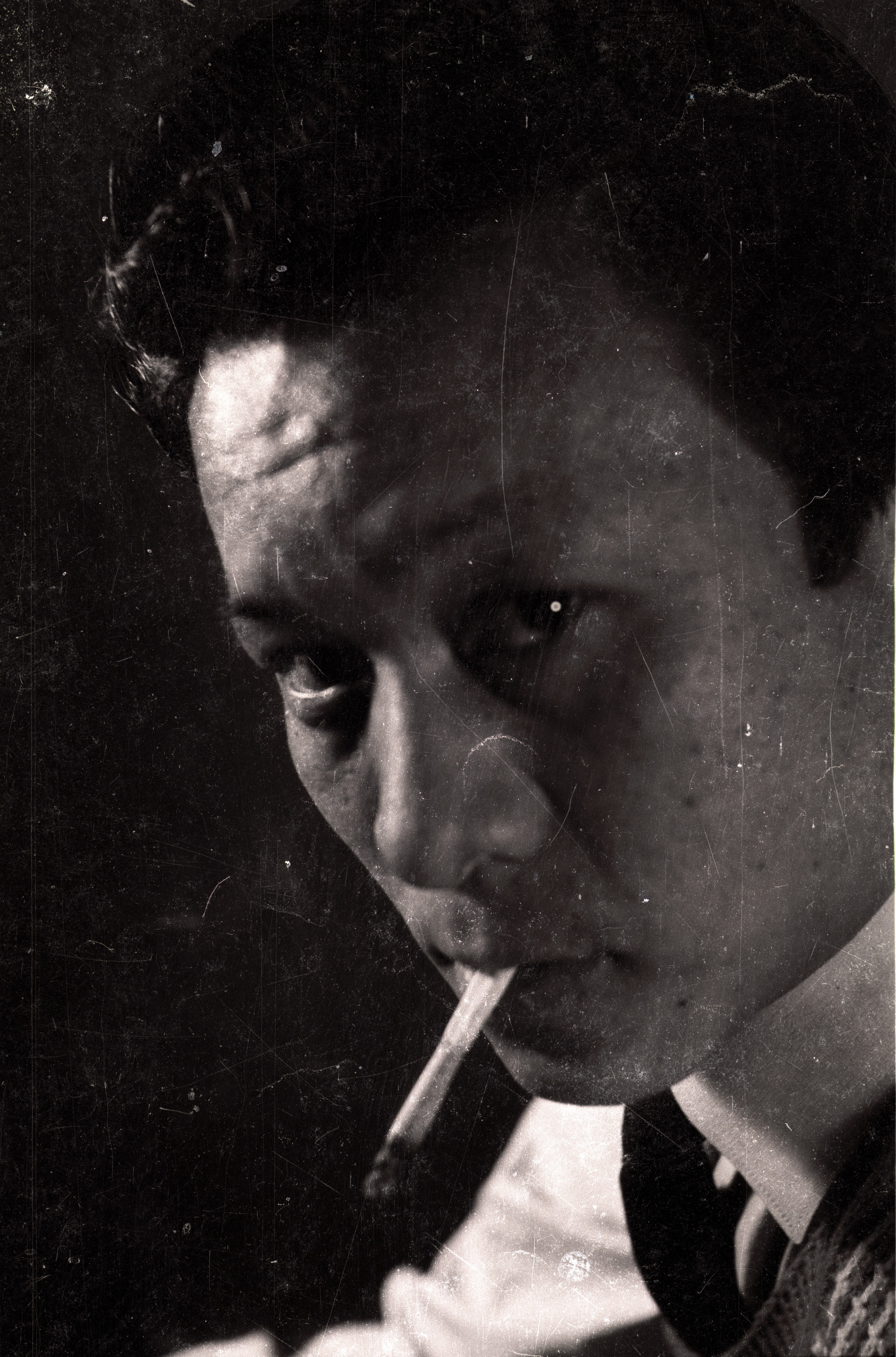
Bhupi Sherchan (Source: Madan Puraskar Pustakalaya)

Sherchan married twice. His first marriage was to Om Kumari Tulachan and in 1969, he married Kanti Rana. He had six children (five daughters and a son) with Om Kumari Tulachan and two (a daughter and a son) with Kanti Rana. Since his college days, he had developed the habit of smoking that led to lung-related complications later. He was also interested in music and cricket.

He died on 14 May 1989 (1 Jestha 2046 BS) in Kathmandu.

== Legacy ==
Sherchan is considered the pioneer of free verse poetry in Nepali literature. Prof. Michael J. Hutt published Sherchan's biography, The life of Bhupi Sherchan: Poetry and Politics in Post-Rana Nepal in 2010. The biography also contains Sherchan's poems translated by Hutt into English.

In 2023, his daughter, Kavita, published another biography entitled Bhupi: A Daughter's Memoir.

The title of the 2022 Nepali movie Chiso Ashtray is based on Sherchan's poem from the collection Ghumne Mechmathi Andho Manche, of the same name.

== See also ==
- Laxmi Prasad Devkota
- Shankar Lamichhane
- Parijat
- Banira Giri
