= Krishna Chandra Singh Pradhan =

Nepali writer (1928–2010)

- कृष्णचन्द्रसिंह प्रधान
- Born: 26 July 1925; Nhuchhen Galli Kathmandu
- Died: 29 June 2010 (aged 84); Tripureshwor, Kathmandu
- Occupation: Writer
- Children: 3
- Parents: Surya Prasad Singh Pradhan (father); Maya Devi Pradhan (mother)
- Awards: Madan Puraskar; Sajha Puraskar

Krishna Chandra Singh Pradhan (Nepali: कृष्णचन्द्रसिंह प्रधान; 1925–2010) was a famous litterateur and critic of Nepal. He received the prestigious Madan Puraskar for Kavi Vyathit ra Kavya Sadhana, a literary criticism on Kedar Man Vyathit in 1958.

== Early life ==
He was born on 26 July 1925 (11 Shrawan 1982 BS) to father Surya Prasad Singh Pradhan and mother Maya Devi in Nhuchhen Galli Kathmandu.

== Notable works ==
Essay collections

- Salik
- Anaam Satya
- Bagmati ko Haraf
- Samya Tsunami

Poetry collection

- Bhanjyang Neri

Literary criticism

- Kavi Vyathit ra Kavya Sadhana
- Nepali Upanyas ra Upanyaskar
- Srijanako Serophero
- Kriti ko Awalokan

Memoir

- Napharkine Ti Dinharu
- Jindagi ka Tippaniharu

== Awards ==
Pradhan's literary career has been recognized with prestigious awards like Madan Puraskar, Sajha Puraskar, which he won two times, and Uttam Puraskar.

== Personal life ==
He died on 29 June 2010 (17 Ashar 2067) in Kathmandu. He was survived by his son and two daughters.
