= Bhawani Bhikshu =

Nepali writer and novelist (1914-1981)

- भवानी भिक्षु
- Born: Nohor Ram Gupta; 3 June 1914; Taulihawa, Kapilvastu, Nepal
- Died: 16 April 1981 (aged 66); Kathmandu, Nepal
- Occupations: Writer, novelist
- Notable work: Aagat; Pipe no.2
- Awards: Madan Puraskar (1975); Sajha Puraskar (1975); Tribhuwan Pragya Puraskar 2036 BS (1979–1980)

Nohor Ram Gupta, professionally known as Bhawani Bhikshu (Nepali: भवानी भिक्षु) was a Nepali writer, poet, literary journalist, academic and novelist. He has written multiple novels and short stories. Aagat, a novel published in 1975 is one of his best known books.

== Early life and education ==
He was born as Nohor Ram Gupta on 3 June 1914 (Jestha 21, 1966 BS) in Taulihawa, Kapilvastu, Nepal to mother Yashoda Devi Kalwar Gupta and father Indra Prasad Gupta. At the age of 4, he suffered from smallpox. His parents prayed to goddess Durga for his wellbeing. After he recovered, they changed his name to Bhawani in honour of the goddess.

After completing his education till fourth grade in a language school in his village, he was sent to his maternal house in India. He gave Hindi-medium Kulbhusan examination at the age of 12 in India in which he received the second position. After completing his education, he started working as a copywriter in a Nepalese government office. He started being interested in writing in Nepali during his time as a copywriter.

== Literary career ==
He worked as the editor of Sharada magazine in 1951. He worked for Royal Nepal Academy after its establishment in 1957. He received the prestigious Madan Puraskar for his novel Aagat in 1975 (2032 BS). He also won the Sajha Puraskar for the same novel.

== Notable works ==
Short stories collection

- Tyo Pheri Pharkala ? and Other Stories
- Gunakeshari (1953)
- Maiyasaheb (1960)
- Avarta (Whirlpool, 1967)
- Avaantar

Novels

- Subhadra Bajya (2019)
- Aagat (2033)
- Pipe no. Dui (2032)
- Behind the Scenes (2030)

Poetry collections

- Chhaya
- Prakash
- Parishkar

== Personal life ==
He married twice but both of his marriage was unsuccessful. He died on 16 April 1981 in Kathmandu, Nepal.

== See also ==
- List of Nepali writers
- Riddhi Bahadur Malla
- Madan Mani Dixit
