= Ruprekha =

Defunct Nepalese literary magazine

- 203rd issue
- Categories: Literary magazine
- Frequency: Monthly/semi-monthly
- Founder: Shree Ram Dev Bhattarai
- Founded: 1961
- Final issue: Ruprekha
- Country: Nepal
- Based in: Kathmandu
- Language: Nepali

Ruprekha (Nepali: रूपरेखा, lit. 'Outline') was a Nepali literary magazine. It was published monthly. It was one of the longest running literary magazine in Nepal. It was in publication for about two decades before closing down. Many prominent Nepalese writers started their career by publishing their work in this magazine. The magazine featured the works of Bhupi Sherchan, Shankar Lamichhane, Bairagi Kainla and many other prominent Nepalese writers.

== History ==
It was founded by Shree Ram Dev Bhattarai and his team in 1961 as a semi-monthly magazine. The magazine flourished under the editorship of Uttam Kunwar and Bal Mukunda Pandey. The magazine also inspired various literary magazines such as Himani, Rachana, Bhanu, Fulpati, Mukut, etc. The magazine was printed in Rupayan Press in Dhoka Tole, Kathmandu.

The 200th issue of the magazine featured an interview with King Birendra about Nepali literature and language, which increased the popularity of the magazine.

== See also ==
- Sharada
- Nepali Times
- Nari
- Kantipur
