= Lekhnath Paudyal =

Nepalese poet (1885–1966)

Kabi Shiromani Lekhnath Paudyal
- लेखनाथ पौड्याल
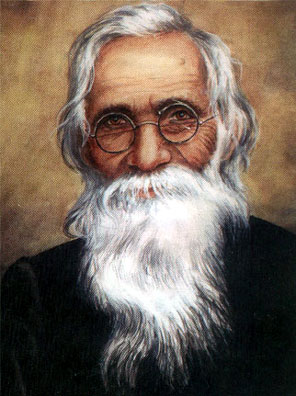
- Portrait of Lekhnath Paudyal
- Born: 1885 (15 Poush 1941 BS); Arghau Archale, Kaski, Nepal
- Died: 1966 (aged 80–81)
- Citizenship: Nepali
- Occupations: Poet, short-story writer, playwright, essayist
- Notable work: Pinjadako Suga (A Parrot in a Cage); Ritu Vichara (Contemplation of the Seasons, 1916); Buddhi Binoda (Enjoyments of Wisdom); Satya-Kali-Sambada (A Dialogue Between the Degenerate Age and the Age of Truth, 1919)

Lekhnath Paudyal (Nepali: लेखनाथ पौड्याल; 1885–1966) is regarded as the founding father of modern Nepali poetry literature (Nepali: कविशिरोमणि (Kavi Shiromani)) in the twentieth-century. His most important contribution is believed to be to the enrichment and refinement of the language rather than to its philosophical breadth. The best of Lekhnath's poems adhered to the old-fashioned conventions of Sanskrit poetics (kavya).

Poudyal, the first modern Nepali poet, wrote in the classical style of Nepali poetry. His poems possessed a formal dignity that had been lacking in most earlier works in Nepali; many of them conformed in their outlook with the philosophy of orthodox Vedanta, although others were essentially original in their tone and inspiration. His poems often mentioned contemporary social and political issues and remain popular. It is believed there were the first glimmerings of the poetic spirit that was to come after him.

== Personal life and childhood ==
Lekhnath was born in Arghaun-Archale which lies at present Ward No 26, Pokhara Metropolitan City in Gandaki Province of Nepal in 1885. From an early age, he composed pedantic "riddle-solving" (samasya-purti) verses, a popular genre adapted from an earlier Sanskrit tradition, and his first published poems appeared in 1904. Two poems were published in an Indian Nepali journal, Sundari. Literally, his name means (Lekh: to write, Nath: god) the god of writing.

== Education ==
He received his first lessons from his father. Around the turn of the century, he was sent to Kathmandu to attend a Sanskrit school and thence to the holy city of Banaras, as was customary, to continue his higher education to learn the classics of Sanskrit literature, from which he drew great inspiration.

== Titles and honours ==
In 1951, Lekhnath was invested by King Tribhuvan with the title of kabi siromani, which literally means "crest-jewel poet" but is generally translated as "poet laureate". Since his death in 1966, no other poet has been similarly honoured, so the title would seem to be his in perpetuity. Lekhnath was honoured by the Nepali literary world on his seventieth birthday in 1955 when he became the focal point of a procession around the streets of Kathmandu. The procession was probably modelled on the old-age initiation ceremony practised by the Newars of Kathmandu Valley. The old poet was seated in a ceremonial carriage and paraded through the city, pulled by most of the better-known poets of the time and even by the then prime minister. In 1957, he was awarded membership in the newly founded Royal Nepal Academy, and in 1969 he was honoured posthumously with the prestigious Tribhuvan Puraskar prize. These honours are a mark of the peculiar reverence felt by members of the cultural establishment of Nepal for the man whose poems represent the "classical" aspect of their modern literature. He can no longer escape the scorn of the young, however, and he is rarely imitated by aspiring poets. In an essay published in 1945, Devkota defended the "laureate" from his critics.

== Struggle ==
Initially, during his stay in India, his young wife died and he had been penniless. Penniless, he embarked on a search for his father's old estate in the Nepalese lowlands, which was ultimately fruitless, and he, therefore, spent the next few years of his life seeking work in India. During that time, he achieved little academic success. In 1909 he returned to Kathmandu, where he entered the employ of Bhim Shamsher, an important member of the ruling Rana family, as priest and tutor. He retained this post for twenty-five years. During his stay in Kathmandu, he used to teach the children of the scholarly Ram Mani Dixit's family. Because of similar literature interest and scholarly works he became a good friend of Ram Mani Dixit (a renowned scholar and important advisor of then Rana regime), Dixit supported Paudyal in his hard times.

One of Lekhnath's most popular poems, "A Parrot in a Cage" (Pinjadako Suga) is usually interpreted as an allegory with a dual meaning: on one level of interpretation, it describes the condition of the soul trapped in the body, a common theme in Hindu devotional verse, but it also bewails the poet's lot as an employee of Bhim Shamsher. Here the parrot, which has to make profound utterances according to its master's whim, is actually the poet himself. This particular poem is extremely famous in Nepal because it is one of the earliest examples of a writer criticizing the Rana families who ruled the country at the time. During that time, It was the topic of bravery to write against cruel Ranas. Although he was initially hesitant to publish the poem, he was enlivened by Sardar Ram Mani Dixit, who promised to bring out his works and bring him literary success if he continued writing. He laments derogatory remarks from then Rana ruler and in other hand encouragement from Ram Mani in one of stanza from Pinjada Ko Suga "A Parrot in a Cage" in following way:

एउटा भन्छ यो हो पाजी।
"One says (Rana ruler), "It is a stupid ass!"
अर्को भन्दछ यो छ बिराजी।
Another says, "See, it just sits idol!"
भन्दछ तेस्रो आत्माराम पढो पढोजी राखो नाम।
A third AatmaRam (Rammani) says "Read and Speak it will keep your name".

== Relation with Ram Mani Dixit ==
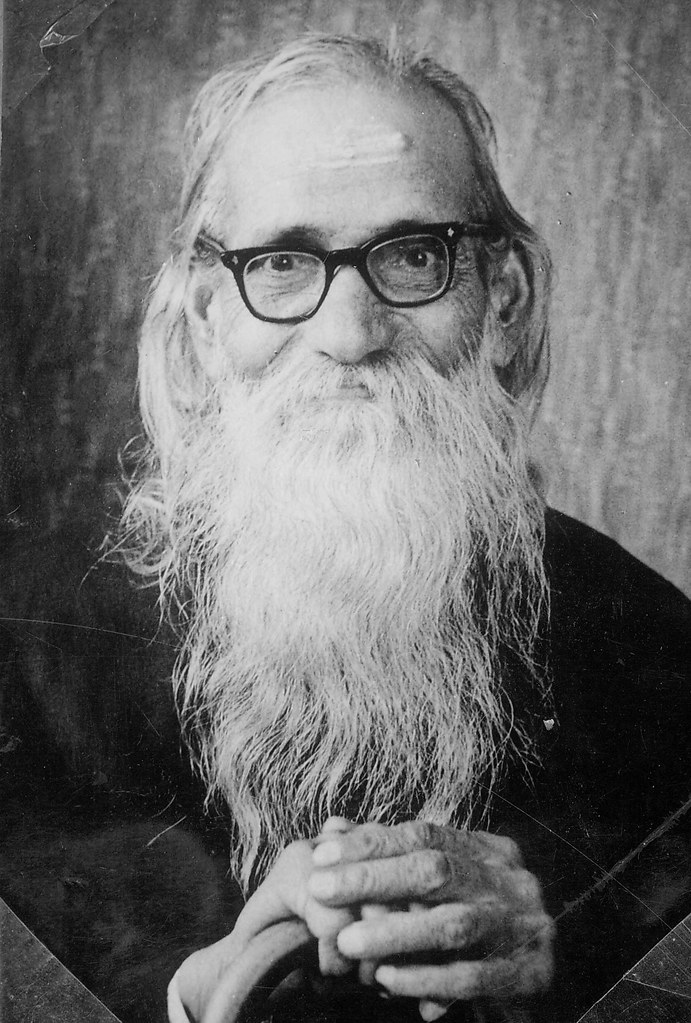
Lekhnath Paudyal (Source: Madan Puraskar Pustakalaya)

Ram Mani Acharya Dixit, the editor of the journal Madhavi, did much to help Lekhnath to establish his reputation as a poet. In 1909, when Lekhnath returned to Kathmandu, he entered the employ of Bhim Shamsher, an important member of the ruling Rana family, as priest and tutor. He retained this post for twenty-five years. Because of similar literature interests and scholarly works they became good friends of Sardar Ram Mani Dixit, who was a renowned scholar and important advisor of then Rana regime. During his stay in Kathmandu, he taught Ram Mani Dixit's children, and Dixit supported Paudyal in his hard times. As a result of this fruitful relation, his first major composition, Varsha Vichara (Reflections on the Rains), was first published in Madhavi in 1909.

== Chariot procession ==
On 4 January 1955, the Nepalese poetic society presented their compliments to the poet by placing him on a ratha (chariot). The poet had just turned seventy years few days ago. The chariot was pulled from Thamel to an ancient round tree in Tundikhel by thousands of admirers of the poet. King Tribhuvan also presented his compliments. The then prime minister Matrika Prasad Koirala, Mahakabi Laxmi Prasad Devkota, playwright Balkrishna Sama, poet Siddhicharan Shrestha, the then home minister Tanka Prasad Acharya, American priest Fr. Moran were some of the intellectuals who pulled the chariot. The wheels of the chariot was engraved with Satyam Shivam Sundaram. A team of four different Scouts unit, eight women cavalry, and a military musical troupe accompanied the procession. Yugkabi Siddicharan Shrestha was the organizer of the event. Playwright Balakrishna Sama, Laxmi Prasad Devkota, Rudra Raj Pandey, Dr. Yadav Prasad Pant, Chittadhar Hridaya and others writers praised Paudyal during the event. On behalf of His Majesty's Government, a bag of Rs. 5,000 was presented to the poet who immediately donated it to Nepal Shikshya Parisadh. This chariot procession is considered as a unique and unprecedented event in the history of Nepali literature.

== Contributions ==
Most of Lekhnath Paudyal's short poems are collected in Lalitya (Delicacy), published in two volumes in 1967 and 1968. In all of his creations, his primary concern was to create "sweetness" in the language of his poems, and many were rewritten several times before the poet was content with them. The primary inspiration for this work was probably The Chain of the Seasons (Ritu-Samhara) by the great fifth-century Sanskrit poet Kalidasa.

His devotional poems are more formal and are admired for their beauty and for the sincerity of the emotions they express. "Remembering Saraswati" (Saraswati-Smriti) is the prime illustration of this feature of Lekhnath's poetry. His first composition after 1950 was a long poem entitled "Remembering the Truth of Undying Light" (Amar Jyotiko Satya-Smriti), which expressed grief over the death of Mahatma Gandhi. Lekhnath did not develop the great promise of these early episodic poems further until much later in his life, but a large number of his shorter poems continued to appear in a variety of literary journals in both India and Nepal. Many poems were probably never published and may now be lost. A two-volume collection, Delicacy (Lalitya) was published in 1967–1968 and contained one hundred poems. Lekhnath's shorter works covered a wide variety of topics and conveyed all of the nine rasa. Although many are plainly moralistic, some have a whimsical charm and are often couched in uncharacteristically simple language. One such is "The Chirruping of a Swallow" (Gaunthaliko Chiribiri), first published in 1935, in which a swallow explains the transient nature of existence to the poet:

You say this house is yours,
I say that it is mine,
To whom in fact does it belong?
Turn your mind to that!

His longer works – khanda-kavya and Mahakavya – are (with dates of first publication):

Year	Creations	English Translation of the Title	Original name in Nepali
1909	Varsha Vichara	Reflections on the Rains	वर्षा विचार
1916	Ritu Vichara	Contemplation of the Seasons	ऋतु विचार
1916	Buddhi Vinoda	Enjoyments of Wisdom	बुद्धि विनोद
1919	Satya-Kali-Samvada	A Dialogue Between the Degenerate Age and the Age of Truth	सत्य-कलि-संवाद
1935	Arunodaya	Dawn	अरूणोदय
1951	Amar Jyotiko Satya-Smriti	Remembering the Truth of Undying Light	अमर ज्योतिको सत्य स्मृति
1953	Tarun Tapasi	The Young Ascetic	तरूण तपस्वी
1954	Mero Rama	My God	मेरो राम
1967 & 1968	Lalitya (Collection of short poems)	Delicacy	लालित्य
N/A	Ganga Gauri	Goddess of the Ganges	गंगा गौरी

== See also ==
- Bhanubhakta Acharya
- Motiram Bhatta
