= Balkrishna Sama =

Nepalese playwright (1903–1981)

Natya Siromani Balkrishna Sama
- brisha
- Born: Balkrishna Shamsher Jang Bahadur Rana; 8 February 1902; Kumaripati, Kathmandu, Nepal
- Died: 20 June 1981 (aged 78); Kathmandu
- Occupations: Author, playwright
- Notable work: Chiso Chulho
- Spouse: Mandakini
- Children: briga
- Relatives: General Samar Shumsher JBR (father); Kirti Rajyalaxmi Rana (mother); Dambar Shumsher Rana (grandfather)
- Awards: Sajha Puraskar

Balkrishna Shamsher Jang Bahadur Rana or Bala Krishna Sama (Nepali: बालकृष्ण सम; 8 February 1903 – 20 June 1981) was a Nepalese dramatist. For his great contributions to Nepali literature, he was awarded the title Natya Siromani (Crest-jewel of playwright). He is considered as one of the trimurti (trinity) of Nepali literature alongside Laxmi Prasad Devkota and Lekhnath Paudyal. He is often called the Shakespeare of Nepal.

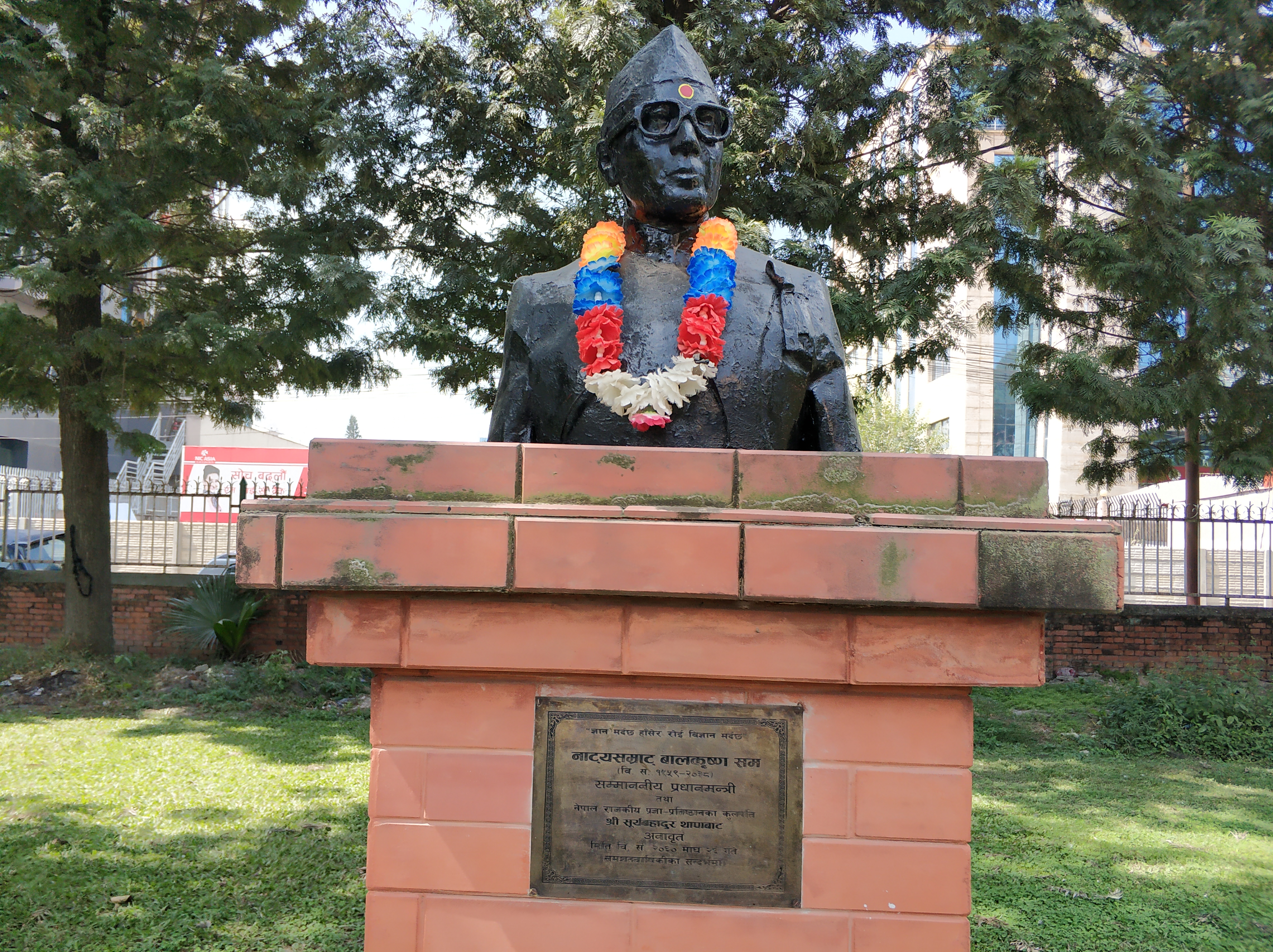
Statue of Balkrishna Sama at Nepal Academy Kamaladi, Kathmandu.

== Personal life ==
He was born on February 8, 1903, to General Samar Shumsher Jung Bahadur Rana and Kirtirajyalaksmi Rana in Gyaneshwar, Kathmandu. He married Mandakini in 1921. Sama was awarded the Tribhuwan Puraskar from Nepal Rajakiya Pragya Prathistan in 1972. The same year he received the Bishesh Upadhi from Tribhuvan University and in 1978, the Prithvi Pragya Puraskar from Pragya Pratisthan. He died in 1981.

== Education ==
Sama graduated from Durbar High School in Ranipokhari and studied science in Tri-Chandra College. During his second academic year, he was sent to Dehradoon for army training as a captain. After that, he became a lieutenant colonel under the premiership of Chandra Shumsher Rana, who was the Prime Minister of Nepal at the time.

== Writing career ==
A majority of his time, Sama was alone at home finding peace in solitude, gradually spending more time in art and literary activities. He started publishing his writings in reputed magazines such as Sarada, Udhyog, and Shahitya Shrot. Afterwards, he shortened his surname "Shumsher Jung Bahadur Rana" to "Sama" because he no longer wished to be associated with a ruling regime that had once governed Nepal under a dictatorship. His drama Bhater, published in Pragati in 1953, reflects his feelings on human rights.

== Notable works ==
Several of his plays have been inspired by Shakespeare's works. His dramas such as Prem Pinda, Swasni Manchhe, Buhartan, Tapobhumi, Atyadhunikta, and Bhater present the social context of the Rana era; Mukunda Indira, Ma and Mutuko Byatha show the emotional and romantic sides of Sama's personality. Amit Basana, Boksi, Talamathi, and Andhabeg are based on the topic of human psychology. His dramas on historical personalities, Amar Singh, Bhimsen Ko Antya, and Bhakta Bhanubhakta. Birami Ra Kuruwa is another drama dealing with philosophy, while Prahlad and Dhruba are based on religious figures.

During his time, Bal Krishna Sama became known as one of Nepal's greatest playwrights.

Sama also wrote stories, poems, essays, compositions, and biographies. His contemporaries Laxmi Prasad Devkota and Lekhnath Poudyal were involved in writing poetry. Aago Ra Paani and Chiso Chulho are his popular epics. He wrote an essay Nepal Lalit Kala on Nepalese art, as well as the biography Hamra Rastriya Bhibhutiharu and the two-part autobiography Mero Kabita Ko Aradhana. His best-known short story, Kaikai, was published in 1938. His short story collection book, Taltal, was published posthumously in 1990.

== Later work ==
He worked as a lecturer teaching Nepali language and literature at Tri Chandra College. In 1955, he became director of Nepal Radio and chief editor of the newspaper Gorkhapatra. In 1967, he became a member of the Royal Nepal Academy when it was established, and later as the vice chancellor.

Following his retirement in 1971, Sama continued writing, publishing many of his poems in nationally reputed magazines like Madhuparka and Ramjham. Many of his works remain unpublished or incomplete, many of which he read out during literary programmes. His unpublished dramas include Gangalal, Aja, Milinad, Prem, Chinta, and Prandaan.

== See also ==
- Laxmi Prasad Devkota
- Lekhnath Paudyal
