= Madhabi =

Nepali novel by Madan Mani Dixit

- Author: Madan Mani Dixit
- Original title: माधवी
- Language: Nepali
- Genre: Mythological fiction
- Publisher: Sajha Prakashan
- Publication date: 13 April 1983
- Publication place: Nepal
- Media type: Print (Paperback)
- Pages: 639
- Awards: Madan Puraskar; Sajha Puraskar
- ISBN: 99933-2-908-8
- OCLC: 610184696

Madhabi (Nepali: माधवी) is a 1983 Nepali mythological novel by Madan Mani Dixit. It was published on 13 April 1983 by Sajha Prakashan, and won the Madan Puraskar (2039 BS) for the same year. It is a retelling of the story of Madhabi and Gallav from Mahabharata. Written in a grandiose setting, the novel depicts the economic, social and political conditions of Vedic Indian society three thousand years ago. The original story is told in Mahabharat to Duryodhana to teach him about the result of stubbornness and how it can destroy life.

The book illustrates the evils of ancient Indian society, such as slavery and patriarchy, and the helplessness of a woman in a patriarchal society and her exploitation by men. Madhavi is used by multiple men throughout the book, but is neglected towards the end. The novel is considered a classic in Nepali literature.

== Background ==
Madan Mani Dixit, a journalist by trade, wrote the novel during the Panchayat rule in Nepal at a time when censorship was prevalent for writers and journalists. His newspaper Samikshaya was closed by the government. Dixit was dejected by the censorship and decided to self-immolate outside Narayanhiti palace on 16 December 1977 (1 Poush 2034 BS) but on the day of the planned suicide, he could not follow through on his plan. He thought that the act of censorship was not a crime that he had committed, and as such he should not be punished for it, instead he decided to start writing the story of Madhabi and Galav. He completed the manuscript in December 1982 (Poush 2039) and the book was published on 13 April 1983 (30 Chaitra 2039 BS) by Sajha Praksahan.

== Synopsis ==
The book is based on the Udyoga Parva of Mahabharat. When Galav refuses to give guru-dakshina to his teacher Guru Vishwamitra, Vishwamitra asks for four white horses with black ears. The horses are required in order to organize a Mahayagya for the abolition of slavery. Galav reaches the court of king Yayati, who is famous for his generosity and asks for his help to find the horses. Unable to gain those horses for Galav, Yayati decides to give away his daughter Madhabi in marriage to Galav. Madhabi is the daughter of king Yayati and an apsara, and is born with a divine power to remain a virgin forever.

Galav takes Madhabi to three different kings of whom Madhabi has sons with, and Madhabi is then able to become a virgin again. Galav asks for a horse in exchange of each son. When Galav returns to Vishwamitra with three white horses with black ears, Vishwamitra has a son with Madhabi for the remaining one horse. Their son, Ashtaka, goes on to become a great king, and Madhabi is sent back to her father. Yayati organizes a swayamvara for Madhabi, which Galav does not participate in. Madhabi, dejected by the neglect of Galav, decides to become a hermit and leaves for a forest. Galav also wanders through a different forest to find Madhabi.

== Characters ==
The novel's main characters are:

- Madhabi – Daughter of Yayati, the titular character of the book
- Galav – Madhabi's husband and disciple of Guru Vishwamitra
- Vishwamitra – Guru of Galav, a learned sage
- Yayati – a powerful Chandravanshi king and Madhabi's father
- Haryasva – king of Ayodhya
- Vasumanasa – son of Haryasva and Madhabi
- Divodasa – king of Kashi
- Pratardana – son of Divodasa and Madhabi
- Ushinara – king of Bhoja
- Sibi – son of Ushinara and Madhabi
- Pramatak – nephew of Vishwamitra
- Ashtaka – son of Pramatak and Madhavi, emperor of Champa mahajanapada

== Awards ==
The book won the Madan Puraskar for the year 2039 BS (1982/ 1983). The award was presented in a ceremony on 11 October 1983 (25 Ashwin 2040 BS).^{[Note a]} In the acceptance speech, Madan Mani said "... Madhavi of Vyas, you have been rewarded only now after thousands of years because you no longer have to sacrifice any infant in Varunavali, no need to be exchanged with horses, no need to obey Vishwamitra's orders and conceive a child with Pramatak and you don't have to leave room for the Galav's flowers in the garland you have weaved."^{[Note b]}

The book also won the Sajha Puraskar in the same year.

== See also ==
- Shirishko Phool
- Ranahar
- Yayati
- Madhavi

== Notes ==
- ^[Note a] All dates are manually converted from BS to CE.
- ^[Note b] Translated from Nepali; Original quote: "...व्यासकी माधवी, तिमी हजारौं वर्षपछि अहिले मात्र पुरस्कृत भयौ किनभने तिमीले वरुणावलिमा अब कुनै शिशुलाई अर्पित गर्नुपर्ने छैन, घोडाहरूसँग साटिनुपर्ने छैन, नियोगका निम्ति विश्वामित्रको आदेश पालन गरेर प्रमतकलाई स्वागत गर्नुपर्ने छैन र आफूले उनेको मालामा गालवका फूलका लागि ठाउँ छाड्दै जानुपर्ने छैन।"
