= Shankar Lamichhane =

Nepalese writer (1928 - 1976)

- शङ्कर लामिछाने
- Shankar Lamichhane
- Born: 17 March 1928; Jaisidewal, Kathmandu, Nepal
- Died: 24 January 1976 (aged 47)
- Education: Tri-Chandra College
- Occupation: Writer
- Notable work: Abstract Chintan Pyaj
- Spouses: Ratna Rai; Subarna Shrestha
- Parents: Harihar Prasad (Father); Raj Kumari (Mother)
- Awards: Madan Puraskar (1967)

Shankar Lamichhane (Nepali: शङ्कर लामिछाने; 1928 – 1976) was a Nepalese essayist and short–story writer. He is best known for his Madan Puraskar–winning essay collection Abstract Chintan Pyaj.

== Early life ==
He was born on 17 March 1928 (5 Chaitra 1984 BS) to father Hari Prasad Lamichhane and mother Raj Kumari in Jaisidewal, Kathmandu. Due to poor condition of his parents, his mother decided to take him and his brother to Banaras. His brother died after reaching Banaras. His mother started working as a teacher in Banaras and raised him but she died about a decade later. Lamichhane then moved back to Kathmandu. Lamichhane completed I.Sc. from Tri-Chandra College in Kathmandu.

== Literary career ==
Considered one of Nepal's foremost essayists of all times, Shankar Lamichhane wrote with a lyrical, musical tempo, unrestrained by the ponderous language that often mars the essays of his elders, peers or followers. He died an untimely death, but had stopped writing before that, discouraged by an anonymous accusation of plagiarism, an accusation he accepted, but which is still deliberated over by critics. That Lamichhane's fresh, playful style greatly enriched Nepali literature is, however, indisputable. His collection Abstract Chintan: Pyaz shows off his light touch in dealing with both intimate and metaphysical subjects.

== Notable works ==
- Abstract Chintan Pyaj (1967; essays anthology)
- Gaunthali ko Gund (Short stories)
- Godhuli Sansar (1970; Anthology of essays)
- Shankar Lamichhane ka Nibanadaharu (Anthology of essays)
- Bimba Pratibimba (Literary essays)
- Shankar Lamichhane Aatmakatha (Autobiography)

== Awards and honours ==
He won the Madan Puraskar for his anthology of essays Abstract Chintan Pyaj. Shankar Lamichhane Essay Society was established in his honor.

== Personal life and death ==
He married Ratna Rai from Darjeeling. They had two children. He then remarried Subarna Shrestha, with whom he had two children.

Lamichhane died on 24 January 1976 (10 Magh 2032 BS) at the age of 47.

== See also ==
- Lain Singh Bangdel
- Parijat
- Bhupi Sherchan
- Laxmi Prasad Devkota
