= List of Nepalese scientists =

Lowercase

The following is a list of noted scientists from Nepal. The list, however, is not exclusive of foreign scientists of Nepalese origin or ones with dual nationalities.

== B ==
- Binil Aryal
- Bishal Nath Upreti

== D ==
- Dayananda Bajracharya

== G ==
- Gehendra Shumsher

== J ==
- Jiban Shrestha

== K ==
- Kamal Prasad Sapkota

== L ==
- Lujendra Ojha

== R ==
- Dr. Rabindra Pandey

== S ==
- Shankar Prasad Shrestha
- Sanduk Ruit

== T ==
- Tej Kumar Shrestha

== U ==
- Udayraj Khanal

== Y ==
- Yadav Pandit

== See also ==
- Science and technology in Nepal
- List of scientists
