= Science and technology in Nepal =

Science and technology in Nepal is a relatively small, but emerging sector. The Ministry of Education, Science and Technology is a governmental body of Nepal responsible for overseeing the development of education, science and technology within the country.

Nepal is a developing country, that deals with problems like poverty, illiteracy, and unemployment. Consequently, science and technology are not prioritized by the government. The lack of quality education from Nepalese university causes students to go abroad to study and half of them do not return.

Nepal was ranked 107th in the Global Innovation Index in 2025.

== History ==
Ancient kingdoms that existed in the Kathmandu Valley were found to have made use of some technologies in numerous areas such as architecture, agriculture, civil engineering, and water management. The Gopals and Abhirs, who ruled the valley up until c. 1000 BC, used temporary materials for construction such as bamboo, hay, and timber. The Kirat period (700 BC – 110 AD) employed the technology of brick firing, as well as produced woolen shawls. Stupas, idols, canals, self-recharging ponds, and reservoirs, constructed during the Lichhavi era (110 AD – 879 AD) are intact to this day. The Malla period (1200 AD – 1768 AD) further saw a growth in architecture, comparable with other advanced contemporary nations. An archetypal example of Malla architecture is Nyatapola, a five-storied, 30-meter tall temple in Bhaktapur, which has survived at least four major earthquakes, including the April 2015 Nepal earthquake.

Nepal was a late entrant into the modern world of science and technology. Nepal’s first institution of higher education, Tri-Chandra College, was established by Chandra Shumsher in 1918. The college introduced science at the intermediate level a year later, marking the genesis of formal science education in the country. The college was not accessible to the general public but only to a handful of members of the Rana regime. Throughout the Rana regime that lasted for well over a century, Nepal was effectively isolated from the rest of the world. Owing to this isolation, Nepal was relatively untouched by and unfamiliar of social transformations brought about by the British invasion in India and the Industrial Revolution in the West. However, after the advent of democracy and abolition of Rana regime in 1951, Nepal ended its self-imposed isolation and opened up to the outside world. The opening marked the initiation of science and technology activities in the country, with Tribhuvan University, the first of its kind in the country, soon coming into being in 1959. By 1965, the university offered postgraduate programs in natural sciences, namely physics, chemistry, zoology, and botany.

== National policy ==
=== Overview: policy implementation and challenges ===
Nepal has historically set low targets for research intensity, limiting the effectiveness of sectoral policies, although sectoral science and technology policies have been adopted since the early 2000s.

A number of planned initiatives have failed to materialize. These include a national fund for research in information and communication technologies proposed by the National Information and Communication Technology Policy (2015) and a national biotechnology research centre proposed by the Biotechnology Policy (2006), as well as three other planned research centres: the national nanotechnology centre, nuclear research centre and space research institute.

The Nuclear Policy was adopted in 2007, and in 2019 parliament adopted the Nuclear Act facilitating the peaceful use of nuclear science and technology transfer for the health and environmental sectors. Despite the Renewable Energy Subsidy Policy (2016) having introduced subsidies for mini- and microhydropower, solar and wind energy through its delivery mechanism, the Central Renewable Energy Fund, the share of this type of energy in final energy consumption actually dropped between 2015 and 2019, from 11% to 5% of the total. By 2019, installed hydropower capacity (1,250 MW) fell short of the target (2,301 MW) for the same year. Most hydropower projects have fallen behind schedule, adding to the cost of developing this infrastructure.

A common grievance of the Nepali scientific community is that, despite the design of policies, poor implementation, coupled with a lack of resources, has resulted in unmet expectations. For instance, plans to create a smart city or to digitize Nepal have not materialized.

Absences of effective policy implementation have caused others to deliver knowledge transfer and technological absorption, including through public–private partnerships. Examples are the National Innovation Centre, created through crowdsourcing organized by individuals in 2012 and constructed on land donated by Tribhuvan University in 2019; the Centre for Molecular Dynamics Nepal (est. 2007), created through a non-governmental organization (NGO); and the Smart Urban Technology Challenge, a public–private partnership involving the Kathmandu municipality that organizes regular competitions for entrepreneurial teams to solve problems related to urban development.

=== National Science Technology and Innovation Policy (2019) ===
The National Science, Technology and Innovation Policy (2019) identifies six priority areas: industrial research; agriculture and land use; infrastructure development; optimum use of biodiversity and mining; climate change and disaster management; and better governance.

The policy has pinpointed a number of challenges for science governance, such as a lack of political leadership, a weak administrative capacity and poor co-ordination between line ministries. To improve co-ordination, the Ministry of Science and Technology was merged with the Ministry of Education in 2018, forming the Ministry of Education, Science and Technology.

Despite receiving the majority of public research budgets, most research institutes are largely bureaucratic, with little investment in dedicated research. There is also an absence of mission-oriented research programmes to meet national economic objectives.

The National Science, Technology and Innovation Policy (2019) has proposed creating a science, technology and innovation fund but, as of late 2020, no budget had yet been allocated to such a fund, which requires responsive institutions and adequate funding.

The same is true for the Three-Year Plan (2016–2018) and Fifteenth Five-Year Plans (2019–2023), where responsive institutions and adequate funding will be necessary to reach the targets in the Three-Year Plan of a 35% gross enrolment rate in higher education and a 65% Internet connectivity rate by 2018. The plan also foresees support for start-ups through the creation of business incubators at universities and the creation of 11,000 jobs in science and engineering by 2018.

The government’s objectives for the Fifteenth Five-Year Plan covering the period from 2019 to 2023 inculcate a science culture and evidence-based research, using science and technology to enhance living standards, promoting emerging technologies and supporting linkages between industry and academia, including with entrepreneurs.

Nepal still lacks a robust system of data collection for indicators related to science, technology and innovation. For instance, it does not measure the national research effort on a regular basis. No innovation survey has ever been conducted, nor any systematic attempt made to measure the business sector’s contribution to research and development, particularly at a time when value addition by manufacturing to the economy has slipped beneath the 5% threshold since peaking at 9% in 1996, according to World Bank data.

=== Remuneration and outward mobility ===
University students in Nepal tend to major in STEM fields. However, they are leaving Nepal in growing numbers. Outbound student mobility increased by 68% from 2012 to 2017 to 49 451 students, 29% (14 445) of whom headed for North America and Western Europe. In the 2016/2017 academic year, Nepal was the 13th biggest supplier of international students to the USA. Of these, 54% enrolled at US universities at undergraduate level and 34% in graduate programmes. The US Chamber of Commerce has estimated the economic contribution of these Nepali students at US$ 369 million.

Salaries and grants offered by Nepali institutions are insufficient to retain graduates. For instance, nearly half of advertised positions at the Nepal Agriculture Research Council remained vacant in 2018. The three-year PhD fellowships provided by the University Grant Commission amount to Rs 8,000 (less than US$ 70) per month.

The Nepalese National Academy of Science and Technology has initiated the Return Scientists, Return Home programme (Farka Hai Farka Baigyanik), to foster ties between the government and the diaspora. However, interviews conducted by Osama, Sha and Wickremaisnghe in 2020 suggest that this programme has elicited little response from scientists working abroad. The programme has been unable to propose financial incentives, such as support for setting up a laboratory in Nepal, or to offer the diaspora an opportunity to contribute to existing research programmes run by the academy in nanotechnology, biotechnology, molecular research, environmental science and other fields.

== Research trends ==
Nepal has fallen short of its 2019 target of 0.62% for research intensity, as this still stood at 0.3% in 2019, according to the government's own figures.

Over 2015–2019, the number of scientific publications from Nepal indexed in the Scopus database rose from 939 to 1,665. More than half (60%) of publications published over 2017–2019 were in the broad field of health sciences.

Over 2015–2018, the number of patents granted to Nepali inventors from the world's top five patent offices rose by c. 330% (62 to 265 patents). In 2019, the number of patents granted dipped to 199.

== Research institutions ==
Some of the eminent scientific research institutions in the country include:

- Nepal Academy of Science and Technology (NAST)
- Research Centre for Applied Science and Technology (RECAST)
- Centre for Environmental and Agricultural Policy Research (CEAPR)
- Nepal Agricultural Research Council (NARC)

== Notable people ==
Some of the notable Nepali people in the field of science and technology include:

- Dayananda Bajracharya
- Bodhraj Acharya
- Binil Aryal
- Bishal Nath Upreti
- Gehendra Shumsher
- Lujendra Ojha
- Mahabir Pun
- Niranjan Parajuli
- Ram I. Mahato
- Sanduk Ruit
- Tej Kumar Shrestha
- Udayraj Khanal
- Yadav Pandit

== Sources ==
This article incorporates text from a free content work. Licensed under CC BY-SA 3.0 IGO (license statement/permission). Text taken from UNESCO Science Report: the Race Against Time for Smarter Development, 574–603, UNESCO Publishing.
