= Kedar Lal Shrestha =

Nepalese physicist and academic (1938–2020)

Dr. Kedar Lal Shrestha (Nepali: केदारलाल श्रेष्ठ) was a physicist and academic from Nepal. He was born on 23 October 1938 in Lalitpur, Nepal. He served various governmental and non-governmental agencies including policy making of Kathmandu Metropolitan. He died in 2020.

== Biography ==
Shrestha was born as a single child of father Ratna Lal Shrestha and mother Hari Devi Shrestha. He did his schooling from Patan High School. He completed ISc from Trichandra College and MSc from Allahabad University in 1960 with physics as a major. He received a PhD from Queensland University in 1967.

After PhD, he started as a professor in physics in Tribhuwan University. He worked as department head from 1971 to 1986. From 1979 to 1986, he worked for RECAST. He also worked as vice president in Nepal Academy of Science and Technology from 1992 to 1997.

He has two sons and two daughters.

He died in 2020 at the age of 82 in Kathmandu.
