= Ghanta Ghar (Kathmandu) =

- घन्टाघर
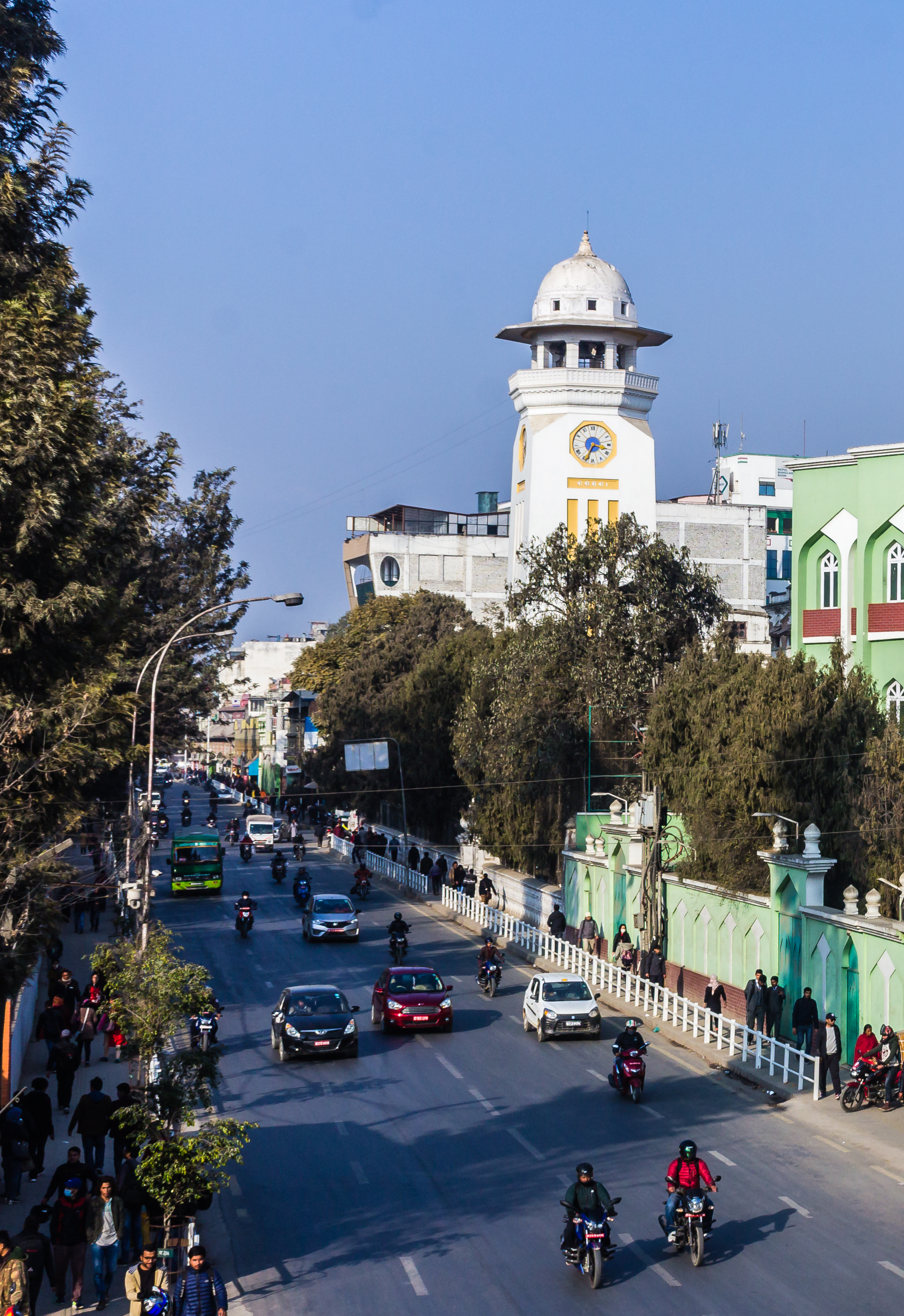
- Ghanta Ghar in January 2018

- Location in Kathmandu, Nepal

General information
- Status: Rebuilt after 1934 Earthquake
- Location: Kathmandu, Nepal
- Coordinates: 27.7074742°N 85.3147146°E

Design and construction
- Architect: Bir Shumsher

The Ghanta Ghar (घन्टाघर), situated in the capital city of Kathmandu, is the oldest clock tower of Nepal. It lies in front of Rani Pokhari and near Trichandra College. It was built by Rana Prime Minister Bir Shumsher. The original clock tower was designed after Big Ben of London, as Western influence crept into Nepalese architecture during the Rana era. The GhantaGhar that stands today was rebuilt after the 1990 BS earthquake, standing on the site of the original after the old tower was destroyed by the earthquake.

== Etymology ==
The name Ghanta Ghar is made up of two Nepali words, "Ghanta" and "Ghar", which mean "Hour" and "House" in English respectively.

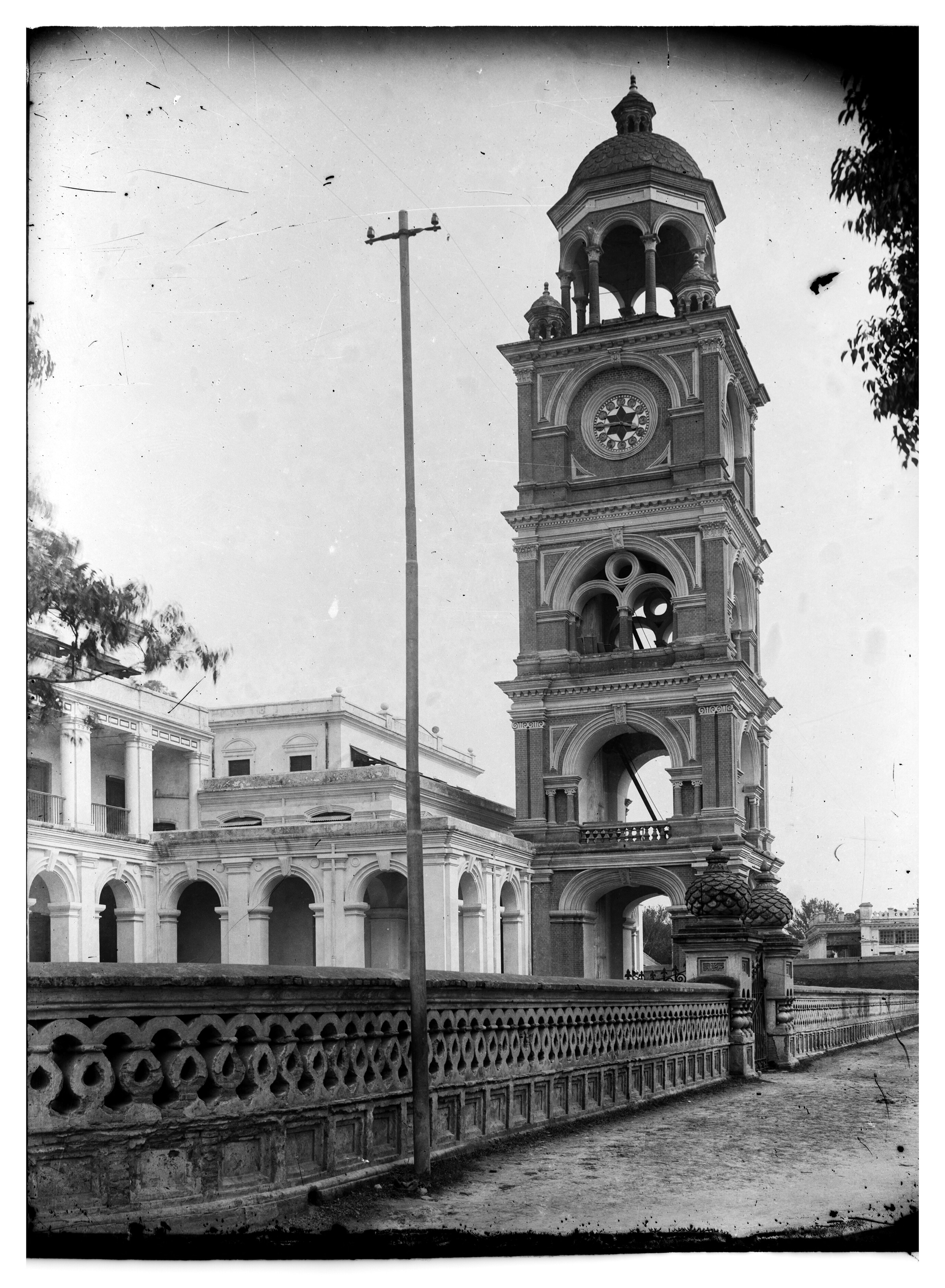
Ghanta Ghar in its original style of architecture in the mid 1920s
