= Yadunath Khanal =

Nepali diplomat, government minister, scholar and author

Sardar Yadunath Khanal
- यदुनाथ खनाल

Ambassador of Nepal to China
- In office 1978 – 1982
- Monarch: Birendra of Nepal

Chairman of the Public Service Commission
- In office 1975 – 1977
- Monarch: Birendra of Nepal

Ambassador of Nepal to the United States
- In office April 27, 1973 – May 1975
- Monarch: Birendra of Nepal
- President: Richard Nixon

Foreign Secretary of Nepal
- In office 1967 – 1970
- Monarch: Mahendra of Nepal

Ambassador of Nepal to India
- In office 1962 – 1967
- Monarch: Mahendra of Nepal

Personal details
- Born: August 12, 1913 Tanahun District, Kingdom of Nepal
- Died: October 2, 2004 (aged 91)

Sardar Yadu Nath Khanal (August 1913 – 2 October 2004) was a pioneer Nepali diplomat, government minister, scholar and author in the modern history of Nepal.

He is often regarded as the great pioneer to formulate the foreign policy of Nepal. Nepal is sandwiched between the two giants China and India. He was the diplomatic consultant to the government on external affairs since the time of Late King Mahendra to Late Prime Minister Girija Prasad Koirala.

He was born in Tanahun, Nepal. At an early age he migrated with his family to Kathmandu. Yadunath initially was an instructor at Tri Chandra College, Kathmandu. Later he entered into government service, serving as ambassador to China, India and the United States, and as foreign secretary. He was the father of Udayraj Khanal, who is an eminent professor at Tribhuvan University.

== Publications ==
- Reflections on Nepal-India Relations (1964)
- Stray Thoughts (1966)
- Nepal, Transition from Isolationism (1977)
- Essays in Nepal's Foreign Affairs (1988)
- Nepal After Democratic Restoration (1996)
- Nepal in 1997: Political stability eludes (1998)
- Nepal in 1984: A Year of Complacence (1985)
- Nepal in 1972: A Search for a New Base-camp?
- Nepal and Non-alignment (1985)
- Background of Nepals' Foreign Policy (1998)
- Nepal's Non-isolationist Foreign Policy (2000)
- Nepal and Non-alignment (1985)
- Khanal, Yadu Nath. "Nepalko Parrashtra Nlti—Aadhunlk Charan." Nepal's Foreign Policy—Modern Phase"), in GN Sharma (ed.) (2017): 20-29.
- Khanal, Yadu Nath. "Soolal Values in Development." Address delivered to the Society for International Development, Nepal (1987).
- Khanal, Yadu Nath. "Dakshin Asiali Sahayog—Ek Chintan (South Asian Cooperation—Some Reflections)." Gorkhapatra yr 86.252 (1987): 2.
- Khanal, Yadu Nath. "Nepal in the Afro-Asian Movement." Afro-Asian and World Affairs 1 (1964): 193-197.
- Khanal, Yadunath. "Nepal Between India and China: An Aspect of the Evolving International Balance in Asia." (1971).
