= Udayraj Khanal =

Nepali physicist

- उदयराज खनाल
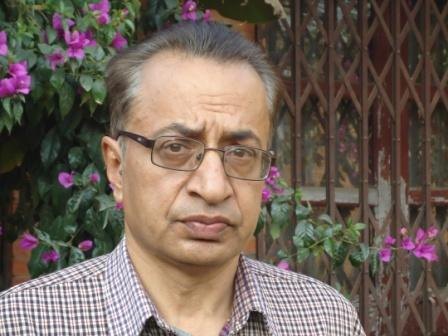
- Born: 14 January 1955
- Education: Physics (Ph.D.)
- Alma mater: Delhi University (Ph.D., M.Phil.); Florida Atlantic University (B.Sc.)
- Scientific career
- Fields: Cosmology; Science communication
- Institutions: Tribhuvan University

Udayaraj Khanal (Nepali: उदयराज खनाल; born 14 January 1955) is a Nepali physicist specializing in cosmology. Having worked in the Central Department of Physics for 34 years, he is now an emeritus professor at Tribhuvan University. As a working professor, he taught mathematical physics, General relativity and cosmology to graduate students. Moreover, he was also actively engaged in the development of theoretical physics curriculum offered by the department.

Khanal is also a prominent science writer in Nepal, having written articles for Kantipur, Annapurna Post, and Himal Khabarpatrika. His articles tend to communicate science and its importance to a wider general Nepali populace. He has been the author or co-author of over 15 scientific publications.

== Early life ==
Khanal was born to Yadunath and Kamala Khanal on 14 January 1955. His father, Yadunath Khanal, was a pioneer Nepali diplomat who served as the Nepali ambassador to India, China, and the United States.

== Career ==
Khanal received his PhD in astrophysics from Delhi University. He joined the physics department of Tribhuvan University in 1982 and retired in 2016. His style of lecturing was widely revered by his students and colleagues alike. He also teaches in Rato Bangala School, Patan Dhoka, Lalitpur.

== Awards and honours ==
Khanal has been the recipient of numerous national and international awards; some of which include:

- Excellent Service Award, Tribhuvan University (2002)
- Education Day Award (1993)
- Young Scientist Award, Nepal Academy of Science and Technology (1989)
- UGC Junior Research Fellow, Delhi University (1981)

== Popularity ==
Dr. Khanal has appeared several times in Nepali Television sets as well as public forums where he discussed about science and try to solve popular misconceptions prevailing in Nepali Society.

== See also ==
- Institute of Science and Technology, TU
- List of Nepalese scientists
- Science and technology in Nepal
