= Rani Pokhari =

Nepalese pond built in 1670

- 𑐴𑑂𑐣𑐹 𑐥𑐸𑐏𑐹 (Newar); रानी पोखरी (Nepali)
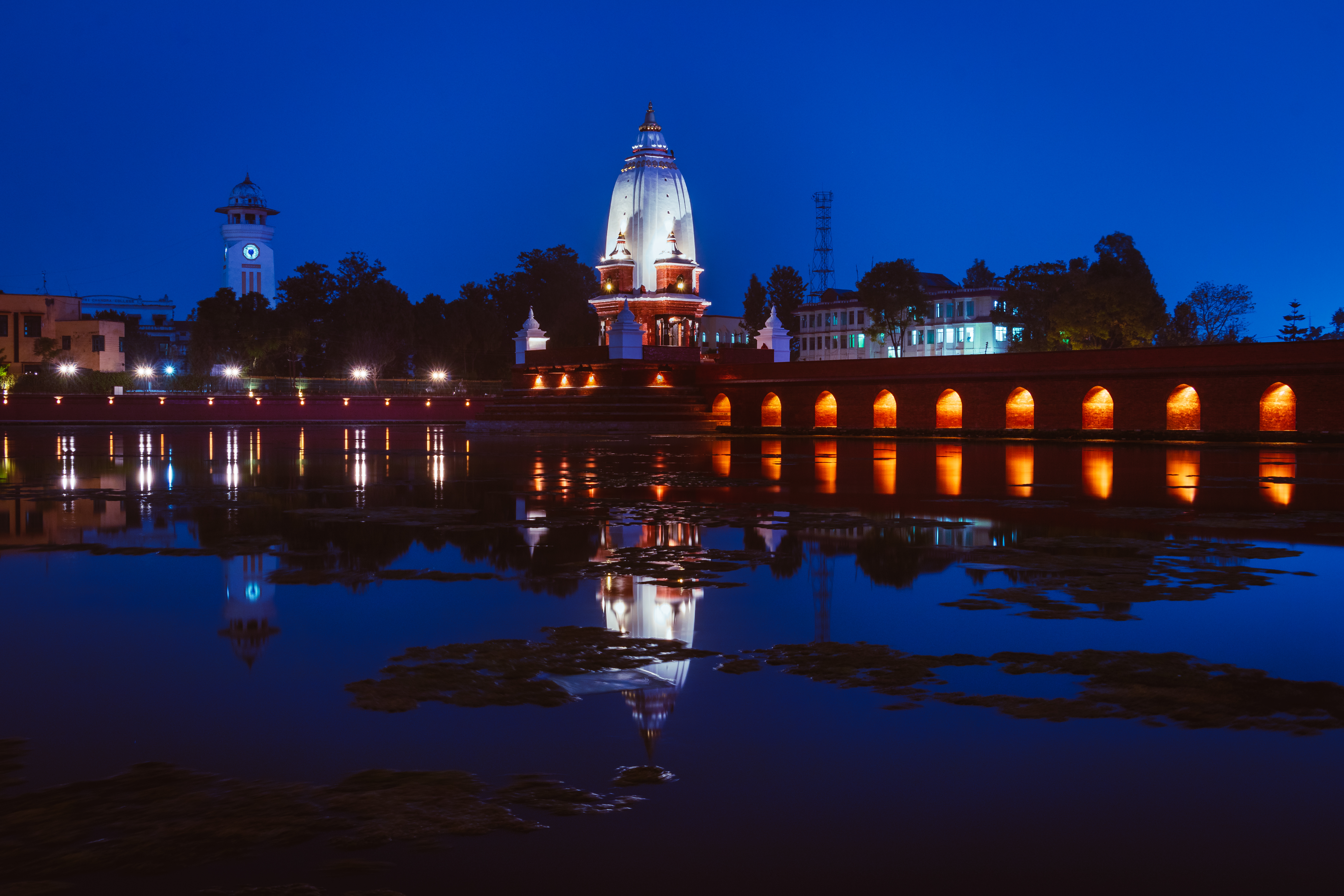
- Rani Pokhari in 2020 after restoration

- Location of Rani Pokhari in Nepal
- Interactive map of Rani Pokhari
- Location: Kathmandu, Nepal
- Coordinates: 27.707847°N 85.315447°E
- Type: Pond
- Built: 1670; 356 years ago
- Surface area: 7.7 acres (3.1 ha)
- Water volume: 30,000,000 litres (6,600,000 imp gal; 7,900,000 US gal)

Rani Pokhari (Nepali: रानी पोखरी; lit. queen's pond), originally known as Nhu Pukhu (Newar: 𑐴𑑂𑐣𑐹 𑐥𑐸𑐏𑐹; lit. new pond), is a historic artificial pond located in the heart of Kathmandu, Nepal. The square-shaped tank dates from the 17th century, and was built on the then eastern limits of the city. It lies just outside a former city gate. The pond is one of Kathmandu's most famous landmarks and is known for its religious and aesthetic significance. Its dimensions are 180m by 140m.

== Construction ==
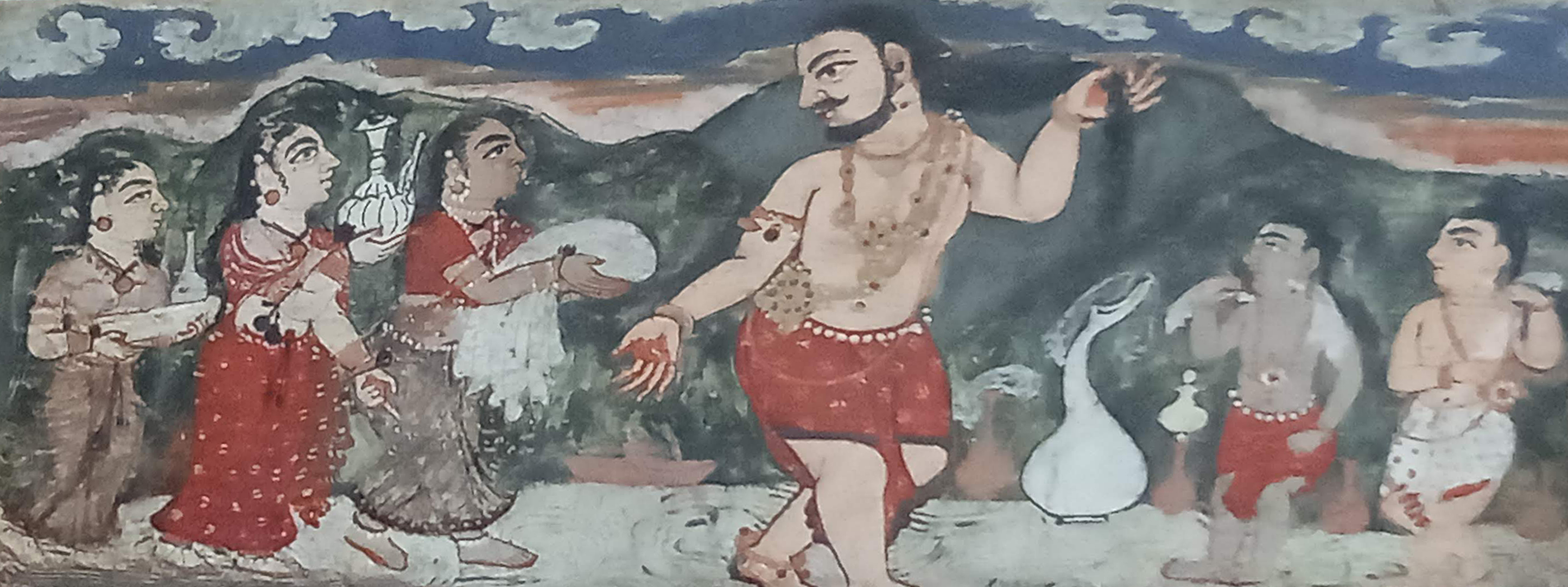
Manuscript painting showing King Pratap Malla collecting water from sacred sites for Rani Pokhari.

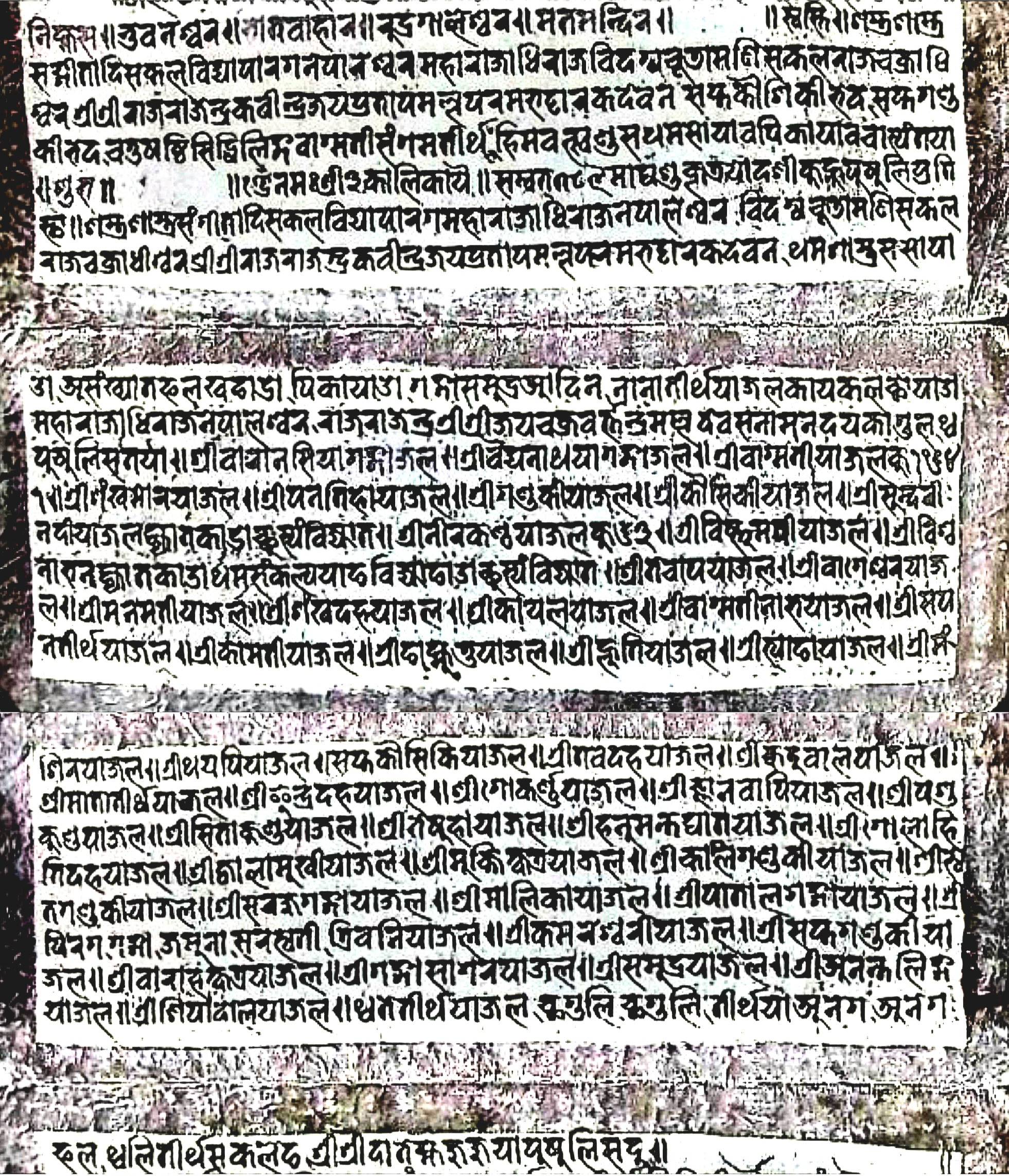
Tirthajatra manuscript, an account of the consecration of Rani Pokhari written by King Pratap Malla.

Rani Pokhari was built in 1670 AD by Pratap Malla, one of the most illustrious monarchs of the Malla dynasty that ruled Nepal for more than 600 years. Pratap Malla had the tank constructed to console his queen who was distraught with grief after their son was trampled to death by an elephant. He had water collected from various holy places and river confluences in Nepal and India like Gosaikunda, Muktinath, Badrinath, Kedarnath and poured into the pond to sanctify it.

=== Sources of the water ===
The pond is recharged by water flowing in through an underground channel, but there are also seven wells inside the pond.

=== Inscription ===
King Pratap Malla installed a stone slab at Rani Pokhari with writings in three languages: Sanskrit, Nepali and Nepal Bhasa. It is dated Nepal Sambat 790 (1670 AD) and describes the construction of Rani Pokhari and its religious significance. It also mentions five Brahmins, five Pradhans (Chief-ministers) and five Khas Magars as being witnesses.

=== Temples and elephant statue ===
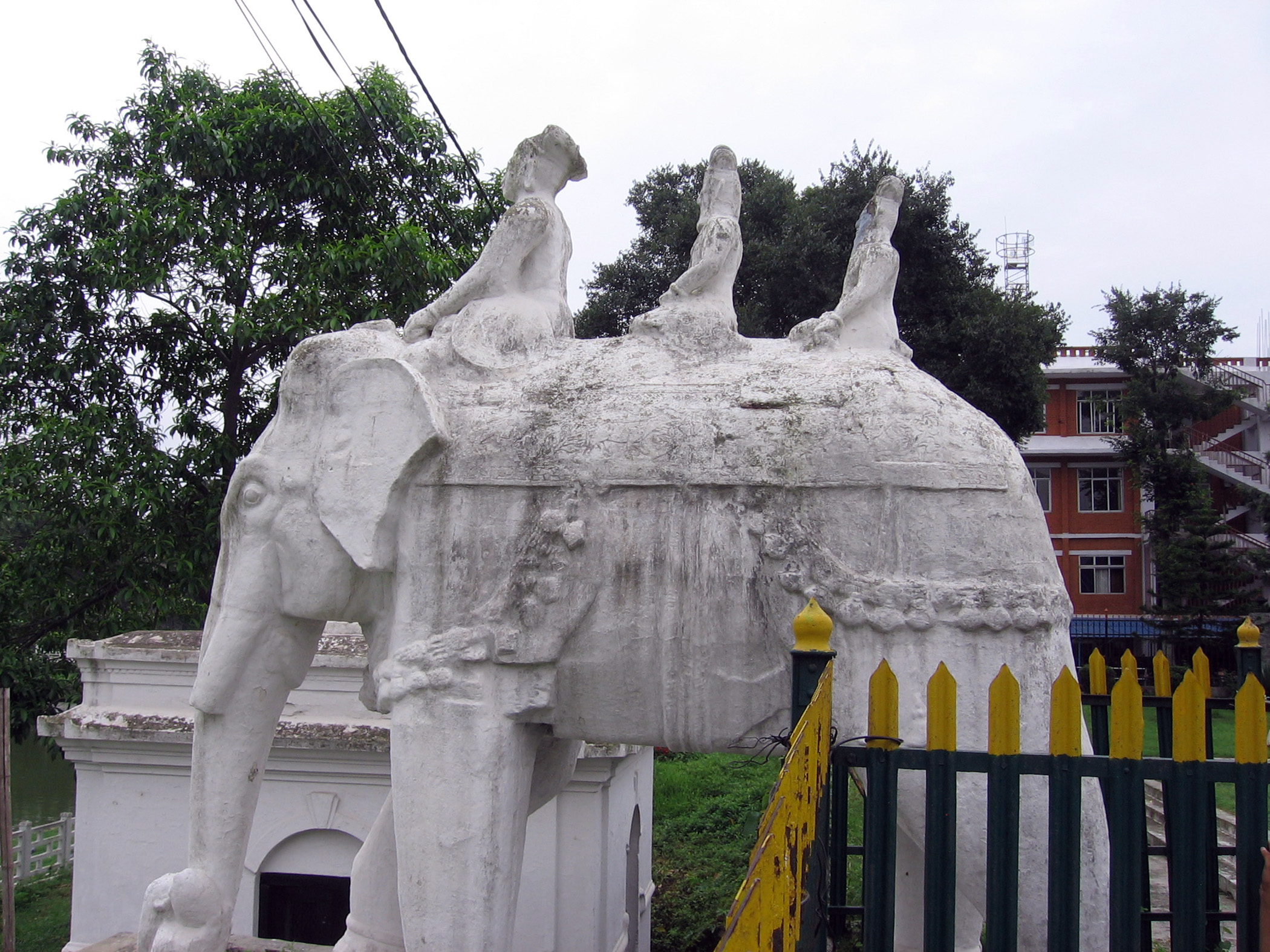
King Pratap Malla with his sons on an elephant at Rani Pokhari.

A temple dedicated to Matrikeshwor Mahadev, a form of the Hindu deity Shiva, stands at the center of the pond. There is an idol of Harishankari, which is said to be the only one idol of both Saraswoti and Laxmi. It is reached from the street by a causeway. A large stone statue of an elephant bearing the images of Pratap Malla and his two sons Chakravartendra Malla and Mahipatendra Malla is situated on the tank's southern embankment.

There are four smaller temples situated at the four corners of the pond: Bhairava temples in the northwest and northeast, Mahalaxmi Temple in the southeast and Ganesh Temple in the southwest. The temples on the eastern side now lie within the compounds of Tri Chandra College and a police station which has undermined their cultural importance.

=== Dhunge dharas ===
During recent excavations, four dhunge dharas were found, one at each of the four corners of the pond.

During the construction of the Ratnapark Subway, starting in 1984, Nhera hiti was discovered. Some of the stone spouts are now in the National Museum of Nepal. An unnamed dhunge dhara is known to be buried on the premises of the Nepal Electricity Authority (NEA). Then there is Swora hiti or Tin Dhara at Durbar Marg. The fourth dhunge dhara is named Jhanga hiti. It is located in Jamal, on the north-western corner of Rani Pokhari. Of these four dhunge dharas, only Swora hiti is in working order.

== Chhath and Tihar ==
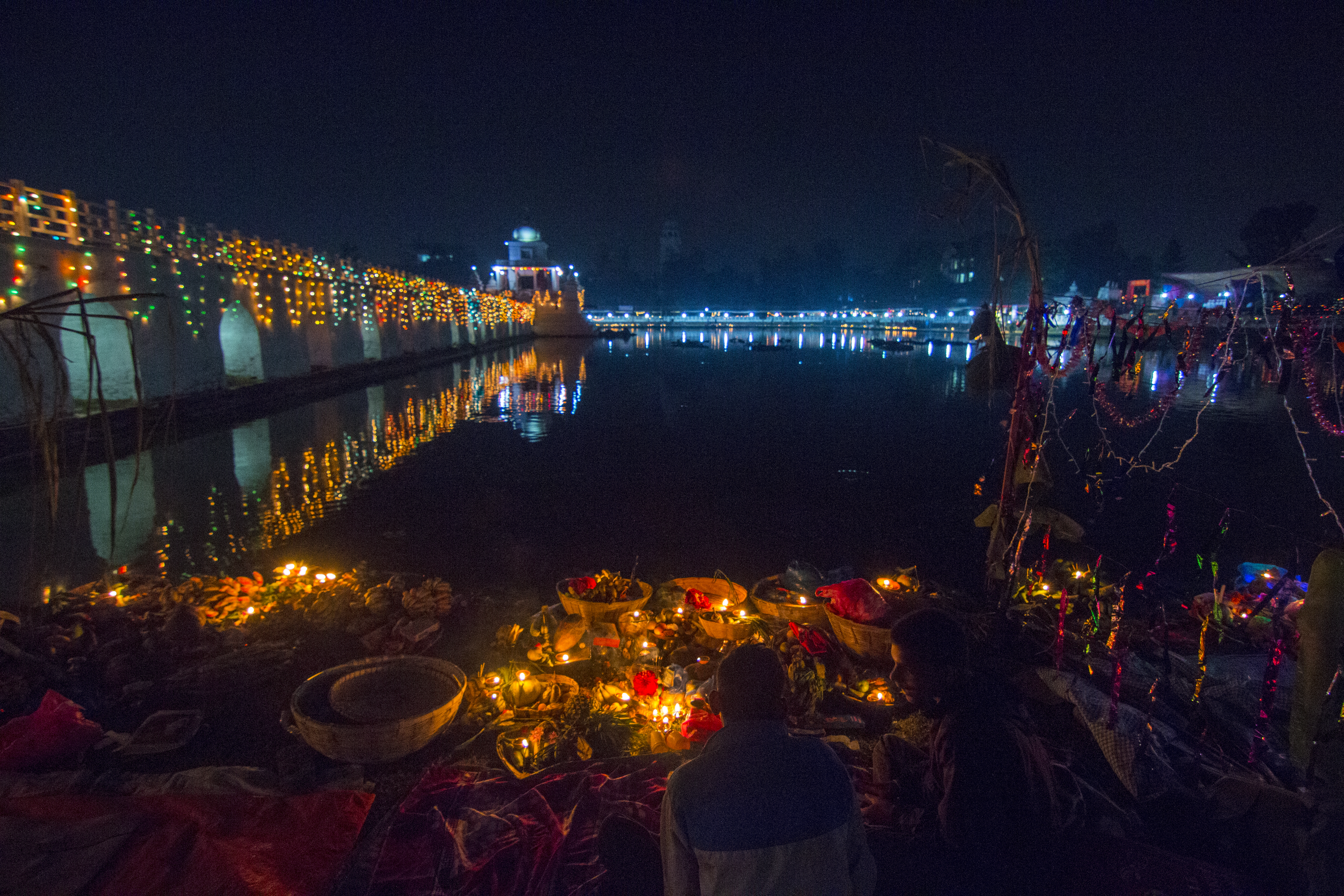
Chhath celebration at Rani Pokhari

The temple at the centre of the lake is open to the public only once a year: during the Yamapanchak or Tihar, the Festival of Lights. Traditionally, it opens on the Day of "Bhaitika" when sisters bless brothers for longevity and good health.

Rani Pokhari is fenced with iron bars and is opened once a year during Bhai Tika, the fifth and final day of the Tihar, and Chhath festival. The world's largest Chhath festival takes place every year in Rani Pokhari. Rani Pokhari is also dedicated to Nepalese Women who go into the cold water and pray to the Sun God.

== Western references ==
Among the earliest references to Rani Pokhari is an account by Italian Jesuit Ippolito Desideri who visited Kathmandu in 1721 when Nepal was ruled by the Malla kings. He was travelling from Tibet to India, and has mentioned in his travelogue seeing a large pond outside the main city gate with flights of steps and banks sloping down to the water. The father has also written that there was a tall column at the center resting on a magnificent pedestal.

The British Indian Army officer William Kirkpatrick, who visited Kathmandu in 1793, wrote about a quadrangular reservoir of water situated near the northeastern part of the city. He also noted the existence of many temples on the sides of Rani Pokhari, some of which were of considerable height and size.

== Controversial upgrade ==
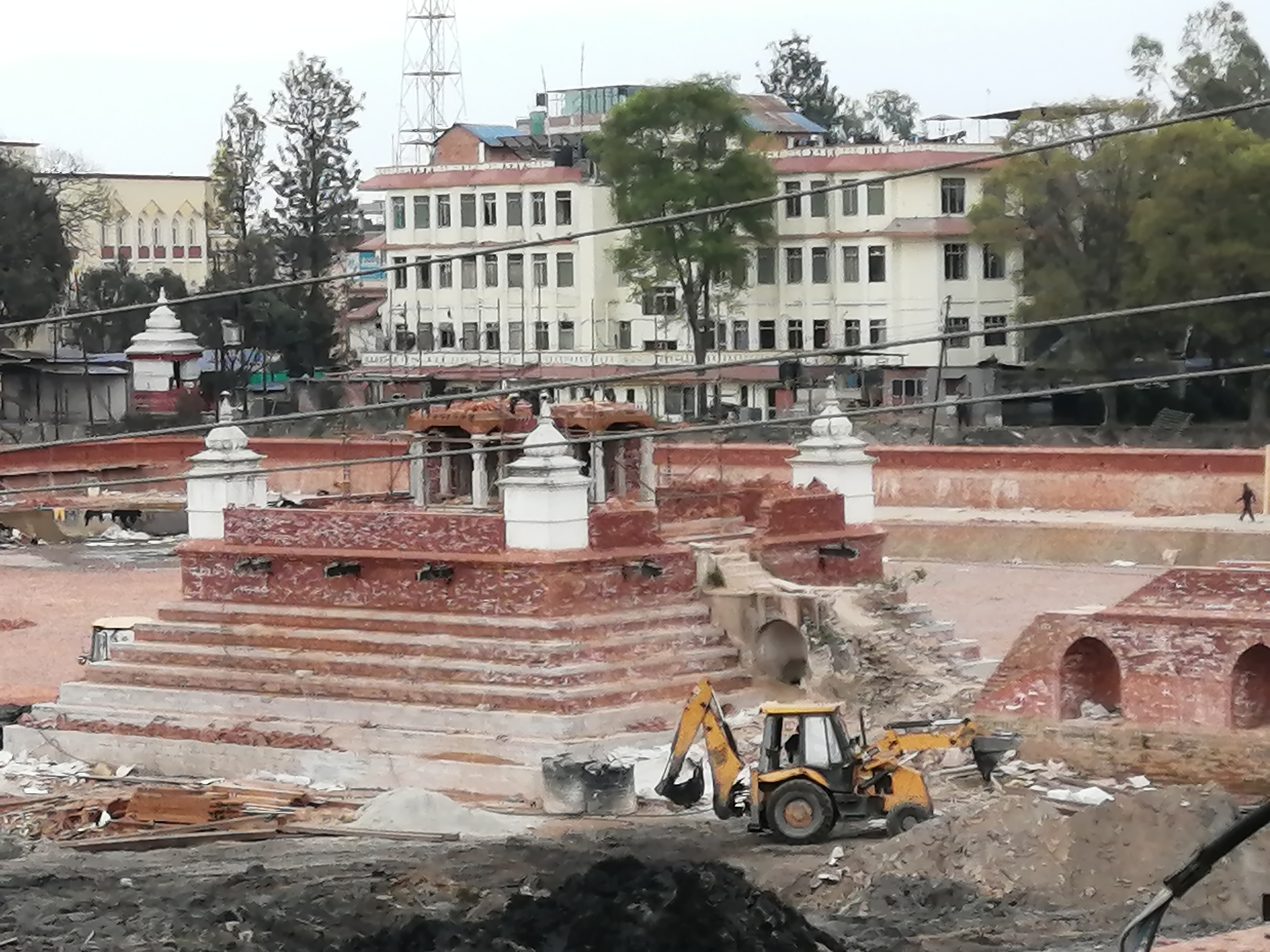
Ranipokhari being restored with bricks instead of concrete

Restoration work on Ranipokhari after the 2015 earthquake began in January 2016 and has been fraught with controversy. The original plans used concrete for the restoration, instead of the traditional brick and clay, and included fountains and a new lakeside café. After a series of local protests it was decided to restore the pond to the way it was in 1670. The reconstruction was completed in October 2020.

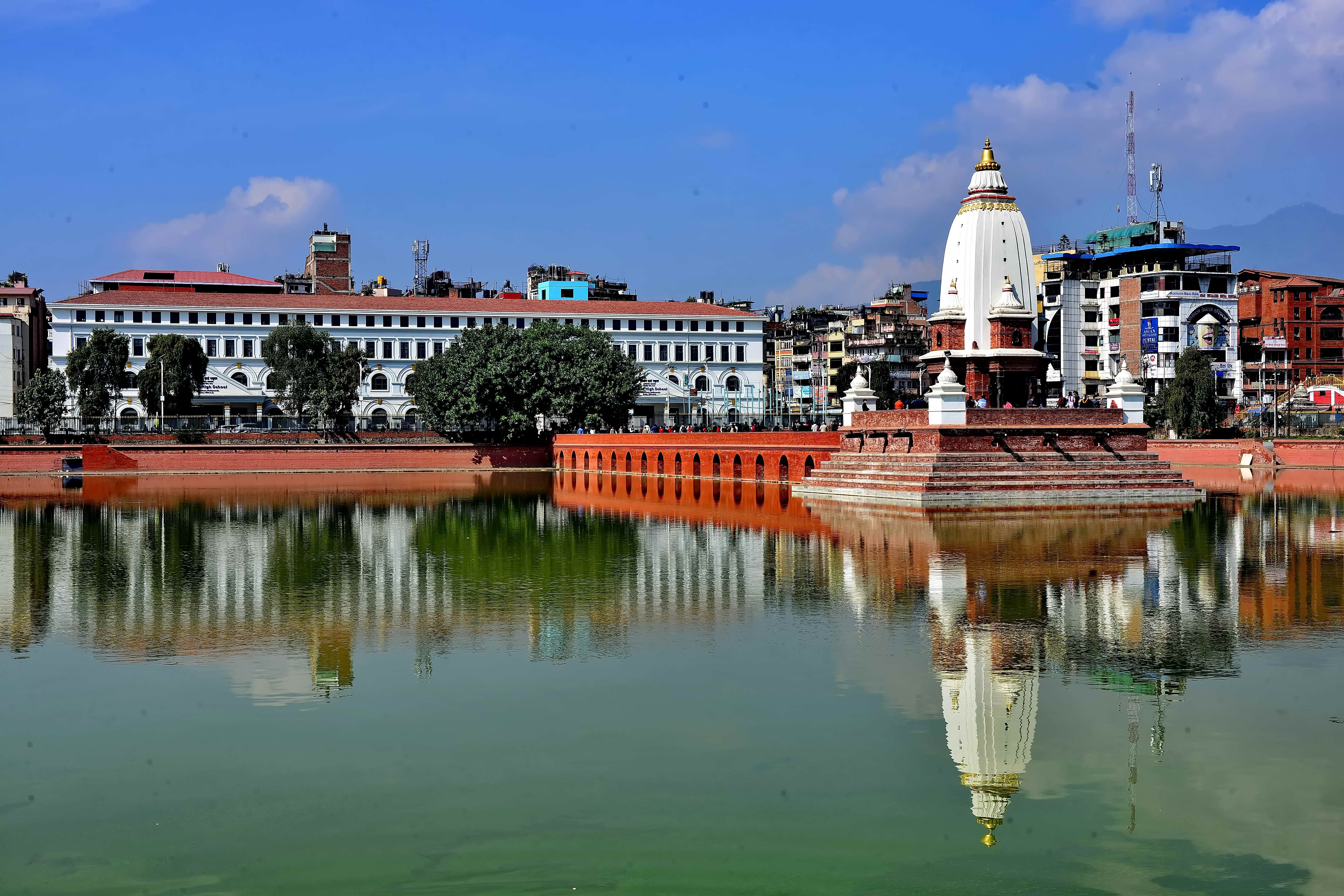
Rani Pokhari in 2021 after the reconstruction

The reconstruction saw a change in the colour scheme as well as the style of architecture used for the temple in the middle of the lake. It was in dome style before the 2015 earthquake while the reconstructed temple of Matrikeshwor Mahadev is in the Shikhara style of ancient architecture. The change was because the Ranipokhari had a similar temple during the construction period. The temple was rebuilt twice during the Rana period. The dome style of the temple we saw before the earthquake was a form of the same Rana period. The present renovation has restored the temple to its original form.

== Famous structures ==
Rani Pokhari is surrounded by historical buildings and famous structures. The clock tower Ghanta Ghar is situated across the road on the eastern side of the pond. The original clock tower, which had a more elaborate architecture, was destroyed during the Great earthquake of 1934. The present clock tower was built after the earthquake. It stands on the premises of Tri Chandra College, the first college in the country which was established in 1918 AD.

On the western side of Rani Pokhari stands another historical building, Durbar High School, built in 1854 AD. It is the first school in Nepal providing education along modern lines. In the beginning, Durbar High School admitted only the children of the ruling classes. It was opened to the general public in 1902 AD.

Tundikhel, a parade ground and ceremonial grass field and a Kathmandu landmark, formerly extended from the southern side of Rani Pokhari. A section next to the pond was fenced off and converted into a public park and flower garden in the mid-1960s.

== Historical gallery ==
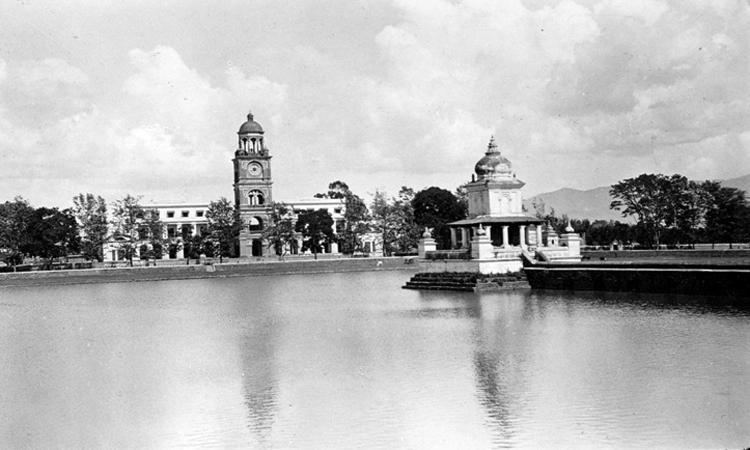
Rani Pokhari and clock tower from the west before the 1934 earthquake

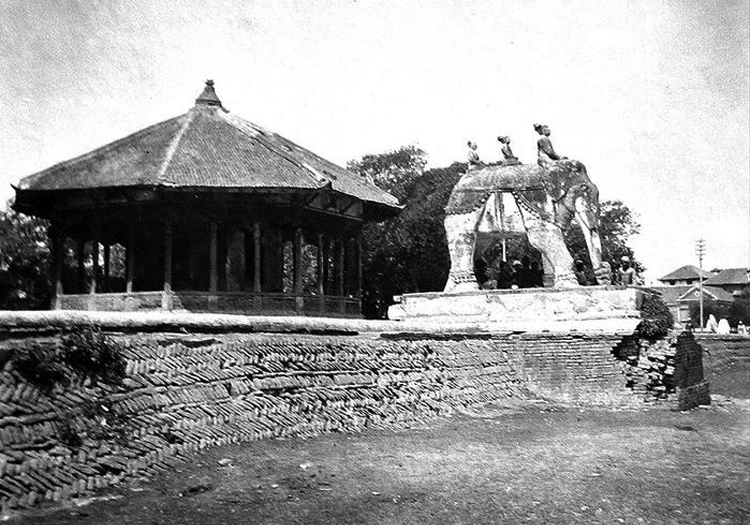
Statue of elephant and pavilion, circa 1930. The old brickwork can be seen here.

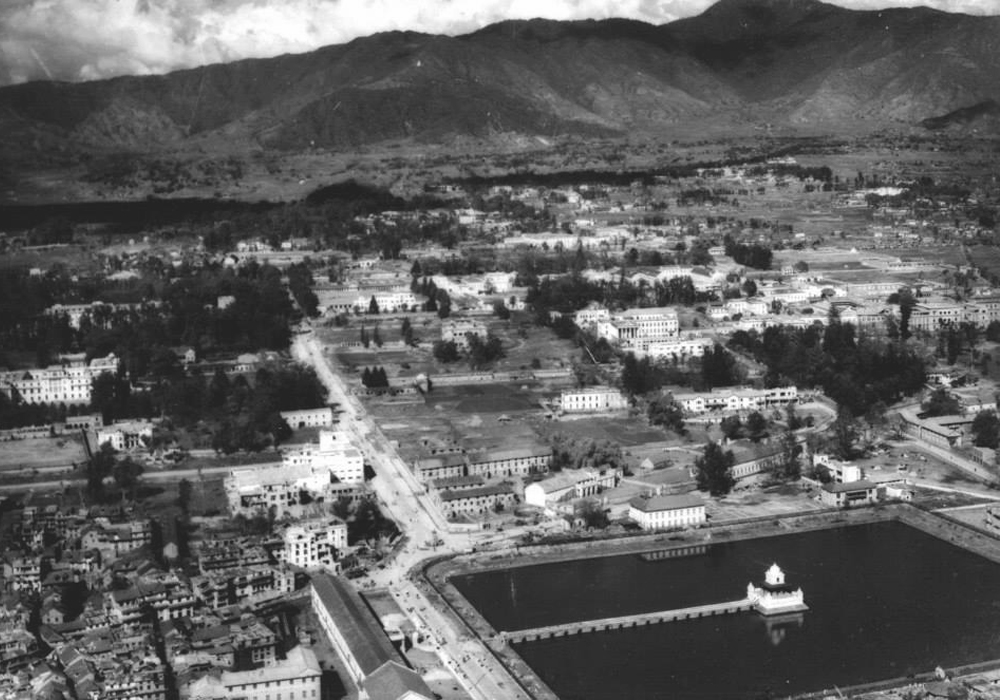
Bird's-eye view of Rani Pokhari and nearby areas in the 1950s

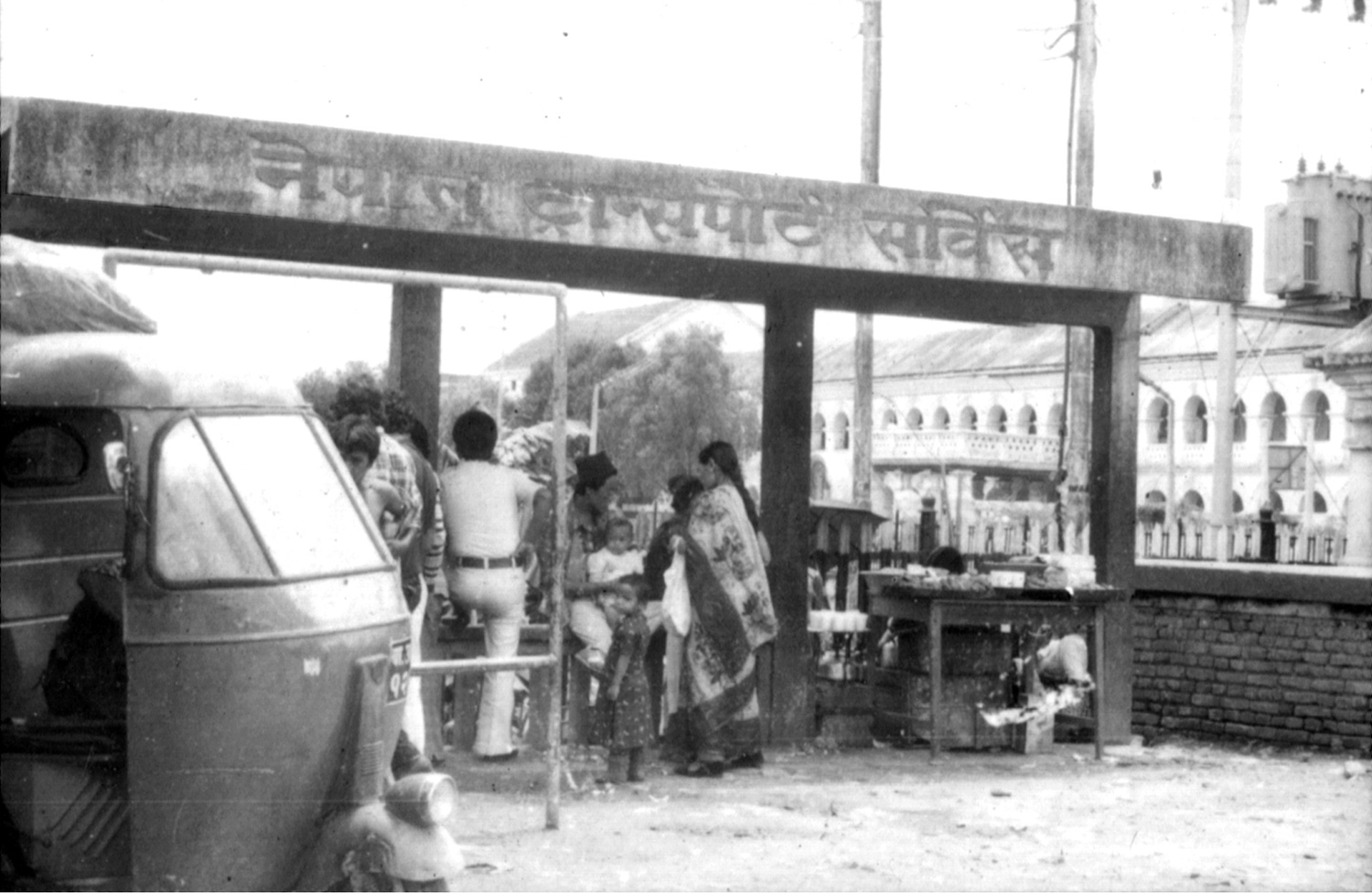
Former bus stand built in the early 1960s on the northwestern corner
