= Gehendra Shumsher =

Nepali firearm designer and army general (1871–1906)

General Gehendra Shumsher Jung Bahadur Rana (JBR)
- गेहेन्द्र शमशेर
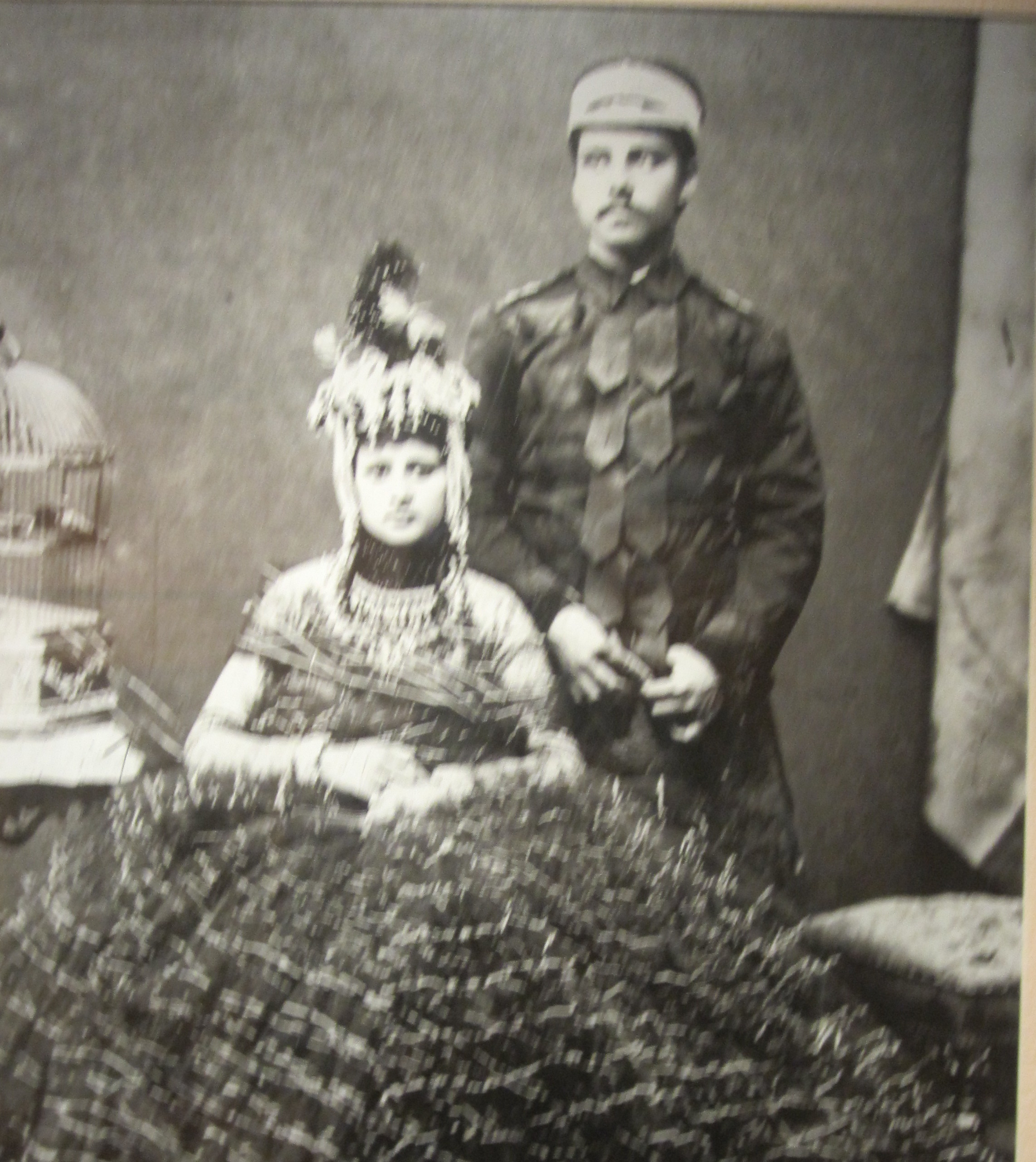
- Shumsher with his wife
- Born: 1871
- Died: 1906 (aged 34–35)
- Known for: Gahendra Martini
- Father: Bir Shumsher

Gehendra Shumsher (Nepali: गेहेन्द्र शमशेर, 1871–1906) was a Nepali innovator, firearm designer, and general in the then Nepali Army. He was the eldest son of Bir Shumsher, the third prime minister of the Rana dynasty. He is generally regarded as the first scientist of Nepal.

== Early life ==
Gehendra was born in Poush, 1928 BS (1871 CE). (Note: Since the Vikram Samvat calendar is 56.7 years ahead (in count) of Gregorian calendar, the CE year can be approximated by subtracting 56.7 from the BS year and rounding it down to the nearest integral value.) He was born in Nepal where his father was sent to serve as the Nepali representative to India.

He had the rare privilege to study. Apart from being privately tutored within the palace in English, he later also attended Durbar High School – the oldest modern school of Nepal. With the enrollment in Durbar High School, his interests were kindled, now that he was trying his hand at sports and music as well. However, past Durbar High School, not much is known about his academic part of life. While some references suggest he was sent to Japan along with 5 others to pursue engineering studies, his precise academic qualification remains unknown.

As a kid, Gehendra was intimately drawn to mechanics and ammunition. After the murder of Ranodip Singh Kunwar in 1942 BS, his father, Bir Shumsher, became the nation's prime minister, and opportunities popped up for him. At the age of 14 years, he was appointed to take care of the ammunition department in the Royal Nepal Army. This early exposure gutted in him a lifelong fascination for arms, ammunition, and the like.

== Career ==
At some point, Gehendra Shumsher worked as a spy chief and the head of police, but his interests were largely confined to the manufacture and design of firearms. As opposed to importing arms and ammunition from other countries, he wanted to manufacture them within the country, especially by exploiting locally available raw materials like iron and coal. So, after a considerable study of British catalogues, he set up manufacturing factories at Jamal (Seto Durbar), Sundarijal, Balaju, and Megchan (Bhojpur) with a view of doing just that.

Towards the end of 1956 BS, Gehendra Shumsher imported a motor car from Ford Motor Company. He tried to make a new motor car himself by disassembling and studying every part in every detail. Besides, he set up a seven boiler rice mill and wind motor to draw underground water at Seto Durbar, the residential palace he inherited from his father. He was the first man in Nepal to produce electricity in Nepal. He demonstrated how electricity could be produced with the help of water. In addition, he also set up a leather tanning factory in Balaju.

Gehendra Shamsher is credited for modernization of Nepal Army. He was able to make his own mechanical machine gun similar to Gardner gun and named it Bir gun after his father. He is also credited for modifying Martini–Henry into new gun Gahendra Martini and Ge-rifle, a double-barrelled machine gun. Besides, he also developed a new model of canon Dhir-Gun, named in honour of his grandfather, Dhir Shumsher.

== Later life ==
After the demise of Bir Shumsher, Dev Shumsher ascended to the throne. Dev and Gehendra Shumsher shared an amicable relationship, so Gehendra had an important position in the palace. He was appointed as the spy chief and head of police. Later, upon the request of Dev Shumsher, he went to Japan to study the Japanese technology, especially with regard to the manufacturing of firearms.

Gehendra Shumsher died a mysterious death at the age of 35. However, it is believed that during initial years of Chandra Shumsher's premiership, Gehendra Shumsher was murdered at his residence in Seto Durbar as Chandra Shumsher Rana was scared of his political and military influence. It is said that in his death bed while drawing his last breath he told a person attending him that one day someone named Ishchan will be born to take his place and make history. But it is a mystery when and where this person's will be born.

== See also ==
- Achyutananda (Inventor), another inventor and friend
