= Gahendra Rifle =

Military rifle used in the Nepal Army

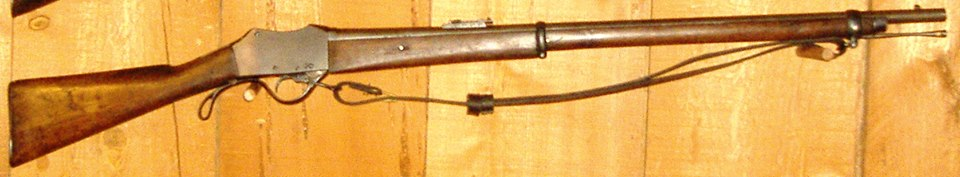
- Gahendra Rifle
- Place of origin: Nepal

Service history
- In service: 1880 — Present
- Used by: Nepal

Production history
- Manufacturer: Nepal Army
- Produced: 1880s

Specifications
- Length: 49.5 in (126 cm)
- Barrel length: 33 in (84 cm)
- Cartridge: .577/450 Martini–Henry
- Barrels: 1
- Action: Martini Falling Block
- Feed system: Single-shot

The Gahendra Rifle is a .577/450 Martini–Henry breech loading military rifle manufactured by gunsmiths of the Nepal Army under the direction of General Gehendra Shamsher JBR in the early 1880s. The design is a modified version of the 1869 Westley Richards patented design.
