= Durbar High School =

Public school in Kathmandu

- दरबार हाई स्कूल
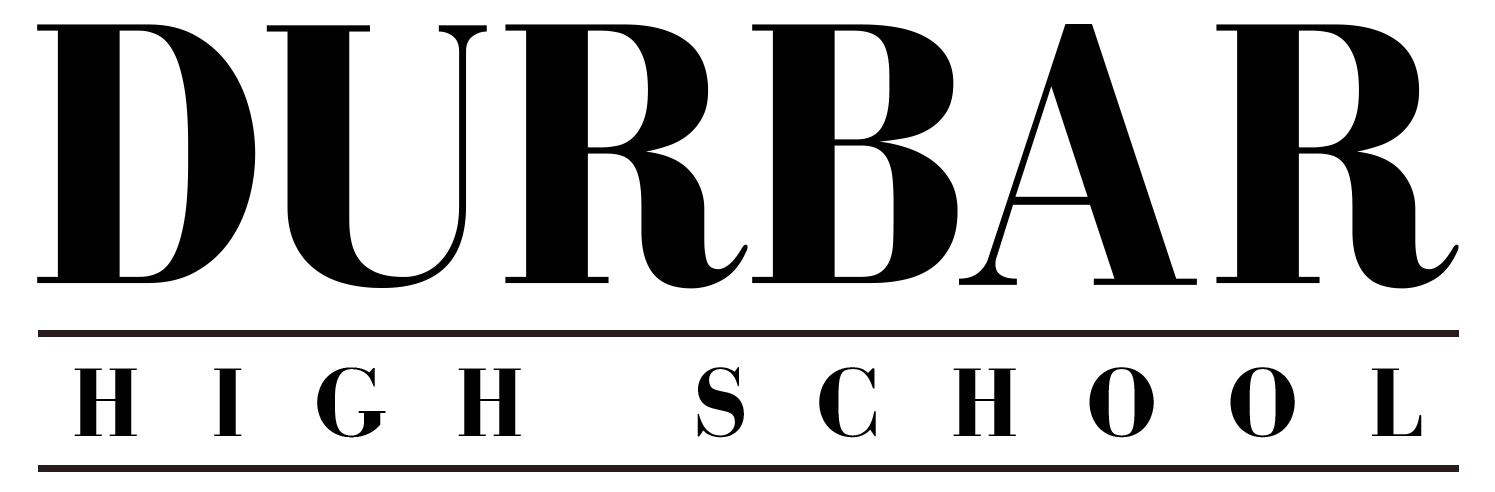

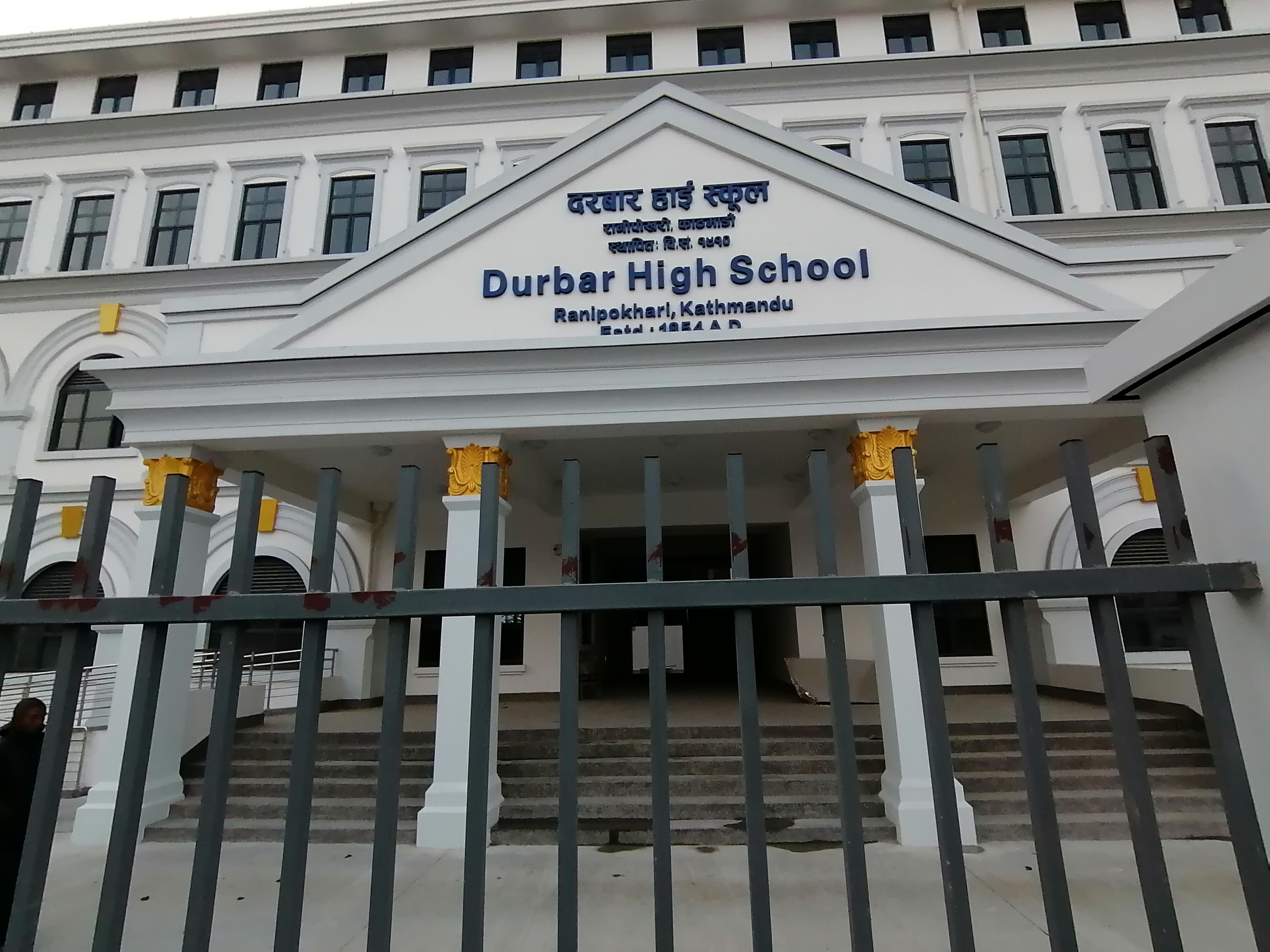
- Entrance of the school

Location
- Rani Pokhari; Kathmandu, Bagmati Province; Nepal
- Coordinates: 27.70773716135205°N 85.31407081654876°E

Information
- Other name: Bhanu Higher Secondary School (भानु माद्यमिक विद्यालय )
- Type: Public
- Established: 1854; 172 years ago
- Founder: Jung Bahadur Rana
- Principal: Sharada Kumari Paudel
- Staff: 24
- Grades: Nursery-12
- Enrolment: 350
- Language: English, Nepali
- Schedule: 10 am - 4 pm
- Website: Official website

Durbar High School (Nepali: दरबार हाई स्कूल) or Bhanu Higher Secondary School, opened in 1854 is the oldest English education school which publicly established English education system in the country. in Nepal located near Rani Pokhari, Kathmandu whereas the first school of Nepal is considered Yjnayavalkya Vidyapeeth at Matihani of Mahottari. The school was originally built to teach sons of Ranas exclusively but was opened to public citizens in 1902 by Dev Shumsher Jang Bahadur Rana. At first, Rana children were given education at Thapathali Durbar but later Jung Bahadur Rana moved it into its own building at Ranipokhari, Kathmandu.

Some parts of the school were destroyed in the April 2015 Nepal earthquake. The school was rebuilt under the Chinese Aid.

== History ==
Durbar High School also known as Bhanu Secondary School is established during Rana regime. Established in 1854, Durbar High School is the country's first school. Located in Rani Pokhari, Kathmandu, it previously taught only members of the ruling family, but was opened to private citizens in 1902.

The school had to shift constantly from Thapathali Durbar to Charburja Durbar, Seto Durbar and Narayanhiti Durbar before being located in a small shed in Jamal. Finally in 1891, the then prime minister Bir Shumsher Rana had the present long building built on the west side of Rani Pokhari In 1900, Durbar School was turned into a public school. In 1967, its name was changed to Bhanu Madhyamik Vidyalaya.

The school lies next to Rani Pokhari built by king Pratap Malla in 1670. The school was originally an elementary English school. Feeling humiliated by not being able to communicate in English during his visit to Europe, Jung Bahadur Rana set up a school at his residence in 1853 with two teachers imported from England to teach children of the ruling families. The school was later shifted to Thapathali Durbar with an Englishman called Kenning as its first teacher. Named Durbar School (palace school), it marked the beginning of modern education in Nepal, but only the ruling Ranas and their sons could attend it. In 1876, the school began admitting children of high class government officers too.

Initially, the school as a feeder institution was affiliated with Calcutta University, and students had to travel to Kolkata for their high school entrance examination until an examination centre affiliated with Patna University was opened in Kathmandu in 1929.

In 1933, the government established the School Leaving Certificate Examination Board and students did not have to travel to India for their exams.

Some parts of the school were destroyed in the April 2015 Nepal earthquake. The school was rebuilt under the Chinese Aid. The four-storey school building with more than 40 classrooms is built in an area of 4,200 square metres.

== Present day ==
The building of Durbar High School which was reconstructed with support from the Government of China was handed over to the school management on 8 September 2020.

As of 2020, around 350 Students are studying in Durbar High School. Currently, there are 17 teachers teaching in Durbar High School. Among them, 8 teachers are for secondary level. 3 for lower secondary level and 6 for primary level. At the present, there are only 7 staffs for the school administration.

The school has also started teaching Robotics and Programming classes from Grade 3 and formed a STEAM CLUB (Initiative of KMC Mayor). It plans to focus more on the extracurricular activities. The school further plans to operate classes 11 and 12.

== Gallery ==
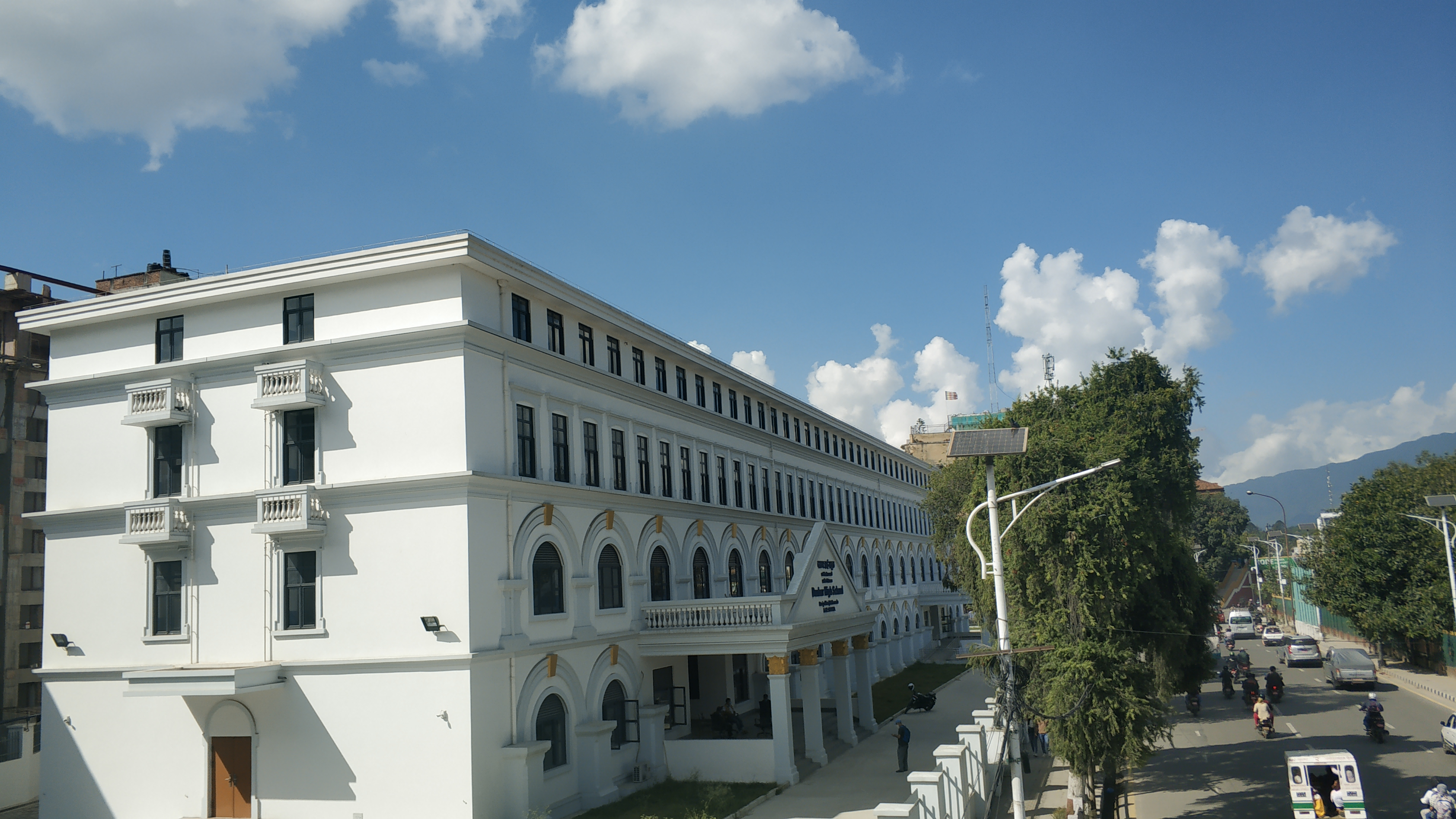
Side view of the building

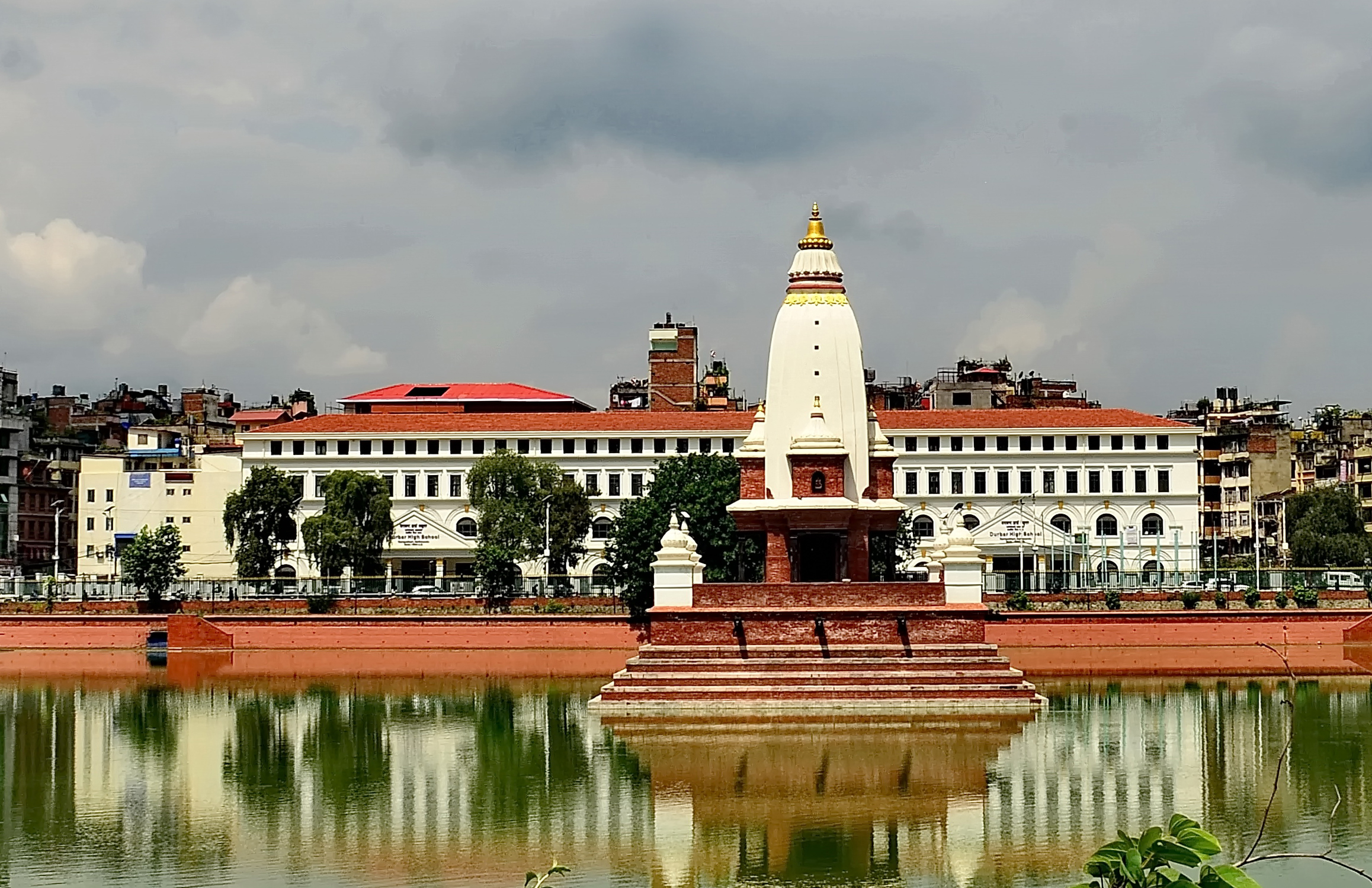
Rani Pokhari and Durbar High School (in background)

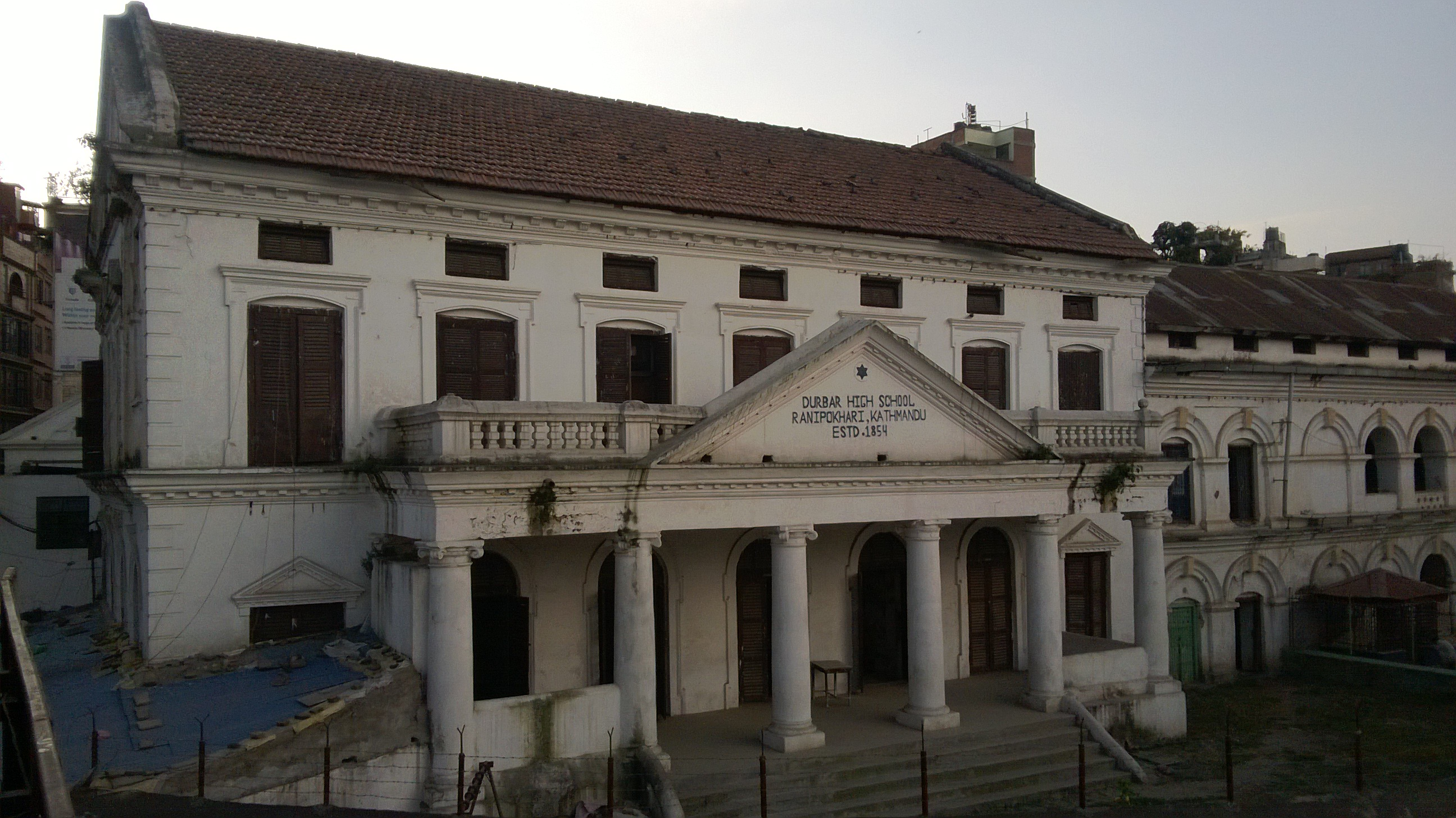
Old structure of the building before 2015 earthquake

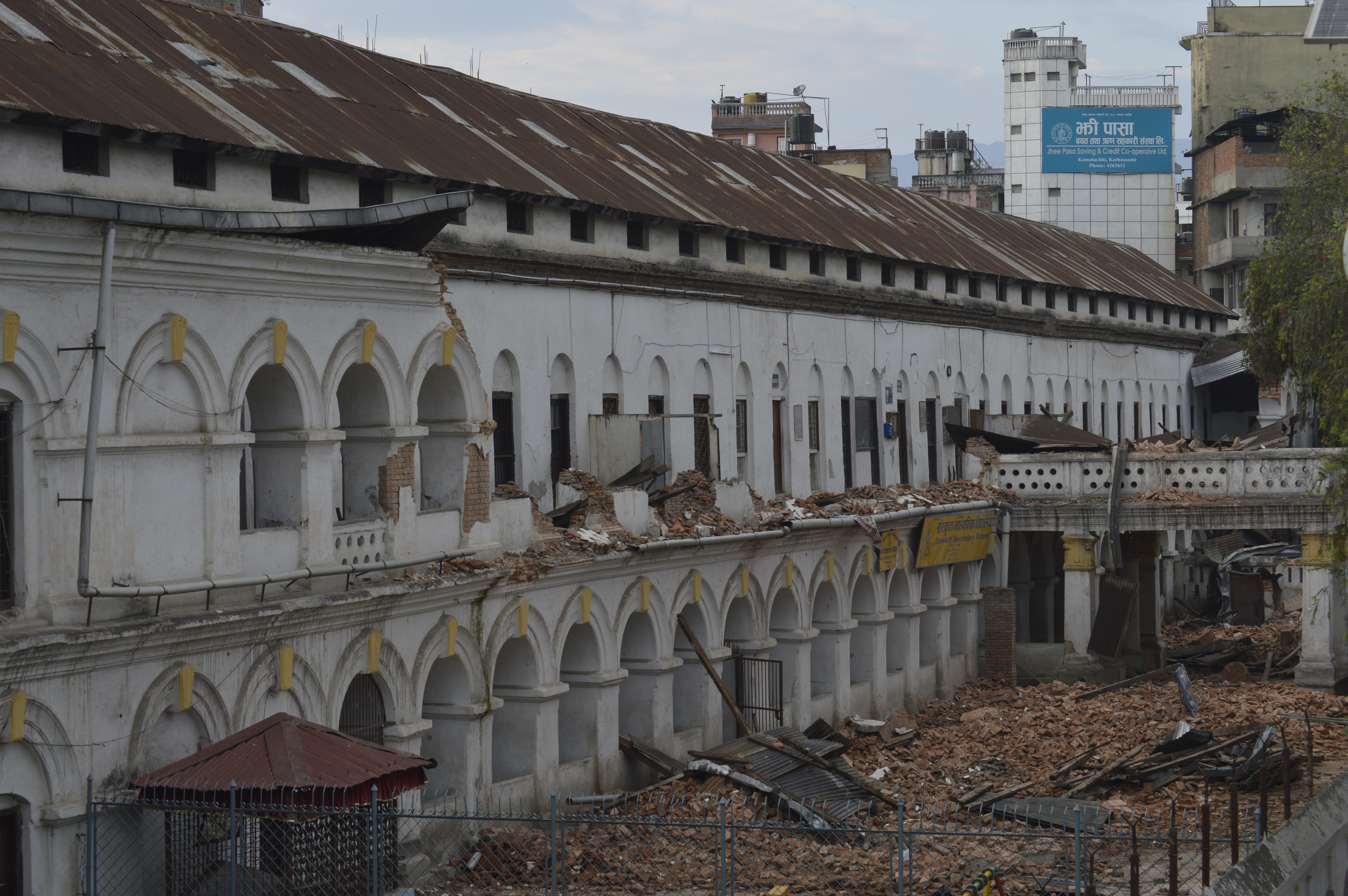
School destroyed by 2015 earthquake

== See also ==
- Yjnayawalkya Bidhyapeeth
- Education in Nepal
- Tri-Chandra College
- Padma Kanya Multiple Campus
