= Bishal Nath Upreti =

Nepali geologist

- Born: April 22, 1951 (age 74)
- Occupation: Engineering geologist

Bishal Nath Upreti (born April 22, 1951, in Nepal) is a geologist and academic at the Department of Geology, Tri-Chandra Campus, Tribhuvan University, Kirtipur, Kathmandu, Nepal.

== Career ==
Upreti has worked for over eighteen years as the head of the Central Department of Geology at Kirtipur Campus and the Department of Geology, Tri-Chandra Campus, Tribhuvan University in Nepal. His academic work specialises in Nepalese geology. His teaching of both undergraduate and post-graduate students has focussed on Engineering Geology both in Nepal and abroad.

Upreti has co-edited a book about the geology of the Nepalese Himalayas. he has also co-edited a book about landslide hazard management and control in the Hindukush-Himalaya region.

In 1999, Upreti was a visiting professor at the Hiroshima University, Japan, under the fellowship of the Japan Society of Promotion of Sciences (JSPS). In 2001, he was a visitingprofessor at the Jawaharlal Nehru Centre for Advanced Scientific Research in Bangalore, India.

Upreti is the president of the Disaster Preparedness Network-Nepal (DPNet) He is a long serving member of the Nepal Geological Society.

Currently, Upreti is the president of NRNA-Zambia and also is a professor in the Department of Geology at the University of Zambia in Lusaka and a TWAS Research Professor (2012-2017) in the same university.

== Awards ==
- Suprabal Gorkha Dakshin Bahu, conferred by King Birendra Bir Bikram Shah Dev, 1996.
- Mahendra Vidhya Bhusan Class 'A', conferred by King Birendra Bir Bikram Shah Dev, 1980.
- Mahendra Vidhya Bhusan Class 'B', conferred by King Birendra Bir Bikram Shah Dev, 1973.
- Natural Disaster Relief Medal, conferred by the Government of Nepal.
- C.N.R. Rao Prize for scientific research, 2015. Upreti received the award "for his outstanding contributions to the investigation of the stratigraphy and tectonics of the Nepal Himalayas and our understanding of the geology of Nepal".

== See also ==
- Geology of Nepal

== Research publications ==
Upreti, B.N., Dhital, M.R., 1996. Landslide studies and management in Nepal. International Centre for Integrated Mountain Development (ICIMOD), Kathmandu, 87p.
