= Achyutananda (inventor) =

Nepali inventor

Achyutananda (Nepali: अच्युतानन्द, romanized: Achutananda; born 1851) was a Nepali inventor. He was born in the Gorkha kingdom. His family name is Pokhrel. It is believed that he made some kind of flying device that could fly for a distance of about 200 m in the test flight. The claim however is disputed. He was banned from conducting his works by the Rana regime and sent to Benaras.

He also created a steam-powered bamboo cart based on his experience of trains in India during the British Raj. It took him 20 years to do it.
