= Shankar Prasad Shrestha =

Nepalese Professor

Shankar Prasad Shrestha (Nepali: शङ्कर प्रसाद श्रेष्ठ; born July 13, 1959) is a Nepalese Professor of Physics at department of Physics, Patan Multiple Campus, Lalitpur, Nepal. He did his Master of Science in 1984 from Tribhuvan University, PhD in 1999 from School of Material Science and Technology, Varanasi, India and postdoc from Sungkyunkwan University, South Korea in July 2001. He is a member of Nepal Physical Society and American Physical Society. He is known as Physics educator and researcher of Material Science; particularly in the field of thin film and Carbon nanotube, here in Tribhuvan University, Kathmandu, Nepal.
