= Binil Aryal =

Nepalese scientist

Binil Aryal is a Nepali physicist working as a professor at the Central Department of Physics, Tribhuvan University . Dr. Aryal is an Academician at Nepal Academy of Science & Technology (NAST). He served as the Dean of Tribhuvan University (TU)'s Institute of Science and Technology during 2020 to 2024. Previously, he served as the head of the Central Department of Physics, located in Kirtipur, Kathmandu. He has supervised dozens of PhD students and hundreds of Masters' students for their theses and dissertations at Tribhuvan University. His research primarily focuses on astrophysics. He has co-authored more than 125 publications .

Aryal did his PhD and post-doctoral work at the Institute of Astrophysics, Innsbruck University in 2002 and 2005 respectively, under the supervision of Walter Saurer.
