= Dayananda Bajracharya =

- दयानन्द बज्राचार्य
- Born: 22 September 1945; Kathmandu, Nepal
- Died: 11 November 2013 (aged 68); Kathmandu, Nepal
- Citizenship: Nepali
- Education: Botany (Ph.D.)
- Alma mater: University of Freiburg (PhD); Gorakhpur University (MSc); Tri-Chandra College (BSc)
- Spouse: Kokila Bajracharya
- Children: Sardu Bajracharya; Sahaj Bajracharya
- Scientific career
- Fields: Plant science; Science communication
- Institutions: Tribhuvan University; Nepal Academy of Science and Technology
- Website: dayanandabajracharya.com

Dayananda Bajracharya (Nepali: दयानन्द बज्राचार्य) was a Nepalese professor, biologist, and science writer. He got his master's degree from India and Ph.D. from Freiburg University, Germany. He was the vice chancellor of Nepal Academy of Science and Technology from 1998 to 2006.

His Ph.D. thesis and research on plant physiology and cytology are amongst the principles on which modern cell biology is based. In honor of Dr. Bajracharya, Nepal Academy of Science and Technology (NAST) has established Prof. Dr. Dayananda Bajracharya Research Award.

== Awards and honors ==
- 1967: Mahendra Vidyabhusan Gold Medal, Class II
- 1976: Mahendra Vidyabhusan Gold Medal, Class I
- 1999: Prasiddha Prabal Gorkha Dakshin Bahu

== Books and Publications ==
- Experiments in Plant Physiology (1978) - published by Narosa Publishers, India
- Chetanako Yatra
- Baigyanik Goretoma
- Adhayro Ma Ek Kaati Salaai
