= Lujendra Ojha =

Nepalese-American planetary scientist (born 1991)

- लुजेन्द्र ओझा
- Born: 1990 (age 35–36); Nepal
- Other names: Luju
- Education: Ph.D. (2016); B.Sc., University of Arizona, 2012
- Alma mater: Georgia Institute of Technology
- Scientific career
- Fields: Planetary science with volcanology minor
- Institutions: NASA
- Website: www.lujendraojha.com

Lujendra Ojha (b. 1990, लुजेन्द्र ओझा) is an American planetary scientist. He, as an undergraduate under the direction of planetary geologist Alfred McEwen, discovered compelling evidence that water on Mars includes current, seasonal, surface liquid brine flows. He is currently an assistant professor of planetary science at Rutgers University. He has also played in a heavy metal band, Gorkha.

== Awards ==
- Special Recognition — Office of the Governor. Douglas A. Ducey (Governor, AZ)
- National Science Foundation (2015) — Research Excellence Award
- Lunar and Planetary Institute (2013) — Team-X Merit Award
- University of Arizona (2012) — First Place in Physical Science Research. Annual Student Showcase.
- University of Arizona (2011) — Honorary Presidents Award
- Group Achievement Award: HiRISE Science Team, NASA (2011)
