= Yadav Pandit =

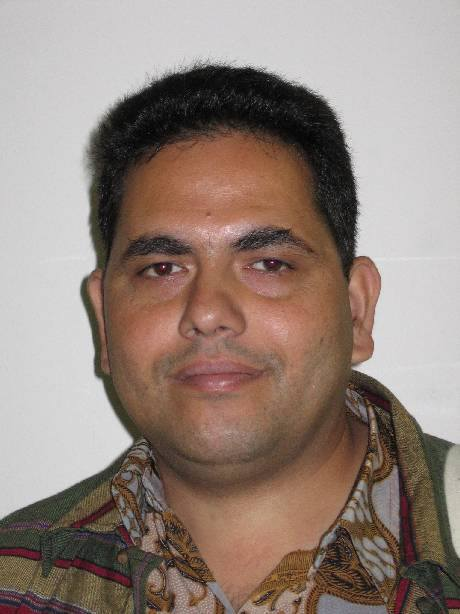
- Pandit in 2005
- Born: Pyuthan, Nepal
- Scientific career
- Fields: Nuclear Physics, Heavy Ion Physics

Dr. Yadav Pandit is a research scholar, working in the field of Experimental Nuclear Physics.

== Early life and education ==
Yadav Pandit was born in Tikuri, Pyuthan District, located in the western hills of Nepal. He is the youngest child of Bhuwaneshwar Pandit and Radhika Pandit. He was educated first at Shishu Kalyan Primary School in Tikuri and then at Janata High School Bagdula, from where he graduated S.L.C. He studied science at Tribhuvan University, from where he obtained a M.Sc., and later went to the United States for further education, earning a Ph.D. degree in Experimental Nuclear Physics from Kent State University.

== Research ==
Pandit's research involves the experimental high-energy nuclear physics, also often called high-energy "heavy-ion" physics. He is a member of STAR collaboration, a large international group of scientists working at the Relativistic Heavy Ion Collider (RHIC) facility, Brookhaven National Laboratory.

Pandit is an expert in measurements of anisotropy, studying fluid-like behavior and phase transitions in the dense and highly excited matter created in these collisions. In 2014, his work related to the observation of first-order phase transition in subatomic nuclear matter gained worldwide attention and was widely reported. He is one of the very few Nepali scholars who had successes making significant contribution in fundamental science research. Pandit's scientific area of interest is in phase transition phenomena in the dense and highly excited nuclear matter created in heavy ion collisions.

== Professional Work/membership ==
- 2020: Assistant Professor of Physics at Baptist Health Science University
- 2019: Assistant Professor of Physics at Missouri Western State University.
- 2016: Faculty of Physical Sciences, ACCC.
- 2014-2017: Advisor, Non Resident Nepali National Coordination Council of USA.
- 2012-2016: Postdoctoral Research Associate, University of Illinois at Chicago.
- 1996: Life Member, Nepal Physical Society
- 2008–present: Member, American Physical Society

== Publications ==
Pandit has published more than 90 research articles as an author or coauthor.
