= Tej Kumar Shrestha =

- Born: February 11, 1948 (age 78); Baglung, Nepal
- Education: Tribhuvan University, Bhopal University (Barkatullah University)
- Known for: Ganges river dolphin, mahseer, spiny babbler, Himalayan newt, birds of Nepal
- Awards: Received Third World Academy of Sciences (TWAS) Award on "Biological Sciences" from Trieste, Italy (1988)
- Scientific career
- Fields: Zoology
- Workplaces: Central Department of Zoology. Tribhuvan University
- Doctoral advisor: PhD - Professor S.S. Khanna, DSc - Professor B.S. Chauhan and Professor D.K. Belsare

Tej Kumar Shrestha (born February 11, 1948) is a Nepalese naturalist and zoologist. Shrestha is founder secretary of the Zoological Society of Nepal. He is also a founder member of the Bird Watching Club of Nepal and has been closely associated with the wildlife conservation movement of the country for over last three decades.

He has written many books, including Wildlife of Nepal (1981) and his bestselling book Ichthyology of Nepal (2008) about fishes of Nepal.

== Biography ==
Shrestha was born in Baglung, Dhaulagiri, on February 11, 1948, to the son of a businessman, named Pashupati Shrestha, and Chandra Kumari Shrestha. Shrestha was fascinated with fishes and bird watching, a hobby he shared with his father and grandfather Bhakti Lal Shrestha.

He studied initially at the Tribhuvan University in Nepal. He was awarded a Ph.D. in 1976 and subsequently worked at the Barkatullah University (Bhopal University) in India for DSc degree, which was awarded in 1994. Shrestha has extensively travelled around Himalayan passes, mountains, rivers, and forests of Nepal.

He has contributed scientific papers and articles on wildlife ecology and behaviour in national and international journals. His popular articles have appeared on radio and TV in Nepal and abroad. He is the author of sixteen books on wildlife and natural resources including Wildlife of Nepal. He serves IUCN Species Survival Commission (SSC) as a member in different specialist groups.

== Awards and decorations ==
- Third World Academy of Sciences (TWAS) Award from Trieste, Italy, 1988 .
- Sir Dorab Tata Gold Medal, from Zoological Society of India (1998)
- Dr. B.S. Chauhan Gold Medal, from Zoological Society of India (2005)

== Career ==
At Tribhuvan University, starting in 1970, Shrestha achieved a series of academic promotions from Lecturer, to Associate Professor to full Professor of Zoology. Shrestha served Nepal Academy of Science and Technology 1987-1990.

== Honorary affiliations ==
- Barkatullah University, India
- University of Tripura, India

== Published books ==
- Ichthyology of Nepal, 2008
- Wildlife of Nepal, 1981 (First Edition), 2003 (Second Edition)
- Herpetology of Nepal, 2001
- Birds of Nepal. Volume 2, 2001
- Birds of Nepal. Volume 1, 2000
- Spiny Babbler: An Endemic Bird of Nepal, 1998
- Mammals of Nepal, 1997
- The Mahseer in the Rivers of Nepal Disrupted by Dams and Ranching Strategies, 1997
- The Ganges River Dolphin, 1995
- Fish Catching in the Himalayan Waters of Nepal, 1995
- Encounter with the Himalayan Wildlife, 1994
- Ecology of the Mahseer in the Himalayan Waters of Nepal, 1994
- Introduction to Fish Culture English 1993 (in Nepali language, 1990)
- Dolphins and Whales (Nepali language), 1990
- Resource Ecology of Himalayan Waters, 1990
- The Environment of Suklaphanta, 1977
