= Nepal Academy of Science and Technology =

Autonomous body

- नेपाल विज्ञान तथा प्रविधि प्रज्ञा-प्रतिष्ठान
- Formation: 1982; 44 years ago
- Headquarters: Khumaltar, Lalitpur
- Official language: Nepali and English
- Owner: Government of Nepal
- Chairman: Prof. Dr. Dilip Subba
- Parent organization: Ministry of Science, Technology and Innovation
- Affiliations: International Science Council
- Website: www.nast.gov.np

Nepal Academy of Science and Technology (NAST), previously RONAST, is an autonomous apex body established in 1982 to promote science and technology in Nepal. With the implementation of federal structure by the government of Nepal, it has opened its first provincial office at Mahendranagar.

== Objectives ==
It has the following objectives:

- Advancement of science and technology
- Preservation and modernization of indigenous technologies.
- Promotion of research in science and technology.
- Identification and facilitation of technology.

== Molecular Biotechnology Unit Laboratory ==
The Molecular Biotechnology Unit (previously called the Biotechnology Unit) started research at DNA level in 2002 with molecular diagnosis of Citrus Huanglongbing (HLB) disease; commonly known as Citrus Greening Disease. Prior to this, it was engaged in research activities such as the production of disease-free planting materials of citrus through shoot tip grafting in vitro tissue culture technique, Bacillus thuringiensis based biological pesticide, Citrus Tristeza Virus diagnosis using ELISA technique and plant propagation using plant growth regulators.

Activities of the unit are:

- PCR-based diagnosis of Citrus Huanglongbing disease in Nepal,
- Molecular characterization and DNA barcoding of medicinal and aromatic plants of Nepal, using PCR-based and DNA sequencing based molecular markers,
- Exploration, molecular and biotechnological characterization of medicinal plants and fungal biodiversity of Manasalu Conservation Area, Central Nepal and Sagarmatha National Park, Khumbu region,
- Exploration of hot spring Thermophile for the production of industrially important enzymes,
- Exploration, molecular and biotechnological characterization of probiotic microorganisms of the dairy products of Nepal,
- Himalayan seed bank for utilization of medicinal and aromatic plants and wild plant biodiversity of Nepal,
- Management of alien invasive species - Parthenium weed (Parthenium hysterophorus L.) and Mikania weed (Mikania micrantha Kunth ex. H.B. K) in Nepal

== Environment Research Laboratory ==
The Environment and climate study research unit conducts research on environmental issues. Besides research, water quality analysis service is provided to consumers. The major programs of the unit are:

- Water and wastewater treatment,
- Waste management,
- Climatological study,
- Satellite rainfall estimation,
- Water quality analysis services.

The objective is to investigate methods of pollution control, conduct climatological and meteorological studies and provide an analytical service for the quality analysis of water.

Program and achievements;

- The Water and Wastewater Treatment program develops methods for the removal of chemical contaminants from water and waste waters. It targets removal of toxic metals (heavy metals), non-metals, and metalloids using locally available low-cost materials. The achievements of the program are research articles published in national and international journals and reports. Separation of solid material from wastewater by sedimentation and filtration technique and followed by Oxidation process is one of the technique.
- The Waste Management program aims to mitigate the impact of wastes on environment and public health. The program is focused on environment and public health impact assessment of landfill sites in Nepal. A report on the “Impact Area Assessment of Okharpauwa Landfill Site” has been submitted to the Solid Waste Management Technical Support Centre.
- The Hydrospheric and Atmospheric Research program studies hydrospheric and atmospheric processes, changes and impacts over the Himalayan region. The program includes monitoring of air pollution and its impacts on climate and land cover changes, validation of satellite data for possible application on the relevant fields, and glacier monitoring.
- The Water Quality Analysis Service provides a water quality analysis service. It receives water samples from ground water, surface water, tap water and stone spouts. The water samples are received from the public, institutions, entrepreneur, NGOs and INGOs.

== Physical Science Laboratory ==
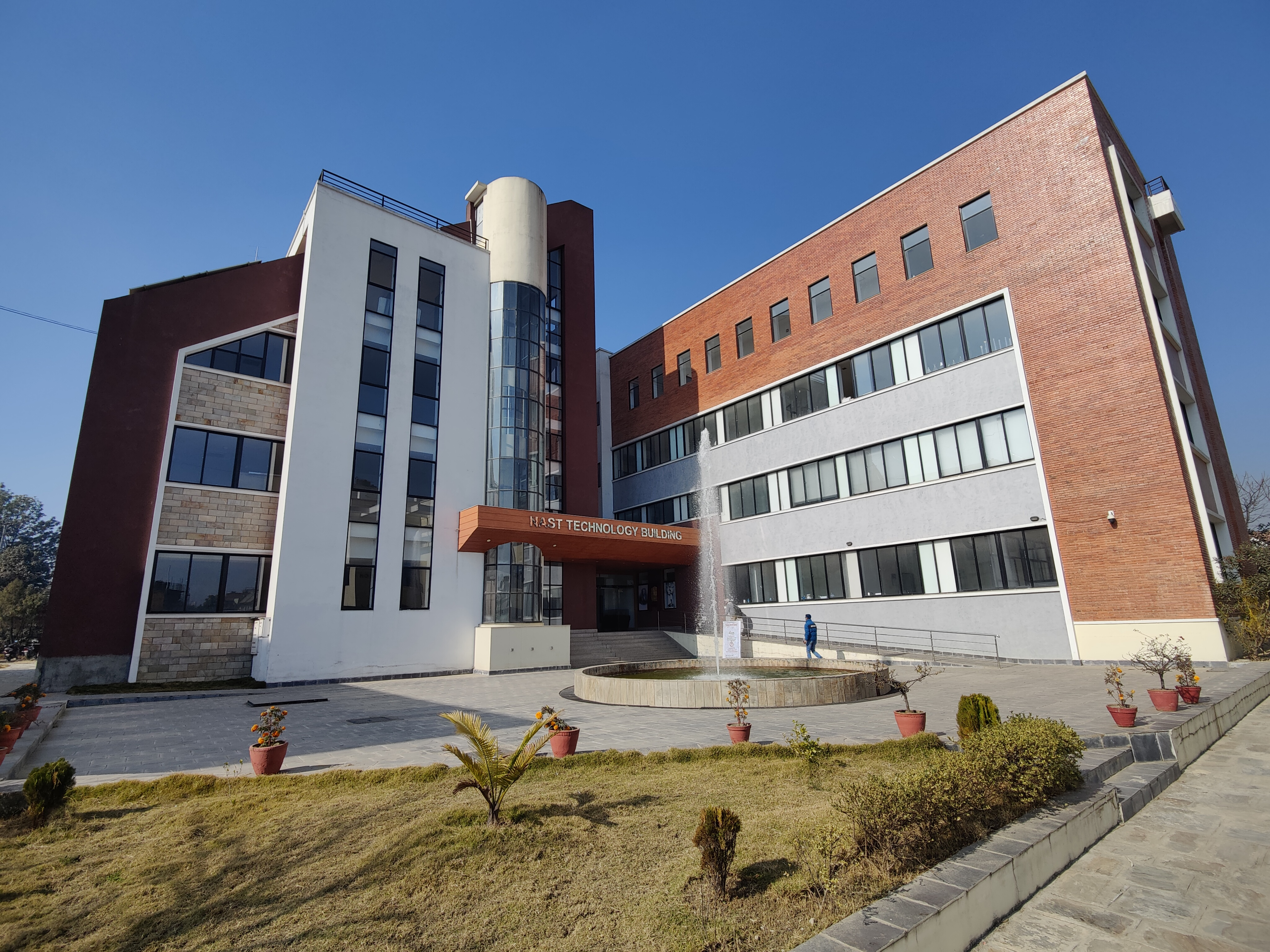
NAST's Technology Building located in Khumaltar, Lalitpur

The Physical Science Unit consists of the following fields of research:

- Environmental Radioactivity: A network of radioactivity monitors has been established to measure terrestrial radioactivity in environmental samples and in the air. The assessment of radioactivity due to Uranium and Thorium series, Potassium-40 along with total radioactivity will provide baseline information on the radiation environment.
- Personnel Dosimetry: Thermoluminescent Dosimeters monitor radiation doses absorbed by personnel (such as technicians, radiographers, radio-therapists, and medical physicists). They wear the dosimeter and the radiation exposure is estimated on the basis of TL dosimetric reading on the TLD Badge Reader.
- Household Radon Survey: Radon and its radioactive daughters present in the environment results are a contribution to the natural radiation dose received by human beings. The study of radon and its progeny exposure in dwellings is important as it can result in an inhalation risk to the population. A Solid State Nuclear Track Detector technique has been employed to study radon exposure in the dwellings of Kathmandu Valley.
- Radiation from Cell Phone Towers: People have been debating about health risk due to radiation from cell phone and cell tower. Assessment of power density due to RF (radio-frequency) exposure from the cell phone towers in the Kathmandu valley is in process.
- Development of Thin films and Nano-particles: The research is an investigation of advanced oxide materials – both thin film and nanostructures – in pursuit of three major research areas:
  - Optical and electrical properties of materials,
  - Functional materials and devices,
  - Metal oxides for solar energy conversion. The foundation of the research is the growth of metal oxide thin films and nanostructures via a wet chemical route.
- Optical and Electrical Properties of Materials: The research aims to understand solid state materials science – the physics and control of doping effects in materials.
- Functional Materials and Devices: Driven by advances in the production of high quality thin films of metal oxide materials and nanoparticles, attention has been given to recognize their applications in photo-catalyst, gas sensors, self-cleaning material etc.
- Metal Oxides for Solar Energy Applications: The academy studies the creation of oxide-based photovoltaic devices, including the understanding of semiconducting properties (i.e. band gap, carrier mobility and absorption) in these materials.

== Nepal flora project ==
Nepal has 6500 species of flowering plants. The botanical exploration is not yet completed and therefore, some plant species are unexplored. Realizing the need for a publication of the flora of Nepal, the Nepal Academy of Science and Technology initiated the project in collaboration with national and international institutions.

Ten volumes of the Nepal Flora have been scheduled to publish by 2020 in digital and printed book version. Volume 3 including plants from Magnoliaceae to Rosaceae was published in 2011 as a first publication from the Royal Botanic Garden Edinburgh, UK which includes 21 families with 123 genera, 600 species, 19 sub-species, 31 varieties and 4 forma.

== Solar Energy ==
Some activities are:

- Solar Radiation Monitoring and Analysis of the solar radiation in Nepal. The data will be processed to calculate the potential to exploit solar radiation to meet the energy demand of the country.
- Energy Auditing and Conservation in order to minimize the energy waste. Energy Auditing is the tool used for the purpose.
- Diversification of Solar Technology. The activity covers activities such as proliferation of knowledge on solar energy technologies, feasibility study of grid connected rooftop PV system along with mini/micro grids and efficient use of Sun Simulator and module tester.

== Material science and nanotechnology ==
Major activities:

- Synthesis and Extraction of Materials. The activity is dedicated to synthesizing metal oxide semiconductor nanomaterials, forming nanostructures on metal oxides and extracting organic dyes from the plants of Nepal for applications including Optoelectronic devices like solar cells. The activities will be extended in the domain of metal nanoparticles as well as polymer materials.
- Characterization of Synthesized and Extracted Materials. The materials synthesized or extracted in the laboratories of NAST are characterized under this activity. The activity covers a service provided to the researchers of other institutions of the country for the characterization of their crystalline solid samples by X-ray diffraction. To accomplish the task a Bruker D2 Phaser Diffractometer is available.
- Application of the Synthesized and Extracted Materials in Devices. All the materials synthesized or extracted in the laboratory will be used for the fabrication of devices. Emphasis will be given to apply them in Dye Sensitized Solar Cells. With the diversification in the type of materials synthesized and identification of their properties, new areas of application will be sought.

== Bio Energy Unit ==
NAST is focusing on processing technology for biodiesel production from jatropha oil and waste cooking oil using homely grown or to be grown or available feedstock or catalyst to develop the novel technology. The primary concerns are in jatropha oil, waste cooking oil, microalgae.

Biomass Laboratory: NAST works on utilization of biomass wastes; agro, forest or households, or municipal, to make energy commodities or manures as following:

- Bio briquette technology for energy
- Biochar Technology for soil enrichment
- Clean cooking solution

== Wind Energy ==
NAST is measuring wind speed and resource characterization for sites in Nepal.

== Small hydro power ==
The Small Hydro Power program was initiated from the fiscal year 2071/72 at NAST under the Faculty of Technology. Phase I (within 1st year):

- Site survey and problem identification of concern plant. Study of existing problems of small hydro in Nepal,
- Construction of small workshop for testing hydro mechanical based equipment,
- Addition of basic test and measurement instruments to the hydro-lab facility at NAST,
- Demand-based research in Small Hydro Power sector,
- Continual capacity building of the hydropower equipment standardization at NAST.

Phase II (within 2nd year):

- Establishment of testing facilities for small hydro power plants,
- Performance evaluation and analysis unit for technological difficulties and verification mechanism.

Phase III (within 3rd year):

- Lab for different hydro power components testing and technology transfer within Nepal,
- Lab based research on components and machines related to small hydro power,
- Expansion of research work on hydro power.
- Continual research and innovation in modernization of hydro lab.

=== Other hydro activities ===
- The Faculty of Technology has signed an MoU with the Ministry of Energy for the establishment of a laboratory for testing hydro equipment and machines in fiscal year 2071/072.
- Vice Chancellor of NAST, Prof. Dr. Jib Raj Pokhrel inaugurated the laboratory for hydro power on 23rd Poush 2071. The laboratory will provide testing and research facilities for small hydro power plants.

=== Other hydro research ===
- Identification of major problems in small hydro power plants,
- Solutions for any identified problems.
- Initiate test facilities for equipment and machines from this fiscal year.
