= Tri-Chandra Multiple Campus =

Campus of Tribhuvan University in Nepal

Tri-Chandra Multipurpose Campus
- त्रि-चन्द्र बहुमुखी क्याम्पस
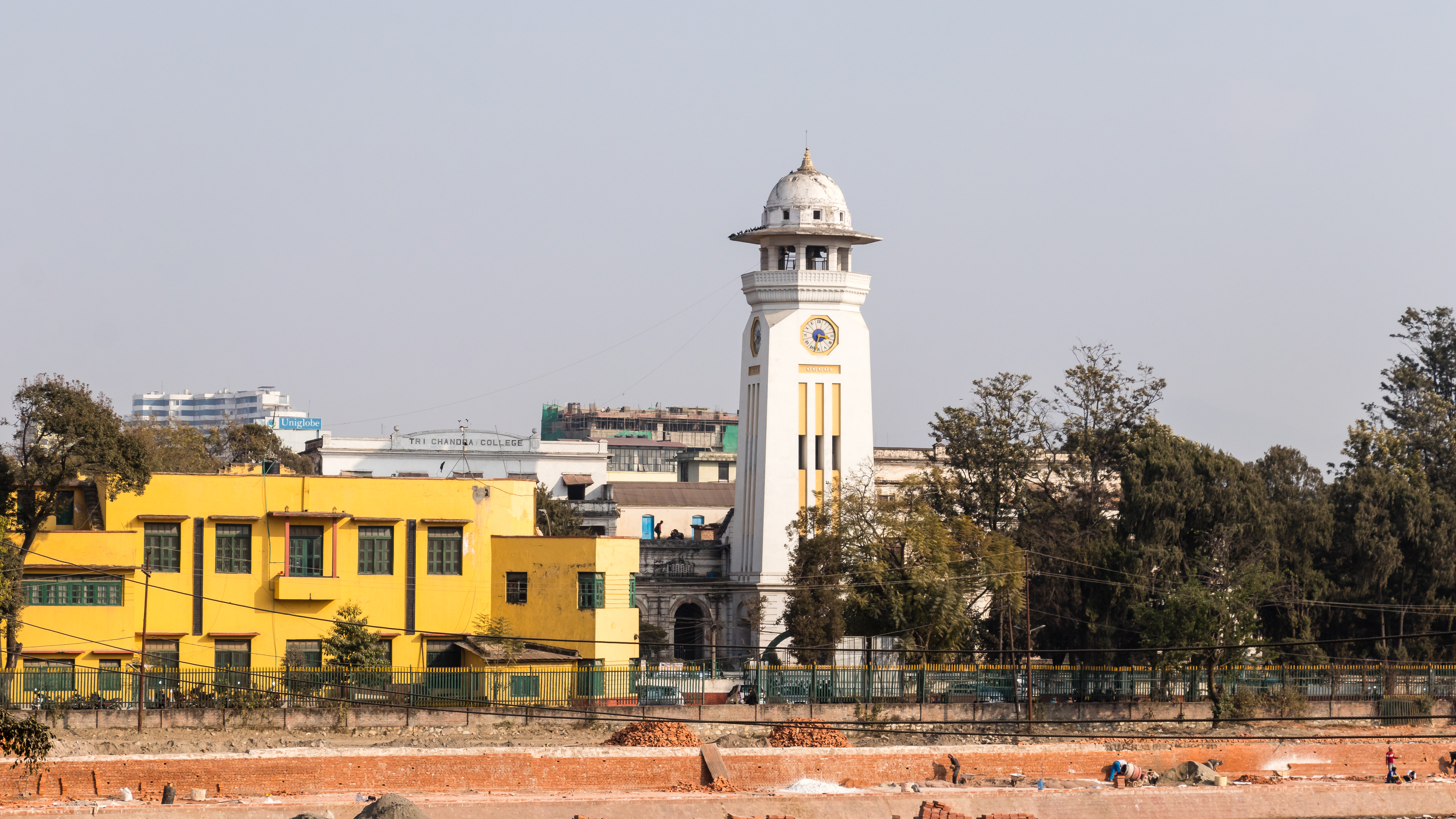
- Former names: Tribhuvan Chandra Intermediate Campus
- Type: Public
- Established: 1918; 108 years ago
- Parent institution: Tribhuvan University
- Principal: Prof. Dr. Nilam Shrestha Pradhan
- Location: Ghantaghar, Kathmandu, Bagmati, Nepal
- Language: Nepali, English
- Website: trc.tu.edu.np

Tri-Chandra Multiple Campus (Nepali: त्रि-चन्द्र बहुमुखी क्याम्पस) is a constituent campus of Tribhuvan University located in Ghantaghar, Kathmandu. Founded in 1918 by Chandra Shumsher, it is the oldest institute of higher learning in Nepal.

== Etymology ==
The current name Tri-Chandra is a truncated combination of two words: Tribhuvan for Mahārājādhirāja Tribhuwan Bir Bikram Shah and Chandra for Rana Prime Minister Chandra Shumsher. The college was originally named Tribhuvan Chandra Intermediate Campus but later renamed and shortened to its current name.

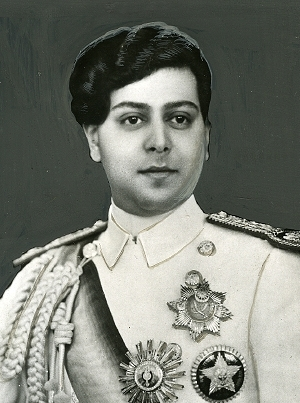
King Tribhuvan of Nepal

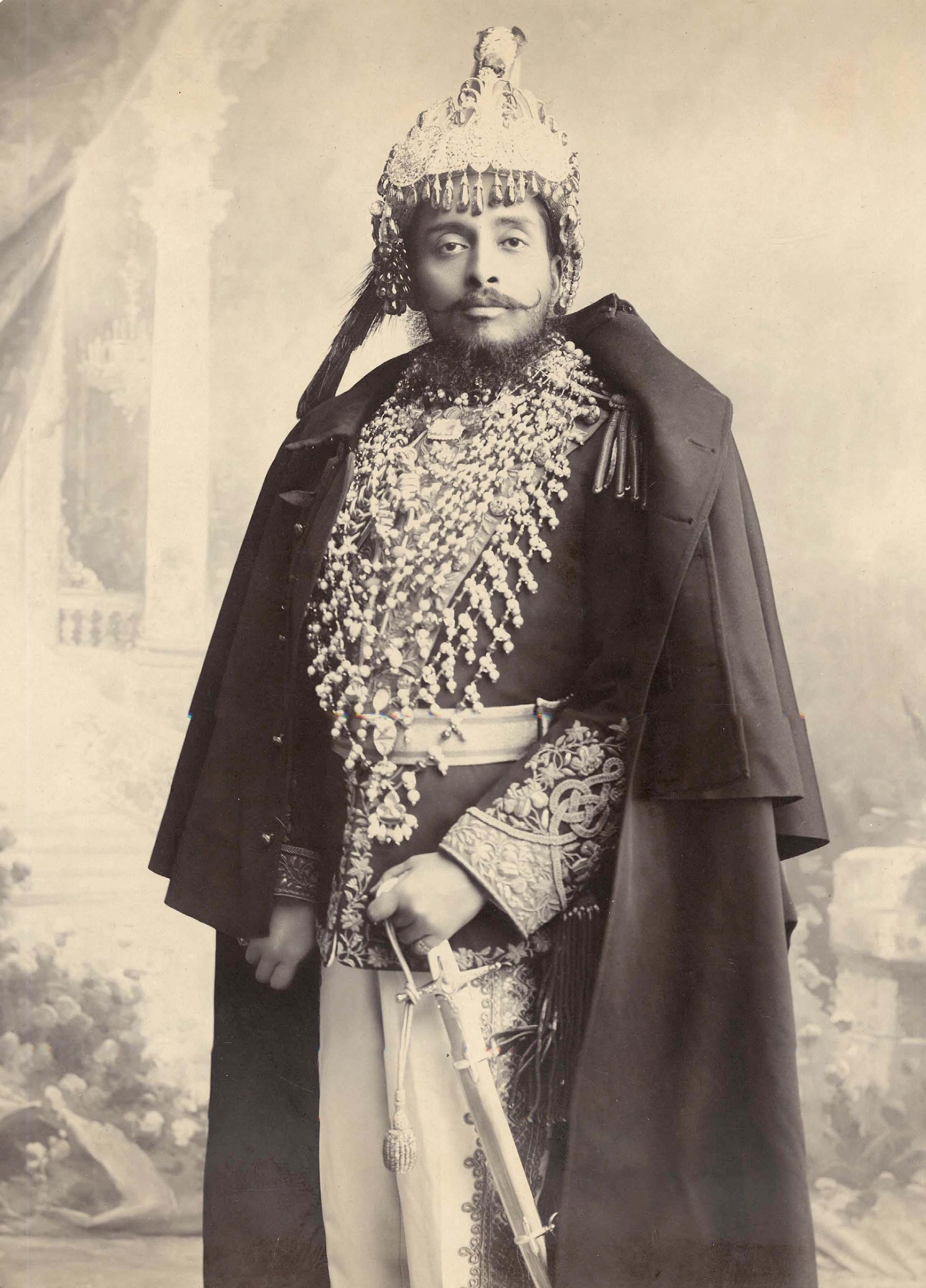
Chandra Shumsher Prime Minister of Nepal (1901–1929), founder of the college

== History ==
Nepal's first institution of higher education, Tri-Chandra College, was established in 1918 by Chandra Shumsher Jang Bahadur Rana. The college introduced science at the Intermediate level a year later, marking the genesis of formal science education in the country. In 1924, it became a full four year institution with an enrollment of just 30. However, up until the advent of democracy in 1951, the college was not accessible to the general public, but only to a handful of "noble" members of Rana regime. The main purpose of imparting science at that time was to prepare the students for further studies in technical subjects, such as medicine, engineering, agriculture, forestry, etc., in India. The science teaching at Tri-Chandra was upgraded to the Bachelor level (BSc) in 1945. Tri-Chandra was originally affiliated to the University of Calcutta, then to Patna University before finally being constituted into Tribhuvan University since 1959.

== Notable alumni ==
- Dayananda Bajracharya
- Gagan Thapa
- Girija Prasad Koirala
- Kanak Mani Dixit
- Kul Gautam
- Laxmi Prasad Devkota
- Nabindra Raj Joshi
- Narayan Gopal
- Ram Raj Pant
- Rishikesh Shaha

== See also ==
- List of universities and colleges in Nepal
