= Sadak Ra Pratibha =

1964 Nepali novel by Parijat

- Author: Parijat
- Original title: सडक र प्रतिभा
- Language: Nepali
- Genre: Short Story
- Publisher: Sajha Prakashan
- Publication place: Nepal
- Media type: Print (Paperback)

Sadak Ra Pratibha (English: Road and Talent, Nepali: सडक र प्रतिभा) is a Nepali language collection of short stories by Parijat.

== See also ==
- Shirishko Phool
- Mahattahin
- Paribhasit Aankhaharu
- Toribari, Bata Ra Sapanaharu
- Baishko Manche
- Antarmukhi
