= Maile Najanmayeko Chhoro =

1964 Nepali novel by Parijat

- Author: Parijat
- Original title: मैले नजन्माएको छोरो
- Language: Nepali
- Genre: Short Story
- Publisher: Sajha Prakashan
- Publication place: Nepal
- Media type: Print (Paperback)

Maile Najanmayeko Chhoro (eng. The Son I Didn't Gave Birth To) (Nepali: मैले नजन्माएको छोरो is a Nepali language short story by Parijat.

== See also ==
- Shirishko Phool
- Mahattahin
- Paribhasit Aankhaharu
- Toribari, Bata Ra Sapanaharu
- Baishko Manche
- Antarmukhi
