= Usle Rojeko Bato =

Nepali novel by Parijat

- Author: Parijat
- Original title: उसले रोजेको बाटो
- Language: Nepali
- Genre: Novel
- Publisher: Sajha Prakashan
- Publication place: Nepal
- Media type: Print (Paperback)

Usle Rojeko Bato (eng. His Selected Path) (Nepali: उसले रोजेको बाटो is a Nepali language novel by Parijat.

== See also ==
- Shirishko Phool
- Mahattahin
- Paribhasit Aankhaharu
- Toribari, Bata Ra Sapanaharu
- Baishko Manche
- Antarmukhi
