= Parkhal Bhitra Ra Bahira =

1964 Nepali novel by Parijat

- Author: Parijat
- Original title: पर्खाल भित्र र बाहिर
- Language: Nepali
- Genre: Novel
- Publisher: Sajha Prakashan
- Publication place: Nepal
- Media type: Print (Paperback)

Parkhal Bhitra Ra Bahira (eng. Inside and Outside the Wall) (Nepali: पर्खाल भित्र र बाहिर is a Nepali language novel by Parijat.

== See also ==
- Shirishko Phool
- Mahattahin
- Paribhasit Aankhaharu
- Toribari, Bata Ra Sapanaharu
- Baishko Manche
- Antarmukhi
