= Belaet Tira Baralida =

Nepali travelogue by Tara Nath Sharma

- Cover page of the first edition
- Author: Dr. Tara Nath Sharma
- Original title: बेलाइततिर बरालिँदा
- Language: Nepali
- Genre: Travelogue
- Publisher: Sajha Prakashan
- Publication date: 1967 (2026 B.S.)
- Publication place: Nepal
- Pages: 161
- Awards: Madan Puraskar
- ISBN: 9789993340645

Belaet Tira Baralida (Nepali: बेलाइततिर बरालिँदा, lit. 'Wandering in Britain') is a travelogue by Dr.Tara Nath Sharma. It was published in 1970 (2026 BS) by Sajha Prakashan and won the prestigious Madan Puraskar for that year. The author wrote the book under the pen name Tanasarma (Nepali: तानासर्मा). The book was reprinted by Manjari Publication in 2017 (2074 BS).

== Plot ==
Belaet is the Nepali name for Britain. This book is a memoir of his travel in the United Kingdom and one of the earliest modern travelogue in Nepali literature. Born and raised in the remote village of Barabote in Ilam, Taranath's arrival in Kathmandu from there was a big deal at that time. The book includes the highs and lows of the author's travel in Britain.

== Awards ==
The book won the prestigious Madan Puraskar for the year 1969 Madan Puraskar.

== See also ==
- Alikhit
- Basain
- Ghamka Pailaharu
- Shirishko Phool
