= Bhattarai =

Bhattarai भट्टराई
- Bhattarai surname in Devanagari font
- Language: Nepali, Doteli

Origin
- Language: Khas
- Origin: Nepal

Other names
- Variant form: Bhattrai
- Derivatives: Sindhuley Bhattarai, Samriddha Bhattarai, Saalukhey Bhattarai, Gamlangey Bhattarai, Chisungkhey Bhattarai, Gulmeli Bhattarai, Lamidaandey Bhattarai
- See also: Pokharel, Poudel, Khanal, Bhandari, Subedi

Bhattarai (Nepali: भट्टराई) or Bhattrai is a Nepalese surname. Typically those with the surname belong to the Brahmins or Chettris of Nepal.

== Etymology ==
Bhatta means scholar in Sanskrit and Rai means King. Bhattarai were ancient Kings who later became priests.

== Notable people with the surname in Nepal ==
- Krishna Prasad Bhattarai, Former Prime Minister (Nepali Congress)
- Baburam Bhattarai, former Prime Minister of Nepal.
- Nabin K Bhattarai, Pop singer
- Amrit Bhattarai, Nepali cricketer
- Durga Prasad Bhattarai, Nepali diplomat
- Krishna Dharabasi, born Krishna Bhattarai. Author of Radha (Novel), Jhola
