= Teen Ghumti (novel) =

1968 novel by Bishweshwar Prasad Koirala

- Cover page
- Author: Bishweshwar Prasad Koirala
- Original title: तीन घुम्ती
- Language: Nepali
- Genre: Psychological fiction
- Set in: Kathmandu
- Published: 1968
- Publisher: Sajha Prakashan
- Publication date: 1968
- Publication place: Nepali
- Media type: Print
- Pages: 74
- ISBN: 9789993328940
- Preceded by: Hitler ra Yahudee
- Followed by: Sumnima

Teen Ghumti (Nepali: तीन घुम्ती, lit. 'Three turnings') is a Nepali novel by Bishweshwar Prasad Koirala. It was published in 1968 by Sajha Prakashan. It is Koirala's second novel and fourth book. Koirala was the first elected prime minister of Nepal. He was prisoned multiple time during his political life and used to write in the prison. He wrote this book while he was imprisoned in January 1964.

Koirala is considered the master of psychological fiction in Nepali literature. His novels and stories usually features a prominent and strong female character.

== Synopsis ==
It is set during the Panchayat regime in Nepal. Indramaya, a Newa girl falls in love with Pitamber, who belongs to Brahmin family. Amidst the difficulties of taboo regarding inter-caste marriage in Nepal, they get married. For his political activism, Pitamber is jailed by the Panchayat government. During his imprisonment, Indramaya falls for his friend Ramesh and gets pregnant. The novel depicts the psychological struggle of Indramaya.

== Adaptation ==
The book was adapted into a 2016 film of the same name. It was directed by Babu Ram Dhakal. Garima Panta played the role of Indramaya and Dhurba Dutta and Sushant Karki played the role of Pitamber and Ramesh respectively.

== See also ==
- Sumnima
- Narendra Dai
- Modiaain
