= Ralpha =

Cultural movement in Nepal

- Part of Nepali cultural movement
- Native name: राल्फा आन्दोलन
- Location: Nepal
- Type: Cultural movement

Ralpha (Nepali: राल्फा आन्दोलन) was a leftist cultural group of Nepal which produced various songs and literatures to protest against the government. They began as a politically neutral group primarily due to problem with Radio Nepal regarding non-payment of royalty but it gradually turned into a cultural movement. They produced protest songs, poems and novels against the autocratic rule of Panchyat.

== History ==
Narayan Bhakta Shrestha (Rayan), a member of Ralpha, was denied the royalty by Radio Nepal for his song/poem collection for the period of 2021-2023 BS. Royalty was drawn out from their account by someone else by forging documents. When the same forging was identified by other authors and poets, the victims formed a group to protest against Radio Nepal. One day Parijat called all the authors and poet and gave a pen-name for each of them and formed the group of Ralpha. It happened in 2024 BS (mid 1960s. As explained by poet, Manjul (poet), the word Ralpha does not have any meaning. Ralpha was initially influenced by the contemporary trends of nihilism and existentialism and partially influenced by Nietzsche's proclamation that “God is Dead.” Ralpha was also influenced by Albert Camus and Jean Paul Sartre. After its formation, many members of Ralpha worked together with the Coordination Committee in Eastern Nepal, which was later called Communist Party of Nepal (Marxist–Leninist).

== Notable contributions ==
- Shirishko Phool (Mimosa Flower), a novel by Parijat
- Chekudolma a novel by Manjul
- Gaun Gaun Bata Utha, a song by the group
- Euta Marera Jaanchha, Haami Hajaara Hunchhaun, a song by the group
- Neelo Noon (Blue salt), a cultural protest program in 2025 BS

== Social significance ==
Songs by Ralpha is used time to time during protest in Nepal. In 2006 Nepalese revolution, their songs were widely used in the protest rallies. The Maoist movement in (1996-2006) also used their songs widely for cultural programs. Their songs were banned time to time by the government.

== Members ==
- Raameshwor Shrestha (Raamesh)
- Arim
- Manjul
- Parijat
- Ganesh Rasik
- Narayan Bhakta Shrestha (Rayan)
