= Naya Sadak Ko Geet =

1961 book by Ramesh Bikal

Naya Sadak ko Geet
- Cover page
- Author: Ramesh Bikal
- Original title: नयाँ सडकको गीत
- Language: Nepali
- Genre: Short stories
- Publisher: Sajha Prakashan
- Publication date: 1961
- Publication place: Nepal
- Media type: Print (Paperback)
- Pages: 91
- Awards: Madan Puraskar
- ISBN: 9789993329848
- Preceded by: Birano Deshma
- Followed by: 13 Ramaila Kathaharu

Naya Sadak ko Geet (Nepali: नयाँ सडकको गीत, lit. 'Song of the New Road') is a collection of short stories by Ramesh Bikal. It was published on 1961 by Sajha Publications. It won the Madan Puraskar in the same year. It is Bikal's second book.

== Synopsis ==
The stories are set in New Road, a financial hub and high street in Kathmandu. The main protagonist of the book is a blind man named Jeevan Baral. The stories in the book depicts the exploitation and discrimination faced by Jeevan. Written in the context of the end of the Rana period and the renaissance of democracy in Nepal, the story inside reveals many aspects of the social life of the time. This stories in the book tell a lot about the psychology and socio-economic condition of people of different classes and levels at that time.

== Theme ==
Bikal's stories are a realistic representation of the exploitation, oppression, deceit, hypocrisy, deception, inhumane treatment by the upper classes of the society and their cronies and the life of the lower class people who are forced to endure such activities and behaviors. Bikal's stories, influenced by Marxist thought, seem to have an artistic progressive tone, not a slogan. He exposes the selfish and vile tendencies of the people through the stories o the book.

== Awards ==
The book won the prestigious Madan Puraskar for the year 2018 BS (1961). It is the first short story collection to win the Madan Puraskar.

== Adaptation ==
The book was adapted into a play by Yubraj Ghimire in 2019 and performed in Shilpee theatre.

== See also ==
- Narendra Dai
- Shirishko Phool
- Mann
