= Basain =

1957 Nepali novel by Lil Bahadur Chettri

- Cover page of the book
- Author: Lil Bahadur Chettri
- Original title: बसाइँ
- Translator: Michael Hutt
- Language: Nepali
- Publisher: Sajha Prakashan
- Publication date: 1957 (2014 BS)
- Publication place: Nepal
- Pages: 62
- ISBN: 9789993328964
- OCLC: 800708623

Basain (Nepali: बसाइँ, lit. 'Settlement') is a 1957 Nepali novel written by Lil Bahadur Chettri. It was published by Sajha Prakashan and is included in the curriculum of Tribhuvan University. Chettri, an Assamese Nepali writer wrote this book incorporating the experience of different Nepalese immigrants in India. The book depicts life of a poor farmer and his family in a rural village in hilly Nepal and the circumstances under which they are forced to emigrate away from their village.

== Synopsis ==
The book is set in a nameless hilly village in Eastern Nepal. Dhan Bahadur Basnet is a poor farmer living with his wife, sister and a son. The book shows his struggle in the village and how he is deceived by others. The book shows the circumstances under which poor Nepali people have to migrate from their home to places in India for employment. The caste and gender discrimination, poverty, and injustice are the major theme in this book. The book shows how rich people suppress poor people and further push theme towards poverty instead of uplifting them.

== Characters ==
- Dhan Bahadur Basnet 'Dhane', the main protagonist of the book is a poor farmer in rural Nepal
- Jhumavati Basnet, Dhane's younger sister
- Maina, Dhane's wife
- Dhane and Maina's infant child
- Budho baidar, a moneylender
- Rikute, an Indian Gorkha recruit from the neighbouring village
- Thuli, Jhuma's friend
- Mukhiya, the village head
- Mote Karki, Dhane's helpful friend
- Leute Damai, a villager from Dhane's village
- Nande Dhakal, a villager
- Luintel, a rich landlord
- Sane Gharti, Luintel's servant
- Budhe Kami, a villager

== Adaptation and translation ==
The novel was adapted into a Nepali movie by Subash Gajurel in 2003. The movie was Nepal's official entry to the Academy Award for Best International Feature Film, however the film was not nominated.

The novel was translation into English as Mountains Painted With Turmeric by Michael Hutt.

== See also ==
- Alikhit
- Shirishko Phool
- Radha
