= Dhruba Chandra Gautam =

Nepalese novel writer (born 1969 )

Akhyan Purush Dhruba Chandra Gautam
- ध्रुवचन्द्र गौतम
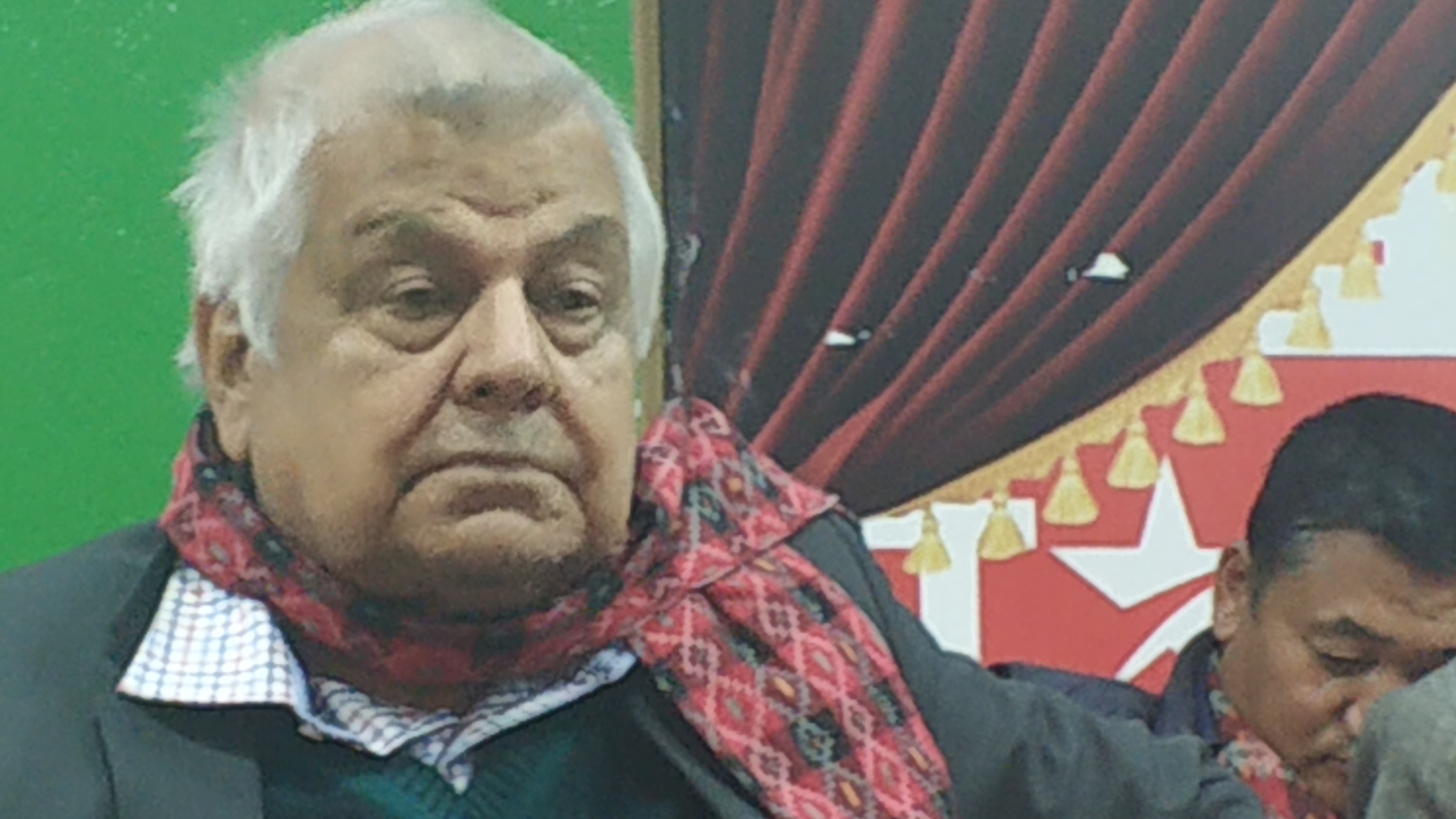
- Dhurba Chandra Gautam in a literary event
- Born: 16 December 1943 (age 82); Birgunj, Nepal
- Occupation: Writer
- Relatives: Dhanush Chandra Gautam(Brother)
- Writing career
- Language: Nepali
- Genres: Fiction, Short stories
- Notable awards: Madan Puraskar 2040 B.S. for Alikhit; Sajha Purashkar 2059 B.S. for Tathakathit

Dhruba Chandra Gautam (Nepali: ध्रुवचन्द्र गौतम) is a Nepalese novel writer. He has authored over 60 stories and novels, most of which address contemporary social issues. He is known as Akhyan Purush(towering personality) in Nepali literary circle.

== Early age ==
Gautam was born on 16 December 1943, in Birgunj, Nepal. He used to write songs, poetry and plays from an early age. He grew up reading Nepali classics as well as the Hindi translations of the works of Bengali writers, Rabindranath Tagore and Bankim Chandra Chatterjee.

In the early 1960s, he moved to Kathmandu and published a poem in the literary magazine Ruprekha and a novel, Antya Pachi(Nepali: अन्त्य पछी, lit. 'After the end'). He earned a Master's degree in Nepali. He also taught at Tribhuvan University and some other private institutions. While in Kathmandu, he read the works of European writers such as Oscar Wilde, Franz Kafka, Jean-Paul Sartre and Sigmund Freud.

== Professional life ==
In 1983 (2040 B.S.), He wrote Alikhit for which he was felicitated with the prestigious Madan Puraskar. He was one of the founding members of PEN Center in Nepal with writers Greta Rana, Toya Gurung, Ashesh Malla, Bhuwan Dhungana, etc. and librarian Shanti Mishra.

The Library of Congress, New Delhi has 1 to 32 works by him.

== Notable works ==
His works include:

- Dapi(1976)
- Kattel Sir ko Chot Patak(1980)
- Alikhit(1983)
- Agnidatta+Agnidatta(1996)
- Swa. Hira Devi ko Khoji(1998)
- Foolko Atanka(1999)
- Tathakathit(2002)
- Aakash Bibhajit Chha (10 co-authors)
- Dhruba Chandra ka Ekaunna Katha
- Tyo Euta Kura
- Andhayaro Dipma
- Gautamka Kehi Pratinidhi Katha

== Awards ==
- Sajha Purashkar (2004)
- Madan Puraskar(2040 B.S.) for Alikhit

== See also ==
- List of Nepali writers
- Parijat (writer)
- Greta Rana
- Toya Gurung
- Laxmi Prasad Devkota
