= Teen Ghumti =

Teen Ghumti may refer to:

- Teen Ghumti (novel), a 1968 Nepali novel by BP Koirala
- Teen Ghumti (film), a 2016 Nepali film, based on the novel
