= Vovinam at the 2009 Asian Indoor Games =

- Venue: Quân Khu 7 Gymnasium
- Dates: 31 October – 2 November 2009

Vovinam at the 2009 Asian Indoor Games was held in Ho Chi Minh City, Vietnam from October 31 to November 2. All events of this sport took place in Quân Khu 7 Gymnasium.

== Medalists ==
=== Men ===
Event	Gold	Silver	Bronze
Five gate form (Ngũ môn quyền)	Putu Yudi Surya Pratama; Indonesia	Sirivanh Khamphi; Laos	Mohsen Ahmadi; Iran
Dual machete form (Song luyện mã tấu)	Vietnam; Trần Thế Thường; Lâm Đông Vượng	Cambodia; Prak Sovanny; Tep Chiveaksokhom	Indonesia; Kadek Prayogi; Komang Harik Adiputra
Leg attack techniques (Đòn chân tấn công)	Vietnam; Huỳnh Khắc Nguyên; Nguyễn Bình Định; Phan Ngọc Tới; Nguyễn Văn Cường	Cambodia; Nuth Sreyroath; Prak Sovanny; Kat Sopheak; Chan Rothana	India; Haobijam Kanta Singh; Devrao Shankarrao Kapse; Shashank Bajrang Kathade; Rahul Kumar
Multiple weapon (Đa luyện vũ khí nam)	Vietnam; Nguyễn Văn Thới; Trần Thanh Sơn; Võ Trần Hoàng Mai; Cao Vũ Linh	Laos; Etsada Sihalath; Magkeua Sonexay; Sosomsy Anousack; Nouhack Vandoengkoe	Iran; Reza Azordeh; Morteza Farnad; Alireza Jadidi; Mohsen Ahmadi
Fighting 55 kg	Thân Lại Kim Long; Vietnam	San Socheat; Cambodia	Putu Yudi Surya Pratama; Indonesia
Fighting 55 kg	Thân Lại Kim Long; Vietnam	San Socheat; Cambodia	Magkeua Sonexay; Laos
Fighting 60 kg	Võ Nguyên Linh; Vietnam	Mohammad Hossein Mirakhori; Iran	Nuth Sereyratha; Cambodia
Fighting 60 kg	Võ Nguyên Linh; Vietnam	Mohammad Hossein Mirakhori; Iran	Chongtham Mahadeva; India
Fighting 65 kg	Alireza Jadidi; Iran	Sirivanh Khamphi; Laos	Deven Moirangthem; India
Fighting 65 kg	Alireza Jadidi; Iran	Sirivanh Khamphi; Laos	None awarded
Fighting 70 kg	Nguyễn Minh Tính; Vietnam	Morteza Farnad; Iran	Nouhack Vandoengkoe; Laos
Fighting 70 kg	Nguyễn Minh Tính; Vietnam	Morteza Farnad; Iran	Chan Rothana; Cambodia

=== Women ===
Event	Gold	Silver	Bronze
Dragon tiger form (Long hổ quyền)	Pratiksha Santosh Shinde; India	Monir Ahmadi; Iran	Nang Vilay; Cambodia
Dual sword form (Song luyện kiếm)	Indonesia; Ni Dyah Purnama Sari; Dewa Ayu Komang Ariani	India; Pratiksha Santosh Shinde; Akanksha Sahai	Laos; Vongphakdy Manaythong; Noudsalin Maythong
Fighting 50 kg	Noudsalin Maythong; Laos	Pratiksha Santosh Shinde; India	Ni Dyah Purnama Sari; Indonesia
Fighting 50 kg	Noudsalin Maythong; Laos	Pratiksha Santosh Shinde; India	None awarded
Fighting 55 kg	Phan Thị Ngọc Hân; Vietnam	Viengkham Latdavanh; Laos	Nuth Sreyroath; Cambodia
Fighting 55 kg	Phan Thị Ngọc Hân; Vietnam	Viengkham Latdavanh; Laos	Razieh Roustaei; Iran

=== Mixed ===
Event	Gold	Silver	Bronze
Female self-defense (Tự vệ nữ)	Vietnam; Nguyễn Văn Cường; Phạm Thị Phượng	Cambodia; Tep Chiveaksokhom; Nang Vilay	Indonesia; Komang Harik Adiputra; Ayu Kadek Puspita Sari
Multiple weapon (Đa luyện vũ khí nữ)	Cambodia; Nuth Sereytatha; Prak Sovanny; Tep Tem Mony; Nuth Sreyroath	India; Devrao Shankarrao Kapse; Shashank Bajrang Kathade; Rahul Kumar; Pratiksha Santosh Shinde	Indonesia; Putu Yudi Surya Pratama; Kadek Prayogi; Komang Harik Adiputra; Dewa Ayu Komang Ariani

== Medal table ==
Rank	Nation	Gold	Silver	Bronze	Total
1	Vietnam (VIE)	8	0	0	8
2	Indonesia (INA)	2	0	5	7
3	Cambodia (CAM)	1	4	4	9
4	Laos (LAO)	1	4	3	8
5	India (IND)	1	3	3	7
5	Iran (IRI)	1	3	3	7
Totals (6 entries)		14	14	18	46

== Results ==
=== Men ===
==== Five gate form ====
1 November

Rank	Athlete	Score
1st place, gold medalist(s)	Putu Yudi Surya Pratama (INA)	288
2nd place, silver medalist(s)	Sirivanh Khamphi (LAO)	278
3rd place, bronze medalist(s)	Mohsen Ahmadi (IRI)	276

==== Dual machete form ====
2 November

Rank	Team	Score
1st place, gold medalist(s)	Vietnam (VIE); Trần Thế Thường; Lâm Đông Vượng	294
2nd place, silver medalist(s)	Cambodia (CAM); Prak Sovanny; Tep Chiveaksokhom	275
3rd place, bronze medalist(s)	Indonesia (INA); Kadek Prayogi; Komang Harik Adiputra	272

==== Leg attack techniques ====
31 October

Rank	Team	Score
1st place, gold medalist(s)	Vietnam (VIE)	294
2nd place, silver medalist(s)	Cambodia (CAM)	270
3rd place, bronze medalist(s)	India (IND)	254

==== Multiple weapon ====
31 October

Rank	Team	Score
1st place, gold medalist(s)	Vietnam (VIE)	292
2nd place, silver medalist(s)	Laos (LAO)	276
3rd place, bronze medalist(s)	Iran (IRI)	268

==== Fighting 55 kg ====
31 October

Quarterfinals		Semifinals		Final
		San Socheat (CAM)	10
		Magkeua Sonexay (LAO)	−2
				San Socheat (CAM)	2
Thân Lại Kim Long (VIE)	WD			Thân Lại Kim Long (VIE)	8
Haobijam Kanta Singh (IND)		Thân Lại Kim Long (VIE)	DQ
		Putu Yudi Surya Pratama (INA)

==== Fighting 60 kg ====
1 November

Semifinals		Final
Chongtham Mahadeva (IND)	−1
Võ Nguyên Linh (VIE)	4	Võ Nguyên Linh (VIE)	12
Nuth Sereyratha (CAM)		Mohammad Hossein Mirakhori (IRI)	4
Mohammad Hossein Mirakhori (IRI)	KO

==== Fighting 65 kg ====
2 November

Semifinals		Final
Alireza Jadidi (IRI)	6
Deven Moirangthem (IND)	−2	Alireza Jadidi (IRI)	10
		Sirivanh Khamphi (LAO)	−2

==== Fighting 70 kg ====
2 November

Semifinals		Final
Nouhack Vandoengkoe (LAO)
Morteza Farnad (IRI)	DQ	Morteza Farnad (IRI)	2
Nguyễn Minh Tính (VIE)	11	Nguyễn Minh Tính (VIE)	4
Chan Rothana (CAM)	3

=== Women ===
==== Dragon tiger form ====
1 November

Rank	Athlete	Score
1st place, gold medalist(s)	Pratiksha Santosh Shinde (IND)	285
2nd place, silver medalist(s)	Monir Ahmadi (IRI)	279
3rd place, bronze medalist(s)	Nang Vilay (CAM)	274

==== Dual sword form ====
2 November

Rank	Team	Score
1st place, gold medalist(s)	Indonesia (INA); Ni Dyah Purnama Sari; Dewa Ayu Komang Ariani	285
2nd place, silver medalist(s)	India (IND); Pratiksha Santosh Shinde; Akanksha Sahai	278
3rd place, bronze medalist(s)	Laos (LAO); Vongphakdy Manaythong; Noudsalin Maythong	271

==== Fighting 50 kg ====
1 November

Semifinals		Final
Ni Dyah Purnama Sari (INA)	−1
Pratiksha Santosh Shinde (IND)	7	Pratiksha Santosh Shinde (IND)	0
		Noudsalin Maythong (LAO)	4

==== Fighting 55 kg ====
31 October

Semifinals		Final
Nuth Sreyroath (CAM)	0
Viengkham Latdavanh (LAO)	7	Viengkham Latdavanh (LAO)	−1
Razieh Roustaei (IRI)	−2	Phan Thị Ngọc Hân (VIE)	6
Phan Thị Ngọc Hân (VIE)	9

=== Mixed ===
==== Female self-defense ====
31 October

Rank	Team	Score
1st place, gold medalist(s)	Vietnam (VIE); Nguyễn Văn Cường; Phạm Thị Phượng	294
2nd place, silver medalist(s)	Cambodia (CAM); Tep Chiveaksokhom; Nang Vilay	273
3rd place, bronze medalist(s)	Indonesia (INA); Komang Harik Adiputra; Ayu Kadek Puspita Sari	272
4	Laos (LAO); Sosomsy Anousack; Viengkham Latdavanh	267
5	India (IND); Rahul Kumar; Akanksha Sahai	266

==== Multiple weapon ====
31 October

Rank	Team	Score
1st place, gold medalist(s)	Cambodia (CAM)	281
2nd place, silver medalist(s)	India (IND)	278
3rd place, bronze medalist(s)	Indonesia (INA)	274
