= Meghraj Sharma Nepal =

Nepali singer and writer

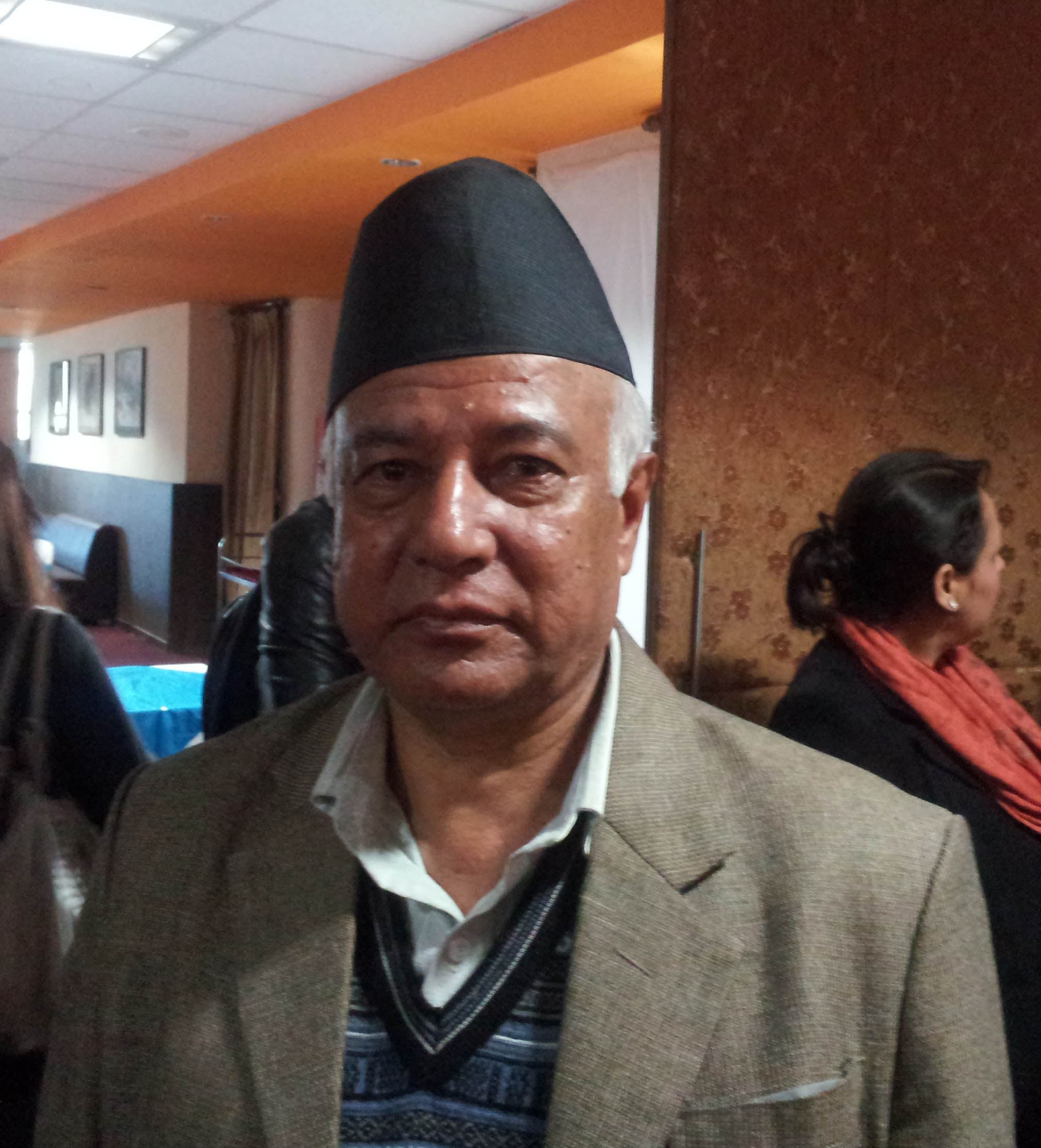
- Manjul in 2014
- Native name: मेघराज शर्मा नेपाल
- Born: 1947 (age 78–79) Bhojpur, Nepal
- Occupation: Poet, singer, politician

Meghraj Sharma Nepal (Nepali:मेघराज शर्मा नेपाल), popularly known by his pen-name Manjul (Nepali मञ्जुल) is a Nepalese singer, writer and poet. He was born in Falgun 2003 B.S.(1947 CE) in Bhojpur. His songs and poem deals with the social issues.

== Personal life ==
After completing his school in Bhojpur, Manjul came to Dharan for higher studies where he met the musical group Sangeet Sangh Samuha and began to write lyrics for them. He learnt music from the same group. Manjul received his Bachelor in Arts degree in 1973.

In the 1960s, Manjul became part of a musical group called Ralpha as a songwriter as replacement of Ganesh Rashik. He travelled throughout Nepal with the group. The goal of the group was not only to perform, but had a political mission. He became a committed communist worker, traveling from village to village with singer Raamesh, singing songs against Panchayat rule. Manjul later abandoned all cultural work and aimed to work for political parties. He also works as professor of Nepali language at Bishwa Bhasa Campus.

== Works ==
Publication year	Title	Genere	References
2024 BS	Sahili moriharu (साहिँली मोरीलाई)	Poem	
2026 BS	Cheku Dolma (छेकु डोल्मा)	Novel	
2044 BS	Samjhanaka Pailaharu (सम्झनाका पाइलाहरू)	Essay	
NA	Manjul ka naya kabitaharu (मञ्जुलका नयाँ कविताहरू)	Poem	
2047 BS	Jane hoina Dai Alapot? (जाने होइन दाइ आलापोट ?)	Essay	
2055 BS	Chokati Kabita (चोकटी कविता)	Poem and Essay	
2055 BS	Siddhicharanharu (सिद्धिचरणहरू)	Poem	
2055 BS	Mirtyu Kabita (मृत्यु कविता)	Poem	
2068 BS	Pahadjasto Batojasto ma (पहाडजस्तो-बाटोजस्तो म)	Biography	

== Awards ==
Some notable awards received by Manjul are listed below:

- Ambikadevi Puraskar
- Rastriya Prativa Puraskar
- Sajha Puraskar for Mrityu Kabita
