= Sumnima =

1969 novel by Bishweshwar Prasad Koirala

- Cover page
- Author: BP Koirala
- Original title: सुम्निमा
- Translator: Tara Nath Sharma
- Language: Nepali
- Genre: Fiction
- Published: Sajha Publications
- Publication date: 1969
- Publication place: Nepal
- Media type: Print
- Pages: 94
- ISBN: 9788173030482
- Preceded by: Teen Ghumti
- Followed by: Narendra Dai

Sumnima (Nepali: सुम्निमा) is a Nepali novel by B. P. Koirala. The book was published in 1969 by Sajha Prakashan. and describes a story of a Kirat woman and a Brahmin boy. Koirala was the first elected prime minister of Nepal. Koirala wrote the book in eight days (June 21 to 28, 1964) during his imprisonment in Sundarijal jail.

== Synopsis ==
Sumnima is a psychological love story between a Brahmin boy named Somdutta and a Kirati girl, the title of this novel, Sumnima. Somdutta is devoted to Brahmin rituals worshipping the Hindu gods. He practises celibacy and sex for him is a mode of reproduction only. Sumnima is very down to earth and knows how to live naturally. They spend a long time on the Koshi riverside and develop a deep affinity with each other. After their separation, Somdutta knows that Sumnima has become deeply rooted in his heart. The sexual desire for Sumnima haunts Somdutta till the end of his life. He realizes that the celibacy education, which should be a ladder to salvation and austerity, instead kept him away from true happiness and experiencing life.

The novel discusses the issues of minority, cultural differences and ethnic consciousness through innocent characters. It documents the conflict and problems among the people living in the same area.

== Translation ==
The book was translated into English as Sumnima by Taranath Sharma in 2005.

== See also ==
- Narendra Dai
- Modiaain
- Alikhit
