= Baburam Dhakal =

Nepalese film director

- Occupation: Film director
- Known for: Dulahi (2011)

Baburam Dhakal is a film director active in the Nepali film industry. He has directed several successful Nepali movies, such as Dulahi, 9 O’clock and Parkhi Rakha Hai. Dhakal is also a screenwriter and a producer.

Dhakal has been involved in the film industry since 2000, when he was an assistant director for the TV series Rista, broadcast on Zee TV in India. The first TV series he directed was Nalekhiyeko Saino in 2005, broadcast on Kantipur Television Network. The first Nepali feature film he directed was Parkhi Rakha Hai in 2009, produced by Diya Films Pvt. Ltd. In 2015, he produced and directed the upcoming Nepali feature film Teen Ghumti.

== Career ==
=== Television series ===
Year	Name
2001	Rista
2002	Dhun
2002	Kyuki Saas bhi bhau thi
2003	Kasautii Zindagii Kay
2004	Nalekhiyeko Saino
2005	Khusi pal var ko
2007	Maiti
2008	Dial the 100
2013	Pari banda

=== Filmography ===
Year	Name
2009	Parkhi rakha hai
2010	Dulahi
2013	9 O'Clock
2015	Teen Ghumti

=== Awards ===
Baburam Dhakal has achieved the following awards:

- CG Digital D Cine awards, Best Director
- Box Office Film Awards
- Nefta Film Award
