= Dhanush Chandra Gautam =

Nepalese writer (1932–2006)

Dha. Cha. Gotame ध.च गोतामे
- Born: Dhanush Chandra Gautam; December 26, 1932; Mahottari district
- Died: 2006 (aged 73–74); Kathmandu
- Occupations: Writer, Editor
- Notable work: Ghamka Pailaharu
- Spouse: Shanti Devi Gautam
- Parents: Govinda Chandra Gautam (father); Deepwati Devi Gautam (mother)
- Relatives: Dhruba Chandra Gautam (brother)
- Awards: Madan Puraskar, Sajha Puraskar

Dhanush Chandra Gautam (Nepali: धनुषचन्द्र गौतम; 1932–2006), professionally known as Dha. Cha. Gotame was a Nepalese writer. He published multiple books and edited multiple newspaper and magazines in his lifetime. He won the prestigious Madan Puraskar for his novel Ghamka Pailaharu.

== Early life and education ==
He was born on December 26, 1932 (Poush 12, 1989 BS) in Manarakatti village of Mahottari district to father Govinda Chandra Gautam and mother Deepwati Devi Gautam. He was expelled from his school for being involved in anti-Rana politics. He completed his matriculation from India. He got his IA degree from GBB College, Muzaffarpur. After graduation, he became a high level member of Communist Party of Nepal, established by Pushpa Lal Shrestha.

== Literary career ==
He started his literary career by publishing a story called Parda in Sewa, a monthly literary magazine from Birgunj in 2008 BS (c. 1951–52). Although he had penned some poems and titled the manuscript as Niharika, he never published it. He started a literary magazine called Bachhita in 2015 BS (c. 1958–59). He additionally worked as an editor for Filingo (weekly) and Jhankar magazines.

== Notable works ==
- Ghamka Pailaharu
- Yaha Dekhi Tyaha Samma
- Kalanatar
- Sagya Sarbanam
- Samjhana ka Galchhedaharu
- Teen Baas
- Utarotar
- Aroha Abaroha

== Awards ==
He won the prestigious Madan Puraskar and Sajha Puraskar for his novel, Ghamka Pailaharu. He again won the Sajha Puraskar for Yaha Dekhi Tyaha Samma. He was awarded with Sarbashrestha Pandulipi Prize in 2061 BS (c. 2006).

== Personal life ==
He was married to Shanta Devi Gautam. His brother Dhurba Chandra Gautam is also a renowned writer. He died in 2063 BS (2006 AD).

== See also ==
- Dhruba Chandra Gautam
- Madan Mani Dixit
- Madhav Prasad Ghimire
