= Ramesh Bikal =

Nepalese writer and activist

- रमेश विकल
- Bikal in his youth
- Born: Rameshwor Prasad Chalise; November 14, 1928; Arubari, Kathmandu, Nepal
- Died: December 17, 2008 (aged 80); Kathmandu
- Occupation: Writer
- Notable work: Naya Sadak ko Geet; Abiral Bagdacha Indrawati
- Spouse: Sushila
- Parents: Chandra Shekhar Chalise (father); Chhayadevi Chalise (mother)
- Awards: Madan Puraskar

Rameshwor Sharma Chalise better known as Ramesh Bikal (Nepali: रमेश बिकल) (born 1928, near Gokarna, Nepal in the Kathmandu Valley died 2008) was a Nepalese writer and painter who was known for his works portraying rural life and the lives of common people in Nepal.

== Early life and education ==
He received a B.Ed. in 1960, and worked in education. His early stories had socialist and anti-establishment themes. As a result, he was imprisoned three times between 1949 and 1960. In more recent work, he has focused on sexual relations.

== Awards ==
Bikal was the first short story writer to be given the Madan Puraskar award. He received the Daulat Bikram Bista Aakhyan Samman Award in 2008 for six decades of contributions to fiction writing in Nepal.

== Foundation ==
In tribute to his memory, Ramesh Vikal Literary Foundation has been established at Arubari, Gokarneshwor.

== Works ==
- Birano Deshma ("In an Empty Land"), 1959
- Naya Sadak ko Geet ("The Song of New Road"), 1962
- 13 Ramaila Kathaharu ("Thirteen Enjoyable Stories"), 1967
- Aaja Feri Arko Tanna Ferincha ("Today Yet Another Bedspread is Changed"), 1967
- Euta Budo Violin Aashawari ko Dhoon ma ("An Old Violin in the Ashāvari Tune"), 1968
- Agenāko Ḍilmā ("On the Edge of the Hearth"), 1968
- Urmilā Bhāujū ("Sister-in-Law Urmilā"), 1968
- 21 Ramālilā Kathāharū ("Twenty-one Enjoyable Stories"), 1968
- Mangal Grahama Bigyan("Bigyan(Science) in Mars")
- Abiral Bagdachha Indrawati ("Indrawati flows continuously")
