= Narendra Dai =

1970 book by Bishweshwar Prasad Koirala

- Author: B.P. Koirala
- Original title: नरेन्द्र दाइ
- Language: Nepali
- Genre: Psychology
- Publisher: Sajha Prakasan
- Publication date: 1970
- Publication place: Nepal
- Media type: Print
- Pages: 64
- ISBN: 978-99933-2-841-4
- Preceded by: Sumnima
- Followed by: Modiaain

Narendra Dai (Nepali: नरेन्द्र दाइ) is a Nepali novel by B.P. Koirala. The book was published in 1970 by Sajha Prakashan. Koirala was the first democratically elected prime minister of Nepal. Most of his writings feature Nepalese women as the protagonists.

== Synopsis ==
The novel has many Characters, viz. Narendra dai, Gauri, Munaria, Sannani and the narrator. Munaria is a poor girl living with her father and working at Narendra's home. Narendra is a wealthy man married with Gauri, but he dislikes her and loves Munaria. So a love triangle develops in between them as Gauri likes Narendra. Narendra has huge name and fame in the community. The family tries to develop a well relation between Gauri & Narendra but fails every time. The narrator always feels sorry for Gauri and dislikes Munaria. Kaptanni Aama is the cause of twist in the novel as she prefers racial discrimination. One day Munaria gives water to a Sarkee man which is of low standard and Kaptanni aama sees this. Kaptanni aama becomes angry and throws unorthodox words upon Munaria. Narendra becomes angry too with Kaptanni aama and vows to leave the village as no one was able to convince him. The next day not only Narendra but Munaria too leaves the village with him. As the narrator grows he went Banaras, India for higher studies. One day he sees Munaria in the city. At that stage, he finds that Narendra had already left for village due to tuberculosis and will never be with Munaria. Munaria is living her saddest life compelling sharing her body with Narendra's betrayer friend. Narrator slowly feels that Munaria is good girl. On the other hand, Narendra reaches the village and loves Gauri living happily. But one day Narendra dies due to tuberculosis. Gauri sti becomes happy thinking that she get love from her husband although at last but finally grabbed it. Thus she lives a life of widow happily and don't throw Sindoor and Potay as other widow's do. Some years after narrator gets a news that Gauri died in 1990 earthquake after 9 days of injury because whole house fall down upon her and unable to escape.

== See also ==
- Sumnima
- Modiaain
- Ghamka Pailaharu
