= Modiaain =

1980 novel by Bisheshwar Prasad Koirala

- Cover page
- Author: Bishweshwar Prasad Koirala
- Original title: मोदिआइन
- Language: Nepali
- Genre: Mythological fiction
- Publisher: Sajha Prakashan
- Publication date: 1980
- Publication place: Nepal
- Media type: Print
- Pages: 42
- ISBN: 9789993325987
- OCLC: 1039732543
- Preceded by: Narendra Dai
- Followed by: Sweta Bhairavi

Modiaain (Nepali: मोदिआइन, lit. 'Grocer's wife') is a 1980 Nepali novella by Bishweshwar Prasad Koirala. Koirala was the first elected prime minister of Nepal. He was prisoned multiple time during his political life and used to write in the prison. He wrote this book in three days (28–30 January 1964) while he was imprisoned in Sundarijal jail. It was published in 1980 (2036 BS) by Sajha Prakashan.

It is a retelling of the Mahabharata epic from the point of view of a grocer's wife. While most retelling uses a primary or secondary character's viewpoint, Koirala told the story of how a war can affect an ordinary person too. It is one of his shortest novels.

== Synopsis ==
The novella is set in the aftermath of the Kurukshetra War. The death and destruction caused by the war was of astronomical amount. Many women lost their male relatives in the war. Modiaain is the story of such a woman who lost her husband in the war. Within the book, emotions like war, love, sexuality, beauty, longing, anger, morality, honesty, fear, bravery, deceit, renunciation, emptiness and indomitable aspirations are shown in Koirala's smooth prose.

The story begins with a boy travelling from Nepal to India with a guy called Misirji. The boy is very keen to explore the city of Darbhanga. There the two stay in a house of Modiaain. They bathe in the Hadaha Pokhari (Hadaha lake) near the house and have lunch then the boy explores the city during the day with Misirji. The boy wishes to visit the Hadaha Pokhari but Modiaain stops him since it is night-time. Modiaain tells him that the lake has been there since the Mahabharata time. She then narrates the story of the Mahabharata to the boy.

== See also ==
- Sumnima
- Narendra Dai
- Atmabrittanta
