= Subash Gajurel =

Nepalese film director

Subash Gajurel (Nepali: सुवास गजुरेल) is a film director from Nepal. His film Basain was Nepal's Official Entry in 2006 for the 79th Academy Awards in the foreign-language film category.

== Filmography ==
- Maya Baiguni - 2001
- Basain - 2005
