= Parijat (writer) =

Nepalese writer and poet

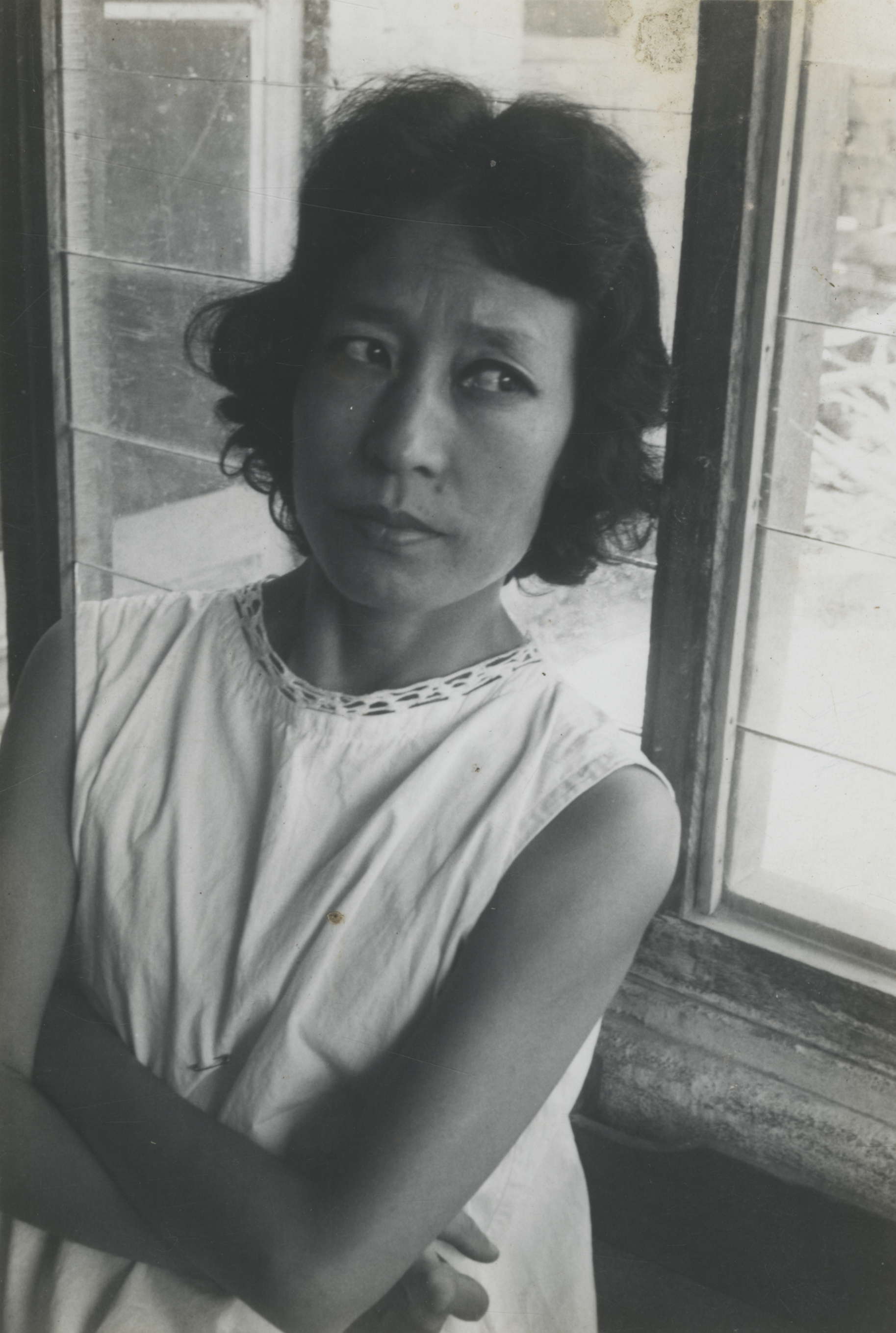
- Born: Bishnu Kumari Waiba; 16 September 1937; Darjeeling, India
- Died: 4 December 1993 (aged 56); Kathmandu, Nepal
- Education: Padma Kanya Multiple Campus
- Occupation: Writer
- Notable work: Shirishko Phool
- Awards: Madan Puraskar

Bishnu Kumari Waiba, widely known as Parijat, was a writer and poet of Nepali language. She is best known for her novel Shirishko Phool, for which she won the Madan Puraskar, becoming the first woman to receive the award. She published multiple novels and wrote many poems and stories in her lifetime.

== Early life and education ==
Bishnu Kumari Waiba, Parijat was born in 1937 (Nepali 1990 BS ) in the hill station of Darjeeling, India, a place known for its tea gardens. Her mother, Amrita Moktan, died when Parijat was very young, and she was raised by her father and her grandparents. Her father, Dr. K.N. Waiba, was a physician.

The birthplace of Parijat, Darjeeling, is a major centre of Nepali language, culture and literature. Darjeeling is inhabited by Nepali peoples who also speak the same language and have a similar culture as that of Nepalis. Parijat was intricately connected to Nepal and Nepali literature from her early childhood. She had a keen interest in literature from her childhood.

Parijat completed part of her schooling in Darjeeling and moved and then settled in Kathmandu, Nepal in 1954. She completed her schooling at Padma Kanya Campus and received Bachelor of Arts (BA) degree. She became paralyzed at the age of 26. Her sister looked after her for the majority of her life.

== Career ==
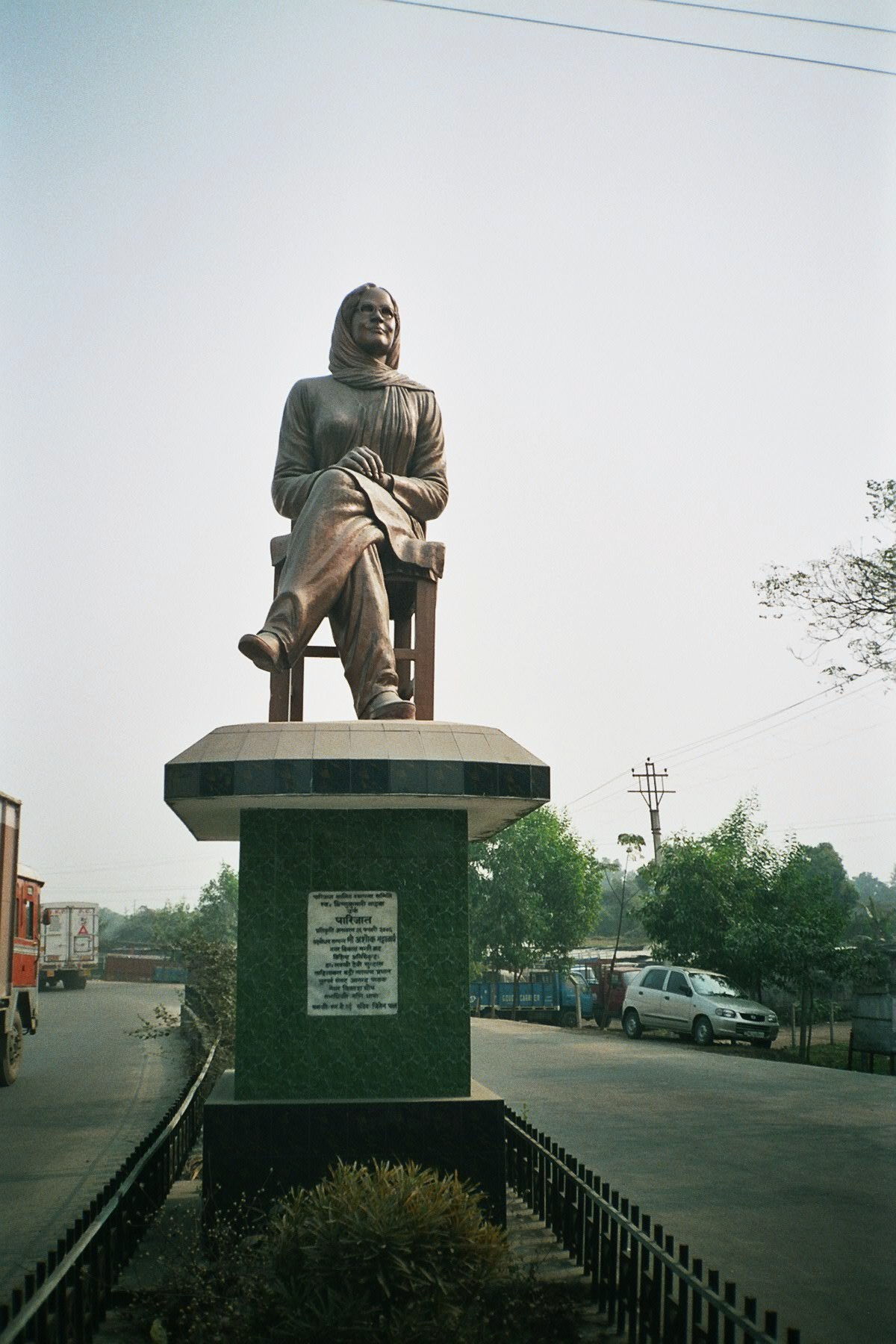
A statue of Parijat in Siliguri, West Bengal, India.

In 1959, Parijat's first poem was published by Dharti. She published three poetry collections: Akansha, Parijat Ka Kavita and Baisalu Bartaman. Her first short story was Maile Najanmayeko Chhoro. She is, however, best known in Nepal as a novelist. Altogether, she wrote ten novels, of which Shirish Ko Phool gained the greatest popularity. In 1965, she was awarded with the Madan Puraskar for the novel. She also received the Sarwashrestha Pandulipi Puraskar, Gandaki Basunahara Puraskar, and Bridabrit. Shirish Ko Phool is one of the most important piece of work in the whole of Nepali literature. She was awarded Madan Prize of 2022 B.S. for this novel. The English translation of Shiris ko Phool, The Blue Mimosa has been adopted in the literature curriculum of the University of Maryland.

She began her literary career with "Dharti" while she was studying in Kathmandu. Besides being a writer of novels, stories, poems, articles etc., she also led the "Ralfa Movement" in 1966. She was elected as the member of the Tribhuwan University and was a part of Ralfa literature movement. She also played an important role in the establishment of Pragatisheel Lekhak Sangh and worked for Akhil Nepal Mahila Manch, Bandi Sahayata Niyog and Nepal Manav Adhikar Sangathan.

Parijat remained unmarried. She continued to experience physical setbacks. While she was contributing to literature, she also tried to support social causes and initiated attempts like the Prisoners' Assistance Mission. She died in 1993.

== Bengali Hungryalist Movement and Parijat ==
Several Bengali poets and painters of the Hungry generation movement had stayed in Kathmandu for a few months during the 1960s decade and had been able to exchange indomitable spirits of each other. Parijat's Akansha is a testimony to that spirit. The notable Hungryalist poets and painters who visited Parijat quite frequently were Malay Roy Choudhury, Subimal Basak, Anil Karanjai and Samir Roychoudhury. A collection of Nepali and Hungryalist writings was edited by Samir Roychoudhury.

== Bibliography ==
Category	Title	Year Published
Novels	Shirishko Phool	1964
Novels	Mahattahin	1968
Novels	Paribhasit Aankhaharu	1989
Novels	Baishko Manche	
Novels	Toribari, Bata Ra Sapanaharu	
Novels	Antarmukhi	
Novels	Usle Rojeko Bato	
Novels	Parkhal Bhitra Ra Bahira	
Novels	Anido Pahadsangai	1982
Short stories	Maile Najanmayeko Chhoro	
Short story collections	Aadim Desh	
Short story collections	Sadak Ra Pratibha	
Short story collections	Salgiko Balatkrit Aashu	
Short story collections	Badhsala Jadaa Aunda	
Poem collections	Akanksha	
Poem collections	Parijat Ka Kabita	
Poem collections	Baishalu Bartaman	
Memoir essays	Dhupi Salla Ra Laliguransko Fedma	
Memoir essays	Auta Chitramaya Shuruwat	
Memoir essays	Aadhyayan Ra Sangharsha	

== See also ==
- Banira Giri
- Bhupi Sherchan
- Shankar Lamichhane
