= Narayan Bhakta Shrestha =

Nepalese singer

Narayan Bhakta Shrestha (Nepali:नारायण भक्त्त श्रेष्ठ), popularly known by the name of Rayan, is a progressive songwriter and singer of Nepal. He was one of four members of musical group Ralpha.

== Biography ==
Shrestha was born in Okhaldhunga district in a Newar family. He had a musical influence from his father who was an active proponent of Newar culture such as festivals, language and music. In childhood, Shrestha played in traditional theatre. At the age of 19, he was selected as a singer in Radio Nepal to sing folk songs. He worked there for four years. After sensing corruption in the organization, he left Radio Nepal and formed the musical group Ralpha in the leadership of Parijat in 2019 BS. He was involved in writing and singing protest songs during the Panchayat era. His songs were later used by Maoist during the civil war.

He has also served as a president of Nepal Academy of Music and Drama.

== Popular songs ==
- Gaun Gaun Bata Utha
- Ek jugma ek din

== Publication ==
- Sima geet, 2072BS
