= Akanksha =

Akanksha, Aakanksha, Aakaankshaa, Akansha or Aakansha is a female given name of Sanskrit origin, meaning "desire" or "anticipation". It has a spiritual context relating to aspiration and ambition. It is more related to need and not want.

Notable people with the name include:

- Akanksha Juneja (born 1990), Indian actress
- Akanksha Puri (born 1988), Indian model and actress
- Akanksha Sahai (born 1988), Indian athlete
- Akansha Sareen, Indian model and actress
- Akanksha Singh (born 1989), Indian basketball player
- Aakanksha Singh (born 1990), Indian actress
- Akamksha Ranil (born 2004), Indian
