= Lil Bahadur Chettri =

Indian writer in the Nepali language (1933–2025)

- लील बहादुर क्षेत्री
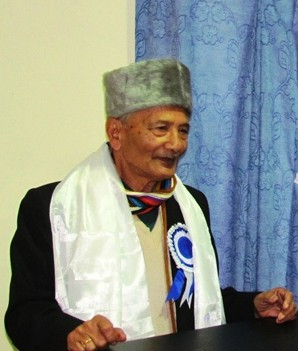
- Born: 1 March 1933; Guwahati, Assam Province, British India
- Died: 13 March 2025 (aged 92)
- Education: Guwahati University
- Occupations: Novelist; Short story writer; Essayist; Literary critic
- Writing career
- Language: Nepali, English
- Notable works: Basain, Brahmaputraka ChheuChhau
- Notable awards: Sahitya Akademi Award, 1987; Jagadamba Shree Purasakar, 2016; Padmashri, 2020

Lil Bahadur Chettri (Nepali: लील बहादुर क्षेत्री, 1 March 1933 – 13 March 2025) was an Indian writer in the Nepali language from Assam, who was a recipient of Sahitya Academy Award for his book Brahmaputrako Chheu Chhau. His other book Basain is a story of poor villagers who undergo suffering due to the exploitation of the feudal and so-called upper class of the society. It is included in the curriculum of Tribhuvan University, Nepal. In 2016, he was honoured with Jagadamba Shree Purasakar for his contribution to the Nepali literature and language. In 2020, the Government of India awarded him the Padmashri, the fourth highest civilian award of India for his contribution in literature and education.

Chettri died on 13 March 2025, at the age of 92.

== Works ==
=== Novels ===
- Basain (1957)
- Brahmaputraka ChheuChhau (1986)
- Atripta (1969)

=== Essays ===
- Assam Ma Nepali Bhasako Sharogharo (Difficulties of Nepali Language in Assam)

=== Plays ===
- Dobato (Crossroads)

=== Short stories collection ===
- Tindasak Bis Abhibyakti (Twenty Expressions In Three Decades)
- Lil Bahadur Chettri ka Kathaharu

== See also ==
- Nepali literature
- List of Sahitya Akademi Award winners for Nepali
- Peter J. Karthak
- Indra Bahadur Rai
