= Ghamka Pailaharu =

Nepalese novel by Dha. Cha. Gotame

- Cover page of the novel
- Author: Dha. Cha. Gotame
- Original title: घामका पाइलाहरू
- Language: Nepali
- Genre: Novel
- Publisher: Sajha Prakashan
- Publication date: 1979
- Publication place: Nepal
- Pages: 268
- Awards: Madan Puraskar (2035 BS)

Ghamka Pailaharu (Nepali: घामका पाइलाहरू) is a 1979 Nepali novel by Dha. Cha. Gotame. The novel depicts the day–to–day life of a nameless town in Tarai region of Nepal, loosely based on Birgunj. Gotame grew up in Birgunj and used the town as the novel's setting. The newly settled town is situated in southern part of central region of Nepal, beside a railway station of the first Nepalese railway (now defunct Nepal Government Railway).

It was originally published in 1979 (2035 BS) by the Sajha Prakashan and won the Madan Puraskar for the same year. The sequel of the novel Yaha Dekhi Tyaha Samma was published in 1984 (2040 BS).

== Synopsis ==
Pawan, a school going child is the main narrator of the novel. Pawan, his father Pitamber, grandfather Durganath and his mother live in a modest house in a nameless town in Tarai region of Nepal, near the Indian border. Pitamber works for a local trader, Pawan's mother is a housewife and Durganath is a retired Pandit. Beside school, Pawan spends most of his time with his grandfather, listening to his stories and roaming around the village.

His father is a strict but hardworking man with a modest income. Pitamber is not satisfied with his life in the town and wants to go back to his ancestral village bit is unable to do so because of his father's ailing health. Since, there are no hospitals in his ancestral village, he is forced to stay in the town. Durganath, being a Pandit, is a respected figure in the town. He is also friend with the manager of the station, Amalendu Bhattacharya.

Amalendu Bhattacharya is a Bengali mechanical engineer and widower who lives in the town with his daughter Aṇu. Meanwhile, Pitamber, in his free time spends time with the staffs of the station at their quarter. The staff includes Srivastava, a doctor, etc. Ganeshi, a paan–seller is also one of the Pitamber's friends. Ganeshi has a colorful personality and is loved by his friends. Initially, Amalendu Bhattacharya hates Ganeshi for selling paan in the station without any permission but later starts to like him after Ganeshi helps Bhattacharya when he gets unwell.

Pawan performs very well in his studies and because of which Bhattacharjee hires Pawan as Aṇu's tutor. Over the course of tutoring, Pawan and Aṇu becomes friends. The novel portrays the friendship and fellowship, as well as the disagreements between the townspeople, the growing pains of Pawan as well as the socioeconomic condition of working-class people of the Tarai region of Nepal. Using these characters, Gotame depicts the activities of a railway–station–town and the role the train plays in the life of its residents.

== Awards ==
The book won the Madan Puraskar as well as Sajha Puraskar, for the year 2035 BS (1979). Although, Gotame wrote lots of books, Ghamka Pailaharu and its sequel Yaha Dekhi Tyaha Samma were the only two novels he wrote.

== See also ==
- Alikhit
- Sumnima
