= Akanksha Sahai =

Indian Vovinam martial artist (born 1988)

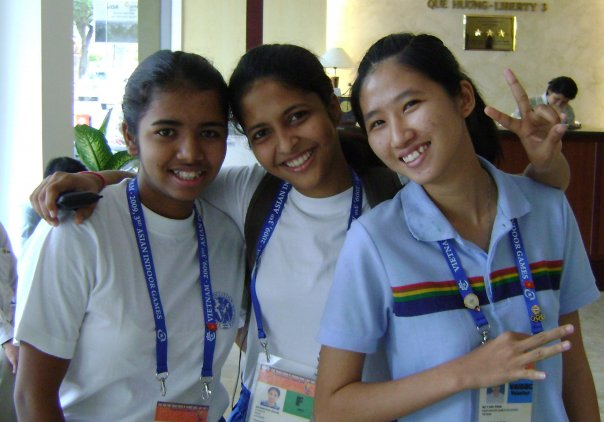
- From left to right: Pratiksha Santosh Shinde, Akanksha and a Vietnamese volunteer

Personal information
- Full name: Akanksha Sahai
- Born: 28 October 1988 (age 37) India
- Height: 160 cm (5 ft 3 in)
- Weight: 54 kg (119 lb)
Medal record
Representing India
Vovinam
World Vovinam Championship
Bronze medal – third place	2009 Ho Chi Minh City	TBA
Asian Indoor Games
Silver medal – second place	2009 Hanoi	Double

Akanksha Sahai (born 28 October 1988) is an Indian athlete that is chosen to compete in the 2009 Asian Indoor Games and the first World Vovinam Championship. In the dual sword form event of the Indoor Games, Pratiksha Santosh Shinde and Akanksha Sahai got India a silver medal. It's also Pratiksha's third silver coming in fights category.

In the World Vovinam Championship, she is ranked number 3.

== Early life ==
Akanksha is a student at University of Delhi, who majors in Commerce and a Masters from Lancaster University in International Business. Together with her father, Vishnu Sahai, who is a doctor and a peer, she makes vovinam popular in the whole India. She helps him a lot to communicate with people, organise and acts as an athlete. Among the Indian athletes, she is the only one that is considered to be able to serve as a judge.
