= Greta Rana =

British writer

Greta Rana MBE
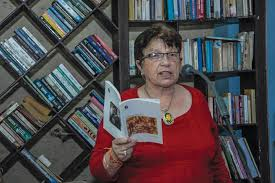
- Born: 1943 (age 82–83); Castleford, West Riding of Yorkshire
- Education: Victoria University of Manchester
- Occupations: Poet, writer

Greta Rana, MBE (7 February 1943 – 25 January 2023), was a writer and poet born in Yorkshire, U.K. She lived in Nepal for over half a century. She was awarded Order of the British Empire in 2005.

Working in mountain areas in Nepal during her first two decades in the country led her to accept the task of establishing a publishing and PR unit for the International Centre for Integrated Mountain Development (ICIMOD), an intergovernmental organisation which operates at the interface of research and development in the eight countries of the Hindu Kush-Himalayas in 1989. She continued to build on this unit, now a sizeable programme, until her retirement at the end of 2004.

In 1991 Greta Rana was joint winner of the Arnsberger Internationale Kurzprosa and in that year she delivered a paper at the International PEN Congress in Vienna on 'Mondialism: The Future Looking at the Past,' which outlines the unchangeability of human nature across cultures and continents based on three recurring themes from the Iliad and the Mahabharat;viz.,'War is futile' but war is inevitable, and it is the duty of the warrior to fight. Against such human destructiveness, the future lies not in the call to conform as in the call to "When in Rome do as the Romans do," but in a human capacity to tolerate and celebrate difference and the whole kaleidoscope of human cultures and creativity.

A committed interest in children's education, especially children whose families cannot afford to send them to school, led to the founding of the 'New Shakespeare Wallahs' an amateur drama group working under the auspices of the Nepal Britain Society to raise money for children's education amongst the poorest communities. Brief periods of residence in Laos and Afghanistan in the late 70s and early 80s, besides her time in Nepal, have given her a unique outlook on what the author refers to as "the colonisation by development aid."

== Early life and education ==
Born in 1943 in the coal-mining town of Castleford, West Riding of Yorkshire (birthplace of the famous sculptor Henry Moore), Greta Rana attended the local Grammar school and then went on to graduate from the Victoria University of Manchester. During this period she came into contact with the 'Manchester Poets', 'Stand' and Jon Silkin when she was editor of the University CND's journal 'Fallout.' In 1966 she lost contact with her poetic roots when she married and went to Canada. She spoke several languages including English, Nepali, French & Latin and understood a few more.

== Literary career in Nepal ==
In 1971 she arrived in Nepal with two of her sons: her youngest son was born in Nepal the following year and from then on she began once more to write poetry. She has always referred to poetry as her 'highest excellence,' but in the early 70s she was commissioned to write three novellas with a Nepali background for the International Bookfair in New Delhi. These were titled Nothing Greener, Distant Hills, and Right As It Is.

The first is a teenage novel about a village girl who escapes an arranged marriage as a co-wife to a much older couple. Providing them with the son they crave her life is made so miserable she runs away. The bulk of the novel deals with her work as a domestic in an American family working in development, her love affair with the son, and sudden demise just as her life is beginning to change for the better. Distant Hills is a 'housewife' novel( author's words) about an impoverished hill aristocrat who brings a secret to her marriage to a rich Kathmandu Rana. Widowed she suddenly becomes all powerful in a family sense and the unusual denouement deals with how she handles her 'secret' affairs in the twilight of her life. The final novel is a psychodrama set against the background of Nepal's ethnic animosities. A ritualistic wife murders her doctor husband at the 'command' of her tutelary goddess who instructs her that he is 'unclean' because of his previous and resumed love affair with a higher caste woman. The novel builds up suspense as the obviously disturbed woman progresses from pregnancy to childbirth and post-partum depression and paranoia.

== Guests in This Country ==
Guests in This Country is set in an imaginary country - Lapalisthan. Basically this is a catchall name for the three developing countries the author has lived and worked in: Laos, Nepal, and Afghanistan. It is a satire about a young programme officer who sets out to be an interpreter but ends up as a Junior Programme Officer for the United World Institution for the Loaning of Technology and Resources Internationally(UWILTRI). From her landing at the airport in Lapalisthan, the protagonist, Becky Sidebottom, gets into hair-raising situation after situation because of the impish but gazelle-like presence of Desi Khunbarrah, a scion of the old aristocracy, who opens Becky's eyes to the 'colonisation' of development aid and the hypocrisy of many of its protagonists. A sequel to this satire, 'Ghosts in the Bamboo,' will soon be available.

== A Place beneath the Pipal Tree ==
A Place beneath the Pipal Tree is about three generations of Sherpa women and their relationship with their own people, the monastic order in a famous monastery, and the ruling elite of Nepal. Of all her novels this one tells the story of a world that is now fast vanishing, of a time of hope in Nepal, and the fear of disintegration and things falling apart. By the time we move on to 'Hostage', things have already fallen apart in Nepal and the poor are exploited as labourers in the Gulf States. This novel deals with Hari Prasad, a humble river boatman, who sells his labour through the auspices of a corrupt brother-in-law who is a politician in Kathmandu. Hari Prasad is eventually murdered and the denouement of this story deals with an essentially corrupt society where parties tout political ideals to which they do not adhere and the majority have to cope in whatever way they can.

== Hidden Women ==
Hidden Women released in May 2012 by Roli Books, India, is the historical novel about the wives and concubines of Jung Bahadur Kunwar Rana the founder of the Rana dynasty. It is a novel look at his story, worn out by many Nepali writers, because it is told through the eyes of the women in his life; and starts with his wet nurse. Very little is known about the lives of Nepali women but the author has used research for a doctorate undertaken many years previously to build together a feasible picture of how women lived and thought, hoped and died in a restrictive feudal environment.

Poetic works by this author deal with a range of issues, from personal angst, joy, nature-its beauty and human abuse of the same- and the sorrowful aspects of refugees, racism, torture, and the hollowness of human loss.

== Notable works ==
=== Poetry ===
- Mara
- The Stone God Thunders
- Middle Load
- Beneath the Jacaranda,
- Hunger is Home
- Nothing Personal
- So Why Not Sleep
- From Castleford to Kathmandu (Winner of the poetry book of the year 2021 at the Kalinga Literary Festival, India)

=== Novels ===
- Nothing Greener
- Distant Hills
- Right As It Is
- Guests in This Country
- Place Beneath The Pipal Tree (also in German as Im Schatten des heiligen Baumes)
- Hidden Women (India Ink, Roli Books, India)
- Hostage (Speaking Tiger, India)
- Ghosts in the Bamboo (Book Hill Publications, Nepal)

=== Others ===
- Mount Everest
- Monsoon Heat Wave

== Other information ==
Besides these she has numerous journalistic contributions and short bodies of work. Her work has also been translated into other languages. She also translated the popular Nepalese historical novel Seto Bagh by Diamond Shumshere Rana into English and gave it the title 'Wake of the White Tiger'. Since then it has been translated into several other languages. She has received several awards for her writing. She is the aunt of well known Castleford personality Kathryn Jones.

She was one of the founders of the PEN Centre in Nepal in 1987 and has recently become a member of the PEN centre of San Miguel de Allende where she has many friends. She has also been directing plays to raise money for the Nepal Britain Society for social causes under the production name of New Shakespearewallahs for the past decade or so. From 1984 to 1986 she was Chair of The International PEN Women Writers' Committee, representing women writers at the Fourth World Conference on Women in Beijing in 1995 where a motion was tabled about internal repression of women through 'cultural' mores and the self-censorship this imposed.
