= Antarmukhi =

1964 Nepali novel by Parijat

- Author: Parijat
- Original title: अन्तर्मुखी
- Language: Nepali
- Genre: Novel
- Publisher: Sajha Prakashan
- Publication place: Nepal
- Media type: Print (Paperback)

Antarmukhi (English: Introvert, Nepali: अन्तर्मुखी) is a Nepali language novel by Parijat.

== See also ==
- Shirishko Phool
- Mahattahin
- Paribhasit Aankhaharu
- Toribari, Bata Ra Sapanaharu
