= Jhola =

Nepali movie about Sati Pratha

- Theatrical Release Poster
- Jhola
- Directed by: Yadav Kumar Bhattarai
- Written by: Krishna Dharabasi
- Based on: Jhola
- Produced by: Malati Shah, Ram Gopal Thapa, Raj Timalsina & Shusil Shah
- Starring: Garima Panta, Desh Bhakta Khanal, Sujal Nepal, Laxmi Giri & Deepak Chhetri
- Cinematography: Deepak Bajracharya
- Release date: 7 December 2013
- Running time: 90 minutes
- Country: Nepal
- Language: Nepali

Jhola (Nepali: झोला) is a 2013 Nepali film based on a story by writer Krishna Dharabasi. It is about Sati culture that was prevalent in the Nepalese society until the 1920s in which wife had to immolate herself upon her husband's death, typically on his funeral pyre. For her role, actress Garima Panta won Best Actress award at SAARC Film Festival held in Sri Lanka, 2014. The film was selected as the Nepali entry for the Best Foreign Language Film at the 87th Academy Awards, but was not nominated.

== Sati custom ==
Sati custom is an ancient practice of burning a widow on her deceased husband's funeral pyre or burning her alive in his grave. According to Hindu Scriptures, the custom of Sati was a voluntary practice in which a woman voluntarily decides to end her life with her husband after his death. But later the practice was abused and women were forced to commit Sati or were even dragged against their wish and put into the burning pyres. Historical accounts show that several Royal and common women were burnt alive through this practice. In BS 1977 Ashad 25 (1920 AD), Chandra Shumsher J.B.R. officially abolished the Sati system from Nepal.

== Plot ==
Kanchi (Garima Panta) is a young woman who was married to an old husband who is 40 years elder than Kanchi. At present, Kanchi's husband is ill because of his old age and finally dies. Now, as per the social rules and regulation, Kanchi had to go to Sati where she should burn herself with her husband's deceased body. But, fate is on her side and she manages to survive. She starts to live in the cave of a nearby jungle. Ghanashyam, being lonely in the absence of his loving mother, visits the jungle and finds his mother hiding in the cave. Kanchi unites with her son but they are unable to stay in the same society because the society people would kill the women even though they have survived Sati in any means. Ghanashyam makes a plan of leaving the village and getting settled in another place so that they could make a new beginning. He asks his mother to stay in the jungle and goes home to bring their belongings.Then he went to house and told his aunt everything that happened in jungle and asked her to give some food and clothes for his mother. Later, Kanchi's brother-in-law and his wife join and assist them to leave the village. As Kanchi with Ghanashyam are going to leave the village, they witness a woman, who is to be Sati but couldn't do so and runs away, being killed by the people of the funeral.

== Cast ==
- Garima Panta as Kanchi
- Sujal Nepal as Ghanashyam (Kanchi's son)
- Deepak Chhetri as Kanchi's old husband
- Desh Bhakta Khanal as Kanchi's brother-in-law (Dewar)
- Laxmi Giri as Kanchi's sister-in-law (Deurani)
- Krishna Dharabasi (Himself - Special Appearance)

== See also ==
- List of submissions to the 87th Academy Awards for Best Foreign Language Film
- List of Nepalese submissions for the Academy Award for Best Foreign Language Film
