= Radha (novel) =

2005 novel by Krishna Dharabasi

- Radha by Krishna Dharabasi
- Author: Krishna Dharabasi
- Original title: राधा
- Language: Nepali
- Genre: Novel
- Published: 2005
- Publisher: Pairavi Book House
- Publication place: Nepal
- Media type: Print (Paperback)
- Awards: Madan Puraskar, 2005
- ISBN: 9789937541275

Radha (Nepali: राधा) is a 2005 novel written by Krishna Dharabasi, winner of prestigious Nepali literary award Madan Puraskar. The novel was an adaptation of the ancient Sanskrit epic Mahabharat, giving greater prominence to the character of Radha. Inspired by Jacques Derrida's Theory of Deconstruction, Dharabasi completely changed the characters of Radha and Krishna, making Radha brave, dignified and revolutionary.

== Synopsis ==
The plot of Radha reflects the situation in Nepal at the time of its publication, especially the Nepalese Civil War.

Radha is an example of “Lila Lekhan”, a Nepalese metaphysical novel concerned with explaining the features of reality that exist beyond the physical world and our immediate senses, for which Dharabasi is known.

== Translation ==
The book is translated into English as Radha: Love, War, and Renunciation by Mahesh Paudyal.

== Reception ==
The book won the prestigious Madan Puraskar for the year 2062 BS (2005).

== See also ==
- Palpasa Café
- Maharani
- Ghamka Pailaharu
