= Gaun Gaun Bata Utha =

1978 song by Ramesh and Rayan

Song by Raamesh and Rayan
- Language: Nepali
- English title: Rise, Rise from the Village
- Written: 1978
- Released: 1978
- Genre: Revolutionary
- Lyricist: Shyam Tamot

Gaun Gaun Bata Utha (Nepali: गाउँगाउँबाट उठ, lit. 'Rise Up from Every Village') is a Nepali-language revolutionary song by music duo Raamesh and Rayan and written and composed by Shyam Tamot. The song is also known as Sankalpa (resolution/ vow) song. The song has been translated into 17 national and foreign languages including Chinese, French and Hindi. The song served as an anthem during the 1979 Nepalese student protests as well as many other protests in Nepal.

== Background ==
In 1978, Shyam Tamot composed "Gaun Gaun Bata Utha" with vocals by musical duo Ramesh and Rayan.

== Lyrics ==
IAST

Gaun Gaun Bata Utha, Basti Basti Bata Utha
Gaun Gaun Bata Utha, Basti Basti Bata Utha
Yo desh ko muhar ferna lai utha
Yo desh ko muhar ferna lai utha (x2)

Hatama kalam hune haru, kalam liyera utha
Baaja bajauna janne haru, Baaja liyera utha
Hatama kalam hune haru, kalam liyera utha
Baaja bajauna janne haru, Baaja liyera utha

Gaun Gaun Bata Utha, Basti Basti Bata Utha
Gaun Gaun Bata Utha, Basti Basti Bata Utha
Yo desh ko muhar ferna lai utha
Yo desh ko muhar ferna lai utha

Hatama aujaar hune haru, aujaar liyera utha
saathma kehi nahune haru, aawaaj liyera utha
Hatama aujaar hune haru, aujaar liyera utha
saathma kehi nahune haru, aawaaj liyera utha

Gaun Gaun Bata Utha, Basti Basti Bata Utha
Gaun Gaun Bata Utha, Basti Basti Bata Utha
Yo desh ko muhar ferna lai utha
Yo desh ko muhar ferna lai utha (x2)

Translation

Rise up from every village, rise up from every settlement
Rise up from every village, rise up from every settlement
To change the face of the nation, rise up
To change the face of the nation, rise up. (x2)

The ones with a pen, rise up with your pen
The ones with a musical instrument, rise up with your instrument
The ones with a pen, rise up with your pen
The ones with a musical instrument, rise up with your instrument.

Rise up from every village, rise up from every settlement
Rise up from every village, rise up from every settlement
To change the face of the nation, rise up
To change the face of the nation, rise up.

The ones with a tool, rise up with your tool
The ones with nothing, rise up with your voice
The ones with a tool, rise up with your tool
The ones with nothing, rise up with your voice.

Rise up from every village, rise up from every settlement
Rise up from every village, rise up from every settlement
To change the face of the nation, rise up
To change the face of the nation, rise up. (x2)

== In popular culture ==
- The original song is featured prominently in Tulsi Ghimire's Balidaan (1997), historical drama film about a fictionalised version of the contemporary democracy movement.
- Nepali folk rock band Nepathya released a cover version of the song in 2018.
