= Khanal =

Khanal खनाल
- Pronunciation: /kʰʌˈnaːl/
- Language: Nepali, Sanskrit, Doteli

Origin
- Language: Khas Kura
- Origin: Nepal

Khanal (Nepali: खनाल) is a surname of Khas people of South Asia, primarily found among Hindu communities such as Hill-Brahmin and Khatri Chhetri of Nepal, and to a lesser extent in Myanmar and other South Asian countries such as India and Bhutan. The Khanal surname belongs to Ghrita Kaushik clan. Historically, the Khanals held roles as royal priests, scholars, and advisors, and were part of Thar Ghar, the group of families that assisted the rulers of the Gorkha Kingdom, as well as the Kingdom of Nepal.

== Notable people ==
- Brajesh Khanal (ne), Nepali actor
- Dev Khanal, Nepali cricketer
- Dipendra K. Khanal, Nepali film director
- Jhala Nath Khanal, Nepali politician, former Prime Minister of Nepal
- Kshetra Prasad Khanal, Nepali politician and social activist
- Rameshwor Khanal, Nepali politician, former Minister of Finance and Minister of Federal Affairs and General Administration
- Rewati Raman Khanal, Former Chief Secretary to late King Birendra of Nepal
- Yadunath Khanal, Nepali diplomat, former Foreign Secretary and Ambassador to the United States, China, and India
- Saroj Khanal, Nepali actor and director
- Sarbendra Khanal, 26th Chief of Nepal Police
- Shishir Khanal, Nepali politician, Minister of Foreign Affairs since 27 March 2026
