= Taranath Sharma =

Nepalese writer (1934–2022)

Dr. Taranath Sharma
- तारानाथ शर्मा
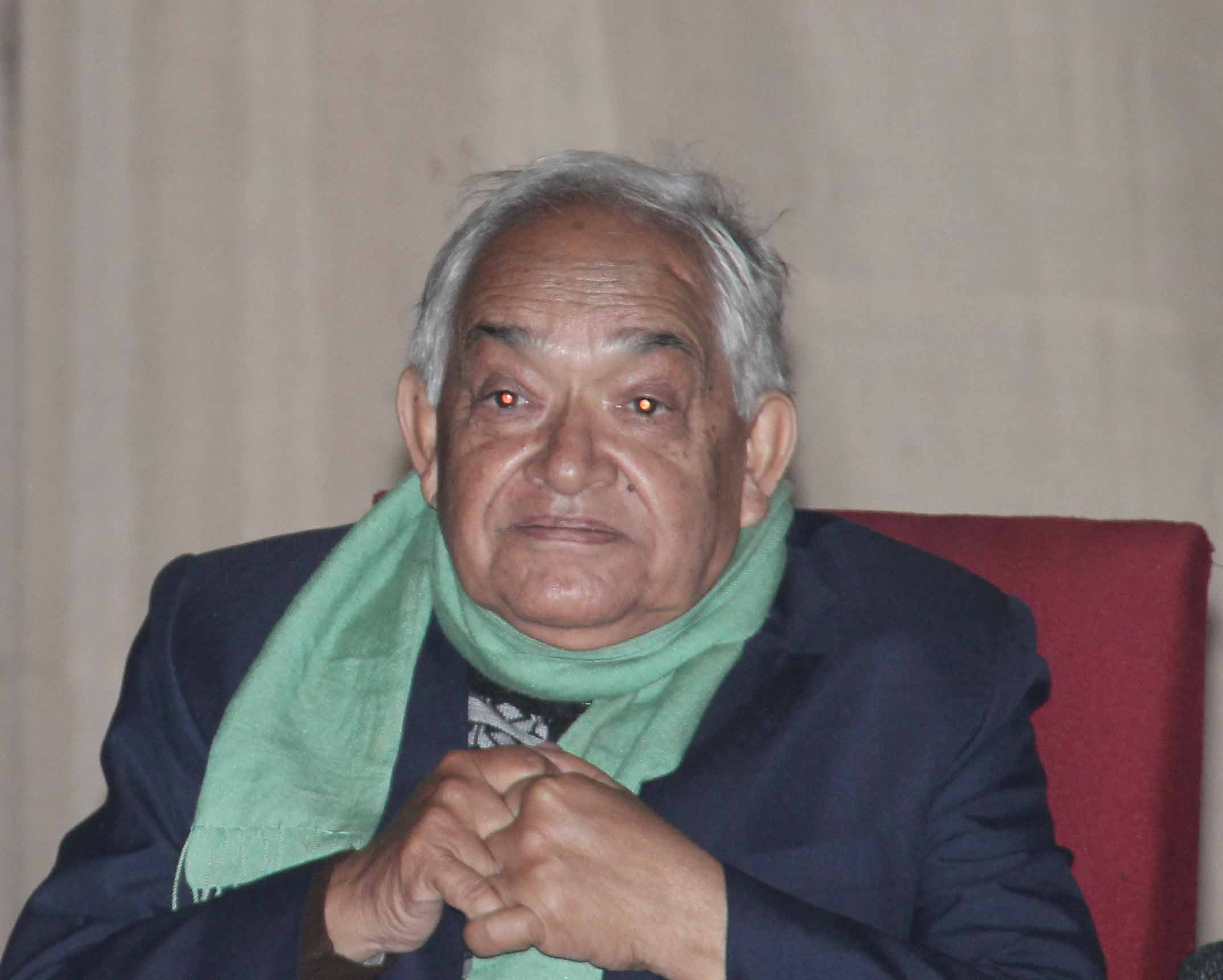
- Sharma
- Born: 23 June 1934; Barbote, Ilam, Nepal
- Died: 15 February 2022 (aged 87); Kathmandu, Nepal
- Education: PhD Linguistics
- Alma mater: University of Wisconsin-Madison
- Occupation: Writer
- Parent(s): Prajapati Bhandarin (father); Devaki Bhandari (mother)
- Writing career
- Pen name: Tana Sarma
- Genres: Travelogue, criticism, prose
- Notable work: Belaet Tira Baralida
- Notable awards: Madan Puraskar, Sajha Puraskar
- Literary movement: Jharro Nepali

Taranath Sharma (Nepali: तारानाथ शर्मा) popular name Tana Sarma (23 June 1934 – 15 February 2022) was a litterateur of Nepal, recognized as travel writer, essayist and literary critic. Sharma authored over 112 books in Nepali language. He contributed to Nepali Literature for over five decades.

== Early life and education ==
Sharma was born on 23 June 1934 in Barbote Ilam as the first child of Mr. Prajapati Upadhyay a social reformer. Quitting the Sanskrit education he continued his studies in the English school that was established by his father. He completed his school level studies at St Joseph's, Darjeeling. Sharma got PhD in Linguistics from the University of Wisconsin-Madison in the US.

== Literary career ==
While studying for a BA in Banaras, Sharma initiated the 'Jharro Nepali' a literature movement with his friends. He wrote his first work, Ojhel Parda, in 1966 inside jail while he was imprisoned for criticizing late King Mahendra's poem.

His travelogue entitled Belaet Tira Baralida meaning Ramblings in and around Britain, which he wrote while he was doing his Post Graduate Diploma with English as second language in the University College of North Wales won the popular 'Madan Puraskar' award for the year 1969.

Sharma served as the editor in chief of The Rising Nepal English daily for some years after the restoration of democracy in Nepal. He even served at Nobel Academy Secondary School as the school principal for many years. He has great contribution in Nepali education and literature.

== Awards ==
Sharma received various awards like the Madan Puraskar Award 1969 for Belaet Tira Baralida travelogue, the Saajha Award 1972 for 'Sama Ra Samaka Kriti' critic, and the Aadi kabi Bhanubhakta award 2013.

== Personal life and death ==
Sharma was married and had two sons. He died at his home in Kathmandu on 15 February 2022, at the age of 87. He suffered from dementia, diabetes, high blood pressure and other heart problems prior to his death.

== Bibliography ==
- Belaet Tira Baralida (Nepali: बेलाइततिर बरालिँदा)
- Jharro Nepali

== See also ==
- Shankar Lamichhane
- Bairagi Kainla
- Bhairav Aryal
