= Krishna Dharabasi =

Nepalese writer (born 1960)

- कृष्ण धरावासी
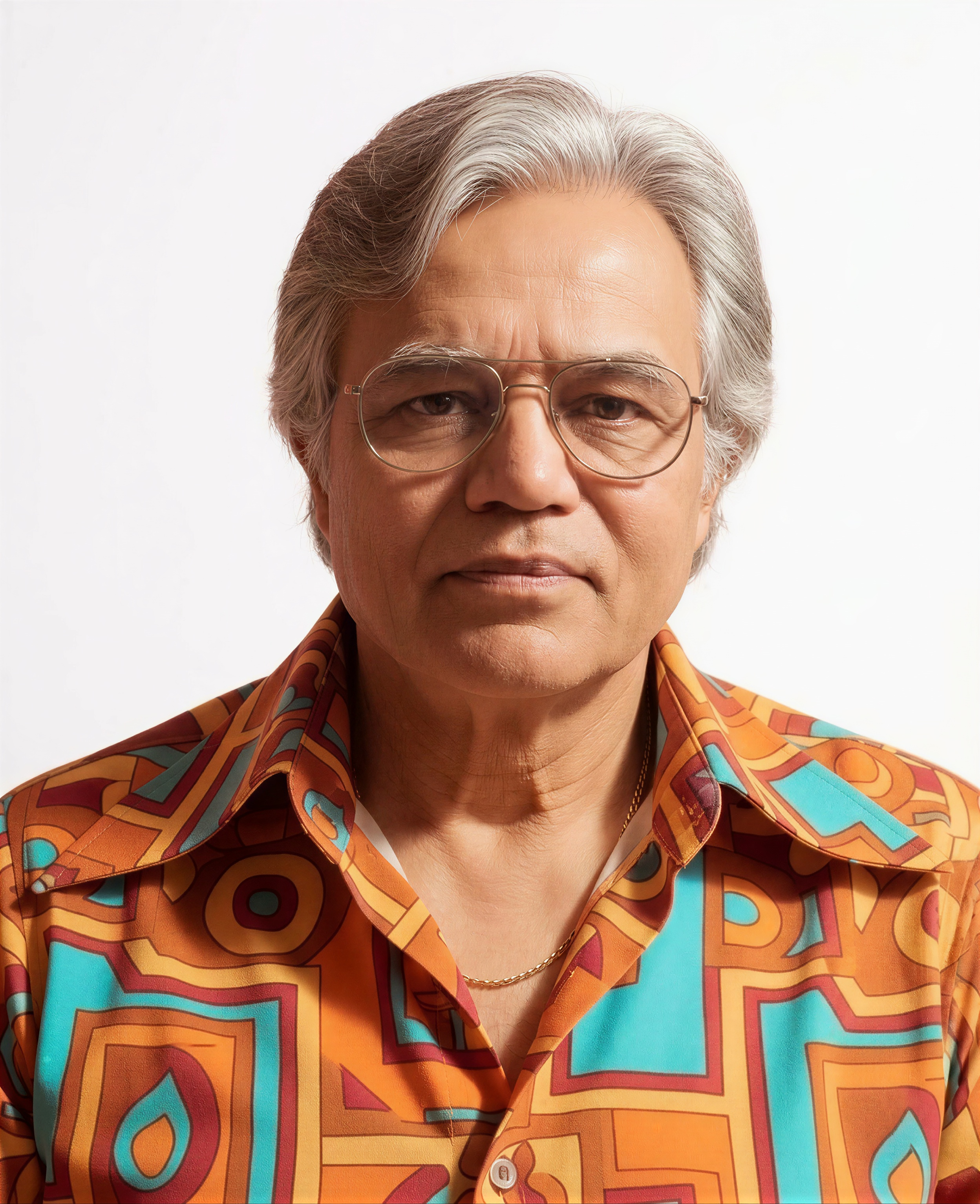
- Portrait of Krishna Dharabasi
- Born: Krishna Prasad Bhattarai; 17 July 1960 (age 65); Ambarpur, Panchthar
- Occupations: Writer and Novelist
- Notable work: Radha; Jhola
- Spouses: Sita Pokhrel (died 2010) Manju Bimali (m. 2012)
- Parents: Tikaram Bhattarai (father); Ambika Bhattarai (mother)
- Awards: Madan Puraskar, 2005

Krishna Prasad Bhattarai, professionally known as Krishna Dharabasi is a Nepali writer, novelist and literary critic. He has written multiple essays, short stories, poems and novels. He won the Madan Puraskar for his novel Radha in 2005 (2062 BS). Jhola, one of his short stories has been adapted into a film of the same title. He is known for using meta-writing style (Leela lekhan) in his fictional works.

== Biography ==
He was born on 17 July 1960 (2 Shrawan 2017 BS), to father Tikaram Bhattarai and mother Ambika Bhattarai in Ambarpur village of Panchthar district. He is the eldest child and has four sisters and a brother.

He began his literary career by publishing a poem in Suryodaya weekly newspaper. He worked in Agricultural Development Bank for 25 years. After retiring from his bank job, he dedicated his time for writing. Saranarthi, his debut novel was published in 1991.

== Bibliography ==
- Balak Harayeko Suchana (Essays collection,1991)
- Bishweshwar Prasad Koiralaka Upanyas (Literary criticism)
- Unmuktika Aawajharu (Poetry collection)
- Lilalekhan (Literary criticism)
- Nari Bhitra Testo K Chha Hajur (Essays collection)
- Uttam Jung Sijapatiko Aalu (Essays collection)
- Saranarthi (Novel, 1991)
- Adha Bato (Novel, 2002)
- Jhola (Short story collection, 2003)
- Pathakko Adalatma (Essay)
- Kaanchi Radha (Short epic, 2005)
- Radha (Novel, 2005)
- Tesro Aayam ra Bairagi Kainla (Literary criticism)
- Tapai (Essays collection)
- Mero Sahitik Yatra ra Madan Purskar (Memoir)
- Pandulipi (Novel)
- Tundal (Novel)
- Aama (Short story collection)
- Gestapo
- Lilabodh (Literary criticism)

== Personal life ==
His first wife Sita Pokharel died in 2010. He married Manju Bimali in 2012.

== See also ==
- Bairagi Kainla
- Madan Mani Dixit
- Ishwor Ballav
