= Pratiksha Santosh Shinde =

Athlete

Pratiksha Shinde
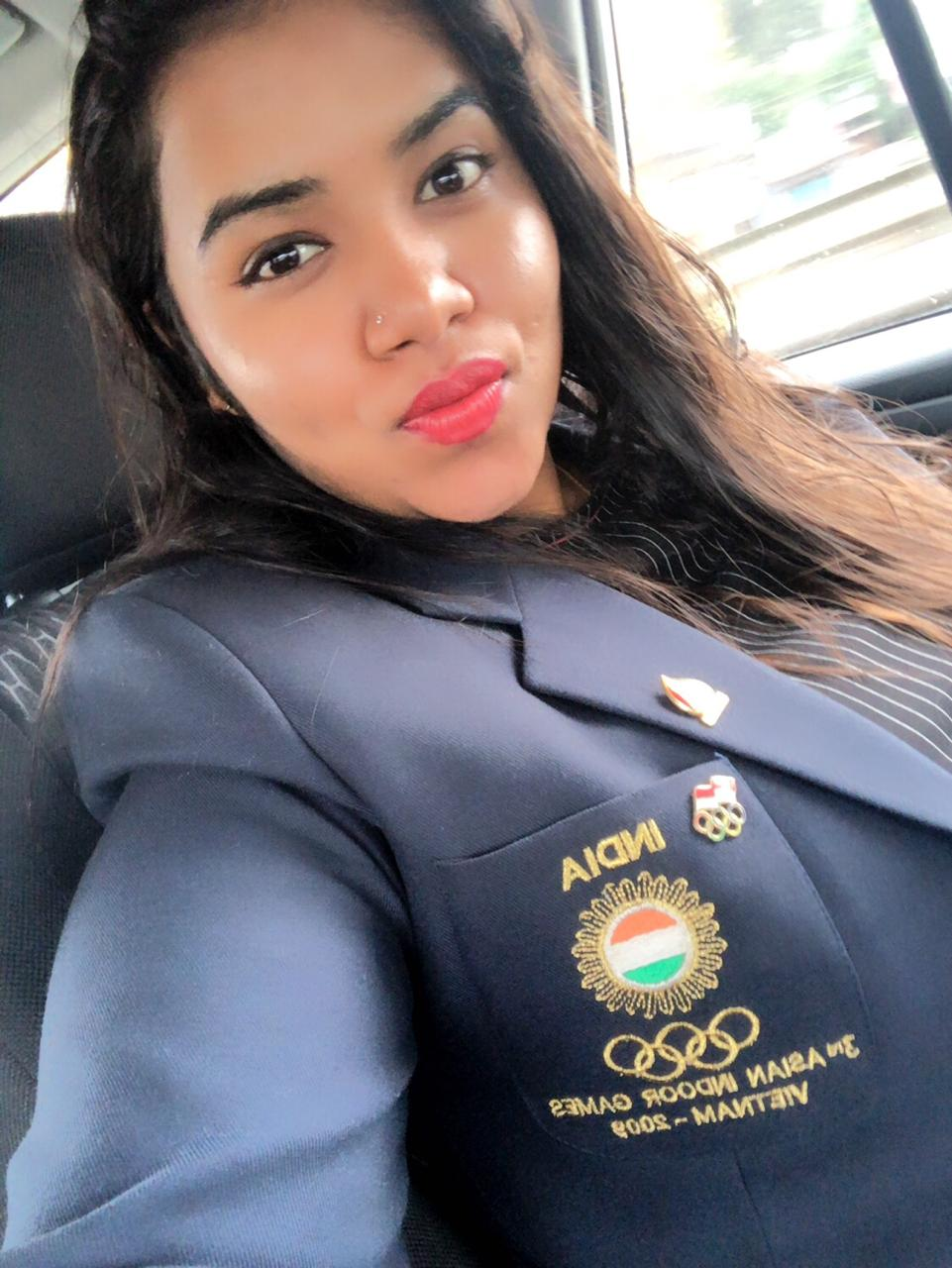

Personal information
- Full name: Pratiksha Santosh Shinde
- Nationality: India
- Born: May 2, 1994 (age 32)
- Height: 158 cm (5 ft 2 in)
- Weight: 56 kg (123 lb)
Medal record
Representing India
Wushu
The 4th World Traditional Wushu Championship
Silver medal – second place	2009 Ho Chi Minh City
Asian Indoor Games
Gold medal – first place	Single
Silver medal – second place	Single (Fight)
Silver medal – second place	3Men 1 Women
Vovinam
World Vovinam Championship
Bronze medal – third place	Single
Silver medal – second place	Double
Gold medal – first place	Single
Silver medal – second place	Single (Fight)
Silver medal – second place	3 Men 1 Women

Pratiksha Santosh Shinde (born May 2, 1994, Pune) is an Indian athlete that is chosen to compete in the 2009 Asian Indoor Games and the first World Vovinam Championship. In the dual sword form event of the Indoor Games, Shinde and Akanksha Sahai got India a silver medal. It's also Shinde's third silver coming in fights category. She also participated in the 4th World Traditional Wushu Championship in China Shiyan city 2010. In the World Vovinam Championship, she is ranked number 3.

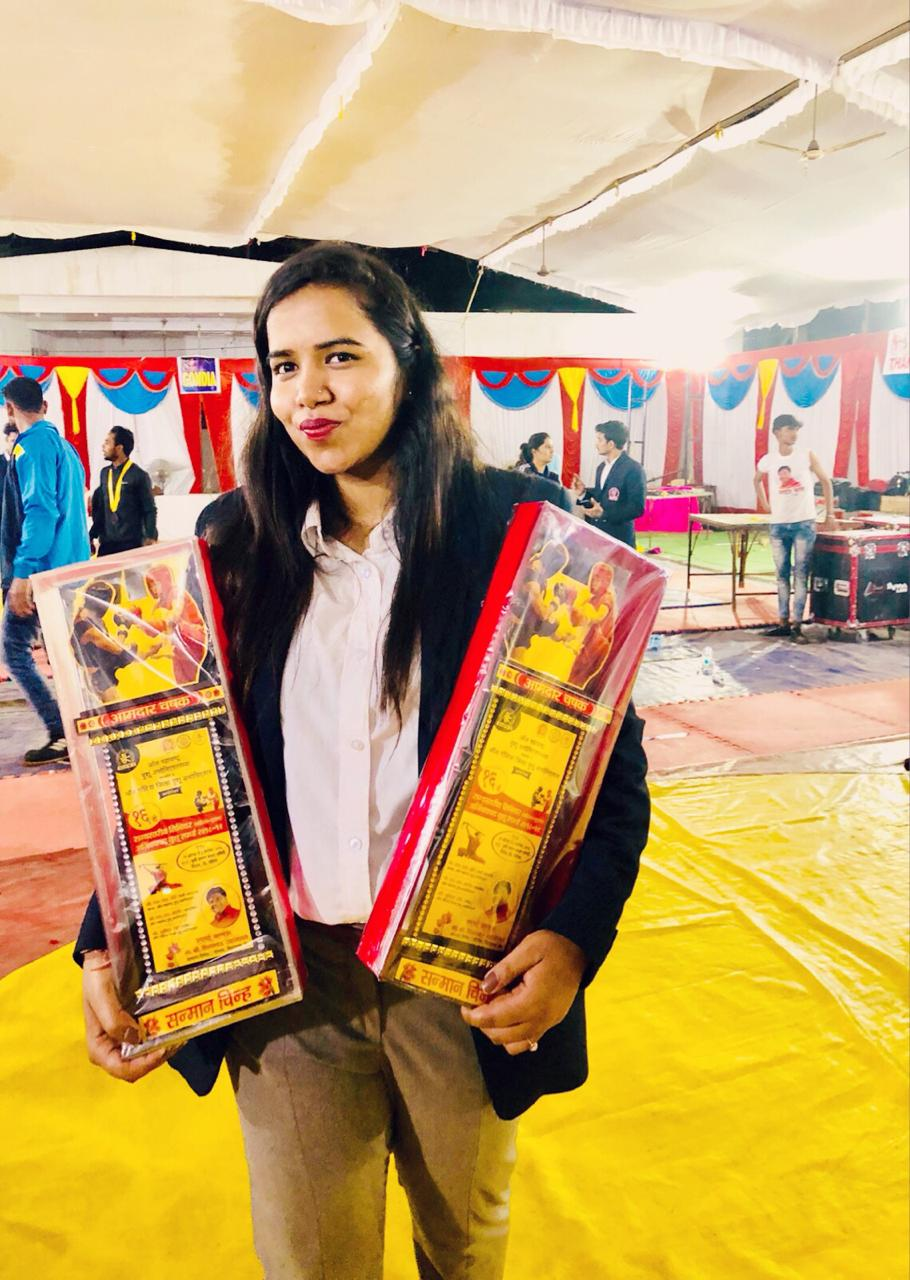
