= Teen Ghumti (film) =

- Official Poster
- Directed by: Babu Ram Dhakall
- Based on: Teen Ghumti by Bishweshwar Prasad Koirala
- Produced by: Rakesh Adukia; Pankaj Jalan; Babu Ram Dhakal
- Starring: Garima Panta; Dhruba Datta; Sushant Karki
- Cinematography: Rameshwor Karki
- Music by: Basanta Sapkota
- Distributed by: Mountain River Films
- Release date: 2016
- Running time: 2h 29m 22s
- Country: Nepal
- Language: Nepali

Teen Ghumti (Nepali: तीन घुम्ती) is a 2016 Nepali film directed by Babu Ram Dhakal, produced by Rakesh Adukia, Pankaj Jalan and Babu Ram Dhakal. The movie is based on the 1968 novel of the same name written by former Prime Minister of Nepal, BP Koirala.

== Synopsis ==
Indira, a girl from the ethnic group of Newars, falls in love with Pritambar, who is a Brahmin. She marries him, defying her parents.

Pritambar has strong morals but lacks any sense of romance. He is involved with a group of revolutionaries who are planning protests against the autocratic rule. This group regularly meets at Pritambar's house and the members get to know Indira.

When the security forces crack down on the revolutionary movement, Pritambar is imprisoned. Another member of the group, Roshan, comes to Indira's aid. He starts living with her and soon falls in love. Though she rejects his advances in the beginning, she eventually gives in. Their taboo relationship leads to Indira's pregnancy. With Pritambar due to be released, Indira is faced with a dilemma in her conservative society.

== Cast ==
- Garima Panta as Indira
- Dhruba Dutta as Pritambar
- Sushant Karki as Ramesh
