= Garima Panta =

Nepalese actress

- Born: Kamala pant Baradi, Aanbu Khaireni Rural Municipality, Tanahun
- Occupations: Actress, model
- Spouse: Hari Sharma Thapaliya

Garima Panta (Nepali: गरिमा पन्त) is a Nepalese actress and model known for her versatile role in movies and television. She started her career as a teenager by appearing in television commercials. She became widely known from the movie Jhola, which portrays the sati system in Nepal and led her to win several national and international awards.

Garima Panta married Hari Sharma Thapaliya in January 2016. After her marriage she not been active in the movie industry, as she has been living in Belgium with her husband. She said that she will be funding scholarships in several schools in her birthplace.

== Filmography ==
- Jhola
- Preeti Ko Phool
- Thuli
- Samjhana
- Teen Ghumti
- Arjun Dev
- Jiven mitru
- Man le Man lai Chuncha
- Sundar mero naam
- Phool
- Schout
- Bhai halcha ni
- Rang Baijani
- Dobato (special appearance)
- Sindoor (telefilm)
- Nikhil Dai
- Bhagya Vidhaata
- Parai
