= Raameshwor Shrestha =

Nepalese singer

Raameshwor Shrestha (Nepali:रामेश्वर श्रेष्ठ), popularly known by the name of Raamesh, is a progressive songwriter and singer of Nepal. He is most popular for his song Gaun Gaun Bata Utha.

== Biography ==
Shrestha was born in Palpa district. He was brought up in Doti and schooled in Sindhupalchok and Kathmandu. His singing career started in the early 1970s when he, Raayan, Manjul and Aarim came together to sing progressive songs. After 1990, the group drifted apart. During maoist movement in Nepal, the genere was titled Janabad.

A documentary has been made to depict his life. He also published his biography entitled Baalaapan Jeevanko (बालापन जीवनको).

== Popular songs ==
- Gaun Gaun Bata Utha
- Ek jugma ek din

== Awards and recognition ==
- Kalashree Awards in 2020-21
