= Alikhit =

1983 Nepali novel

- Author: Dhruba Chandra Gautam
- Original title: अलिखित
- Language: Nepali
- Genre: Fiction
- Publisher: Sajha Prakashan
- Publication date: 1983 (2040 B.S.)
- Publication place: Nepal
- Media type: Print (Paperback)
- Pages: 221
- Awards: Madan Puraskar 2040 B.S
- ISBN: 9789993329169

Alikhit (Nepali: अलिखित, lit. 'Unwritten') is a Nepali novel written by Dhruba Chandra Gautam. It was published in 1983 (2040 B.S.) and won the Madan Puraskar same year. It is considered an experimental book in Nepali literary scene. The book has gained a special place due to the narrative and artistic practicality established by the novel.

== Synopsis ==
The book is set in a fictional town named Birahinpur on the southern part of Nepal. The village is not marked on any map. When some archaeologists visit the town to excavate for an earlier civilization, the whole town vanishes overnight The novel explores the existing exploitation in Madhesh, deprived people's lives, neglect of the state, fear, illiteracy and the remoteness of marginal life in an effective manner.

Surrealism is the major underlying theme of this book. On the one hand, the novel has a regional tone of communication, on the other hand, it has a combination of fundamental effects including anomalies, myths, self-imagination, humor and satire.

== Award ==
The book won the prestigious Madan Puraskar for the year 2040 BS.The book has gained a special place due to the narrative and artistic practicality established by the novel.

== See also ==
- Shirishko Phool
- Palpasa Café
- Ghamka Pailaharu
