= Toribari, Bata Ra Sapanaharu =

Nepali novel by Parijat

Toribari Bata Ra Sapanaharu
- Author: Parijat
- Original title: तोरीबारी, बाटा र सपनाहरु
- Language: Nepali
- Genre: Novel
- Publisher: Sajha Prakashan
- Publication place: Nepal
- Media type: Print (Paperback)

Toribari, Bata Ra Sapanaharu (eng. Mustardfields, Roads and Dreams) (Nepali: तोरीबारी, बाटा र सपनाहरु is a Nepali language novel by Parijat.

== See also ==
- Shirishko Phool
- Mahattahin
- Paribhasit Aankhaharu
- Baishko Manche
- Antarmukhi
