= Paribhasit Aankhaharu =

1964 Nepali novel by Parijat

- Author: Parijat
- Original title: परिभाषित आँखाहरु
- Language: Nepali
- Genre: Novel
- Publisher: Sajha Prakashan
- Publication place: Nepal
- Media type: Print (Paperback)

Paribhasit Aankhaharu (English: Explained Eyes; Nepali: परिभाषित आँखाहरु) is a Nepali language novel by Parijat.

== See also ==
- Shirishko Phool
- Mahattahin
- Baishko Manche
- Toribari, Bata Ra Sapanaharu
