= Mahattahin =

1968 Nepali novel by Parijat

- Author: Parijat
- Original title: महत्ताहिन
- Language: Nepali
- Genre: Novel
- Publisher: Sajha Prakashan
- Publication date: 1968
- Publication place: Nepal
- Media type: Print (Paperback)
- Pages: 65

Mahattahin (Nepali: महत्ताहिन is a Nepali language novel by Parijat. This book is written by one of the renowned writer of Nepal, Parijat. In this fiction, the writer has written about the life of an innocent person after the death of his newly married wife.

== See also ==
- Shirishko Phool
- Paribhasit Aankhaharu
- Baishko Manche
- Toribari, Bata Ra Sapanaharu
