= Shirishko Phool =

1964 Nepali novel by Parijat

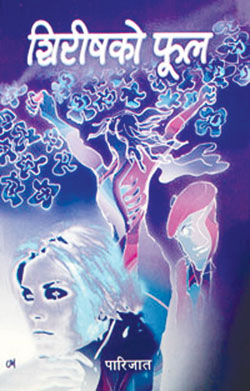
- Cover-page
- Author: Parijat
- Original title: शिरीषको फूल
- Language: Nepali
- Genre: Novel
- Publisher: Sajha Prakasan
- Publication date: 1964
- Publication place: Nepal
- Media type: Print (Paperback)
- Pages: 65
- Awards: Madan Puraskar
- ISBN: 9993340995
- OCLC: 470313792

Shirishko Phool (Nepali: शिरीषको फूल; translated into English as The Blue Mimosa), published in 1964, is a Nepali language novel by Parijat. It was the author's first and most successful novel. It was awarded the Madan Puraskar in 1965.

== Background ==
Born in an affluent family in Darjeeling, Parijat moved to Kathmandu and pursued her studies in English literature. According to her, having studied many French, Russian and Indian novels in particular, she found herself very disappointed with Nepali novels. Therefore, despite having started out as a poet, she resolved to produce an exceptional Nepali language novel. She wrote four novels while she was studying for her I.A. and B.A. degrees, all of which she burned off. Then, she became bed-ridden with illness for three years, and wrote her fifth novel Shirishko Phool in that period, which she chose to publish. Shankar Lamichhane, a prominent writer and litterateur wrote the foreword for the novel.

== Synopsis ==
Suyog meets Sakambari and her two sisters through Shivaraj. Suyog is a lonely middle-aged man and sees the three sisters with eyes of lust. He views Mujura as the quintessential woman with all the feminine virtues and the most logical choice for a wife. However, he is drawn towards Sakambari who is a rebellious personality who does not adhere to the traditional expectations of how a woman should act or dress. He finds his philosophies strongly at odds with Sakambari's and their acquaintance leads him to reevaluate his past life and actions. He comes to accept his acts such as the rape of three women he committed during the war, which he had previously rationalised as acceptable under the peril of immediate death both he and his victims were under at the time, as criminal. Suyog finds himself unable to continue without love or redemption. Reasoning that either Bari will accept him and he will have happiness or she will hurt or kill him for the transgression giving him redemption, Suyog gets hold of her and kisses her. However, Bari simply looks deeply into him and strides off, vanishing into the house. Suyog is left distraught and confused. Months after the incident, he finds out that Sakambari has died.

== Characters ==
- Suyog Bir Singh, a middle-aged Gurkha veteran who fought in Burma during the Second World War.
- Sakambari, often nicknamed Bari, a strong young woman whom Suyog falls in love with.
- Shivaraj, Suyog's drinking companion and Sakambari's brother.
- Mujura, Sakambari's older sister
- Sanu, Sakambari's younger sister

== Major themes and style ==
Themes of atheism, melancholy, and pessimism can be observed. Some parallels from Hindu mythology can also be drawn. For its progressive and critical content, it is also hailed as trailblazer for progression in Nepali literature.

The narrator is a veteran. The entire story is narrated by the veteran. He changes his views toward the war-crimes throughout the novel. First, he dismisses them, but slowly he recognizes and condemns them. The development of the novel traces two years. The changes in season and Mimosa tree are emphasized on the novel. The season mirrors his personal situation and development.

== Reception ==
Shirishko Phool was awarded the Madan Puraskar for best fiction for the year 1965. Parijat was the first woman to win the Madan Puraskar.

== Translations and adaptations ==
Shirishko Phool was translated into English by Sondra Zeidenstein with the help of Tankavilash Bharya in 1972.

The novel was adapted into a Nepali language feature film of the same name by Japanese director Toshiaki Ito. The novel was adapted into a play by Theatre Mall, Kirtipur in 2022. The play was directed by Anjan Pradip, conceptualized by Kedar Shrestha, and dramatized by Chautho Aayam group.

== See also ==
- Mahattahin
- Paribhasit Aankhaharu
- Baishko Manche
- Toribari, Bata Ra Sapanaharu
