= Sajha Publications =

Publication house in Nepal

- Status: Active
- Founded: 1913; 112 years ago
- Country of origin: Nepal
- Headquarters location: Lalitpur, Bagmati Province, Nepal
- Distribution: Sajha Purashkar
- Fiction genres: Nepali literature
- Official website: sajha.org.np

Sajha Publications (Nepali: साझा प्रकाशन, romanized: Sajha Prakashan, lit. 'Common Publication') is the oldest publishing house of Nepal. It was established in 1913 and is funded by the Government of Nepal. Headquartered in Lalitpur, it has regional branches in Biratnagar, Pokhara, Nepalgunj and Dhangadi.

Litterateur and former bureaucrat Prahlad Pokhrel is the general manager of the publishing house.

== History ==
Sajha Publications was established in 1913 (1970 BS) by the then-prime minister of Nepal, Chandra Shumsher as Gorkha Bhasa Prakashani Samiti (Gorkha Language Publishing Committee). It was renamed as Nepali Bhasa Prakashani Samiti (Nepali Language Publishing Committee) in 1933 (1990 BS). It was finally revamped as Sajha Prakashan in 1964 (2021 BS). After the rebranding as Sajha Prakashan, King Mahendra became the patron of the organization.

The publication used to work closely with the Pathyakram Vikas Samiti (Curriculum Development Committee) and Janak Shikshya Samagri Kendra (Janak Education Material Centre) to distribute the coursebook according to the curriculum of the school level. During the Panchayat rule, Sajha publication started getting mismanaged.

== Awards ==
Since 2026 BS, this publication has been awarding various awards to books and writers for their contribution to Nepali literature. Only the books published by the publication are eligible for the prizes. The awards are:

- Sajha Puraskar – This award is presented to the best book published in that year.
- Lok Sahitya Puraskar – This award is felicitated to best Nepali folklore book.
- Garima Samman Award – This award is presented to the best article and the best poem published in the Garima magazine in that year.
- Sajha Bal Sahitya Puraskar – This award is felicitated to the best Nepali children's literature.
- Sajha Lok Sankriti Puraskar – This award is given each year to one of the works on Nepali folklore, folk culture, folklore, folk songs, and folk language written in Nepali language.

== Notable Books ==
Some of the popular books published by Sajha Prakashan are:

- Muna Madan, the most selling book in Nepal
- Basain
- Alikhit
- Ghumne Mechmathi Andho Manche
- Sumnima
- Gauri
- Tarun Tapasi
- Shirishko Phool
