= Kiran Manandhar =

Nepalese artist (born 1957)

- Born: 1957 (age 68–69); Kathmandu, Nepal
- Education: Masters in Fine Arts
- Alma mater: Banaras Hindu University
- Occupation: Painter
- Known for: Nepal Academy of Fine Arts founder
- Spouse: Sarita Manandhar
- Children: 2

Kiran Manandhar (born 1957) is a Nepalese painter, who was the founding chancellor of the Nepal Academy of Fine Arts from 2010 to 2014. He is considered one of the pioneering Nepalese abstract expressionist painters.

== Early life ==
Manandhar was born in 1957 (2013 BS) in Kathmandu, Nepal, to father Purna Man Manandhar and mother Bishnu Devi. His father was a mechanic at the Royal Palace. Manandhar was interested in art from childhood. He completed his secondary level education from Juddhodaya Public High School.

== Painting career ==
Once while he was making sand sculptures on the bank of Bisnumati River, the artist Chandra Man Singh Maskey noticed his work and appreciated it. Maskey gave Manandhar his card and asked him to visit at his place. Manandhar learnt painting related to landscapes, portraits and still life for two years before he was handed to Ramananda Joshi, another prominent Nepalese artist. He studied oil painting with Joshi for the next three years.

He then met Ram Chandra Shukla, an Indian abstract artist, during an exhibition in Nepal in 2027 BS (1970-1971). Shukla invited Manandhar to study arts in India. He had his first solo exhibition at Park Gallery in 2029 BS (1972-1973).

He went to India in 1972 for his higher education and received his graduate and postgraduate degrees in fine arts from Banaras Hindu University. In Banaras, Manandhar met the Nepali Congress leader, BP Koirala, who suggested he go to France to study arts. He completed his master's degree in 1980 from India and returned to Nepal.

After staying for three years in Nepal, Manandhar went to France to study arts. In France, he won multiple awards. He used to teach French people about their history in France.

He established Palpasa Art Gallery in Jamal, Kathmandu, in 2037 BS (1980-1981). He ran the art gallery for ten years. He used his art in the protests during 1990 and 2006 Nepalese uprisings.

He was one of the key people behind the establishment of Nepal Academy of Fine Arts. The academy was established on 13 April 2010 and he was its chancellor from 2010 to 2014.

== Awards and honours ==
- Award in Hamari Kala Exhibition, Varanasi (1974)
- Award in National Art Exhibition, Nepal (1974)
- Best Prize in National Art Exhibition Nepal (1983)
- Best prize in National Art Exhibition Nepal (1986)
- Rastriya Pratibha Puraskar, His Majesty's Government, Nepal (1996)
- Medal in Silver Jubilee of King Birendra of Nepal (1997)
- Prabal Gorkha Dakshin Bahu, by King Birendra of Nepal (1999)
- Birendra Aishworya Sewa Padak (2001)

== Personal life ==
He is married to Sarita Manandhar. They have two children, a son and a daughter. Their son, Sagar Manandhar, is also an artist.

== See also ==
- Lain Singh Bangdel
- Ragini Upadhyaya
