= Nepal Academy of Fine Arts =

National institute Arts in Nepal

- नेपाल ललितकला प्रज्ञा–प्रतिष्ठान

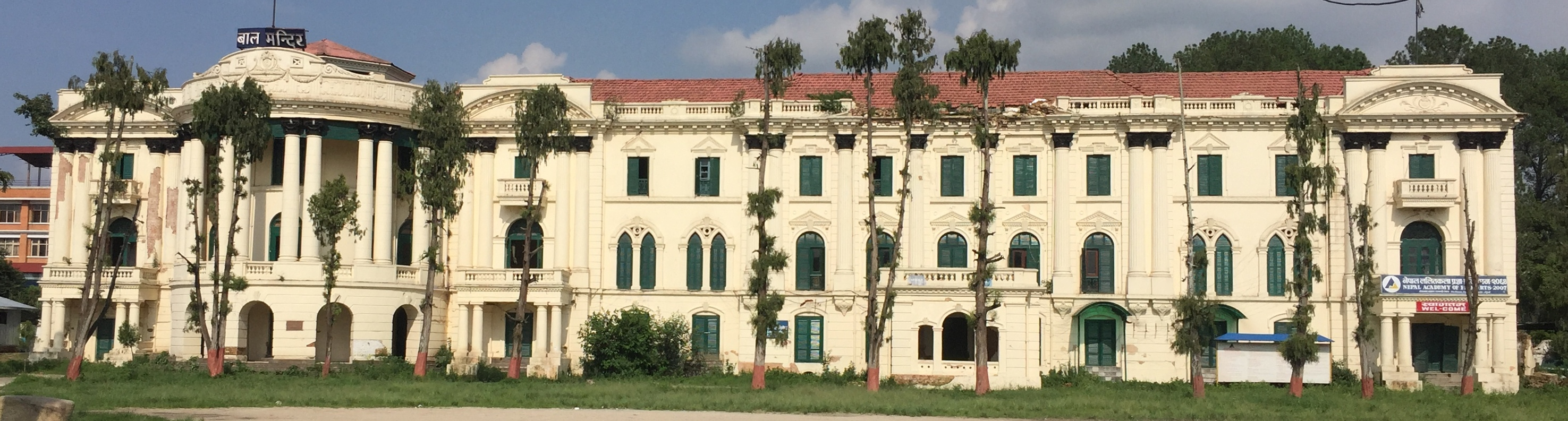
- Sita Bhawan, Naxal serves as the headquarter of the organization
- Abbreviation: NAFA
- Predecessor: Nepal Academy
- Formation: April 13, 2010; 16 years ago
- Founded at: Kathmandu
- Headquarters: Sita Bhawan, Naxal
- Location: Nepal
- Coordinates: 27°42′48.8885″N 85°19′49.32480″E
- Official language: Nepali, and other Nepalese languages
- Founding Chancellor: Kiran Manandhar
- Current Chancellor: Shambhu Rai
- Current Vice Chancellor: Gopal Chitrakar
- Parent organization: Ministry of Culture, Tourism and Civil Aviation (Nepal)
- Website: nafanepal.org

Nepal Academy of Fine Arts (NAFA) is the umbrella organization of Nepali artists, researchers and art critics, and an arts institution for research and for exhibitions. A museum in Kathmandu, in a neoclassical building from the 1930s, presents collections of both traditional and contemporary paintings and other works. It was formerly part of Nepal Academy. The Nepal Academy of Fine Arts has also published a number of books about art and Nepali artists.

== History ==
It was established on 13 April 2010 (31 Chaitra 2066 BS) by legislative parliament of Nepal and the operations were started on 15 April 2010 (2 Baisakh 2067 BS). The academy is located at Sita Bhawan, a palace built by Bhim Shamsher JBR in 1928 for his wife, Deela Kumari Devi. Kiran Manandhar served as the founding Chancellor of the academy.

== Academic Council and Academic Assembly ==
NAFA has two constituent parts - Academic Council and Academic Assembly. The major function of the Academic Assembly is to make policies and programmes for the development of Nepali art. The major function of the Academic Council is to execute those policies and programmes in association with Nepali artists. The Academy Council also collaborates with other art organizations occasionally. The Academic Council consists of Chancellor, Vice-Chancellor, Member Secretary and the Members of Academic Council. Each cabinet serves for 5 year.

== Academic Councils ==
=== First Council ===
Title	2067-2070 (2010- 2014)
Chancellor	Kiran Manandhar
Vice–Chancellor	Thakur Prashad Mainali
Member–Secretary	K.K. Karmacharya
Academicians	Sharada Chitrakar
Academicians	Karna Prasad Maskey
Academicians	Shanta Kumar Rai
Academicians	Om Bahadur Khatri
Academicians	Rabin Kuman Koirala

=== Second Council ===
Title	2071-2075 (2014-2018)
Chancellor	Ragini Upadhyaya
Vice–Chancellor	Sharada Chitrakar
Member–Secretary	Nava Raj Bhatta
Architecture and Other Creative Art Academician	Naradmani Hartamchhali
Folk Art Academician	Subodh Chandra Das
Painting Academician	Ramesh Shrestha
Sculpture Academician	Dhana Bahadur Yakhkha
Traditional Art Academician	Nima Ghyamchho Lama
Handicraft Academician	Sushama Rajbhandari

=== Third Council ===
Title	Current Council
Chancellor	Kanchha Kumar Karmacharya
Vice–Chancellor	Gopal Chitrakar
Member–Secretary	Bipin Kumar Ghimire
Architecture and Other Creative Art Academician	Ramesh Nath Khanal
Folk Art Academician	Mithila Devi
Painting Academician	Sushma Rajbhandari
Sculpture Academician	Lal Kaji Lama
Traditional Art Academician	Buddhi Bahadur Gurung
Handicraft Academician	Dharma Raj Shakya

== Departments ==
As of 2022, the departments in the academy are as follows:

- Traditional Art
- Sculpture
- Folk Art
- Painting
- Handicraft
- Architecture and other Creative Arts

== Awards ==
The academy grants many awards and honours to various artists for their contribution to Nepali artform. The awards given by the organization are:

- National Araniko Award (Rashtriya Araniko Samman)
- National Fine Arts Awards (Rashtriya Lalit Kala Puraskar)
  - Traditional Painting
  - Modern Painting
  - Modern Sculpture
  - Traditional sculpture
  - Folk Art
  - Handicraft
  - Architecture and other Creative Arts
- Special Awards
  - Traditional Painting
  - Modern Painting
  - Modern Sculpture
  - Traditional sculpture
  - Folk Art
  - Handicraft
  - Architecture and other Creative Arts
- Province-level Awards (An award from artist from each of the seven provinces)
- National Fine Arts Journalism Award (Lalit Kala Rashtriya Patrakarita Puraskar)
- National Fine Arts Writing Award (Lalit Kala Rashtriya Lekhan Puraskar)

The awards are presented annually. National Araniko Award is felicitated to two artists every year. The winners of the National Araniko Award are presented with a cash prize of रु100,000 and National Fine Arts Awards with रु60,000 for each category. Similarly, the Special and Province-level Awards carries a cash prize of रु25,000 for each category or province.

== See also ==
- Nepal Academy
- Nepal Art Council
- National Museum of Nepal
