= Sugata Saurabha (epic) =

Epic poem by Chittadhar Hridaya

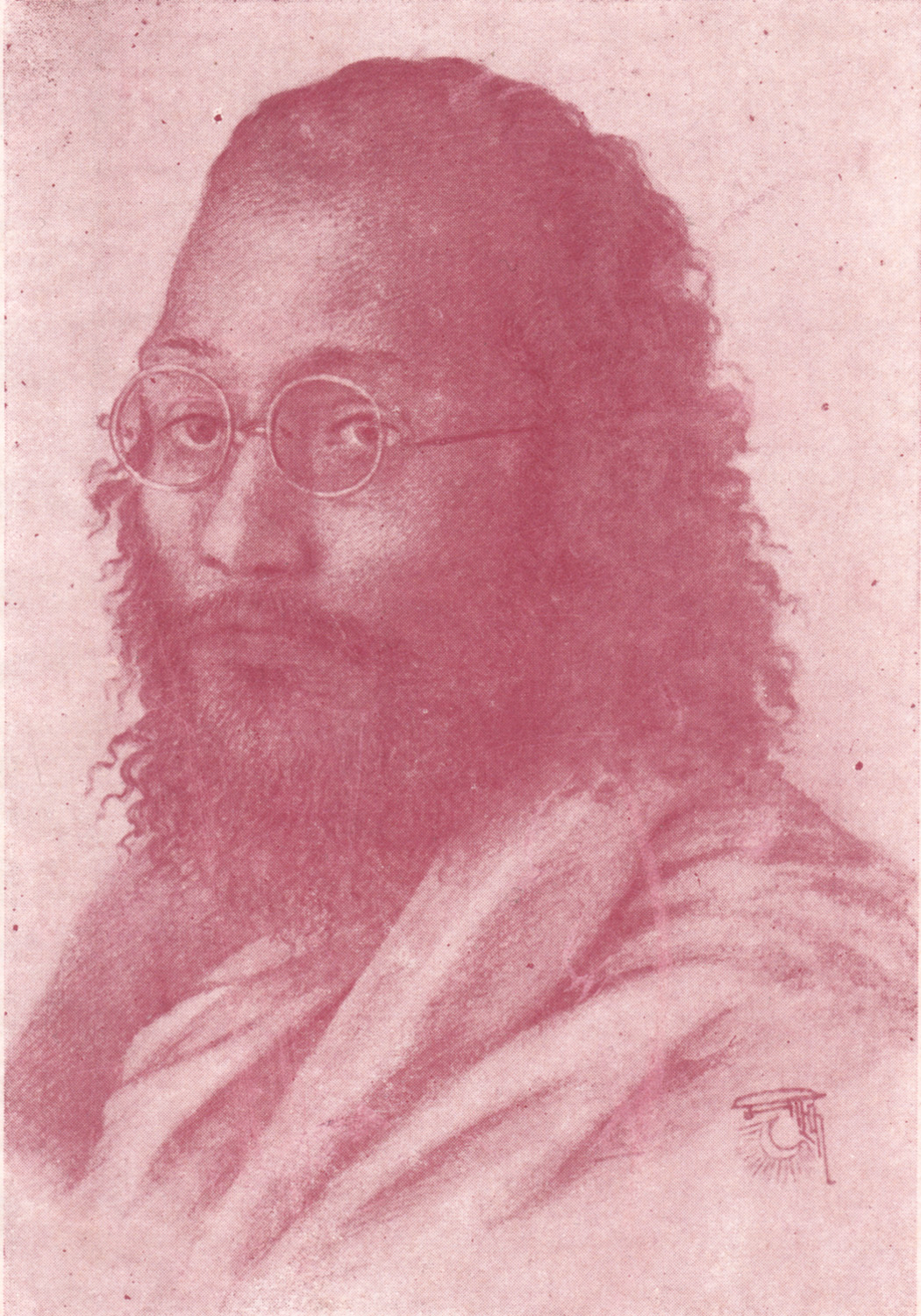
Chittadhar Hridaya, sketched in jail, ca. 1944.

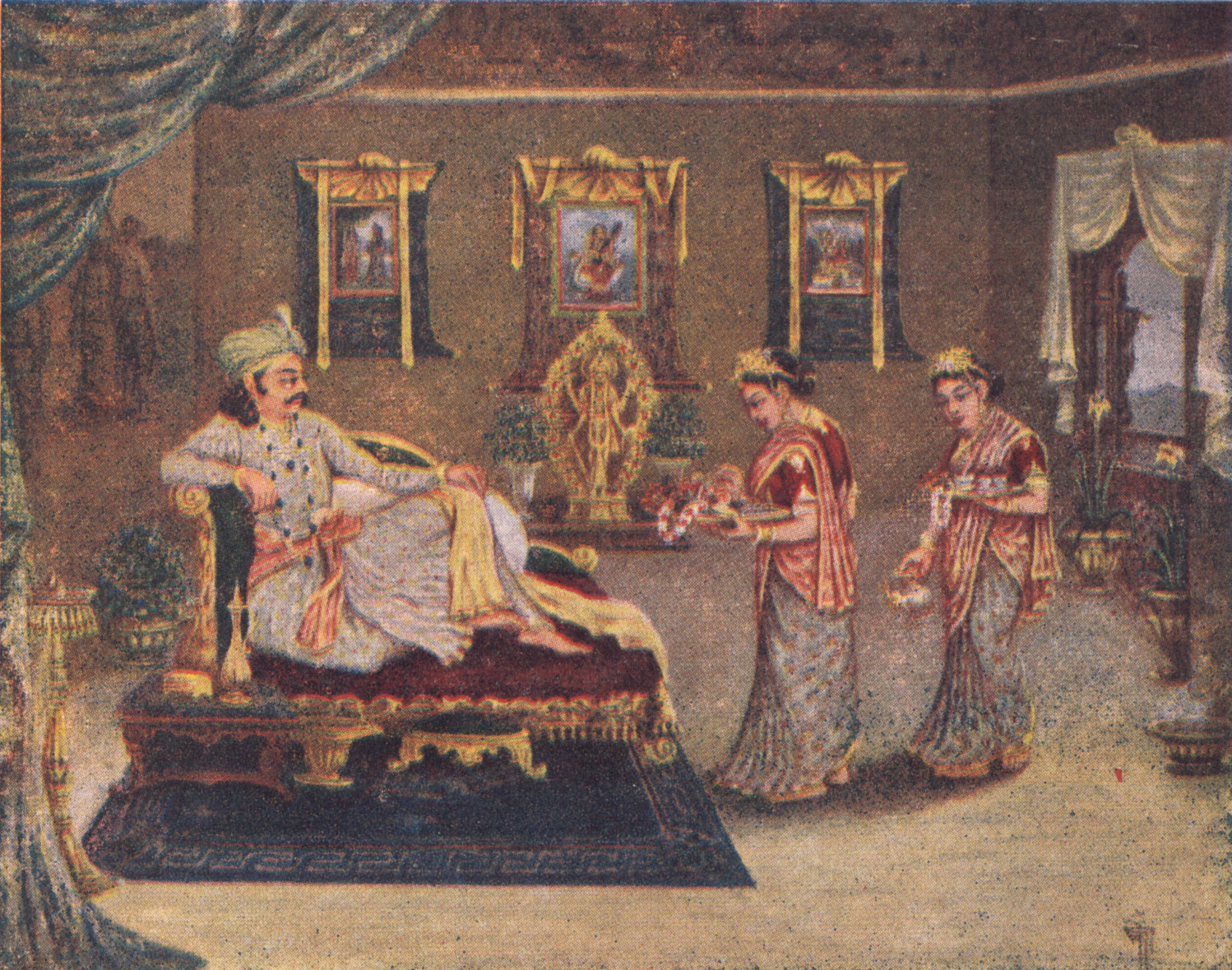
Illustration from Sugata Saurabha showing the Buddha's father Śuddhodana.

Sugata Saurabha (Nepali: सुगत सौरभ) is an epic poem in Nepal Bhasa by Chittadhar Hridaya (1906 – 1982), one of the greatest literary figures from Nepal in the 20th century. Sugata Saurabha, meaning “The Fragrant Life of the Buddha”, is based on the life story of Gautama Buddha.

== Written in jail ==
Sugata Saurabha is Hridaya's greatest work which he composed while in prison from 1941 to 1945 in Kathmandu. He was given a six-year jail sentence for writing a poem in his mother tongue, which the autocratic Rana regime sought to suppress.

Hridaya wrote Sugata Saurabha in secret in prison, and his sister Moti Laxmi Upasika would smuggle out the scraps of paper on which he had scribbled the verses when she brought him his food.

== The storyline ==
Sugata Saurabha relates the Buddha's life from birth to enlightenment to death in 19 chapters. The life story is based on classical sources, but Hridaya has filled in details from the Nepalese sociocultural context where they are not mentioned.

The epic has been described as providing an aesthetically pleasing and doctrinally sound comprehensive account of the Buddha's life, and a magnum opus in Nepal Bhasa literature.

The 19 chapters in Sugata Saurabha are entitled: 1. Lumbinī 2. Family Tree 3. Nativity 4. Mother 5. A Pleasant Childhood 6. Education 7. Marriage 8. The Great Renunciation 9. Yashodharā 10. Attaining Enlightenment 11. The Basic Teachings 12. The Blessed One in Kapilavastu 13. Handsome Nanda 14. The Great Lay Disciple 15. Twelve Years of Itinerant Preaching 16. A Dispute over Water 17. The Monastery Built by Vishākhā 18. Devadatta's Sacrilege and 19. Entry into Nirvāna.

== First publication ==
Hridaya finished the epic in 1946, a year after he was released from prison. Sugata Saurabha was first published from Kolkata, India in 1949. Artist Chandra Man Singh Maskey, who was in jail with Hridaya for alleged political activities, did the color illustrations in Sugata Saurabha.

== English translations ==
Two English versions of Sugata Saurabha have been published. In 1998, an English translation by Tirtha Raj Tuladhar was published by the Nepal Bhasa Academy, Kathmandu.

In 2010, Oxford University Press published an English translation by Todd T. Lewis and Subarna Man Tuladhar. Lewis and Tuladhar won the 2011 Toshihide Numata Book Prize awarded by the Center for Buddhist Studies at the University of California, Berkeley for their translation of the epic.
