= Gehendra Man Amatya =

Nepalese painter

Gehendra Man Amatya (Nepali: गहेन्द्र मान अमात्य) is a prominent Nepali artist recognized as a leading figure among modern Nepalese painters, particularly representing the abstract school of modern painting. He is credited as the first Nepali artist to create and exhibit modern paintings. His first solo art exhibition in 1955 marked the beginning of the modern period in Nepalese art. Amatya practiced various modern painting techniques and considered abstract art synonymous with modern art. His work reflects significant western influences.

== Early life and education ==
Gehendra Man Amatya was born around 1936 CE (Bikram Sambat 1963) in Kathmandu, Nepal. He completed a Bachelor of Commerce (B.Com.) degree from Tri-Chandra College, then affiliated with Patna University in India. Amatya received formal and informal training in fine arts under several noted artists including Chandra Man Singh Maskey, one of Nepal’s leading early modern painters.

== Recognition and awards ==
Gehendra Man Amatya has received several national honors and art awards, including:

- GorkhaDakshinBahu in 2041 B.S, by the Government of Nepal.
- JanapadSewaPadak in 2031 B.S., by the Government of Nepal.
- Coronation Medal in 2031 B.S., by the Government of Nepal.
- SAARC Medal in 1963 A.D.
- DirgaSewaPadak in 2045 B.S.

== Selected exhibitions ==
- Solo Exhibition of Modern Paintings (Kathmandu, c. 1955) – considered one of Nepal’s first abstract art shows.
- Bagmati on Canvas (2016) – participated as chief guest and speaker at the opening ceremony.

== See also ==
- Chandra Man Singh Maskey
- Shanker Raj Singh Suwal
