= Chittadhar Hridaya =

Nepalese poet

Kabi Kesari Chitta Dhar Hridaya
- चित्तधर हृदय
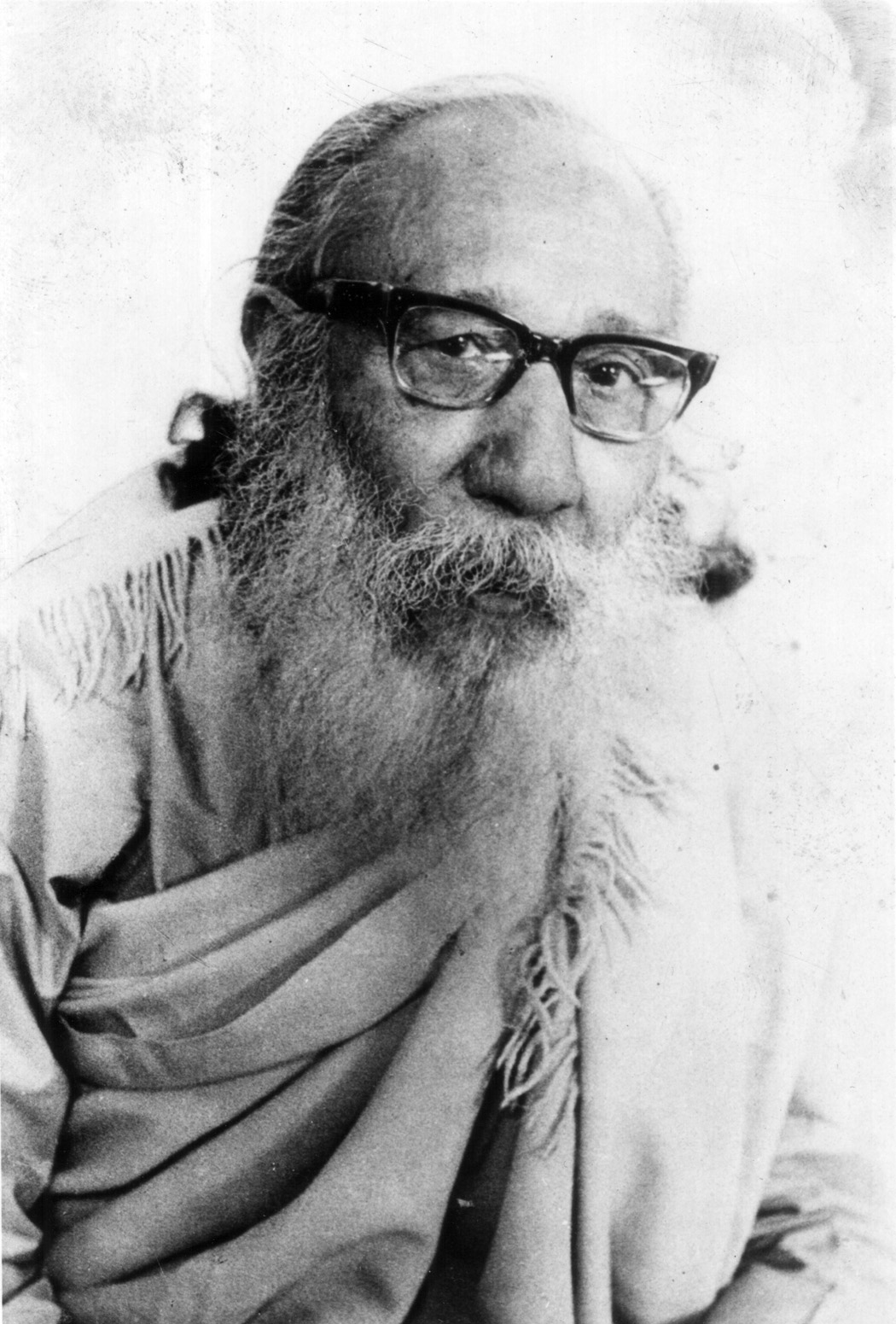
- Chittadhar Hridaya, one of the greatest literary figures from Nepal in the 20th century.
- Born: Chittadhar Tuladhar; 19 May 1906; Nyata Tunchhen
- Died: 9 June 1982 (aged 76)
- Notable work: Sugata Saurabha, Mimmanahpau
- Title: Kabi Kesari
- Movement: Nepal Bhasa renaissance
- Spouse: Gyan Prabha

Chittadhar Hridaya (Nepali: चित्तधर हृदय; born Chittadhar Tuladhar; 19 May 1906 – 9 June 1982) was a Nepalese poet. He is regarded as one of the greatest literary figures from Nepal in the 20th century.

The title of Kavi Keshari (Lion among Poets) was conferred on him by King Mahendra of Nepal in 1956. He wrote primarily in Nepal Bhasa but has created works in Nepali and Hindi too.

Hridaya dedicated his life to serving his mother tongue, rejecting a flourishing ancestral business and suffering imprisonment by an autocratic government. In 1941, he was jailed for five years by the Rana regime for writing a poem in Nepal Bhasa in a crackdown against the language.

== Early life ==
Hridaya was born Chittadhar Tuladhar at Nyata Tunchhen (Nepal Bhasa: न्यत तुंछें) in Kathmandu to a family of hereditary Lhasa Newar traders. His father was Drabya Dhar Tuladhar and his mother was Gyan Laxmi Tuladhar. His sister Moti Laxmi Upasika was also a writer.

The family owned a business house in Lhasa, Tibet. Hridaya did not join the ancestral occupation but worked to develop Nepal Bhasa literature. In 1920, he was married to Gyan Prabha Kansakar.

== Imprisonment ==
Hridaya was a member of the Nepal Bhasa renaissance. He began his literary career when the Ranas did not permit writing in Nepal Bhasa, so authors published their works from abroad.

Hridaya wrote his first poem Buddhopasakya Pap Deshana which was printed in 1925 in Buddha Dharma magazine and published in Kolkata, India. In 1930, he signed a petition to open a public library, and was arrested and fined along with the rest of the signers.

In 1933, an anthology of poems by Hridaya entitled Padya Nikunja was published in Kalimpong, India by SP and DP Upasak. He wrote under the pen name Hridaya to avoid harassment by the government. The government did not like his literary activities, and all the copies were confiscated by customs at Chisapani Gadhi before they could reach Kathmandu.

The anthology contained a poem entitled Mother which he had written while mourning his mother's death. He had signed the poem "Motherless child" which the government took to mean that it had deprived the Newars of their mother tongue. For this reason, the poem was deemed subversive; and in 1940, he was sentenced to six years in jail.

Hridaya began his sentence on January 20, 1941. His fellow inmate poets Siddhicharan Shrestha and Phatte Bahadur Singh had also been imprisoned for producing works in Nepal Bhasa.

== Sugata Saurabha epic ==
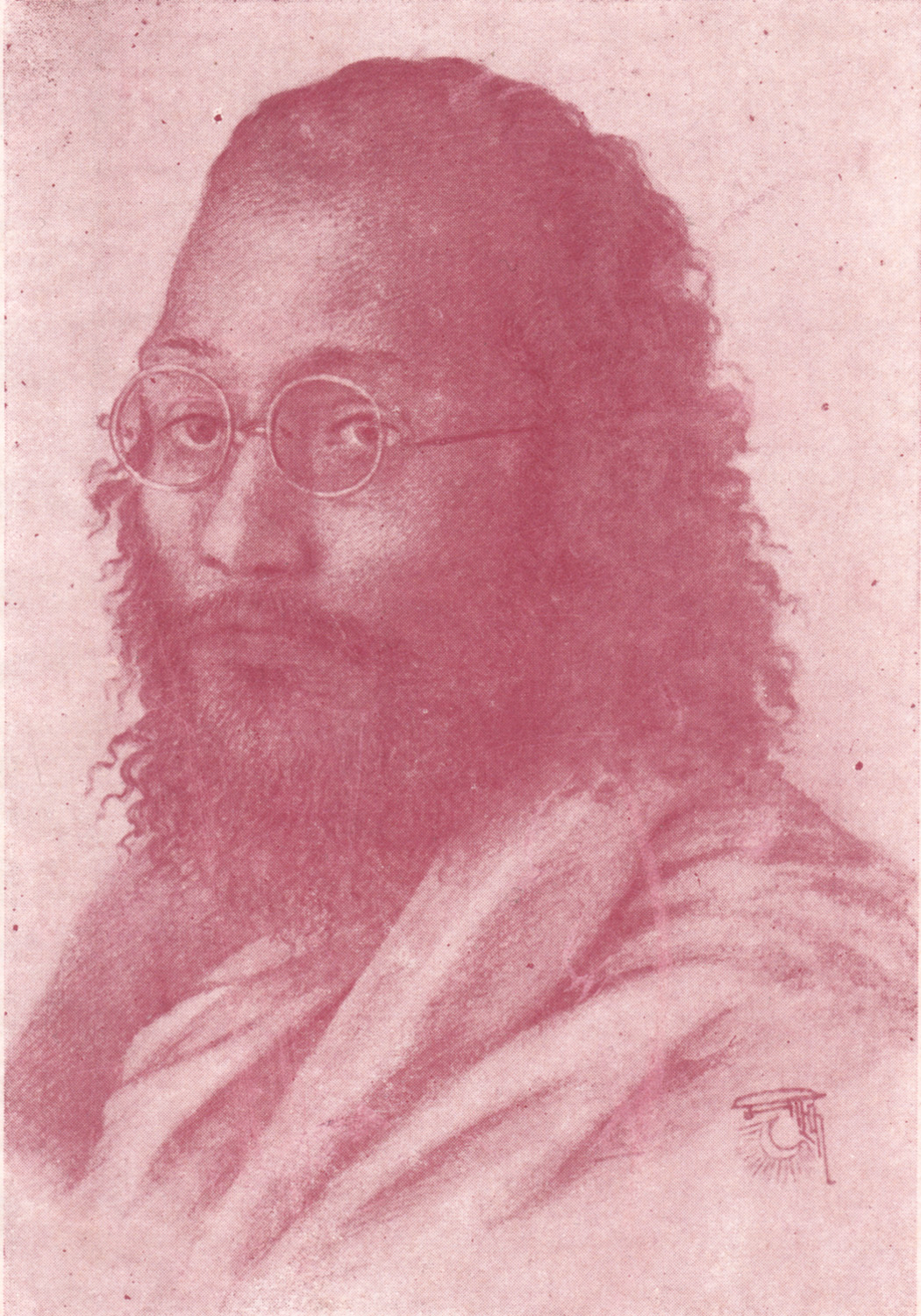
Chittadhar Hridaya, sketched in jail, ca. 1944.

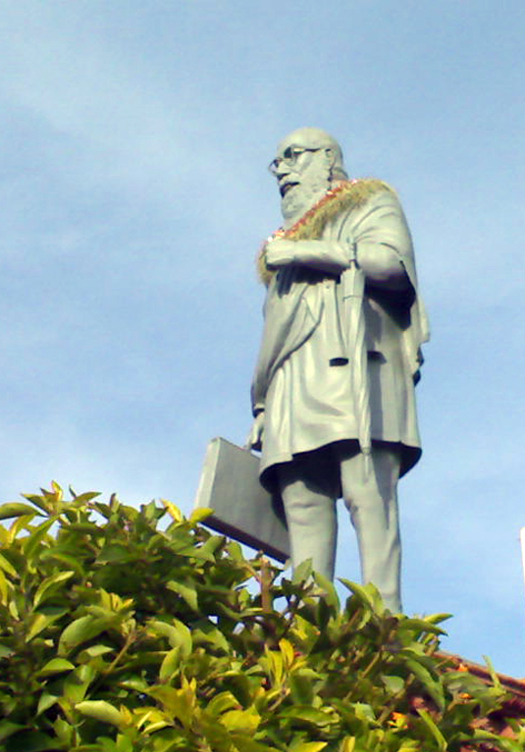
Statue of Chittadhar Hridaya erected at Kalimati intersection in Kathmandu in 2008.

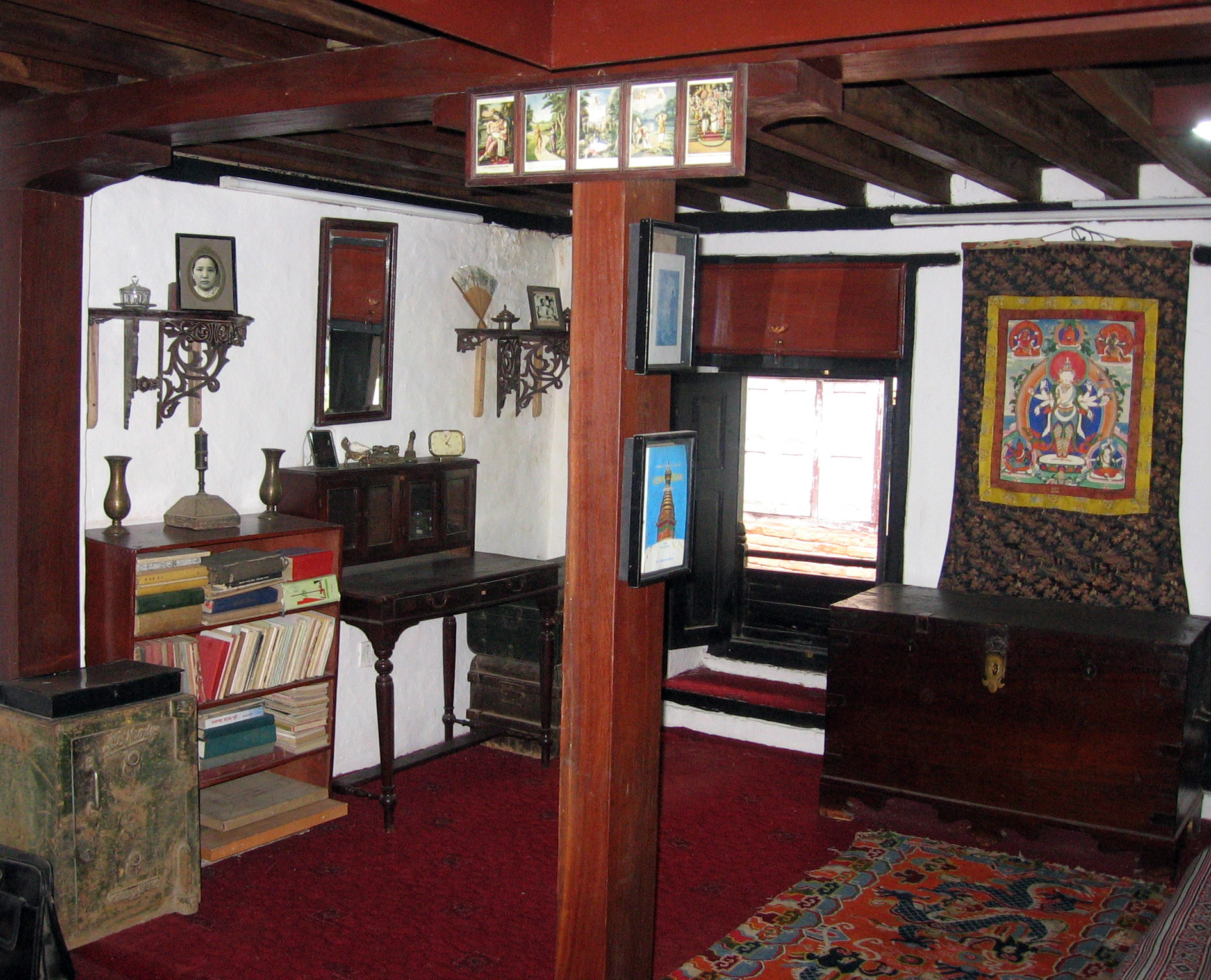
Hridaya's room at the memorial museum.

While in jail, Hridaya produced his greatest work Sugata Saurabha, an epic poem on the life of the Buddha. He had to write in secret in prison, and his sister Moti Laxmi Upasika smuggled out the scraps of paper on which he had scribbled the verses when she brought him his food.

It was completed in 1946 after his release from prison, and published from Kolkata in 1949. The epic has been described as providing an aesthetically pleasing and doctrinally sound comprehensive account of the Buddha's life, and also a magnum opus in Nepal Bhasa literature.

While in jail from 1941 to 1945, Hridaya came into contact with artist Chandra Man Singh Maskey. Hridaya trained under Maskey in secret, as he hid his writings from the prison guards. He has produced a number of paintings in watercolor, pencil, and ink. They depict Buddhist and Hindu deities and genre scenes. The color illustrations in Sugata Saurabha were done by Maskey.

Following his release from prison on 11 November 1945, Hridaya produced a flurry of works in different genres. He was a pioneer in writing modern short stories. His Six Short Stories published in 1947 was a landmark in contemporary Nepal Bhasa literature.

== Nepal Bhasa Parishad ==
In 1951, Hridaya got together with other prominent poets and writers and established Nepal Bhasa Parishad (Nepal Bhasa Council) to promote the institutional development of Nepal Bhasa. It was inaugurated on 7 June 1953 by Buddha Maya Kansakar, the wife of poet Yogbir Singh Kansakar, amid a ceremony at the home of Tara Bir Singh at Chhatrapati. Its office was later moved to his own home at Nyata Tunchhen. Hridaya subsequently bequeathed the property to the council.

Hridaya was the editor of Nepal Ritupau published by Nepal Bhasa Parishad from 1952 to 1956. He also lobbied with the government to have Nepal Bhasa included in the school and college curriculum. It was included in the course of study at the high school level in 1954, at the intermediate level in 1960, bachelor level in 1962 and Master's level in 1979.

Hriday suffered a stroke leaving his right hand and leg paralyzed. He taught himself to write with his left hand and continued to produce poetry and essays. On 9 June 1982, Hridaya collapsed while presiding over a meeting of Nepal Bhasa Parishad.

== Legacy ==
Nepal's Postal Services Department issued a commemorative postage stamp bearing a portrait of Hridaya on 31 December 1992 to mark the tenth anniversary of his death.

Coinciding with World Poetry Day, the Foundation of SAARC Writers and Literature celebrated the centenary of Chittadhar Hridaya on March 21, 2007.

On 8 November 2008, a statue of Hridaya was erected at Kalimati crossroads in downtown Kathmandu. Prime Minister Pushpa Kamal Dahal unveiled the life-sized image. Chittadhar Marg, a street in central Kathmandu, was named in his honor by Kathmandu Metropolitan City.

== Memorial Museum ==
Hridaya's home was renovated in 2010 with Indian assistance to house a museum dedicated to the poet and his works. The Chittadhar Hridaya Memorial Museum opened on 20 July 2013. It contains photographs, books, sketches, personal belongings and household items. The room where Hridaya lived and worked has been maintained in its original form. Located in the historical section of Kathmandu, the house is also a specimen of traditional Nepalese architecture with Newar windows of carved wood. It encloses a typical courtyard containing shrines and a well.

== Notable works ==
Hridaya wrote epics, dramas, poetry, novels, short stories, history and grammar.

- Sugata Saurabha ("The Fragrant Life of the Buddha"), his most famous work, tells of the life of the Buddha in 19 cantos in a Newar cultural setting. It has been translated into English by Todd T. Lewis and Subarna Man Tuladhar. An earlier English translation done by Tirtha Raj Tuladhar was published by Nepal Bhasa Academy in 1998.
- Mimmanahpau ("Unburnt Letter") is a novel-length letter from a merchant in Lhasa to his wife in Kathmandu. Published in 1968, it describes the cultural and social observations of a Newar trader in the Tibetan capital and his feelings for his family separated by a great distance. Mimmanahpau has been translated into English by Kesar Lall. Childless Hridaya called Sugata Saurabha his son and Mimmanahpau his daughter.
- Six Short Stories. Hridaya's short stories are influenced by his interest in cultural revival and social reform. A number of his short stories including three from Six Short Stories have been translated into English by Tej Ratna Kansakar.
- Jhi Maca ("Our Child"), published in 1947 from Varanasi, India by Dharmodaya Sabha, is a collection of children's stories that provide an intimate sense of what the culturally vibrant and densely settled Newar society looks like from within. It has been translated into English by Todd T. Lewis.

== Gallery ==
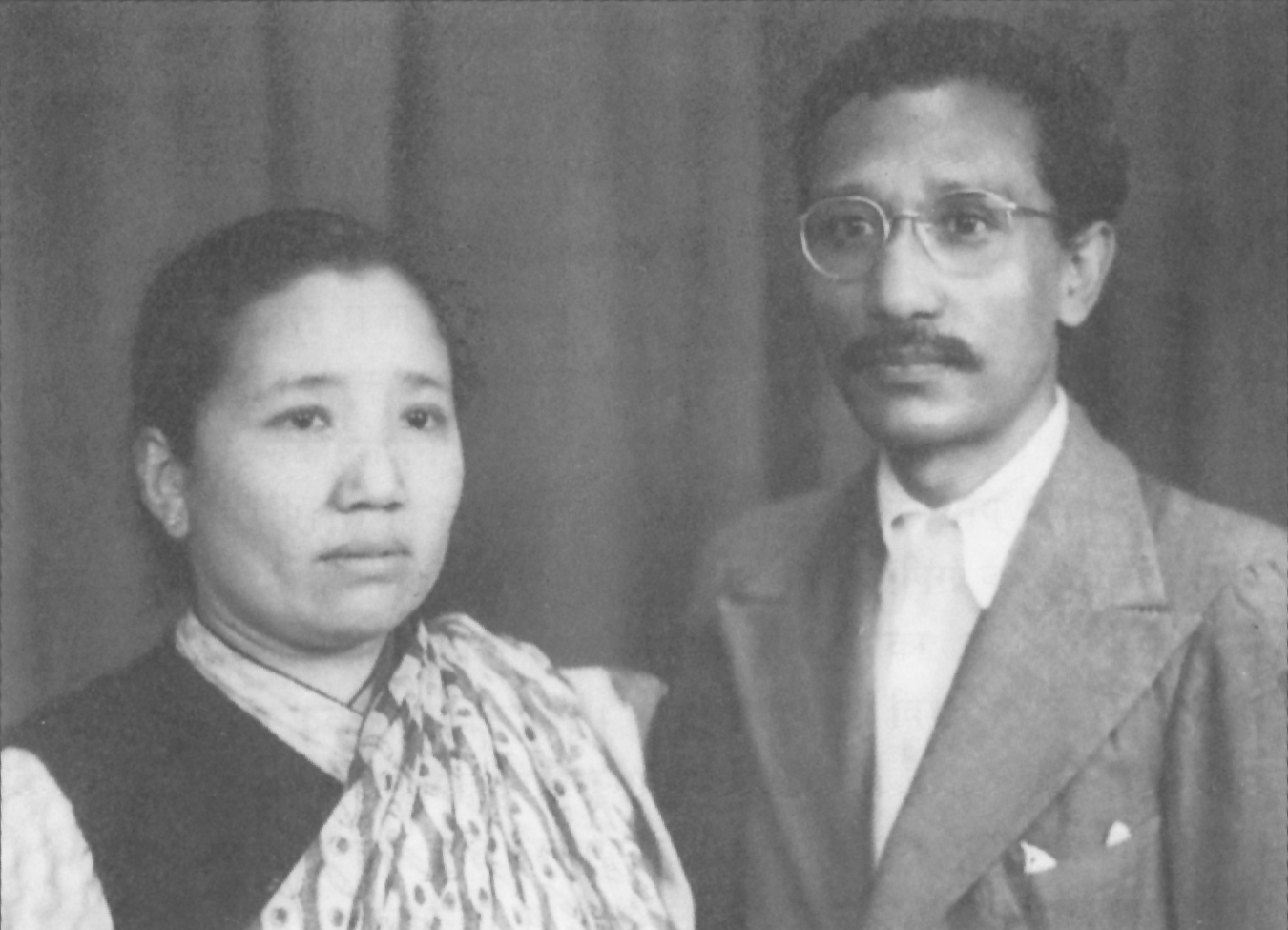
A young Chittadhar with wife Gyan Prabha.

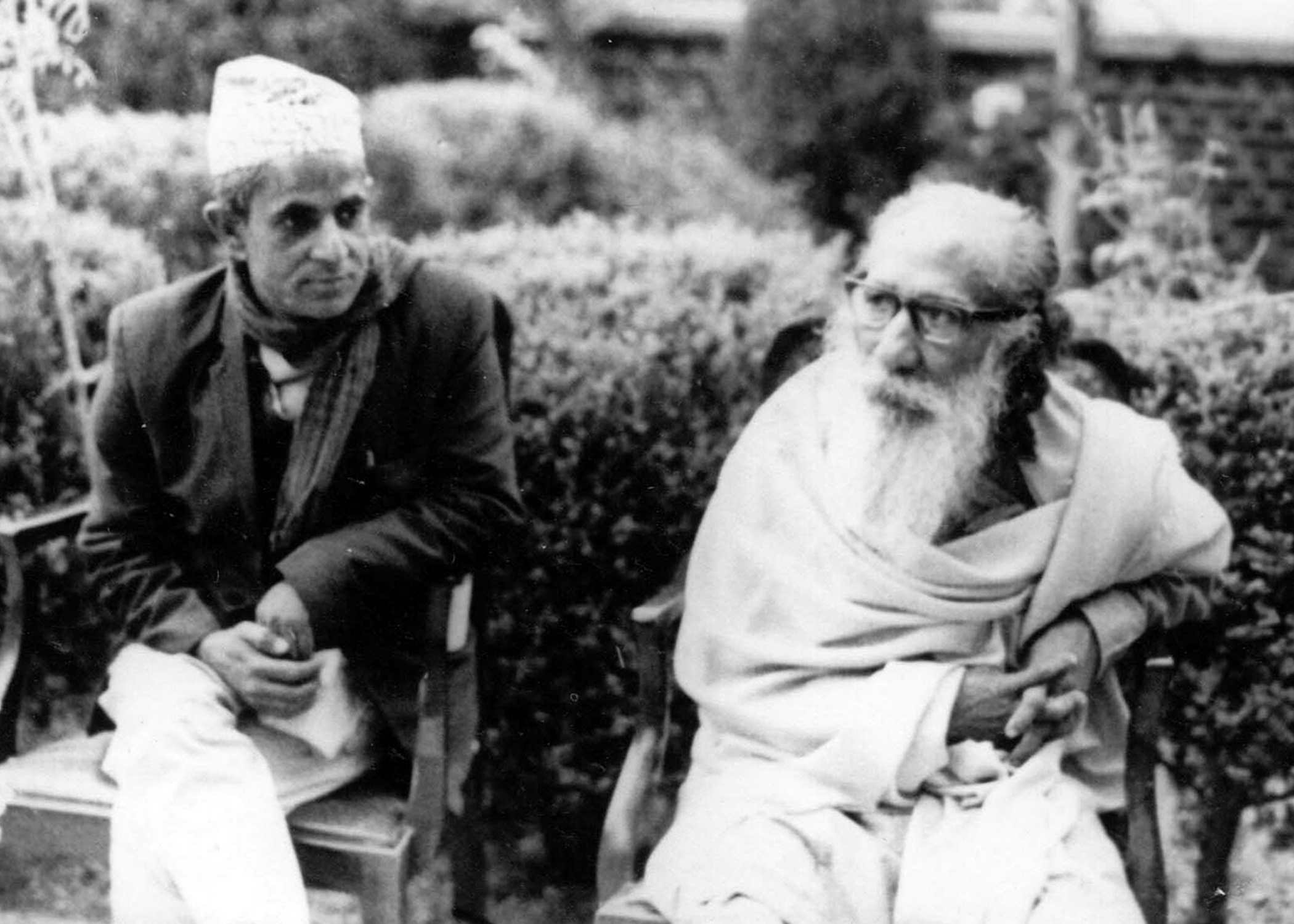
Madan Mohan Mishra (left) with Hridaya.

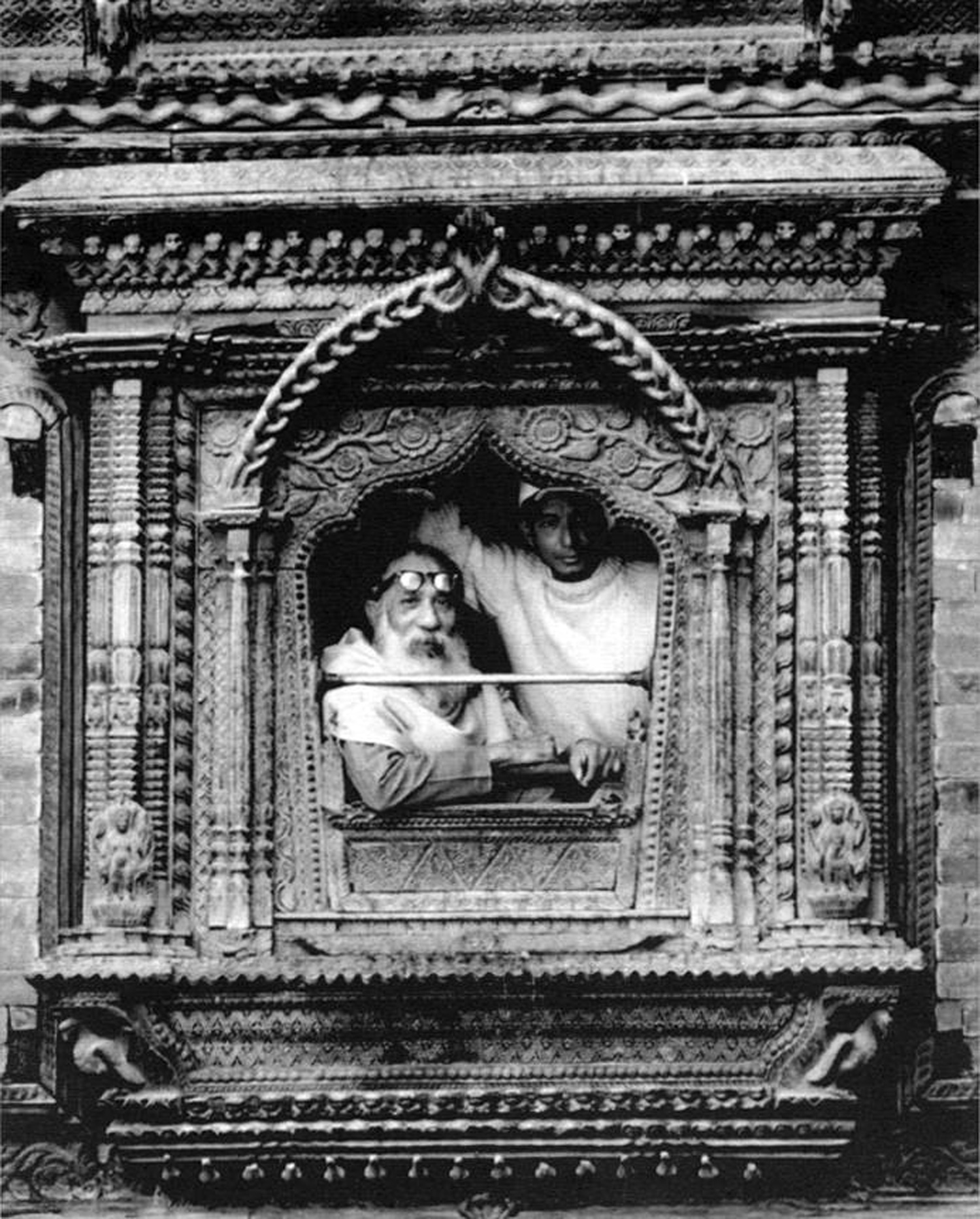
Chittadhar sitting at a traditional window.

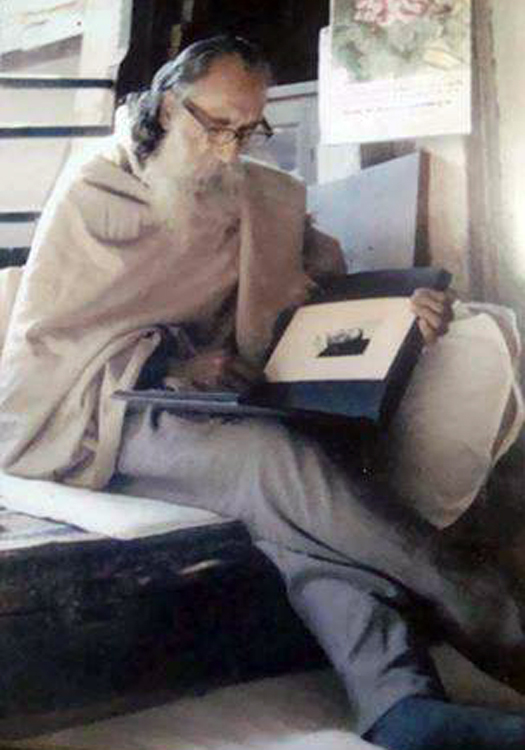
Chittadhar at home.

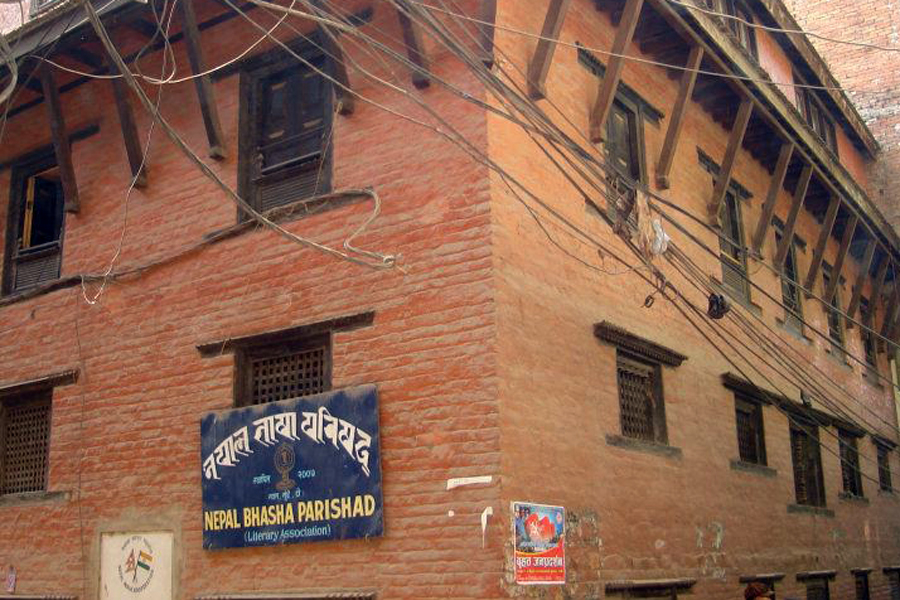
Chittadhar Hridaya Memorial Museum.

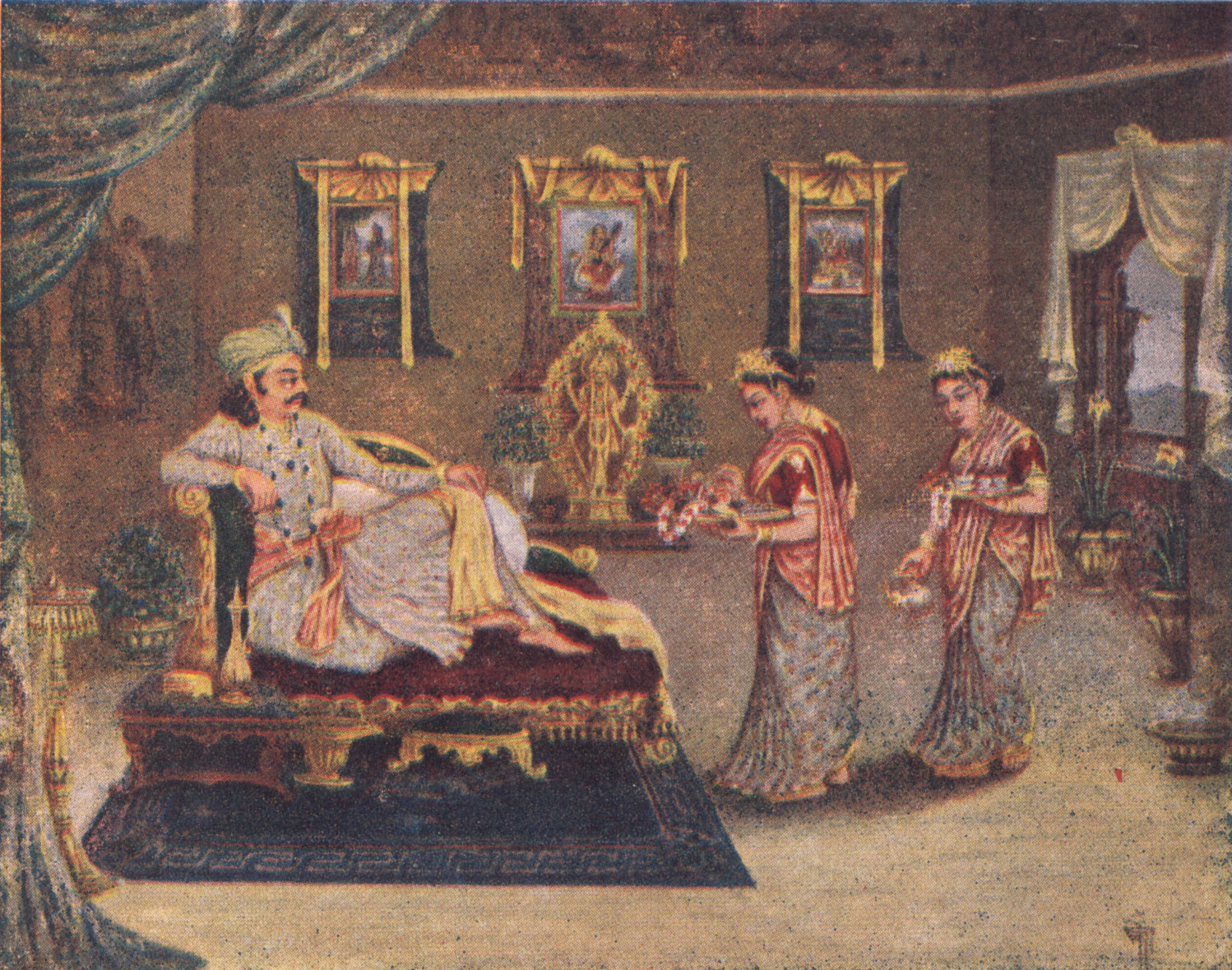
Illustration from Sugata Saurabha.
