= Shanker Raj Singh Suwal =

Nepali painter

Shankar Raj Singh Suwal
- शंकर राज सिंह सुवाल
- Born: 1948; Kathmandu, Nepal
- Died: 2021 (aged 72–73)
- Years active: 1960s–2021
- Known for: Modern Nepali painting, watercolor, surrealism
- Notable work: Retrospective Paintings Exhibition (2017)
- Movement: Contemporary Nepali art

Shankar Raj Singh Suwal (Nepali: शंकर राज सिंह सुवाल; 1948 – 2021) was a Nepali painter and one of the senior figures in modern Nepali art, known for his depictions of peace, spirituality, and Nepali cultural identity. His paintings blend elements of Hindu and Buddhist mythology.

== Early life and education ==
Suwal was born in Kathmandu, Nepal, in 1948. Little is publicly documented about his formal art education, but by the early 1960s he had begun exhibiting his works in Nepal's emerging art scene.

== Career ==
Suwal's artistic journey spanned more than 60 years. His works have been exhibited at the Nepal Art Council and other prominent galleries across Kathmandu. A retrospective exhibition in December 2017 showcased paintings spanning his entire career, marking his long-standing contribution to Nepalese art.

== Style and themes ==
Suwal's art merges traditional Nepali motifs with modernist expression. His compositions often employ surreal imagery, soft gradients, and symbolic color tones to evoke inner emotion and spirituality. He drew inspiration from both Hindu and Buddhist iconography, reinterpreting them through a humanistic and peace-oriented lens. Critics have described his work as both “philosophically grounded” and “visually poetic,” bridging the divide between classical Nepali aesthetics and contemporary abstraction. His paintings often combine religious symbolism with contemporary social commentary. One of his notable series depicts the Hindu god Ganesha engulfed in abstract cosmic clouds, reflecting spiritual introspection and universal harmony.

== Legacy ==
Suwal is recognized as one of Nepal's senior modern artists and a mentor to many younger painters. His six-decade career contributed significantly to shaping the post-1960s generation of Nepali artists.

== See also ==
- Gehendra Man Amatya
