= Chandra Man Singh Maskey =

Nepalese artist (1900–1984)

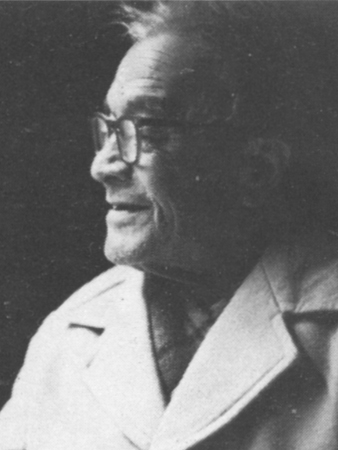
Chandra Man Singh Maskey

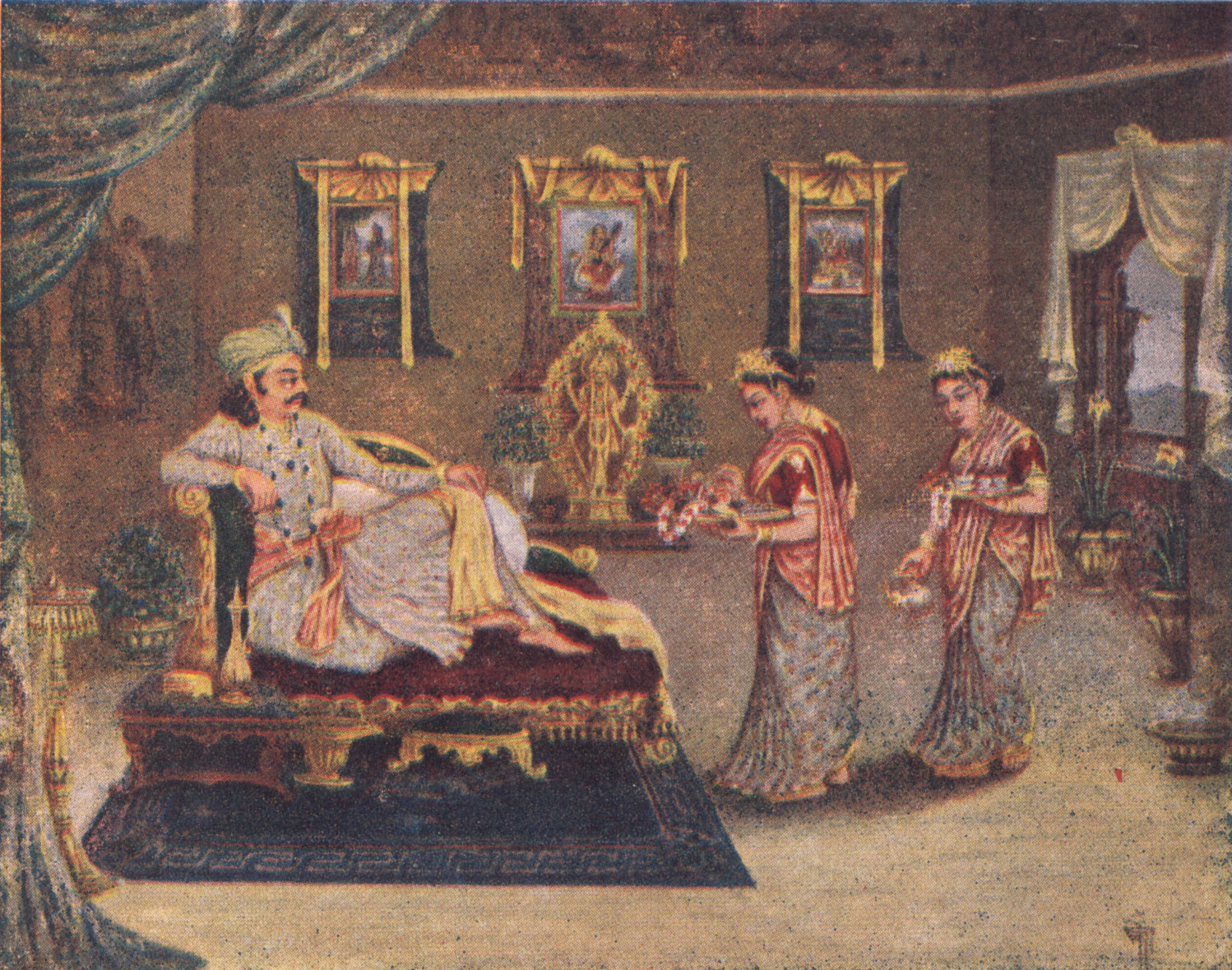
Illustration from Sugata Saurabha

Chandra Man Singh Maskey (Nepali: चन्द्रमानसिंह मास्के; 1900–1984) was a Nepalese artist who was one of the leaders in the development of contemporary art in Nepal in the early 20th century. Maskey spearheaded the trend of creating art using new techniques for its aesthetic value, and introduced a new style in the milieu of traditional art which is essentially religious and follows descriptions laid down in ancient texts.

== Early life ==
Maskey was born in Kathmandu to a Newar family that traditionally served as officials in the government. He abandoned family tradition and chose art as a career. He was also one of the very few Nepalese artists to get an opportunity to study modern art abroad, as the autocratic Rana regime kept tight control on modern education. In those days, the king was a nominal ruler while the Rana prime minister for life held actual power.

From 1918 to 1923, Maskey studied art at the Government School of Art, Kolkata. He was among the first two officially recognized art teachers in Nepal. The other was Tej Bahadur Chitrakar (1898-1971). After returning to Kathmandu, Maskey held the first ever one-man exhibition in Nepal in 1928. He also began teaching art at Durbar High School and Padma Kanya Girls High School.

== In jail ==
Maskey aroused the anger of the Rana regime by starting a public school, and it looked for an opportunity to punish him. In 1940, he was convicted of drawing an anti-Rana cartoon and sentenced to 18 years in jail and all his property was confiscated. Maskey served five years and was released in 1945.

In prison, one of his fellow inmates was poet Chittadhar Hridaya who had been given a six-year sentence for writing a poem about his late mother which was deemed subversive. Hridaya spent his time in prison secretly writing an epic based on the Buddha's life. Maskey drew the paintings to illustrate the epic entitled Sugata Saurabha which was published when they were both released.

== Later years ==
Two years after being released from prison, Maskey resumed teaching at Padma Kanya Girls High School. In 1957, he and his friends opened the Popular University of Kathmandu which was shut down after six months. Maskey has served as the director of Nepal National Museum, Department of Culture and Archaeology and National Zoo, and adviser to the Nepal Association of Fine Arts (NAFA).

Maskey's paintings have been described as a chronicle of Nepalese life and culture. He has painted everyday scenes of rural Nepal as well as ceremonies and celebrations. His works consist of pencil, pen and ink drawings, oils and watercolors.

== Honors ==
In 1995, the Postal Services Department of Nepal issued a commemorative postage stamp depicting a portrait of Chandra Man Singh Maskey to honor his contribution to the development of art in Nepal.

== See also ==
- Gehendra Man Amatya, contemporary Nepalese painter
