= Moti Laxmi Upasika =

Nepali poet and short story writer

- मोतिलक्ष्मी उपासिका
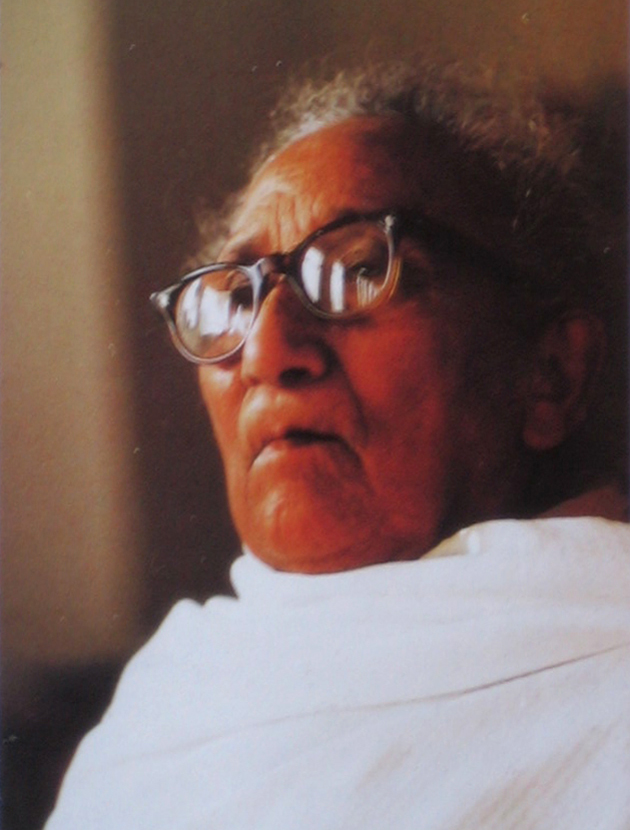
- Moti Laxmi Upasika was the first woman short story writer of Nepal.
- Born: Moti Laxmi Tuladhar; 13 June 1909; Kathmandu
- Died: 1997 (aged 87–88)
- Other names: M. Laxmi
- Notable work: Chakhunchiya Sarbay
- Parents: Drabya Dhar Tuladhar (father); Gyan Laxmi Tuladhar (mother)
- Relatives: Chittadhar Hridaya (brother)

Moti Laxmi Upasika (Nepali: मोतिलक्ष्मी उपासिका) (30 June 1909 – 1997) was Nepal's first woman poet and short story writer of modern times. Her first work, a short story, was published in 1935.

== Early life ==
Moti Laxmi Upasika (also spelled Motilakshmī Upāsikā) was born in Kathmandu to father Drabya Dhar and mother Gyan Laxmi Tuladhar. Her father was a merchant who owned a business house in Lhasa, Tibet. Her brother was a poet Chittadhar Hridaya. She received informal education in Sanskrit, Pali and English.

== Writing career ==
Upasika, who also wrote under the pen name M. Laxmi, published her first work in 1935, a story in the Nepali language entitled Rodan. It appeared in Sharada magazine published from Kathmandu.

She started writing in Nepal Bhasa with a poem entitled Chitta Panchhi (meaning "Heart bird") and a story Lan ("Road") which were published in Dharmadoot in 1944. Dharmadoot was a Buddhist magazine published in Hindi by the Maha Bodhi Society from Sarnath, India. It also published contributions in Nepal Bhasa at the request of its subscribers in Nepal.

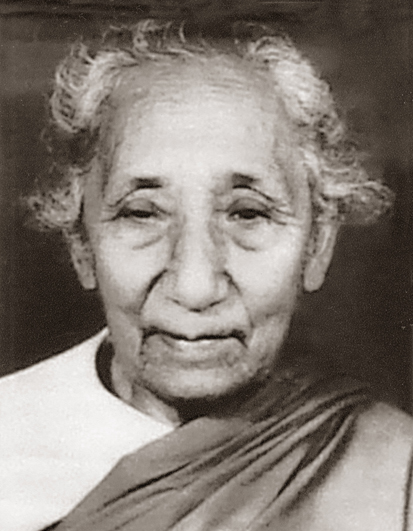
Portrait of Upasika

Though most of her essays deal with religious subjects, her writings have been described as a bridge between religious and free prose. Her essays are characterized by simple language and a powerful way of expressing her opinions.

== Published works ==
- Motima ("Garland of Pearls"), a collection of essays, 1958
- Chakhunchiya Sarbay ("Sparrow's Property"), a collection of poems, 1993
- Moti Bakhan Puchah ("Moti Collection of Stories"), a collection of short stories, 1994
- Utpalvarna, a collection of Buddhist stories, 1995
- Dhaubaji ("Yogurt and Rice Flakes"), a collection of essays, 1998
