= Nepalese sculpture =

Figurine sculpture of Nepal

Nepalese Sculpture

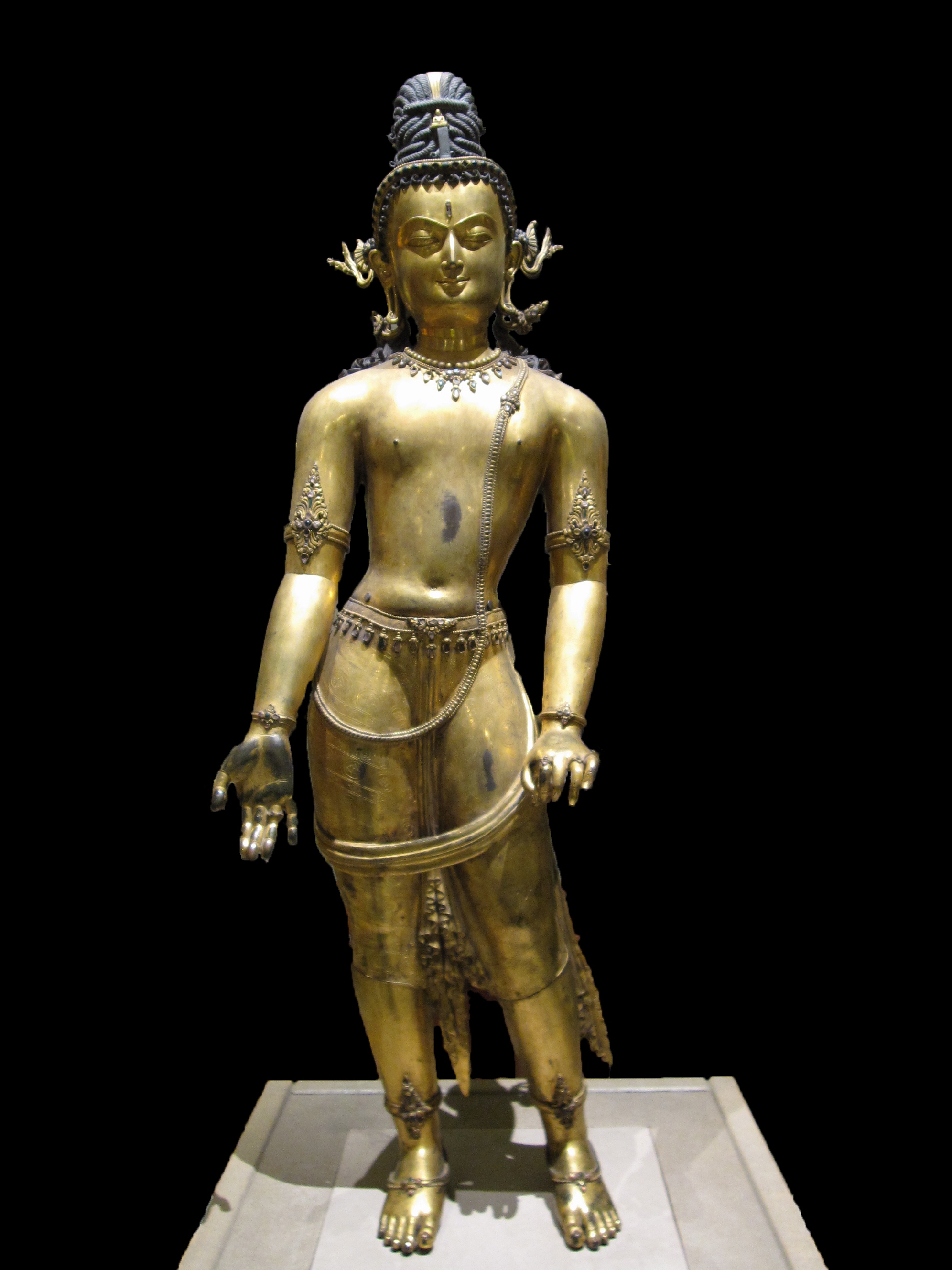
The Bodhisattva Avalokiteshvara, gilded bronze, c. 16th century CE, presently at the British Museum.

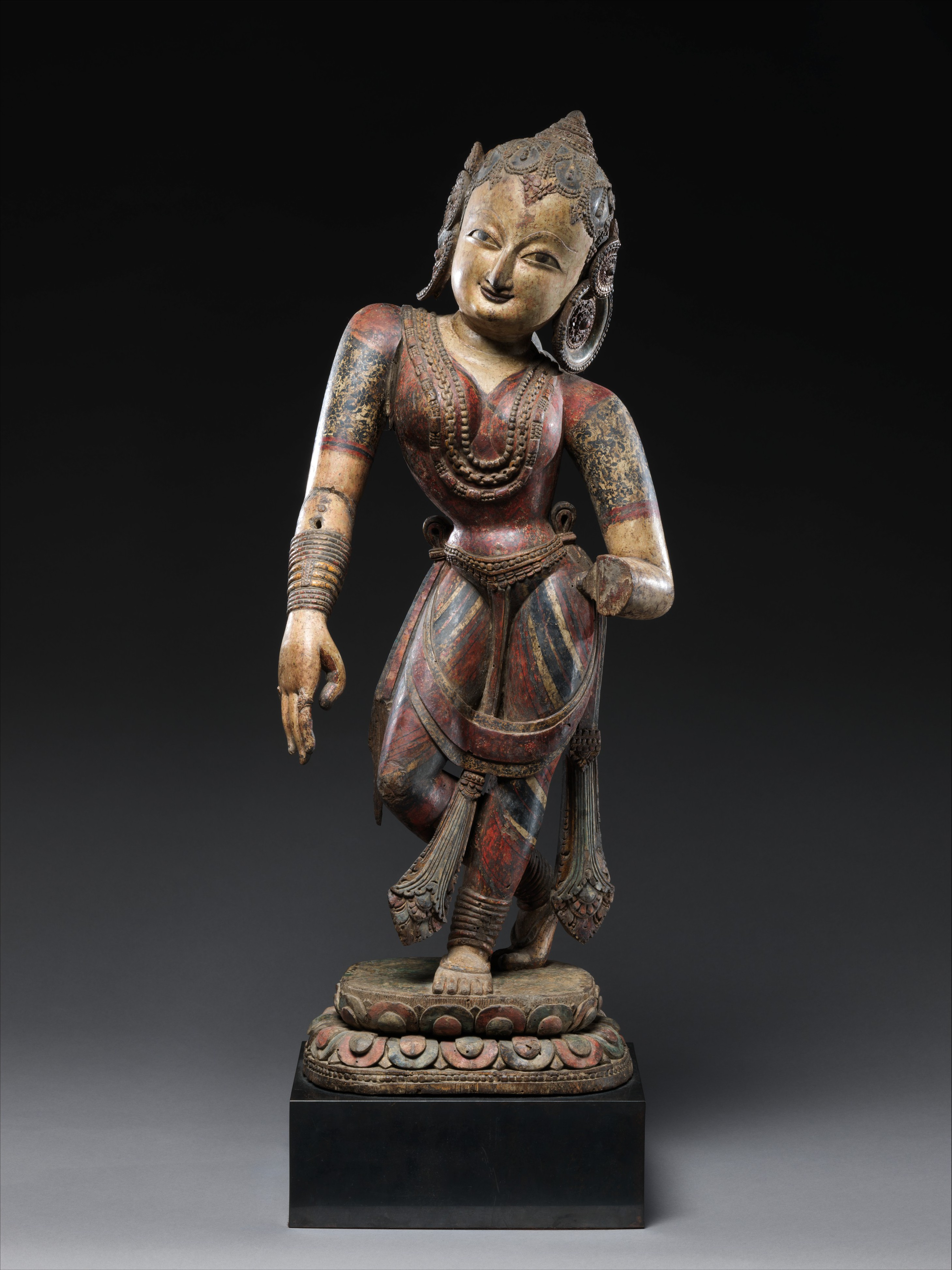
Nrtyadevi, the Goddess of Dance, c. 16th century CE, at the Metropolitan Museum of Art.

The sculpture of Nepal is best known for small religious figures and ritual objects in bronze or copper alloy, but also has other strengths. The Newar people of Nepal had a long-lasting specialism in casting small bronze figures, mostly religious and especially Buddhist, considerable numbers of which were exported to India and Tibet over many centuries.

== Stylistic history ==
Though the most common survivals are small figures, for reasons of climate and history, Nepal also has an unusual quantity of surviving large sculptures in wood and bronze, which have mostly been lost in India, where significant quantities of metal sculpture from temples have only survived in Tamil Nadu and other parts of the far south. Though there are small figures similar to those in bronze, most woodcarving is architectural, including the elaborate Newar windows.

Nepali sculpture draws influences from the sculpture and artistic styles of Indian art, of the Gupta and Pala Empires in particular. The majority of the surviving sculptures depict religious figures and subjects, drawn from both Hinduism and Buddhism, as the two religions have coexisted peacefully in the Nepalese region for over two thousand years.

Although drawing on the sculptural traditions of India, and the religious iconography of Buddhism and Hinduism, Nepalese sculpture evolved into its own distinctive style, with a tendency towards more ornate flourishes, exaggerated physical postures and elongated depictions of facial features. In Nepal, as in Tibet, "the last phase of Buddhist art in India enjoyed a prolongation of nearly a thousand years", as Buddhism virtually disappeared in India itself. Style in metal continued to develop until recent centuries, until about the 17th century, after which it changed little.

== Newar artists ==
Historically, Newars mostly followed a distinct non-monastic form of Newar Buddhism, and had their own caste system. As in medieval India, artists worked on both Hindu and Buddhist sculptures, in very largely the same style. They mostly lived in the Kathmandu Valley.

Araniko, known mainly as an architect and painter, but also a sculptor in bronze, is the best-known Newar artist. In 1278 he led a group of 60 (or 80) Newar craftsmen, mostly metalworkers, sent to Tibet, and subsequently the court of Kubilai Khan in China, where he remained.

The Licchavi period, named after the ruling Licchavi family, spanned 400-750 AD. A sculpture of Baman Tribikram erected by Lichchhavi king Man Dev is considered to be the oldest sculpture in Nepal. Sculptures that were created during the Licchchhavi period include ones of Palanchowk Bhagawati, Budhanilkantha, etc. The statues inside Changu Narayan Temple and around it, statue of Palanchowk Bhagawati, statue of Budhanilkantha are few examples of sculptures made during the Licchchhavi period of time.

== Malla period ==
The rulers of the Malla period (c. 1201–1779 CE) patronized both Buddhist and Hindu beliefs and traditions, which led to both forms of religious iconography flourishing in art and sculpture. The Newar people that originally inhabited the Kathmandu Valley traveled extensively through the region and became the dominant influence in terms of artistic style throughout the region and extending out through the Himalayas.Works of deities including Ganesha, Shiva, Vishnu, Surya, Laxmi, Saraswati, Gautama Buddha, etc. were created during this period. Other figures of kings and gods were also common pieces. Advancements in technique included the development of molding, the sculpting of clothing ornaments, and themes based on Tantric thought and practice.

== Examples ==
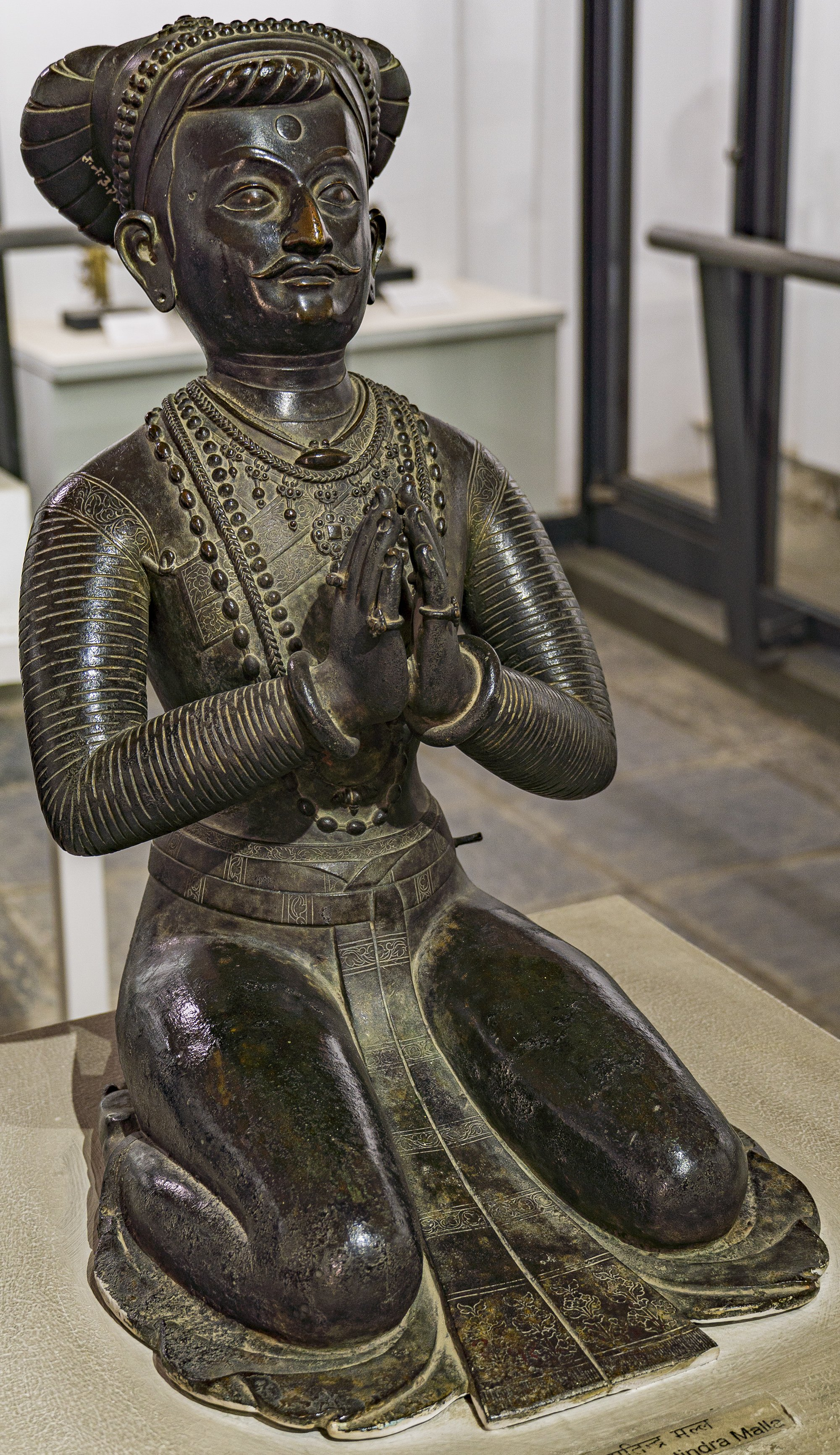
Bronze statue of King Bhupatindra Malla of Bhaktapur from the 18th century, presently at the National Museum of Nepal

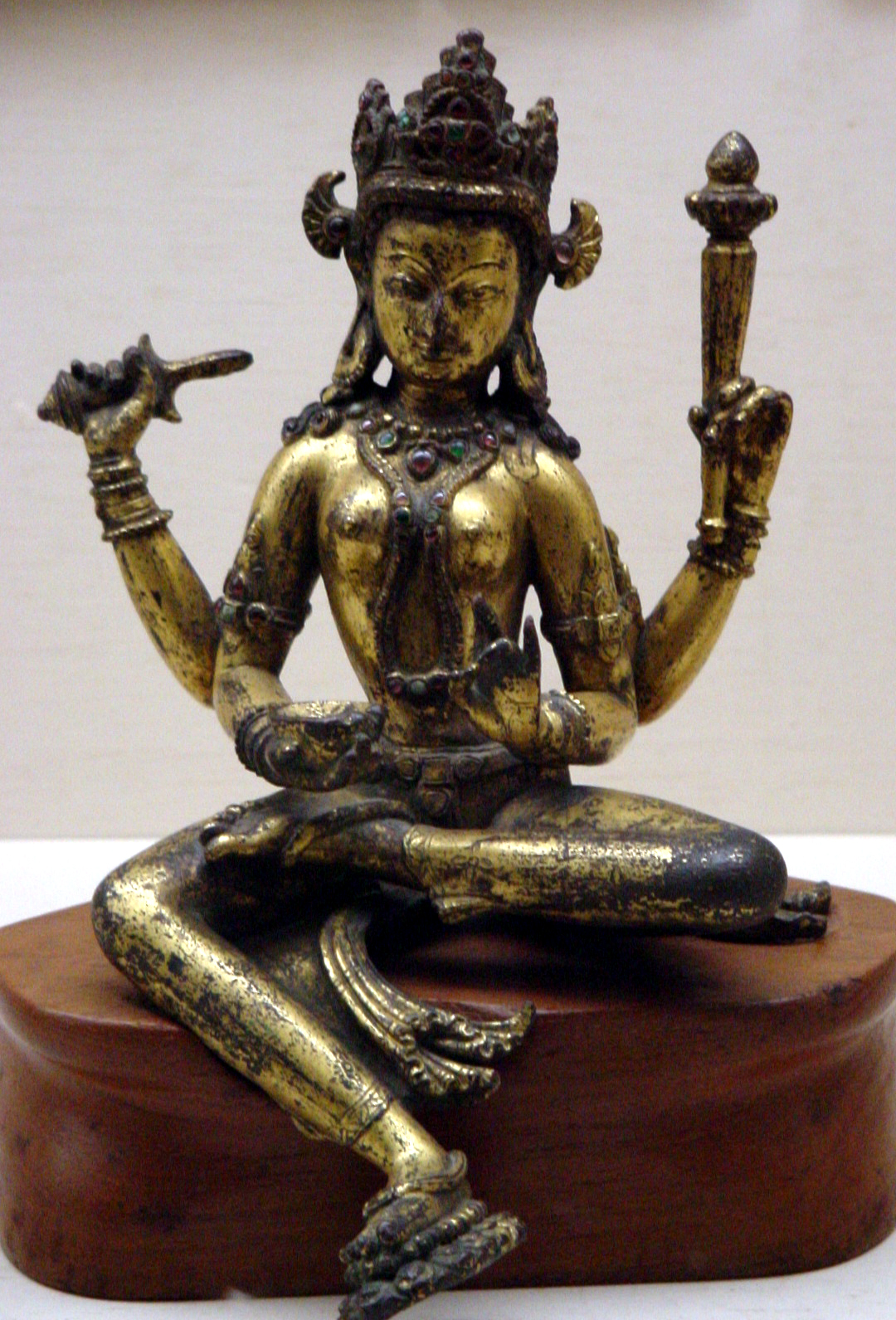
One of the Matrikas, Nepal, gilt-bronze, 14th century. The pendent foot "rests" on a small lotus throne, itself unsupported.

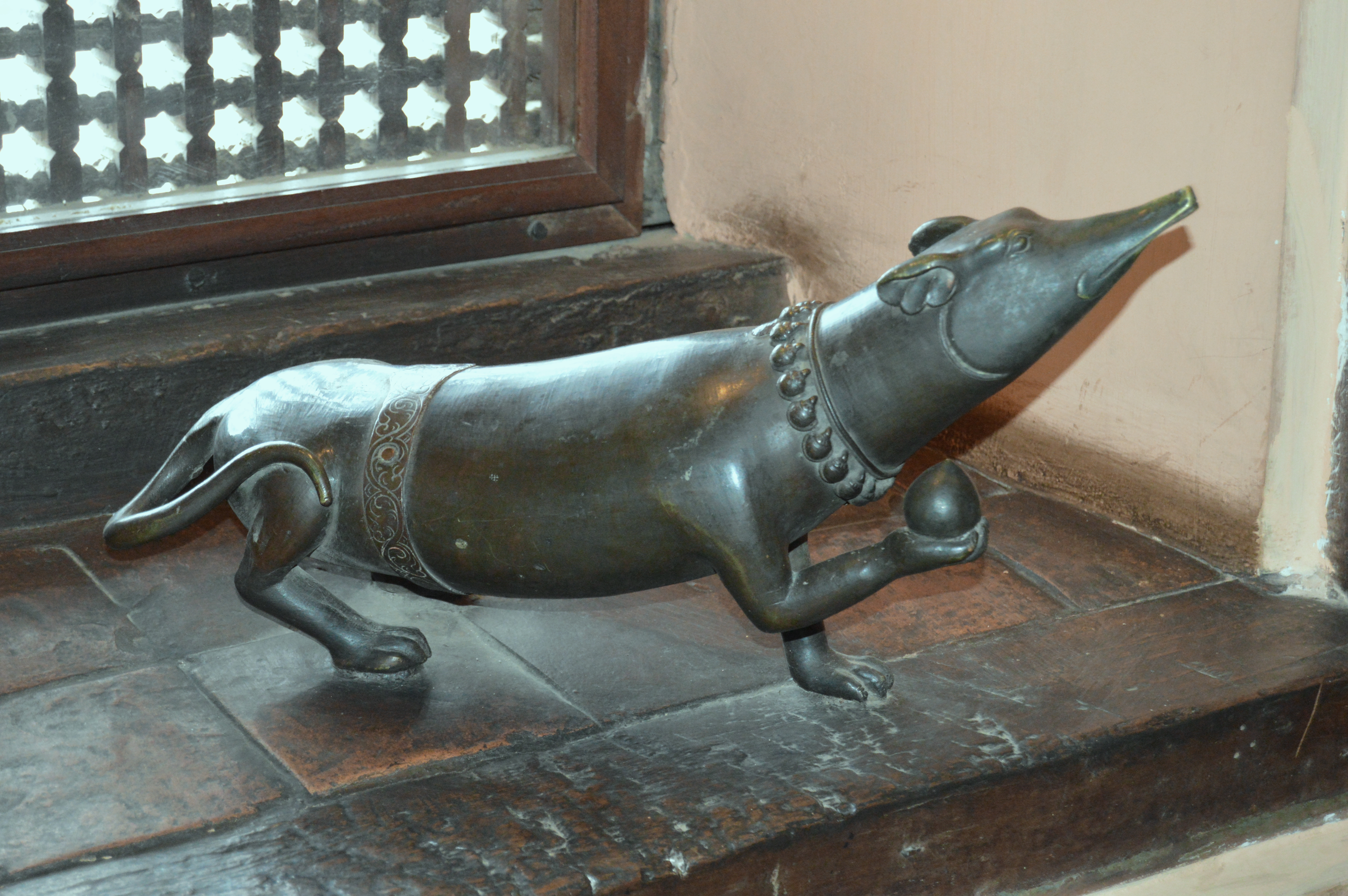
Bronze rat (vehicle for Ganesha), Patan Museum

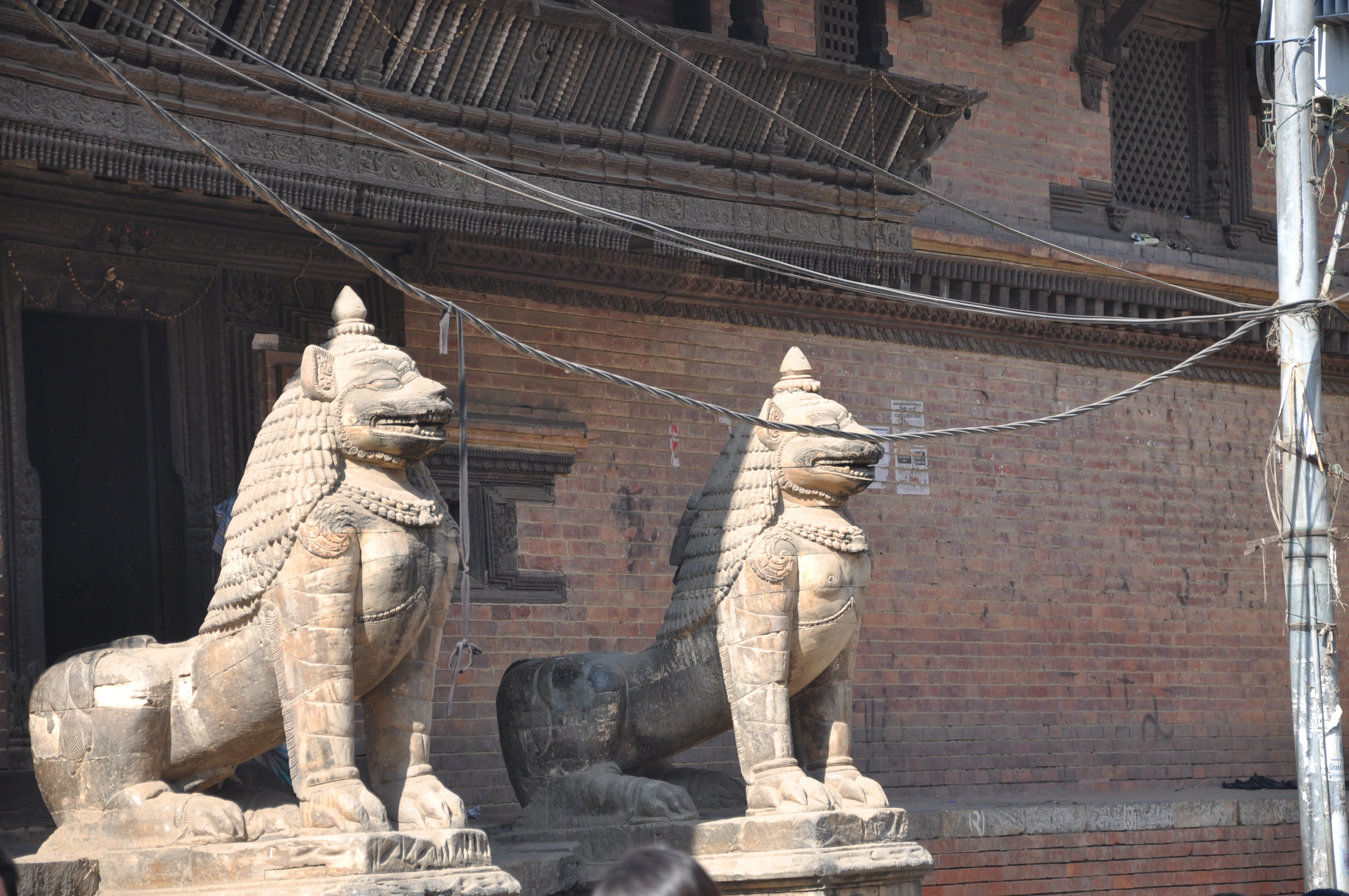
Guardian lions, Mani Keshar Chowk, Patan

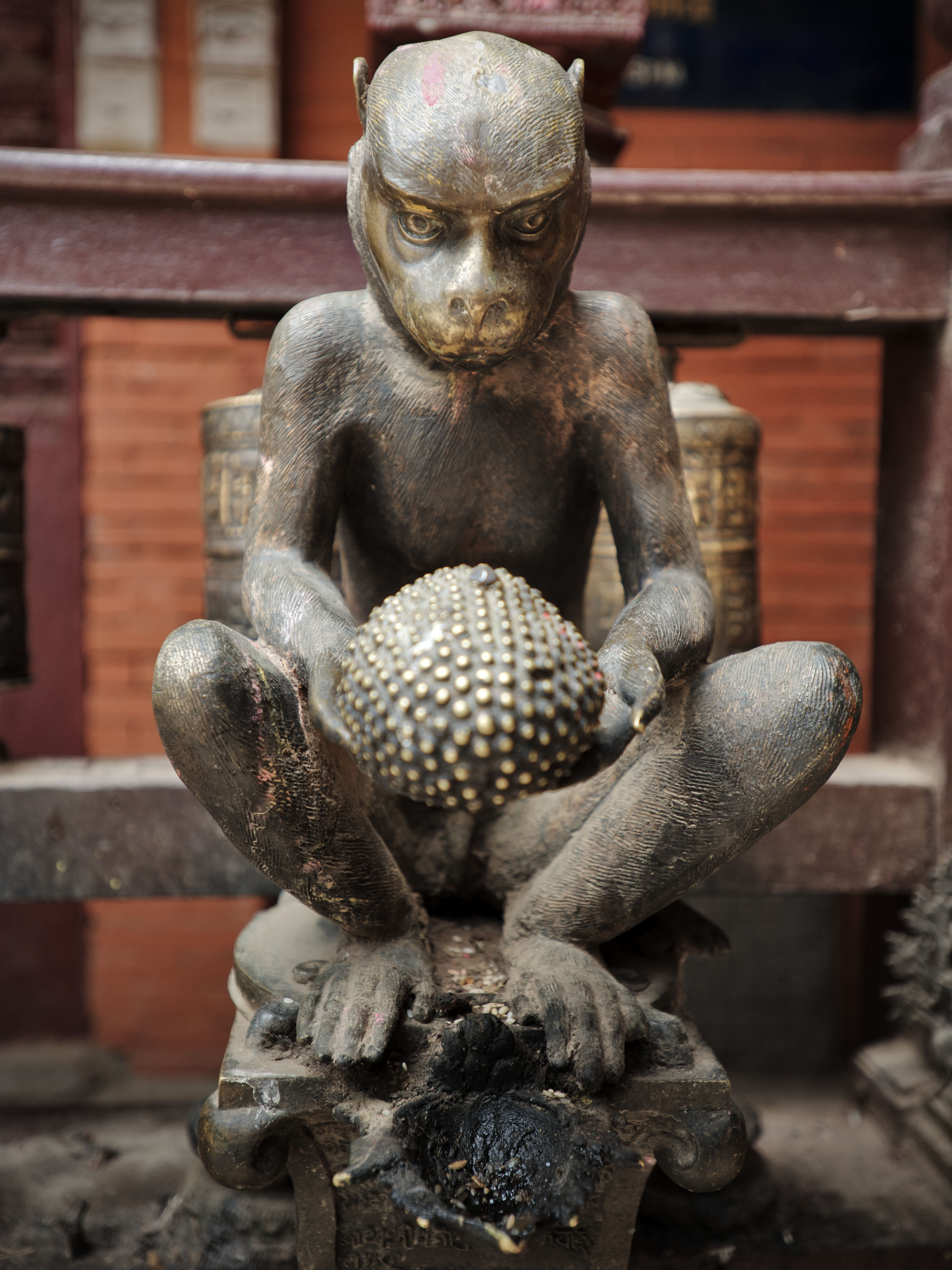
Monkey, Hiranyabarna Mahavihar, Patan

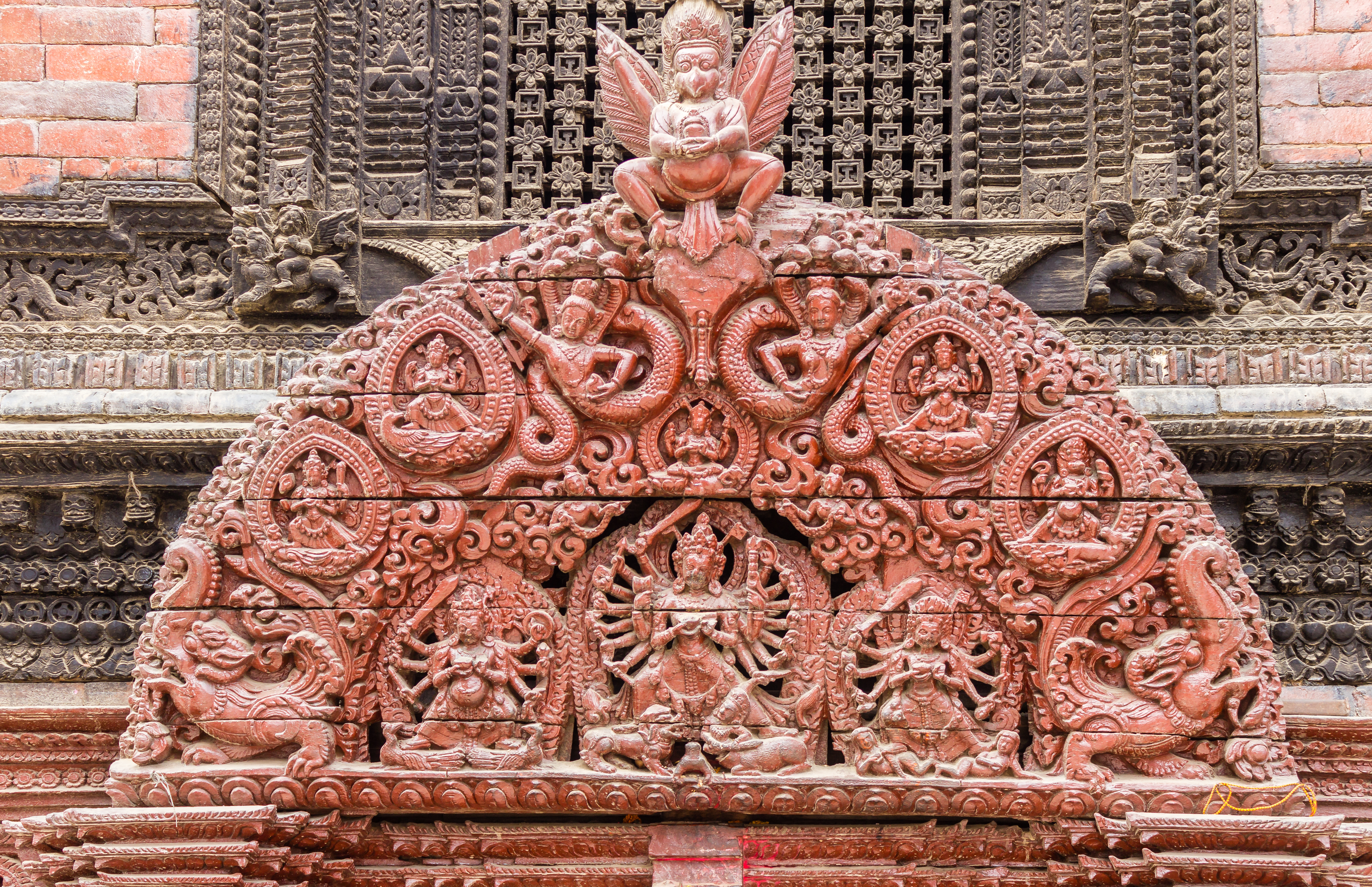
Wooden tympanum at entrance of Kumari House- Basantapur, Kathmandu

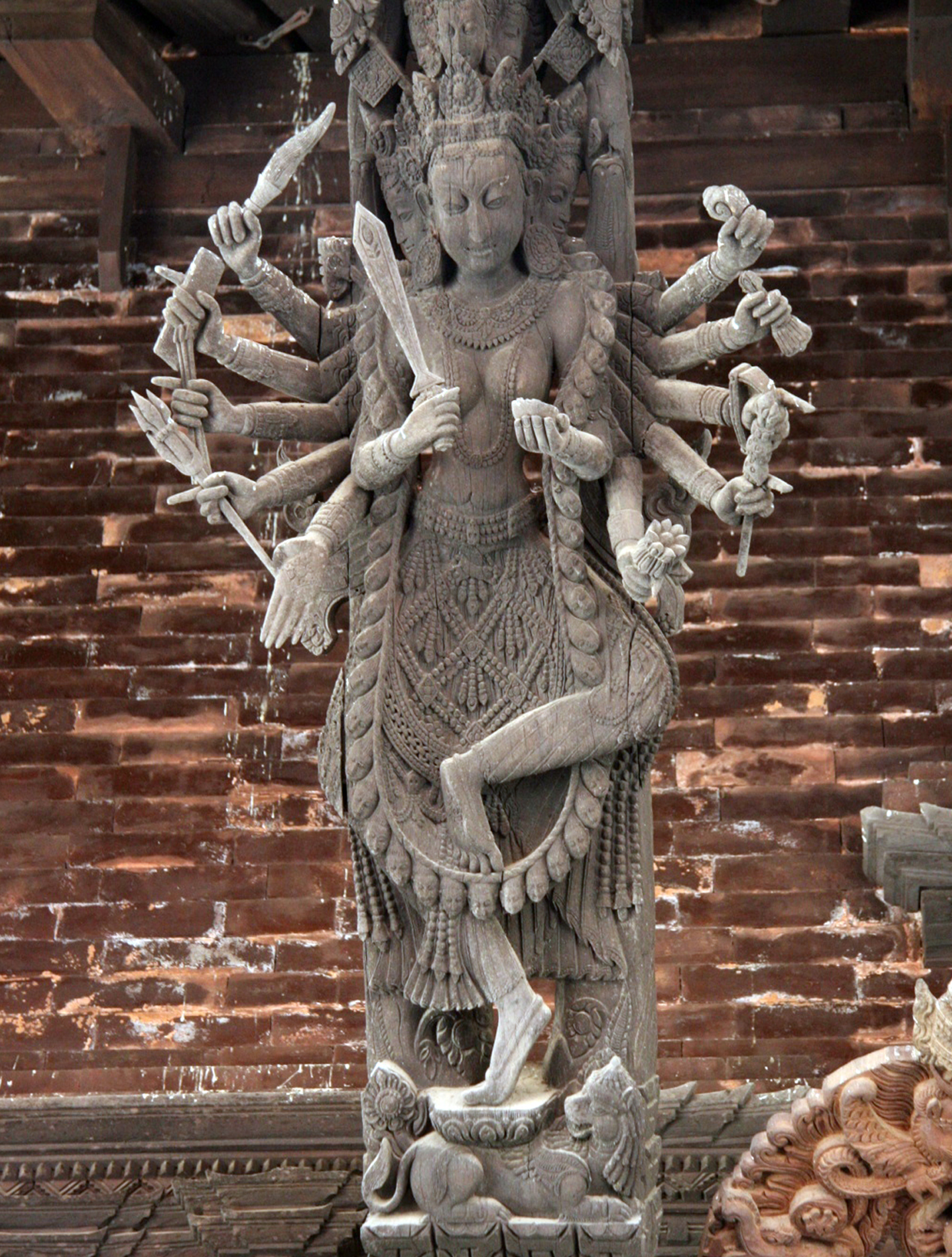
Wood carved roof decoration on the Chandeshwari Temple

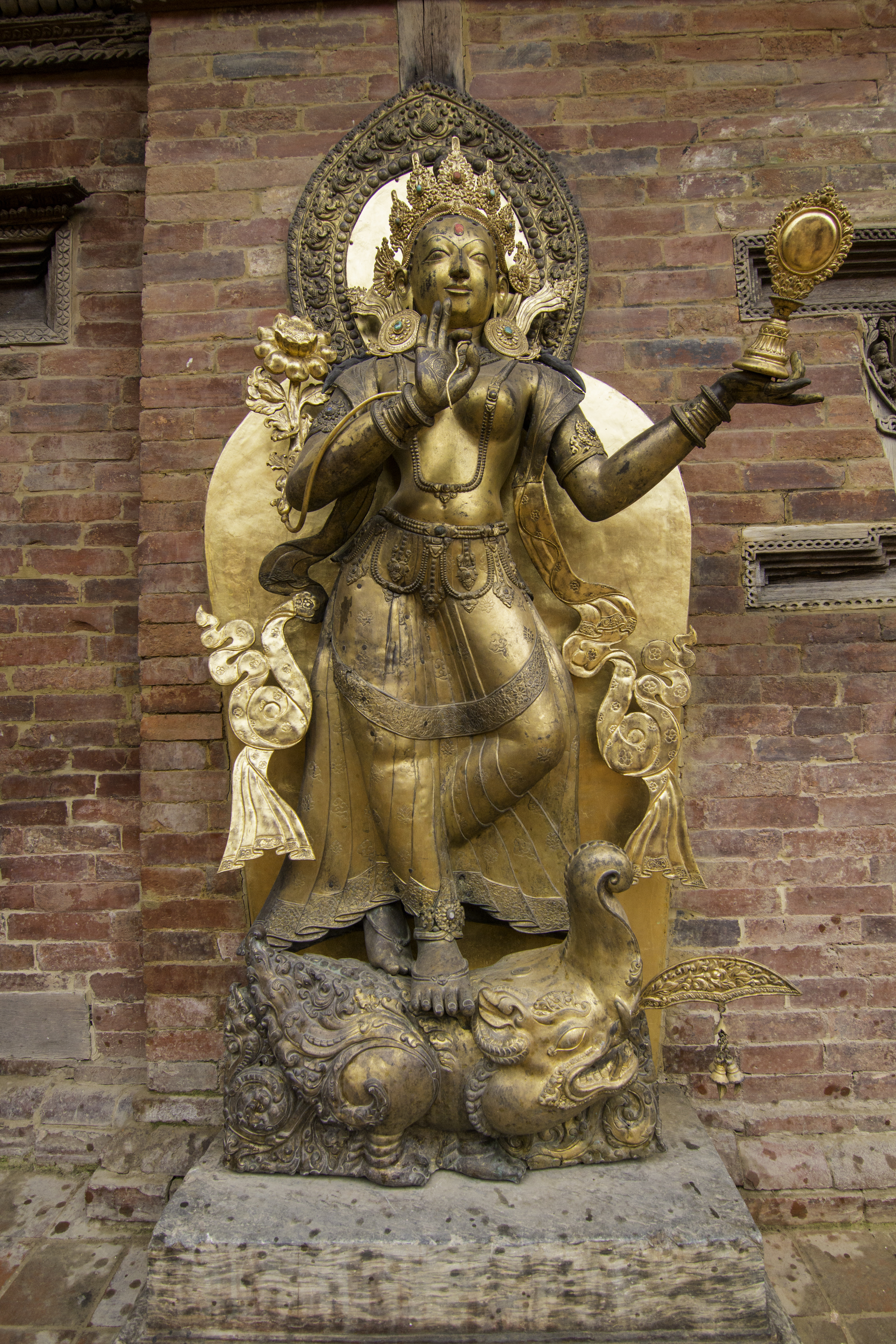
The Goddess Ganga, Patan, Durbar Square

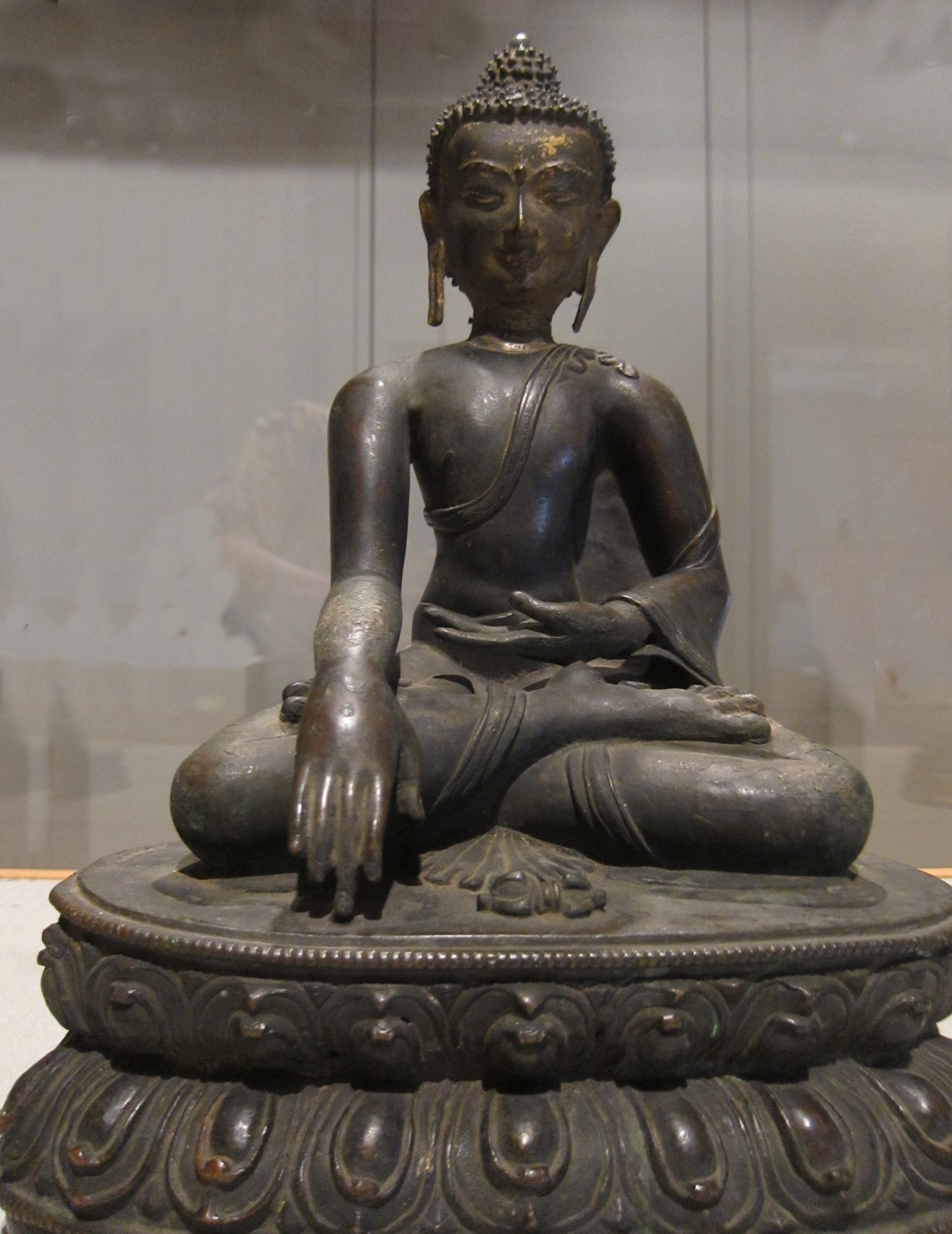
Seated Buddha, 17th century

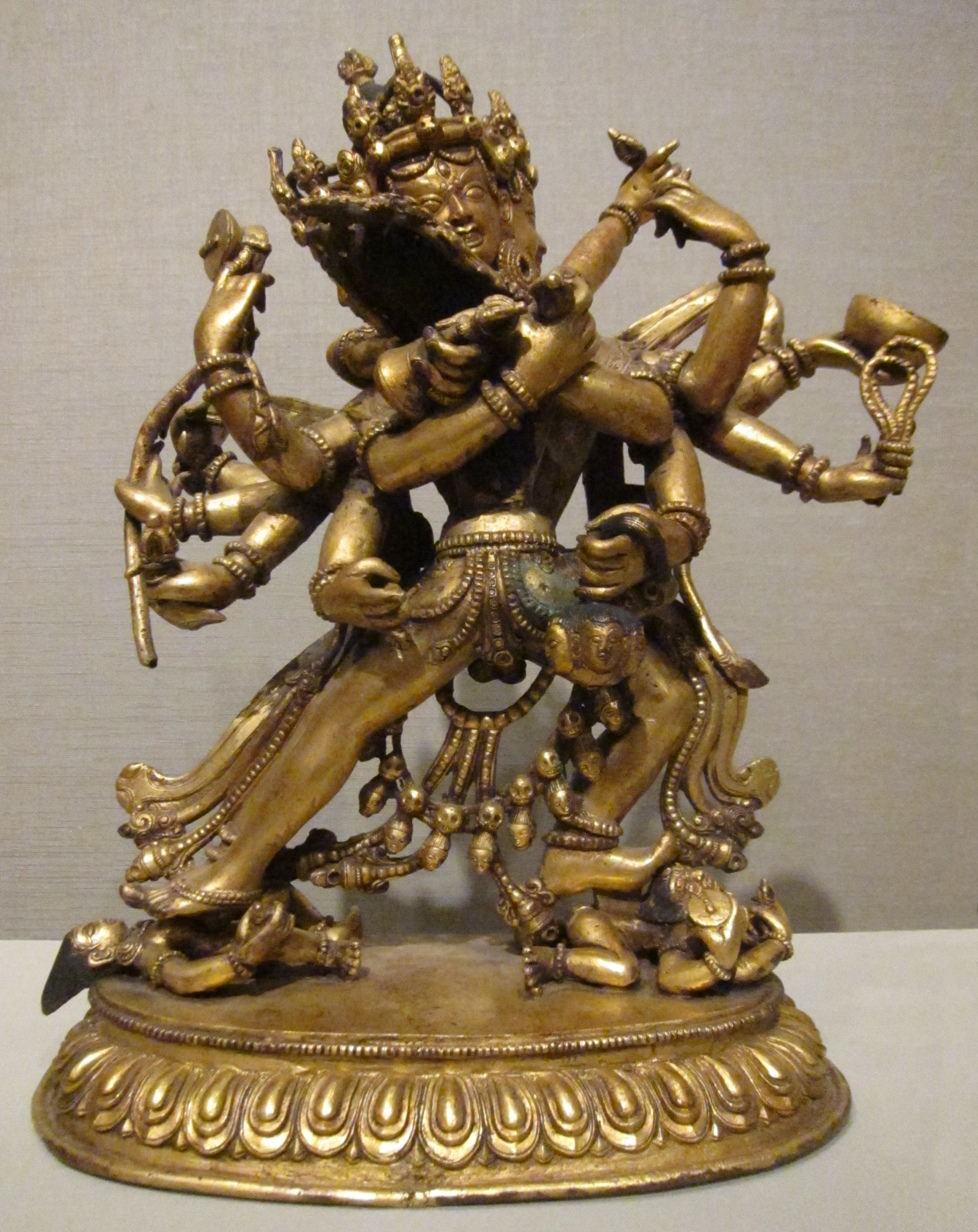
Hevajra statue, 19th century, gilt bronze

The goddess Durga slaying Mahishasura, 14th century
