= Ragini Upadhyaya =

Nepalese painting artist

- रागिनी उपाध्याय
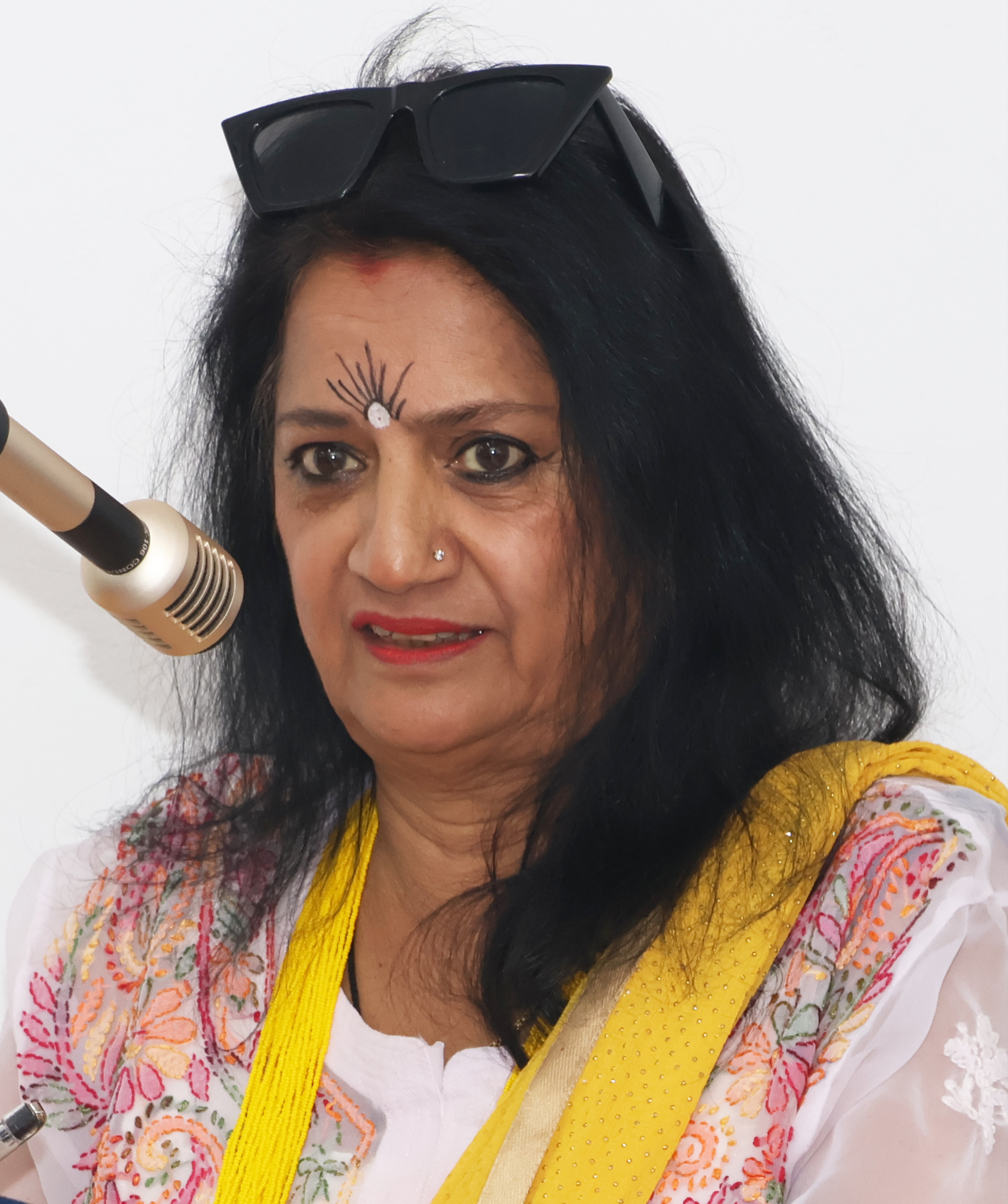
- Born: 9 November 1959 (age 66); Kathmandu, Nepal
- Other name: Ragini Upadhyaya Grela
- Education: Bachelor in Fine Arts
- Alma mater: Lucknow College of Arts
- Occupations: Fine Art, philanthropy
- Years active: 1979–present
- Organization: Nepal Academy of Fine Arts
- Notable work: An Apple in a Pig's Mouth
- Title: Former Chancellor
- Term: 2014–2018
- Spouse: Albert Grela
- Children: 1
- Parents: Kantaprasad Upadhyaya (Father); Sushila Upadhyaya (Mother)
- Awards: Birendra-Aishwarya Memorial Medal (2002, Nepal)
- Website: Official website

Ragini Upadhyaya Grela (also spelled as Ragini Upadhyay Grela) (born 9 November 1959), popularly known as Ragini Upadhyaya, is a Nepalese fine artist, lyricist, and philanthropist. She served as the First Female Chancellor of the Nepal Academy of Fine Art (2014-2018). She is known for her fusion of traditional mythology, symbolism, and modernism in her surrealist and abstract paintings. Her art often features social commentary and feminist or matriarchal themes.

Major influences on Upadhyaya's art style include Salvador Dalí, Vincent van Gogh and George Segal. She has received numerous national and international awards and honors. She is a board member of the B.P Koirala India-Nepal Foundation and the Barbara Foundation. She is also the chairperson and founder for the Shivata Love Foundation, an organization with which she engaged in social work through an education program for low-income families, particularly children, women, and minorities. This foundation also raises awareness of meningitis.

== Childhood ==
She was born to a Brahmin family as the forth child to father Kamta Prasad and mother Sushila Upadhayay in Kathmandu. She spent most of her childhood in Bettiah, India.

Her ancestors lived in Chundi Ramgha, Tanahun District, but her grandfather, Pandit Devi Prasad Upadhyaya, moved to Ramnagar in search of better educational opportunities for his children. Ramnagar was formerly part of Nepal before the Sugauli Treaty was signed, which transferred the territory to India. Some members of her extended family still live in Varanasi, India.

== Education ==
Her formal education began when her family enrolled in a Catholic school in Bettiah, India, at an early age, at a time when the traditional Nepali society did not allow girls to receive an education.

After completing her primary education, Ragini attended the Crosthwaite Girls College in Allahabad. She then enrolled at the Lucknow College of Arts and Crafts in Lucknow, India, where she completed her bachelor's degree in Fine Arts in 1982. Despite her family's disapproval, Ragini studied printing for three years at Gadhi Art Village in New Delhi.

After returning to Nepal in 1986, Ragini took advanced lessons in printmaking in the Oxford Printmakers Co-operative in 1987 on a British Council scholarship. In 1989, she received a scholarship to study at the Kunst Academy in Stuttgart, Germany.

== Career ==
In 1979, Bishweshwar Prasad Koirala and Bal Krishna Sama attended Ragini's non-profit exhibition of her paintings. This event brought considerable attention to her work and marked her entrance into the progressive circles in Nepal.

Ragini rose to further prominence at the inauguration of her exhibition by Queen Aishwarya Shah on the birth anniversary of King Birendra in 1986. This led her to receive a scholarship to study in England, with encouragement and support from her husband to enter the field.

Intending to establish a modern and well-equipped fine arts museum in Nepal, she was appointed the first woman Chancellor of the Nepal Academy of Fine Arts in 2014, by Sushil Koirala, the Prime Minister of Nepal.

With help and encouragement from her father, Ragini established herself in the field of fine arts. She has produced more than 65 solo exhibitions, with the first in 1979, and dozens of group exhibitions in more than two dozen countries worldwide. Her art has been received positively by others like Lain Singh Bandel, Bal Krishna Sama, BP Koirala, and Abhi Subedi.

== Philanthropy ==
Ragini is the chairperson of the Shivata Love Foundation, which she founded in 2017 in the memory of her eponymous late daughter, Shivata Upadhayay Grela, who died from meningitis B in February 2016 at the age of 20.

The foundation aims to raise awareness for the meningitis B vaccine, as well as to promote the education of underprivileged girls in Nepal through scholarships.

== Professions ==
- Former Chancellor – Nepal Academy of Fine Arts
- Member – BP Koirala India-Nepal Foundation
- Member – Barbara Foundation
- Director – Artist Proof Gallery, Nepal
- Founder President – Women Artists Group Nepal
- Founder President – Shivata Love Foundation
- Founder President – Ragini Upadhyaya Art Foundation

== Medals and awards ==
- National Exhibition Award, 1979, Nepal
- National Exhibition Award, 1985, Nepal
- National Exhibition Award, 1988, Nepal
- Kate & Robert Wilson Award, 1986, Bradford, UK
- Birendra-Aishwarya Memorial Medal, 2002, Nepal
- 50 Talented Women of Nepal, 2005, The Bose, Nepal
- Sankalp Honour, Sankalp Nepal Welfare Society, Nepal
- 'Best Student Award in 100 Years of Lucknow College of Arts and Crafts', Lucknow, India
- Toran Kumari Art Culture Award, Nepal
- Senior Artist Honor, Nepal Chamber of Commerce Artists Association, Nepal
- Bhadrakumari Seva Sadan Honour, Nepal
- Consensus Respect for Social Work, Nepal
- Honorary Life Member, Art Circle, U.P. Lucknow, India
- Glapev Honors 2019 Artist of the Year, Bharat Nirman Foundation, India
- Shabdayatra Mahila Pratibha Honour, 2076 BS (2019–2020), Shabdayatra Prakashan, Banepa, Kavrepalanchok
