= Tej Bahadur Chitrakar =

Nepalese artist (1898–1971)

- Tej Bahadur in his early twenties
- Born: 1898; Haugal, Lalitpur District, Nepal
- Died: 1971 (aged 72–73); Tanlacchi, Kathmandu, Nepal
- Spouse(s): Krishna Maya Chitrakar (m.1918 – death.1936); Mana Keshari Chitrakar (m.1940 until death

Tej Bahadur Chitrakar (Devanagari: तेज बहादुर चित्रकार; 1898–1971) was a Nepalese artist who had a prolific artistic career in the early 20th century. He was one of the leaders in the development of contemporary art in Nepal in the early 20th century. Chitrakar spearheaded the trend of creating art using new techniques for its aesthetic value, and introduced a new style in the milieu of traditional art which is essentially religious and follows descriptions laid down in ancient texts.

== Personal ==
Tej Bahadur was born in Lalitpur as a second son to Shivadas and Ashamati in the chitrakar caste of Newar community. The caste chitrakar were traditionally entrusted by the state or the Malla ruler as sole custodian of tradition of religious paintings in the valley since 14th century AD. The extraordinary family background and his own talent since his early childhood led him to the Government college of Fine Art in 1918 at Calcutta (now Kolkata) as one of the earliest Nepali to receive the degree in Fine Art with distinction in portraiture in Oil in 1927. His education was sponsored by the then prime minister Chandra Shumsher. He returned to Nepal in 1929 AD.

He heralded a change in Nepalese art scene from traditional religious art to modern Western-style paintings. He also began teaching art at Durbar High School and later became head of Juddha Art School.

He initiated 'Chitrakala Udhyog Sangh' (now defunct) to promote Nepali art. Many of his enduring paintings today are in the collection of prestigious Art galleries worldwide.

== Honors ==
In 2009, the Postal Services Department, Government of Nepal issued a commemorative postage stamp (Denomination – Rs. 15) depicting a portrait of Tej Bahadur Chitrakar to honor his contribution to the development of art in Nepal.

First Day cover of stamps commemorating Tej Bahadur Chitrakar's contributions
