= Park Gallery =

- Established: 1970
- Location: Pulchowk, Patan, Nepal
- Coordinates: 27.675447°N 85.315975°E
- Type: Art gallery
- Website: www.parkgallery.com.np

Park Gallery is an artist-run space which is located in Patan, Nepal. It was founded by Rama Nanda Joshi, artist, art teacher and art activist in 1970. The establishment of Park Gallery was an event of a historical importance in Nepal — the first school that taught modern art and a modern art gallery — an institution committed to the ideals of promoting the principles of modern art in Nepal.

== RN Joshi and Park Gallery ==
After returning from his training at Bombay’s JJ School of Arts under an Indian government Scholarship, Joshi witnessed a gradual modernization in Nepal. Ratna Park — one of the most popular places in the Kathmandu Valley at that time, was also fast turning into a hub for many —it was a meeting point for many intellectuals and the artists of the country then. This was where he started the gallery. Later in 1975, Joshi moved the gallery to Pulchowk closer to his home – as it stands today. After his untimely demise in 1988, his family who are currently active in the field of art, have remained committed to carry his legacy to the future and keep his principles and his visions alive. In 2006, it was renovated to provide a completely new contemporary look, a miniature museum dedicated to Joshi which displays some of his artworks was set up and Park Gallery was expanded. This was collectively called R.N Joshi Center for Fine Art.

== Activities ==
Park Gallery served as a learning institution for many leading Nepali artists, including Kiran Manandhar, Surendra Pradhan, Jeevan, Sangeeta Thapa, Chanda Shrestha and Ramesh Nath Khanal who were students of R.N. Joshi. The Gallery has organized many art exhibitions of local and foreign artists who helped develop the contemporary art scene in Nepal since it was established. Besides being a venue for exhibitions, The gallery organizes art talks and art seminars. It also has a shop that sells greeting cards, posters and prints and offers customers the service to frame their artwork as well. It encourages the budding artists of Nepal to get more involved in the art scene of Nepal. Due to the variety of the nature of exhibitions held at the gallery, it attracts a lot of attention from art enthusiasts as well as expats. It also has a collection of artworks from several Nepali artists as well as foreign artists.
