= Sita Bhawan =

Coordinates: 27.4243°N 85.1910°E

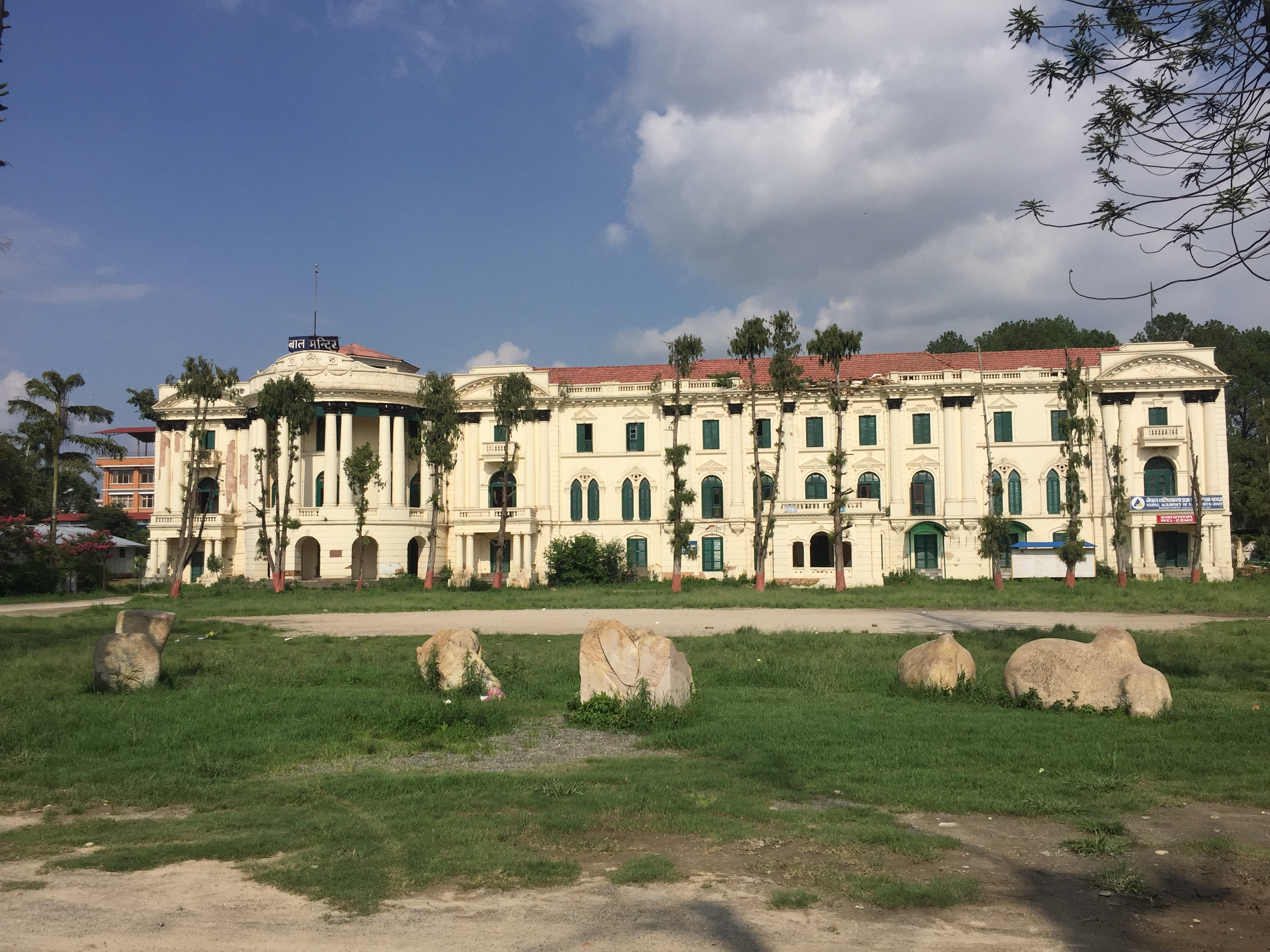
- Interactive map of the Sita Bhawan area

General information
- Architectural style: Fusion of Neoclassical architecture, European styles of architecture
- Location: Kathmandu, Nepal
- Construction started: 1918
- Completed: 1929; 97 years ago
- Cost: Unknown
- Client: Bhim Shamsher Jang Bahadur Rana

Technical details
- Structural system: Brick and Mortar
- Size: 300 ropanis

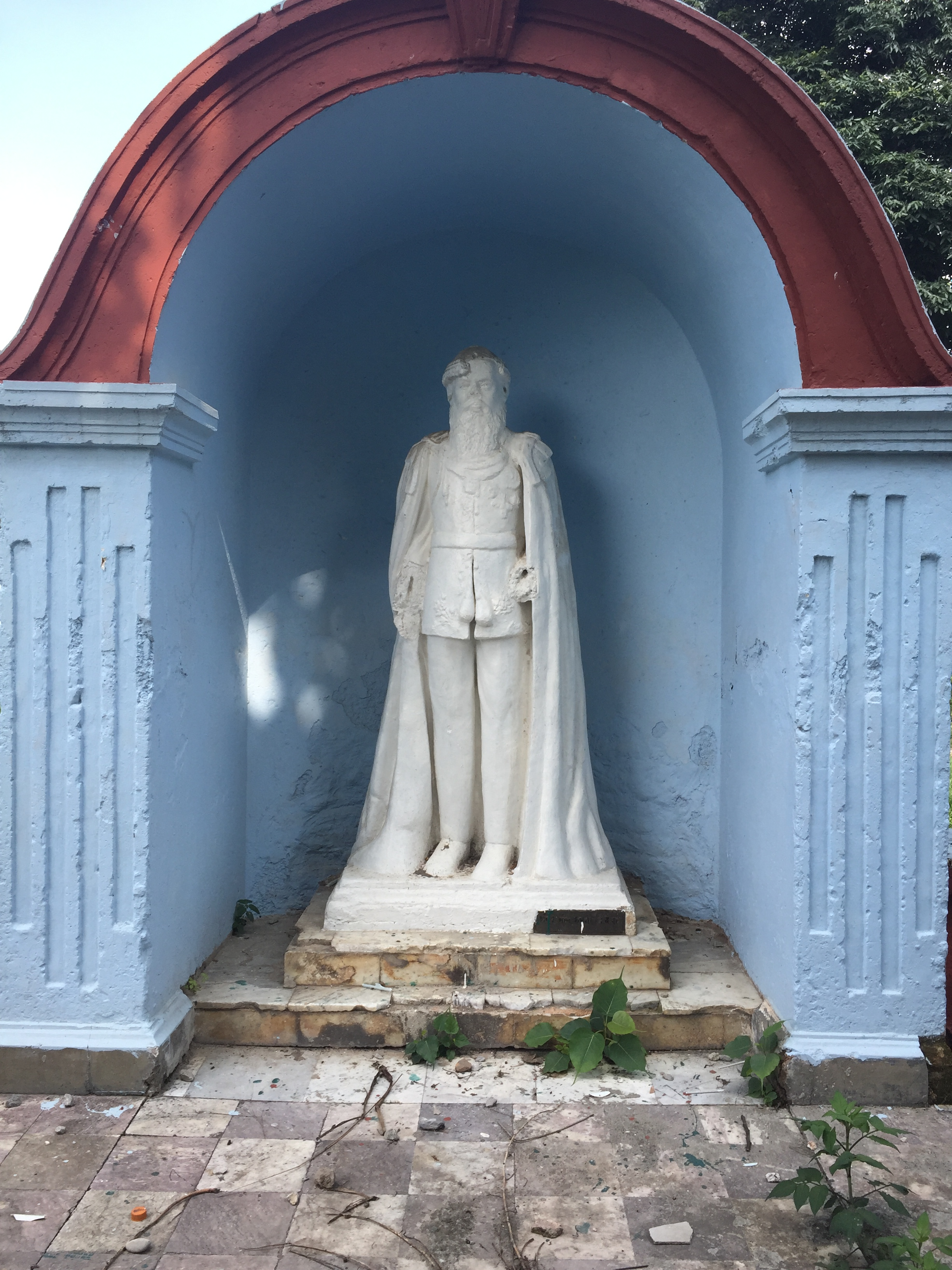
Statue of Prime Minister Bhim Shamsher Jang Bahadur Rana at Tangal Durbar.

Sita Bhawan is a Rana palace in Kathmandu, the capital of Nepal. The palace complex, located east of the Narayanhity Palace, was incorporated in an impressive and vast array of courtyards, gardens and buildings. Sita Bhawan was built by Bhim Shamsher Jang Bahadur Rana in 1929 for his wife, Her Highness Sri Teen Sita Bada Maharani Deela Kumari Devi.

== History ==
Sita Bhawan was built by Bhim Shamsher Jang Bahadur Rana for Her Highness Deela Kumari Devi. She lived in this palace until its nationalisation in 1969.

== Current status ==
Sita Bhawan is largely occupied by, Nepal Children Organization (NCO) and Nepal Academy of Fine Arts (NAFA).

== Earthquake of 2015 ==
A large section of this palace was destroyed by 2015 earthquake. Future of this historic building is unknown.

== Gallery ==
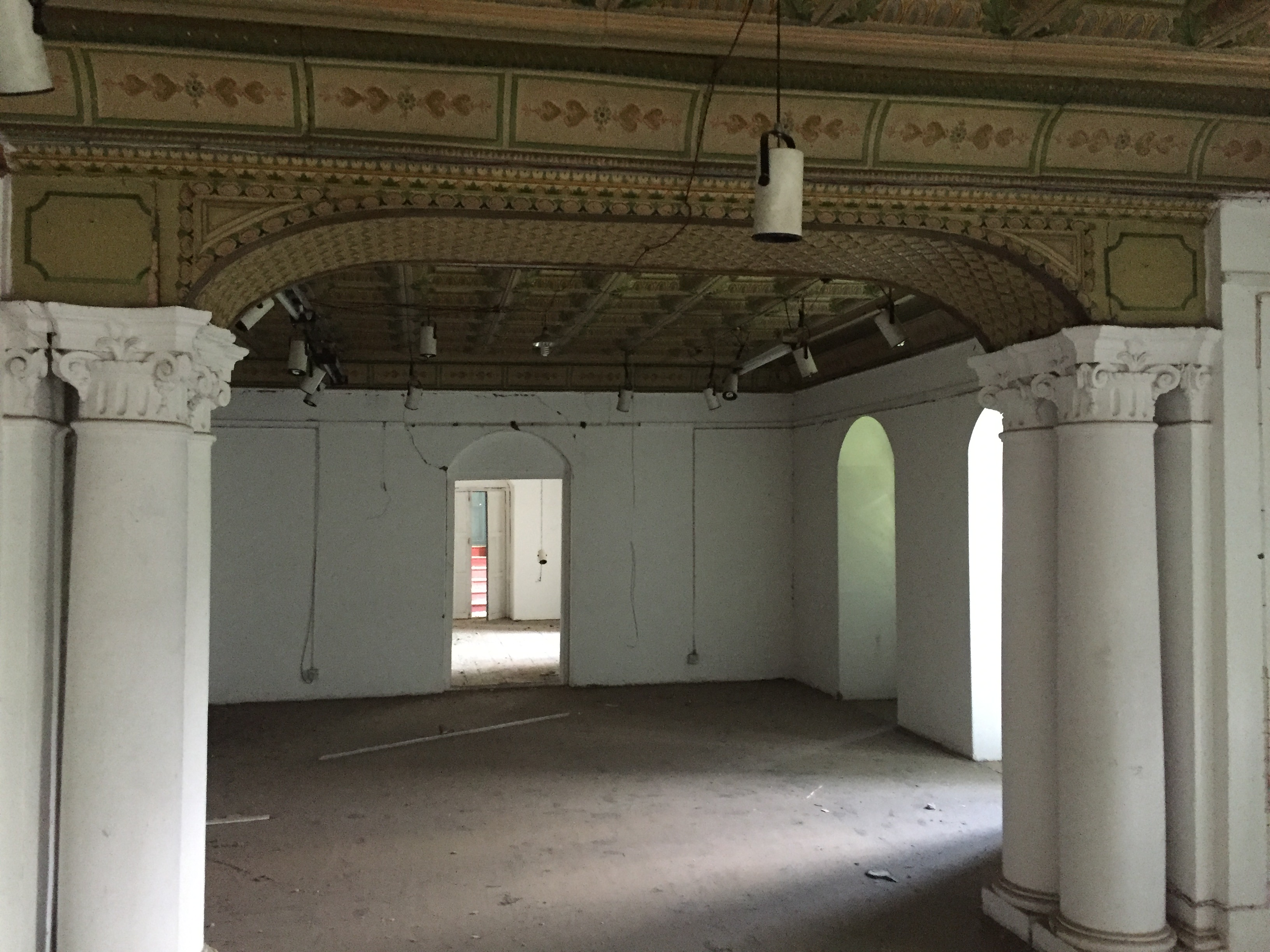
One of the Baithak rooms in Tangal Durbar, Kathmandu, Nepal

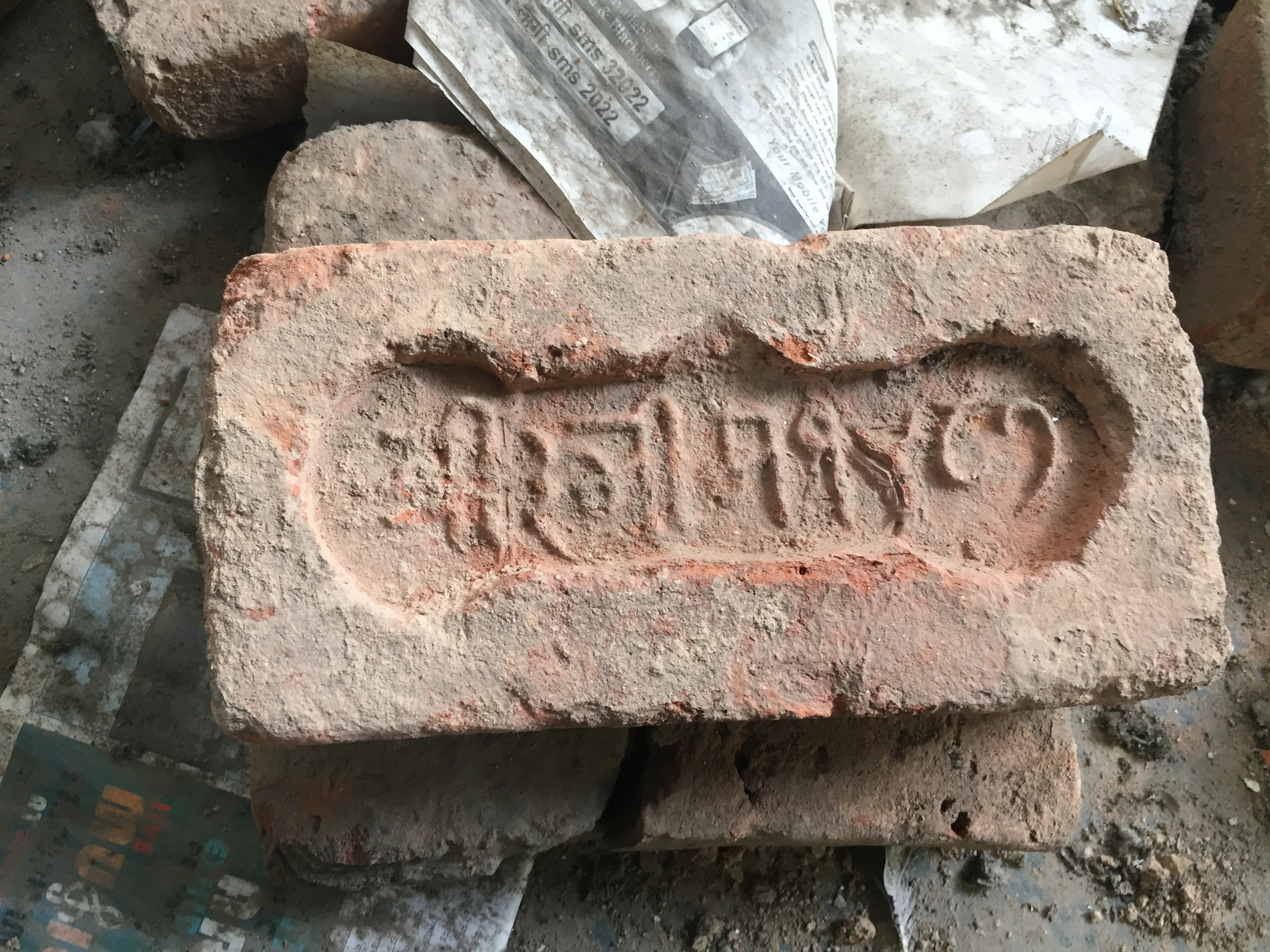
Shree 3 Bhim 1987(BS) Probably the one that is used in later repairs

== See also ==
- Rana palaces of Nepal
- Bagh Durbar
- Lakshmi Niwas
