= Kathmandu Valley Preservation Trust =

- Formation: 1990
- Founders: Eduard F. Sekler, Erich Theophile
- Type: Non-profit
- Headquarters: New York City, United States
- Website: kvptnepal.org

The Kathmandu Valley Preservation Trust (KVPT) is a non-profit organization dedicated to safeguarding the architectural heritage of Nepal's Kathmandu Valley. Established in 1990 by architectural historian Eduard F. Sekler and architect Erich Theophile, KVPT has restored and conserved dozens of historic monuments. It played a leading role in recovery efforts following the April 2015 Nepal earthquake. KVPT is registered as a 501(c)(3) organization in the United States and is headquartered in New York City.

== History ==
KVPT was established in 1990 in response to threats to the Kathmandu Valley’s built heritage posed by urbanization, neglect, and natural disaster. Its founders, Eduard F. Sekler, a professor at Harvard University, and Erich Theophile, an American architect working in Nepal since 1987, aimed to protect endangered monuments through active restoration and international collaboration.

The organization’s initial "Band-Aid Fund" campaign (1991–1996) stabilized over a dozen monuments in Patan. KVPT’s methodology emphasized the use of original materials, traditional craftsmanship, and historical accuracy. In 1999, the Kathmandu Darbar Initiative launched with support from the World Monuments Fund and local industry, targeting ten structures within the Kathmandu World Heritage Site.

In 2000, KVPT began conservation at Itum Baha, one of the oldest Buddhist monasteries in Kathmandu, which had been placed on the World Monuments Watch list. In 2014, the Trust also supported the opening of the Architecture Galleries at the Patan Museum.

Following the 2015 earthquake, KVPT coordinated emergency response and reconstruction for numerous historic buildings, including the Krishna Mandir and Char Narayan Temple in Patan. Its continued work has received international recognition for seismic strengthening methods and commitment to cultural authenticity.

== Mission and Objectives ==
KVPT’s mission is to preserve and restore historic structures in the Kathmandu Valley. Its core objectives include:

- Restoring temples, monasteries, and palaces of historic significance
- Promoting traditional Newar craftsmanship and building techniques
- Collaborating with local and international institutions
- Documenting threatened structures and training artisans

== Projects ==
=== Patan Durbar Square ===
Since the early 1990s, KVPT has led conservation work at Patan Durbar Square, a UNESCO World Heritage Site. Over 30 monuments have been restored, including Krishna Mandir, Bhimsen Temple, and Sundari Chowk.

=== Post-2015 Earthquake Work ===
After the 2015 earthquake, KVPT conducted damage assessments and stabilization, then led long-term rebuilding at sites like the Hari Shankar and Char Narayan temples. The Char Narayan reconstruction used salvaged original elements and integrated seismic retrofitting.

=== Kathmandu Darbar Initiative ===
Between 2002 and 2005, KVPT, with support from the World Monuments Fund, implemented the Kathmandu Darbar Initiative, focusing on architectural preservation and the development of earthquake-resistant techniques.

=== Itum Baha and Other Monasteries ===
Itum Baha, a 650-year-old monastery, became the site of in-depth research, training, and restoration beginning in 2000. KVPT also documented dozens of endangered religious and civic sites across the Valley.

== Methodology ==
KVPT employs a conservation philosophy grounded in minimal intervention and the reuse of original materials. Its work integrates traditional craftsmanship with modern seismic strengthening techniques, often referred to as "concealed retrofitting." These methods are recognized by ICOMOS and UNESCO for their integrity and cultural sensitivity.

== Collaborations and Funding ==
KVPT collaborates with the Department of Archaeology (Nepal), UNESCO, the Getty Foundation, the World Monuments Fund, and Harvard University. It receives funding from private donors, international foundations, and governments, including The Prince’s Charities, the Getty Foundation, and the U.S. Ambassadors Fund for Cultural Preservation.

== Leadership ==
KVPT is directed by co-founder Erich Theophile and Nepal Program Director Rohit Ranjitkar. Both have led the Trust’s strategic and field-level operations since its inception.

== Notable Contributors ==
=== Eduard F. Sekler ===
Eduard F. Sekler (1920–2017) was a professor of architectural history at Harvard and a UNESCO consultant in South Asia. He remained KVPT’s senior adviser until his death.

=== Niels Gutschow ===
Niels Gutschow is a German historian and KVPT collaborator known for his scholarship on Nepalese religious and civic architecture, including The Nepalese Caitya and Architecture of the Newars.

== Educational Initiatives ==
KVPT established the KVPT Archive at Harvard University’s Frances Loeb Library. The archive houses documentation, drawings, and photographs from three decades of KVPT’s work.

== Recognition ==
KVPT has received multiple UNESCO Asia-Pacific Awards for Cultural Heritage Conservation for its restoration projects. Its work has also been cited by the World Monuments Fund, ICOMOS, and national cultural agencies.

== See also ==
- Kathmandu Valley
- Patan Durbar Square
- 2015 Nepal earthquake
- Newar architecture
