= Taragaon Museum =

- तारागाउँ सङ्ग्रहालय

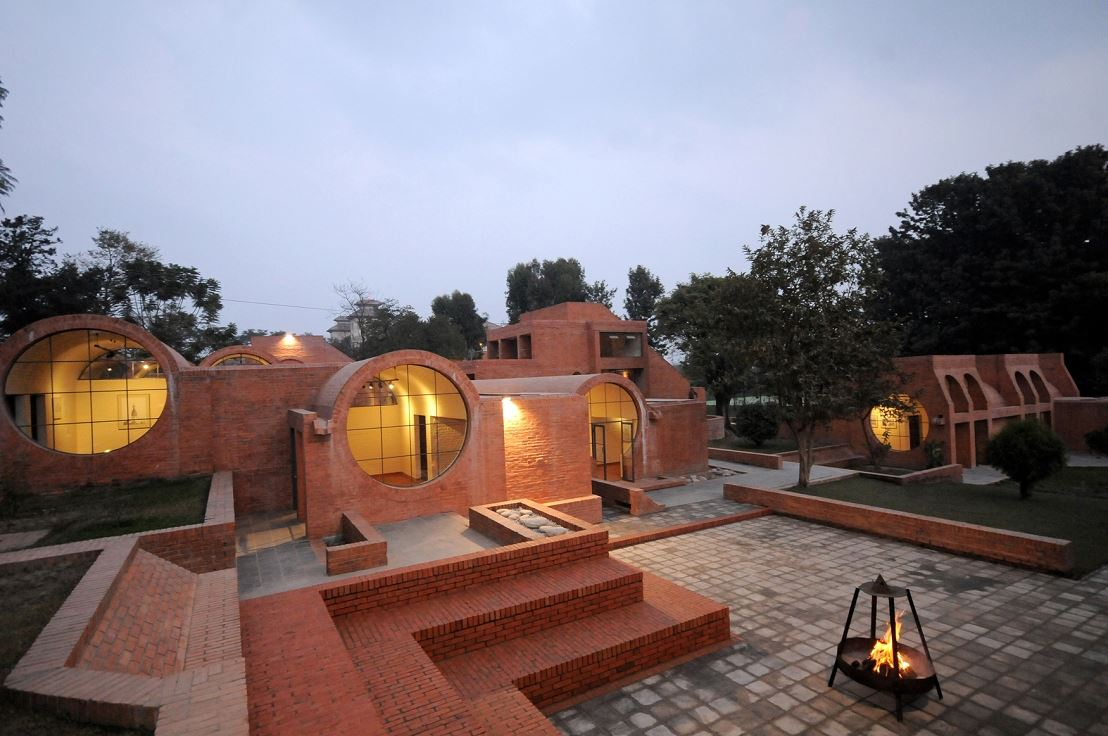
- The pod-style structure of buildings were originally a hostel for artists, writers and scholars
- Established: 2014; 12 years ago
- Location: Boudha, Kathmandu, Nepal
- Coordinates: 27.72048054°N 85.356247°E
- Type: Art museum
- Director: Roshan Mishra
- Curator: Niels Gutschow
- Architect: Carl Pruscha
- Owner: Taragaon Regency Hotel
- Website: taragaonmuseum.com

Taragaon Next, formerly Taragaon Museum, is a private gallery located in Kathmandu. It is located in the northern part of the city near the Bouddhanath stupa. It is situated on the ground of the Taragaon Regency hotel, which owns the museum. The gallery is supported by the Saraf Foundation.

== History ==
The Austrian-style brick structure was built as a hostel for artists and scientist in 1970s. Nepal started permitting foreign visitors in 1950s. The hostel was built to reflect the "Nepaliness" to the visitors. The land in which the hostel stands was acquired by His Majesty's Government in 1969. The land was transferred to the Nepal Women's Association. In 1970, Angur Baba Joshi, a prominent Nepalese scholar met Austrian architect Carl Pruscha, who served as a UN and UNESCO consultant to the Nepalese government. She then commissioned him to design the hostel. Joshi wanted to create a cultural village for artists in Nepal. The construction began in 1974 and the entire complex was inaugurated on the 25 September 1974, in the presence of Queen Aishwarya Rajya Lakshmi Devi Shah. The style of the structure is a combination of Nepalese and Pruscha's European modernist architecture.

In 1990 the Nepal Women's Association was abolished after the restoration of democracy in Nepal. In 1997, the hostel was abandoned. The property was later acquired by Arun Saraf, the owner of the adjacent Hyatt hotel. It was then renovated into a museum.

== Exhibits ==
The museum covers an area of 35,000 sq. feet. The museum exhibits 18th and 19th century photographs, watercolors and engravings, artist sketches, maps, plans, drawings and various other documentations in its permanent collection. Besides its permanent collection, the museum also has a contemporary art gallery, event hall and two outdoor amphitheaters.

== Events ==
The museum host various art related events and festivals. The museum campus is also used for book release events and musical performance. The museum was one of the host of Kathmandu Triennale 2077 alongside the Patan Museum, Bahadur Shah Baithak, Nepal Art Council and Siddhartha Art Gallery.

== See also ==
- Nepal Academy of Fine Arts
- Nepal Art Council
- Park Gallery
