= Albert Szabo =

American architect

- Born: November 7, 1925; Brooklyn, New York, U.S.
- Died: December 17, 2003 (aged 78); Cambridge, Massachusetts, U.S.
- Known for: Architecture, indigenous architecture, design

Albert Szabo (1925-2003) was an American architect, educator and artist. He was born in Brooklyn, New York on November 7, 1925, to Benjamin Szabo of Felso Viso, Hungary (1885–1964) and Jeanette Szabo (née Margolies) of New York, New York (1895–1980). Szabo was a tenured professor of architecture at the Harvard Graduate School of Design (GSD) and at the Department of Visual and Environmental Studies (VES), Carpenter Center for the Visual Arts. He co-founded the latter, together with Eduard Sekler in 1968. He was author, with his wife, architect Brenda Dyer Szabo (1926–2017), of “Preliminary Notes on the Indigenous Architecture of Afghanistan” (Harvard Graduate School of Design, 1978) and, with anthropologist, Thomas Barfield, of, “Afghanistan: An Atlas of Indigenous Domestic Architecture” (University of Texas Press, 1991). He died in Cambridge, MA on December 17, 2003.

== Biography ==
Albert Szabo was born in Brooklyn, New York in 1925. He studied Science and Fine Arts at Brooklyn College from 1942 to 1947 under the guidance of architect, Serge Chermayeff. There was a break in his education during World War II when he enlisted to join the war effort in 1941 and was called to service (air force) in 1943. He received an honorable discharge as an Aviation Cadet when the war ended in 1945. During his time at Brooklyn College he spent summers as apprentice to Bauhaus architect, Marcel Breuer. He was graduated from Brooklyn College in 1947. Following the advice of Chermayeff, he then moved to Chicago, where he studied at the Chicago Institute of Design (formerly The New Bauhaus)(1947–1948). His involvement at the Chicago Institute of Design led to his first teaching appointment which was also at the Institute of Design. In 1948 he returned to Harvard to earn his degree in Architecture (1952) at the Harvard Graduate School of Design, then chaired by Walter Gropius, founder of the Bauhaus in Germany. In 1954 he was invited to join the faculty at the Harvard Graduate School of Design, where he taught for 42 years.

From 1974 to 1976 he was a lecturer for the Fulbright Program in Architecture at Kabul University, Afghanistan. While there, he studied the country's indigenous architecture, which led to the publication in 1991 of the book, “Afghanistan: An Atlas of Indigenous Domestic Architecture”, named an outstanding academic book by the American Library Association.

His experiences in the Middle East also led him in 1979 to create a seminar on indigenous architecture, the first of its kind at the Harvard Graduate School of Design. Teaching the class helped him to further develop his theories regarding the relationship between culture, climate, and context as basic to the evolution of form and purpose in indigenous and contemporary architecture. In addition to teaching, Szabo maintained an architectural practice with his wife, Brenda Dyer Szabo, also a graduate of the Harvard Graduate School of Design (Szabo Associates). Szabo also had an architectural practice with architect Jerzy Soltan, the Nelson Robinson Jr. Professor of Architecture and Urban Design Emeritus at the Harvard Graduate School of Design (Soltan/Szabo Associates.)

Szabo retired in 1996. His post-retirement years were chiefly occupied with the making of art, particularly the creation of sculpture from found objects such as typewriters, tool handles, barrel staves, and shoe forms. In summer 2001 the Carpenter Center for the Visual Arts, Harvard University held an exhibition of his work, titled “Inventions + Interventions.” An exhibition catalogue was issued by the Carpenter Center for the Visual Arts. Between 2012 and 2014 a collection was donated to Harvard University (the Frances Loeb Library Special Collections Rare), as well as to the Bauhaus-Archiv museum für gestaltung

== Education ==
Albert Szabo was enrolled in Science Studies at Brooklyn College, Brooklyn, NY from 1942 to 1944. From 1946 to 1947 he concentrated in Fine Arts Studies, at the same college. From 1947 to 1948 he studied at the Chicago Institute of Design (formerly New Bauhaus, IIT Institute of Design), in Chicago, IL. He received his Master of Architecture degree from the Harvard Graduate School of Design, in 1952.

== Academic experience ==
Szabo's first teaching appointment was as instructor (1951–1954) at the Chicago Institute of Design (formerly New Bauhaus) in Chicago, IL. In 1954 he was invited to join the Faculty at the Harvard Graduate School of Design in Cambridge, MA. His next appointment (1964–1968) was as Chairman of the Department of Architectural Sciences, Faculty of Arts and Sciences at Harvard University. From 1967 to 1968, in addition to his appointments at Harvard, he was Visiting Professor of Architecture at the Rensselaer Polytechnic Institute. From 1970 to 1972 he held the position of chairman of the Department of Visual and Environmental Studies, Faculty of Arts and Sciences, Harvard University. In 1974 he was Acting Curator for the Loeb Fellowship in Advanced Environmental Studies, Harvard Graduate School of Design. Szabo was Fulbright Lecturer in Architecture from 1974 to 1976 at Kabul University, Kabul, Afghanistan and in 1983, acted as Visiting Professor and Consultant on Curriculum at King Faisal University, Al-Hofuf, Saudi Arabia. From 1970 to 1991 he held the position of Professor of Visual and Environmental Studies, Faculty of Arts and Sciences, Harvard University and, from 1990 to 1992, the position of Acting Director at the Carpenter Center for the Visual Arts Faculty of Arts and Sciences, Harvard University. He held the position of Professor of Architecture at the Harvard Graduate School of Design, from 1967 to 1996, and from 1991 to 1996 was Osgood Hooker Professor of Visual Arts, Faculty of Arts and Sciences, Harvard University.

== Major professional experience ==
Szabo's first professional experience was working as apprentice to Marcel Breuer in New York City from 1947 to 1948. He established a private practice in architecture with his wife, Brenda Dyer Szabo (A.B. 1948, Radcliffe College, M.Arch. 1951, Harvard University) in 1952, which continued through 1992. From 1953 to 1954 he was Project Manager for Howard T. Fisher and Associates Architects and Engineers, Chicago, IL. In 1955 he returned to the east coast, where he was given the position of Job Captain for Carleton B Richmond, Jr. Architect, in Cambridge, MA (1955 to 1956). 1956-1960 he was Job Captain and Associate at Compton and Pierce Architects, Cambridge, MA. From 1964 to 1967 he was Senior Associate at Albert D Anderson Architect, (M.Arch. 1951, Harvard University), Sherborn, MA. In 1967 he joined his colleague at Harvard, Jerzy Soltan to create the architectural practice, Soltan/Szabo Associates in Cambridge, MA. He was principal in the firm, which lasted from 1967 to 1971. In 1972 he acted as Fulbright Consultant to Municipality of Tehran, Tehran, Iran, and from 1974 to 1975 he was Consultant to the Government of Afghanistan and the U.S. Agency for International Development in Kabul, Afghanistan

== Sources ==
- 'Albert Szabo, Artist' by Ken Gewerz in The Harvard Gazette, 19 July 2001
- VES Co-Founder, Innovative Designer Dies by Adam C. Estes, 21 January 2004
- 'Albert Szabo, Faculty of Arts and Sciences—Memorial Minute' by Alfred F. Guzzetti, Toshihiro Katayama, Christopher Killip, John R. Stilgoe, Eduard F. Sekler (Chair), 19 April 2007
