= Eduard Sekler =

- Born: Eduard Franz Sekler; 30 September 1920; Vienna, Austria
- Died: 1 May 2017 (aged 96); Cambridge, Massachusetts, U.S.
- Known for: Architectural history

Eduard Franz Sekler (30 September 1920 – 1 May 2017) was an architectural historian and Osgood Hooker Professor of Visual Art Emeritus and professor of architecture emeritus at Harvard University.

== Biography ==
A native of Vienna, Eduard Sekler earned his professional degree with distinction in architecture from its Vienna University of Technology, before studying under Rudolf Wittkower at the School of Planning and Regional Research in London, and receiving his PhD in the history of art at London University's Warburg Institute. Sekler came to Harvard in 1960, at the invitation of Josep Lluis Sert, later co-founding (along with Albert Szabo) the university's Visual and Environmental Studies department in 1968.

Outside of his explicit professorial duties, Sekler was active in efforts to preserve the cultural and architectural heritage of Nepal's Kathmandu Valley. After first visiting in 1962, he made multiple return trips to the valley in association with UNESCO and led the production of plans to safeguard the valley's heritage from development and population pressures. In 1990 he founded the Kathmandu Valley Preservation Trust (KVPT), and later served as an honorary member of its board of directors.

Sekler died on 1 May 2017 in Cambridge, Massachusetts.

== Selected writings ==
- Sekler, Eduard F. (1956), Wren and his place in European architecture, Faber and Faber

== See also ==
- Schwartz, Madeleine, M. (1 Jun 2009), "Making Room for Art: Construction of Loeb Drama Center and the Carpenter Center elevates the role of creation on campus", The Harvard Crimson, Harvard University
