= Jerzy Sołtan =

Polish architect (1913–2005)

- Born: March 6, 1913; Prezma, Russian Empire (now Silmala Parish, Latvia)
- Died: September 16, 2005 (aged 92); Cambridge, Massachusetts, U.S.
- Education: Warsaw University of Technology
- Occupation: Architect
- Years active: 1959-1979
- Spouse: Hanna Sołtan née Borucińska
- Buildings: 10th-Anniversary Stadium

Jerzy Sołtan (March 6, 1913 - September 16, 2005) was a Polish architect who worked with Le Corbusier and was the Robinson Jr., Professor of Architecture and Urban Design at Harvard Graduate School of Design, where he taught from 1959 until his retirement in 1979. In addition, "between 1968 and 1970 he worked in partnership with Albert Szabo (Sołtan and Szabo)...with whom he designed several houses in New Hampshire and Massachusetts."

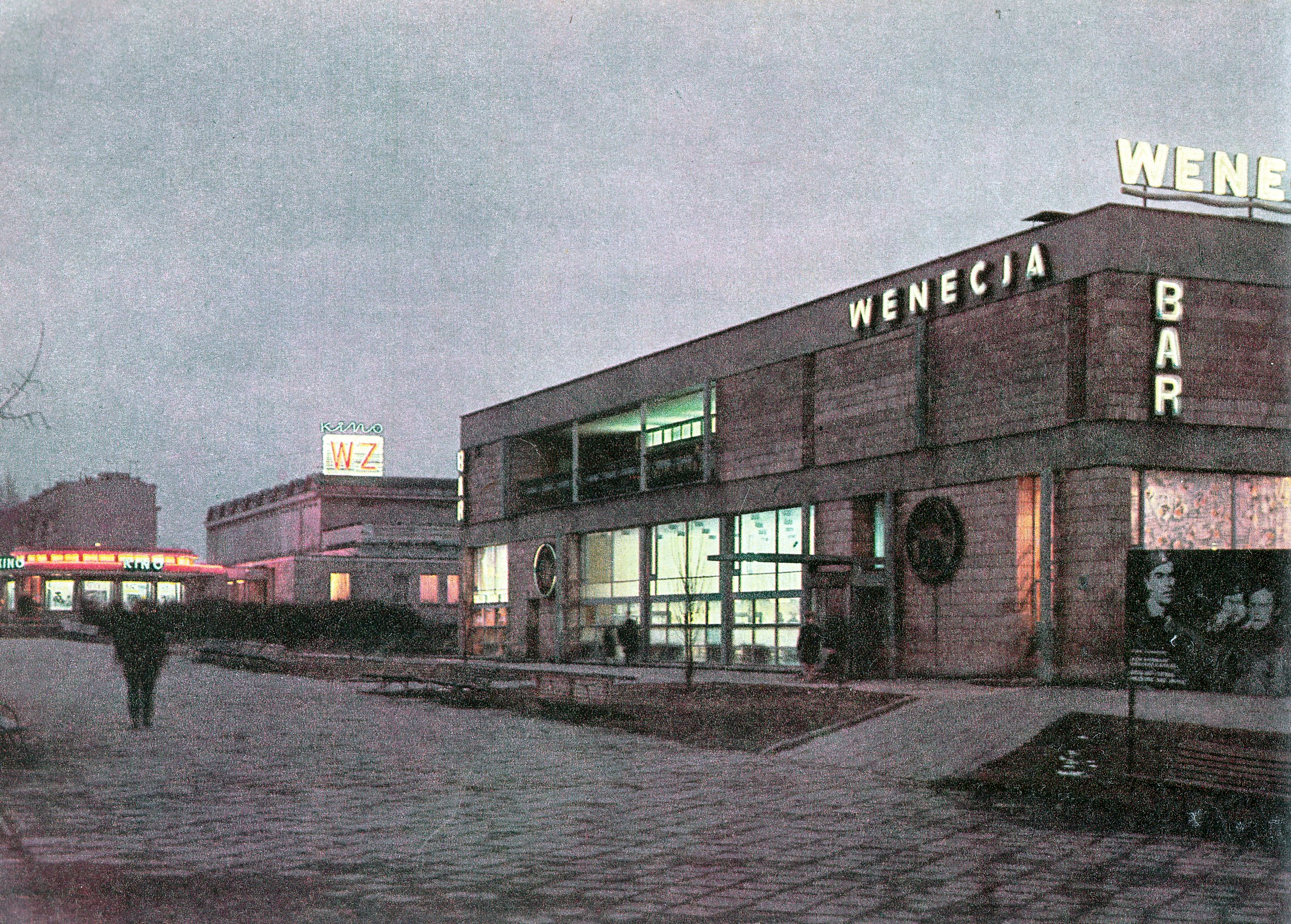
The Venice Bar in Warsaw (1961).

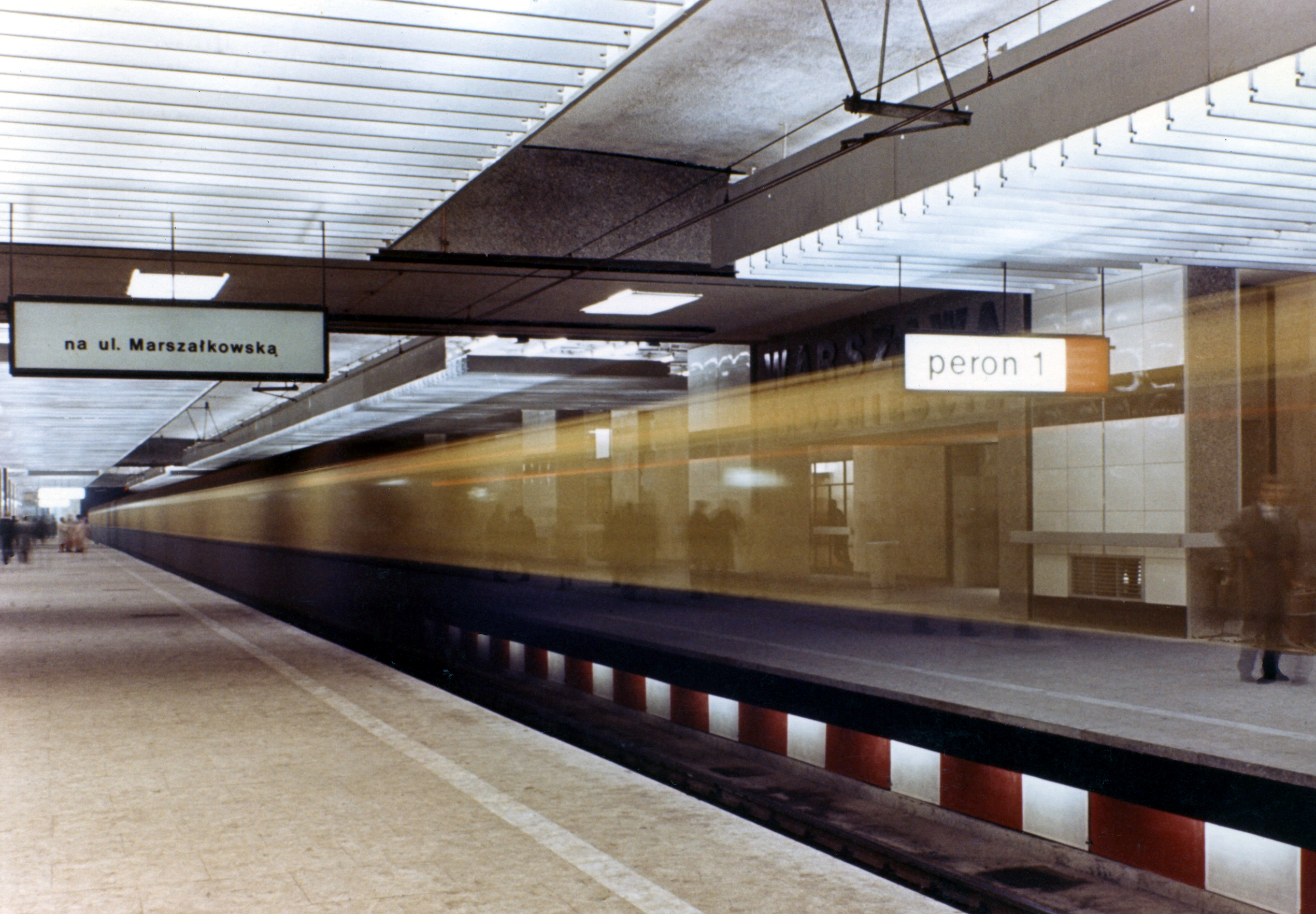
Warszawa Śródmieście railway station (1963) created by Jerzy Sołtan together with optical art painter Wojciech Fangor.

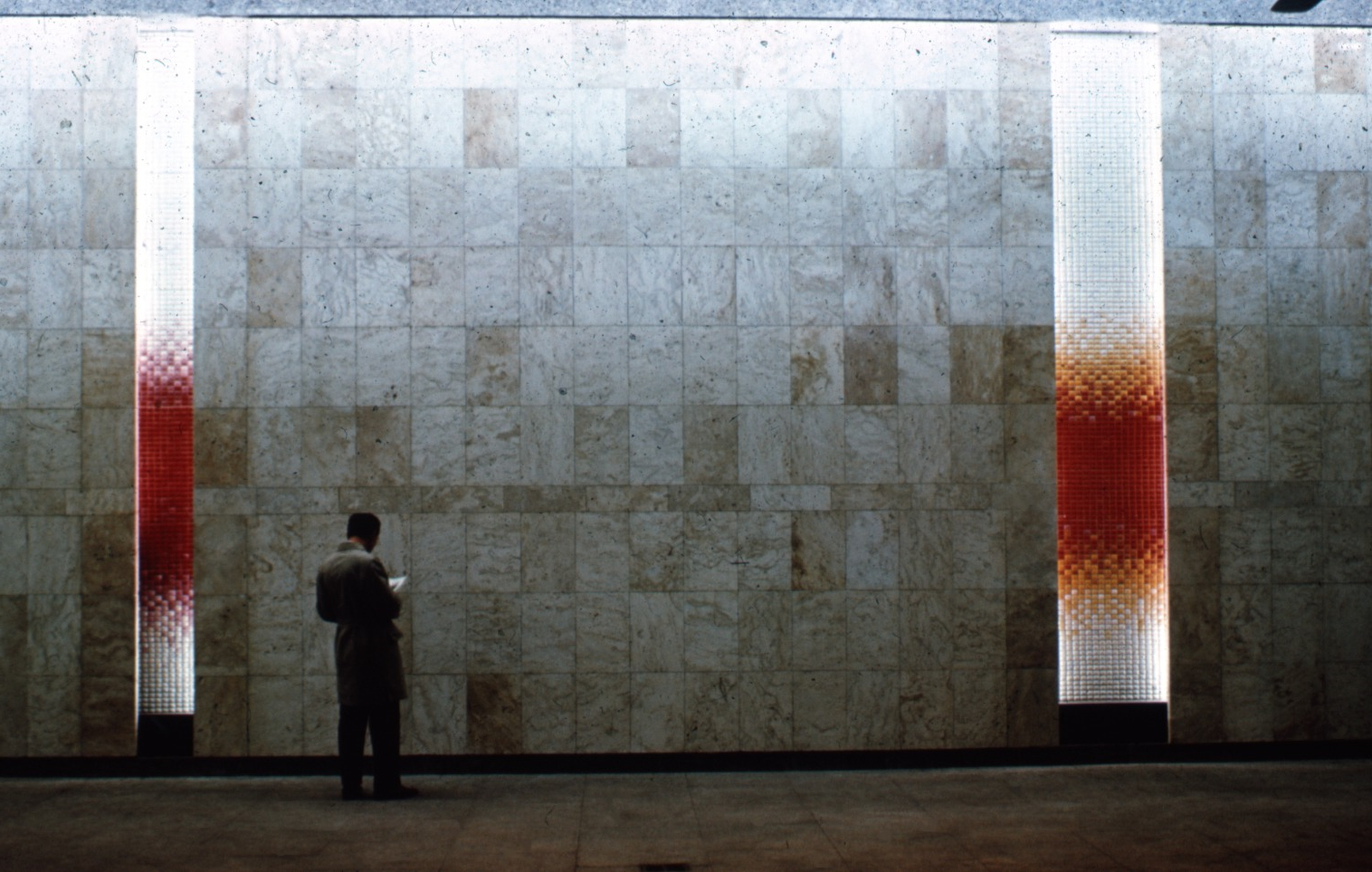
Warszawa Śródmieście railway station (1963)

His teaching was first recognized by the Association of Collegiate Schools of Architecture when he received the ACSA Distinguished Professor Award in 1986–87. The American Institute of Architects and the Association of Collegiate Schools of Architecture jointly awarded Soltan the Topaz Medallion for Excellence in Architectural Education in 2002.
