= Hyatt Regency Kathmandu =

Hotel in Nepal

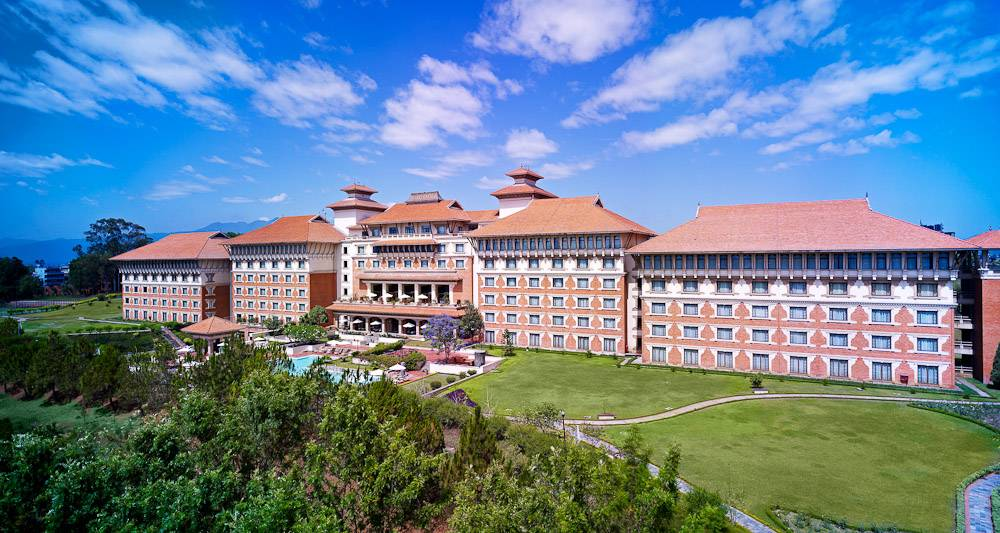
- Hyatt Regency Kathmandu

- Location within Nepal
- Hotel chain: Hyatt

General information
- Location: Kathmandu, Nepal
- Coordinates: 27.7220°N 85.3550°E
- Opening: 31 August 2000

Other information
- Number of rooms: 280
- Number of suites: 7

Website
- kathmandu.regency.hyatt.com

The Hyatt Regency Hotel in Kathmandu, Nepal, is an urban five-star resort located near the Boudhanath stupa. The hotel, opened in 2000, is built in the traditional Newar architecture on 37 acres of land. It is operated by Taragaon Regency Hotels, and employs 400 workers. The hotel was built under public-private partnership with 40% public ownership and 60% private. It recorded losses for 22 years, during which the public ownership of the hotel shrank to 9%, and later began registering record profits. The public land on which the hotel was built was in the process of being privatised at extremely cheap rates. Parliamentary committees began investigating possible financial irregularities by the private partners, including the possibility that Taragaon Regency Hotels deliberately showed losses in order to illegally gain ownership stake on the hotel by decreasing the share prices and buying them back cheaply, while deterring investment from others. The Auditor General's office and the Commission for the Investigation of Abuse of Authority also investigated the activities of Taragaon Regency Hotels. As of 2020, Taragaon Development Committee, the entity representing public interests in the hotel, is attempting to reclaim the land into public ownership.

== The hotel ==
Hyatt Regency is the biggest five-star hotel in Nepal. Located near the Bouddhanath stupa, the hotel stretches over 37 acres. The building incorporates elements of the traditional Newar architecture; the decorations in the lobby and around the premises include Buddhist chortens and other decorative motifs. It has 280 guest rooms, including seven suites. The hotel is operated by Taragaon Regency Hotels. It is listed at the Nepal Stock Exchange.

=== Workers ===
The hotel employs around 400 workers, 320 of them affiliated to All Nepal Hotel, Casino and Restaurant Workers Union. The hotel suspended its services for a week in 2019, when workers affiliated with the union went on strike, alleging that the management had cut worker facilities and benefits even as the hotel's net profits increased significantly. The strike was later called-off upon request from the Ministry of Labour.

== History ==
The establishment of the hotel was approved in 1992 under public–private partnership. The public interest was represented by Tourism Ministry's Taragaon Development Committee; the private partners were Radheshyam Sharaf and Ramlal Shrestha families. The public investment amounted to Rs 170 million (40%); the private investment was Rs 257.5 million (60%). For public investment, half of the land on which the hotel was to be built was sold to the hotel for a stake of 40%, and the other half was retained in public ownership and leased to the hotel. Estimated to cost Rs 1.5 billion including a proposed cultural museum, (Note: Asian Development Bank's estimate was Rs 2.2 billion) it cost Rs 3.4 billion to bring into operation, without the museum, which was never built. It came into operation on 31 August 2000, and was formally inaugurated by King Birendra the next month.

The hotel continuously recorded losses for 22 years, deterring investment. By 2017, the public share in the hotel had shrunk to 9%; the ownership of original private investors increased slightly to around 62%. (Note: According to one Republica report, their ownership is 80%.) Public representation on the board of directors had shrunk to one member out of eleven, from three members out of nine in 1993; the Sharaf and Shrestha families had seven seats on the board. By 2019, the hotel was registering record profits with quarterly revenues of more than Rs 1 billion.

=== Hyatt Regency scandal ===
According to a 2017 report by Nagarik Daily, the original private partners, the Sharaf and Shrestha families, with the collusion of government officials, showed losses for the hotel for years, decreasing the price of the shares and buying them back to increase their ownership, while officials persuaded governments to not invest in it. It reported that the 37-acre public land that the hotel was built on, was in danger of falling into private ownership due to decreasing public share in the hotel. The government representative assigned the only seat at the Board of Directors had been boycotting the board meetings in protest. One investigative committee had submitted its report to the Ministry but no action was taken on it. With records showing losses, the partners had successfully avoided paying dividend to small shareholders or paying taxes, while the hotel's assets kept growing.

In November 2018, speaking to a parliamentary committee, the chief of Taragaon Development Committee and public representative to the Board of Directors who had been boycotting board meetings, said that the public land the hotel was built on was in the process of being converted into shares and privatised at extremely cheap rates. He demanded an independent audit of the hotel's financial records. The Office of the Auditor General published a report concluding that financial irregularities had been committed in value re-assessment of the land. The parliamentary Public Accounts Committee started an investigation.

In April 2019, a subcommittee of the parliamentary International Relations Committee, finding irregularities in share and land ownership transfers that resulted in reduction of public ownership to 9%, directed the government to take immediate steps to regain the land leased to Taragaon Regency Hotels. It also directed the government and the Commission for the Investigation of Abuse of Authority (CIAA) to launch investigation into possible illegal conduct by Taragaon Regency in recording losses for the hotel for 22 years in order to benefit itself at the cost of public investment, as well as other financial irregularities. CIAA submitted its report to the government in September 2019. According to Nayapatrika, as of June 2020, Taragaon Development Committee has sent a formal letter to the Tourism Ministry, to begin the process of reclaiming Hyatt's land into public ownership.

== Awards ==
The hotel won the Service Excellence Award 2017, awarded by Luxury Travel Guide at the Asia and Australasia Awards. It had previously won the same award in 2008, 2009, 2011, 2013 and 2016; it won again in 2018 and 2019.
