= Patan Museum =

Museum in Nepal

- पाटन संग्रहालय
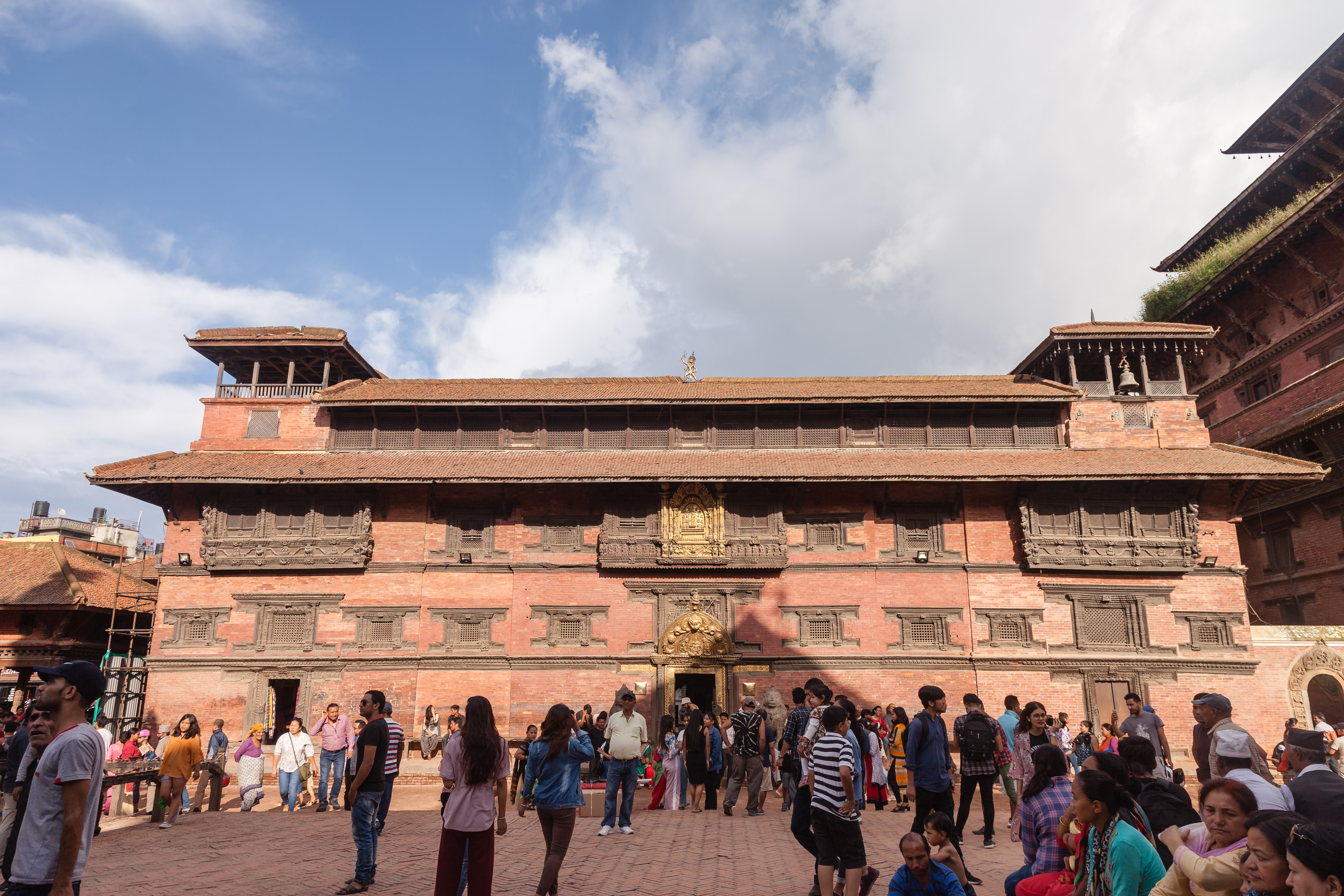
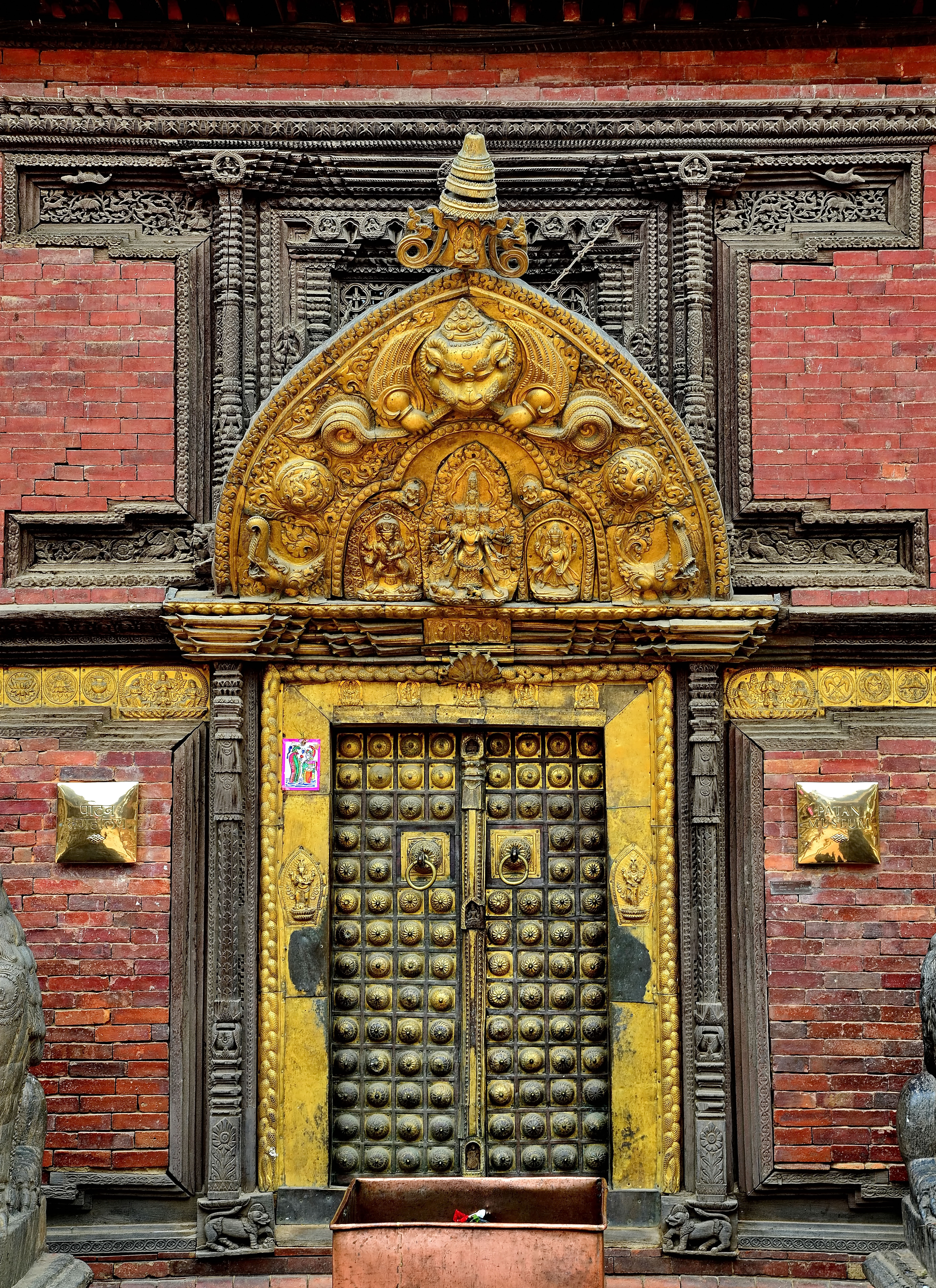
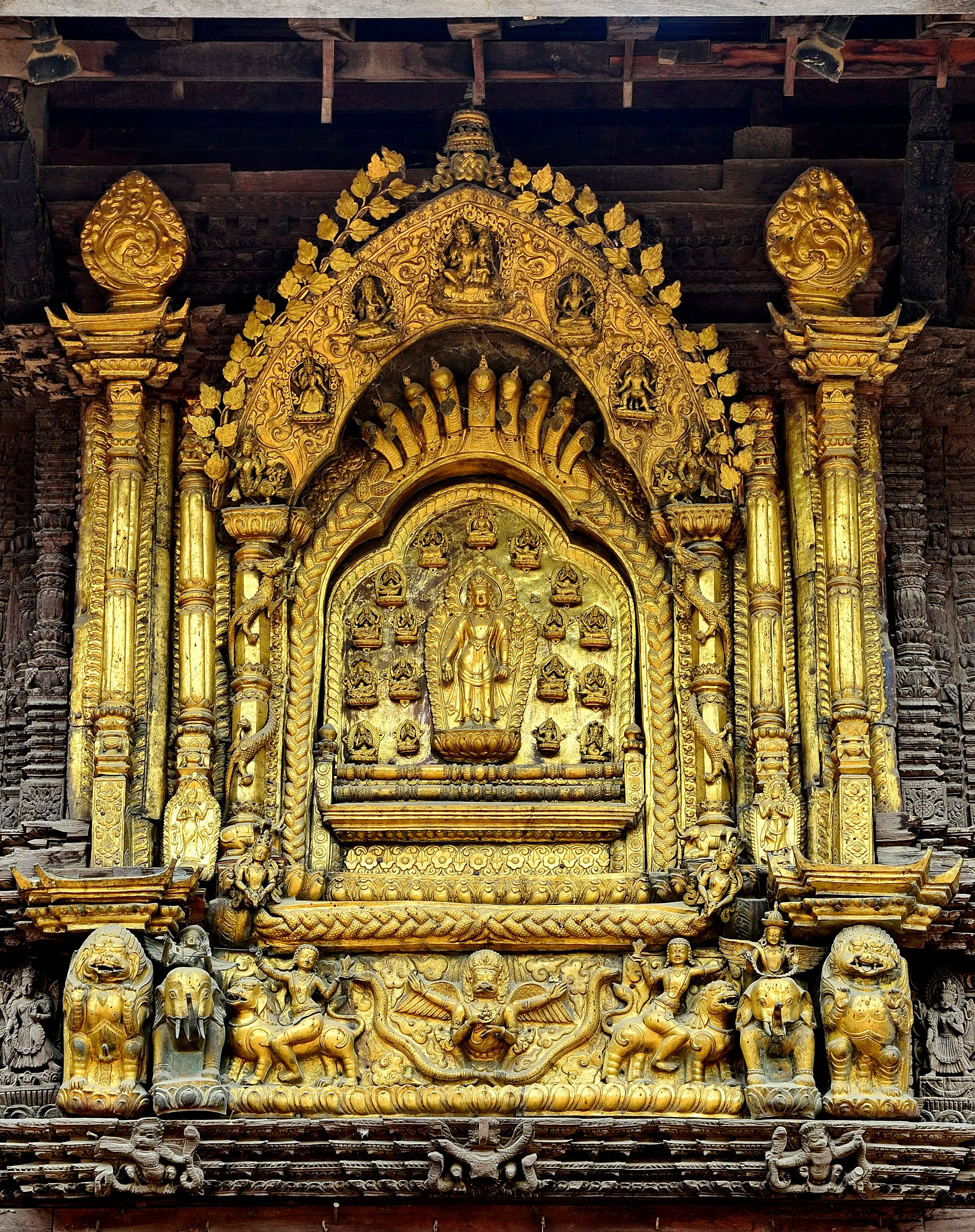
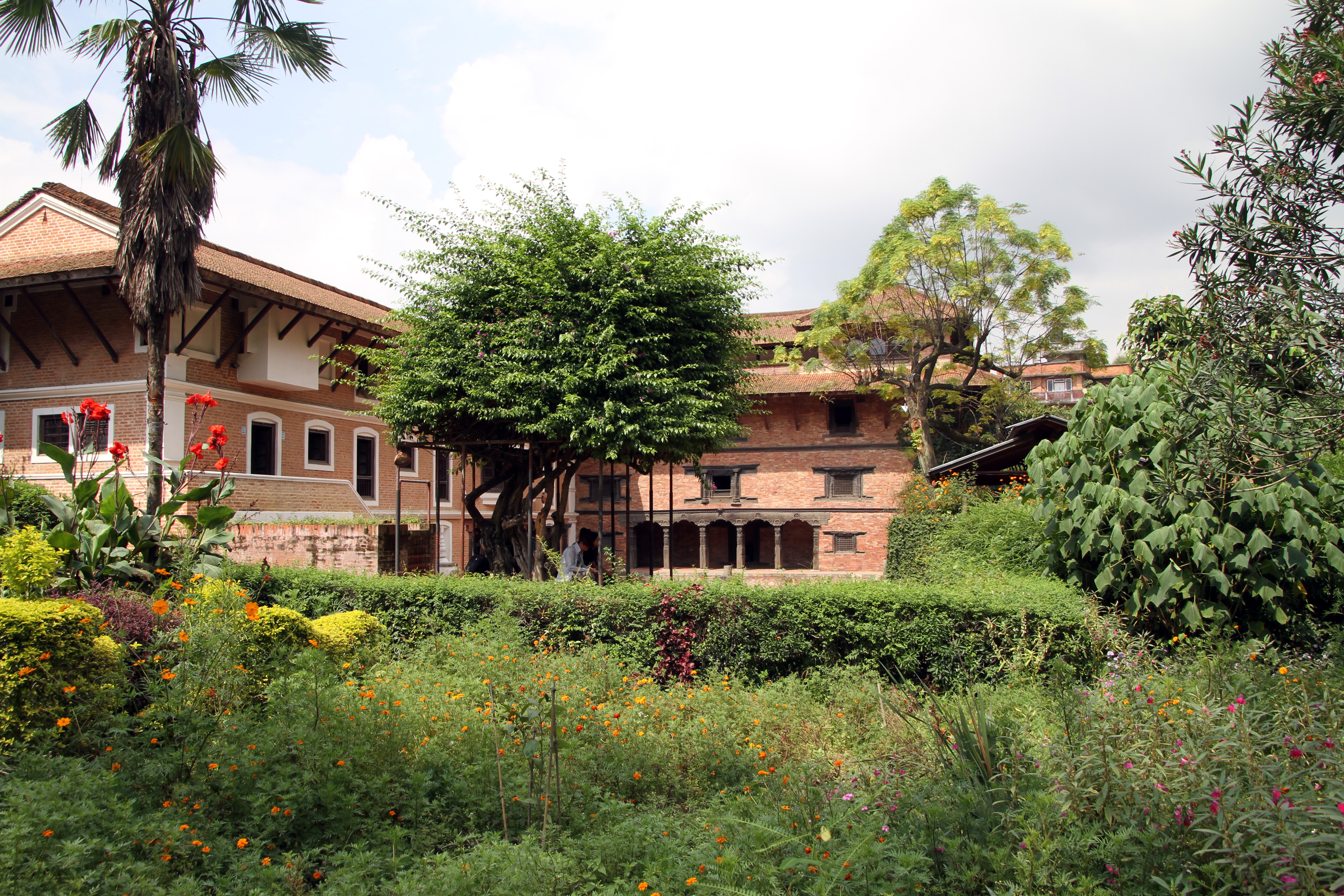
- Clockwise from top: Façade of the museum, Golden window, Garden of the royal palace, Golden gate
- Established: 1982; 43 years ago
- Location: Patan Durbar Square, Lalitpur, Nepal
- Coordinates: 27.6730952°N 85.3256380°E
- Type: History museum
- Visitors: 175,851 (2020)
- Director: Damodar Gautam
- Owner: Ministry of Culture, Tourism and Civil Aviation
- Website: Official website

The Patan Museum (Nepali: पाटन संग्रहालय) is a museum located in Patan, Lalitpur, Nepal. The museum falls under the UNESCO's World Heritage Sites. The Patan Museum was inaugurated in 1997 by Late King Birendra Bir Bikram Shah. The Patan Museum displays the traditional sacred arts of Nepal in an illustrious architectural setting. Its home is an old residential court of Patan Durbar, one of the royal palaces of former Malla Kings of the Kathmandu Valley. The museum quadrangle is also known as Keshav Narayan Chowk. The Museum was restored by the Austrian architect the late Götz Hagmüller and the collection of the Museum itself was curated by the Late Mary Shepherd Slusser.

== History ==
The royal palace was built on the site of a Buddhist monastery. It has been renovated many times. Its current appearance dates from 1734.

In the 1934 earthquake the east wing was destroyed and later rebuilt.

For some time the building housed a public school.

Patan Durbar Square was again heavily damaged by the earthquake in April 2015. In 2017 the restored palace courtyard Sundari Chowk was added to the museum, creating room for the new Seamann Gallery and the Frozen Wall. Unlike the tiled floors in the rest of the museum, the floor here is covered with mud, the traditional Nepalese floor covering. The open space of Sundari Chowk houses Tusha Hiti, the royal bath commissioned by King Siddhi Narasimha Malla (1619–1661).

=== Present ===
Former International Artists in Residence include Nancy Condon, Jessica Melville-Brown, and Joy Lynn Davis.

The current chairman of the board of directors is Kedar Bahadur Adhikari, from the Ministry of Culture, Tourism and Civil Aviation, Singh Durbar, Kathmandu.

The entrance fees are 1000 Nepalese rupees for foreign visitors, 250 for SAARC visitors, 30 for Nepali visitors, and 15 for Nepalese students (with identification).

== Collection ==
The Patan Museum's mission is "the interpretation of Sacred Art, Culture and Iconography of Hinduism and Buddhism through preservation and exhibition."

The museum's exhibits cover a long span of Nepal's cultural history. It has over 1,100 artifacts, about 200 of which are on permanent display.

Most of the objects are cast bronzes (mostly sculptures of Hindu and Buddhist deities) and gilt copper repoussé work, crafts for which Patan is famous.

== Gallery ==
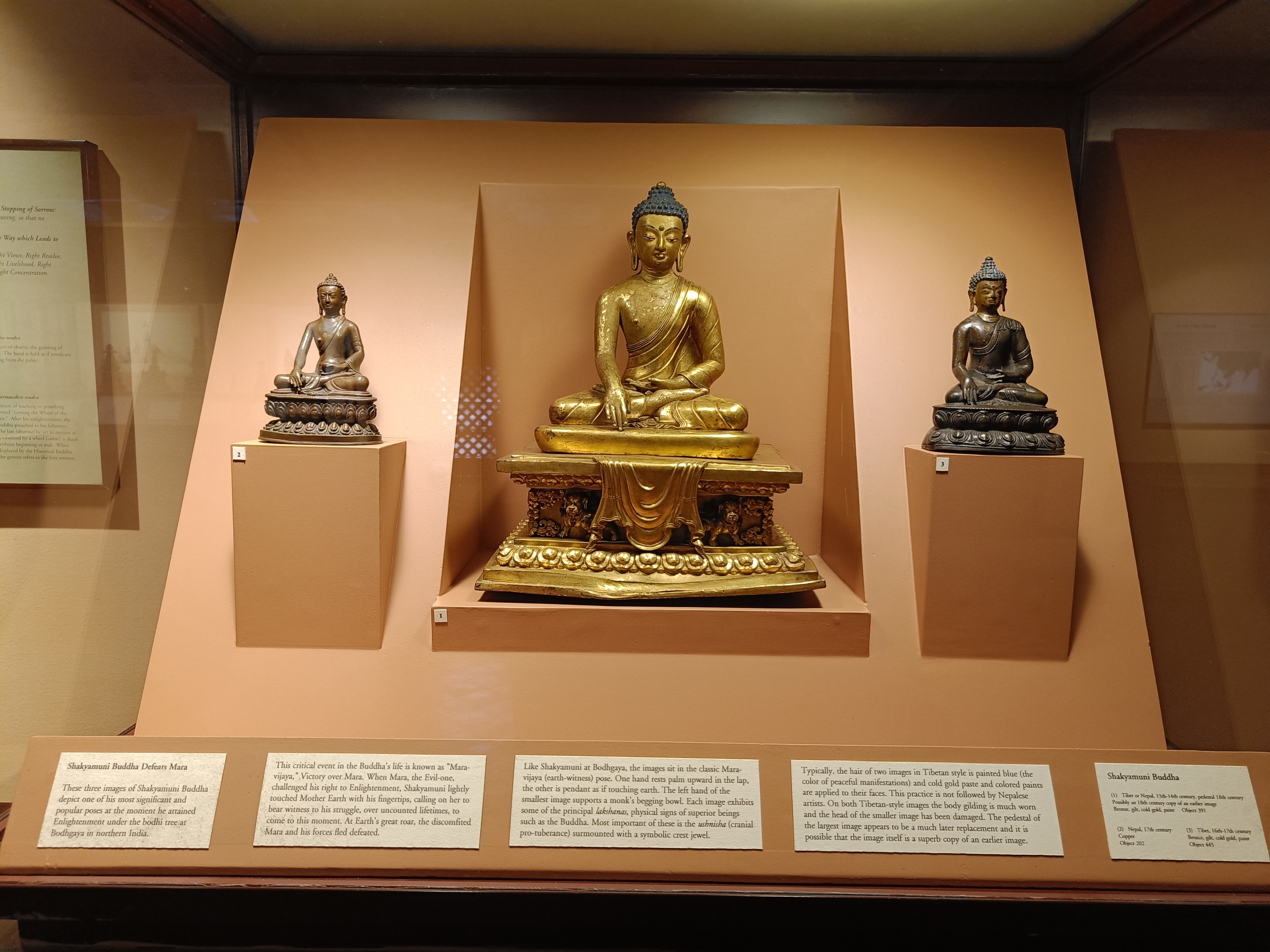
Sakyamuni Buddha

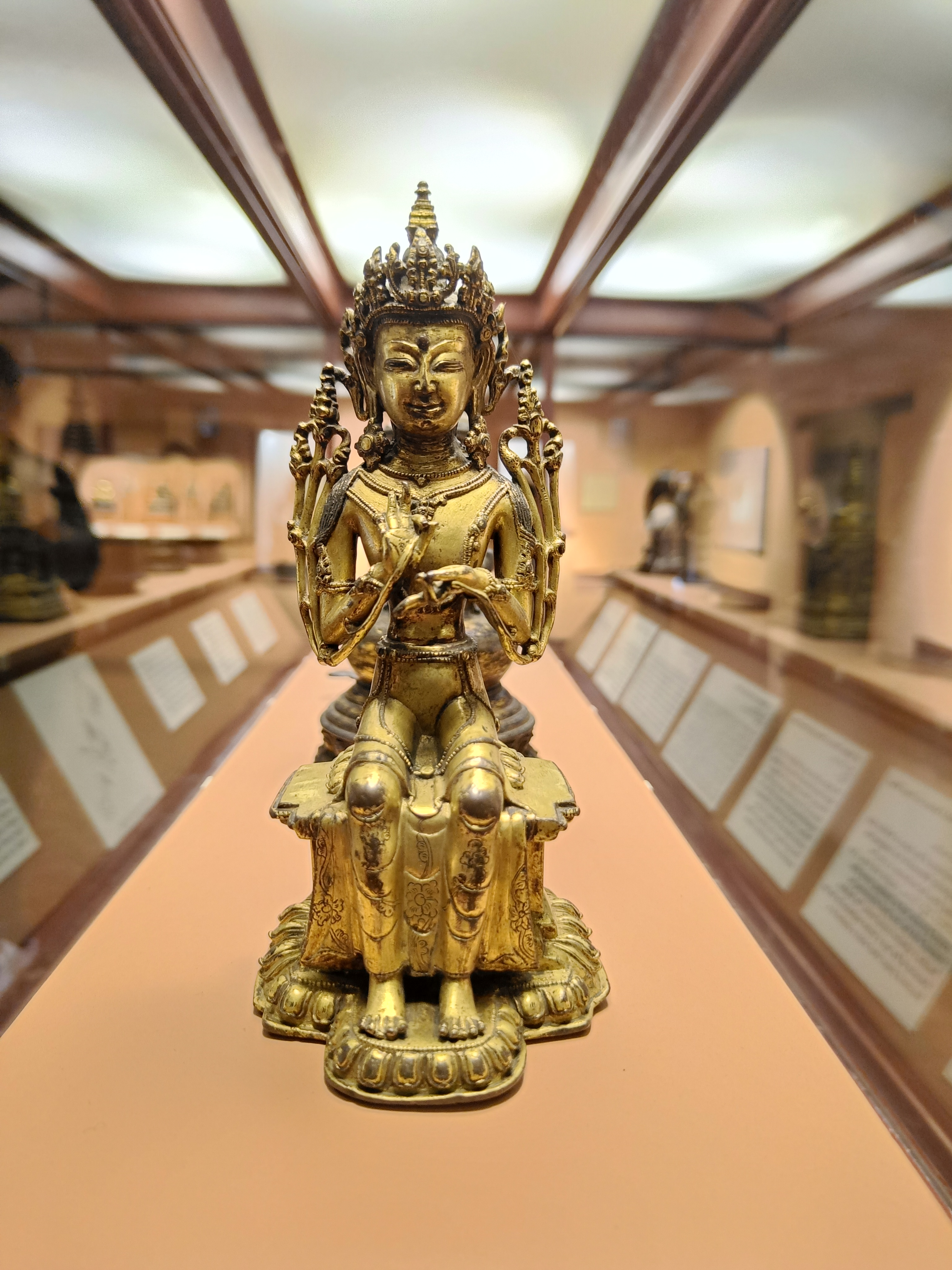
Buddha

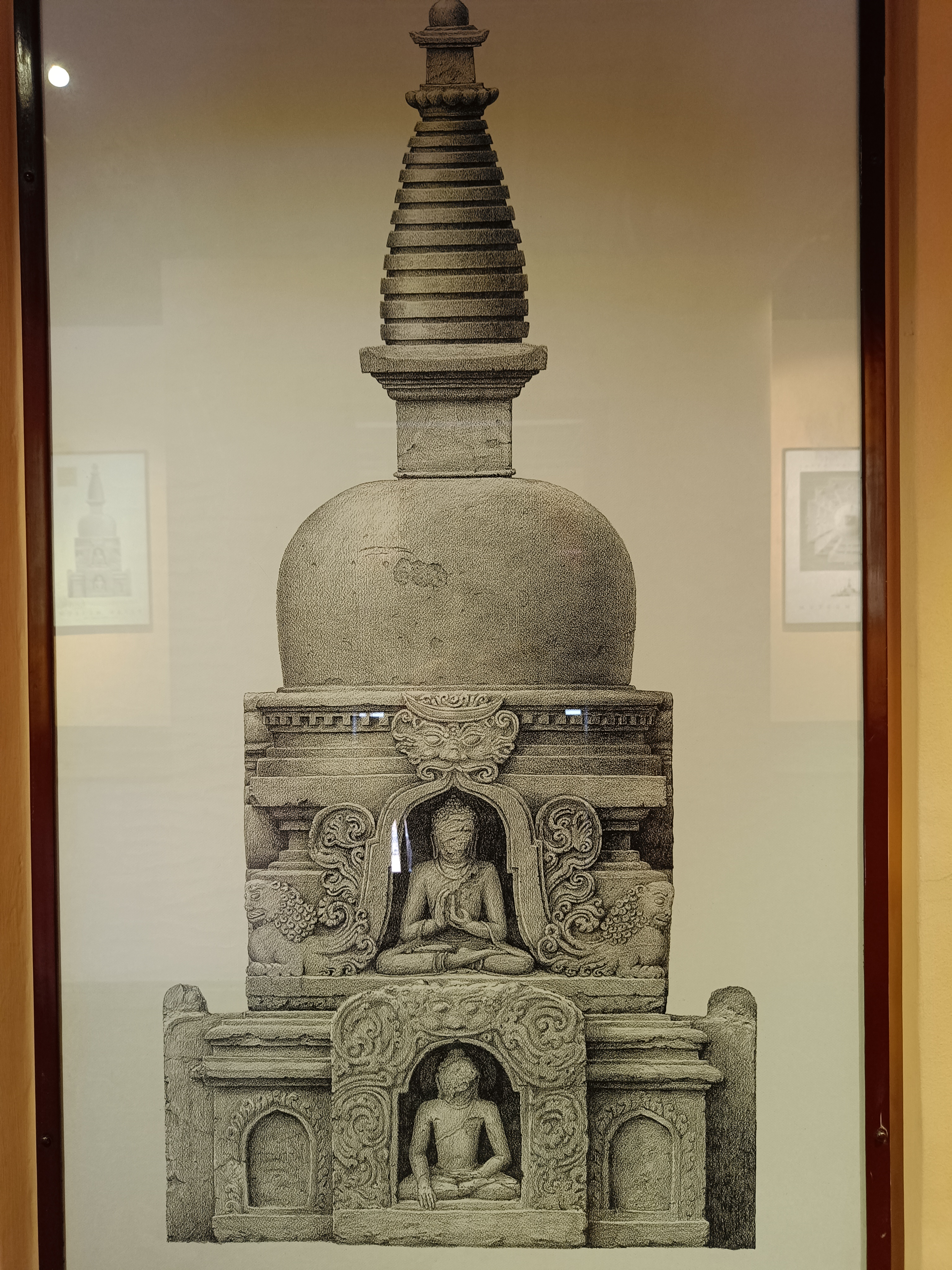
Depiction of typical small chaityas found in Nepal

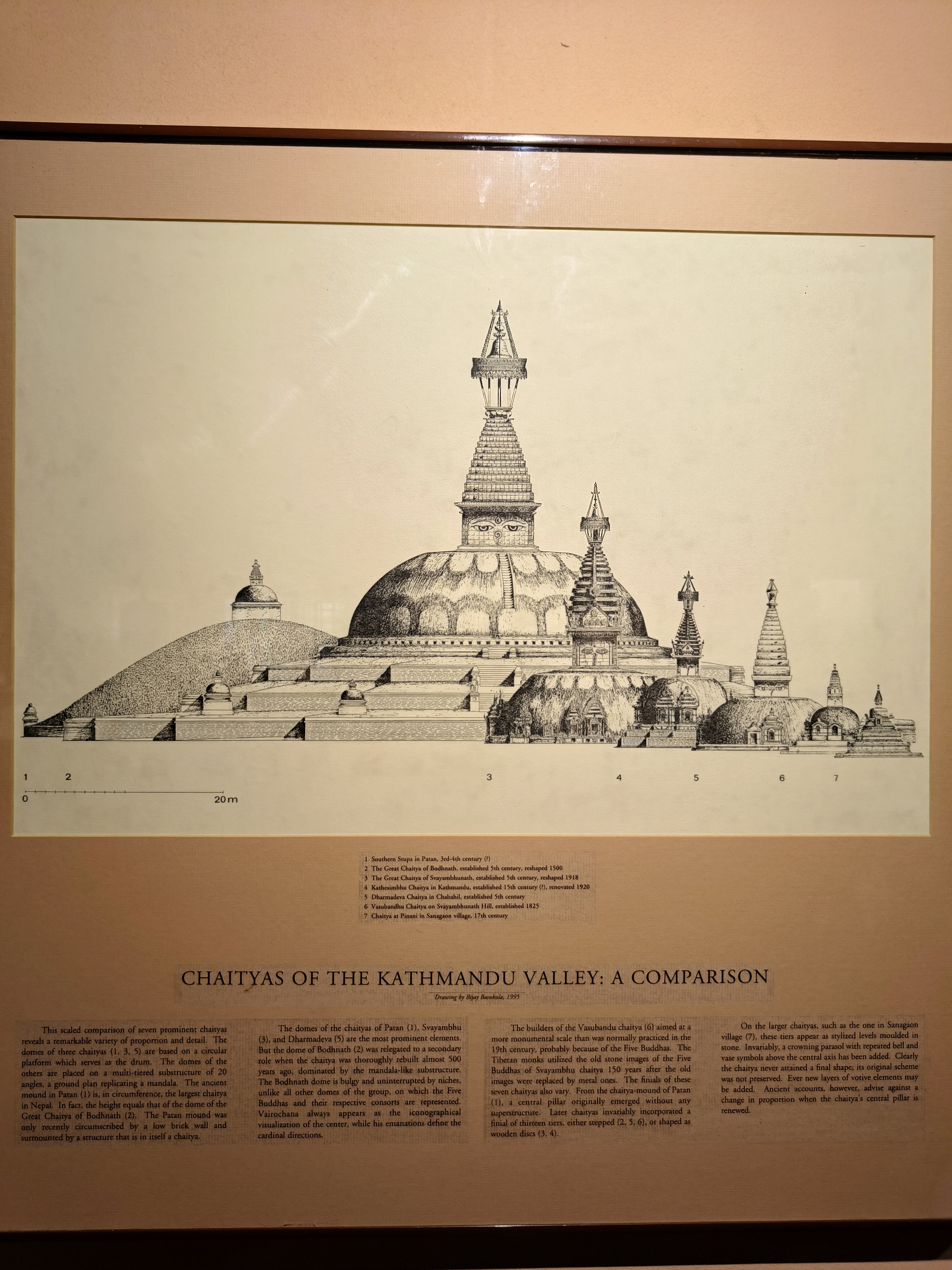
Chaityas of Kathmandu

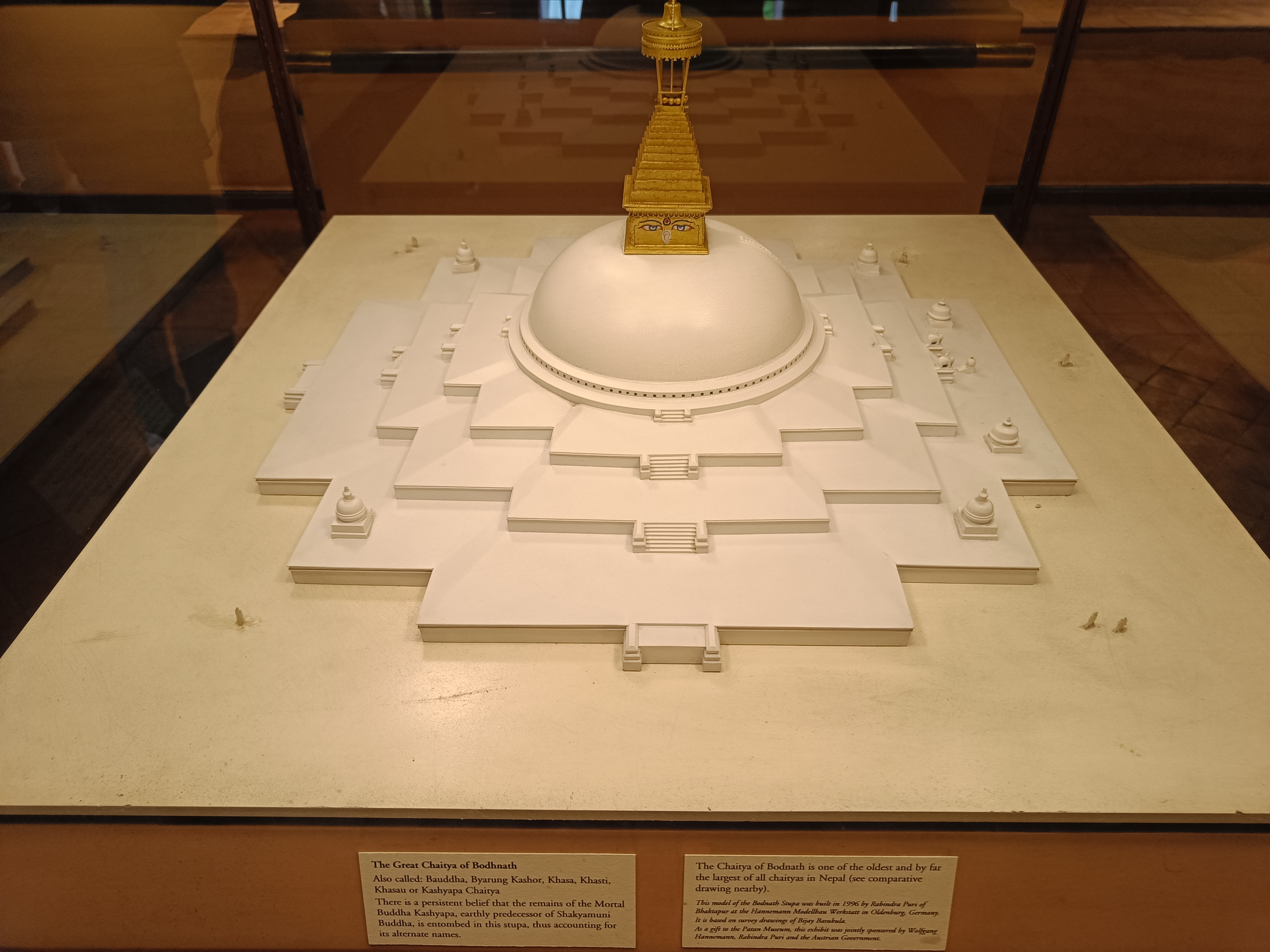
Model of the Great Chaitya of Boudhanath

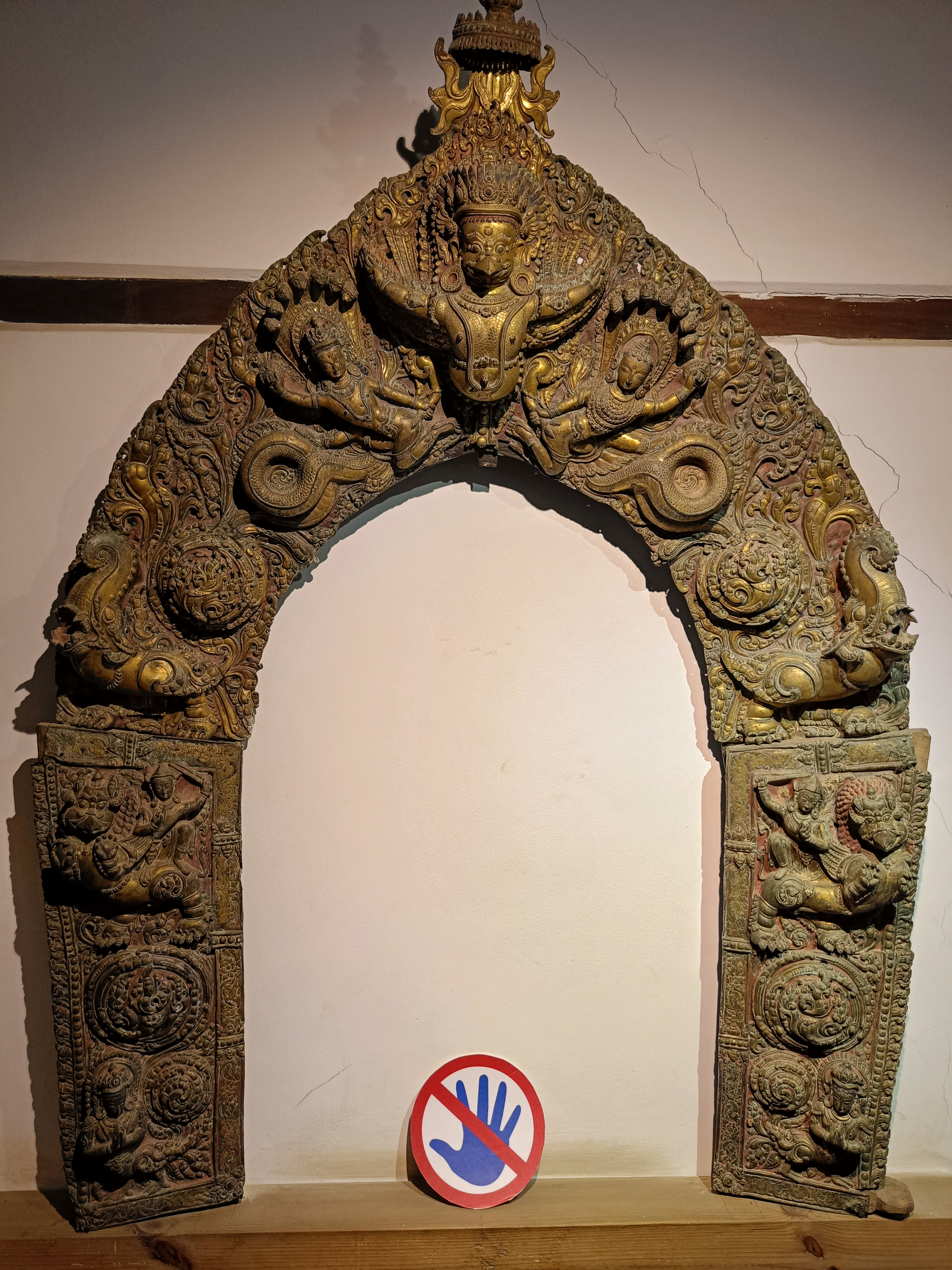
Bronze Casting and design

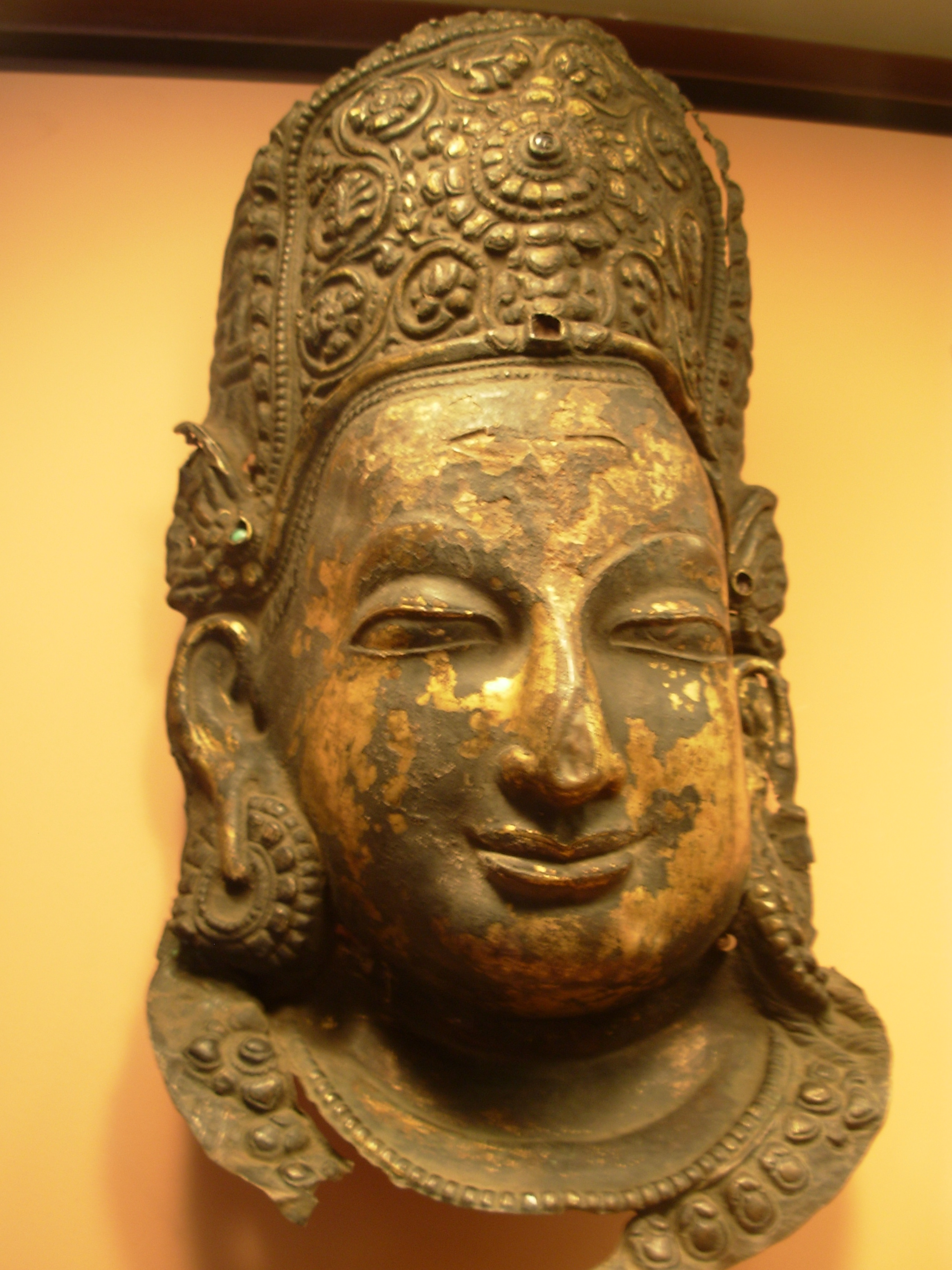
Indra, a Vedic God in Hinduism, Copper repoussé, gilt with semi-precious stones, 13th-14th century

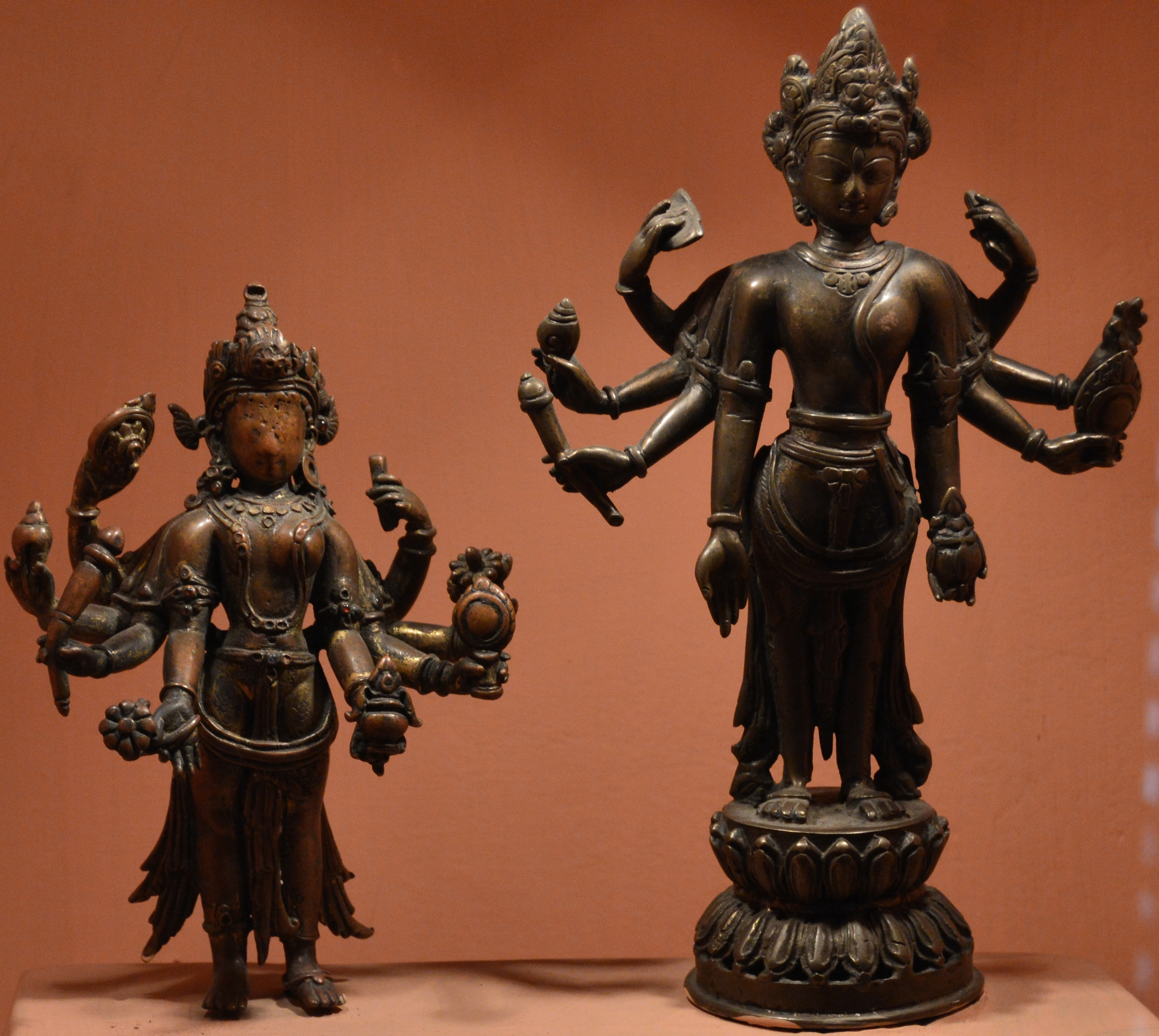
Lakshmi-Narayan Statue, 14th century

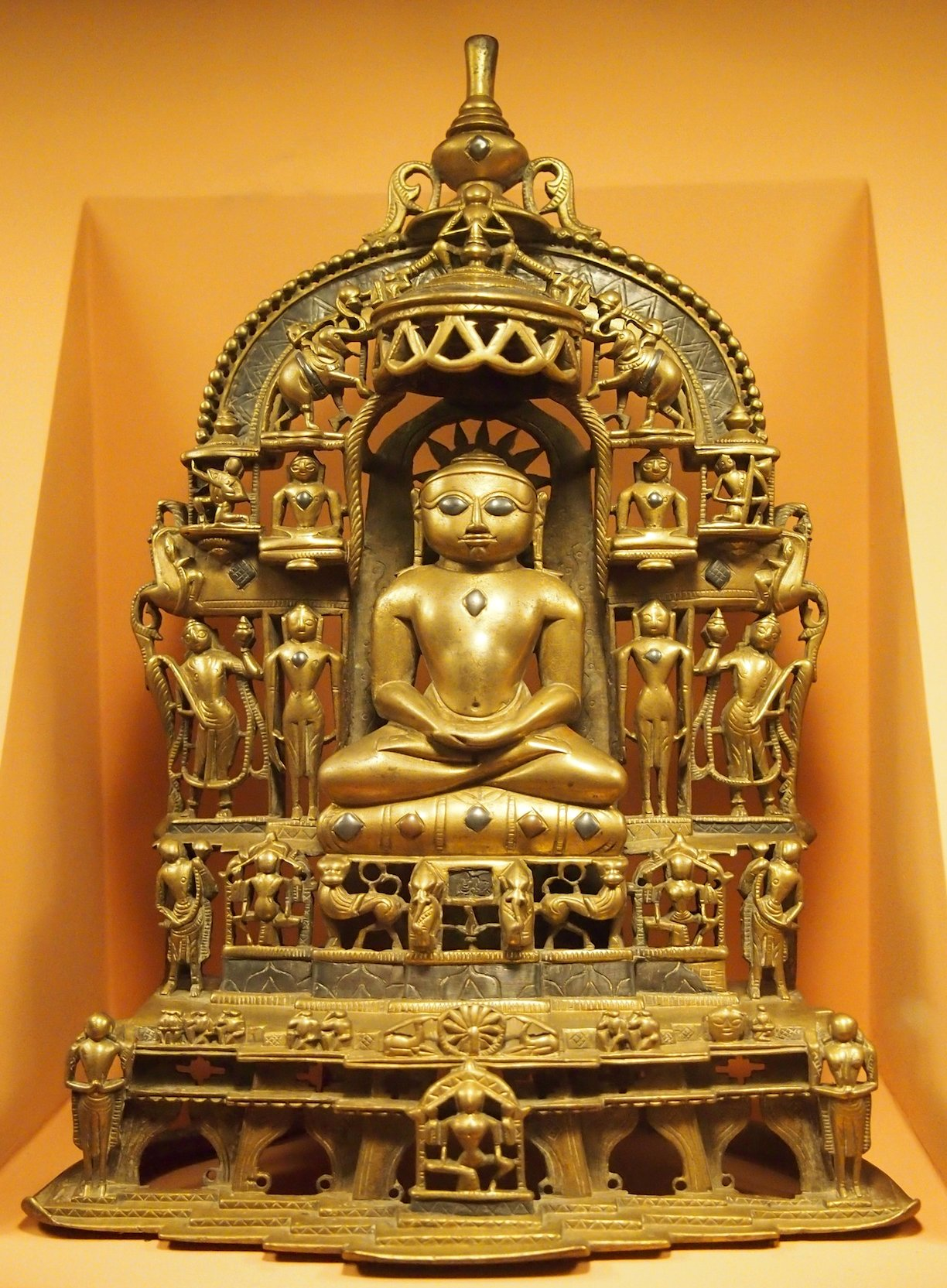
Adinatha, Rajasthan, 16th century

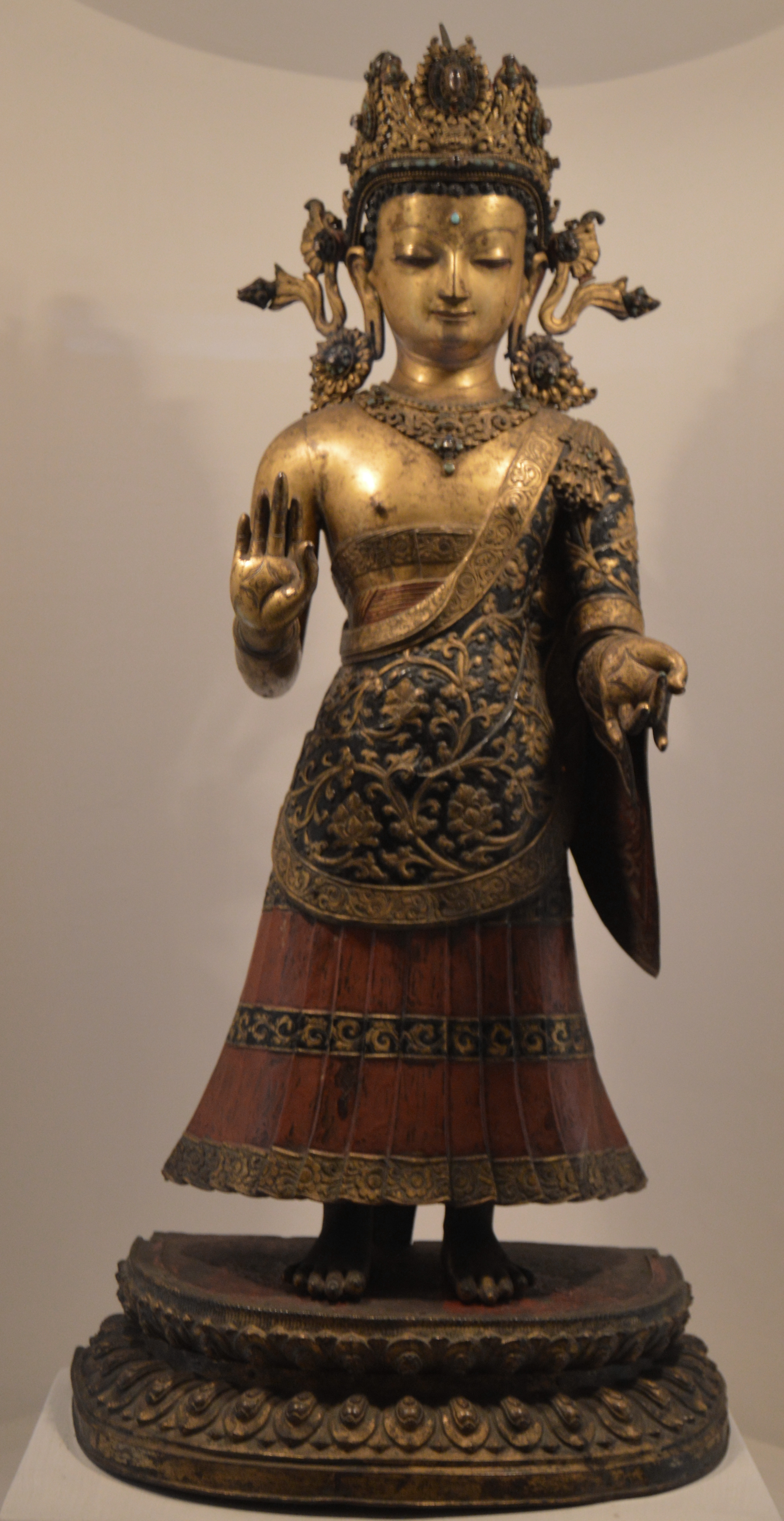
Dīpankara Buddha, Nepal, 17th-18th century

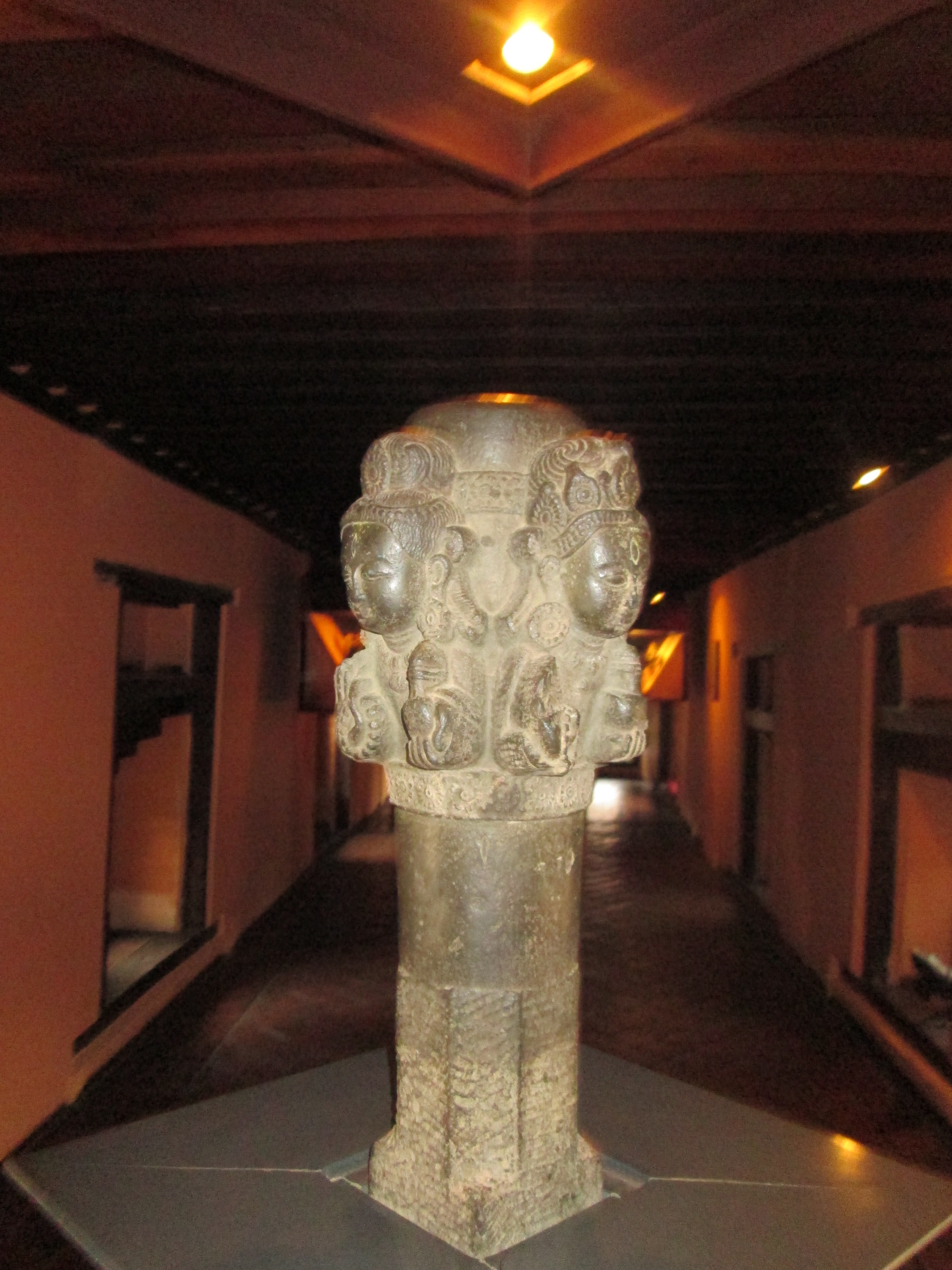
Four faced Shivalinga

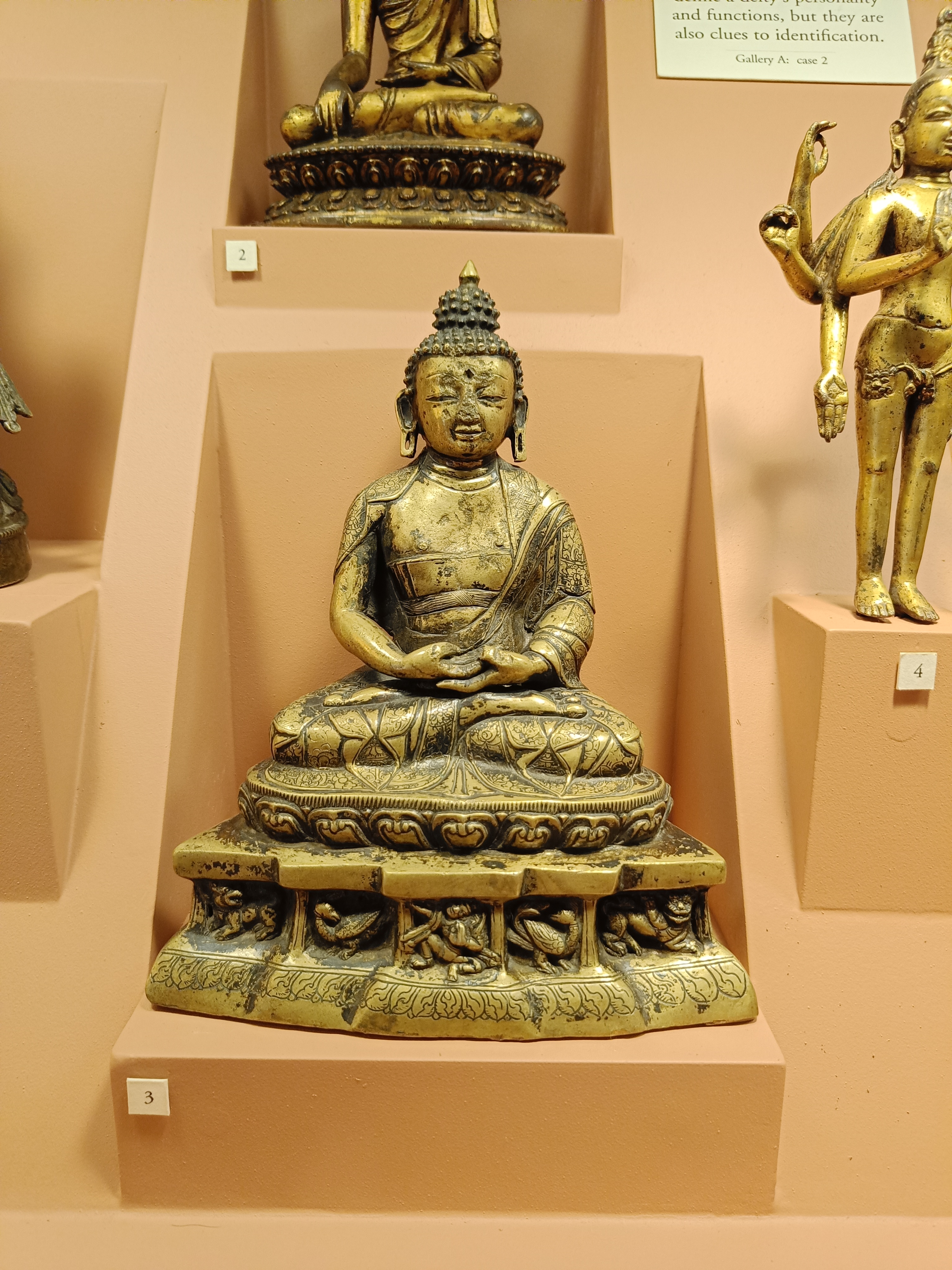
Amitabha, Tibet, 16th-17th century

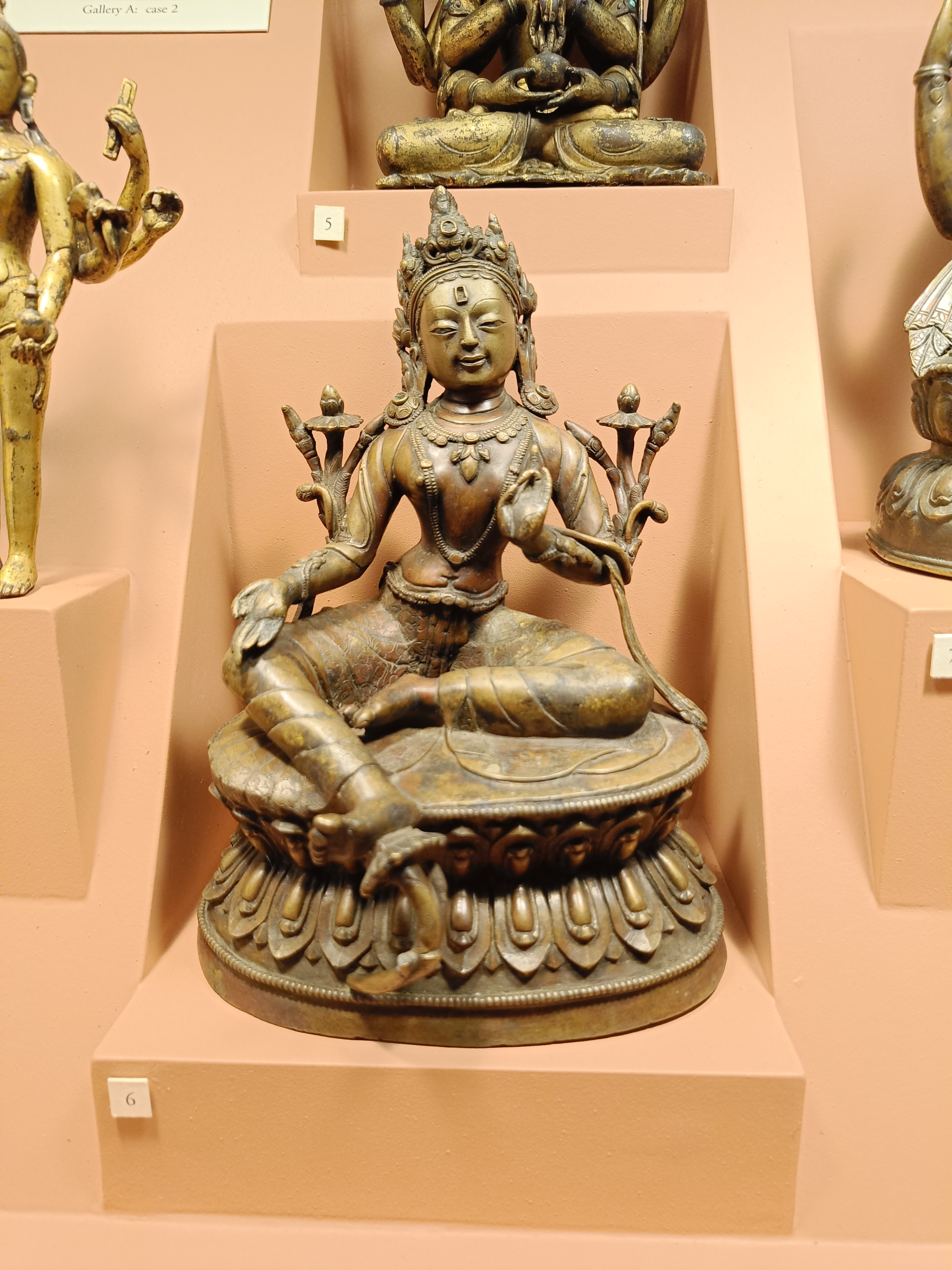
Green Tara, Tibet, 17th century

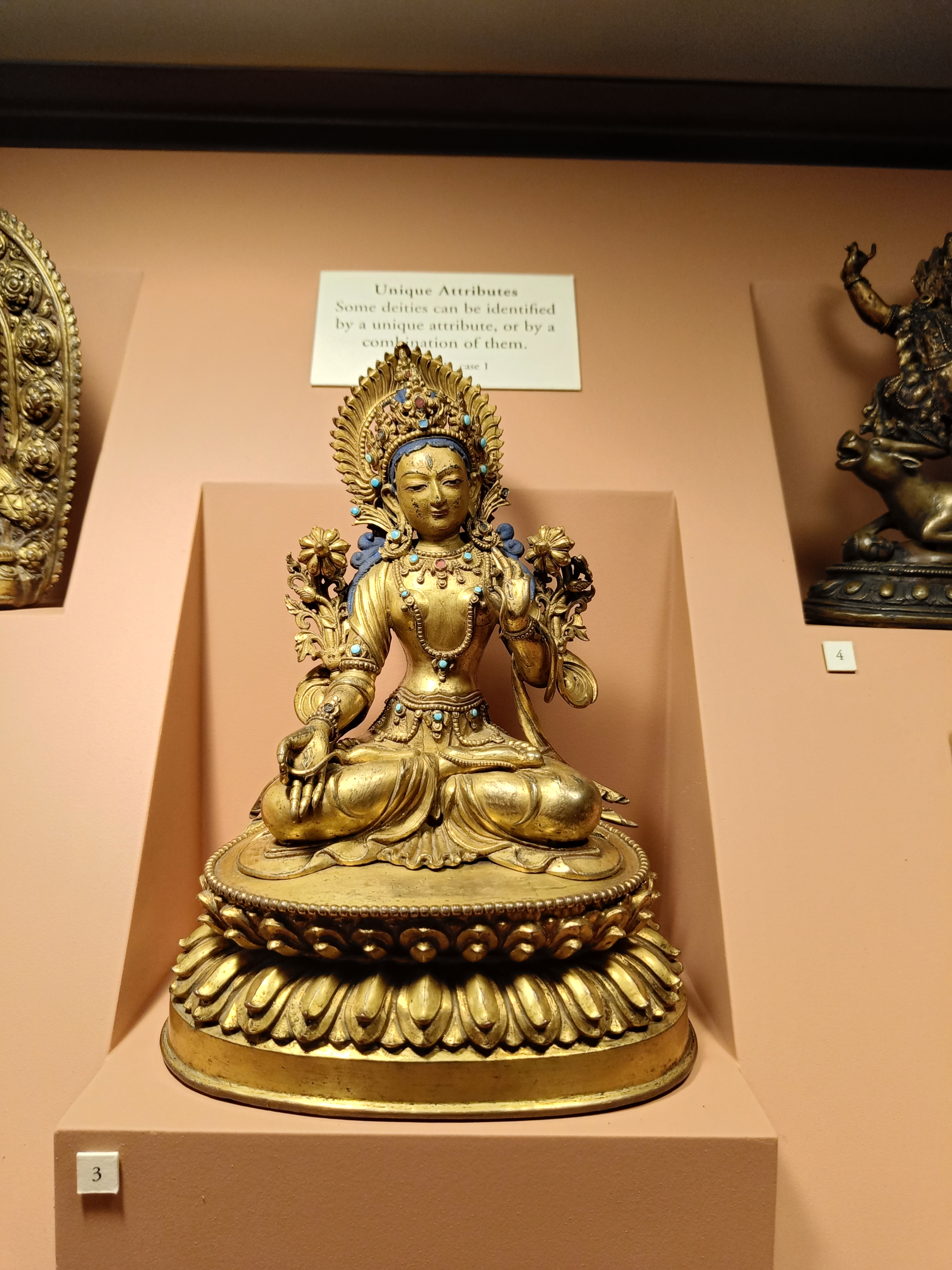
White Tara, Tibet, 17th-18th century

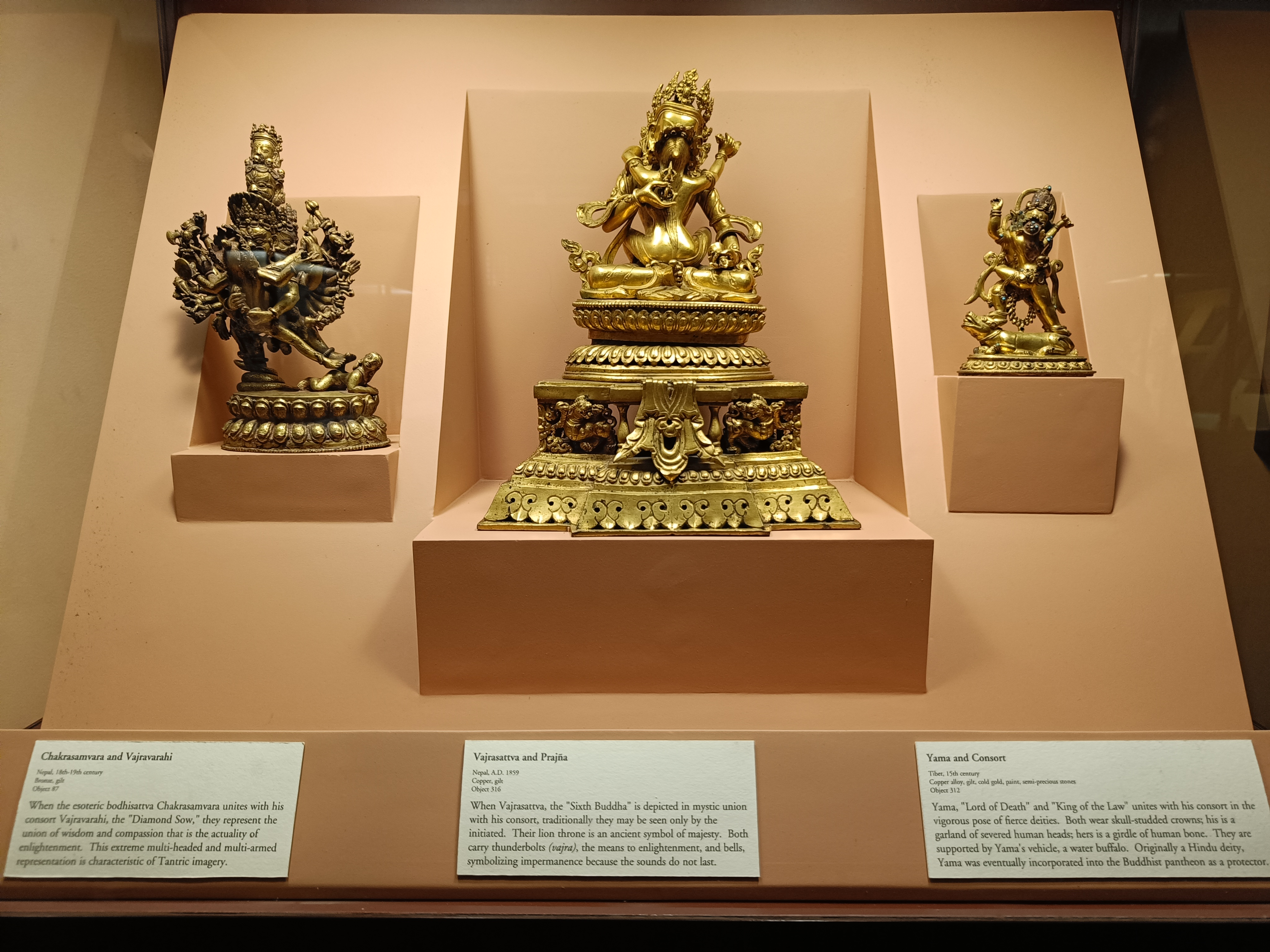
Chakrasamvara, Vajrasattva and Yama in unison with their consorts

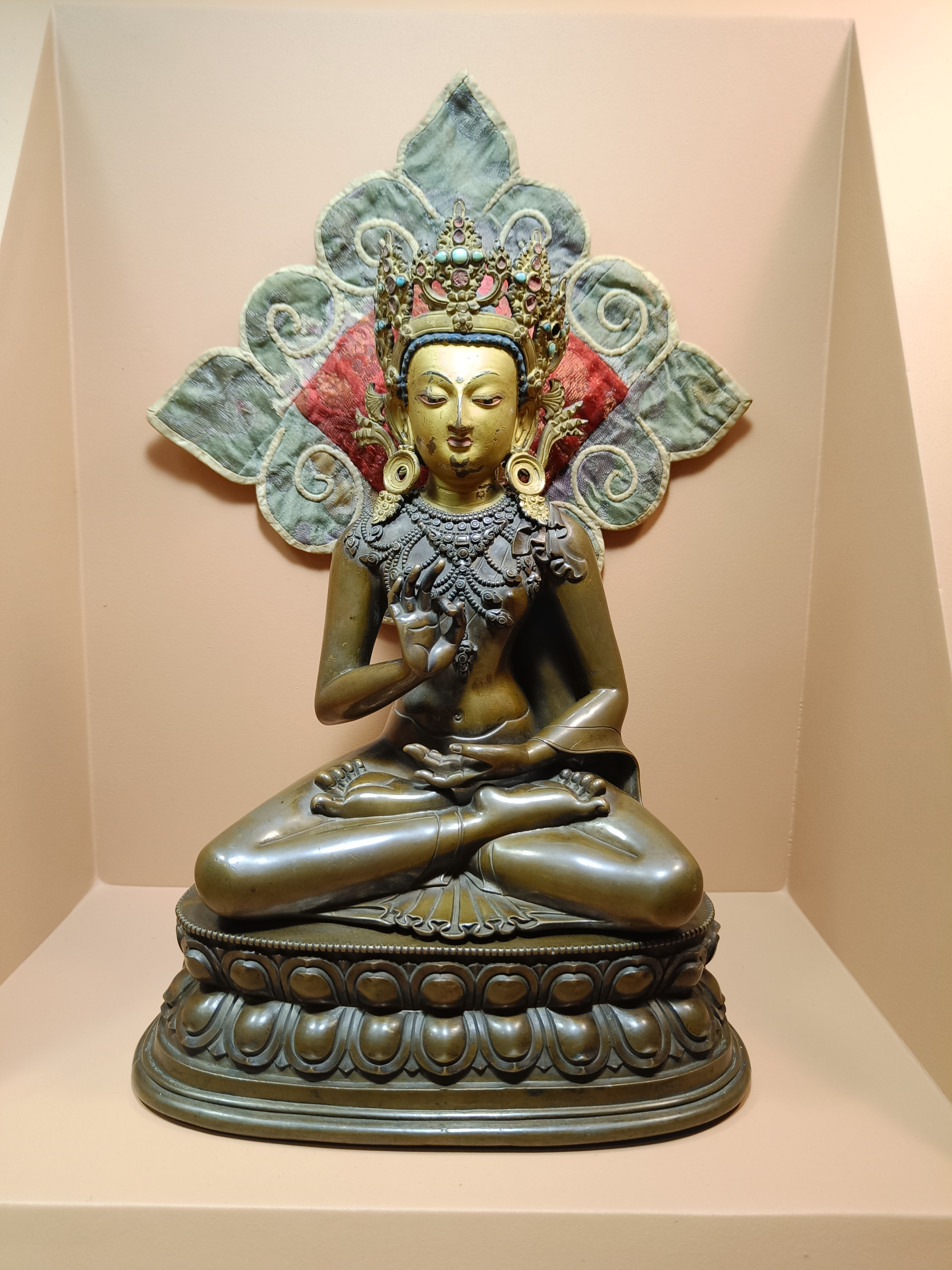
Amoghasiddhi, Tibet, 17th-18th century

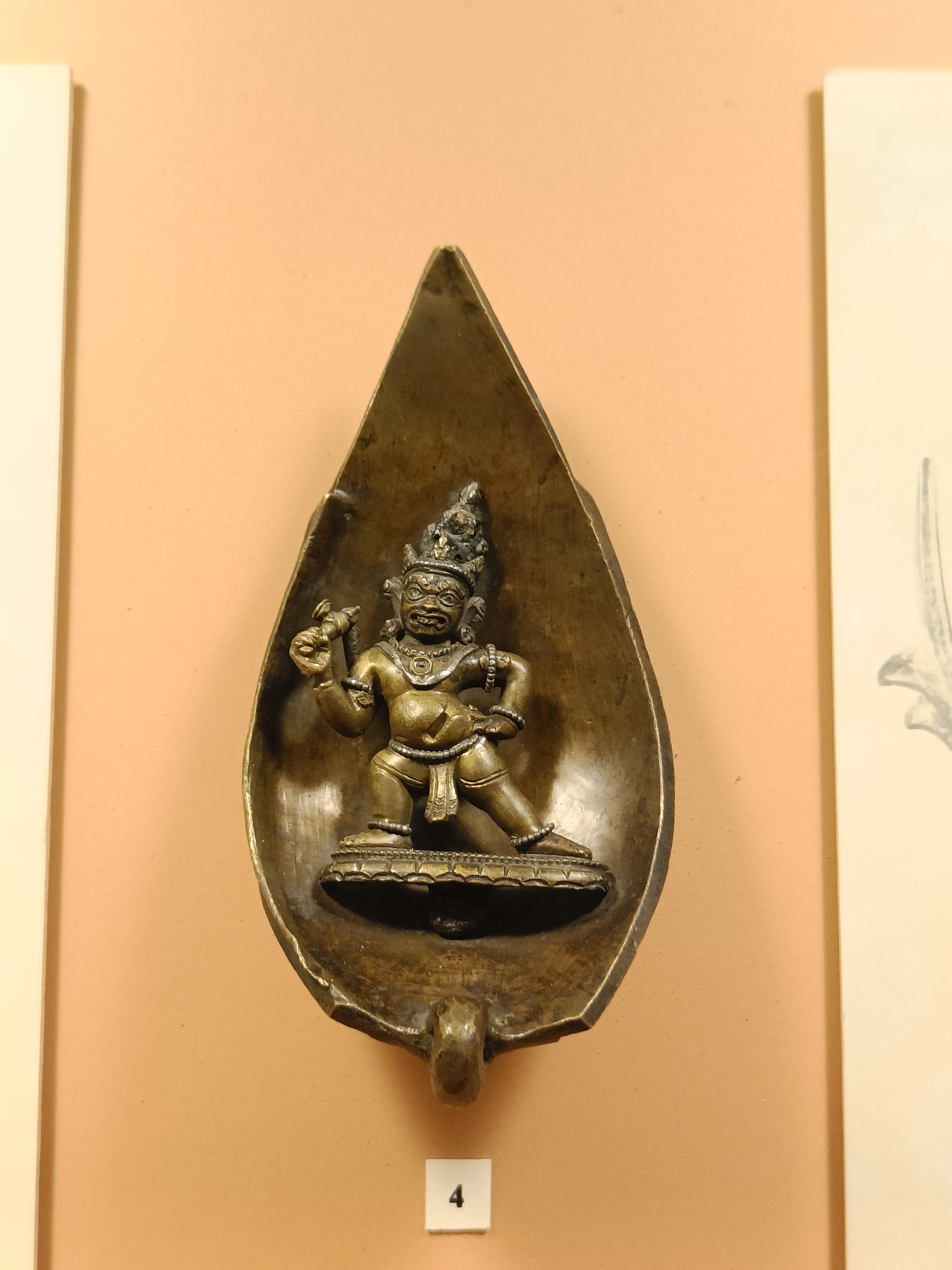
Petal of Lotus with Vajrapani, Northern India, 12th-13th century

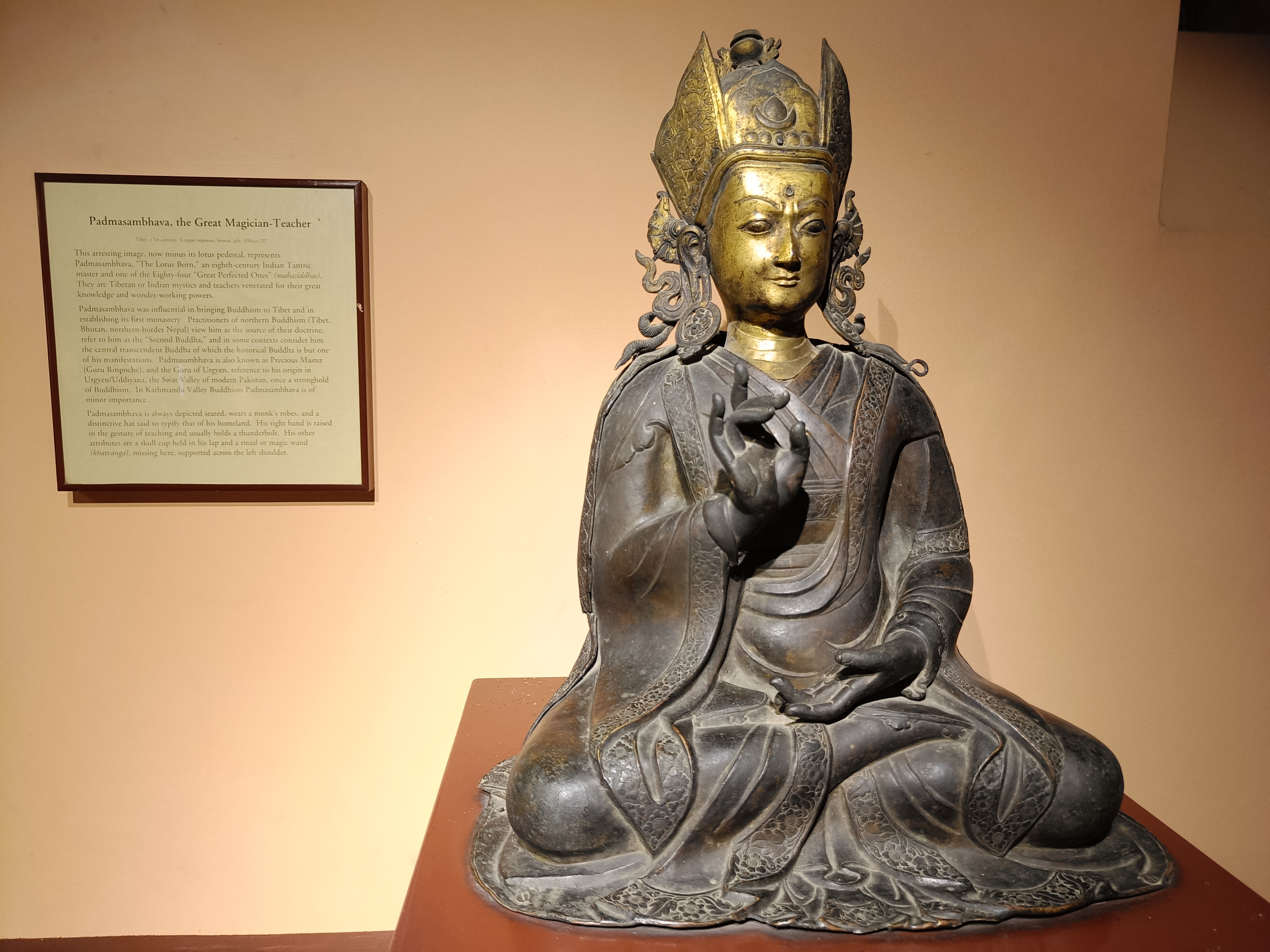
Padmasambhava

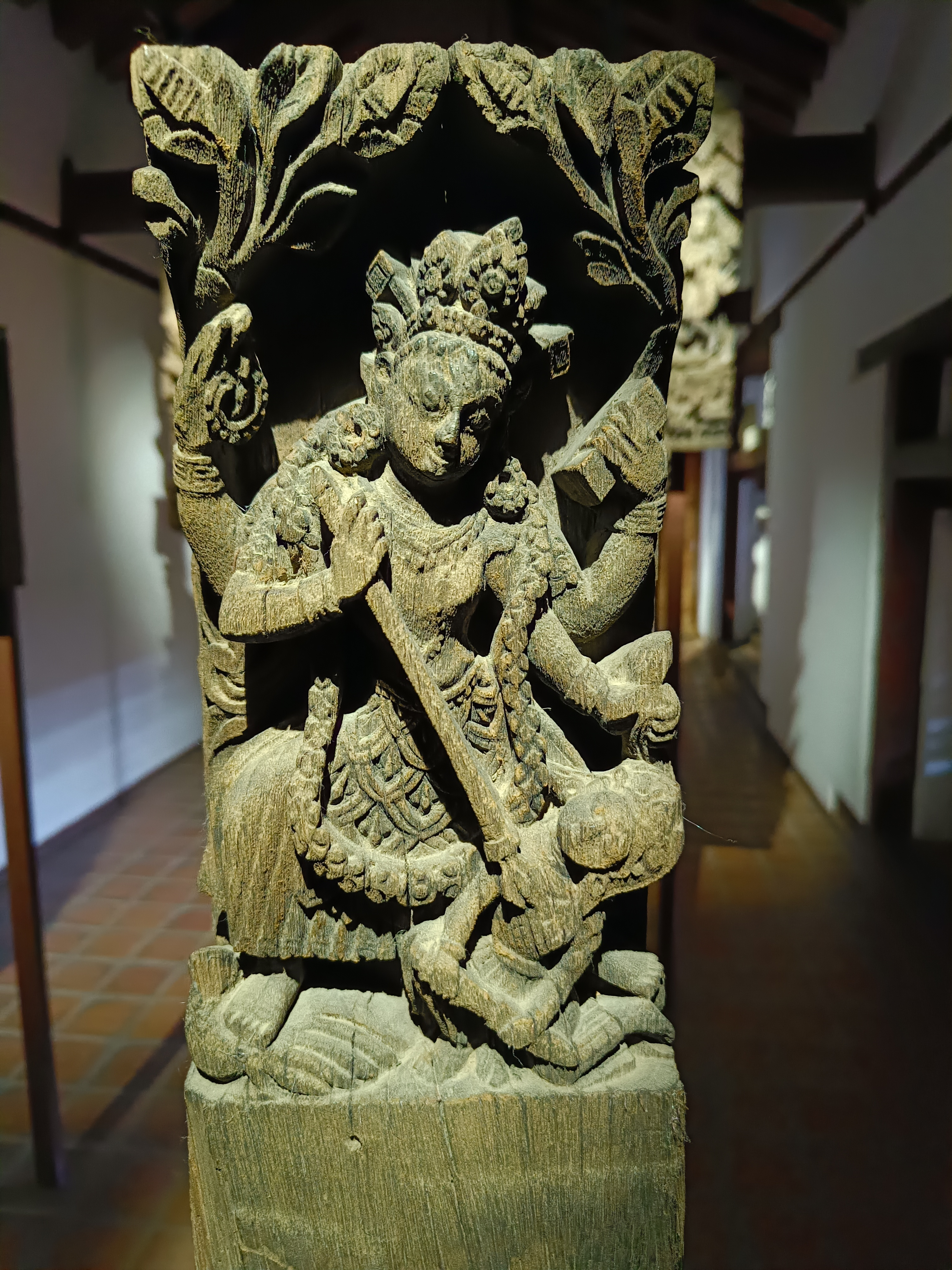
Carving of deity on wooden pillar

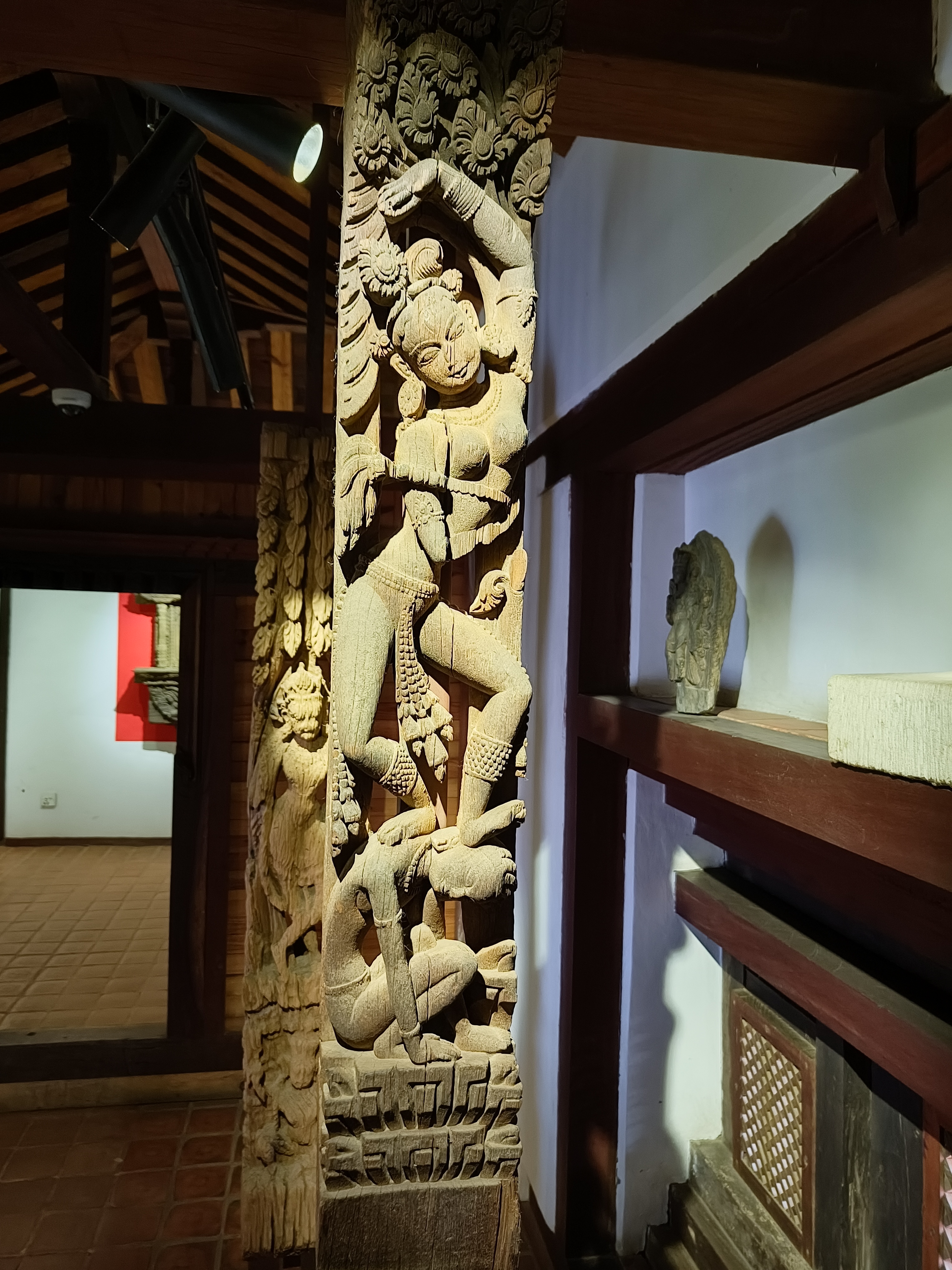
Carving of deity on wooden pillar

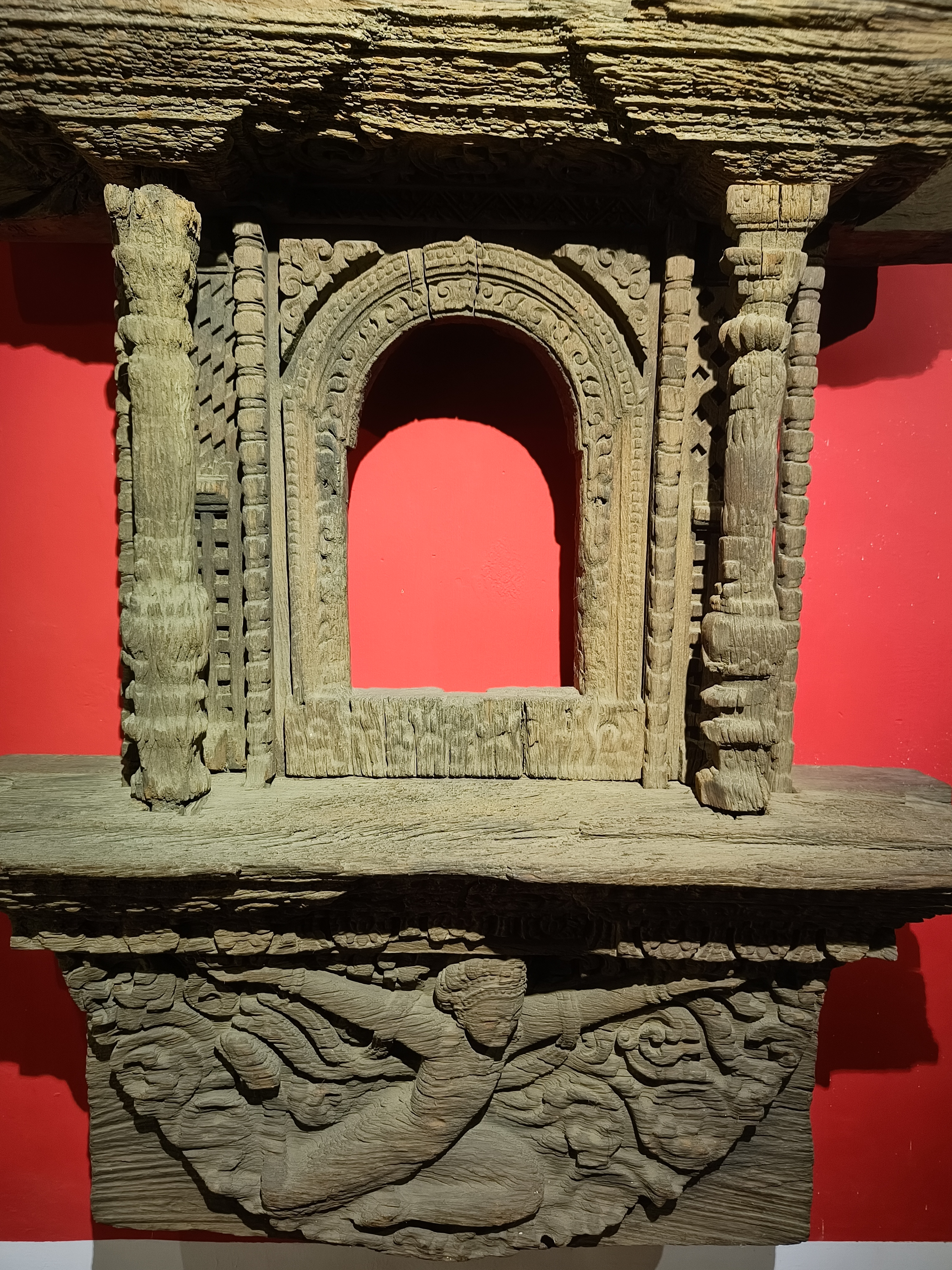
Nepalese wooden window with carvings

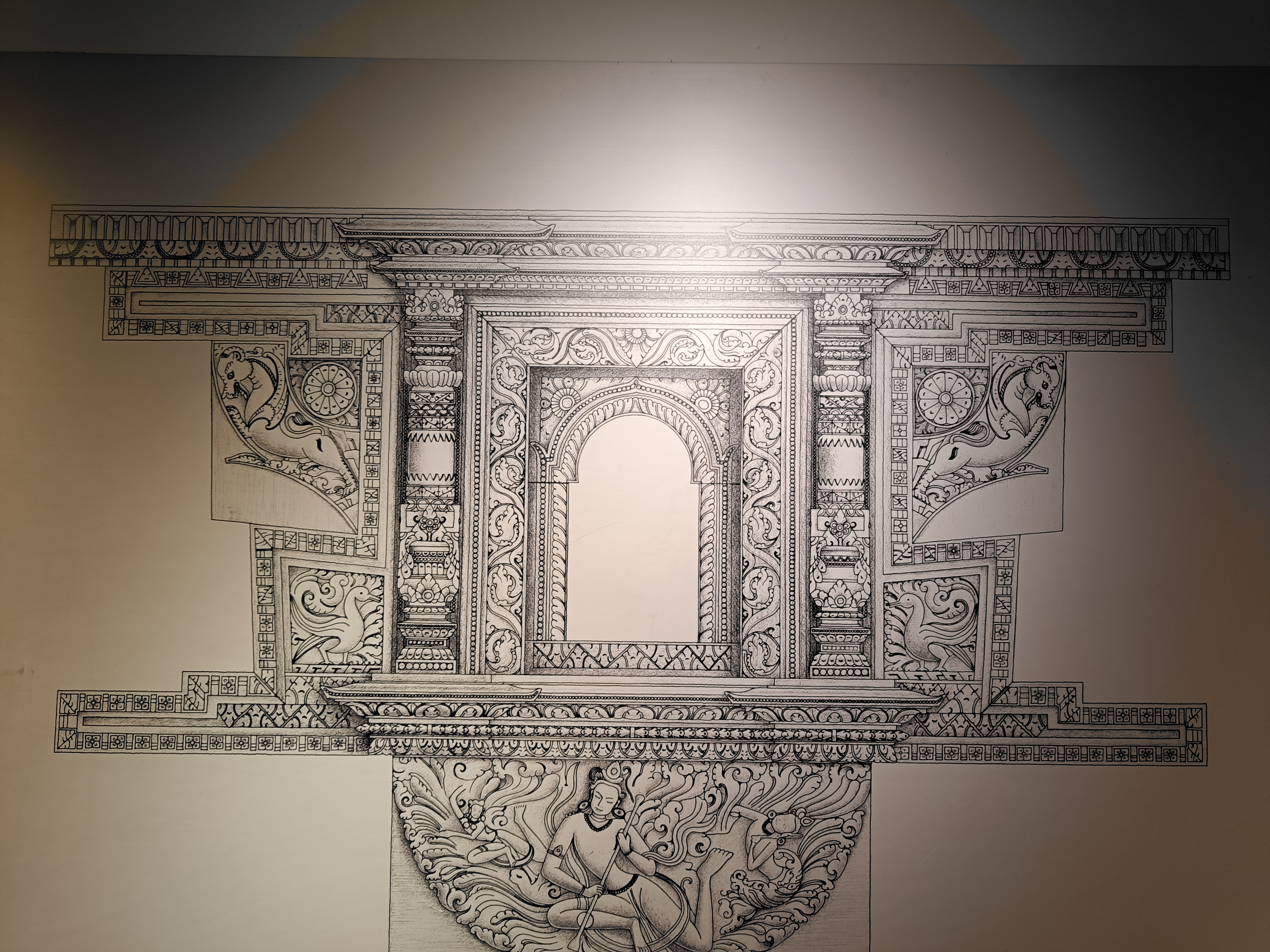
Sketch of Nepalese style of window with carvings

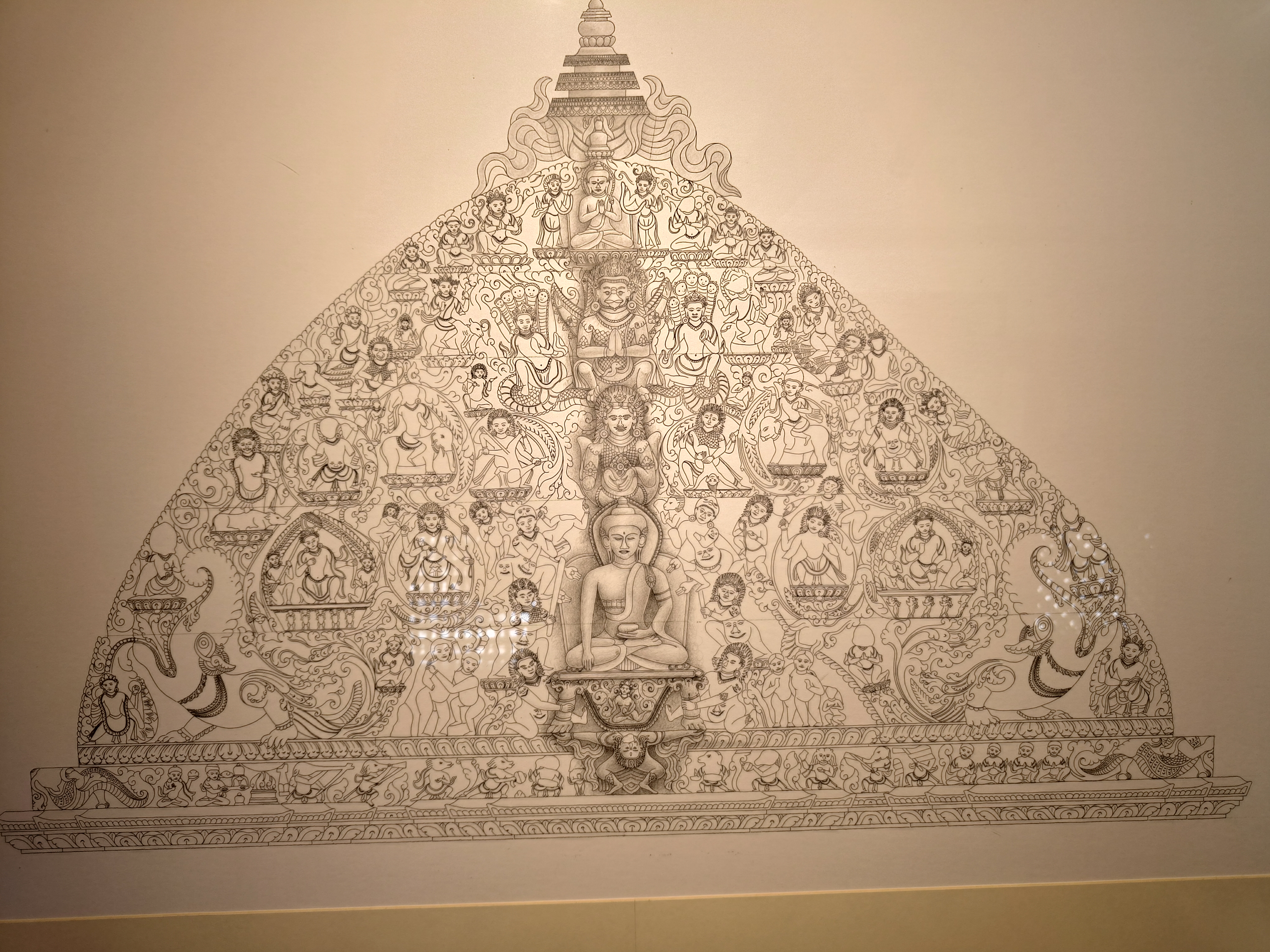
87 figures and items related to buddhism

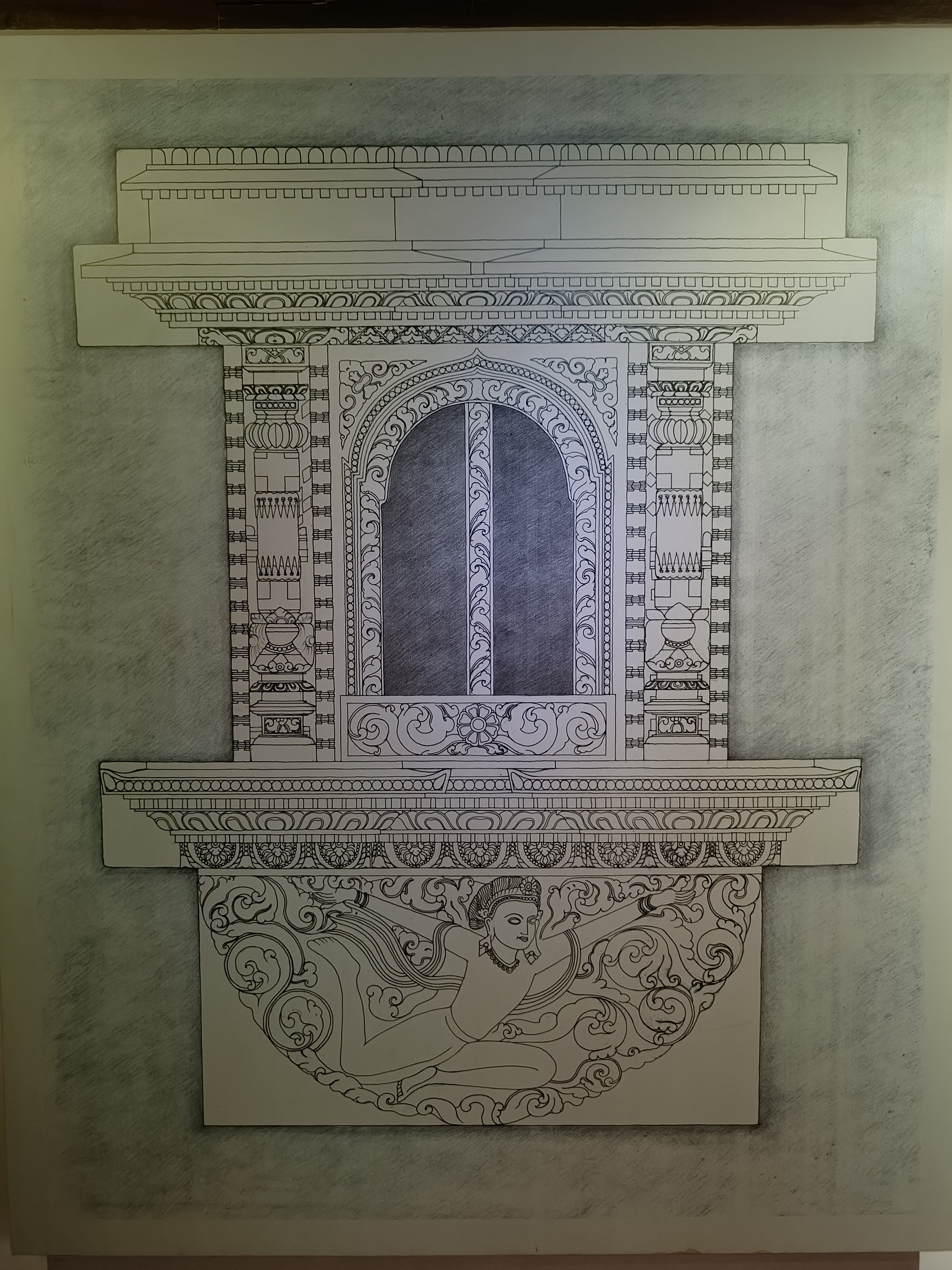
Sketch of wooden window with carvings

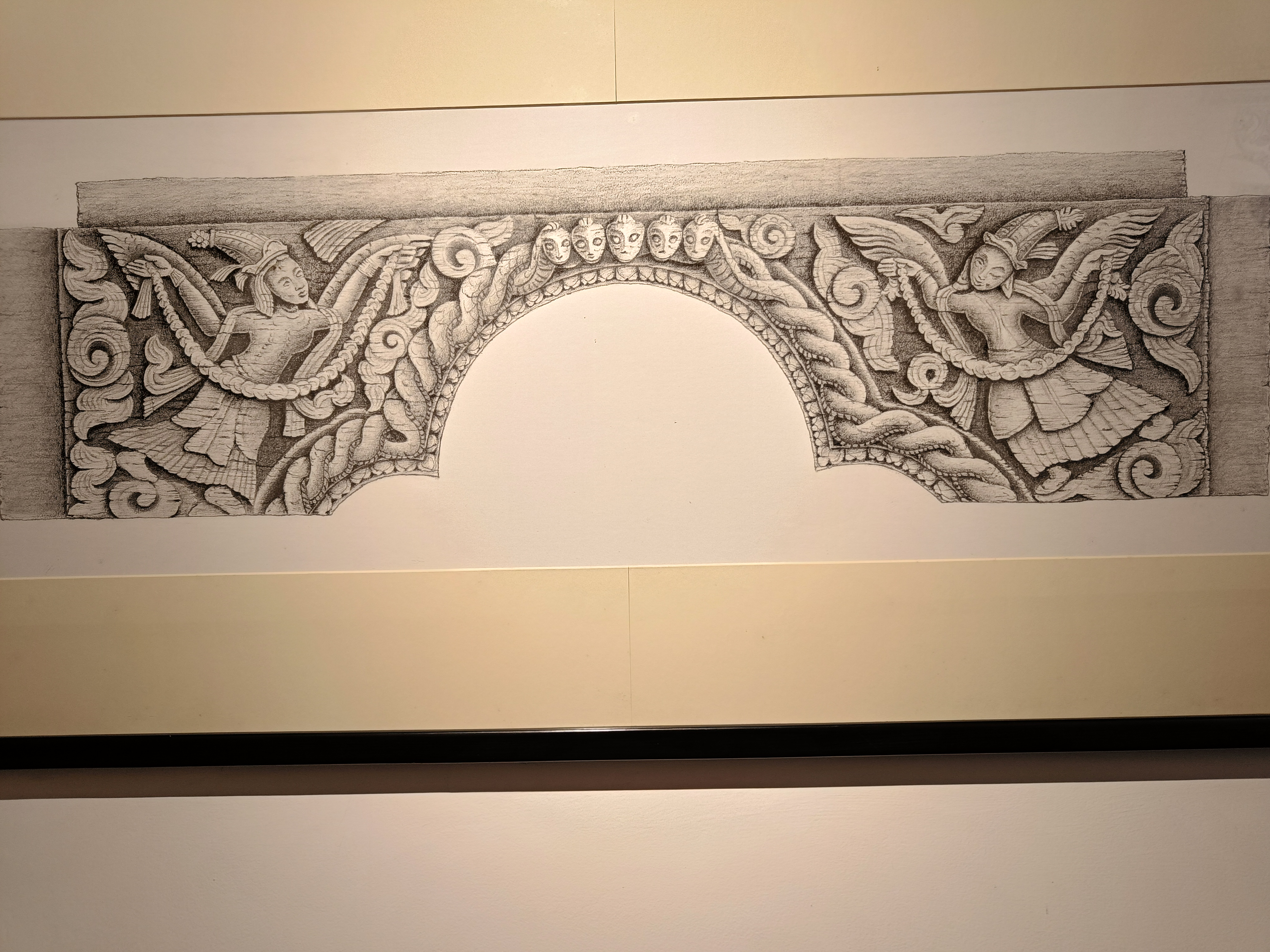
Sketch depicting Nepalese wood carving

== See also ==
- List of museums in Nepal
- National Museum of Nepal
- Taragaon Museum
