= T. A. S. Menon =

Indian artist

T.A Sukumara Menon
- Born: Edappally, Kerala, India
- Occupations: Artist, former principal of the raja ravi varma college of fine arts, Mavelikara, Kerala, India
- Spouse: Jayalakshmi
- Children: Hareesh Menon (Artist), Girish Menon, Gayathri Menon

T.A.S Menon is former principal of the Raja Ravi Varma College of Fine Arts Mavelikara, Kerala, India. He is a former executive member of the Kerala Lalita Kala Akademi, former jury member of the Raja Ravi Varma Award, former executive member of the Kerala Kalamandalam, Examination board chief of the institute of Mural painting (Mammiyur Krishnan Kutty Nair Smarakam), and a patron of the Narendra Prasad foundation.

== See also ==
- Raja Ravi Varma College of Fine Arts
- Kerala Lalita Kala Akademi
- Kerala Kalamandalam
