= Harikrishna =

Harikrishna or Hari Krishna is an Indian name. It may refer to:

- Nandamuri Harikrishna, Indian politician from the Telugu Desam Party in Andhra Pradesh and Telugu film actor
- Pentala Harikrishna, Indian chess player
- V. Harikrishna, music director and singer in the Kannada film industry
- Harikrishna Pathak, a Gujarati poet, short story writer, editor.
- Harikrishna Prasad Gupta, a poet

== See also ==
- Hare Krishna (disambiguation)
