= CRACK International Art Camp =

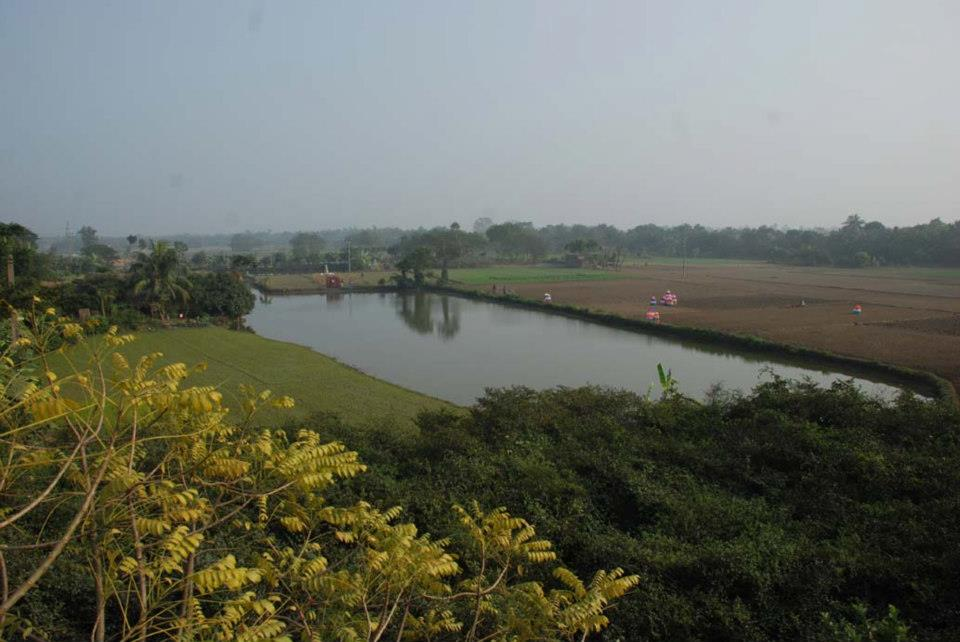
- Smaran Matshya Beej Khamar, the camp space
- Status: Active
- Genre: Art camp
- Frequency: Annual
- Venue: Smaran Matshya Beej Khamar
- Locations: Rahimpur, Kushtia
- Coordinates: 23.888°N 89.135°E
- Country: Bangladesh
- Inaugurated: December 23, 2007
- Founders: Shawon Akand, Delowar Hossain
- Most recent: December 31, 2015
- Area: International
- Major events: Installation art; Environmental art; Music sessions; Mixed media; Found object; Fire art
- Leader: Shawon Akand
- Organiser: CRACK Bangladesh
- Website: crackbd.org

CRACK International Art Camp (CIAC) is a multi-disciplinary art camp arranged every year over several days in Smaran Matshya Beej Khamar, a fish seed farm in Rahimpur, Kushtia, Bangladesh. The purpose of the outdoor art camp is promoting inter-disciplinary art collaborations. It was launched in 2007 by artist and researcher Shawon Akand, along with artist Delowar Hossain as Crack International Art Camp.

The art camp tries to blur the lines between creative disciplines and therefore engages people from various disciplines, including but not limited to theatre activists, photographers, film makers, musicians, psychologists, singers, poets, writers, journalists, actors, anthropologists, folklorists, historians, and art critics.

In 2009, Centre for Research on Art and Culture (CRAC), a research based organization of Bangladesh, took over the total responsibility of this Art Camp renaming it as CRAC International Art Camp. In 2012, CRACK Bangladesh, a not for profit organization, took over the all responsibility of the art camp. In 2014, CRACK Bangladesh became CRACK Trust.

== History ==
=== 1st edition: 2007 ===
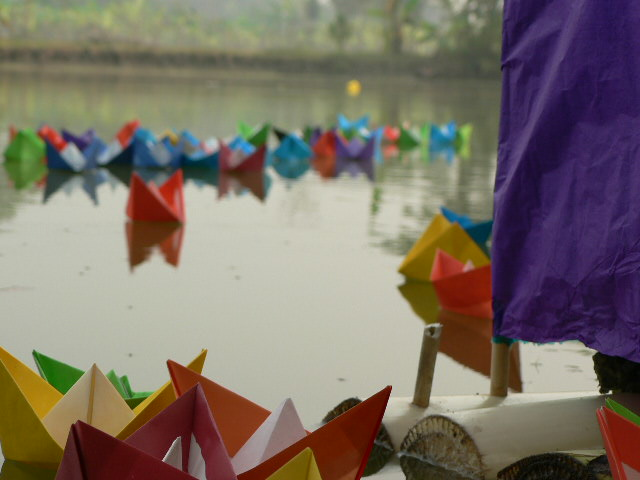
2007

Curated by Shawon Akand (Bangladesh). Participants included Shawon Akand, Saria Mahima, Delwar Hossain, Rajib Ashraf, Polash Chowdhury, Mahbubur Rahman, Suman Guha, Ovijit Das, Tanzim Ahmed Bijoy, Tania Tun Noor, Fahim Ferdous, Anamika Joly and Ananta Kumar Das. All from Bangladesh.

=== 2nd edition: 2008 ===
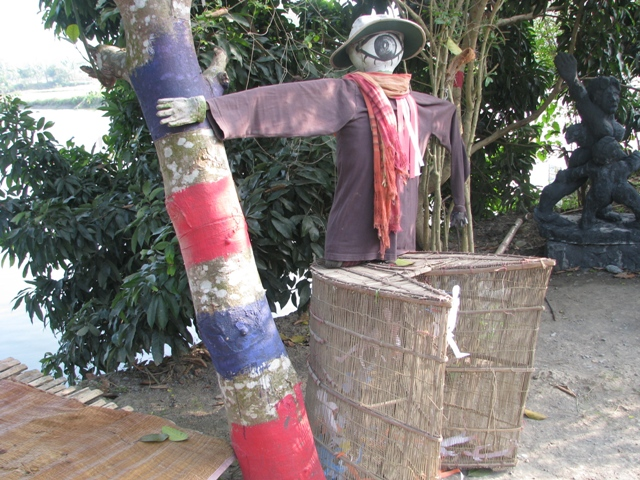
2008

Curated by Shawon Akand (Bangladesh). Participants included Shawon Akand, Saria Mahima, Delwar Hossain, Karishma Chowdhury, Polash Chowdhury, Lubna Charya, Tanzim Ahmed Bijoy, Shiek Sabbir Alam and Han Raggie.

=== 3rd edition: 2009 ===
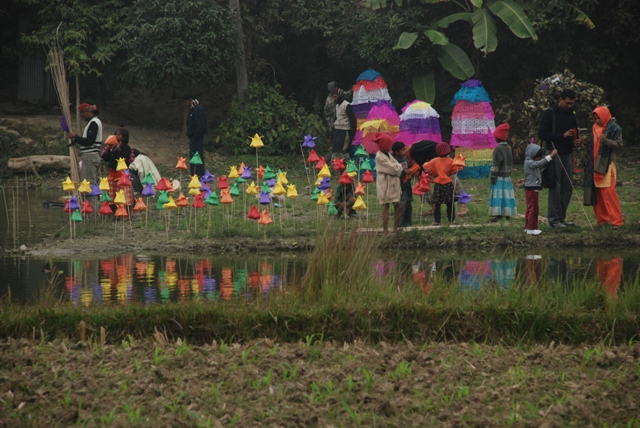
2009

Curated by Shawon Akand. Participants included Manash Acharya (India), Tapati Chowdhury (India), Andrew James Eagle (Australia), and several artists from Bangladesh — Shawon Akand, Delwar Hossain, Polash Chowdhury, Tanzim Ahmed Bijoy, Shiek Sabbir Alam, Abdus Salam, Joya Shareen Haque, ASM Sayeem, Tanjina Khanam, Shahriar Shaon, Raihan Rafi, Shaswati Majumdar, Taimur Reza, Maksuda Shopna, Ananta Kumar Das.

=== 4th edition: 2010 ===
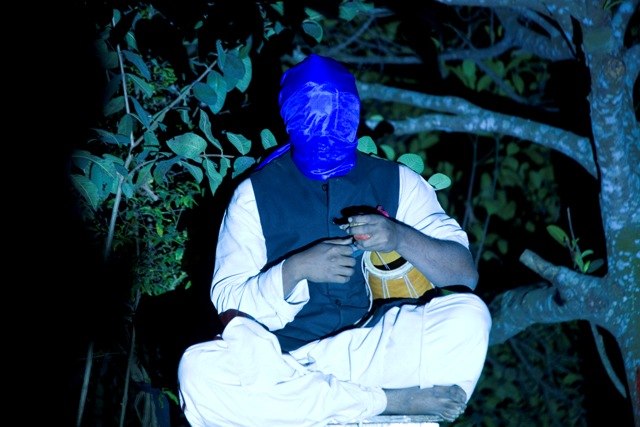
2010

Curated by Shawon Akand. Participants included Manash Acharya (India), Syed Taufiq Riaz (India), Shondip Samaddar (India), and several artists from Bangladesh — Kanak Aditya, Rahul Ananda, Shawon Akand, Delwar Hossain, Polash Chowdhury, Tanzim Ahmed Bijoy, Shiek Sabbir Alam, Abdus Salam, Joya Shahrin Haque, ASM Sayeem, Tanjina Khanam, Abu Naser Robi, Polash Chokroborty, Maksuda Shopna, Shonjoy Chakroborti, Sumana, Anata Kumar Das, Waheduzzaman, Ashifuzzaman.

=== 5th edition: 2011 ===
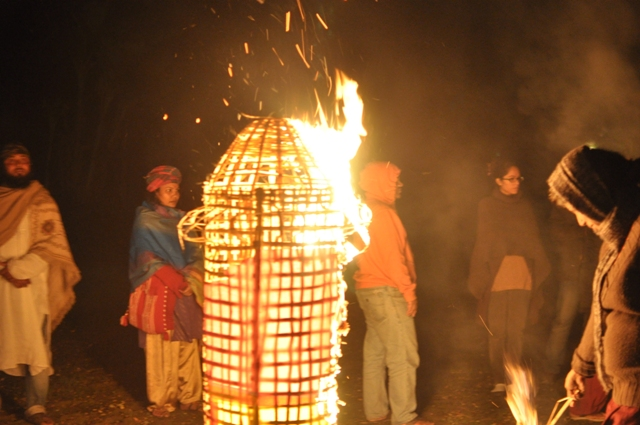
2011

Curated by Rahul Ananda. Participants included Satadru Savon Banduri, Koustav Nag and Debashish Barui from India, as well as Shawon Akand, Delwar Hossain, Polash Chowdhury, Tanzim Ahmed Bijoy, Shiek Sabbir Alam, Abdus Salam, Joya Shahrin Haque, ASM Sayeem, Tanjina Khanom, Kanak Aditya, Rahul Ananda, Mahbubur Rahman, Sadya Mizan, Rajon, Journal, Jem, Progga, Bonna, and Ananto Kumar Das from Bangladesh.

=== 6th edition: 2012 ===
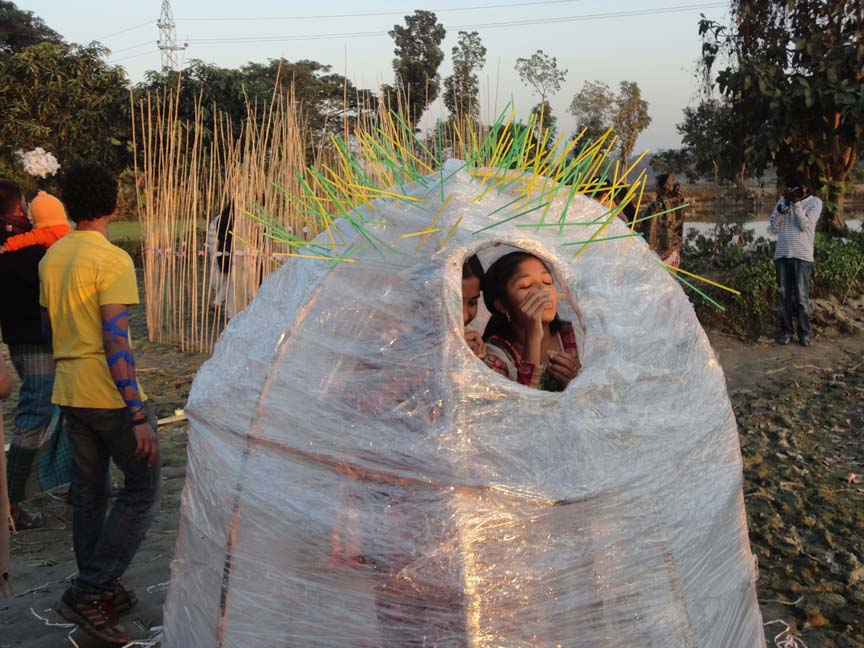
2012

Curated by Shawon Akand (Bangladesh) and Satadru Savon Bhanduri (India). Participants included Asmar Atham Atham (Sri Lanka), Aarthiee Kushawaha (India) Aishwaryan K (India), Imran Nafees Siddique (Pakistan), Ishan Pariyar (Nepal), Jaya Shankar Son Shrestha (Nepal), Marjan Safarzadeh (Iran), Rakesh Patel (India), Sabita Dangol (Nepal), Sameer Rao (India), Satadru Sovan Bhanduri (India), Shiblee Muneer (Pakistan), Sunil Sree (India), Tapati Chowdhury (India), Tayyaba Anwaar Ahmad (Pakistan), Vipul Prajapati (India) and 14 artists from Bangladesh — Delwar Hossain, Ananta Kumar Das, Polash Chowdhury, Anarja Tapos, Shakti Nomaan, Shaheen Mahmood Reza Rajon, Tanzim Ahmed Bijoy, Bizu Somoy, Afsana Sharmin Zhuma, Mazhar Ronni, Karishma Chowdhury, Rajib Ashraf, Sagor Zahid, Shawon Akand.

=== 7th edition: 2013 ===
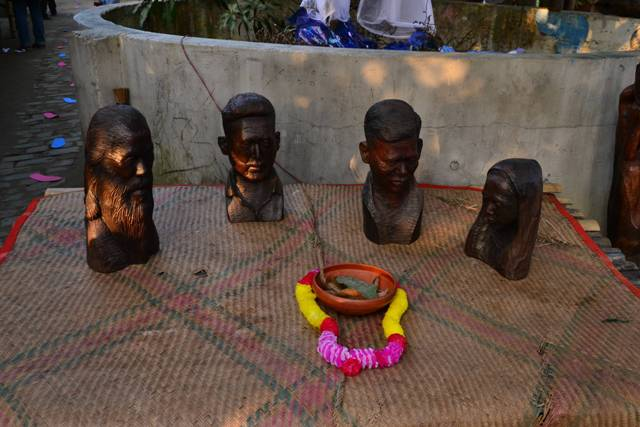
2013

Curated by Rahul Anand (Bangladesh). Participants included Sikan Kumar (India), Jeewan Suwal (Nepal), Polash Chowdhury (Bangladesh), Darrell Roberts (USA), atadru Sovan Bhanduri (India), Kanak Aditya (Bangladesh), Shakti Nomaan (Bangladesh), Prabin Shrestha (Nepal), Nilanjana Nandy (India), Rhine Bernardino from (the Philippines), Rahul Anand (Bangladesh), Santos Sigdel (Nepal), Pratap Morey (India), Raihan Ahmed Rafi (Bangladesh), Debasis Beura (India), Azmain Azad Katha (Bangladesh), Shegufta Sehnila Hena (Bangladesh), Koustav Nag (India), Saiful Islam Jarnal (Bangladesh), Murari Jha (India), Sadika Swarna (Bangladesh), Bhuvanesh Kumar (India), Tanzim Ahmed Bijoy (Bangladesh), and Shawon Akand (Bangladesh).

=== 8th edition: 2014 ===
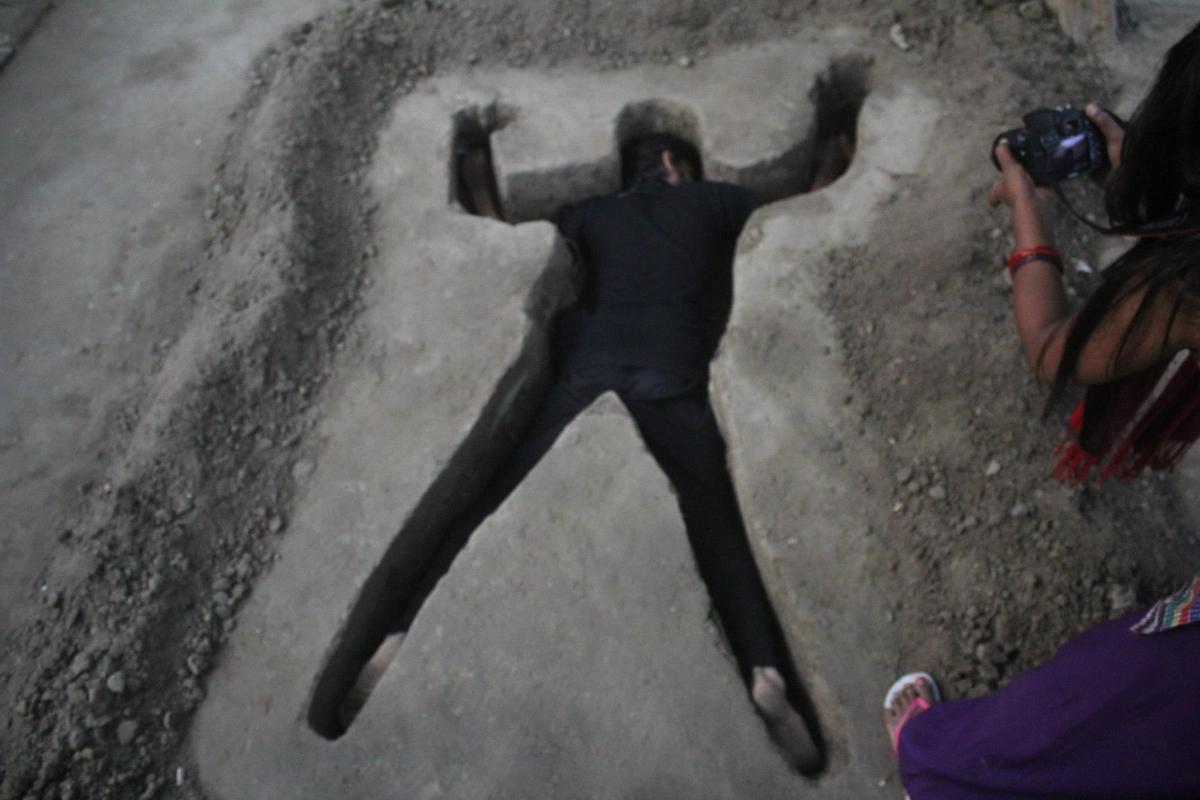
2014

Curated by Nilanjana Nandy (India). Participants included Ram Maharjan (Nepal), Riti Maharjan (Nepal), Sujan Dangol (Nepal), Anupam Singh (India), Cacilda Espindola (Brazil), Murari Jha (India), Razia Rezaie (Afghanistan), Satadru Sovan Bhanduri (India), Chirantan Mukhopadhyay (India), Gopa Roy (India), Jinal Sangoi (India), Dinesh Ishantha (Sri Lanka), Jinal Patel (India), and several artists from Bangladesh — they are Anadi Boiragi, Rahul Anand, Kanak Aditya, Mahadi Masud, Tahmina Hafiz Lisa, Polash Chowdhury, Shakti Nomaan, Shaheen Mahmood Reza Rajon, Saiful Jarnal, Azmain Azad Katha, Raihan Rafi, Afsana Sharmin Zhuma, Sadika Swarna, Delowar Hossain, Ananta Kumar Das, Tanzim Ahmed Bijoy, Anarja Tapos, ABS Xem and Shawon Akand.

=== 9th edition: 2015 ===
Curated by Tapati Chowdury (India). Participants included Ram Maharjan (Nepal), Ritesh Maharjan (Nepal), Anil Subba (Nepal), Chirantan Mukhopadhyay (India), Jyotirmoy Saha (India), Rajarshi Dasgupta (India), Erandi Chandima (Sri Lanka), Renu Bariwal (India), Srimoy Roy Chaudhury (India), Suman Majumder (India), Suresh K. Nair (India) and several artists from Bangladesh — Mahadi Masud, Tahmina Hafiz Lisa, Raihan Rafi and Farah Naz Moon.

=== 10th edition: 2016 ===
2016

Jointly curated by Rajarshi Das Gupta from India and Shawon Akand from Bangladesh. Participants included Anil Prajapati (Nepal), Bibhu Nath (India), Hiroko Tsukamoto (Japan), Kamal Pruthi (India), Mahesh Bastakoti (Nepal), Mariva Zacharof (Greece), Mohan Jangid (India), Muna Bhadel (Nepal), Pavitra Mehta (USA), Pramila Lama (Nepal), Rupsa Kundu (India), Sohini Sengupta (India) and from Bangladesh - Anadi Boiragi, Farah Naz Moon, Mahadi Masud, Mridul Kanti Goshami, Sultana Sharmin Akhi, Tahmina Hafiz Lisa and Zahid Hossain Sagor.

=== 18th Edition: 2024 ===
Artists from eight countries, including Bangladesh, participated in this edition. The curatorial responsibilities were carried out by Pakistani artist Imran Nafis Siddiqui. The participating artists included Felipe Alvarez (Argentina), Ursula Maria Probst (Austria), Ishrat Noor Qureshi (USA), Ayka Okay (Turkey), Sagun Thapa (Nepal), Om Prakash Shreej, Manu Kumar Chowdhury, Asif Hanif Shah, Shriparna, and Parmesh Jalad (India). From Bangladesh, the artists were Kiriti Saha, Sadia Khalid Reeti, Farzana Ahmed Urmi, Mahbuba Mehjabin Hasan, Tanvir Ahmed Joy, Md. Khairul Hasan, Md. Fariaz Imran, Pulak Sarkar, Tanzima Khanam, S.M. Sayem Hossain, Poli Laila, and Kausar Mia.
