= Hari Krishnan =

Hari Krishnan or Harikrishnan may refer to:

- Guru Har Krishan, also known as Hari Krishnan, a Sikh guru
- Hari Krishnan (Tamil actor)
- Harikrishnan (Malayalam actor)
- Harikrishnan G.

== See also ==
- Hare Krishna (disambiguation)
