= Singh Is Kinng =

2008 Indian film by Anees Bazmee

- Theatrical release poster
- Directed by: Anees Bazmee
- Screenplay by: Anees Bazmee; Suresh Nair
- Story by: Anees Bazmee
- Produced by: Vipul Amrutlal Shah
- Starring: Akshay Kumar; Katrina Kaif; Om Puri; Ranvir Shorey; Neha Dhupia; Javed Jaffrey; Sonu Sood; Kirron Kher
- Cinematography: Sanjay F. Gupta; Ben Nott
- Edited by: Amitabh Shukla; Prashant Singh Rathore
- Music by: Songs: Pritam; RDB; Background Score: Salim–Sulaiman
- Production companies: Adlabs Films; Hari Om Entertainment; Blockbuster Movie Entertainers
- Distributed by: Indian Films; BIG Pictures
- Release date: 8 August 2008
- Running time: 136 minutes
- Country: India
- Languages: Hindi; Punjabi

Singh Is Kinng is a 2008 Indian Hindi-language action comedy film directed by Anees Bazmee from a screenplay by Bazmee and Suresh Nair. The film stars Akshay Kumar, Katrina Kaif, Om Puri, Ranvir Shorey, Neha Dhupia, Javed Jaffrey, Sonu Sood, Kirron Kher, and Sudhanshu Pandey. In the film, Happy Singh (Kumar) is sent to Australia to reunite Lakhanpal Singh (Sood), a crime boss, with his ill father but finds himself facing love and trouble instead. The film also featured a song and a music video with American rapper Snoop Dogg.

A major part of the film was shot in Australia. The film marked the fourth collaboration of Kumar and Kaif after Humko Deewana Kar Gaye (2006), Namastey London (2007) and Welcome (2007). The spelling of the word "king" in the film's title with an additional letter "n" was based on advice provided by a numerologist.

Singh Is Kinng was released on 8 August 2008 with mixed to positive critical reception. It became a huge commercial success, earning ₹136 crore worldwide, thus becoming the third-highest grossing Hindi film of 2008. At the 3rd Asian Film Awards, Singh Is Kinng received 1 nomination – Best Actor (Kumar). Moreover, at the 54th Filmfare Awards, the film won Best Female Playback Singer (Shreya Ghoshal for "Teri Ore"), in addition to a nomination for Best Actor (Kumar).

The film spawned a standalone quasi-sequel Singh Is Bliing (2015) also starring Kumar in the lead role.

== Plot ==
Lakhanpal 'Lucky' Singh, also known as the 'Kinng', is the most powerful figure in the Australian criminal underworld. He is accompanied by his Sikh mafia associates: Julie, Mika (Lucky's younger brother), Pankaj Udaas, Raftaar Mann, Dilbagh Singh and Gurbaksh Singh. Meanwhile, in Lucky's birthplace of Punjab, Happy Singh, a well-meaning troublemaker, is sent on a mission to Australia with his friend Rangeela. The aim is to bring Lucky back and reunite him with his ill father, in the hope that Happy will be out of the way for a while.

However, at the airport, their tickets are swapped with those of Puneet, who is heading to Egypt. Consequently, Happy and Rangeela find themselves in Egypt, where Happy meets and falls in love with a lawyer named Sonia. However, they part ways before he can express his feelings. The two then proceed to Australia, where Lucky dismisses Happy's request to return to Punjab and throws him out. Stranded, Happy is kind to an elderly lady, who offers him food despite him being a stranger.

A series of incidents instigated by Happy leave Lucky severely injured and paralysed. Surprisingly, Happy is then made the new king by Lucky's associates, who have misinterpreted Lucky's intention to kill him — much to Lucky's dismay. An elderly woman who helped Happy reveals that her daughter is returning from Egypt with her wealthy fiancé, Puneet. She is concerned that her daughter will find out that they are now living in poverty following her father's death. Happy offers the woman and her daughter a place to stay in Lucky's mansion and employs the mafia associates to work for them. When the daughter arrives, Happy is shocked to discover that she is Sonia. Although she begins to fall for Happy, Sonia is conflicted because of her relationship with Puneet, who becomes increasingly suspicious of Happy. Inspired by Happy's kindness, the members of Lucky's gang gradually reform their lives. Puneet eventually learns Happy's true identity as the King of the Underworld and shares this information with Sonia. Initially shocked, Sonia is later convinced by her mother, Rangeela, and the gang members that Happy only wants to see others happy and at peace. Meanwhile, Puneet conspires with Mika, who wants to become king himself, to kill Happy. Their motives differ: Puneet wants to kill Happy in order to keep Sonia, while Mika wants to seize power.

On the day of Sonia and Puneet's wedding, Happy and his associates crash the event, resulting in a confrontation with Mika's henchmen. Amidst the chaos, Puneet abandons Sonia in order to save himself, enabling Happy to take his place at the altar and unwittingly marry her. Puneet later seeks forgiveness as his father takes him away. Meanwhile, Mika's guard tries to kill Lucky, but the trauma he suffers as a result cures his paralysis. Realising Mika's betrayal, Lucky is heartbroken.

As the confrontation escalates, Mika, wearing special glasses and a hearing aid, prepares to shoot Happy, but Lucky intervenes. A tense standoff ensues, during which Happy counsels Mika on the attributes of a true Sikh. Lucky confesses that being King was a source of misery for him because a true King fights for others, not himself. Feeling remorseful, Mika drops his weapon. The film concludes with the wedding of Happy and Sonia and the gang members returning to their village, where they find peace and redemption. The final image shows Lucky reflecting: 'And that's how they became real Singhs and real Kinnigs.'

== Cast ==
- Akshay Kumar as Happy Singh
- Katrina Kaif as Lawyer Sonia Singh, Puneet's fiancée
- Om Puri as Rangeela Mann
- Ranvir Shorey as Puneet Sabarwal, Sonia's fiancé
- Jaaved Jaaferi as Mika Singh (Lucky's younger brother) and Mr. Param Sabarwal, Puneet's father (Dual Role)
- Neha Dhupia as Julie Gupta
- Sonu Sood as Lakhanpal "Lucky" Singh (Mika's older brother) / Ungli Baba
- Kirron Kher as Mrs. Rose Singh (Sonia's mother)
- Kamal Chopra as Guruji Gurbaksh Singh
- Sudhanshu Pandey as Raftaar Mann
- Yashpal Sharma as Pankaj Udaas
- Satwant Kaur as Mika and Lucky's mother
- Manoj Pahwa as Dilbagh Singh
- Gurpreet Ghuggi as Manjeet
- Snoop Dogg as himself
- Chayan Sarkar as Man at Airport
- Gleven Roy Abugan as himself
- Tyson Bradly as DJ
- Khyali Saharan as groom
- Sanchita Choudary as Tanya Singh
- Moksha Rana as Little Blind Girl

== Music ==
The music of the film was composed by Pritam Chakraborty and the lyrics were written by Mayur Puri. The title song was composed by the British band RDB. The soundtrack was launched officially at the IIFA Awards in Bangkok on 8 June 2008.

Snoop Dogg has a cameo in the video of the title song.

Shreya Ghoshal, who sang the song "Teri Ore," won the Filmfare Award for Best Female Playback Singer and the IIFA Award for Best Female Playback Singer. Mayur Puri was nominated for the Star Screen Awards, in the "Best Lyrics" category, for the same song. According to the Indian trade website Box Office India, with around 1,800,000 units sold, this film's soundtrack album was the year's third highest-selling.

The song "Bhootni Ke" used in the film is sung by Mika Singh.

Singh Is Kinng

Soundtrack album by Pritam Chakraborty
- Released: 8 June 2008
- Genre: Feature film soundtrack
- Length: 0:51.94
- Label: Junglee Music
- Producer: Vipul Shah

Pritam Chakraborty chronology
Kismat Konnection (2008)	Singh Is Kinng (2008)	Kidnap (2008)

RDB chronology
Namastey London (2007)	Singh Is Kinng (2008)

=== Track listing ===
No.	Title	Singer(s)	Length
1.	"Singh Is Kinng"	Snoop Dogg, RDB, Akshay Kumar	04:55
2.	"Jee Karda"	Suzanne D'Mello, Labh Janjua	04:51
3.	"Bas Ek Kinng"	Mika Singh, Neeraj Shridhar, Hard Kaur, Ashish Pandit	04:41
4.	"Teri Ore"	Shreya Ghoshal, Rahat Fateh Ali Khan	05:40
5.	"Bhootni Ke"	Daler Mehndi	05:08
6.	"Talli Hua"	Labh Janjua, Neeraj Shridhar	04:50
7.	"Bas Ek Kinng" (Tiger Style Mix)	Mika Singh, Neeraj Shridhar, Hard Kaur, Ashish Pandit	04:04
8.	"Bhootni Ke" (Tiger Style Mix)	Mika Singh	04:46
9.	"Talli Hua" (Jay Dabhi Mix)	Labh Janjua, Neeraj Shridhar, Stylebhai	04:33
10.	"Jee Karda" (Remix)	Suzanne D'Mello, Labh Janjua	04:52
11.	"Teri Ore" (Lounge Remix)	Shreya Ghoshal, Rahat Fateh Ali Khan	06:09
12.	"Bhootni Ke" (Remix)	Daler Mehndi	03:54
Total length:			58:23

== Reception ==
=== Critical response ===
Taran Adarsh of Bollywood Hungama gave the film 4 out of 5 stars, and stated "Singh Is Kinng lives up to the hype and hoopla. At the box-office, the film will fetch a hurricane-like start and will be record-shattering. Notwithstanding the new oppositions in the weeks to come, it will rule the hearts of the aam junta. Blockbuster Hit!" Times of India gave the film 3 out of 5 stars, and stated "The film has an entertaining first half. The second half does get cluttered, clumsy and loose with loads of wasted talent in the likes of Ranvir Shorey, Javed Jaffrey and a side-lined Om Puri." Gaurav Malani of Economic Times stated, "This king doesn't quite rule your heart unconditionally." Rajeev Masand gave the film 2 out of 5 stars, and stated "Singh is Kinng celebrates the spirit of being a Sikh, and yet it completely disregards the most basic detail of Sikh identity – how can your Sikh characters sport turbans but not full beards?" Aseem Chhabra of Rediff.com gave the film 2.5 stars out of 5, and stated "Akshay is the Kinng". Lisa Tsering of Hollywood Reporter stated, "Singh Is Kinng is a rollicking late-night party you don't want to end - with a friendly, funny and generous host; gorgeous women; pumped-up bhangra music and an extravagant, booze-soaked scuffle or two." Shubhra Gupta of The Indian Express stated, "Whatever else it notches up, 'Singh Is Kinng' will always and forever be known as the first Hindi film in Punjabi : everyone talks as if sarson da saag is coming out of their mouths."

Amodini of Friday Nirvana gave the film 0 out of 5 stars, and stated that it was a "dumbed-down masala". Janak of Cinema Online Malaysia gave the film 5 out of 5 stars, and stated "Singh Is Kinng is a fantastic five-star movie with wonderful casts and beautiful songs. You may find all the elements of Hindi cinema in this film, from action to comedy, and drama to romance. This is a movie not to be missed, especially if you are a Punjabi and a Bollywood fan. I'm still buzzing from the soundtrack!" Wietske Uneken of Cinemagazine gave the film 3 stars out of 5 and stated, "Thanks to its humorous approach, 'Singh is Kinng' is an entertaining film." Sri of Frames N Pages stated, "The film lacks logic, but still a great entertainer." R. Paul Dhillon of Georgia Straight stated, "The filmmakers seem interested only in manipulating the audience, with absolutely no regard for plot, characters, or believability." Molodezhnaja gave the film 2.5 stars out of 5. Rachel Saltz of New York Times stated, "“Singh Is Kinng” isn’t a great movie. But the immensely likable Akshay Kumar shines as a Capraesque hero who spreads bedrock Indian values." Sonia Chopra of Sify gave the film 3 out of 5 stars, and stated "And there it is: yet another critic-proof film that the audience has pre-decided to like, such that you imagine them displaying the relevant finger to those who disagree."

=== Sikh controversy ===
Some members of the Sikh community had expressed their dissatisfaction over the portrayal of Sikhs in the movie. On 1 August 2008, the Delhi Sikh Gurdwara Management Committee (DSGMC) wrote a letter to Sheila Dikshit, the then Chief Minister of Delhi, asking her to ban the movie, as the trailer showed Akshay Kumar's character sporting a trimmed beard. According to their religious guidelines, male Sikhs should not trim their beards, and the DSGMC found this offensive. After negotiations with the DSGMC authorities, the film was given clearance on 7 August 2008.

== Awards and nominations ==
Award	Category	Recipients and nominees	Results
Asian Film Awards	Best Actor	Akshay Kumar	Nominated
Producers Guild Film Awards	Best Actor in a Leading Role	Akshay Kumar	Nominated
Filmfare Awards	Best Actor	Akshay Kumar	Nominated
Filmfare Awards	Best Female Playback Singer	Shreya Ghoshal for "Teri Ore"	Won
International Indian Film Academy Awards	Best Actress	Katrina Kaif	Nominated
International Indian Film Academy Awards	Best Female Playback Singer	Shreya Ghoshal for "Teri Ore"	Won
Screen Awards	Best Actor (Popular Choice)	Akshay Kumar	Won
