= Sabita Dangol =

Nepali artist (born 1984)

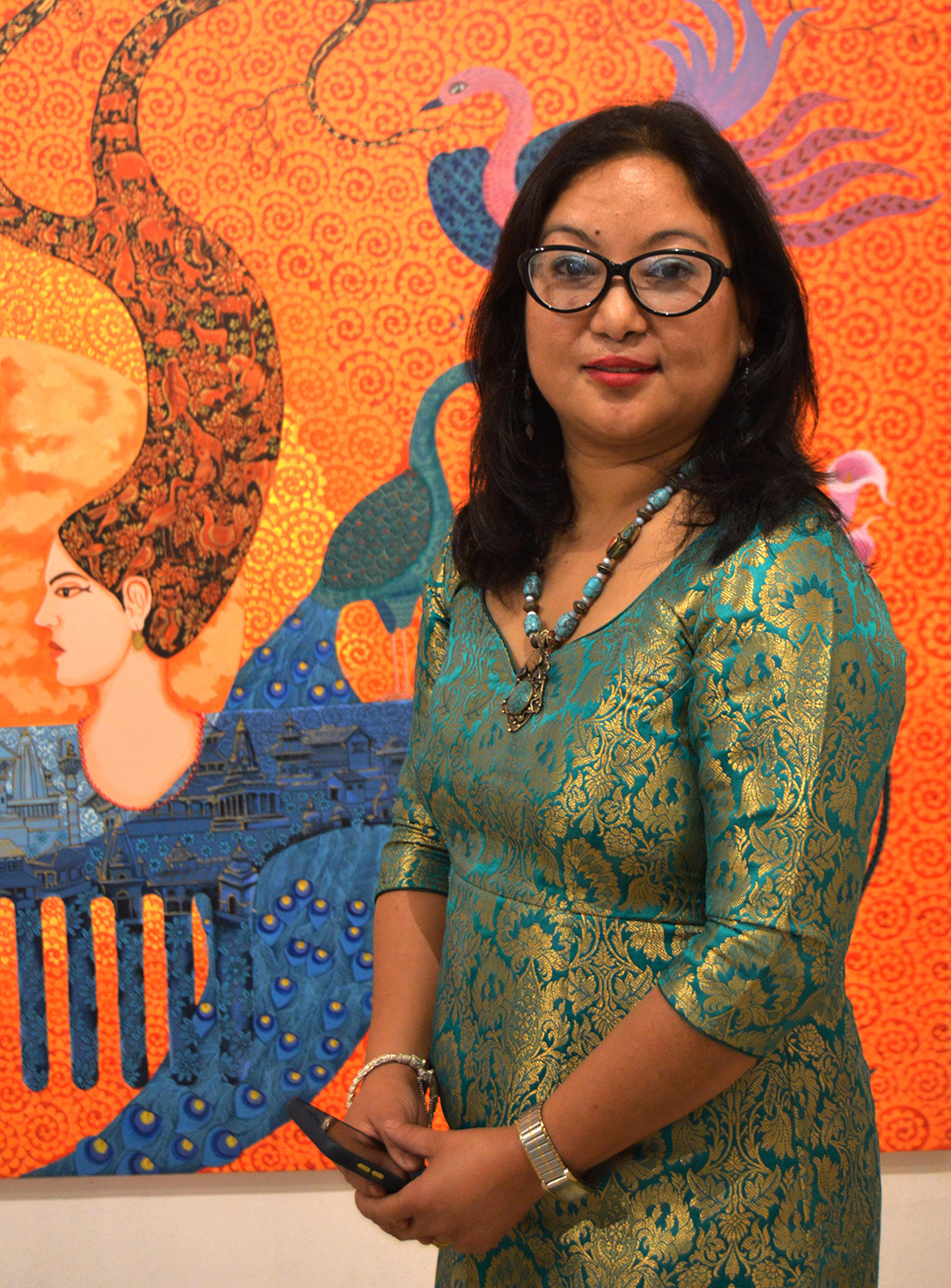
- Born: 26 August 1984 (age 41); Kathmandu, Nepal
- Education: MFA from Central Department of Fine Arts Tribhuvan University
- Style: Contemporary Art
- Awards: Araniko Youth Art Award from National Youth Service Fund, Best Nature Artist WWF RFWV, Special Prize from NAFA
- Website: https://sabitadangol.com/

Sabita Dangol (born 1984) is a Nepalese visual artist based in Kathmandu. Her artworks span painting, installation art, and performance art. She is the associated artist at the Taragoan Museum. She has participated in art events nationally and internationally since 2007.

== Biography ==
Dangol was born into a Newar family and grew up surrounded by various religious and cultural influences. Throughout her work, she reflects the Mithila and Paubha cultures of the Himalayan regions.

In 2011, she completed her BFA at Lalitkala Campus. During her studies, she realized she could become an artist after she participated in an art competition organized by the Fine Art College student association and won 2nd place. After this success, she developed a growing passion for art and began dreaming about becoming an accomplished artist one day.

In 2013, she earned her MFA from Tribhuvan University's Central Department of Fine Arts.

Dangol has been married to the artist Ishan Pariyar since 2016.

== Motifs and symbolism ==
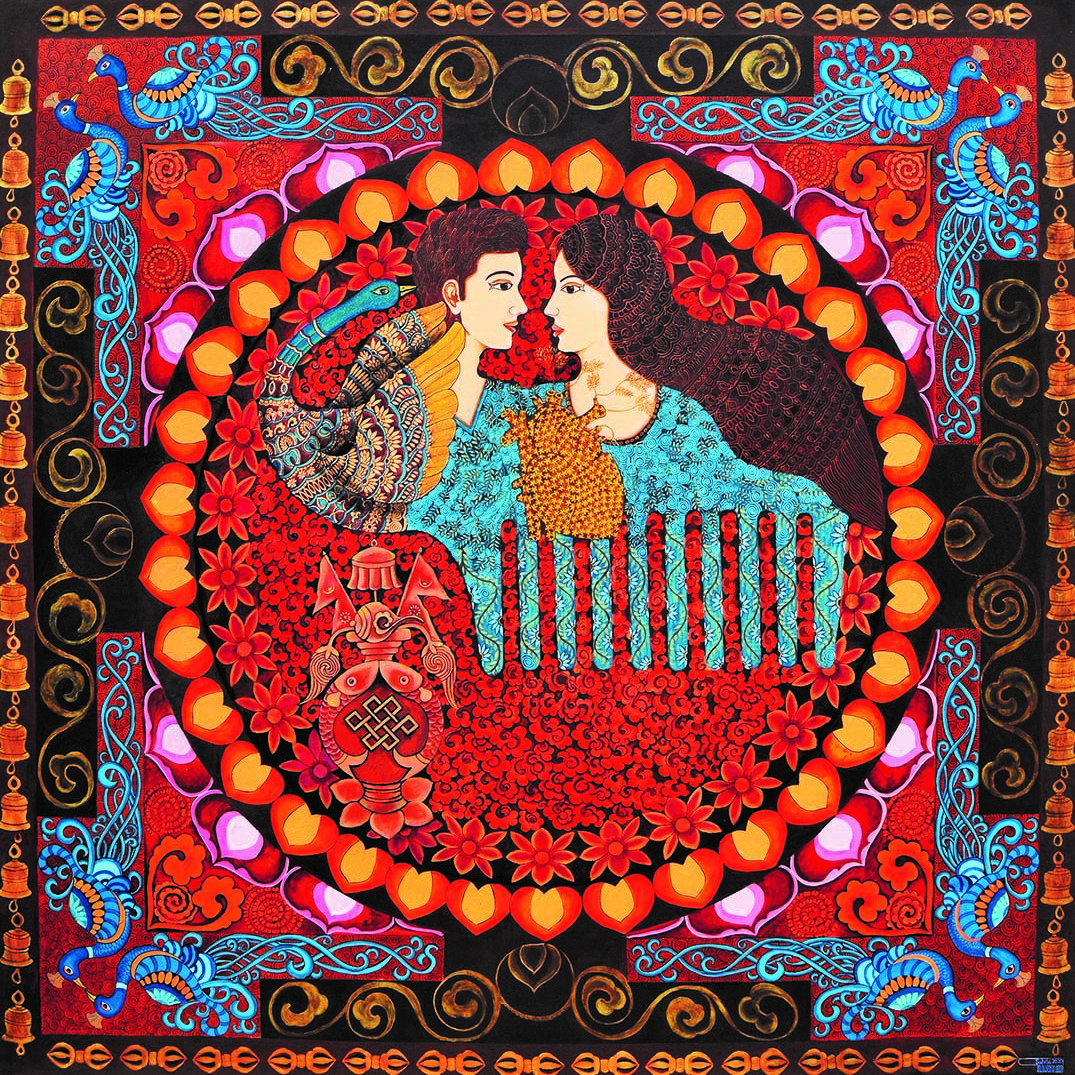
Inclination of Souls explores the importance of affection in life and explains its values in a compelling way. The painting represents the mandala and the symbolic representation of Nepali style designs and patterns. The center of the circular composition is occupied by a couple figure connected comb, peacock, heart and Asta Mangala kalash.

Dangol makes use of decorative patterns inspired by Mithila patterns, Nepali Paubha, and Zentangle art. Common motifs in her work include objects such as combs, old fashioned looking glasses, and human, bird, fish, and tree life. Her most frequent recurring theme is love between the couple of man and woman.

These figures inhabit the focal portion of her canvas. Her style has been compared to works by artists such as Marc Chagall and Gustav Klimt, who depicted couples as the central figures.

=== Comb ===
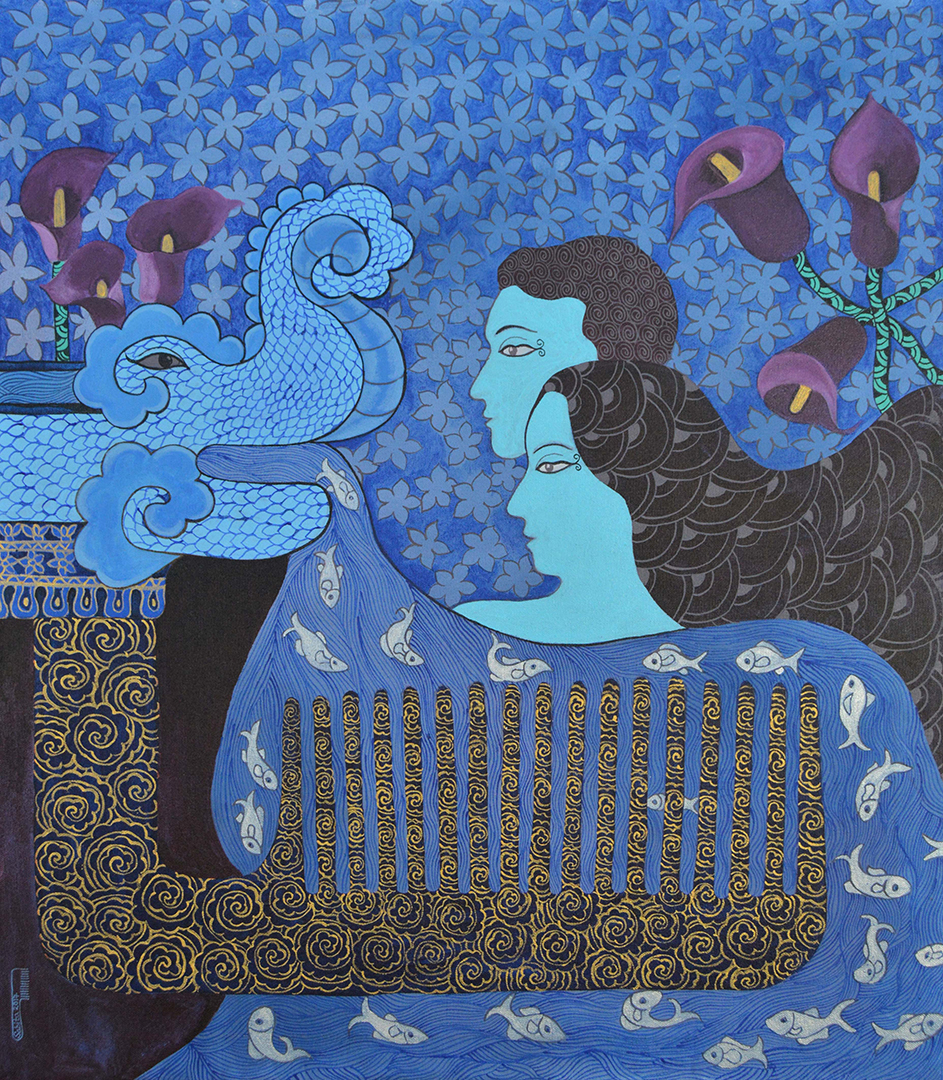
A 2017 painting by Dangol depicting a couple in a garden, interwoven with a body water

Dangol has incorporated the comb into her artworks since 2014. Her first comb was featured in a series of artworks exhibited at The Taragoan Museum in 2016. Dangol portrays combs as a positive and resolving tool to deal with daily life issues. According to her, it represents solutions and the power to untangle life's mess, which is interconnected with the soul. In her paintings, the comb acts as a reminder of the negative energies in viewers' lives, and that it is necessary and possible to shift through such energies to obtain enlightenment or bliss.

=== Couple ===
The symbol of the couple in Dangol's artwork symbolizes both her joy from her own marriage and a personal meditative reflection on life itself. As in the past, Dangol situates her couple in an idyllic landscapes or gardens replete with bodies of water, plants, and animals.

The artist also situates the couple in a vista of Newa architecture, drawing on indigenous motifs from the hills and plains of Nepal. In these works, culture and nature can co-exist in harmony. In the midst of details rendered in a technicolored palette, Dangol paints the eternal couple rapturously gazing at each other, as if their story of love transcends the past, present and future.

=== Plants ===
The white calla lily is seen blooming in her works, symbolizing life and fertility.

=== Asta Mangala and Shree Yantra ===
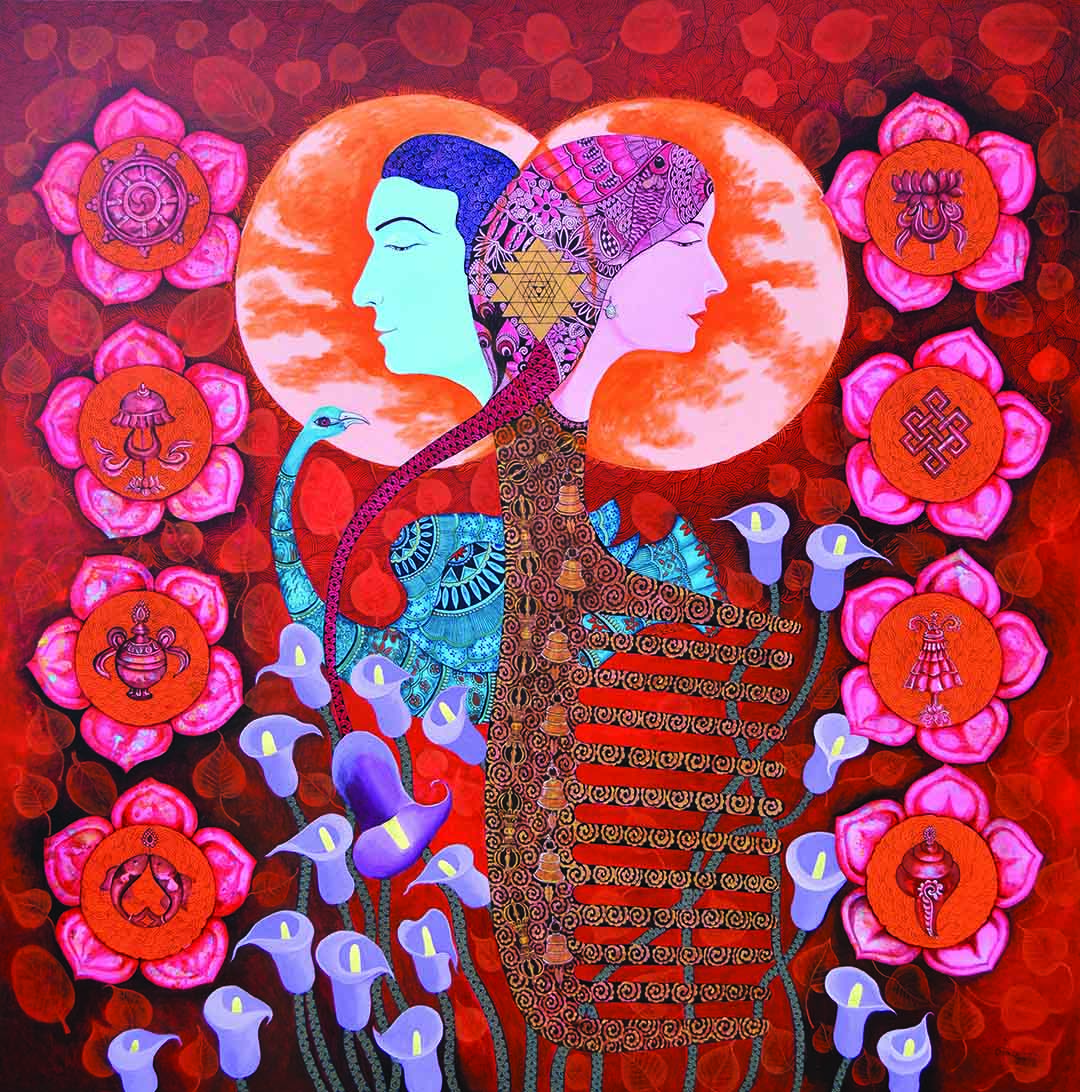
The central motif of the painting Symbiotic Life has been taken from the eight auspicious symbols of Buddhist ideology. Especially in the Newari culture in Kathmandu valley, generally known as Asta Mangala as a 8 symbol of the auspicious and prosperity.

The central motif of the painting Symbiotic Life draws from Asta Mangala, the eight auspicious symbol of Buddhist ideology. In the Newari culture in Kathmandu valley, Asta Mangala are symbols of prosperity, especially for newly married couples. The Astamangala or the eight auspicious signs which are religious symbols of Buddhists and Hindus.

The central male and female figures are complemented by the motif of Shree Yantra, which signifies the value of the unification and conjugal life. The background is painted with Banyan and Pipal leaf patterns, which are both sacred trees related to Bishnu and Laxmi, a Hindu couple god who are worshipped together. The calla lily signifies the beauty of couple, while a bird symbolizes freedom and free will.

== Exhibitions ==
Dangol has engaged in art activities in Nepal and abroad. She exhibited at the National Exhibition of Fine Arts from 2011-2020.

She showed her first solo exhibit, 'Insight of Foliate', at Nepal Art Council. Her next solo show '...of life that doesn't freeze' took place in 2012 at the Patan Museum & Solemn Odyssey in 2016 at Taragoan Museum.

In 2018, she presented 'Interconnected Affection' at GG Machhan. In 2018, she had a chance to exhibit in the India Art Fair in New Delhi representing artists from Nepal, the Nepal Art Council has been representing & showing work by Nepali Contemporary artists for several years. That same year, her artwork was selected for the '18th Asian Art Biennale' at Bangladesh Shilpakala Academy.

Another important participation includes 'A Tapestry of Voices' was organized by Himalayan Art Initiative and World Bank Nepal on the theme of gender based violence. It emphasizes gender aspects such as gender identity, violence and discrimination in Nepal.

She exhibited at the Himalayan Art Festival, put on by E Arts Nepal, in 2019, 2021, and 2022.

In 2023 she exhibited her 6th solo show, 'Inclination of Souls', at Siddhartha Art Gallery, Baber Mahal Revisited and has received good reviews.

In 2024 she was included in the exhibition Nepal : Contemporary Painting and Early Photographs in the Nalin's Collection was held at The Leonard Pearlstein Gallery of Drexel University, Philadelphia. The exhibition included 41 paintings by 13 contemporary Nepali artists on display alongside 42 early photographs from late 19th and early 20th century Nepal, and was hosted by Antoinette Westphal College of Media Arts & Design.

=== Other exhibitions ===
- 2012:
  - CRACK International Art Camp 6th edition
  - Park Art Fair (8th & 9th) at Park Gallery
- 2016 : Imago Mundi Nepal Collection
- 2018:
  - Art Meets Conservation, organized by the USAID-funded Program and the National Trust for Nature Conservation
  - India Art Fair, New Delhi
  - 18th Asian Art Biennale at Bangladesh Shilpakala Academy, Contemporary Art Exhibition
- 2019:
  - A Space For Freedom and Equality, American Embassy in Nepal
  - Art for Nature Relief fund for wildlife victims, WWF
- China - Asia Art exchange exhibition
- Nepali Magic, featuring art and impressions from Kathmandu and Himalayas in USA,
- 2022: 'Deities of Nepal' I & II at Nepal Art Council.
- 2022: Inclination of Souls at Siddhartha Art Gallery
- 2023: Tapestry of Voices' World Bank & Himalayan Art Initiative, Takpa Gallery
- 2024: NEPAL: Contemporary Paintings and Early Photographs in the Nalin collection, Leonard Pearlstein Gallery, Philadelphia USA
- 2025: Aura of Togetherness at Kathmandu Art Gallery, Babermahal Courtyard

== Awards ==
Dangol received an award from Camlin Ltd in Eastern Region Art Exhibition in 2010. She received the Special Prize from Nepal Academy of Fine Arts in 2017.

Dangol received the prestigious Araniko Youth Award from National Fund for Youth Service in 2019. That same year, she won Best Nature Artist' from WWF, RFWV (Relief fund for wildlife victim) & Art Club.

== Gallery ==
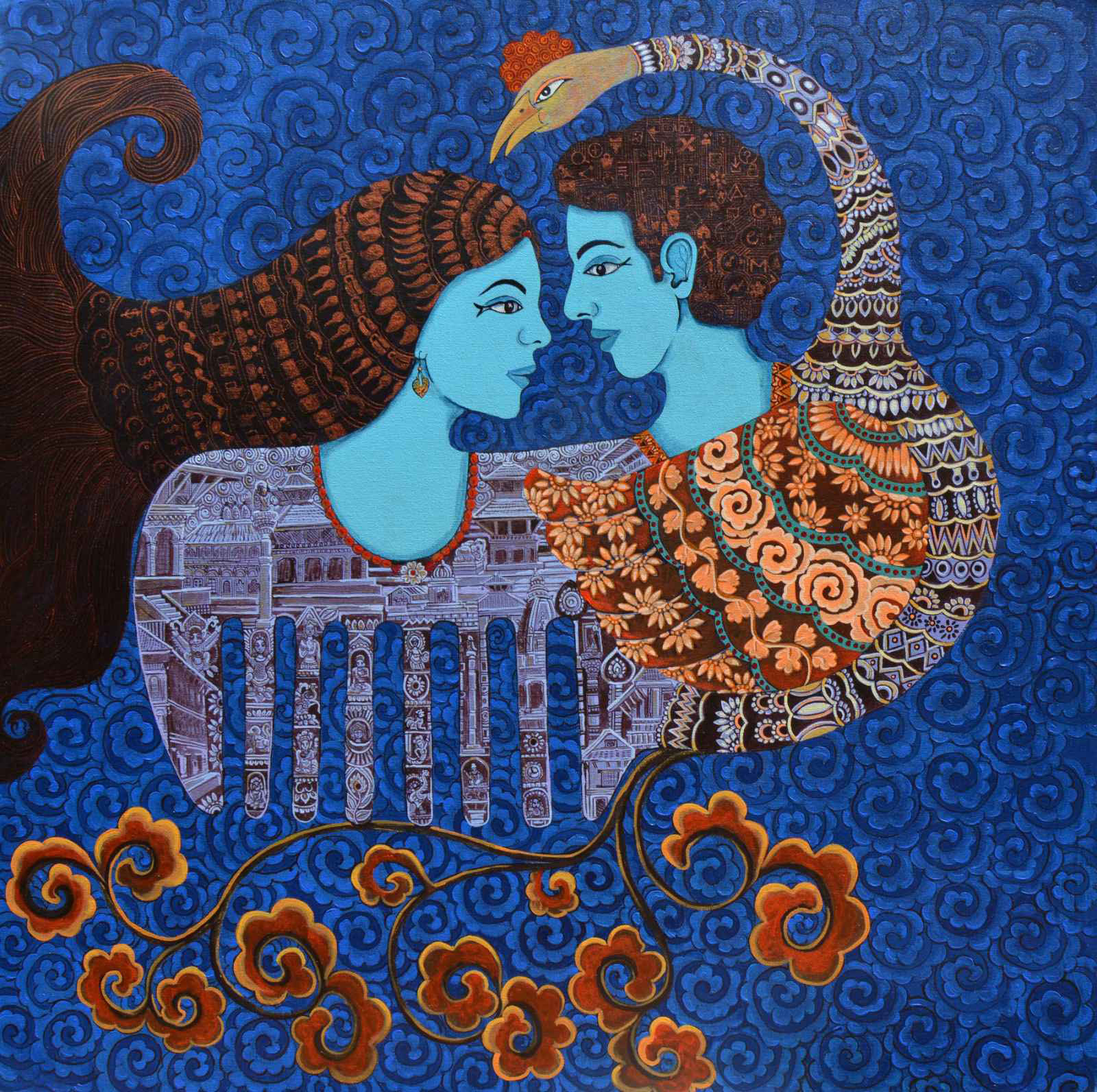
Protective Shelter 2020

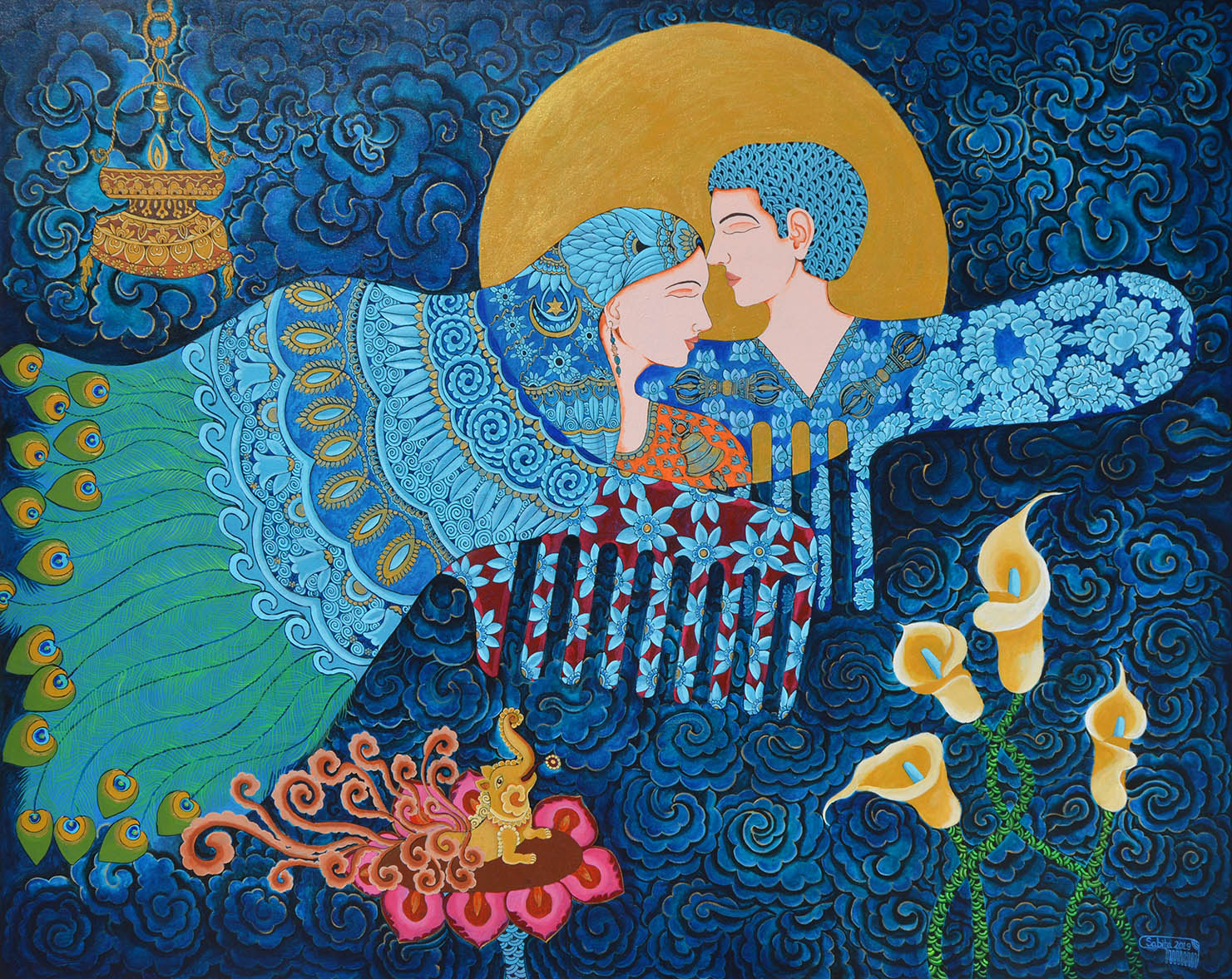
Eagerness of Time 2020

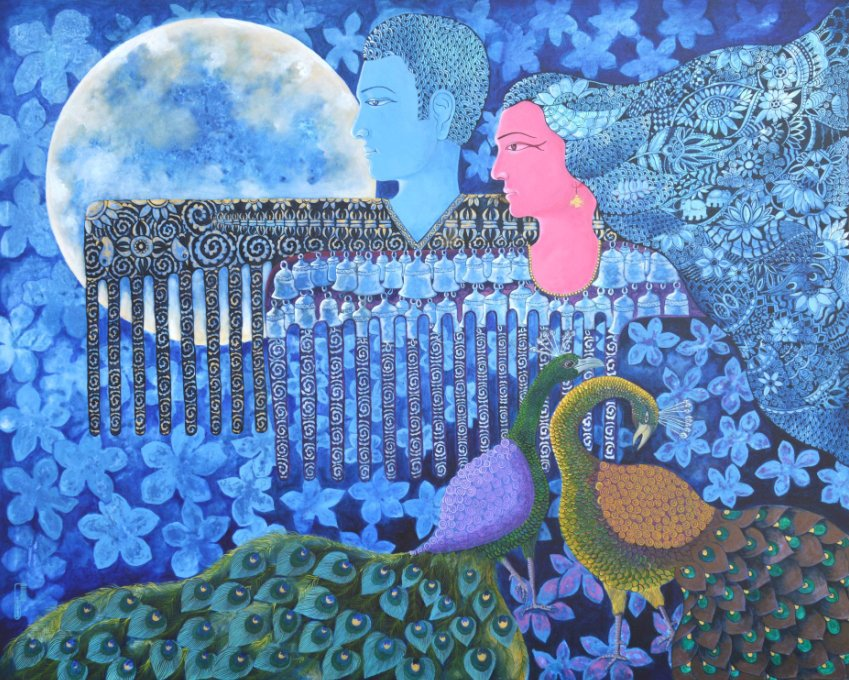
Sublime Conjugation 2017

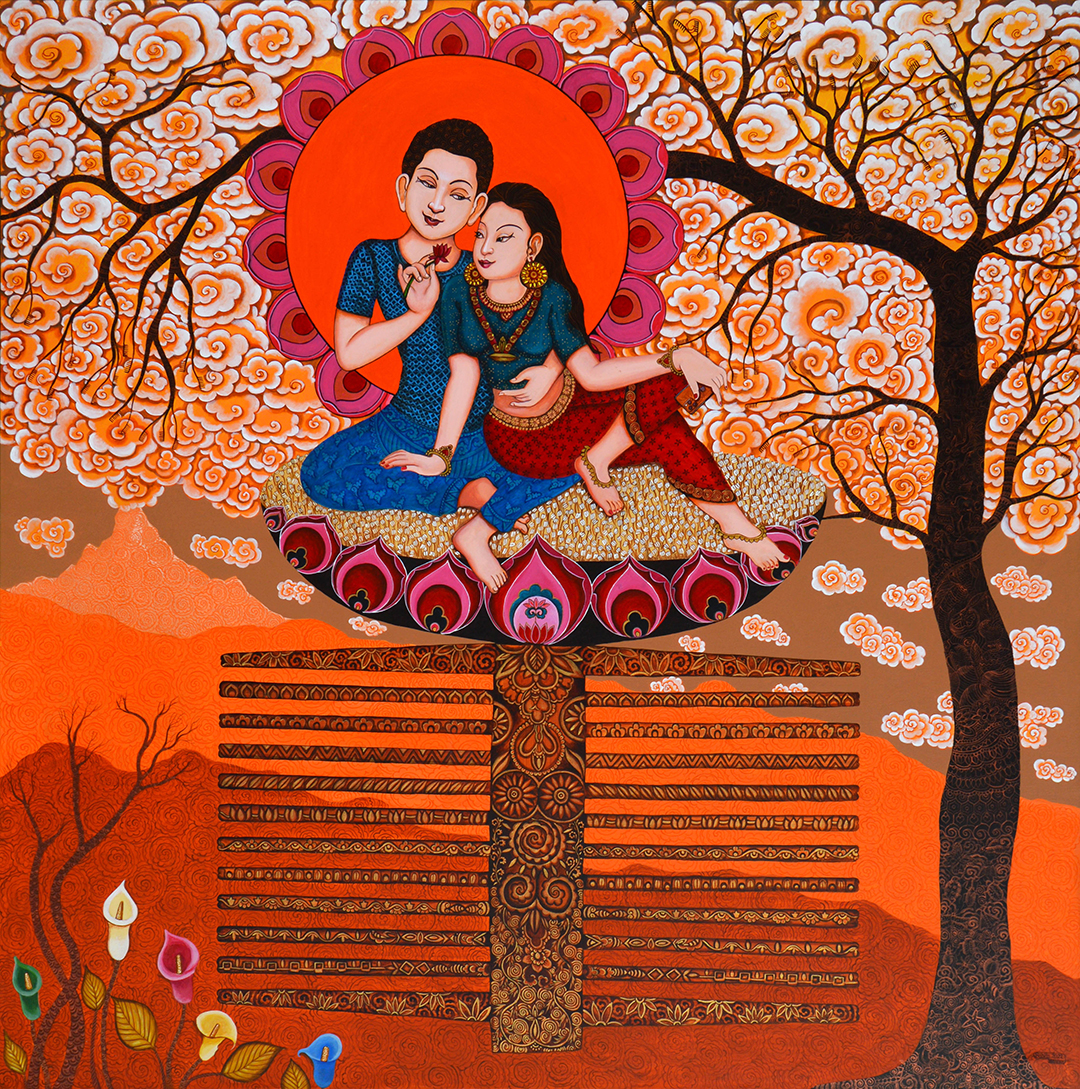
Uma Maheshwor 2022

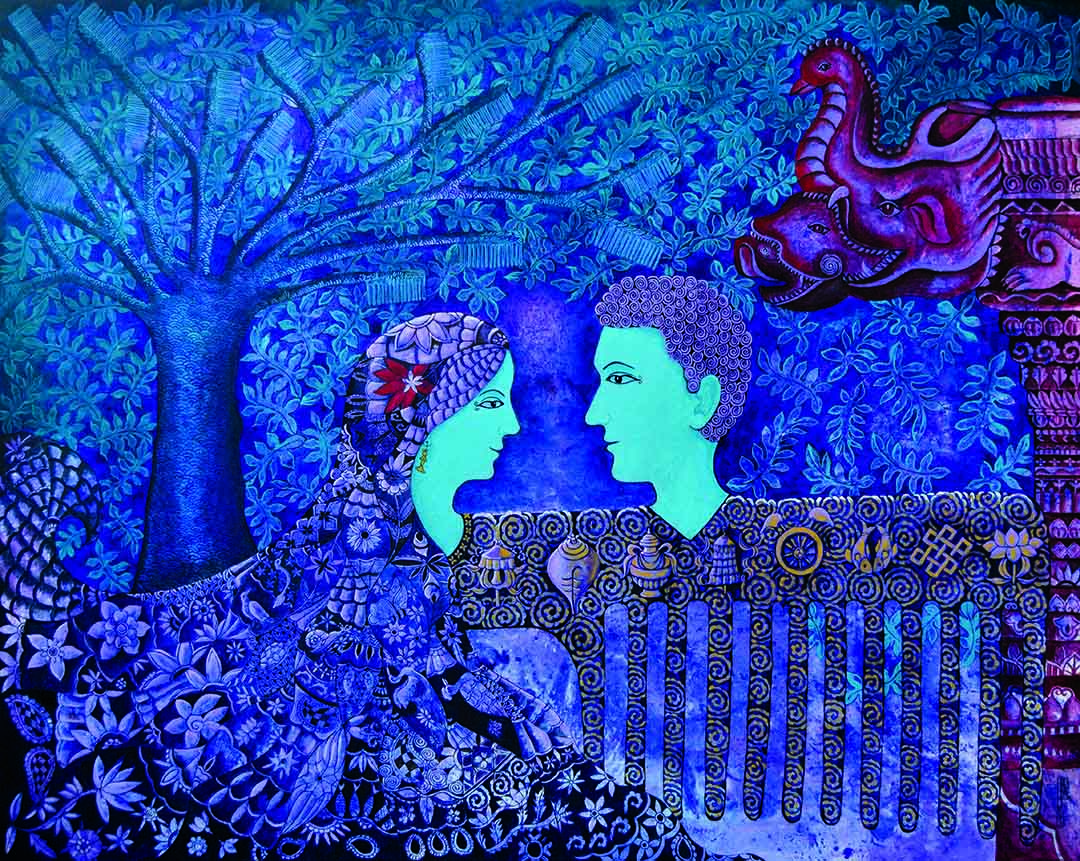
Couple 2018

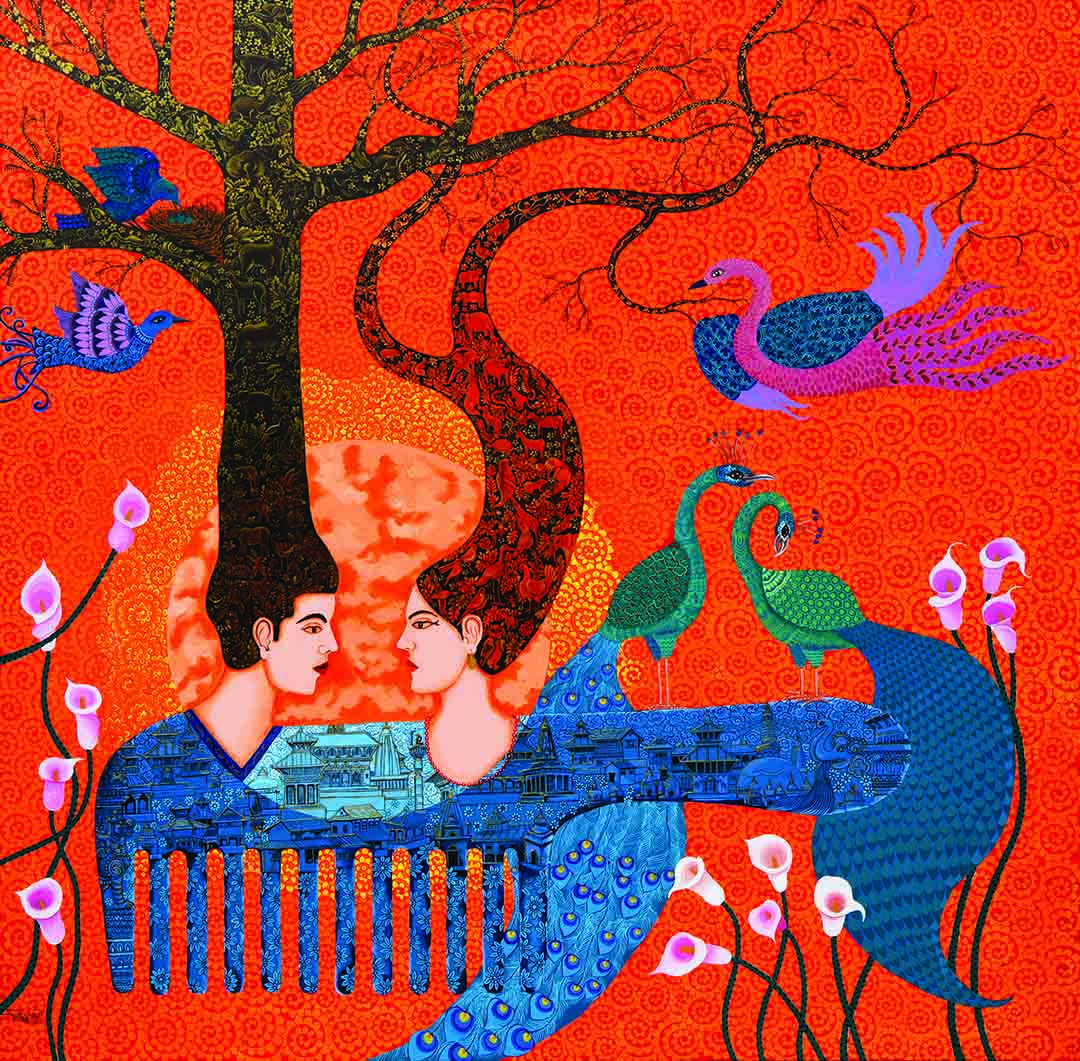
Tranquility of innovation and nature 2020
