= Raja Ravi Varma College of Fine Arts =

Art school in Mavelikkara, India

- Type: Public
- Established: 1915
- Affiliations: University of Kerala
- Location: Mavelikkara, Alappuzha district, Kerala, 690101, India; 9.2434°N 76.5395°E
- Campus: Urban
- Language: English
- Website: http://rrvcfa.in/

Raja Ravi Varma College of Fine Arts is a government college located in Mavelikkara, Alappuzha, Kerala, India. The college offers undergraduate degree course in fine arts, including in sculpture, painting and applied arts. It is affiliated with the University of Kerala and is under the administration of Directorate of Technical Education, Government of Kerala.

== History ==
The college was established by Rama Varma son of Raja Ravi Varma in 1915 as a training institute. It became a government institution after independence and was upgraded to Fine Arts College in the year 2000.

== Organization ==
The administration of the college is under the Department of Technical Education, Kerala and Department of Higher Education. Raja Ravi Varma college is affiliated with the University of Kerala.

== Admission ==
Admission to Bachelor Degree courses conducted in Raja Ravi Varma College of Fine Arts is made through an entrance examination conducted by the Directorate of Technical Education, Kerala. The basic qualification to apply is Plus Two or equivalent for Bachelor of Fine Arts courses. There is no upper age limit.

== Academic courses ==
Forty one students are taken in annually for training in painting, sculpture and applied arts, leading to a Bachelor of Fine Arts (BFA) degree. It is a four year course and the first year is common to all disciplines. The next three years are for specialization in painting, sculpture and Applied Arts.

Following are the list of courses offered

- Bachelor of Fine Arts in Painting
- Bachelor of Fine Arts in Sculpture
- Bachelor of Fine Arts in Applied Art

== Noted faculty and alumni ==
Following are the list of notable faculty and alumni of the college

- C. K. Ra
- K. Shankar Pillai
- Kattoor Narayana Pillai
- N.N. Rimzon
- P. K. Manthri
- Sosa Joseph
- T.A.S Menon
- T.R. Udayakumar
- Hariharan (director)

== Activities ==
In March 2023, the students and faculty along with two other fine arts colleges held an exhibition where two hundred art works in various styles, forms and media like paintings, sculpture, graphic art and photographs. It was named as Broadend, and was held at the College of Fine Arts gallery.

== See also ==
- Raja Ravi Varma
- College of Fine Arts Trivandrum
