= T.R. Udayakumar =

Indian contemporary artist

- Born: T.R. Udayakumar; 28 May 1965 (age 61); Kottayam, Kerala, India

T.R. Udayakumar (born 28 May 1965) is an Indian contemporary artist living in Kottayam, Kerala.

He was a former Executive Committee Member of Kerala Lalithakala Akademi and Co-ordinating Editor of 'Chithra Vartha Bulletin', Kerala Lalithakala Akademi Publication (November 2013-May 2016).

== Biography ==
Udayakumar born in Kotayam district and completed his studies in painting from Raja Ravi Varma College of Fine Arts.

== Solo exhibitions ==
- 'Continuing Ephemera', Lalithakala Akademi Art Gallery, Thiruvananthapuram, 2018,
- 'Untitled', Public Library Art Gallery, Kottayam, Kerala, 2016.
- 'Wounded Dreams', Durbar Hall Art Center, Ernakulam, Kerala, 2016.
- 'Hounting Insights', Lalithakala Lalithakala Akademi Art Gallery, Kottayam, Kerala,
- 'Dream Within A Dream', Lalithakala Akademi Art Gallery, Alappuzha, Kerala, 2015.
- 'Metaphors of Power', 2015 Durbar Hall Art Center, Ernakulam, Kerala, 2014.
- 'Metaphors of Power', Lalithakala Akademi Art Gallery, Kottayam, Kerala, 2013.
- 'Metaphors of Power', Museum Art Gallery, Thiruvananthapuram, Kerala, 2013.
- 'Lalithakala Akademi Art Gallery', Kottayam, Kerala, 2012.
- 'Lalithakala Akademi Art Gallery', Kottayam, Kerala, 2011.
- 'Exhibition of Drowing and Paintings', Press Club Art Gallery, Ernakulam, Kerala, 2011.
- 'Public Library Art Gallery, Kottayam', Kerala 2009.
