= Sosa Joseph =

Indian artist (born 1971)

- Born: 1971 (age 54–55); Parumala, Kerala, India
- Known for: Painting

Sosa Joseph (born 1971) is an Indian painter; she lives and works in London.

== Early life and education ==
Sosa was born in Parumala, an island village on River Pamba in Kerala, India, in 1971. She hails from a working-class family. Her father, K V Joseph, was a ferryman before he became a factory worker. She was raised in a house on the banks of the river, life around which was to become a leitmotif of her paintings later. In 2021, she wrote in an artist’s statement that the riverine ecosystem inspired her imagination, and greatly influenced her aesthetics, visual vocabulary, and her sense of colours and textures. She studied painting at the Raja Ravi Varma College of Fine Arts, Kerala, and the Maharaja Sayajirao University of Baroda, before having her first solo exhibition at Kashi Art Gallery in Kochi, in 2005.

== Career ==
Sosa’s works have been exhibited in Kochi-Muziris Biennale in 2012, the Stedelijk Museum Amsterdam in 2015, Centre Pompidou, Paris in 2017, Setouchi Triennale in Shōdoshima, Japan, in 2016, 21st Biennale of Sydney, in 2018, Clarinda Carnegie Art Museum, Iowa, USA in 2021, and Metropolitan Museum of Art, New York in 2022. Her recent solo exhibitions include Where do We Come From? at Galerie Mirchandani+Steinruecke, Mumbai, India in 2022, The Hushed History of Oblivion at Stevenson, Cape Town, South Africa in 2023, Pennungal: Lives of Women and Girls at David Zwirner, London, United Kingdom in 2024, and The Blue Blindfold and Other Stories at Stevenson, Amsterdam, the Netherlands in 2025. Her works are placed in several private and public collections worldwide, including the Kiran Nadar Museum of Art, New Delhi, and the Metropolitan Museum of Art, New York.

== Projects and exhibitions ==
The Blue Blindfold and Other Stories (2025): Exhibited at Stevenson, Amsterdam in May 2025. The exhibition comprised seven paintings including Appams for the in-laws (2025), Dress-up on a chaotic afternoon (2025), and The Blue Blindfold (2025), the work central to this series.

In describing her process Joseph writes: ‘I paint from memory – from moments I lived, from observations that lie dormant until the brush wakes them up again. I don’t plan stories when I paint. They just show up. Sometimes it’s the strange theatre of everyday life – the mess, the beauty, the sadness, the small private worlds we live in. A story can come from an overheard conversation, a windowless room, a chaotic moment – a kitchen in a rush, a half-sung profanity song, etc, etc. Colours come by themselves, carrying the feeling of the moment.’

Pennungal: Lives of Women and Girls (2023–2024): Pennungal is the vernacular for 'women' in Malayalam, Sosa’s mother tongue. Painted between 2023 and 2024, this body of works consists of 14 oil paintings on canvas. David Zwirner gallery called the works ‘among the most directly autobiographical’ and described the project in a press release saying, ‘the paintings in this exhibition reflect on Joseph’s experiences and observations of the treatment of women and girls from her hometown of Parumala, an island village situated on the Pamba River’, adding, ‘the artist looks back at her formative early years, examining the societal and structural limitations that have long been imposed upon the women’, and that ‘her work offers an alternative approach to the artistic tradition of history painting—one in which everyday moments take on the heft of the extraordinary and… coalesce into a richly tapestried communal history.’ In a 2024 interview—published by David Zwirner—that covers in detail the moral strictures and patriarchal concepts of women’s purity and ‘pizhakkal’ [Malayalam for ‘going astray’ or ‘unchaste’] that governed the ‘bizarre moral universe’, of Keralan society during her childhood and adolescence, Sosa herself said the paintings in this series were ‘improvisations from memory of moments, experiences, people, places and so on. But they all relate to the lived experiences of women and girls as I knew them while growing up.’ The project included noted works such as Girls learning to find eggs inside hens (2023-24), Śarada, (2023–2024), Girl in the red blouse (2024), Snakeheads, catfish, and Aisha (2024), and The cradle (2023–2024).

The Hushed History of Oblivion (2022-2023): ‘A global visual narrative of slave life, from Southeast Asia to the Cape Colony and Central America…the Hushed History of Oblivion is an attempt to reimagine, and to redeem from history, the lives of people who were subjected to the Indian Ocean slave trade’. The paintings were exhibited in Stevenson gallery, Cape Town in May 2023; Stevenson noted, ‘rendered in Joseph’s characteristic style of expressionist figuration…the scenes in The Hushed History of Oblivion act as an alternative visual record of the experiences of enslaved people…the series both uncovers and archives these histories, bringing together moments of daily life from the most brutal to the incidental. In the large-scale triptych which shares its title with the exhibition, the figures are seen amid violence, resistance, toil, and domesticity, offering a cosmology of narratives.’ The series comprised 14 paintings including Abduction of Anima, Kuttanad, Kerala (2022) April van Cochin and others detained in a defunct church, Cochin (2022–2023), Unnamed Asian slave smoking his master’s pipe, Cape Town, saying ‘I work the whole time, I must also rest a little’ (2023), besides the largescale triptych, The Hushed History of Oblivion (2022–2023).

In an essay that summarised her inspiration, motives, and research for the project—published by Stevenson, Cape Town, in 2023 as a booklet—the artist said the works were her homage to the victims of the Indian Ocean slave trade. Of the people who were sold into slavery from Kerala and the Indian littoral, she wrote: ‘Cultivating wheat, barley, rye and grapes in the Cape Colony, working as porters at the port and as nurses and grave diggers at the VOC hospital in Cape Town, working cargo in the port of Manila, toiling in sugar and cocoa haciendas and the notorious obrajes, [and] peddling sugar and other produce through the streets of Acapulco and Mexico City, they walked into oblivion, with not even their countrymen remembering them, even collectively. They weren’t given the kindness of a historically accurate remembrance… they lost all traces of their identity, and became a forgotten and lost people, as history remained silent on them for centuries. This body of work is for them, portraying a few of those long-forgotten people as I imagine them in moments from their lives as slaves, and presented here with the regret that I could cover only very few of them.’

Where do We Come From? (2019-2021) Exhibited at Galerie Mirchandani + Steinruecke, Mumbai, in 2022, ‘Where do We Come From?’ marks Sosa’s first solo exhibition to focus on River Pamba. The 15 paintings in this body of works trace the origins of her life back to the river, and places emphasis on the landscape, with its creepers and critters, as a point of origin of her painterly sensibility. Artforum further noted that ‘the paintings pay tribute and carry an atmosphere that is unspoiled and vibrant—though the natural world remains dynamic, even chaotic. Her characters play out small dramas high and low. Joseph dips us into a brilliant but impermanent world.’ The series included noted works such as The Ferryman and his Jaundiced Child (2019) Duck Farmers (2019–2021), Frog Hunters (2021), and Luffa Gatherers (2021).

== Style, process and themes ==
Sosa Joseph’s paintings are noted for their painterliness with their loose brushwork, sweeping scale, dreamlike quality, masterful use of colour with a distinctive palette, and narrative content.

Sosa is known to paint ‘largely from memory, sifting through her lived emotions and experiences’. She does not ‘plot out paintings or fill them with preparatory drawings’ but prefers to approach the painting process with an ‘improvisatory and deeply intuitive spirit’, ‘pursuing incidental leads as they come’, amounting to a technique that has been called a ‘kind of automatic painting, with a built-in system of editing', with the result that ‘figures, places, and palettes of evocative colour begin to materialise of their own accord.’ In a 2024 interview with Shadowplay magazine, asked to define her artistic research in three words, the artist said: ‘Intuitive, spontaneous, improvisation’. This ‘improvisational process’, it has been noted, 'gives her works their ‘still-alive quality’ that makes them ‘fluctuate like memory itself’. This aspect of the artist’s process, among other factors, could be contributing to the repeatedly noted ‘atmospheric’, ‘dreamlike’, ‘ephemeral’, ‘fluid/liquid’, 'psychically charged’, quality of her canvases, which have also been called ‘surreal dreamscapes’ with ‘striking visual and psychological complexity’ while being ‘as delicate as flowing water.’

Considered a ‘masterful colourist and storyteller’, Sosa’s paintings are frequently noted for their narrative complexity. Many of her works have been observed to be ‘compositions evoking the rich, layered narratives’ with ‘meandering narrative intricacies’, wherein ‘stories unfold in a cornucopia of forms’, offering a ‘cosmology of narratives’. This polyphony of narrative figuration, ‘constructed from overlapping vignettes’, often with their characteristic ‘whirl of mosaic motifs’ is frequently deployed in service of several themes that the artist engages with from time to time: capturing the ‘mayhem of ordinary life’ along River Pamba where the artist grew up (as seen in the 2022 body of works called ‘Where do We Come From?’), examining the meaning of women’s lives and portraying the feminine condition in patriarchal societies (in works such as What Are We? series from 2012, or the works in ‘Pennungal: Lives of Women and Girls’, 2024), creating an ‘alternative visual record of the experiences of enslaved people’ victimised by the Indian Ocean slave trade (in ‘The Hushed History of Oblivion’, 2023) or exploring the absurd tragicomedy of Keralan socio-political life in several paintings dubbed the ‘Mattancherry works’. Peopled with a large number of figures, Sosa’s works have been characterised as tableaux marked by a ‘state of half-thereness’ that ‘vibrates with the comings and goings of’ a large number of characters inhabiting a world where ‘solitude is in short supply.’

River Pamba is also noted to be a ‘perennial character’ in several of Sosa Joseph’s works, playing a ‘silent yet omnipresent role’, at times appearing ‘glassy, animated by shades of aquamarine and teal’, and otherwise ‘dark and foreboding’.
