= Suresh K. Nair =

Indian artist

Suresh Kumar Nair
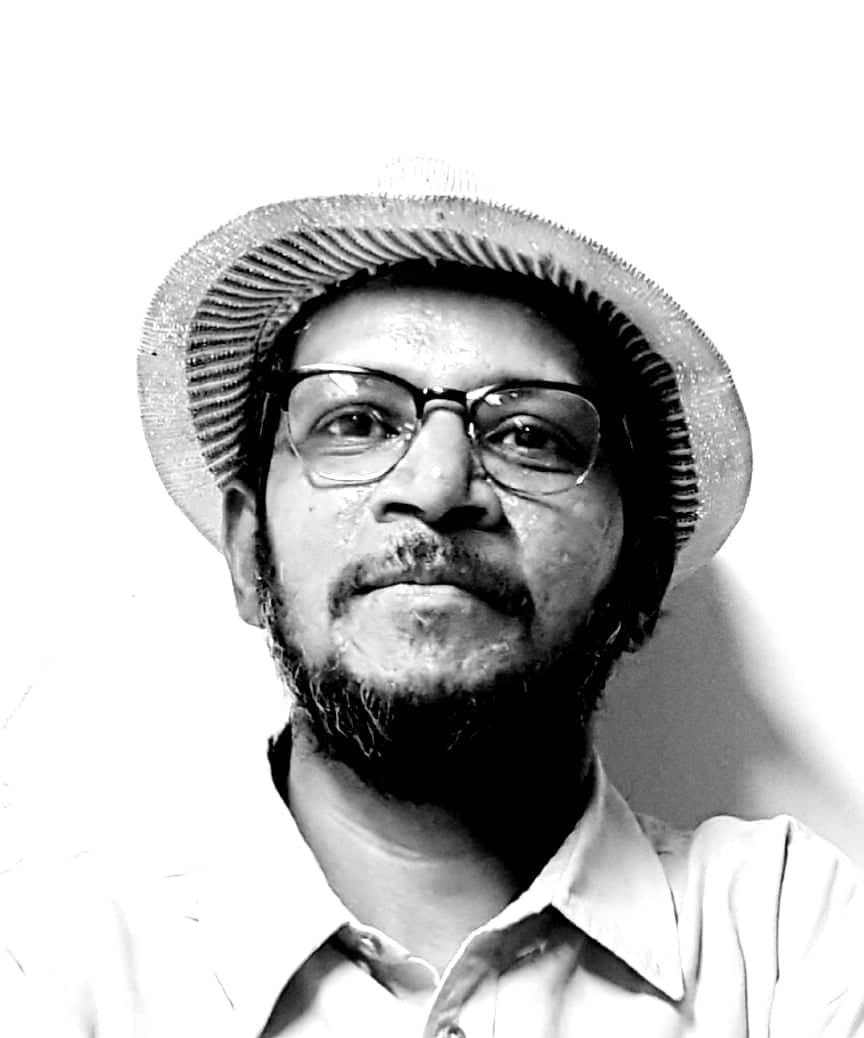
- Born: 30 January 1971 (age 55); Adakkaputhur, Kerala, India

Suresh K. Nair (born 1971 in Adakkaputhur, Kerala, India) is an artist based in Banaras. Nair obtained his national diploma in mural painting from the Institute of Mural Painting Guruvayur, Kerala under the guidance of Mammiyur Krishnan Kuty Nair. He was inspired by the works of Rabindranath Tagore, Nandalal Bose, Benode Behari Mukherjee and Ramkinker Baij and continued his studies at the Department of Painting, Visva Bharati University, Santiniketan. Nair has acquired a presence in the Indian and international art scene over the last decade with several shows organized by regional and international galleries and museums, and created many murals in India and abroad. His early works are based on Kerala murals, both in terms of technique and ideas. One of his modern paintings, ‘Cosmic Butterfly" is owned by Essl Museum, Vienna, Austria since 2010. His works were exhibited in the US, Spain, and Canada, and his awards include the Elizabath Green Shield Foundation Scholarship (1999) of Canada; Fulbright Fellowship ( 2006–07) for an Educational Exchange Program at Tyler School of Art, Temple University, Philadelphia under Professor Nicholas Kripal; and the State Award of Kerala Lalithkala Akademi, Ministry of Culture, Government of Kerala.

Since 2007, he teaches art at the Department of Painting, Faculty of Visual Arts, Banaras Hindu University, Varanasi, India. In the last decade, among his other projects, he is making experimental drawings inspired by music.

== Early life and education ==
He was brought up in the culturally diverse Valluvanadu region in Vellinezhi, Palakkad District in Kerala, South India, and observed the living traditions of performing arts like Kathakali, Bharatanatyam, Mohiniyatam, Theyyam and Thira. He was fascinated by the temple murals of the region, book illustrations, contemporary paintings and photographs. He acquired his basic art education at the Silpa Chithra College of Art, Pattambi. From a young age, he was making sketches of moving figures, especially kathakali dancers. On one of these occasions. he met the French artist, Brigith Revelli, who commissioned him to draw postures and hand gestures of Katakhali dancers and exhibited his drawings and paintings at the French Cultural Center of Trivandrum, New Delhi and Paris.

== Career ==
He studied Kerala mural painting for five years at Guruvayur Temple under the famous mural maestro, Mammiyoor Krishnan Kutty Nair, and continued his education at Visva Bharati University, Santiniketan, West Bengal. Bengali artists like Rabindranath Tagore, Nandalal Bose, Benode Behari Mukherjee, Ramkinkar Baij and the filmmaker Satyajit Ray, had a great impact on his art practice, and he started learning contemporary performing arts as well. After completing his studies, he worked as a lecturer at Sri Sankaracharya Sanskrit University in Kalady, and he spent six months at Tyler School of Art, Temple University, Philadelphia after he received a Fulbright Fellowship in 2005. In 2007, he joined Banaras Hindu University as a faculty member. Since then he is an assistant professor of painting at the Department of Painting, Faculty of Visual Arts.

== Wall of Peace ==
The Wall of Peace is a public art project initiated by Suresh K. Nair, and executed with the help of his students of Benares Hindu University in January 2019 in Cherpulassery, Kerala. The images created on the boundary wall of the Government Vocational Higher Secondary School are related to local history and tradition in order to promote peace and harmony. The project was completed with the support of Dr. Shehen P. V., Hamsa P. V., the SPACE Project (School Project Aiming at Excellence) and the local people of Cherpulassery. The 7,000-sq-ft wall is divided into 25 panels depicting local history, culture and tradition, and it is framed as a story-telling scroll starting with a Moon and finishing with a Sun made of mirrors. There are portraits of Mozhikunnath Brahmadattan Namboodiripad, an eminent figure of the 1921 Malabar rebellion; Netaji Subhash Chandra Bose, a political leader fighting for independent India; Gandhi talking to the people of Cherpulassery; P. T. Bhaskara Panicker, a great scientist and educator of Kerala; Kannattil Ramanezhuthachan, the well-loved clerk of the school, who planted the banyan trees, and many others. Images of local tradition include a figure of traditional shadow puppetry, the Tholppava Koothu; temple dancers during Teyyam and Thira.

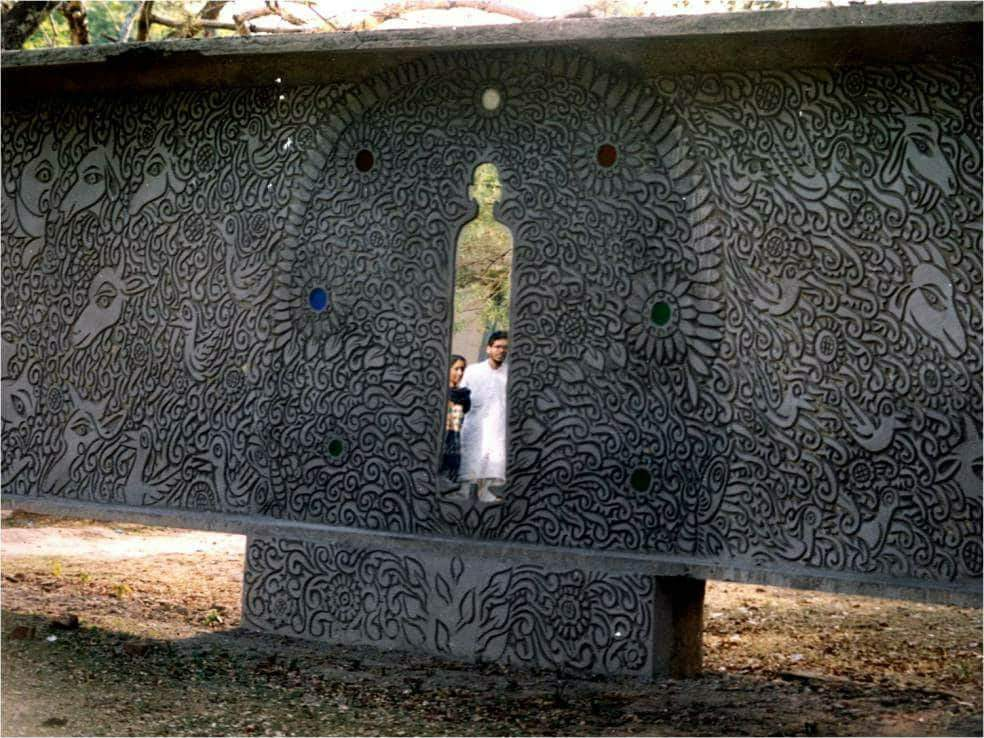
The Saint

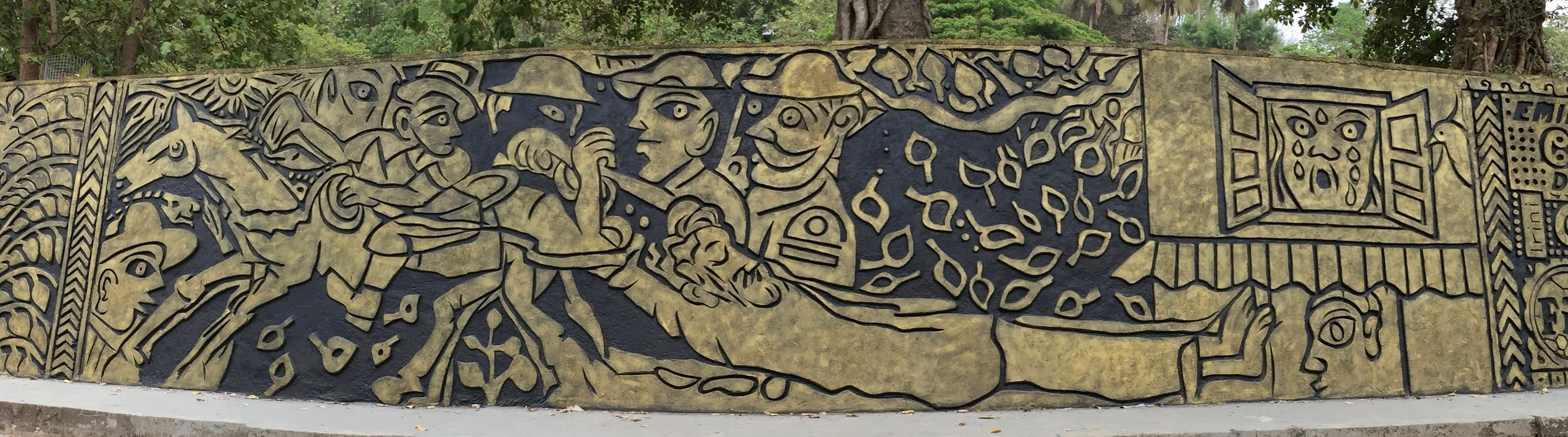
Wall of Peace

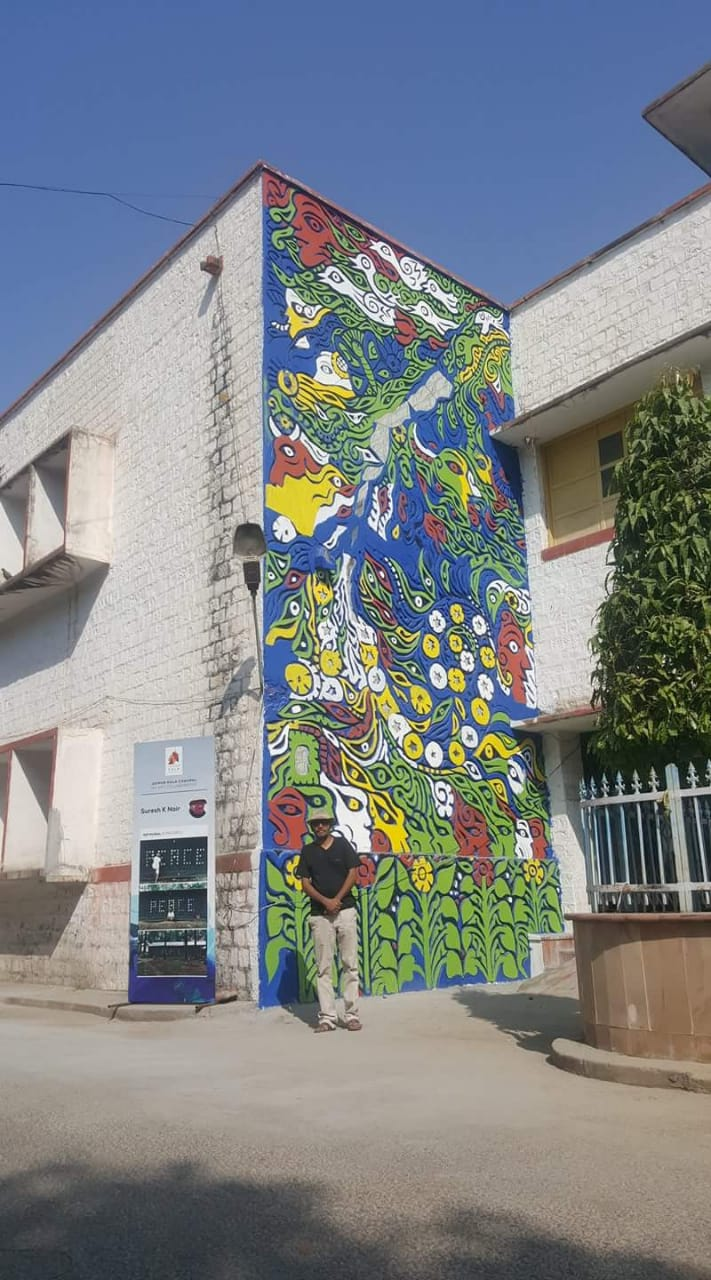
Water

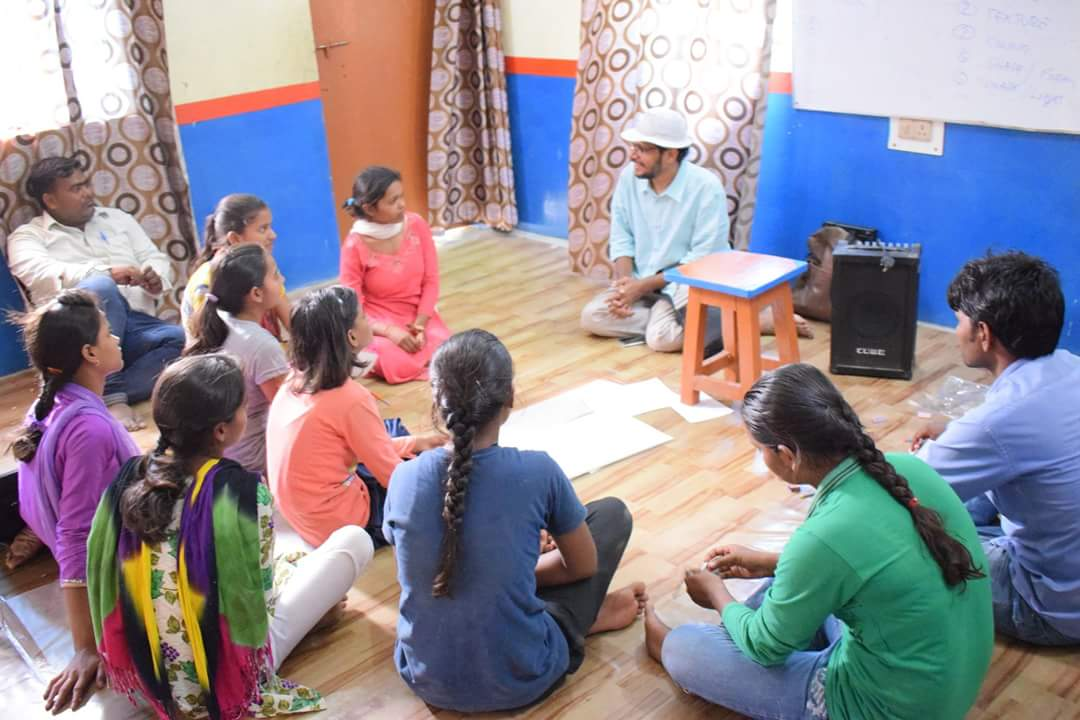
Art Class for Children

== Website ==
www.wallofpeace.in
