= Harikrishnan G. =

Indian art photographer

Harikrishnan G
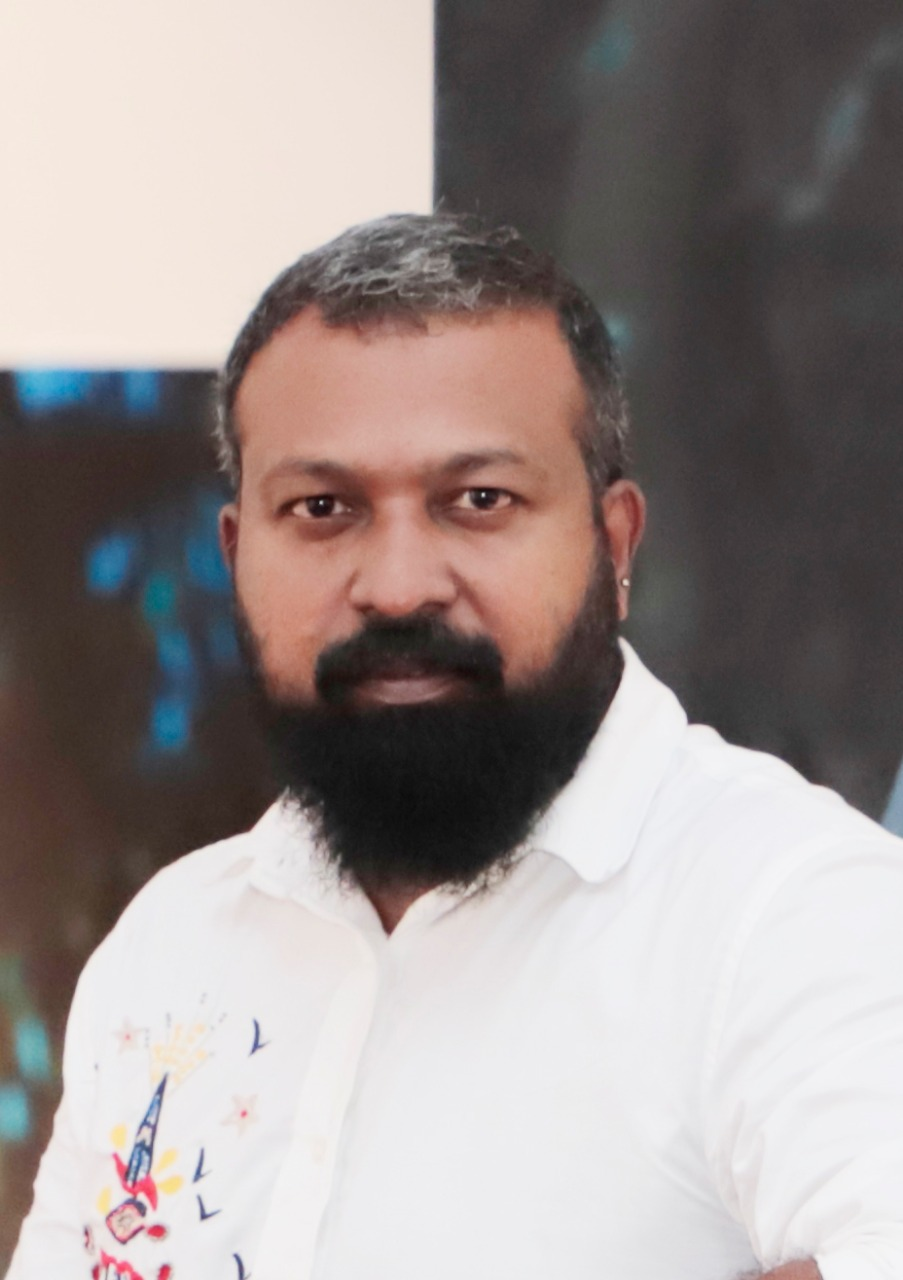
- Born: Thiruvalla, Pathanamthitta, Kerala, India
- Occupations: Photographer, fine-art photography, painter
- Years active: 2008–present
- Parents: Late. K Gopinadhan Achari (father); Late. MV Mani (mother)
- Awards: Kerala Lalithakala Akademi fellowship ( 2019 )

Harikrishnan G. is an Indian art photographer, who is working as a photo journalist in Malayala Manorama, a Malayalam publication.

== Career ==
Harikrishnan G started his career as a professional photographer during his graduation studies. In 2008, after completing his graduation in applied arts, he joined as a photojournalist in Vanitha, India's leading women's magazine in Malayalam language. He is blending his art skills with photography and doing fine-art photography exhibitions on the platform of Kerala Lalithakala Akademi.

In his exhibitions, he carefully exhibits his art as a torch to the society.

Harikrishnan's first solo exhibition was in 2015 October "Emotional Hardcore" portrayed dark skinned subjects in a way challenging the notion of fairness and beauty.

His second exhibition was in May 2016, "The Trans" series was a manifestation of transgender identity through creative frames. It portrayed three people in a special mood to emphasize the anguish of third genders.

In March 2018, Harikrishnan performed his third exhibition "Alien", that portrayed Women in Solitude, which addressed woman and her safety in various realms of their life.

His fourth exhibition "Secret Garden" a lone walk through the garden of soul' is one of his latest works containing a collection of magical, spellbound photography that resembles abstract paintings.

== Awards ==
His contribution in the field of art with his camera has bagged Kerala Lalithakala Akademi fellowship in 2019.
