= Shawon Akand =

Bangladeshi artist, researcher and writer

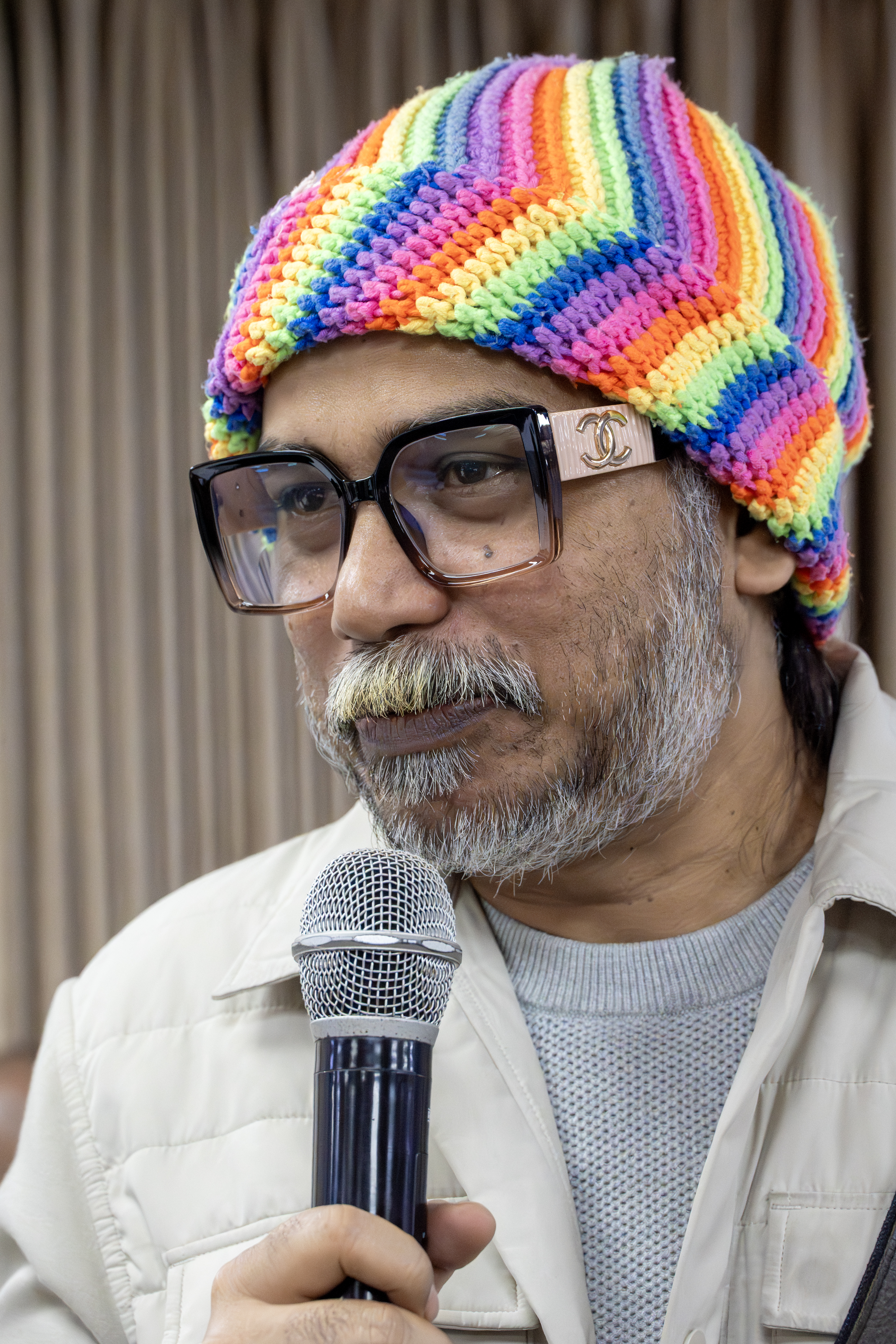
- Shawon Akand in 2026
- Born: October 15, 1975 (age 51); Kushtia, Bangladesh
- Education: University of Dhaka
- Occupations: artist; writer; researcher
- Years active: 2016–present
- Notable work: Bangladesher Tantshilpa (2018)
- Mother: Shahida Musa Ashru
- Awards: 2019 Prothom Alo Book of the Year Award

Shawon Akand (born 15 October 1975) is a Bangladeshi painter, writer, researcher, and curator. He is known for his research on folk art and textile arts of Bangladesh. His research book on handloom crafts, Handloom Industry of Bangladesh (2018), received the Prothom Alo Book of the Year Award 1424 in the non-fiction category. Since 2012, he has been contributing to the Art Asia Pacific Almanac. He is also known as a lyricist of several songs from the Atol Joler Gaan (2013) album by the band Joler Gaan. Currently, he is the director and co-founder of Jathashilpa, a center for traditional and contemporary arts.

== Early life ==
Shawon was born on 15 October 1975 in Kushtia, Bangladesh. His mother, Shahida Musa Ashru (1933–2015), was known as a poet and social activist. He completed his secondary education from Kushtia Zilla School and higher secondary education from Kushtia Government College. He trained in Graphic Design from the Institute of Fine Arts at the University of Dhaka in 1997.

In 2007, he co-founded the CRACK International Art Camp, an annual event inspired by Baul philosophy. In 2016, he established the non-profit research and resource center “Ashru Archive” in Kushtia. In the same year, he co-founded Jathashilpa, a center for traditional and contemporary arts.

== Research work ==
Shawon has conducted extensive research on the handloom industry of Bangladesh. He has also carried out research on rickshaw art. In 2023, he received the Ganesh Haloi Bengal Research Fellowship for his research titled “Alternative History of Dhaka Art: In Search of Non-Institutional Genres.”

He has also received research fellowships/grants from the Asia-Europe Foundation, the Bangladesh Film Archive, the Palli Karma-Sahayak Foundation, and Deshal.

== Notable exhibitions ==
=== Solo exhibitions ===
Year	Exhibition	Venue	Notes
2007	What is Reality	Drik Gallery, Dhaka	
2013	Paradox of the Partition	NIV Art Centre, New Delhi	
2016	To See or Not to See	National Art Gallery, Dhaka	

== Publications ==
Shawon's major publications include:

- An Outline of Bangladesh Folk Art
- Textile Traditions of Bangladesh
- Cinema Banner Painting in Bangladesh
- The Tendency of Modern Art in Bangladesh

== Awards ==
- 2019 – Prothom Alo Book of the Year Award 1424
