= Hare Rama Hare Krishna =

Hare Rama Hare Krishna may refer to:

- Hare Krishna (mantra), consisting of the words Hare Rama and Hare Krishna, a Vaishnava (Hindu) mantra/chant praising the god Krishna
- International Society for Krishna Consciousness, a Hindu (Krishnaist) religious organization, members of which chant the mantra
- Hare Rama Hare Krishna (1971 film), an Indian Hindi-language film directed by and starring Dev Anand
  - "Hare Rama Hare Krishna", title song of the 1971 film by R. D. Burman, Asha Bhosle and Usha Iyer
- Hare Rama Hare Krishna (2011 film), an Indian Kannada-language film directed by C. V. Ashok Kumar
- Hare Rama Hare Krishna, the working title of Jalsa, a 2008 Indian Telugu-language film directed by Trivikram Srinivas
- Hare Rama Hare Krishna, another title for Varudu, a 2010 Indian Telugu-language film

== See also ==
- Hare Krishna (disambiguation)
- Hare Ram, a 2008 Indian Telugu-language action thriller film
- "Bhool Bhulaiyaa", or "Hare Ram Hare Ram", the title track of the 2007 Indian comedy horror film Bhool Bhulaiyaa
