= Sathyapal T. A =

Indian painter

Sathyapal T. A സത്യപാൽ ടി.എ
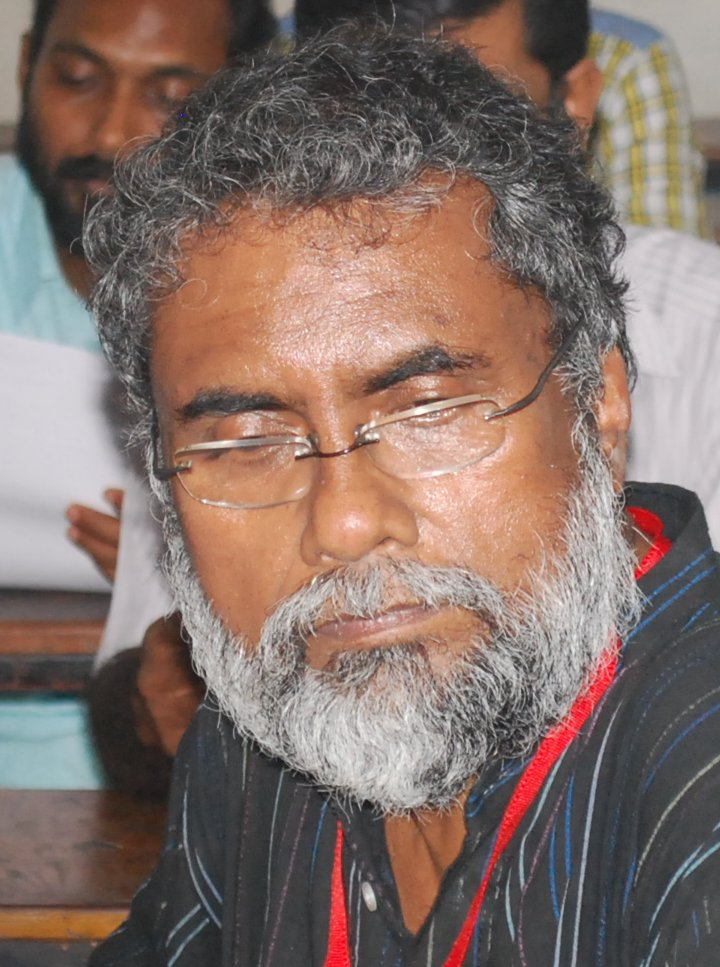
- Born: Sathyapal; 21 August 1956 (age 69); Thripunithura, Eranakulam, Kerala, India
- Occupations: Artist, painter, writer
- Awards: Kerala Lalithakala Akademi in 2005

Sathyapal T.A (born 1956 at Thrippunithura in Ernakulam District of Kerala) is an Indian painter and writer from Kerala. He paints portraits and derives his inspiration from Indian tribal arts.

Sathyapal won the Kerala Lalithakala Akademi Award. He is the former secretary and chairman of the Kerala Lalithakala Akademi.

== Books on art ==
- 2011 - Native Art of India

== Awards and honours ==
- 2005 Kerala Lalithakala Akademi Award.
- 2011 Alvas Varna Virasath Award.
