= Calla lily =

Calla lily is a common name of several members of the family, Araceae. It may refer to:

- Calla palustris
- Zantedeschia generally
  - Zantedeschia aethiopica specifically

Botanical name: Zantedeschia spp. and hybrids
