= Harikrishna Prasad Gupta Agrahari =

Dr. Harikrishna Prasad Gupta Agrahari (born 25 February 1950, Parsauni Bhatta, Nepal) is a Hindi and Nepali language poet in the modern generation of Hindi poetry. He is known for his contribution in Nepali as well as Hindi literature. He completed Bachelor of Science and received a doctorate of philosophy degree from India and Hungary. His research letter was rewarded by Budapest University, Hungary. Gupta has published almost the two dozen of his books in various genres.

Here is a Ghazal of his:

याद तुम्हारी ले आती है;
रात न जाने क्यों आती है।
शीतलता भी अब तन-मन में;
ना जाने क्यों झुलसाती है।
शाम ढले परछाई हमसे;
चुपके-चुपके बतियाती है।
झील लगे जंगल में जैसे;
पायलिया-सी खनकाती है।
तपते मन पर आँख की बदली;
शीतल आँसू बरसाती है।
कोयल चुप ही रहती है या;
गीत खुशी के ही गाती है।
बीच भँवर में हिम्मत हमको;
जीवन जीना सिखलाती है।
चाक किया जाना है सीना;
धरती फिर भी मुसकाती है।
पी सकता है विष ये 'अग्रहरि' ही;
फौलादी उसकी छाती है।।

— 'Dr. Karikrishna Prasad Gupta "Agrahari"
