= Kattoor Narayana Pillai =

Indian artist

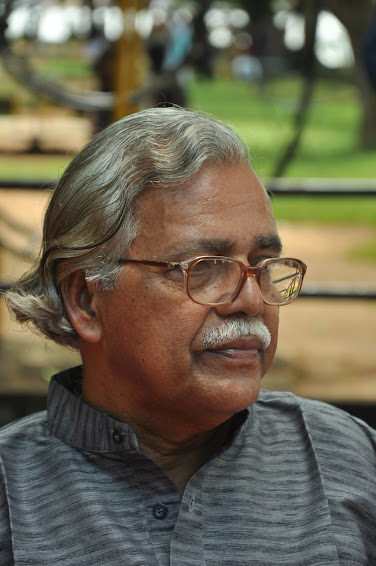
- Kattoor Narayana Pillai
- Awards: Junior Fellowship of Central Department of Culture

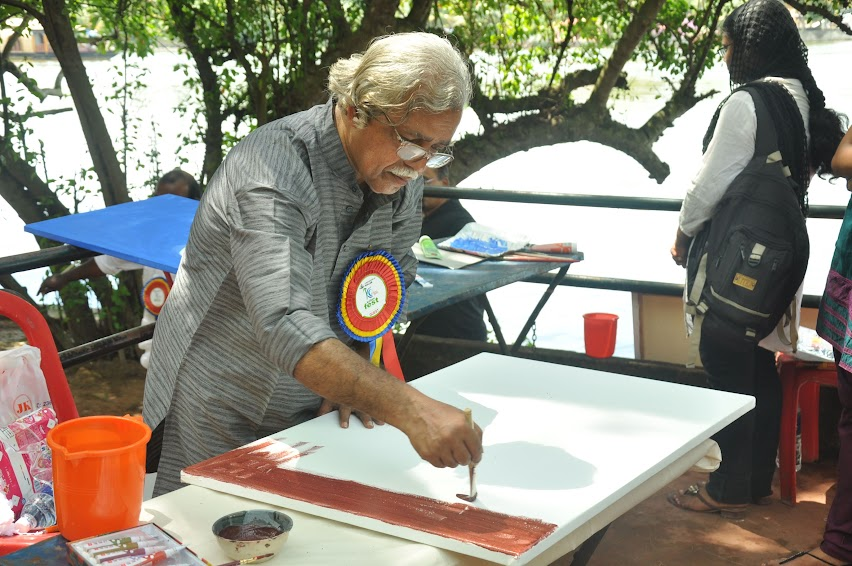
Kattoor G Narayana Pillai at Kollam Fest 2011, National Painters camp

Kattoor Narayana Pillai (born 1946) is an artist and former chairman of Kerala Lalithakala Akademi. He has experimented with almost all media in painting during his three-decade-long career as an artist and art academician. He is the former principal of the College of Fine Arts, Thiruvananthapuram.

== Biography ==
Pillai was born in Mavelikkara in 1946. He graduated from Raja Ravivarma School of Painting and Chennai Arts and Craft College. He received the Junior Fellowship of the Central Department of Culture. He is the author of Rupa Parinamam in Chitrakala.
