= Hare Krishna =

Hare Krishna may refer to:

- International Society for Krishna Consciousness, a group commonly known as "Hare Krishnas" or the "Hare Krishna movement"
- Hare Krishna (mantra), a sixteen-word Vaishnava mantra also known as the "Maha Mantra" (Great Mantra)

== See also ==
- Hari Krishnan (disambiguation)
- Hare Rama Hare Krishna (disambiguation)
