= Mammiyur Krishnan Kutty Nair =

Indian artist

- Born: Guruvayoor, Thrissur district, Kerala, India
- Occupations: Mural artist, founder of Guruvayoor Devaswom Mural Painting Institute, Kerala India

Mammiyur Krishnan Kutty Nair was a prominent modern day mural artist from Kerala, India. He also founded the Guruvayoor Devaswom Mural Painting Institute. By finding space for mural art outside the temples, he advocated for its recognition as a legacy. When Guruvayoor Devaswam wanted to renovate its murals after a fire in the early 1970s temple murals were renovated under Mammiyur Krishnan Kutty Nair's guidance.

== See also ==
- Kerala mural painting
- Sathyapal T. A
