= Rahimpur =

- Village
- Location in Punjab, India Rahimpur (India)
- Coordinates: 31.2349091°N 75.4124433°E
- Country: India
- State: Punjab
- District: Jalandhar
- Tehsil: Nakodar

Government
  - Type: Panchayat raj
  - Body: Gram panchayat
- Elevation: 240 m (790 ft)

Population (2011)
  - Total: 1,690
- Sex ratio 904/786 ♂/♀

Languages
  - Official: Punjabi
- Time zone: UTC+5:30 (IST)
- ISO 3166 code: IN-PB
- Website: jalandhar.nic.in

Rahimpur is a village in Nakodar in Jalandhar district of Punjab State, India. It is located 15 kilometres (9.3 mi) from Nakodar, 21 kilometres (13 mi) from Kapurthala, 22 kilometres (14 mi) from district headquarter Jalandhar and 171 kilometres (106 mi) from state capital Chandigarh. The village is administered by Sarpanch an elected representative of the village.

== Transport ==
Nakodar railway station is the nearest train station. The village is 77 kilometres (48 mi) away from the domestic airport in Ludhiana and the nearest international airport is located in Chandigarh. Sri Guru Ram Dass Jee International Airport, 101 kilometres (63 mi) away in Amritsar, is the next nearest.
