= Kerala Lalithakala Akademi =

Autonomous fine arts body in Kerala, India

- Official logo

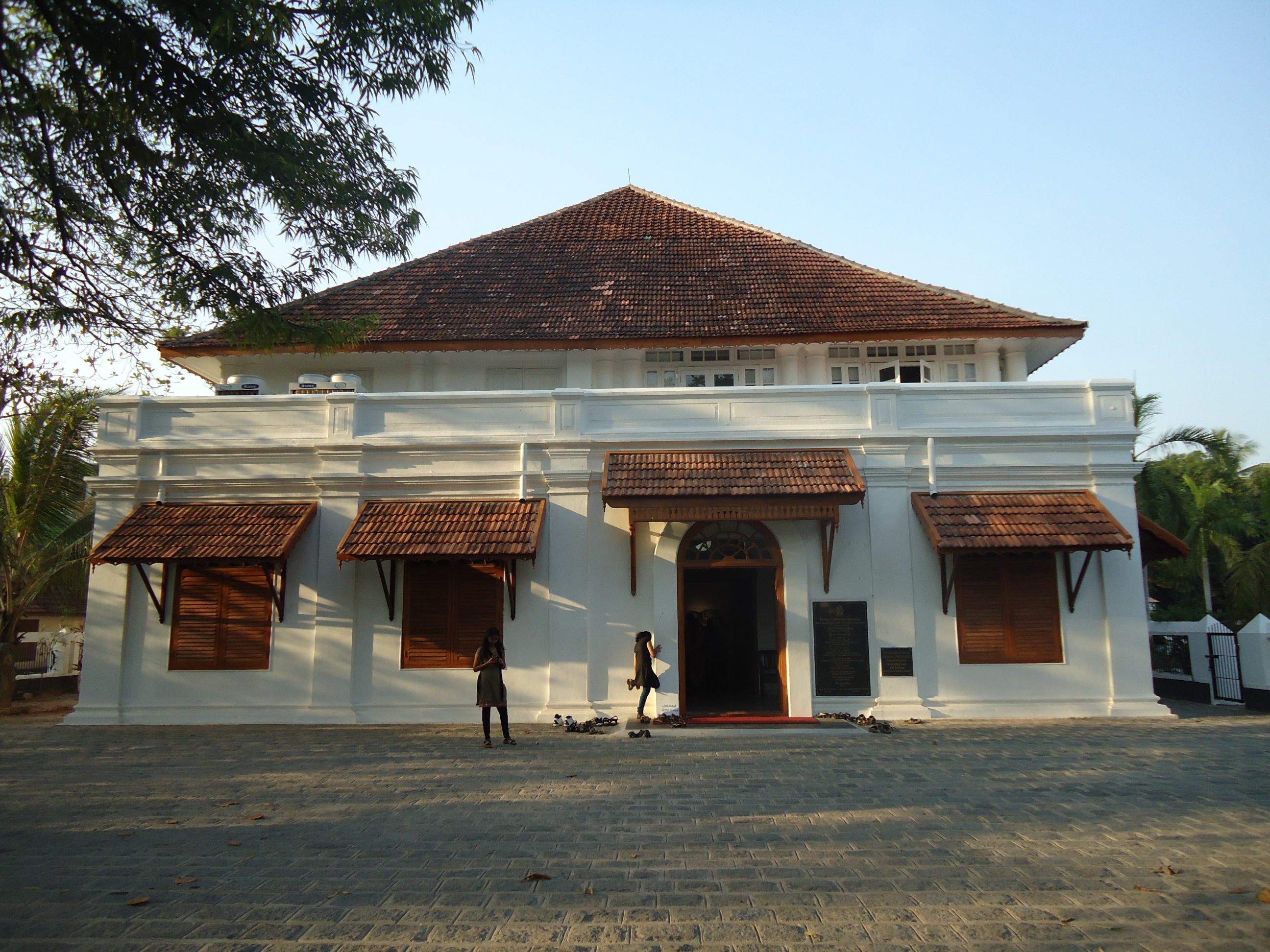
- Durbar Hall Art Centre, managed by the Akademi
- Abbreviation: KLA
- Formation: 1962
- Type: Autonomous body
- Legal status: Active
- Purpose: Promotion of fine arts and cultural heritage
- Headquarters: Thrissur, Kerala, India
- Coordinates: 10°31′58.33″N 76°13′5.69″E
- Region served: India
- Official language: Malayalam, English
- Chairman: Murali Cheeroth (since 2022)
- Main organ: Executive Committee
- Parent organisation: Department of Cultural Affairs, Kerala
- Website: www.lalithkala.org

Kerala Lalithakala Akademi is an autonomous cultural organization established in Kerala, India, in 1962. Its primary purpose is to promote and propagate fine arts such as painting, sculpture, and visual arts in the state. The Akademi functions under the Government of Kerala, although its constitution provides for operational autonomy.

== History ==
The Akademi was established in 1962 as part of the Kerala government's broader cultural policy to support and encourage artistic talent and activities in the state. It is modeled on the national-level Lalit Kala Akademi and serves as the apex body for visual arts in Kerala. The organization's headquarters is located in Thrissur, widely considered the cultural capital of the state.

Murali Cheeroth was appointed as chairman in January 2022, succeeding previous office-bearers such as noted artists Kattoor Narayana Pillai and Sathyapal T. A.

== Activities ==
The Akademi conducts exhibitions, art camps, workshops, and seminars throughout Kerala to promote artistic expression. It also manages art galleries such as the Durbar Hall Art Centre in Kochi and the Lalithakala Akademi Art Gallery in Thrissur.

A major event it organizes is the annual state-level visual arts exhibition that recognizes outstanding works of painting and sculpture. It also bestows awards, fellowships, and scholarships to emerging and established artists.

== Administration ==
Although funded and overseen by the Kerala Department of Cultural Affairs, the Akademi operates as an autonomous institution with its own governing council. The council is composed of eminent artists and cultural administrators nominated by the government and selected through artistic circles.

== Notable people ==
- Kattoor Narayana Pillai, former chairman
- Sathyapal T. A, former chairman

== See also ==
- Arts of Kerala
- Lalit Kala Akademi
- Kerala Sangeetha Nataka Akademi
- Kerala Sahitya Akademi
