= List of Nepalese artists =

The following list of notable Nepalese artists (in alphabetical order by last name) includes artists of various genres, who are notable and are either born in Nepal, of Nepalese descent or who produce works that are primarily about Nepal.

== A ==
- Araniko (1245–1306), Nepal Mandala painter, and key figure in artistic exchange with the Yuan dynasty of China

== B ==
- Lain Singh Bangdel (1919–2002), painter, novelist, and art historian
- Manjul Baraili (born 1980), sculptor

== C ==
- Premman Chitrakar (1944–2020), Paubha artist, poet, and writer
- Raj Man Singh Chitrakar (1797–1865), watercolorist, painter, and illustrator; worked in the British and Nepalese courts as a painter

== D ==
- Sabita Dangol (born 1984), contemporary visual artist

== G ==
- Pramila Giri, Nepalese-born sculptor, and painter; based in Norway
- Prabal Gurung (born 1979), Nepalese-born fashion designer; based in New York City

== K ==
- Bijay Prasad Koirala, From Nepal and a freelance artist for over 20 years. His work medium is acrylic on canvas, water on paper, and charcoal on paper.

== M ==
- Thakur Prasad Mainali (born 1934), sculptor, educator; chief of arts and craft department of the Royal Nepal Academy
- Kiran Manandhar (born 1957), painter; founding chancellor of the Nepal Academy of Fine Arts
- Chandra Man Singh Maskey (1900–1984), painter, and illustrator; early 20th century leader in the development of Nepali contemporary art

== N ==
- Uttam Nepali (1937–2021), Modernist painter, writer, and actor

== P ==
- Naresh Dev Pant (born 1974), photographer, graphic designer, filmmaker, muralist, painter, and web designer
- Suman Pokhrel (born 1967), poet, lyricist, playwright, translator and artist

== R ==
- Milan Rai (born 1984), contemporary visual artist, conceptual artist, and social practice artist
- Sheelasha Rajbhandari (born 1988), multidisciplinary visual artist, curator, and cultural organizer
- Ashmina Ranjit (born 1966), performance and conceptual artist, and activist

== S ==
- Shashi Bikram Shah (born 1940), contemporary painter, and draftsperson
- Sushma Shakya (born 1975), printmaker, illustrator, video artist, and installation artist
- Deepak Shimkhada (born 1945), Nepali-born painter, Asian art historian, educator, writer, and editor; based in California
- Sushma Shimkhada (1939–2018), sculptor
- Kalidas Shrestha (1923–2016), painter, sculptor, arts administrator, and social activist; founded the Nepal Fine Arts College
- Sabita Dangol (born 1984), contemporary painter, performance artist
- Sneha Shrestha, street artist, contemporary painter, educator, and arts administrator

== U ==
- Shail Upadhya (1935–2013), fashion designer, diplomat, and United Nations disarmament expert
- Ragini Upadhyaya (born 1959), painter, and printmaker

== See also ==
- List of Nepalese people
  - List of Nepalese writers
  - List of Nepalese poets
- Ralpha, leftist cultural movement in Nepal
