= Nepalese painting =

Nepalese painting
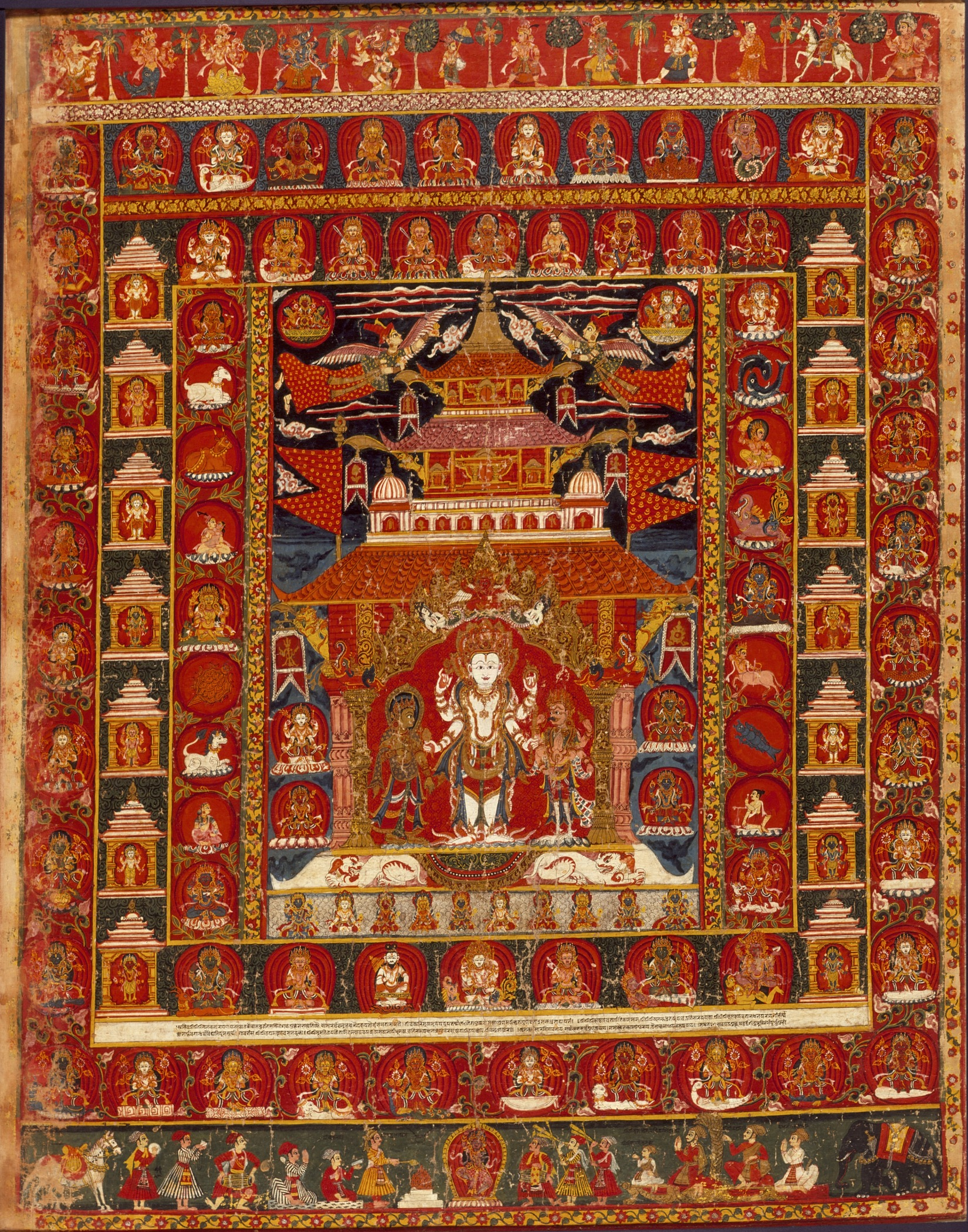
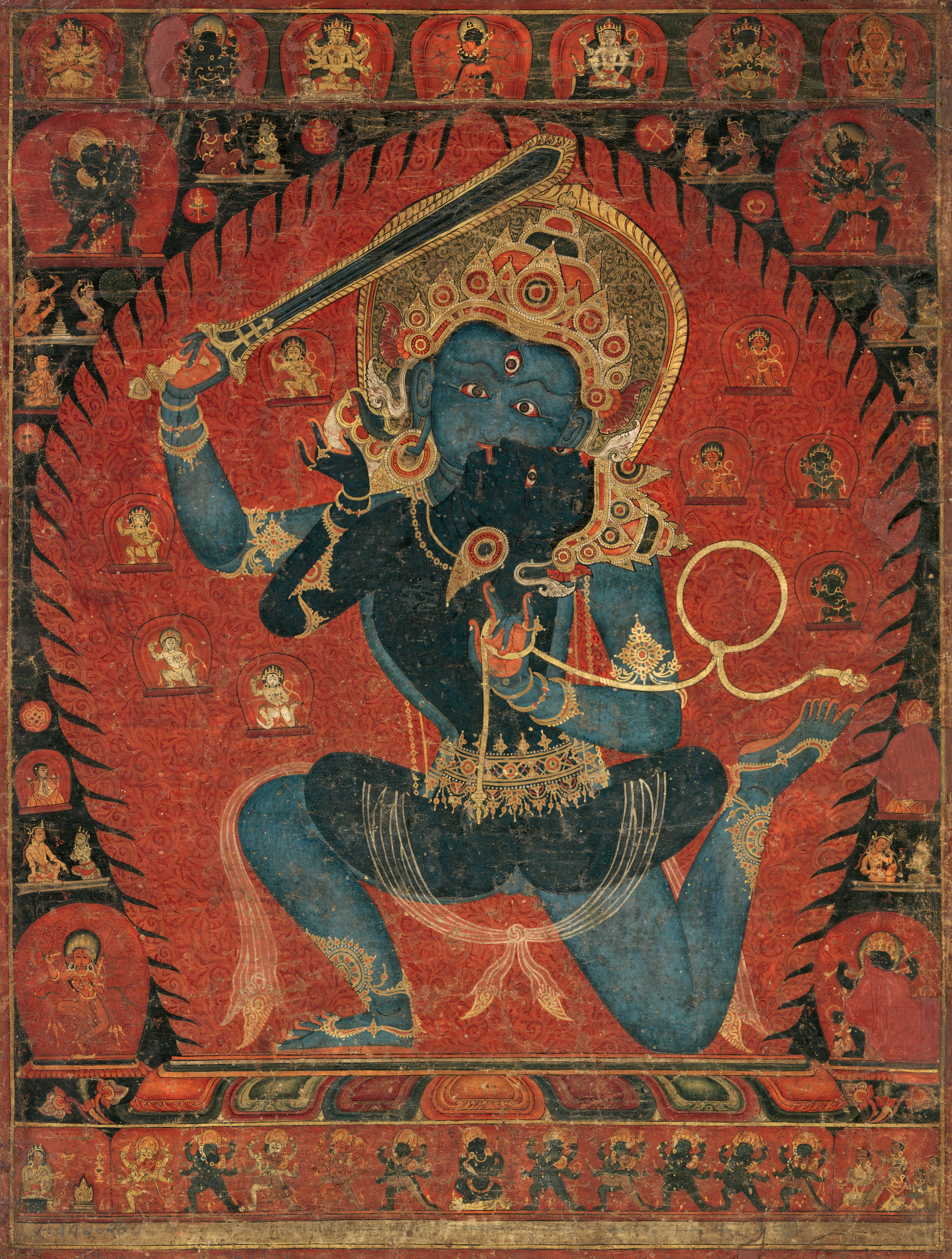
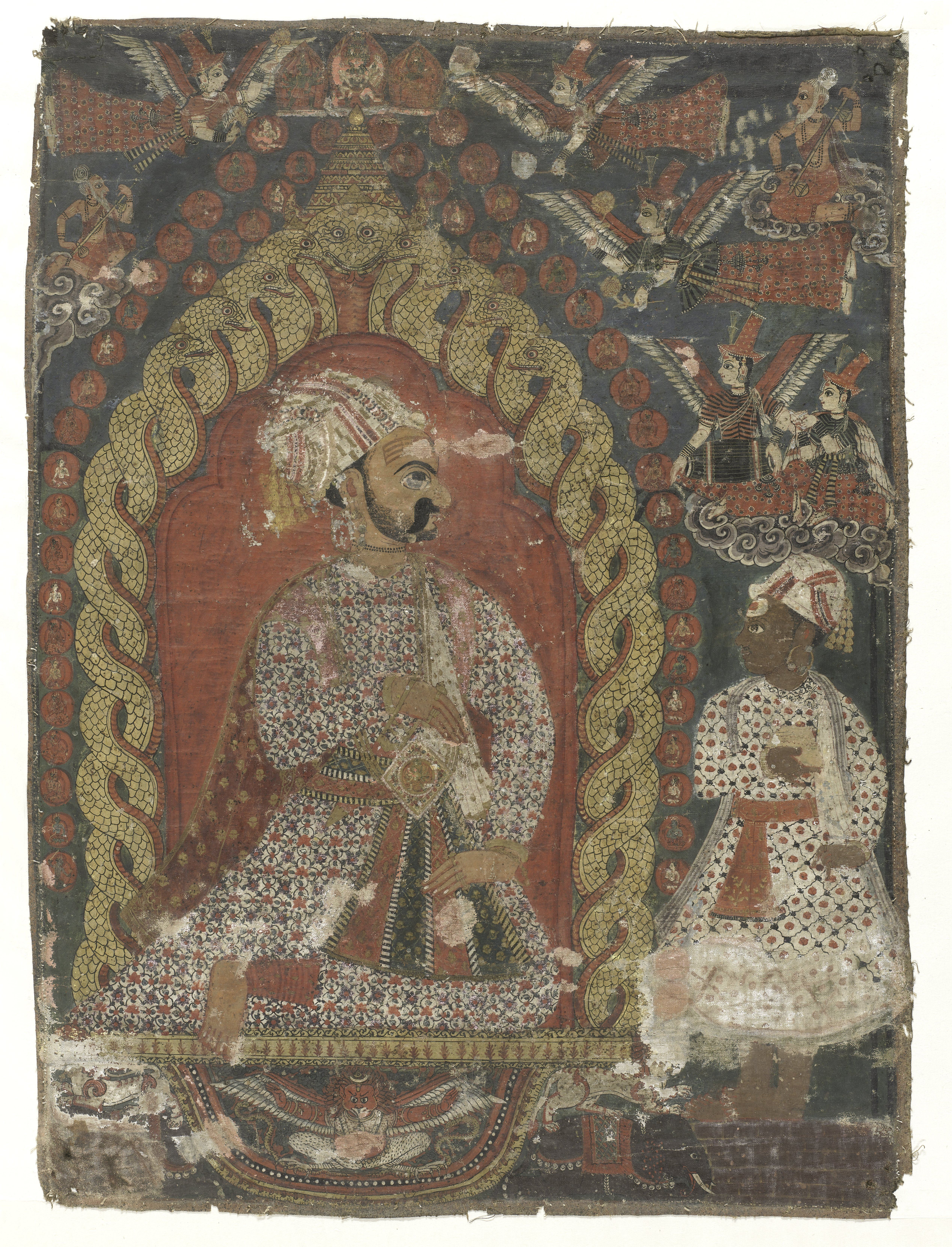
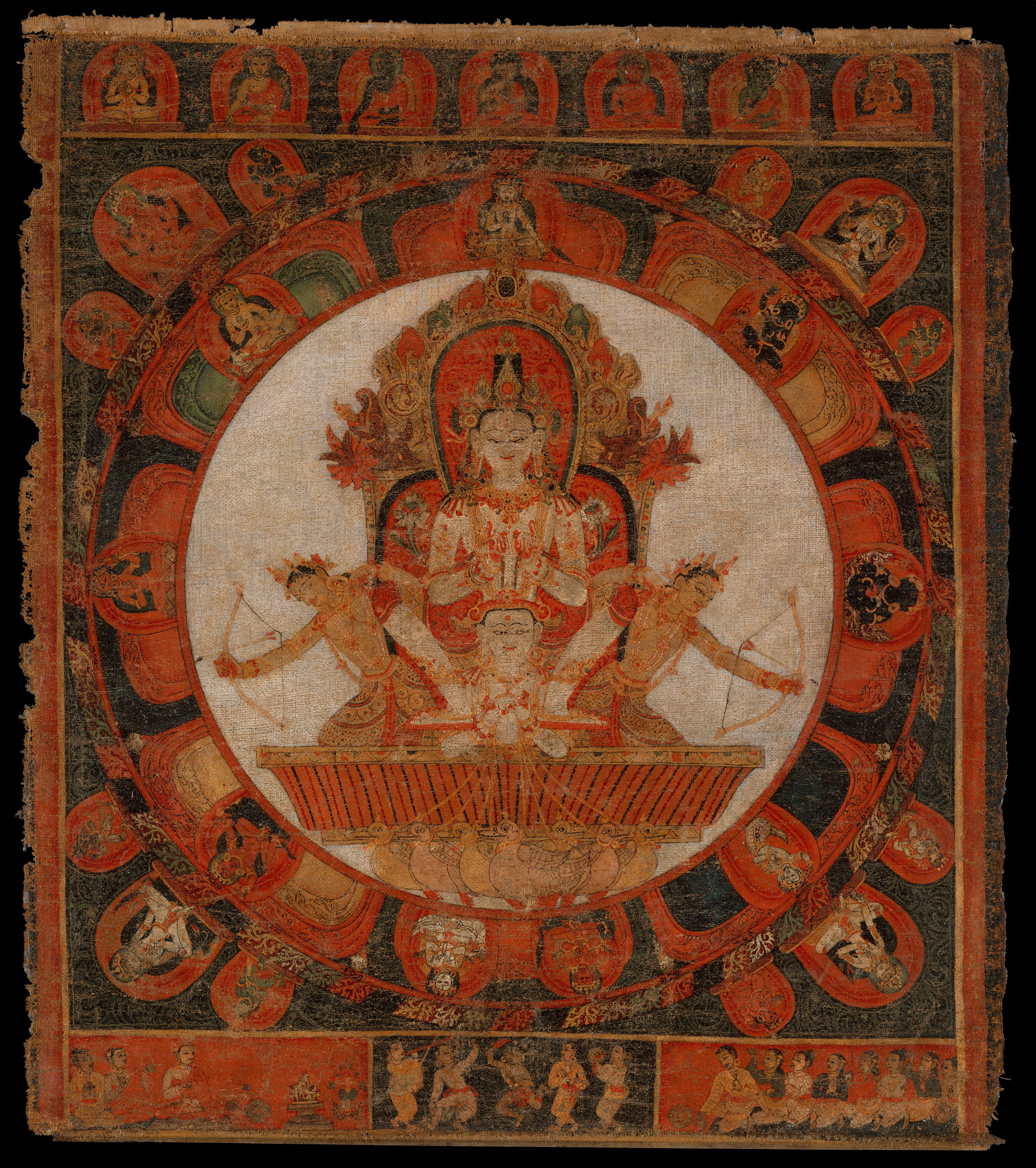
Clockwise from upper left: Vishnu Mandala (1681), Acala with his consort, Vishvavajri (1522–1550), Bhupatindra Malla (1700–1722), Mandala of the moon god Chandra (early 15th century).

Nepalese Painting or Nepali Painting begins with the religious paintings with Hindu and Buddhist subjects, almost all Newa art by the Newari people of the Kathmandu Valley. These traditional paintings can be found in the form of either wall paintings, cloth paintings called paubha, or manuscripts. They used conservative technique, style, and iconography in their works for centuries.

Nepalese paintings believed to have embraced western influences after 1850 with a work of Bhajuman [Chitrakar], a traditional artist who became acquainted with western Realism after visiting Europe. Bhajuman, also known as Bhajumacha Chitrakar, was a court painter of Jung Bahadur Rana, who visited Europe in 1850 after becoming Prime Minister of Nepal. As a member of the new prime minister's entourage, Bhajuman also visited Paris and London. Soon after the return, western Realism supposedly influenced Bhajuman's paintings, marking the start of modern trend. An unsigned painting - supposedly to have painted by Bhajuman - depicts a Thapa General in a full military regalia. This painting remained a pivotal example of considerable departure from an established traditional school of Nepali painting to the western school of art practice. However, the recent discovery of the illustrations by Raj Man Singh Chitrakar (1797-1865) for his patron a British Resident Brian Houghton Hodgson, sheds light on the western Realism entering Nepal way before the influences brought in by Bhajuman Chitrakar.S to Nepalese people

== 7th to 19th century paintings of Nepal ==
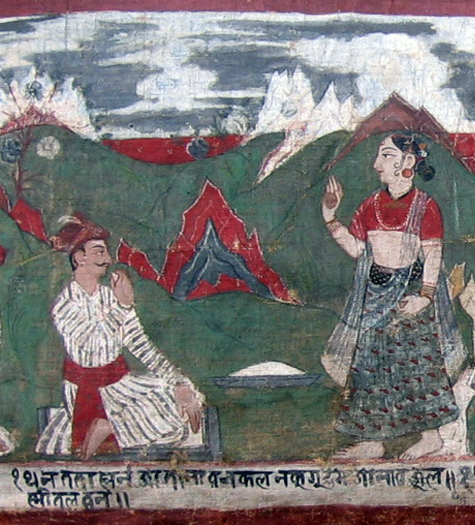
Kesh Chandra (A mythical character in the folklore in Kathmandu) and his sister; A picture dated 1223 AD

Mithila Painting is practiced in the Mithila region of Nepal and India. This tradition dates back to country the 7th century AD. Mithila painting is done with twigs, fingers, natural dyes and pigments. Artists make pictures of natural objects like sun, moon, and deities from mythological epics, royal courts, and weddings. Researchers have discovered much Buddhist art in caves of Mustang area which dates back to 12 century or earlier. Style, technique, materials and subject of painting differed with the ethnic origin of the artists. Artists from the Newar community made most of the paintings that illuminated Buddhist manuscripts and book covers as well as devotional paintings on cloth. Newari artists were renowned throughout Asia for the high quality of their workmanship. Newari painting style 'Beri' was famous in Tibet. Beri was adopted as Tibet's universal painting style in the 14th century.

== Nepalese Painting 1900-1950 ==
The remarkable entry of the western school of art practice is noticed in Nepali painting only after the return of two young artists Tej Bahadur Chitrakar 1898-1971 and Chandra Man Singh Maskey in late 1920s. They both joined Government School of Art in Calcutta to learn to paint by observing life and nature-concept of tonal effects, colors and the most important - the application and the use of modern paint mediums like oil, water, charcoal, pastel etc. Very few works of Chandra Man Singh Maskey are accessible to the public. However, with the publication of the book Tej Bahadur Chitrakar - icon of transition written by his heir Madan Chitrakar in 2004 and a grand post-humous retrospective of Tej Bahadur Chitrakar "Images of a Lifetime--: A Historical Perspective" organised by Siddhartha Art Gallery in 2005 have emphasised on his contribution for the development of Nepali painting. Tej Bahadur Chitrakar played an important role practising in both traditional Nepali art as well as western ways of painting. Simultaneously he is also fondly remembered as a dedicated teacher who shared his knowledge to many aspiring artists of his time. Under the tutelage of Tej Bahadur, Dil Bahadur Chitrakar versed himself in various paint mediums especially pastel techniques whilst Amar Chitrakar became an expert in water color and oil and became one of the beloved Nepali artists.

== Nepalese Painting 1950-1990 ==
The arrival of Lain Singh Bangdel (1919–2002) in 1961 marks as an introduction to Modern Art in Nepal. He brought with him, the exposure to Modern art movements from Paris to a country which was slowly opening to the world only after 1950s. With the patronage of King Mahendra, Lain Singh Bangdel introduced abstract art to the Nepali audience. In 1972 he was appointed as an academician of Royal Nepal Academy by King Birendra. Similarly Nepali contemporary Nepali artist Laxman Shrestha (1939) currently based in Mumbai.

Juddha Kala Pathshala was the only institute where art was taught formally during those days. Many of the young enthusiasts opted India to study art under various scholarship programs. After the return of young artists such as Uttam Nepali, [Manuj Babu Mishra], Shashi Bikram Shah, Batsa Gopal Baidhya], Krishna Manandhar, Rama Nanda Joshi, Thakur Prasad Mainali, Deepak Shimkhada, Sushma Shimkhada, Pramila Giri, Indra Pradhan, Karna Narsingh Rana, K.K. Karmacharya, Shashi Kala Tiwari, Nepali art flourished into a collective modern phase. Artists like Kiran Manandhar First Chancellor of Nepal Academy of Fine Arts, Karna Maskey, Ragini Upadhyay, Uma Shankar Shah, Pramesh Adhikari, Yuwak Tuladhar, Birendra Pratap Singh, Surendra Bhattarai, Sharad Ranjit, Ang Tsherin Sherpa Very Dynamic contemporary artist succeeded as a young and vibrant generation during 1980s. Outside of Kathmandu, Durga Baral is noted for his contributions from Pokhara.
