= Simkhada =

Simkhada or Shimkhada (Nepali: सिम्खडा) is a surname belonging to the Khas people of both the Bahun and Chhetri caste from Nepal.

Notable people with the surname Simkhada include:

- Deepak Shimkhada, born September 5, 1945) is a Nepali American educator, artist, art historian, author and community leader
- Sushma Shimkhada, Nepali sculptor
- Rejena Simkhada, member of Hong Kong canto pop group Collar with the name Day
