= Sujan Chitrakar =

Nepalese artist and professor

- Born: Sujan Chitrakar; 1974 (age 51–52); Kathmandu, Nepal

Sujan Chitrakar [Nepali:सुजन चित्रकार] is a Nepalese artist who currently is the Academic Program Coordinator and an Assistant Professor for Kathmandu University’s School of Art, Center for Art and Design. Besides his teaching career Chitrakar is regarded as an active art activist in Nepal.

== Introduction ==
Sujan Chitrakar was born in 1974 AD in Kathmandu. Sujan belongs to a Chitrakar family, which a traditional artist among the Newar Community. His third solo exhibition “Let’s Talk about ART baby!” was colossally famous among the Nepalese art community and earned him praise from many other uprising artists. Senior artist and art writer Madan Chitrakar took his time to describe about Sujan Chitrakar and his exhibition. Chitrakar led a reconstruction program for Bungamati, after the 2015 Nepal earthquake entitled Rebuilding Bungamati.

== PortFolio ==
Who will love my Brother?

Let's Talk about Art Baby!
