= Chitrakar =

Caste in Nepal

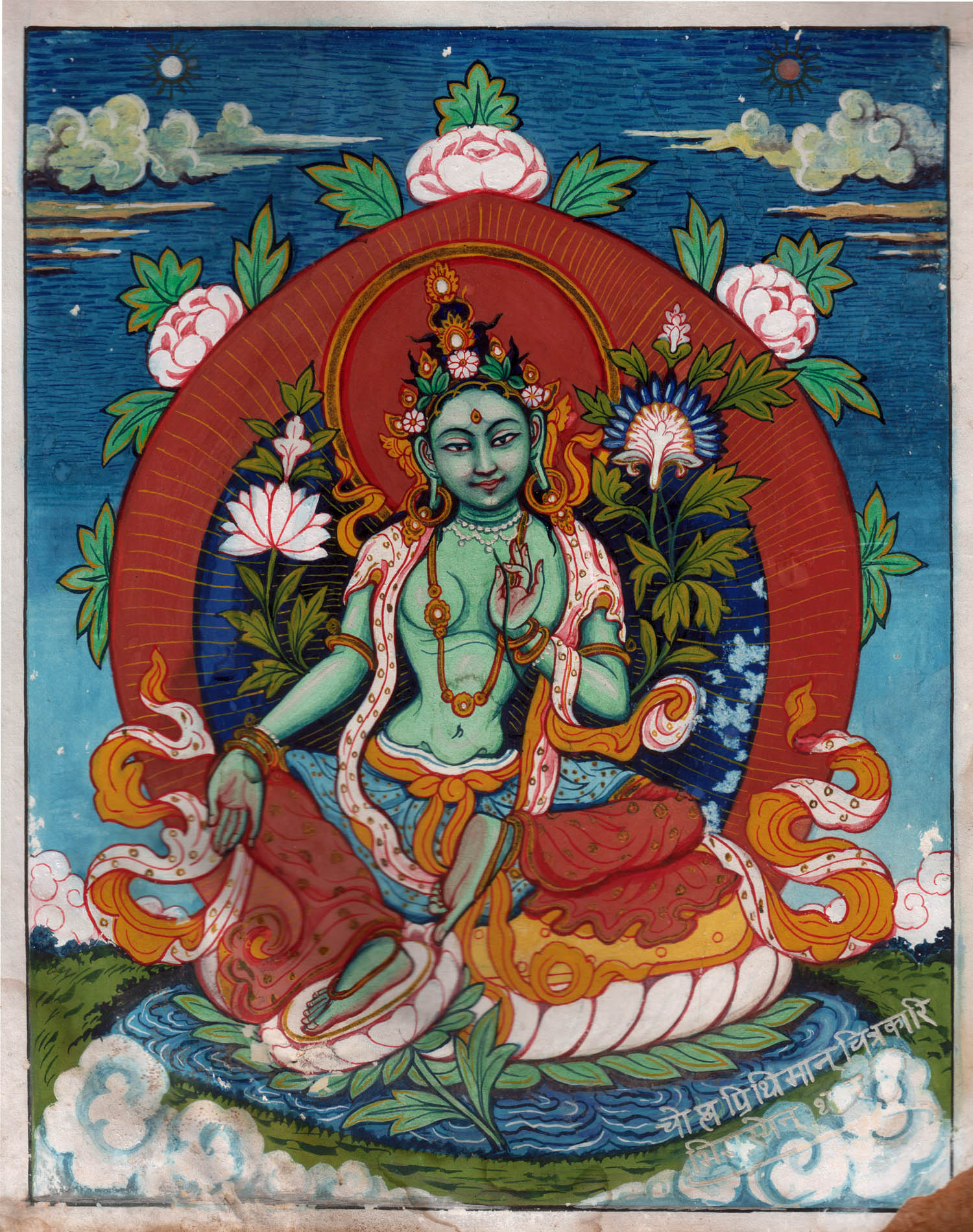
1947 painting of Buddhist goddess Green Tara by Prithvi Man Chitrakari

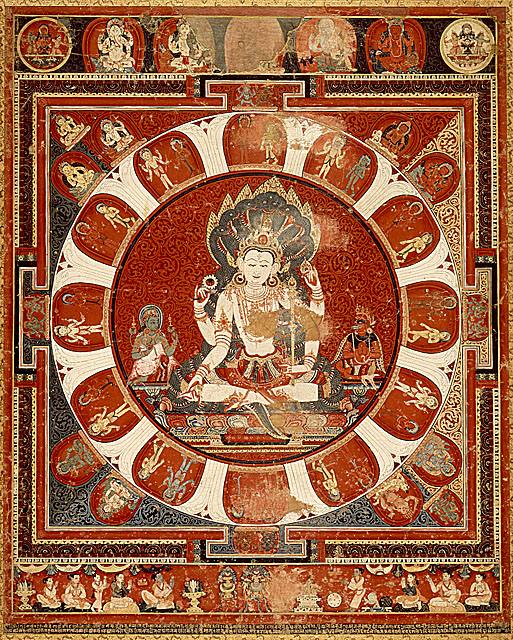
Paubha painting showing Vishnu Mandala (15th century)

Chitrakar (Devanagari: चित्रकार) is a caste within the Newar community of the Kathmandu Valley in Nepal. The Newar caste system is divided according to profession. Accordingly, Chitrakars were painters and mask makers.

In Nepal Bhasa (the language of the Newar community), this caste is called "pun" (पुं) or "puna".

The literal translation of the word "chitrakar" from Sanskrit is 'image maker', where "chitrá" in Sanskrit means 'an image', and "kara" 'the maker'.

== Traditional occupation ==
The Pun or Chitrakar paint paubhas used in prayer rooms and murals in temples, make masks used for ritual dances, paintings on ceramics and woodblock prints used during festivals. The craft is handed down from father to son according to the division of labour laid down from ancient times. Women generally play a secondary role in the artistic ventures.

Ethnically, Chitrakars like other Newar communities are of diverse origin including various Indo-Aryan and Tibeto-Burman tribes. So, one may infer that Chitrakars are heterogeneous groups rather that a kin or ethnically homogeneous group. Although the caste system is eroding in Kathmandu, there are still some Pun/Chitrakar families following their traditional role as artists. The Puns/Chitrakars practice both Buddhism and Hinduism with an emphasis on Tantrism.

In the French scholar Gerard Toffin's work on the painter Chitrakars, he focuses on their two main guthis (See Guthi and Desla Guthi), kinship and marriage patterns and, of course, their art, which sometimes functions as medicine. Toffin describes how they treat Jwanakai, which is thought to be caused by snakes, by painting two lions on the sides of the affected area.

The word "Pun" seems to have been derived from Pali/Sanskrit word "puantra"/"patta" or "scrolls/fabric". The religious painting called "Paubhas" is also a derivative of the "Puantra/Patta". These paintings are normally done over fabric/cotton gessoed with animal glue and clay.

== Notable Chitrakars ==
- Jayateja Puna (circa early 15th century): He is mentioned in the dedicatory inscription in the 1420AD Vishnu Mandala as having rendered that painting.
- Adyayaraja Puna and Udrayarama Puna (Circa late 15th century): Painted famous painting of Gagansimh, a high-ranking military officer from Dolakha, with his two wives.
- Indraraja Chitrakara and Jogideva Chitrakara (Circa 17th century): Mentioned in 17th century model-book (thayasafoo).
- Raj Man Singh Chitrakar (1797–1865): Introduced watercolor painting in Nepal, official artist to British Resident Brian Houghton Hodgson.
- Bhaju Man Chitrakar: Artist/court painter, travelled with Prime Minister Jang Bahadur Rana to England and France in 1850.
- Dirgha Man Chitrakar: Court photographer, one of the first Nepalese photographers, he used large format cameras and wet plates. Accompanied Prime Minister Chandra Shamsher to England in 1908.
- Ganesh Man Chitrakar: Photographer, the first aerial photographs of Nepal were taken by him.
- Kazi Krishna Lal Chitrakar: Worked for King Tribhuvan Bir Bikram Shah and attained the position of Kazi, which was one of the highest civil rankings at that time.
- Tej Bahadur Chitrakar (1898–1971): Famous painter, Head of Juddha Art School, Initiated 'Chitrakala Udhyog Sangh' (now defunct). Prime Minister Chandra Shamsher Jang Bahadur Rana sponsored his training at Government Art School in Kolkata heralding a change in Nepalese art scene from traditional religious art to modern Western-style paintings.
- Amar Chitrakar: Artist, life member of the Royal Nepal Academy, his paintings are in museums and private collections.
- Dil Bahadur Chitrakar: Artist.
- Manik Man Chitrakar: Paubha Artist
- Prithvi Man Chitrakar: Artist
- Dhana Bahadur Chitrakar: Artist
- Manoharman Puna (Manoharman Chitrakar) (1914–1990): Artist
- Madan Chitrakar: Artist, Art Writer
- Lok Chitrakar: Artist, Art Teacher
- Sujan Chitrakar: Artist, Art Activist and BFA Program Coordinator at Kathmandu University, School of Art, Center for Art and Design
- Prem Man Chitrakar: Nepalese Paubha artist, poet and writer.

== Organizations ==
- Chitrakar Samaj/The Chitrakar Society
- The Chitrakar Society and Himalasia Foundation
