= Deepak Shimkhada =

Nepali American educator, artist, and author (born 1945)

- Shimkhada in 2016
- Born: September 5, 1945 (age 81); Darkha, Nepal
- Education: Claremont Graduate University (PhD) (2001); University of Southern California, MA (1975); Maharaja Sayajirao University of Baroda, (BFA), (1968), (MFA) (1970)
- Occupations: Educator, artist, art historian, author
- Years active: 1968–present
- Organizations: Indic Foundation; Himalayan Arts Council
- Board member of: South Asian Studies Association
- Spouse: Kanti Shimkhada
- Children: Leepi Shimkhada-Mahalingam; Riti Shimkhada

Deepak Shimkhada (Nepali: दीपक सिंखडा) (born September 5, 1945) is a Nepalese-American with a diverse professional background, including work as an Asian art historian, educator, writer, editor, and painter. He currently serves as an adjunct professor at Chaffey College in Rancho Cucamonga, California, and has previously held visiting and adjunct positions at several U.S. universities, including Scripps College, Claremont Graduate University, California State University, Northridge, University of the West, and Claremont School of Theology. His teaching career began in 1980, and while he has retired from full-time teaching, he continues to teach Asian art part-time at Chaffey College.

He holds the position of founding president in two organizations, namely the Foundation for Indic Philosophy and Culture (Indic Foundation) and the Himalayan Arts Council. In his career, Shimkhada has actively contributed to several institutions, including Asian Studies on the Pacific Coast and the America-Nepal Society of California, where he also held the position of president. His leadership extended to serving as the Chair of the Hindu Council on the Board of Visitors for the School of Religion at Claremont Graduate University from 2006 to 2012. Furthermore, he played a foundational role as a board member in the South Asian Studies Association (SASA).

He has an extensive publication record, including journal and newspaper articles, book chapters, and edited books. His artistic endeavors encompass exhibitions of his paintings and graphics, which have been displayed in group and solo shows in various countries, including Nepal, India, Japan, and the United States. Additionally, he has made appearances as a commentator in several episodes of the History Channel series Ancient Aliens.

== Early life and education ==
Shimkhada was born on September 5, 1945, in Darkha, Nepal to Ratna Prasad Shimkhada and Kausalya Devi Shimkhada. He attended JP High School in Kathmandu and completed SLC in 1960. He completed IA in Economics from Saraswati College in Kathmandu in 1962.

In 1962, upon receiving a scholarship from the Government of India, Shimkhada left for India to pursue higher education in fine arts. He studied at The Maharaja Sayajirao University of Baroda and received a bachelor's degree in fine arts in 1968. He received his master's degree in fine arts with a focus on art criticism in 1970 from the same university. In 1972, he received a Fulbright fellowship to study art history and moved to Los Angeles in the United States. He is considered among the first few Nepalis to immigrate to the U.S. He earned his Master of Arts in art history from the University of Southern California in 1975. Shimkhada earned his PhD in education from Claremont Graduate University in 2001. His dissertation was in art and religion using semiotics as a methodology to analyze them.

== Career ==
=== Fine arts career ===
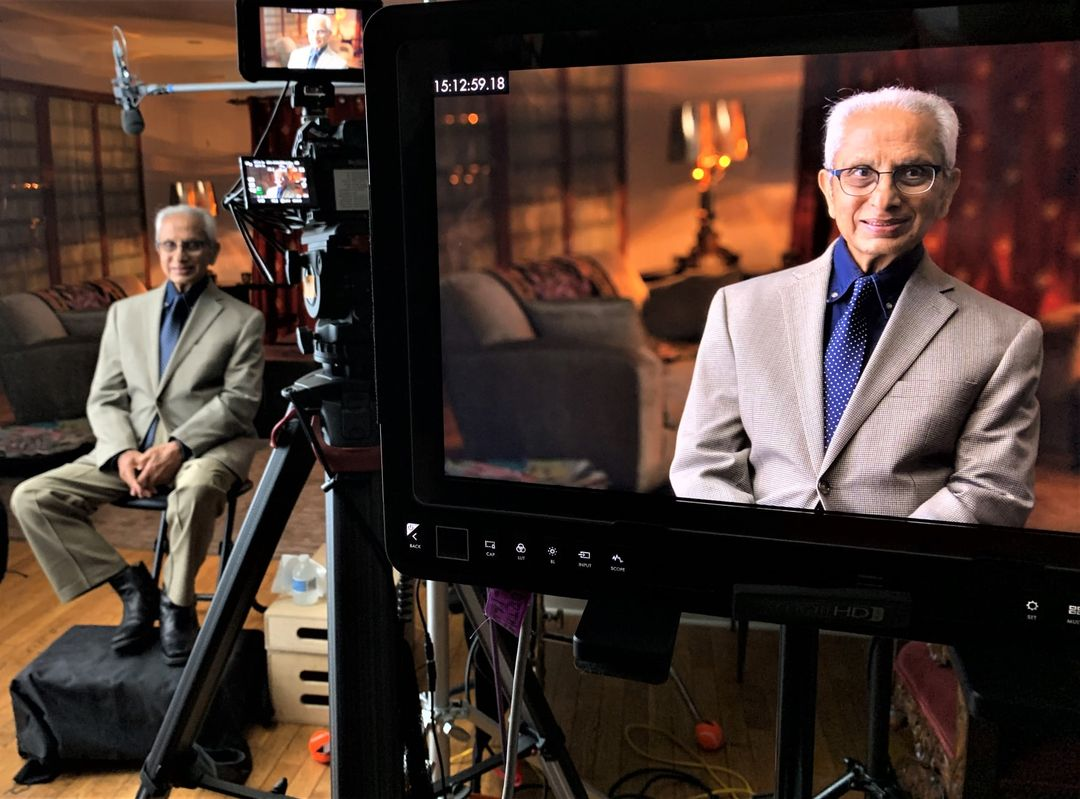
Interview-On the Set of AA

Shimkhada's professional career as an artist began in 1968 when he had his first one-man show of paintings in Max Gallery in Kathmandu, Nepal. In 1971, in the second Triennale of World Contemporary Art held in New Delhi, India, one of his paintings was selected as the best work from Nepal and was featured in its exhibition catalogue. He had several private shows of his works in Beverly Hills, California in 1973 and 1974. He exhibited his last work in Chicago Public Library in 1977.

=== Teaching career ===
Shimkhada began his teaching career as a lecturer of Asian art history at Scripps College in Claremont, California, in 1980. At that time he had just returned from India after conducting his field research for his PhD dissertation under the aegis of American Institute of Indian Studies (AIIS). Since 1980 he has lived in Claremont and has performed various duties as administrator and professor teaching art history at various colleges and universities in Southern California.

Shimkhada began contributing articles on Nepali art, culture, philosophy, and religion to various newspapers and journals in Nepal during the early 1970s. His research work in these areas commenced in 1973 with the publication of his first paper in "Arts of Asia." This was followed by a series of articles published in "Artibus Asiae" and "Oriental Art" in 1983.

== Books ==
=== Books (authored and edited) ===
- (2026) Nagas & The Birth of the Kathmandu Valley New Delhi: Dev Publishers. ISBN 978-93-5944-050-7
- (2026) Gods in Captivity: The Journey of Buddha and Shiva to the City of Angels. New Delhi: Dev Publishers. ISBN 978-9359446097
- (2024) Nepal: Historical Study of a Hindu Kingdom, Volume I and II by Sylvain Levi. Translated by Mary Harris and Edited by Deepak Shimkhada. Foreword by Pratapaditya Pal. Published by Mandala Book Point, Kathmandu, Nepal. ISBN 978-99933-42-63-2
- (2022) Nepal: Historical Study of a Hindu Kingdom by Sylvain Levi. Translated in English from French by Mary Harris. Edited and annotated by Deepak Shimkhada. Published by Indic Foundation. ISBN 979-8-9858830-2-2
- (2022) Nepal, a Shangri-La? Narratives of Culture, Contact, and Memory. Kathmandu: Mandala Books. ISBN 978-99933-42-58-8
- (2020) As the World Churns: A Legend Where Reality and Myth Blend. Indic Foundation: California, ISBN 9798667912378
- (2020) South Asian Studies: Bridging Cultures. SASA Books, San Bernardino, California. ISBN 9780578654300
- (2011) Nepal: Nostalgia and Modernity, Marg Foundation, Mumbai ISBN 9789380581088
- (2008) The Constant and Changing Faces of the Goddess: Goddess Traditions of Asia, Cambridge Scholars Publishing, Newcastle ISBN 9781847183903
- (1987) Himalayas at the Crossroads: Portrait of a Changing World, Pacific Asia Museum, Pasadena, California
- (1985) Popular Buddhist Mantras in Sanskrit, (co-authored with Shih Pei Lai), Mahayana Vihara Press, Taipei

==== Autobiography ====
- (2022) Nepal to California: A Life of Adventure and Memories. Los Angeles: Shangri-la Books. ISBN 979-8985883008

=== Book chapters ===
- (2025) “Rising from the Mountains: A Story of Resilience and Achievement” in The First in the Family: Narratives of First-Generation College Journeys edited by Courtney Brown, et al., Star Scholars Press, 2025, 8–12. ISBN 979-8-89524-032-8.
- (2022) "The Sound of Dhime: Identity of the Jyapu People" in Nepal: A Shangri-La? Narratives of Culture, Contact, and Memory. Kathmandu: Mandala Books. Edited by Deepak Shimkhada, et al. Kathmandu: Mandala Books
- (2020) The Cosmic Dance of Kali and the Black Hole coauthored with LaChelle Schilling, p. 178-197 in South Asian Studies: Bridging Cultures, Edited by Deepak Shimkhada, SASA Books.
- (2019) Uterus, p. 290-296 in She Rises: What Goddess Feminism, Activism, and Spirituality? Volume 3, Edited by Helen Hye-Sook Hwang, et al., Mago publishers.
- (2019) Finding our agency and awareness of Seeds of Life, co-authored with LaChelle Schilling, p. 351-359 in She Rises: What Goddess Feminism, Activism, and Spirituality? Volume 3, Edited by Helen Hye-Sook Hwang, et al., Mago publishers, 2019.
- (2018) Sacred Grove: The Playground of the Gods in Modern Hinduism in Text and Context edited by Lavanya Vemsani, Bloomsbury Academic Publishing. ISBN 978-1-350-04508-8
- (2013) Nepali Hindus in Southern California, in Contemporary Hinduism, P. Pratap Kumar (ed.), Durham: Acumen, ISBN 978-1844656905
- (2011) Kumari: Today and Tomorrow, in Nepal: Nostalgia and Modernity, Deepak Shimkhada (ed.), Marg Publishers, Mumbai, ISBN 978-93-80581-08-8
- (2010) Shamanic Healing: A Jhankri in the City in Health and Religious Rituals in South Asia, Fabrizio M. Ferrari (ed.), Routledge Publishers, UK ISBN 978-0415561457
- (2008) Goma: An Embodiment of the Goddess in The Constant and Changing Faces of the Goddess: Goddess Traditions of Asia, Deepak Shimkhada and Phyllis K. Herman (ed.), Cambridge Scholars Press, ISBN 978-1-84718-390-3
- (2005) Being in Love with God is not Enough: Social Reform by Basavanna Through Bhakti in Sangama: Confluence of Art and Architecture, Nalini Rao (ed.), Originals, Delhi ISBN 978-8188629480

=== Children's books ===
- (2022) Meeting Babaji. Shangri-La Books
- (2022) Hunt for a Relic. Shangri-La Books
- (2021) The Planet of the Dogs. Shangri-La Books
- (2021) The Lotus Chronicles Book Two: The Power of Two. Indic Books: Foundation for Indic Philosophy and Culture
- (2020) The Lotus Chronicles Book One: Jaya Confronts the Lord of Darkness. Indic Books: Foundation for Indic Philosophy and Culture. ISBN 9798571101851
- (2020) Surabhi The Wish-Fulfilling Cow: An Ancient Legend for Today. Indic Books: Foundation and Indic Philosophy and Culture
- (2014) Arjun Confronts Bullies at School. CreateSpace, ISBN 978-1499235234
- (2013) How Ganesha Outwitted His Brother to Circle the Universe. CreateSpace, ISBN 978-1493692859
- (2013) Thunder Rumbles in Preeti's House,. CreateSpace, ISBN 978-1490966670
- (2013) How Arjun and His Dad Outfox the Wolves. CreateSpace, ISBN 978-1484127612

== Journals ==
- (2023) “Death: Never Done Grieving”, in Journal of Dharma Studies 6(3):1-1, December 2023. DOI:10.1007/s42240-023-00156-7. License CC BY 4.0
- (2022) "Tushā Hiti: The Origin and Significance of the Name" in Monsoon: The Journal of South Asian Studies Association, Vol.1, No. 1, pp. 11–19.
- (2019) “Mata Tirtha: A Sacred Geography” in Journal of Dharma Studies, April, 2019.
- (2015) Deepak Shimkhada with Michael Reading, “Return to the womb: feminine creative imagery of arghya in a Tantric ritual” in International Journal of Dharma Studies (2015) 3:12.
- (2014) “The Date of the Chandi Murals in the Hanuman Dhoka Palace: Where History and Faith Meet”, AsianArt.com
- (2011) Deepak Shimkhada with Adam Pave,“Expressions of Love: Images from the 1648 Bhagavata Purana Manuscript”, Exemplar: The Journal of the South Asian Studies Association.
- (2008) “The Future of Nepal’s “Living” Goddess: Is Her Death Necessary?" Asian Art.
- (2007) "Oil Lamps as Expressions of Devotion," Marg (Mumbai, India), pp. 102–103
- (2005) "Book Review, Ethnic Revival and Religious Turmoil: Identities and Representations in the Himalayas”, in The Journal of Asian Studies, Vol.64, No.4, pp. 1059–1061, Marie Lecomte-Tilouine and Pascale Dollfus (ed.), New York: Oxford University Press, 2003
- (2000) "Erotic Body & Exotic Costumes," in Proceedings of the 32nd International Congress on Research in Dance, Claremont, California, pp. 30– 36
- (1990) "Wind Horses: Prayer Flags in the Himalayas," in Arts of Asia, (Hong Kong), Oct–Nov
- (1989) Deepak Shimkhada with Muriel Reeves, "Narayana: The Sleeping Vishnu" in Arts of Asia (Hong Kong), Vol. 19, No. 1 (Jan–Feb), pp. 152–155
- (1988) "Forms of Nepali Folk Dance" in Folk Dance Scene, November, Volume 23, Number 8, p. 12–14.
- (1986) "Interaction between Painting and Architecture in Nepali Art," in Himalayan Research Bulletin (New York: Cornell University), Vol. 6, No. 1, Winter, PP. 20–22
- (1984) "The Masquerading Sun: A Unique Image from Nepal", in Artibus Asiae (Switzerland), University of New York, Vol. 45, No. 4, pp. 223–230
- (1984) "Pratapamalla's Pilgrimage: An Historical Painting from Nepal," in Oriental Art (London), Vol. 30, No. 4, Winter pp. 368–70
- (1984) "Museum without Walls: Wayside Sculptures in the Kathmandu Valley," in Arts of Asia (Hong Kong), Vol. 14, No. 4, July–August, pp. 97–100
- (1983) "A Preliminary Study of the Game of Karma in India, Nepal, and Tibet," in Artibus Asiae (Switzerland: Institute of Fine Arts, New York), Vol. LXIV, No. 4, pp. 308–322
- (1983) "The Sunken Bath of Siddhinarasimha Malla in Patan," in Orientations, Vol. 14, No. 7, July, pp. 46–49
- (1982) "Measure of Karma: Origin and Iconography of Nagapasa in Nepali Painting," in Himalayan Research Bulletin, Cornell University: (Ithaca, New York) Vol. 11, No. 1, Winter, pp. 12–16
- (1973) "Nepali Paintings and the Rajput Style," in Arts of Asia, Vol. 4, No. 5, Sept–Oct, pp. 38–43
- (1973) "Appreciation of Nepali Folk Art" in Swatantra Vishwa (in Nepali), a publication of USIS (United States Information Service), Kathmandu, Nepal, p. 4–7
- (1973) "Mural Paintings in the Hanuman Dhoka Palace," in Abstracts of the Conference on Nepal at Claremont, Claremont Graduate School: Claremont, pp. 28–30
- (1970) "An Introduction to Nepalese Art", in NAFA Art Magazine (Kathmandu, Nepal), Vol. 1, No. 1, pp. 23–28

== Exhibition catalogs ==
- (2021) Virtual Exhibition of Contemporary Nepali Art by Deepak Shimkhada: SASA, California.
- (2014) Mother as Fertility, Mother as Goddess—The Female Torsos of Laya Mainali in The Sacred Feminine: Kathmandu, Nepal.
- (1992) The Tibetan Rug: The Nepalese Connection, in Woven Jewels: Tibetan Rugs from Southern California Collections Pacific Asia Museum: Pasadena, California.
- (1991) The Eye of India: Art of the people, an exhibition curated by Deepak Shimkhada at Palos Verdes Art Center's Beckstrand Gallery, Palos Verdes, California.
- (1982) God, Man, Woman, and Nature in Asian Art, Scripps College: Claremont, California.
- (1973) Exhibition of Nepali Art, Pomona College, Montgomery Art Gallery, Claremont, California.
- (1973) USC Collects: A Sampling of Taste, University of Southern California: Los Angeles.

== Filmography ==
Year	Title	Role	Notes	Ref(s)
2026	History Channel's The UnXplained	Himself	TV series (Impossible Ancient Structures. Season 8, Episode 1)	
2026	History Channel's Ancient Aliens: Wars of the Gods	Himself	TV series (Season 22, Episode 9)	
2026	History Channel's Ancient Aliens: Secrets of the Vedas	Himself	TV series (Season 22, Episode 8)	
2026	UnXplained with William Shatner	Himself	TV series (Impossible Ancient Structures. Season 8, Episode 1)	
2025	History Channel's The Top Ten Extraordinary Discoveries	Himself	TV series (Season 21, Episode 1)	
2024	The UnXplained - Impossible Ancient Inventions	Himself	TV series (Season 7, Episode 2)	
2023	History Channel's The Top Ten Mysteries of the Deep	Himself	TV series (Season 19, Episode 19)	
2023	History Channel's Edgar Cayce: The Sleeping Prophet	Himself	TV series (Season 19, Episode 15)	
2023	History Channel's The Top Ten Alien Craft	Himself	TV series (Season 19, Episode 14)	
2023	History Channel's The Top Ten Pyramid Sites	Himself	TV series (Season 19, Episode 11)	
2022	The UnXplained - What Lies Below?	Himself	TV series (Season 4, Episode 3)	
2021	The UnXplained - The Hunt for Hidden Treasures	Himself	TV series (Season 3, Episode 1)	
2021	History Channel's The Harmonic Code	Himself	TV series (Season 16, Episode 10)	
2021	History Channel's Impossible Artifacts	Himself	TV series (Season 16, Episode 7)	
2020	History Channel's The Lost Kingdom	Himself	TV series (Season 16, Episode 2)	
2020	History Channel's The Ultimate Guide to UFOs	Himself	TV series (Season 15, Episode 11)	
2020	History Channel's They Came from The Pleiades	Himself	TV series (Season 15, Episode 7)	
2019	History Channel's The Nuclear Agenda	Himself	TV series (Season 14, Episode 14)	
2019	History Channel's Secrets of the Maya	Himself	TV series (Season 14, Episode 6)	
2017	72 Dangerous Animals, Asia	Himself	Showrunner Productions, Australia. Distributor Netflix, US	
2017	History Channel's Voices of the Gods	Himself	TV series (Season 12, Episode 11)	
2017	History Channel's Akashic Records	Himself	TV series (Season 12, Episode 10)	
2017	History Channel's The Alien Frequency	Himself	TV series (Season 12, Episode 8)	
2016	Man at Arms, Weapons of the Gods	Himself	El Rey Channel, TV Series (Season 1, Episode 2)	
2016	Natural Histories	Himself	BBC London Radio interview Ganesha and elephants in South Asian art, culture and religion	
2016	History Channel's Shiva the Destroyer	Himself	TV series (Season 11, Episode 15)	
2016	History Channel's Decoding the Cosmic Egg	Himself	TV series (Season 11, Episode 6)	
2016	History Channel's The Visionaries	Himself	TV series (Season 11, Episode 5)	
2016	History Channel's Destination Mars	Himself	TV series (Season 11, Episode 2)	
2015	Natural Histories	Himself	BBC London Radio interview, snakes	
2015	History Channel's The Alien Wars	Himself	TV series (Season 10, Episode 9)	
2015	History Channel's The Alien Agenda	Himself	TV series (Season 9, Episode 12)	
2014	History Channel's The Great Flood	Himself	TV series (Season 9, Episode 8)	
2014	History Channel's Alien Resurrections	Himself	TV series (Season 9, Episode 6)	
2014	History Channel's Secrets of the Mummies	Himself	TV series (Season 9, Episode 5)	
2014	History Channel's The Genius Factor	Himself	TV series (Season 9, Episode 4)	
2014	History Channel's Forbidden Caves	Himself	TV series (Season 9, Episode 1)	
2014	History Channel's Aliens and Superheroes	Himself	TV series (Season 8, Episode 9)	
2014	History Channel's The God Particle	Himself	TV series (Season 8, Episode 7)	
2014	History Channel's The Reptilians	Himself	TV series (Season 8, Episode 5)	
2014	History Channel's Mysterious Devices	Himself	TV series (Season 8, Episode 3)	
2014	History Channel's Treasures of the Gods	Himself	TV series (Season 7, Episode 4)	
2014	History Channel's The Star Children	Himself	TV series (Season 7, Episode 3)	
2013	History Channel's Aliens and Mysterious Mountains	Himself	TV series (Season 6, Episode 11)	
2013	History Channel's Emperors, Kings and Pharaohs	Himself	TV series (Season 6, Episode 7)	
2013	History Channel's The Crystal Skulls	Himself	TV series (Season 6, Episode 2)	
2013	History Channel's "The Power of Three"	Himself	TV series (Season 6, Episode 1)	
2011	History Channel's Aliens and Deadly Cults	Himself	TV series (Season 3, Episode 12)	
2011	History Channel's Aliens and Deadly Weapons	Himself	TV series (Season 3, Episode 9)	
2011	History Channel's Aliens and Mysterious Rituals	Himself	TV series (Season 3, Episode 5)	
2009	Swaha: A Journey of Transformation	Himself	Documentary	

== Awards and honors ==
- 2016—CST (Claremont School of Theology) Fisher Adjunct Faculty Award for excellence in teaching
- 2008--CGU (Claremont Graduate University) Distinguished Alumni Service Award
- 1979--AIIS (American Institute of Indian Studies) Research Award
- 1972--Fulbright (U.S. Department of State)

== Personal life ==
Shimkhada married Kanti Shimkhada. They together have two daughters, Leepi Shimkhada and Riti Shimkhada.
