= Premman Chitrakar =

Nepalese artist and poet (1944–2020)

Prem Man Chitrakar
- प्रेम मान चित्रकार
- Born: 9 December 1944 (age 81); Siuchatar, Kathmandu, Nepal
- Died: 16 August 2020; National hospital, Kalanki, Kathmandu
- Occupations: Traditional paubha artist, poet, writer
- Spouse: Vidya Tuladhar
- Awards: Narottam Das Indira Shrestha Guthi Shrestha Puraskar; Indra Rajya Laxmi Pragya Puraskar

Prem Man Chitrakar (Nepali: प्रेममान चित्रकार; 1944–2020) was a veteran Nepalese Paubha artist, poet and writer. He has completed his Intermediate level of studies in Humanities. He has participated in several group shows and has own Newari publication including Prarampara Chojya Bidhi and Nepal Bhasaya Mecha Dapa Khala Jhigu Sa. He was former chairman of Nepal Paramparagat Kalakar Sangha, Founder Advisor of Artist's Society and also worked as a Sikka Designer in Nepal Rastra Bank.

== Biography ==
Chitrakar was born on 9 December 1944 at Bhimsensthan, in Newar community of the Kathmandu Valley in Nepal.

== Publication ==
- Prarampara Chojya Bidhi
- Nepal Bhasaya Mecha Dapa Khala Jhigu Sa

== Awards ==
- 2016 (2072 B.S.): Arniko National Fine Arts Academic Honor
- 1995 (2051 B.S.): Indra Rajyalaxmi Pragya Puraskar
- 2000 (2056 B.S.): Narottam Das Indira Shrestha Guthi Shrestha Puraskar
