= Milan Rai (artist) =

Nepalese artist

Milan Rai (born 1984) is a Nepalese contemporary visual artist, based in Kathmandu. Rai is most notable for his white butterfly project, which has been employed across the globe. The white butterflies have come to represent values such as hope, peace and harmony. Due to his work, he is often referred to as the "Butterfly Man". Rai has since averted his focus to increasing urban greenery in Kathmandu.

== Life and work ==
Rai has stated before that he was never really interested in conventional education. As a result, he dropped out of high school at the age of fourteen after having changed schools multiple times. Rai then requited to his childhood passion which is to paint. Shortly afterwards, he entered an art competition after seeing an advertisement poster in his local art shop, which to his surprise, Rai won. He then started exhibiting his artworks in art galleries. After initial commercial success, Rai questioned the integrity and motivation behind his work. This led Rai to abstaining from exhibitions in Nepalese art galleries. In order to make art more accessible to the general public in Kathmandu, Rai started placing white paper cut butterflies in public spaces in the city. Rai's white butterflies have been utilised in 40 different countries for various reasons. For this, he received the Harvard University (SAI) Visiting Artist Award (2016). Rai is now primarily focused on landscape architecture in the Kathmandu valley.

Rai is also known for his humanitarian work in Nepal. During the May 2015 Nepal earthquake, with the help of fifty volunteers, the Nepalese army and using funds from well-wishers, Rai and his team constructed 120 toilets in Kathmandu.
