= Indra Rajya Laxmi Pragya Puraskar =

Nepalese award

- Type: Order
- Awarded for: Contributing to Music, Dance and Art Areas.
- Country: Nepal
- Presented by: King of Nepal (Now President of Nepal)
- Established: 2016
- First award: 2016 BS
- Final award: 2060 BS

Indra Rajya Laxmi Pragya Puraskar (Nepali:इन्द्रराज्यलक्ष्मी प्रज्ञा–पुरस्कार) was an academic award given to persons contributing on the field of arts, music, dance and literature in Nepal. It was established in 2016 BS by King Mahendra. Initially this awards title was Indra Rajya Laxmi Puraskar. Award title was renamed to Indra Rajya Laxmi Pragya Puraskar in 2031 BS. This award was given by head of the state to the awardee. Until Nepal was republic, it was given by the King, and after the republic it is given by the president of Nepal. After the establishment of republic in Nepal in 2062BS, the award was stopped because it had the name of royals attached to it.
