= Lain Singh Bangdel =

Nepalese artist and writer

Lain Singh Bangdel (Rai)
- लैनसिंह बाङ्देल (राई)
- Born: 1919; Darjeeling, India
- Died: October 15, 2002 (age 83); Sanepa, Lalitpur, Nepal
- Known for: writer, novelist, art historian

Lain Singh Bangdel / Lain Bangdel (Rai) (Nepali: लैनसिंह बाङ्देल (राई)) (1919– October 15, 2002), was Nepal's foremost artist, novelist, and art historian. In addition to being a leading authority on Nepalese art, Bangdel is best known as the "father of modern art" and was responsible for introducing the modern trends of Western art into Nepal ("Bangdel era") with his pioneering one-man exhibition in Kathmandu in 1962.

As a novelist, he introduced realistic writing in Nepali literature during his period in Calcutta during the 1940s. Born in Darjeeling, India, he studied in Calcutta until 1951, lived in London and Paris until 1961, and finally came to his homeland Nepal in 1961. He also served as Life-Member, Vice-Chancellor, and finally Chancellor of the Royal Nepal Academy (1962–1991).

== Early life and career ==
Bangdel was born in 1919 in Darjeeling, India to a family from Khotang district of Eastern Nepal. His father was Rangalal Rai, and his mother's name was Bimala Rai. He spent his youth in a Himalayan village and, later, graduated with a degree in Fine Arts from the Government College of Arts and Crafts in Calcutta in 1945 with a first-class-first. He wrote popular novels in Nepali, namely Muluk Bahira, Maitaghar, and Langada ko Saathi (the first realistic literature in Nepali), during his stay in Calcutta.

In 1952, he traveled to Europe where he studied art in Paris at the Ecole des Beaux Arts. These formative years in Paris was critical time for him, where he met and developed close friendships with other international artists including the Indian artists Paritosh Sen, Padamsee, the Indonesian artist Affandi, and Austrian artist Soshana Afroyim. While in Paris in the 1950s, his meetings with Pablo Picasso and Georges Braque made a deep impression. Bangdel was the first Nepali artist to study and work in Paris and London, and made a name for himself as an artist with his distinctive, non-traditional Nepalese style.

== Work ==
Bangdel stayed in Europe until he was invited by the late King Mahendra to establish the modern art movement in Nepal in 1961. From 1968 to 1969, he served as a Fulbright Professor at Denison University in Ohio and taught Nepali History of Art. He was elected to head the Royal Nepal Academy in 1972 and, during two terms, he dedicated himself to further research of Nepalese painting and art history.

In the years from 1982 to 1991, he published his groundbreaking studies on Nepalese art history, including Early Sculptures of Nepal (1982). 2500 Years of Nepalese Art (German Edition, 1985 ), Stolen Images of Nepal (1989), Inventory of Stone Sculptures of the Kathmandu Valley (1991).

His many accolades include the "Commendatore" from the Italian Government for his contribution in the field of Arts and the "National Order of Arts and Letters" from the Republic of France (France's highest honor in the field of Arts). In addition, he was awarded Knight Commander of Royal Victorian Order by Great Britain. After his retirement from the Royal Nepal Academy, Bangdel engaged with renewed effort and success in his painting activities, and further documented the rich and unique art history of the Kathmandu Valley. Lain Singh Bangdel died in 2002.

His extraordinary life has been documented in a book entitled 'Against the Current: The Life of Lain Singh Bangdel-Writer, Painter and Art Historian of Nepal', by Don Messerschmidt and Dina Bangdel (Bangkok: Orchid Press, 2004; ISBN 974-524-052-4).His biography by Narendra Raj Prasai is also available in Nepali and English translation(The Glory of Nepal). His memoirs of his Paris years (1952–61) was published in 2010: "Muluk Bahira Ma (edited by Dina Bangdel, Kathmandu: Ratna Pustak Bhandar, 2010) and was awarded the "2010 Book of the Year."
