= Sushma Shakya =

Nepalese women visual artist (born 1975)

- Born: 1975 (age 50–51); Kathmandu, Nepal
- Occupation: Artist
- Known for: Artist in printmaking, book illustrations, video art, and installations

Sushma Shakya (born 1975) is a Nepalese woman visual artist who works on printmaking, painting, illustrations for books, video art, and installations. She has held many exhibitions of her art work across Nepal.

Shakya received the Australian Himalayan Foundation (AHF) Art Award during the International Women's Day 2015, which also involved a financial package as prize money. In 2013 she was the recipient of awards of the National Exhibition of Fine Arts in Sculpture and the Nepal Academy of Fine Arts in Woodcut.

== Biography ==
Shakya was born in Kathmandu, Nepal in 1975. Her interest in art work, though started at a young age, took shape while studying for a management program where she learned about fine arts. She then joined the Fine Arts College in Kathmandu where she received a degree of Bachelor of Fine Arts (Painting) and also a Diploma in Fine Arts. She studied at the University of Cambridge for "A Level art course (GCE Advanced Supplementary Art and Design)". She also holds a master's degree in Business Administration from the Tribhuvan University, Kathmandu. From 2009 to 2010, she did a one-year program with support from the Australian Himalayan Art Foundation.

Initially, from 2000 to 2003, she worked as an Art Teacher at Rato Bangala School, Patan Dhoka, then worked on illustrations for children's books, and since 2007 she is working as a lecturer in the School of Art, Centre for Art and Design at Mandikhatar in the Kathmandu University.

Shakya's art work presents the prevalent situation of the ecosystem, particularly in the context of the degraded conditions of vegetation and animals caused by human interference. Her paintings bring out the methods for "the coexistence of creatures and humans on this planet".

Her art works have been exhibited in several group exhibitions held since 2004. She held solo exhibitions under the titled "Fragmented Memories" in 2007 and "Chaitya" at the Siddhartha Art Gallery in 2010 in Kathmandu. She has attended many art workshops since 2001.
