= Pramila Giri (artist) =

Nepalese-Norwegian artist

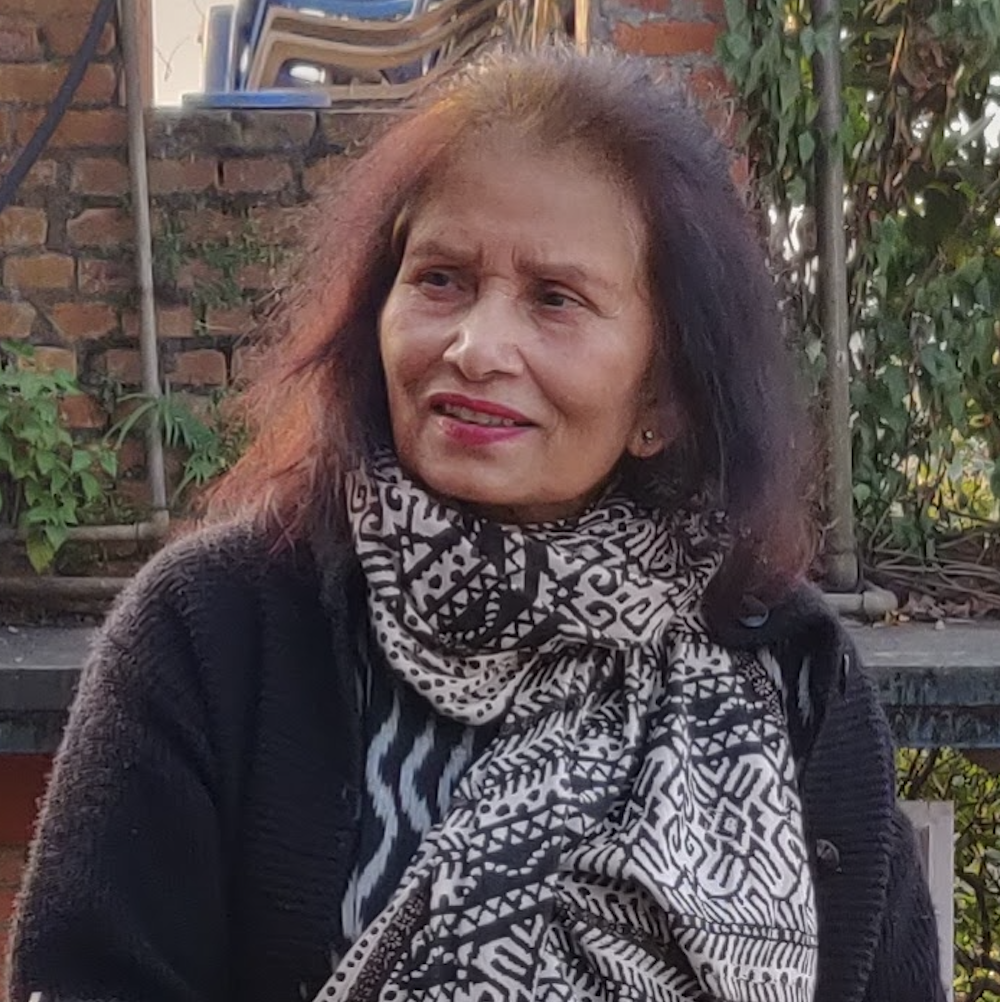
Pramila Giri in Kathmandu, 2019

Pramila Giri (born 1946 (age 79–80), in Bastipur village at Sagarmatha Zone, Nepal) is a visual artist who has been living and practising in Norway since 1997. She practises in the mediums of sculpture and painting. During the initial years of her practice in the 1980s, Giri experimented with marble and resin, mediums that had not as yet been used in Nepal in the arts. Presently her work synthesises large-scale abstract sculptures with paintings that create an environment, and have a monumental effect on onlookers. Her sculptures are installed in significant sites in Nepal and abroad. In 1978, she was among a group of artists who represented Nepal in the Fourth Triennale - India. In 2019, she participated in "Nepal Art Now," a large-scale exhibition at Weltmuseum Wien, "the most extensive exhibition of modern and contemporary art from Nepal to date" according to the museum's press release.

== Education and teaching ==
Giri completed her intermediate level of college at Illahabad India, and then pursued painting at Tagore Kala Bhawan (Art Campus), Shantiniketan, West Bengal, India. At Tagore Kala Bhawan, she had teachers who were invested in the project of building more expansive contextual modernism in art, as part of their struggle for freedom against colonial yoke. The artist was influenced by the institution's emphasis on close relationships with nature and the craft of local communities.

In 1974, Giri received a grant from Asian Cultural Council to study sculpture in the US. The artist completed an MA with a major in Art from California State University, Long Beach, in 1975 and an MFA from California State University in 1976 through a Rockefeller III scholarship. Through her experience in the US, she gained exposure to international art forms and trends, as well as the importance of art education. She is the first sculptor to gain a Master's degree in sculpture in Nepal.

After her MFA, Giri returned to Kathmandu and was one of the foundational teachers at the Campus of Fine Arts, Tribhuvan University. Along with other artists like Manuj Babu Mishra and Shashi Bikram Shah, she facilitated the creation of a four-year course. She taught there for 18 years, and was involved in discussions on innovating traditional art forms in contemporary practice, particularly from Nepal.

== Artistic research ==
In the 1980s, Giri did research on Lord Bhairav, a god from the Hindu pantheon that is a reincarnation of Lord Shiva, and who Giri felt is understudied. Her emphasis was on the circular aspects of the deity in his relationship to creation, destruction and creation again. Her interest revealed her interest in the religious and philosophic contents of the aesthetic symbolism in which Bhairav is variously portrayed. Her first Bhairav series was exhibited in the Sridharani Gallery, New Delhi in 1988. Her exhibitions at Henie Onstad Art Centre, Høvikodden in Norway and at Art Heritage in Delhi in 1992 were further articulations of her engagement.

While Giri travelled extensively and had personal ties outside of Nepal, the cultures of Himalayas impacted her visual vocabulary, including Tibet and particularly the icons, symbols and motifs that characterise the region. Her visits to Tibet began in 1990, and she was drawn to the murals, thangka (paintings of Buddhist religious motifs) and architecture. Her connection remained as she visited the region frequently and even lectured at Tibet University in 2004.

In the late 1990s, the artist began to divide time between Nepal and Norway and was drawn to thinking about nature and light in the context. Her location in Norway further influenced her sensibility in abstraction.

== Exhibitions ==
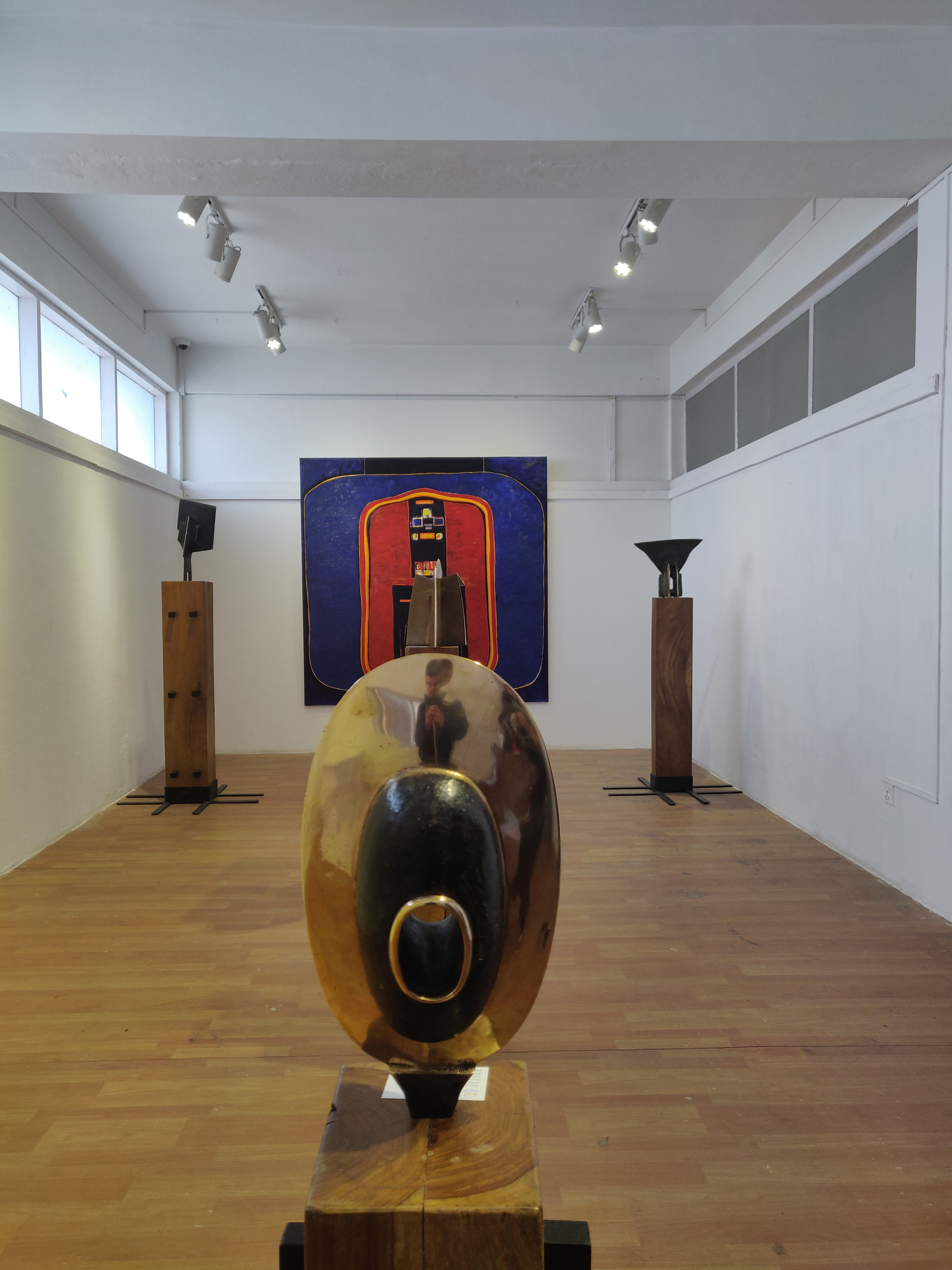
Installation view of Pramila Giri's works at the Nepal Art Council in 2018, as a precursor to the "Nepal Art Now" exhibit at the Weltmuseum Wien.

Giri's solo exhibitions include: 'Search for Human Values', Nepal Art Council, Kathmandu (2016); 'Images of Life' at DORA, Trondheim, Norway (2014); Galleri-sg, Trondheim (2012); Sula fyr, Frøya commune (2010); Galleri - sg., Trondheim (2009); Gjørtlerne fra Tronfheim of Kathmandu (2008); Bronsestøping av Kaare Ramberg of Madan Prajapati (2008); En utstilling med skulptured av billedhoggenen (2008); Pramila Giri med støtte av Sør - Trøndelag Fylkes (2008); Kulturstipend for 2006 (2008); Trondheim Folkebibliotek (2008); Gallery RICA with Galleri-sg, T.heim (2006); Galleri-sg. Scarffscher, T.heim, Norway (2004); Patan Museum, Nepal (2002); "Tibet Series," Nidaros Cathedral, T.heim, Norway (2001); "Mitt Univers," Trondhjem Art Society, Norway (2001); "Sound of Silence," Ludmilla Bazynska Gallery, New York, NY (1997); City Hall, Kathmandu, Nepal (1994); Triveni Kala Sangam, New Delhi (1994); Art Heritage Gallery, Triveni Kala Sangam, New Delhi, India (1992); "Mysticism," Henie-Onstad Art Centre, Høvikodden, Norway (1992); Sridharani Gallery, Triveni Kala Sangam, (Art centre), New Delhi, India (1988); City Hall, Kathmandu, Nepal (1982); US Information Centre, Kathmandu, Nepal (1976); and California State University, US (1976).

Recent group shows include the exhibition organized at the Tibet University, Lhasa (2004) and "Where Birds are Flying /Der fuglar fly," Det norske teatret / The Norwegian Theater (with Brigitte Grimstad, Elisabeth Medbøe, Wenche Medbøe, Mette Nissen Melsom) (2000).

== Public art projects ==
Giri has received several commissions for public art projects, starting in the late 1970s. These include: "Shakti", National Electricity Authority (NEA), Ratna Park, Kathmandu, Nepal (1998); "Protector", Royal Nepalese Embassy, Tansen Marg, New Delhi (1997); "Prakriti-Purush", Embassy of Japan, Lazimpath, Kathmandu, Nepal (1994); "Source of Energy", Nepal Industrial Development Corporation (NIDC) (1993); "Liberation", at the studio of the artist, Bisalnagar, Kathmandu (1987-1990); "Saraswati", National Primary Education Centre, Thimi, and Kathmandu (1986); "Third Eye", National Life Insurance Building, Kathmandu (1985); and "Coronation", Tribhuvan University, Kathmandu (1978), among others.

== Collections ==
Work by Giri is in the collection of the Fukuoka Asian Art Museum.
