= Manjul Baraili =

Sculptor from Nepal

Manjul Baraili (born 1980) is an artist and sculptor from Nepal. He has carved more than 2000 statues which includes the statue of Bindabasini at Kathmandu, statue of Phalgunanda in Terahatum, and Bhanubhakata in Jhapa. He has also carved buddha statue in Kuwamoto, Japan. He has received National Youth Talent Award by Nepal Government in 2072BS.

== Biography ==
Baraili was born on 11 February 1980 in Mikaljong village of Morang District in Nepal to father Indra Bahadur Biswakarma and mother Sarita Biswakarma. While he was in junior school, he was inspired by Araniko after reading the biography and started sculpturing stones. Later, he renamed himself as Majul Miteri.

Manjul is also a poet, singer and musician and has released a solo album.

== Awards ==
- National Youth Talent Award 2072 by Nepal Government.

== Others ==
- In 2065 BS, he announced to donate 1000 statues to the county. He has carved more than 150 statues depicting various philosophers, politicians and scientists for this project.
- He has opened a small museum in his hometown named Manjul Museum.

== See also ==
- Sushma Shimkhada
- Thakur Prasad Mainali
