= Juddhodaya Public High School =

Juddhodaya Public High School Nepali: जुद्धोदय पब्लिक हाइ स्कूल

Information
- Established: 1938; 87 years ago

Juddhodaya Public High School (or JP High School) (Nepali: जुद्धोदय पब्लिक हाइ स्कूल) is a school in Kathmandu, Nepal. Founded by Tirtha Raj Singh Suwal, JP High School is the second oldest school in Nepal.

== History ==
The school was founded in 1938.
