= Raj Man Singh Chitrakar =

Nepalese artist (1797 – 1865)

- राज मान सिंह चित्रकार
- Born: 1797; Kathmandu, Kingdom of Nepal
- Died: 1865 (aged 67–68); Kathmandu, Kingdom of Nepal
- Occupation: Painter

Raj Man Singh Chitrakar (Nepali: राजमानसिंह चित्रकार; IAST: rāja māna siṃha citrakāra) (1797 – 1865) was a mid-19th century Nepalese artist, who worked for the British and Nepalese courts producing a large number of pictures. He especially contributed to the illustration of natural history subjects, particularly birds, and in his watercolor painting he introduced European styles into a traditional scene dominated by votive art.

Raj Man Singh was the first to apply the Western concepts of lighting and perspective, and is credited for the appearance of three-dimensional effects in Nepalese painting. Scholars have described him as a pioneer in Nepalese art, although largely unknown until Brian Houghton Hodgson's tutelage.

== Art and background ==
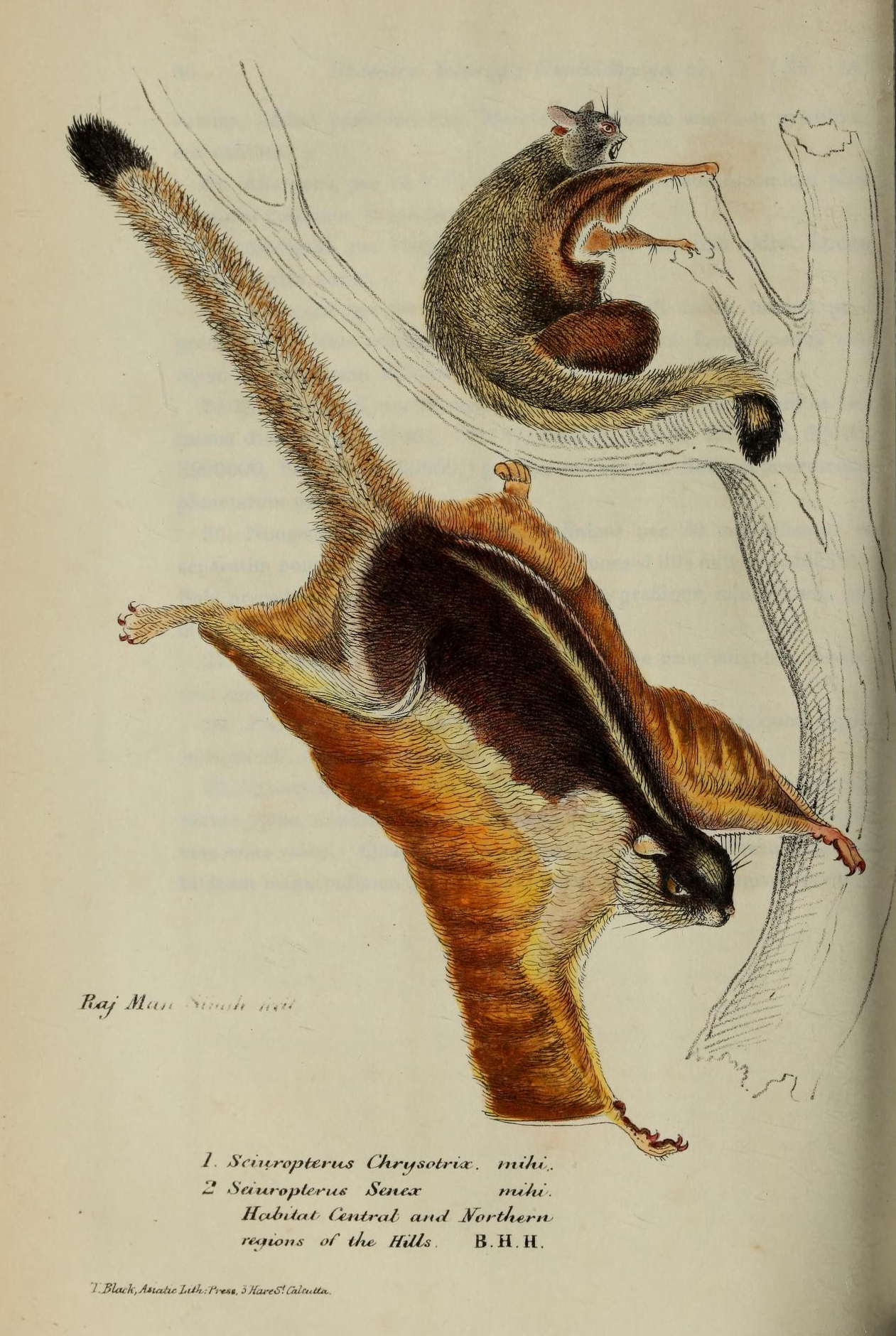
An illustration of the Bhutan giant flying squirrel for the Journal of the Asiatic Society of Bengal (1843) with credits to the artist

Raj Man Singh was born in Kathmandu to a family of hereditary artists, the Newar caste of Chitrakar. Accordingly, he engaged in painting paubha paintings and other religious art. He came to the attention of Brian Houghton Hodgson, the British Resident stationed in Kathmandu who was also a scholar of the religions, languages, literature, ethnology and zoology of the Himalaya. Hodgson was looking for an artist to the make watercolor paintings of the birds and mammals he was studying for his collection, and he hired Raj Man Singh to do them.

Under Hodgson's guidance, the traditional artist, used to painting pictures of deities as per ancient texts, mastered the new technique of observing subjects in their natural habitat and making lifelike representations on paper. He produced thousands of works of remarkable quality for Hodgson from the 1820s to the 1850s.

== Honors ==
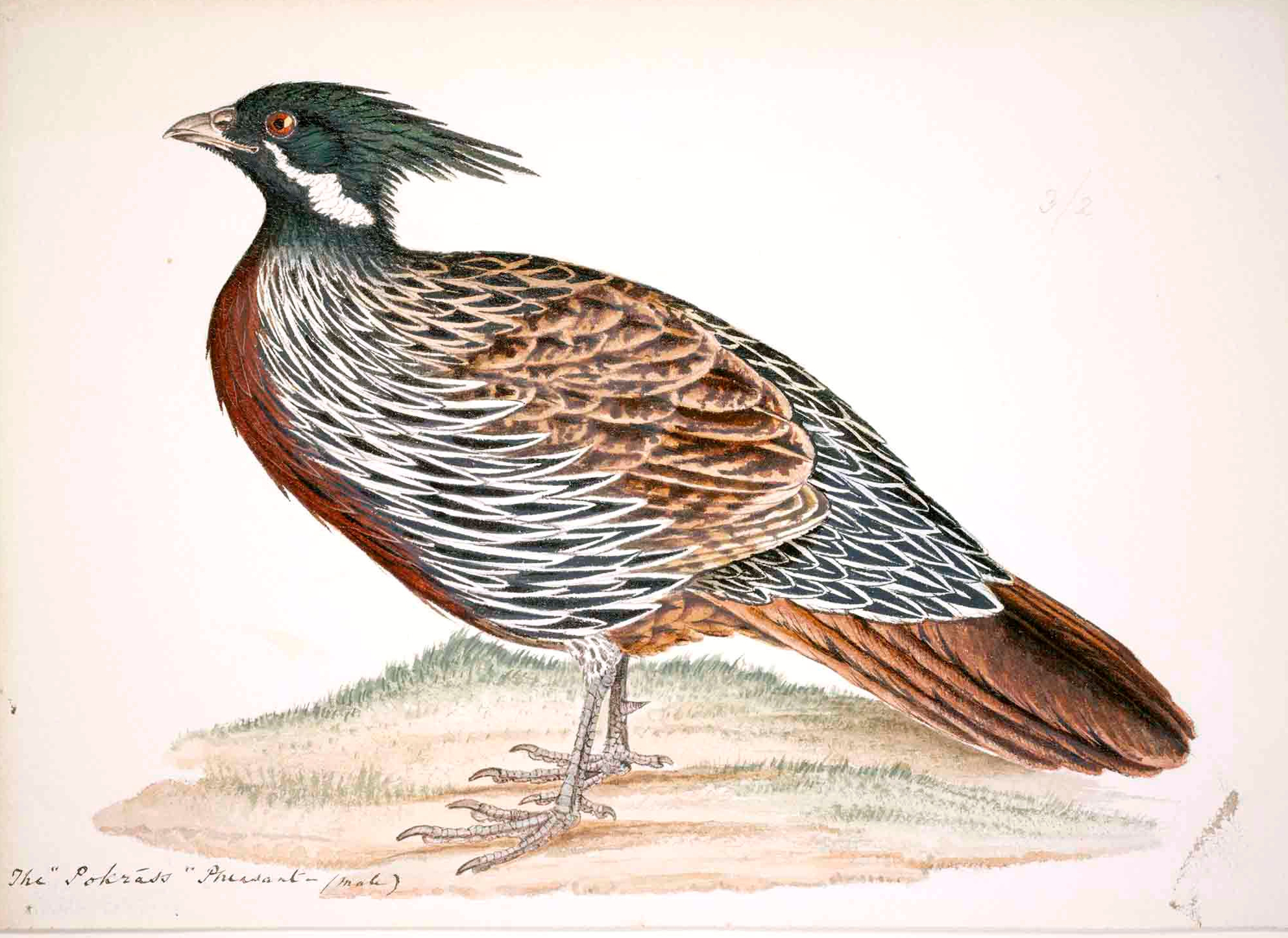
Koklass pheasant by Raj Man Singh

The little-known Raj Man Singh has recently been recognized as a leading figure following revelations of his ground-breaking work. On 31 December 2012, the Postal Services Department of the government of Nepal issued two commemorative postage stamps showing a portrait of the artist to honor his contribution to the development of 19th century art in Nepal. The stamps also show examples of his watercolor paintings of birds and mammals.

== See also ==
- Nepalese painting
- Newar people
