= Sushma Shimkhada =

Nepali sculptor (1936–2018)

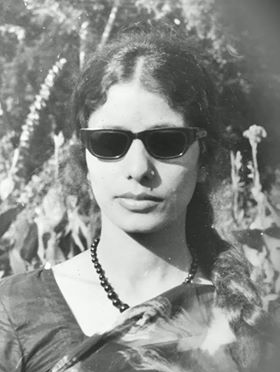
- Born: January 1, 1936; Darkha, Nepal
- Died: February 5, 2018 (aged 82); Kathmandu, Nepal
- Education: Maharaja Sayajirao University of Baroda
- Occupation: Sculptor
- Years active: Early 1970s–mid 1980s

Sushma Shimkhada (1939–2018) was a Nepali sculptor, who received the Mahakavi Devakota Award in fine arts from the government of Nepal in 2015.

== Early life and education ==
Born in 1936 in Darkha, a remote village 80 miles northwest of Kathmandu, Shimkhada is the seventh child of Kausalya Devi and Ratna Prasad Shimkhada. She grew up in Darkha and moved to Kathmandu with her parents in 1958.

Shimkhada initially went to Baroda to study photography but finally studied sculpture under several sculptors at the Faculty of Fine Arts, including the notable Sankho Chaudhuri. Shimkhada earned a certificate in photography in 1969 and a certificate in sculpture in 1971 from the M.S. University of Baroda. Then Shimkhada returned to Kathmandu in 1971 to practice and teach art to children at Bal Mandir and the Lalitkala campus for a short time.

== Art exhibitions ==
As a member of the Nepal Association of Fine Arts, Shimkhada spent her time sculpting and regularly exhibiting her work at annual art exhibitions and group shows. She is believed to be the first female sculptor of Nepal.

- 1978 Exhibited at the 4th Triennale-India in New Delhi, India

== Awards and recognition ==
- 2015 Mahakavi Devakota Award in fine arts given by the government of Nepal
- 1976 First prize at the art exhibition organized by Nepal Association of Fine Arts (NAFA) on the occasion of International Women's Day

== See also ==
- Manjul Baraili
- Thakur Prasad Mainali
