= Thakur Prasad Mainali =

Nepali artist

- Born: 1934 (age 91–92); Walting, Kavre, Nepal
- Education: Maharaja Sayajirao University of Baroda
- Known for: Contemporary arts and sculpture

Thakur Prasad Mainali is a Nepalese artist and sculptor, known as a pioneer of Nepali modern art. He previously served as the chief of arts and craft department of the Royal Nepal Academy and served as Vice-Chancellor of Nepal Academy of Fine Arts. He is married to Indira Mainali and has five children, Lata Kaini, Laya Mainali, Meena Upreti, Rachana Rimal and Reecha Rijal.

== Education and early career ==
Born in 1934 to Ram Prasad Mainali and Indra Maya Mainali at Walting, Kavre, Thakur Prasad Mainali went to India to study sculpture. He studied sculpture under Sankho Chaudhuri, a noted Indian artist, at the Maharaja Sayajirao University of Baroda. After graduating in Fine Arts, he returned to Kathmandu in 1963 and helped found Nepal Association of Fine Arts (NAFA) in 1965 with Crown Prince Birendra Bir Bikram Shah as its Chairman. He served as NAFA’s secretary from 1965 to 1967 and again from 1970 to 1977. In 2010 when Nepal became a new republic, Nepal Association of Fine Arts became Nepal Academy of Fine Arts. Under new management, Mainali served as Vice-Chancellor of the newly formed organization from 2010 to 2014.

== Career as a sculptor ==
Mainali is known for his contemporary style in arts and sculpture. Nepalese sculptor Bhuwan Thapa has named him as "the Father of the modern sculpture of Nepal". The valley of Kathmandu is dotted with sculptures of many kinds—religious and secular. There are statues of gods and Nepal’s past kings scattered in the cities of Kathmandu, Patan, and Bhaktapur; however, no work of a monumental scale with a contemporary theme was found in a public space before Mainali. He is the first individual from Nepal to go to a university in India to earn a degree in sculpture, and then return to his country to engage his whole life producing sculptures using modern techniques and themes.

In 1965, Mainali was appointed to make a sculpture in Bhrikuti Mandap, a public park—the first contemporary piece of its kind on a monumental scale. It’s a 35-foot-tall artistic monument made of cement and concrete. After his initial monumental work at Bhrikuti Mandap, he went on to make other large-scale public pieces. In between his monumental works he also made many bronze pieces of a smaller scale, which have been acquired by collectors around the world.

As a sculptor, he has exhibited his works at various art shows in Nepal and abroad. Mainali has been honored by various art organizations and the government of Nepal for his service to art community and cited by art historians, art critics, and his fellow artists as a pioneer of Nepali modern art.

== Works ==
Mainali writes poetry apart from sculpting and has been published in several books and journals. An anthology of his poems has been published in Nepali as well as in English under the name of Flames of Devotion.

Books

- Contemporary Art and Artists of Nepal, 1975
- NAFA Art Magazine, 1970
- Art Since The Time of Arniko
- Flames of Devotion, 2014
- In the Development of Nepali Sculpture - Thakur Prasad Mainali, 2021
- Discussion of Art - Thakur Prasad Mainali, 2023
- My Desire - Thakur Prasad Mainali, 2023
- Creation & Analysis - Thakur Prasad Mainali, 2023

Books where Mainali's work has been published or discussed;

- Weisbrot, Bhikshuni; Holnes, Darrel Alejandro; Lara, Elizabeth, eds. (2017). Happiness, The Delight-Tree: An Anthology of Contemporary International Poetry (1st ed.). United Nations SRC Society of Writers. p. 46. ISBN 9781938599729.
- Katherine Harper (2011). "Re-Imagining the Universe Neo-Trantra in Nepal". In Shimkhada, Deepak (ed.). Nepal: Nostalgia and Modernity. Marg Foundation. p. 72. ISBN 9789380581088.
- Mainali, Laya (2003). Thakur Prasad Mainali and his Modern Environmental Sculpture.
- Nepal’s Who’s Who, 2007, pg.165.

Magazines

- Shrestha, Agam (2015). "Fine Art". Lalit Kala Patrika: 38–39.
- Space (Art- Architecture-Design) monthly magazine in which Sampada Malla discusses Mainali’s Chanting Divine Prayers- Sculptures, 2008, p. 58-62.
- DeFolo, Keith (1978). "Thakur Prasad Mainali and his art". Free World Magazine (Swatantra Biswa): 28–31.
- Enn, Murian (1976). "Works of Nepali artist Thakur Prasad Mainali". Creation (TUBORCHICTOVA) Art Journal- Artist Union of USSR: 20–21.
- Tulaya, C. (1971). "Nepalese, Nepal and its Art". ECKUCTOVA, Art Journal, Union of Artist Russia-USSR and Academy of Arts USSR: 52–53.

== Awards and recognition ==
- 2022: Lifetime Sculpture Achievement Award, Commercial Artists Association of Nepal
- 2003: Vikhytat Tri Shakti Patta, given by His Majesty’s Government of Nepal
- 2001: Birendra Aishwarya Sewa Padak, given by His Majesty’s Government of Nepal
- 1996: Silver Medal on the occasion of King Birendra’s Accession to the throne
- 1995: Prabal Gorkha Dakshin Bahu
- 1974: King Birendra’s Coronation Medal
- 1974: King Birendra National Art Gold Medal
- 1977-79: Royal Nepal Academy Fellow

== See also ==
- Sushma Shimkhada
- Manjul Baraili
