= Ashmina Ranjit =

Nepalese artist and activist (born 1966)

- Born: 1966 (age 59–60)
- Occupations: Artist; Activist
- Movement: Feminist activism
- Website: ashmina.wordpress.com

Ashmina Ranjit (born 1966) is a Nepalese artist and activist. She holds an MFA from Columbia University and has created performance and conceptual art addressing gender roles, human rights, and sociopolitical issues in Nepal. Her work has included themes identified in Nepalese media and scholarship as culturally sensitive, such as menstrual discrimination and class inequality. Ranjit has been noted in art historical accounts for her contributions to contemporary Nepalese conceptual and performance art, particularly during the Nepalese Civil War and the country’s political transition to democracy.

== Artistic practice ==
Scholars and commentators have described Ranjit’s artistic practice as informed by feminist ideology and activism. Her work addresses themes such as female identity, gender roles, sexuality, and the social constraints imposed on women. She has used materials associated with the human body – such as hair, blood, and clothing – which she has stated are intended to reflect women’s experiences and comment on prevailing social norms.

Ranjit's work has also incorporated broader sociopolitical topics, including war, violence, and human rights violations. One of her projects, A Happening: Nepal’s Present Situation (2004), involved a public performance using sound and collective participation to reflect on the effects of the Nepalese Civil War.

== Notable achievements ==
Ranjit was a recipient of a Fulbright Senior Scholar/Artist Fellowship. In 2004, she performed A Happening: Nepal’s Present Situation with 100 volunteers. In 2018, Ranjit initiated the collective Asian art project 52 Artists 52 Actions. In 2022, her installation Womb Room was exhibited at the Kathmandu Triennale 2077.

Her work is part of the Fukuoka Asian Art Museum's collection.

In 2018, the Nepalese publisher Vajra Books released Silence No Longer: Artivism of Ashmina, a book on Ranjit’s work and activism.
