= Darkha =

Darkha दार्खा
- Village development committee
- Location in Nepal
- Coordinates: 28.07°N 85.01°E
- Country: Nepal
- Zone: Bagmati Zone
- District: Dhading District

Population (1991)
  - Total: 4,979
  - Religions: Buddhist
- Time zone: UTC+5:45 (Nepal Time)

Darkha is a village development committee in Dhading District in the Bagmati Zone of central Nepal. At the time of the 1991 Nepal census it had a population of 4979 and had 910 houses in it.
