= Sankho Chaudhuri =

Indian artist (1916 – 2006)

Sankho Chaudhuri (25 February 1916 – 28 August 2006) was an Indian sculptor artist, and a noted figure in the art scene of India. (Although named Naranarain in due family tradition, he was more widely known by his pet name Sankho). Ram Kinker Baij was his teacher. He began close to cubism and then was influenced by István Beöthy, whom he had met in Paris. His themes have included the female figure and wildlife. He has worked in a wide range of media and produced large-scale reliefs and mobiles. He was a recipient of Padma Shri in 1971; a National Award and Fellow of the Lalit Kala Akademi, New Delhi, 1956 & 1982; D.Litt. (Honoris Causa) by the Centro Escolar University, Philippines, 1974; Aban-Gohan Award by Visva Bharati University, 1981. He was the Ist Honorary Joint Secretary, Indian Sculptors Association, Mumbai. He was Chairman of Lalit Kala Akademi, New Delhi in the late 1980s. A Retrospective was held of his works at the NGMA in 1997.

== Education ==
Chaudhuri completed his Bachelor of Arts and Diploma in Fine Arts from Kala Bhavan, Santiniketan in 1939. In 1945, he earned a Diploma in Fine Art with Distinction in Sculpture, from Kala Bhavan, Santiniketan.

== Career ==
He taught Fine Arts at the University of Dar-e-Salam Tanzania and also represented the country at the International Conferences in UNESCO, Paris and Venice.

== Nominations and appointments ==
- 1949-57: Reader & Head, Dept. of Sculpture, MS University of Baroda.
- 1952: First Hony. Joint Secretary – Indian Sculptors Association, Bombay.
- 1956: Member, Lalit Kala Akademi.
- 1957-70: Professor & Head, Dept. of Sculpture, MS University of Baroda.
- 1966-68: Dean, Faculty of Fine Arts, M.S. University, Baroda.
- 1974: Honorary Secretary, Lalit Kala Akademi.
- 1976: Visiting Professor, B.H.U.
- 1977-78: Visiting Fellow, Visva-Bharati University, Santiniketan.
- 1980: Professor of Fine Arts, University of Dar es Salaam, Tanzania.
- 1984-89:
- * Full-time Member, Delhi Urban Art Commission.
- * Member, All India Handicrafts Board,
- * Member International Jury,- 5th Triennale-India,
- * Chairman, Lalit Kala Akademi.

== Major awards ==
- 1956: National Award by Lalit Kala Akademi.
- 1971: Padmashri by President of India.
- 1974: D.Litt. (Honoris Causa) by the Centre Escolar University, Philippines.
- 1979: Aban-Gagan Award from Visva-Bharati University.
- 1982: Fellow, Lalit Kala Akademi.
- 1997: Honorary Doctorate from Rabindra Bharati University.
- 1998: Desikottama (Honorary Doctorate) by Viswa Bharati University.
- 2000-02: Kali Das Samman.
- 2002: Aditya Birla Kala Shikhar Puraskar.
- 2004: "Lalit Kala Ratna" Honoured by Lalit Kala Akademi.
- 2004: "Lifetime Achievement Award" Legend of India.

== Participation and organisations ==
- 1961: Represented India at International Symposium of Sculptors in 1962 Yugoslavia.
- 1963: Organised Lalit Kala Akademi's Sculptors Camp at Makrana.
- 1964: Lecture tour to Poland; Toured to Russia as a guest of the Artists Union.
- 1969: Organised "Folk and Tribal Images of India" exhibited for Lalit Kala Akademi.
- 1972: Organised Rural India Complex, on behalf of All India Handicrafts Board.
- 1974: Participated in the 1st Biennale of Arab Artists.
- 1976: Participated in Seminar on Tagore, Darlington, England.
- 1976-77: Organised Artists' Studios at Garhi for Lalit Kala Akademi.
- 1982: Participated in Seminar organized by the British Museum, Organised an exhibition of Books at Festival of India.
- 1983: Invited to Baghdad in International Art Festival- served as a member of jury.
- 1985: Represented India at UNESCO, Paris Conference on preservation - of Folk Lore Tradition.
- 1985: Visited Bucharest – Village Museum.
- 1982: Represented India at the International Conference, sponsored by UNESCO, Venice.
- 1986: Visited Ethnographic Museum at Oslo, Lillehammer and open – Air Museum at Copenhagen, Denmark.
- 1988: Visited Japan, as visiting Fellow and toured to Indonesia.
- 1989: Led a delegation to China at the invitation of the Chinese Peoples – Society for Friendship with Foreign Country.

== Major exhibitions ==
- 1946: 1st One-man show, Bombay.
- 1954: Exhibition of Contemporary Sculpture, National Gallery of Modern Art.
- 1957: One-man show in New Delhi.
- 1969: One-man show in Bombay.
- 1971: Retrospective show: National Gallery of Modern Art.
- 1979: Joint Exhibition with Ira Chaudhuri, Bombay.
- 1987: One-man show, New Delhi
- 1987: One-man show, of Sketches and drawing, Calcutta.
- 1991: One-man show, Calcutta.
- 1992: One-man show at LTG Gallery, New Delhi.
- 1995: One –man show, Cymroza Art Gallery, Bombay.
- 2004: One-man show at Baroda, Organised by Sarjan Art Gallery.
