= Shashi Bikram Shah =

Nepali artist (born 1940)

- शशी बिक्रम शाह
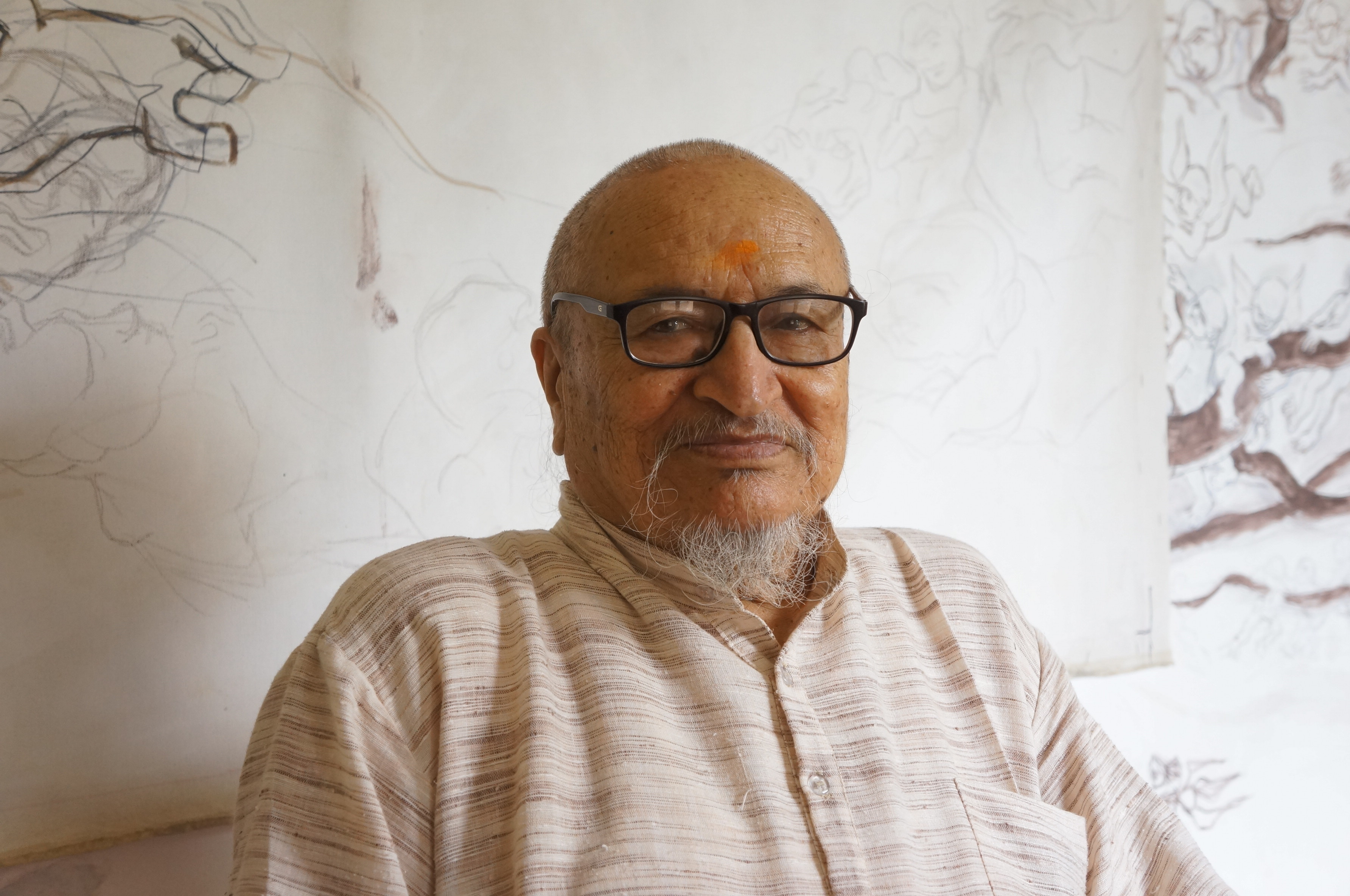
- Shah in his studio, 2017
- Born: 31 March 1940 (age 86); Bhote Bahal, Kathmandu
- Education: Sir J.J. School of Art, Mumbai
- Known for: painting, drawing
- Notable work: Ten Incarnations, Kalki Avatar, Samudramanthan, Royal Massacre Series

Shashi Bikram Shah (also: Shashi Shah, Nepali: शशी बिक्रम शाह) is a Nepali artist born in Kathmandu in 1940, and with a career spanning five decades, is regarded as one of the preeminent contemporary artists of Nepal and one of the country's first modernist painters.

Shah’s lifelong fascination with art matured in the 1960s while studying at the Sir J.J. School of Art in Mumbai, where he got introduced to works of impressionists and surrealists. The influence of these artists are still evident in Shah’s paintings which continuously aim to capture the world’s suffering. His works have garnered numerous accolades, have been exhibited in over ten countries, and have been featured in many public and private collections.

Shah's works are often based on myths from Hindu puranas. He is renowned for his depiction of horses, which in his work is often a metaphor for the Kalki avatar of Vishnu, who in Hindu iconography is depicted riding a horse. Kalki is a salvation figure prophesied to appear at the end of the Kali Yuga for the deliverance of human beings from suffering and adharma. In effect, Shah uses this metaphor to represent the duality of and the dialectics between suffering and salvation. Many of Shah's work draw from the Dashavatar, the ten primary incarnations of Vishnu.

While rooting his paintings in traditional Hindu motifs, Shah also represents contemporary issues such as war, terrorism, and inequality. In addition to paintings, Shah is also known for his draftsmanship and sculptures.

Shah was an active member of SKIB'71, the first modernist art collective in Nepal. In addition to Shashi Shah, the group consisted of Krishna Manandhar, Indra Pradhan, and Batsa Gopal Vaidya. He was also a founder member and principal of the Sirjana College of Fine Arts in Kathmandu.
